= List of United Artists films =

United Artists (UA) is an American film and television entertainment studio founded in 1919 by D. W. Griffith, Charlie Chaplin, Mary Pickford, and Douglas Fairbanks. This is a list of feature films originally produced or distributed by United Artists, including those made overseas. Short subjects distributed by the studio, such as cartoons by Walt Disney Productions and Walter Lantz Productions are not included.

This list also includes films that received the United Artists copyright.

== 1919–1920s ==
=== 1919 ===
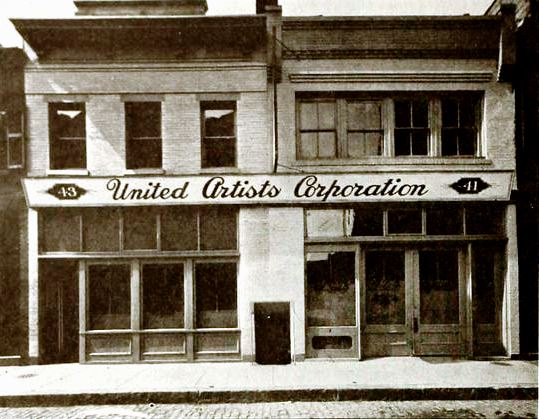
Offices of United Artists in Boston (1919)

Release date	Title	Notes
May 13, 1919	Broken Blossoms (Note: Owned by Cohen Media Group; sales rights represented by HanWay Films)	originally made for Famous Players–Lasky; bought by United Artists; Inducted into the National Film Registry in 1996
September 1, 1919	His Majesty, the American	first United Artists-distributed production
December 28, 1919	When the Clouds Roll By	

=== 1920 ===
Release date	Title	Notes
January 18, 1920	Pollyanna	
January 27, 1920	Suds	
April 25, 1920	Down on the Farm	
May 16, 1920	Romance	film is considered lost
June 13, 1920	The Mollycoddle	
August 22, 1920	The Love Flower	
September 3, 1920	Way Down East	
December 5, 1920	The Mark of Zorro	Inducted into the National Film Registry in 2015

=== 1921 ===
Release date	Title	Notes
January 9, 1921	The Love Light	
March 6, 1921	The Nut	
April 12, 1921	Dream Street	
May 5, 1921	Through the Back Door	
August 21, 1921	Disraeli	
August 28, 1921	The Three Musketeers	
September 15, 1921	Little Lord Fauntleroy	
October 9, 1921	J'accuse	
October 30, 1921	The Iron Trail	
December 28, 1921	Orphans of the Storm	

=== 1922 ===
Release date	Title	Notes
January 22, 1922	The Ruling Passion	
February 12, 1922	A Doll's House	film is considered lost
March 19, 1922	Fair Lady	film is considered lost
April 23, 1922	The Glorious Adventure	
August 5, 1922	A Tailor-Made Man	
August 27, 1922	The Three Must-Get-Theres	
October 1, 1922	The Man Who Played God	
October 2, 1922	One Exciting Night	
October 18, 1922	Robin Hood	
November 12, 1922	Tess of the Storm Country	

=== 1923 ===
Release date	Title	Notes
February 15, 1923	The Girl I Loved	
March 5, 1923	The Shriek of Araby	
May 21, 1923	The White Rose	
September 3, 1923	Rosita	
October 1, 1923	A Woman of Paris (Note: Copyright owned by Roy Export S.A.S.; worldwide distribution rights are currently licensed to mk2, with U.K. rights sub-licensed to Curzon Film and U.S. rights sub-licensed to Janus Films and the Criterion Collection)	

=== 1924 ===
Release date	Title	Notes
February 21, 1924	America	produced by D. W. Griffith, Inc.
March 23, 1924	The Thief of Bagdad	Inducted into the National Film Registry in 1996
May 25, 1924	Dorothy Vernon of Haddon Hall	
December 5, 1924	Isn't Life Wonderful	

=== 1925 ===
Release date	Title	Notes
February 15, 1925	The Salvation Hunters	
April 14, 1925	Waking Up the Town	
June 15, 1925	Don Q, Son of Zorro	
June 26, 1925	The Gold Rush	Inducted into the National Film Registry in 1992
July 6, 1925	Wild Justice	film is considered lost
August 2, 1925	Sally of the Sawdust	
October 18, 1925	Little Annie Rooney	
November 8, 1925	The Eagle	
November 16, 1925	Stella Dallas (Note: Owned by the estate of Samuel Goldwyn, with distribution rights are held by Skydance Corporation with rights being split between the U.S. and internationally to its subsisidiaries Warner Bros. and to Miramax; Samuel Goldwyn Films also holds certain distribution rights)	distribution only; produced by Samuel Goldwyn Productions
December 27, 1925	Tumbleweeds	

=== 1926 ===
Release date	Title	Notes
1926	A Woman of the Sea	film is considered lost
February 15, 1926	Partners Again	distribution only; produced by Samuel Goldwyn Productions
March 8, 1926	The Black Pirate	Inducted into the National Film Registry in 1993
March 14, 1926	The Bat	
September 5, 1926	The Son of the Sheik	Inducted into the National Film Registry in 2006
September 19, 1926	Sparrows	Inducted into the National Film Registry in 2025
October 14, 1926	The Winning of Barbara Worth	distribution only; produced by Samuel Goldwyn Productions

=== 1927 ===
Release date	Title	Notes
January 27, 1927	The Night of Love	distribution only; produced by Samuel Goldwyn Productions
February 5, 1927	The General	Inaugural inductee of the National Film Registry in 1989
March 11, 1927	The Love of Sunya	
March 12, 1927	The Beloved Rogue	
March 19, 1927	Resurrection	film is considered lost
July 24, 1927	Topsy and Eva	
September 10, 1927	College	
September 18, 1927	The Magic Flame	distribution only; produced by Samuel Goldwyn Productions; film is considered lost
September 23, 1927	Two Arabian Knights	
October 31, 1927	My Best Girl	
November 3, 1927	The Devil Dancer	distribution only; produced by Samuel Goldwyn Productions; film is considered lost
November 21, 1927	The Gaucho	
December 2, 1927	Sorrell and Son	
December 31, 1927	The Dove	

=== 1928 ===
Release date	Title	Notes
January 6, 1928	The Circus	
January 7, 1928	Sadie Thompson	
January 24, 1928	Drums of Love	
February 4, 1928	The Garden of Eden	
March 23, 1928	Two Lovers	distribution only; produced by Samuel Goldwyn Productions
May 14, 1928	Ramona	
May 20, 1928	Steamboat Bill, Jr.	Inducted into the National Film Registry in 2016
May 27, 1928	Tempest	
September 1928	The Woman Disputed	
October 1928	Revenge	
October 12, 1928	The Battle of the Sexes	
November 17, 1928	The Awakening	distribution only; produced by Samuel Goldwyn Productions; film is considered lost

=== 1929 ===
Release date	Title	Notes
January 12, 1929	The Rescue	distribution only; produced by Samuel Goldwyn Productions
January 22, 1929	Lady of the Pavements	
February 21, 1929	The Iron Mask	
April 6, 1929	Coquette (Note: Owned by Warner Bros. (via Turner Entertainment Co.))	
April 20, 1929	Alibi	distribution only; produced by Feature Productions; Nominee of the Academy Award for Best Picture
May 2, 1929	Bulldog Drummond	
May 11, 1929	Eternal Love	
June 1, 1929	The Three Passions	
June 8, 1929	She Goes to War	
June 22, 1929	This Is Heaven	distribution only; produced by Samuel Goldwyn Productions; film is considered lost
August 24, 1929	Evangeline	
September 15, 1929	Three Live Ghosts	
October 12, 1929	Venus	film is considered lost
November 3, 1929	Condemned	distribution only; produced by Samuel Goldwyn Productions
November 11, 1929	The Trespasser	
November 16, 1929	The Locked Door	
November 30, 1929	The Taming of the Shrew	
December 28, 1929	New York Nights	

== 1930s ==
=== 1930 ===
Release date	Title	Notes
January 18, 1930	Lummox	
February 8, 1930	Be Yourself	
March 1, 1930	Puttin' On the Ritz	
March 15, 1930	Hell Harbor	
May 3, 1930	The Bad One	
May 3, 1930	One Romantic Night	
July 24, 1930	Raffles	distribution only; produced by Samuel Goldwyn Productions
August 30, 1930	The Eyes of the World	film is considered lost
September 13, 1930	What a Widow!	
October 5, 1930	Whoopee!	distribution only; produced by Samuel Goldwyn Productions
October 11, 1930	Du Barry, Woman of Passion	
November 8, 1930	Abraham Lincoln	distribution only; produced by Feature Productions; directed by D. W. Griffith
November 13, 1930	The Bat Whispers	
November 15, 1930	Hell's Angels (Note: Owned by Universal Pictures)	distribution only
November 28, 1930	The Lottery Bride	
December 20, 1930	The Devil to Pay!	distribution only; produced by Samuel Goldwyn Productions

=== 1931 ===
Release date	Title	Notes
January 14, 1931	One Heavenly Night	distribution only; produced by Samuel Goldwyn Productions
January 30, 1931	City Lights	Inducted into the National Film Registry in 1991
February 21, 1931	Reaching for the Moon	
March 14, 1931	Kiki	
April 4, 1931	The Front Page	Nominee of the Academy Award for Best Picture; Inducted into the National Film Registry in 2010
May 16, 1931	Indiscreet	
September 5, 1931	Street Scene (Note: Owned by Video-Cinema Films, Inc., with U.S. distribution rights currently licensed to Ignite Films, Corinth Films and Samuel Goldwyn Films)	distribution only; produced by Samuel Goldwyn Productions
October 3, 1931	Palmy Days	distribution only; produced by Samuel Goldwyn Productions
October 17, 1931	The Age for Love	distribution only; produced by The Caddo Company
October 28, 1931	The Unholy Garden	distribution only; produced by Samuel Goldwyn Productions
November 28, 1931	Corsair	
December 10, 1931	The Struggle	directed by D. W. Griffith, his last film
December 12, 1931	Around the World in 80 Minutes with Douglas Fairbanks	
December 17, 1931	Tonight or Never	distribution only; produced by Samuel Goldwyn Productions
December 26, 1931	Arrowsmith	distribution only; produced by Samuel Goldwyn Productions; Nominee of the Academy Award for Best Picture

=== 1932 ===
Release date	Title	Notes
January 23, 1932	Cock of the Air	
February 13, 1932	The Greeks Had a Word for Them	distribution only; produced by Samuel Goldwyn Productions
March 12, 1932	Sky Devils	
April 9, 1932	Scarface	distribution only Inducted into the National Film Registry in 1994
April 16, 1932	The Silver Lining	
April 25, 1932	Der Kongress tanzt	
May 11, 1932	Congress Dances	
August 4, 1932	White Zombie	
August 19, 1932	Mr. Robinson Crusoe	
October 12, 1932	Rain	
November 2, 1932	Magic Night	
November 17, 1932	The Kid from Spain	distribution only; produced by Samuel Goldwyn Productions
December 24, 1932	Cynara	distribution only; produced by Samuel Goldwyn Productions

=== 1933 ===
Release date	Title	Notes
February 3, 1933	Hallelujah, I'm a Bum (Note: Retained by MGM)	
March 11, 1933	Perfect Understanding	
March 16, 1933	Secrets	
May 19, 1933	I Cover the Waterfront	produced by Edward Small
June 28, 1933	Samarang	
August 25, 1933	Bitter Sweet	
September 3, 1933	The Masquerade	distribution only; produced by Samuel Goldwyn Productions
September 21, 1933	The Private Life of Henry VIII (Note: Owned by ITV Studios)	distribution only; produced by London Films Productions; Nominee of the Academy Award for Best Picture
September 29, 1933	The Emperor Jones	Inducted into the National Film Registry in 1999
October 7, 1933	The Bowery (Note: Owned by Disney (via 20th Century Studios))	distribution only; produced by Twentieth Century Pictures
November 2, 1933	Broadway Through a Keyhole	distribution only; produced by Twentieth Century Pictures
November 17, 1933	Blood Money	distribution only; produced by Twentieth Century Pictures
December 1, 1933	Advice to the Lovelorn	distribution only; produced by Twentieth Century Pictures
December 29, 1933	Roman Scandals	distribution only; produced by Samuel Goldwyn Productions

=== 1934 ===
Release date	Title	Notes
January 5, 1934	Gallant Lady	distribution only; produced by Twentieth Century Pictures
January 19, 1934	Moulin Rouge	distribution only; produced by Twentieth Century Pictures
January 26, 1934	Palooka	produced by Edward Small
February 1, 1934	Nana	distribution only; produced by Samuel Goldwyn Productions
February 9, 1934	The Rise of Catherine the Great	produced by London Films Productions
March 29, 1934	Looking for Trouble	distribution only; produced by Twentieth Century Pictures
April 7, 1934	The House of Rothschild	distribution only; produced by Twentieth Century Pictures; Nominee of the Academy Award for Best Picture
April 28, 1934	The Last Gentleman	distribution only; produced by Twentieth Century Pictures
May 18, 1934	Born to Be Bad	distribution only; produced by Twentieth Century Pictures
May 29, 1934	Sorrell and Son	
August 15, 1934	Bulldog Drummond Strikes Back	distribution only; produced by Twentieth Century Pictures
August 24, 1934	The Affairs of Cellini	distribution only; produced by Twentieth Century Pictures
September 7, 1934	The Count of Monte Cristo (Note: Co-owned by Universal Pictures (via DreamWorks Classics) and Shout! Studios (via Westchester Films))	produced by Edward Small
October 2, 1934	Our Daily Bread	Inducted into the National Film Registry in 2015
November 1, 1934	We Live Again	distribution only; produced by Samuel Goldwyn Productions
November 2, 1934	Transatlantic Merry-Go-Round	produced by Edward Small
November 10, 1934	Kid Millions	distribution only; produced by Samuel Goldwyn Productions
November 30, 1934	The Private Life of Don Juan	distribution only; produced by London Films Productions
December 21, 1934	The Queen's Affair	
December 23, 1934	Don Quixote	
December 23, 1934	The Mighty Barnum	distribution only; produced by Twentieth Century Pictures

=== 1935 ===
Release date	Title	Notes
January 25, 1935	Clive of India	distribution only; produced by Twentieth Century Pictures
February 7, 1935	The Scarlet Pimpernel	produced by London Films Productions
February 22, 1935	Folies Bergère de Paris	distribution only; produced by Twentieth Century Pictures
March 8, 1935	The Wedding Night	distribution only; produced by Samuel Goldwyn Productions
April 20, 1935	Les Misérables	distribution only, produced by Twentieth Century Pictures; Nominee of the Academy Award for Best Picture
April 28, 1935	Cardinal Richelieu	distribution only; produced by Twentieth Century Pictures
May 17, 1935	Let 'Em Have It	
May 24, 1935	Escape Me Never	
June 19, 1935	Nell Gwyn	distribution only; Herbert Wilcox Productions (for) British & Dominions
June 26, 1935	Sanders of the River	produced by London Films Productions
August 9, 1935	Call of the Wild	distribution only; produced by Twentieth Century Pictures
September 8, 1935	The Dark Angel	distribution only; produced by Samuel Goldwyn Productions
September 12, 1935	Red Salute	produced by Edward Small
October 13, 1935	Barbary Coast	distribution only; produced by Samuel Goldwyn Productions
November 7, 1935	The Melody Lingers On	produced by Edward Small
November 22, 1935	Splendor	distribution only; produced by Samuel Goldwyn Productions

=== 1936 ===
Release date	Title	Notes
January 9, 1936	Mimi	
January 24, 1936	Strike Me Pink	distribution only; produced by Samuel Goldwyn Productions
February 7, 1936	The Ghost Goes West	produced by London Films Productions
February 25, 1936	Modern Times	Inaugural inductee of the National Film Registry in 1989
March 18, 1936	These Three	distribution only; produced by Samuel Goldwyn Productions
April 2, 1936	Little Lord Fauntleroy (Note: Owned by Disney (via ABC))	distribution only; produced by Selznick International Pictures
April 17, 1936	Things to Come	produced by London Films Productions
April 27, 1936	The Amateur Gentleman	distribution only; produced by Criterion Film Productions
May 13, 1936	One Rainy Afternoon	
July 1, 1936	Moscow Nights	produced by London Films Productions
September 4, 1936	The Last of the Mohicans	produced by Edward Small
September 23, 1936	Dodsworth	distribution only; produced by Samuel Goldwyn Productions; Nominee of the Academy Award for Best Picture; Inducted into the National Film Registry in 1990
October 2, 1936	The Gay Desperado	
November 6, 1936	Come and Get It	distribution only; produced by Samuel Goldwyn Productions
November 19, 1936	The Garden of Allah	distribution only; produced by Selznick International Pictures
December 17, 1936	Accused	distribution only; produced by Criterion Film Productions
December 25, 1936	Rembrandt	produced by London Films Productions
December 25, 1936	Beloved Enemy	distribution only; produced by Samuel Goldwyn Productions

=== 1937 ===
Release date	Title	Notes
January 18, 1937	Men Are Not Gods	produced by London Films Productions
January 29, 1937	You Only Live Once (Note: Owned by Shout! Studios (via Westchester Films))	
February 19, 1937	The Man Who Could Work Miracles	produced by London Films Productions
February 25, 1937	Storm in a Teacup	produced by London Films Productions
March 5, 1937	Fire Over England	produced by London Films Productions
March 5, 1937	History Is Made at Night	produced by Walter Wanger Productions
April 5, 1937	Elephant Boy	produced by London Films Productions
April 18, 1937	A Night of Terror	
April 27, 1937	A Star Is Born (Note: Owned by Warner Bros.)	distribution only; produced by Selznick International Pictures; Nominee of the Academy Award for Best Picture
May 7, 1937	Woman Chases Man	distribution only; produced by Samuel Goldwyn Productions
May 19, 1937	Dreaming Lips	
June 14, 1937	When Thief Meets Thief	
July 2, 1937	Dark Journey	
July 23, 1937	Knight Without Armor	produced by London Films Productions
August 6, 1937	Stella Dallas	distribution only; produced by Samuel Goldwyn Productions
August 27, 1937	Dead End	distribution only; produced by Samuel Goldwyn Productions; Nominee of the Academy Award for Best Picture
September 3, 1937	The Prisoner of Zenda	distribution only; produced by Selznick International Pictures; Inducted into the National Film Registry in 1997
October 29, 1937	Stand-In	
November 9, 1937	The Hurricane (Note: Owned by the estate of Samuel Goldwyn; U.S. rights are owned by United Artists' parent MGM while Miramax handles international distribution)	distribution only; produced by Samuel Goldwyn Productions
November 11, 1937	Murder on Diamond Row	produced by London Films Productions
November 19, 1937	52nd Street	
November 25, 1937	Nothing Sacred	distribution only; produced by Selznick International Pictures

=== 1938 ===
Release date	Title	Notes
January 14, 1938	Action for Slander	distribution only; produced by London Film Productions
January 14, 1938	I Met My Love Again	
January 15, 1938	The Divorce of Lady X	produced by London Films Productions
February 4, 1938	The Goldwyn Follies	distribution only; produced by Samuel Goldwyn Productions
February 11, 1938	The Adventures of Tom Sawyer	distribution only; produced by Selznick International Pictures
March 18, 1938	Gaiety Girls	produced by London Films Productions
April 10, 1938	Return of the Scarlet Pimpernel	produced by London Films Productions
April 15, 1938	The Adventures of Marco Polo	distribution only; produced by Samuel Goldwyn Productions
April 25, 1938	Troopship	produced by London Films Productions
May 9, 1938	Moonlight Sonata	
June 17, 1938	Blockade	
August 1, 1938	South Riding	distribution only; Victor Saville Productions/London Film Productions
August 5, 1938	Algiers	distribution only; produced by Walter Wanger Productions
August 7, 1938	Vogues of 1938	
September 9, 1938	Dreamers of Glory	
September 29, 1938	The Drum	distribution only; produced by London Film Productions
October 14, 1938	There Goes My Heart (Note: Owned by Chicken Soup for the Soul Entertainment (via Halcyon Studios))	
November 3, 1938	The Young in Heart	distribution only; produced by Selznick International Pictures
November 17, 1938	The Cowboy and the Lady	distribution only; produced by Samuel Goldwyn Productions
December 28, 1938	Trade Winds	
December 29, 1938	The Duke of West Point	produced by Edward Small

=== 1939 ===
Release date	Title	Notes
January 12, 1939	Topper Takes a Trip	produced by Hal Roach
February 10, 1939	Made for Each Other	distribution only; produced by Selznick International Pictures
February 17, 1939	King of the Turf	produced by Edward Small
March 2, 1939	Stagecoach	distribution only; produced by Walter Wanger Productions; Nominee of the Academy Award for Best Picture; Inducted into the National Film Registry in 1995
April 7, 1939	Wuthering Heights	distribution only; produced by Samuel Goldwyn Productions; Nominee of the Academy Award for Best Picture; Inducted into the National Film Registry in 2007
April 9, 1939	Prison Without Bars	produced by London Films Productions
April 21, 1939	Zenobia	produced by Hal Roach
May 26, 1939	Captain Fury	produced by Hal Roach
July 13, 1939	The Man in the Iron Mask	produced by Edward Small
July 28, 1939	Winter Carnival	
August 3, 1939	The Four Feathers	produced by London Films Productions
August 18, 1939	They Shall Have Music	distribution only; produced by Samuel Goldwyn Productions
September 22, 1939	Intermezzo	distribution only; produced by Selznick International Pictures
September 29, 1939	The Real Glory	distribution only; produced by Samuel Goldwyn Productions
October 7, 1939	Eternally Yours	
October 26, 1939	The Housekeeper's Daughter	
December 22, 1939	Slightly Honorable	
December 29, 1939	Raffles	distribution only; produced by Samuel Goldwyn Productions
December 30, 1939	Of Mice and Men	Nominee of the Academy Award for Best Picture

== 1940s ==
=== 1940 ===
Release date	Title	Notes
January 19, 1940	The Lion Has Wings	produced by London Films Productions
February 16, 1940	A Chump at Oxford	produced by Hal Roach
March 1, 1940	The House Across the Bay	
March 22, 1940	My Son, My Son!	distribution only; produced by Edward Small
March 29, 1940	Over the Moon	produced by London Films Productions
April 5, 1940	One Million B.C.	produced by Hal Roach
April 12, 1940	Rebecca	distribution only; produced by Selznick International Pictures; Winner of the Academy Award for Best Picture; Inducted into the National Film Registry in 2018
May 3, 1940	Saps at Sea	produced by Hal Roach
May 17, 1940	Turnabout	produced by Hal Roach
May 20, 1940	Conquest of the Air	produced by London Films Productions
May 24, 1940	Our Town	distribution only; produced by Sol Lesser
July 19, 1940	South of Pago Pago	distribution only; produced by Edward Small
August 9, 1940	Captain Caution	produced by Hal Roach
August 16, 1940	Foreign Correspondent	distribution only; produced by Walter Wanger; Nominee of the Academy Award for Best Picture
August 30, 1940	Kit Carson	distribution only; produced by Edward Small
September 13, 1940	Pastor Hall	
September 20, 1940	The Westerner	distribution only; produced by Samuel Goldwyn Productions
November 11, 1940	The Long Voyage Home	distribution only; produced by Argosy Pictures; Nominee of the Academy Award for Best Picture
November 29, 1940	Contraband	distribution only; produced by British National Films Company
December 25, 1940	The Thief of Bagdad	distribution only; produced by London Films Productions

=== 1941 ===
Release date	Title	Notes
January 10, 1941	The Son of Monte Cristo	distribution only; produced by Edward Small
February 18, 1941	Road Show (Note: Owned by Paramount Pictures (via Melange Pictures))	
February 21, 1941	Cheers for Miss Bishop	
February 27, 1941	So Ends Our Night	
March 7, 1941	The Great Dictator	produced by Charles Chaplin Film Corporation; Nominee of the Academy Award for Best Picture; Inducted into the National Film Registry in 1997
March 21, 1941	Topper Returns	produced by Hal Roach
April 3, 1941	Pot o' Gold	distribution only
April 20, 1941	That Uncertain Feeling	distribution only; produced by Ernst Lubitsch/Sol Lesser Productions
April 30, 1941	That Hamilton Woman	produced by Alexander Korda Films, Inc
May 14, 1941	Major Barbara (Note: Owned by Valerie Delacorte and the Society of Authors, representing George Bernard Shaw, with U.S. distribution rights currently licensed to Janus Films and the Criterion Collection under the Eclipse brand)	distribution only; produced by Gabriel Pascal Productions
June 13, 1941	Broadway Limited	produced by Hal Roach
June 23, 1941	Kukan	
July 4, 1941	Sailors Three	
September 10, 1941	New Wine	
September 12, 1941	Tanks a Million	produced by Hal Roach
September 25, 1941	Lydia	distribution only; produced by London Films Productions
October 16, 1941	International Lady	distribution only; produced by Edward Small
October 17, 1941	Niagara Falls	produced by Hal Roach
October 31, 1941	Sundown	distribution only
October 31, 1941	All-American Co-Ed	
November 14, 1941	Miss Polly	produced by Hal Roach
November 28, 1941	The Corsican Brothers	distribution only; produced by Edward Small
November 28, 1941	Fiesta	produced by Hal Roach
December 25, 1941	The Shanghai Gesture	

=== 1942 ===
Release date	Title	Notes
January 2, 1942	Hay Foot	produced by Hal Roach
January 31, 1942	Brooklyn Orchid	produced by Hal Roach
February 12, 1942	Pimpernel Smith	U.S. distribution only; produced by British National Films
March 6, 1942	To Be or Not to Be	distribution only; produced by Romaine Film Corp; Inducted into the National Film Registry in 1996
March 13, 1942	Dudes Are Pretty People	produced by Hal Roach
April 3, 1942	Rudyard Kipling's Jungle Book	distribution only; produced by Alexander Korda Films, Inc.
April 16, 1942	About Face	distribution only; produced by Hal Roach Studios
April 16, 1942	A Gentleman After Dark	
April 30, 1942	Twin Beds	distribution only; produced by Edward Small
May 22, 1942	Flying with Music	distribution only; produced by Hal Roach
May 23, 1942	Ships with Wings	
May 29, 1942	Miss Annie Rooney	distribution only; produced by Edward Small
June 21, 1942	Friendly Enemies	produced by Edward Small
October 16, 1942	One of Our Aircraft Is Missing	U.S. distribution only; produced by British National Films
October 22, 1942	The Devil with Hitler	produced by Hal Roach
October 23, 1942	Undercover Man	Hopalong Cassidy film; produced by Harry Sherman
October 27, 1942	The Moon and Sixpence	distribution only; produced by David L. Loew-Albert Lewin, Inc
October 30, 1942	I Married a Witch	sold to UA for release; co-produced by Paramount Pictures and Cinema Guild Productions
November 13, 1942	Silver Queen	
November 20, 1942	Fall In	produced by Hal Roach
November 27, 1942	Jacare	
December 11, 1942	American Empire	
December 18, 1942	Lost Canyon	Hopalong Cassidy film; produced by Harry Sherman
December 23, 1942	In Which We Serve (Note: Co-owned by ITV Studios)	U.S. distribution only; produced by Two Cities Films; Nominee of the Academy Award for Best Picture
December 31, 1942	The McGuerins from Brooklyn	

=== 1943 ===
Release date	Title	Notes
January 15, 1943	The Powers Girl	
January 22, 1943	The Crystal Ball	co-produced by Paramount Pictures
January 29, 1943	Calaboose	
February 5, 1943	Young and Willing	distribution only; produced by Paramount Pictures and Cinema Guild Productions
February 5, 1943	The Outlaw	distribution only; produced by Howard Hughes Productions
March 12, 1943	Hoppy Serves a Writ	Hopalong Cassidy film; produced by Harry Sherman
April 2, 1943	Border Patrol	Hopalong Cassidy film; produced by Harry Sherman
April 15, 1943	Hangmen Also Die!	
April 16, 1943	Taxi, Mister	produced by Hal Roach
May 1, 1943	Lady of Burlesque	distribution only
May 14, 1943	Buckskin Frontier	
May 21, 1943	Prairie Chickens	produced by Hal Roach
May 28, 1943	The Leather Burners	Hopalong Cassidy film; produced by Harry Sherman
May 28, 1943	Nazty Nuisance	produced by Hal Roach
June 18, 1943	Colt Comrades	Hopalong Cassidy film; produced by Harry Sherman
June 24, 1943	Stage Door Canteen	distribution only; produced by Principal Artists Productions
June 29, 1943	Yanks Ahoy	produced by Hal Roach
July 11, 1943	The Foreman Went to France	
July 17, 1943	Victory Through Air Power (Note: Owned by Disney (via Walt Disney Pictures))	distribution only; produced by Walt Disney Productions
August 2, 1943	Hi Diddle Diddle	
September 3, 1943	Johnny Come Lately	distribution only; produced by William Cagney Productions
September 10, 1943	The Kansan	
October 1, 1943	Bar 20	Hopalong Cassidy film; produced by Harry Sherman
November 5, 1943	False Colors	Hopalong Cassidy film; produced by Harry Sherman
December 3, 1943	Riders of the Deadline	Hopalong Cassidy film; produced by Harry Sherman
December 24, 1943	Jack London	
December 30, 1943	Three Russian Girls	
December 31, 1943	The Woman of the Town	

=== 1944 ===
Release date	Title	Notes
February 8, 1944	Texas Masquerade	Hopalong Cassidy film; produced by Harry Sherman
February 11, 1944	The Bridge of San Luis Rey	produced by Benedict Bogeaus
March 3, 1944	Voice in the Wind	
March 17, 1944	Knickerbocker Holiday	
April 7, 1944	Up in Mabel's Room	produced by Edward Small
April 28, 1944	Lumberjack	Hopalong Cassidy film; produced by Harry Sherman
May 28, 1944	It Happened Tomorrow	distribution only
May 31, 1944	Mystery Man	distribution only; Hopalong Cassidy film; produced by Harry Sherman
June 21, 1944	Song of the Open Road	
June 23, 1944	Forty Thieves	Hopalong Cassidy film; produced by Harry Sherman
June 30, 1944	Sensations of 1945	
July 2, 1944	The Hairy Ape	
July 14, 1944	Summer Storm	distribution only
July 20, 1944	Since You Went Away	distribution only; produced by Selznick International Pictures; Nominee of the Academy Award for Best Picture
August 4, 1944	Abroad with Two Yanks	distribution only; produced by Edward Small Productions
November 21, 1944	Dark Waters	produced by Benedict Bogeaus
November 23, 1944	Three Is a Family	
December 8, 1944	Guest in the House	distribution only; produced by Hunt Stromberg Productions
December 29, 1944	Tomorrow, the World!	

=== 1945 ===
Release date	Title	Notes
January 5, 1945	I'll Be Seeing You	distribution only; produced by Selznick International Pictures
January 6, 1945	Mr. Emmanuel	
March 31, 1945	Delightfully Dangerous	
March 31, 1945	I'll Be Seeing You	
April 7, 1945	Brewster's Millions	produced by Edward Small
April 21, 1945	It's in the Bag!	distribution only; produced by Manhattan Productions
April 30, 1945	The Southerner	
May 4, 1945	The Life and Death of Colonel Blimp	distribution only; produced by The Archers
May 25, 1945	The Great John L.	
June 22, 1945	Bedside Manner	
June 28, 1945	Blood on the Sun	distribution only; produced by William Cagney Productions
July 13, 1945	The Story of G.I. Joe	Inducted into the National Film Registry in 2009
July 27, 1945	Guest Wife	distribution only; produced by Greentree Productions
October 3, 1945	Blithe Spirit	distribution only; produced by Two Cities Films
October 12, 1945	Love on the Dole	distribution only; produced by British National Films
October 17, 1945	Paris Underground	
November 15, 1945	The Way to the Stars	distribution only; produced by Two Cities Films
November 22, 1945	Captain Kidd	distribution only; produced by Benedict Bogeaus
November 30, 1945	Getting Gertie's Garter	distribution only; produced by Edward Small Productions
December 28, 1945	Spellbound	distribution only; produced by Selznick International Pictures; Nominee of the Academy Award for Best Picture

=== 1946 ===
Release date	Title	Notes
January 11, 1946	Abilene Town	distribution only; produced by Guild Productions
January 25, 1946	Whistle Stop	distribution only; produced by Nero Films
February 15, 1946	The Diary of a Chambermaid	distribution only; produced by Benedict Bogeaus
February 26, 1946	Breakfast in Hollywood	
March 1, 1946	Young Widow	
May 10, 1946	A Night in Casablanca	Produced by Loma Vista Films, Inc.
June 17, 1946	Henry V	distribution only; produced by Two Cities Films; Nominee of the Academy Award for Best Picture
July 19, 1946	A Scandal in Paris	distribution only; produced by Arnold Pressburger Films
August 2, 1946	Mr. Ace	produced by Benedict Bogeaus
September 6, 1946	The Bachelor's Daughters	
September 6, 1946	Caesar and Cleopatra	U.S. distribution only; produced by Eagle-Lion Films
September 20, 1946	Angel on My Shoulder	
October 20, 1946	Little Iodine	
October 25, 1946	The Strange Woman	distribution only; co-produced by Hunt Stromberg Productions and Mars Film Corporation
November 15, 1946	The Devil's Playground	Hopalong Cassidy film; produced by William Boyd
November 17, 1946	The Chase	distribution only; produced by Nero Films
December 13, 1946	Susie Steps Out	
December 27, 1946	Abie's Irish Rose	distribution only; produced by Bing Crosby Producers

=== 1947 ===
Release date	Title	Notes
January 31, 1947	Fool's Gold	Hopalong Cassidy film; produced by William Boyd
February 21, 1947	The Fabulous Dorseys	
February 28, 1947	Carnegie Hall	
March 16, 1947	The Red House	distribution only; produced by Sol Lesser Productions
March 28, 1947	Unexpected Guest	Hopalong Cassidy film; produced by William Boyd
April 4, 1947	The Sin of Harold Diddlebock	
April 11, 1947	Monsieur Verdoux	
April 18, 1947	New Orleans	
April 20, 1947	The Macomber Affair	produced by Benedict Bogeaus
April 25, 1947	The Private Affairs of Bel Ami	
May 2, 1947	Ramrod	distribution only; produced by Enterprise Productions
May 9, 1947	The Adventures of Don Coyote	produced by Comet Productions
May 14, 1947	The Other Love	distribution only; produced by Enterprise Productions
May 15, 1947	Fun on a Weekend	
May 16, 1947	Dishonored Lady	distribution only; produced by Hunt Stromberg Productions
May 23, 1947	Dangerous Venture	
May 30, 1947	Copacabana	distribution only; produced by Beacon Productions
June 21, 1947	Stork Bites Man	
July 1, 1947	The Marauders	Hopalong Cassidy film; produced by William Boyd
July 18, 1947	Hoppy's Holiday	Hopalong Cassidy film; produced by William Boyd
August 23, 1947	Curley	produced by Hal Roach
August 29, 1947	The Hal Roach Comedy Carnival	produced by Hal Roach
August 29, 1947	The Fabulous Joe	produced by Hal Roach
August 30, 1947	The Roosevelt Story	
September 5, 1947	Lured	distribution only; produced by Hunt Stromberg Productions
September 12, 1947	Heaven Only Knows	
October 15, 1947	Intrigue	distribution only; produced by Star Films Inc.
October 31, 1947	Christmas Eve	distribution only; produced by Benedict Bogeaus
November 9, 1947	Body and Soul	distribution only; produced by Enterprise Productions

=== 1948 ===
Release date	Title	Notes
January 1948	Fanny by Gaslight	produced by Gainsborough Pictures
February 3, 1948	On Our Merry Way	distribution only; produced by Benedict Bogeaus
March 6, 1948	Arch of Triumph	distribution only; produced by Enterprise Productions
March 14, 1948	The Angry God	
March 15, 1948	Here Comes Trouble	
March 16, 1948	Sleep, My Love	
March 19, 1948	Silent Conflict	Hopalong Cassidy film; produced by William Boyd
April 9, 1948	Who Killed Doc Robbin	produced by Hal Roach
April 30, 1948	The Dead Don't Dream	Hopalong Cassidy film; produced by William Boyd
June 11, 1948	Sinister Journey	Hopalong Cassidy film; produced by William Boyd
June 1948	So This Is New York	distribution only; produced by Enterprise Productions
July 16, 1948	Texas, Brooklyn & Heaven	
July 21, 1948	The Vicious Circle	
July 23, 1948	Borrowed Trouble	Hopalong Cassidy film; produced by William Boyd
August 3, 1948	Four Faces West	distribution only; produced by The Enterprise Studios
August 24, 1948	Pitfall	distribution only; produced Regal Films
September 3, 1948	The Time of Your Life	
September 10, 1948	False Paradise	Hopalong Cassidy film; produced by William Boyd
September 17, 1948	Red River	distribution only; produced by Monterey Productions; Inducted into the National Film Registry in 1990
September 24, 1948	Urubu	
October 8, 1948	Strange Gamble	Hopalong Cassidy film; produced by William Boyd
October 15, 1948	An Innocent Affair	
November 5, 1948	My Dear Secretary	
November 19, 1948	High Fury	
December 15, 1948	The Valiant Hombre	

=== 1949 ===
Release date	Title	Notes
January 1949	Siren of Atlantis	
February 25, 1949	Cover Up	distribution only
March 11, 1949	Jigsaw	distribution only
April 1, 1949	Impact	distribution only
April 22, 1949	The Crooked Way	distribution only; produced by Benedict Bogeaus
May 2, 1949	Outpost in Morocco	
May 12, 1949	Home of the Brave	produced by Stanley Kramer
May 13, 1949	The Gay Amigo	
May 20, 1949	Champion	distribution only; produced by Stanley Kramer
May 26, 1949	The Lucky Stiff	
May 27, 1949	Africa Screams	distribution only
June 14, 1949	The Daring Caballero	
August 13, 1949	Too Late for Tears	distribution only; produced by Hunt Stromberg Productions
August 19, 1949	Black Magic	distribution only; produced by Edward Small
September 30, 1949	Red Light	distribution only; produced by Roy Del Ruth Productions
October 5, 1949	Under the Sun of Rome	
October 7, 1949	Satan's Cradle	
October 26, 1949	Without Honor	
October 26, 1949	Just a Big Simple Life	
November 4, 1949	The Big Wheel	
November 8, 1949	The Great Dan Patch	
November 25, 1949	A Kiss for Corliss	
December 23, 1949	Mrs. Mike	distribution only; produced by Regal Films

== 1950s ==
=== 1950 ===
Release date	Title	Notes
January 6, 1950	Davy Crockett, Indian Scout	produced by Edward Small
January 20, 1950	Gun Crazy	distribution only; produced by King Brothers Productions; Inducted into the National Film Registry in 1998
February 17, 1950	Johnny Holiday	distribution only; produced by Alcorn Productions
February 24, 1950	The Girl from San Lorenzo	
March 3, 1950	Love Happy	distribution only; produced by Artists Alliance, Inc.
March 10, 1950	Tehran	
March 10, 1950	The Great Plane Robbery	
March 24, 1950	Quicksand	distribution only
April 21, 1950	D.O.A.	distribution only Inducted into the National Film Registry in 2004
May 5, 1950	Johnny One-Eye	distribution only; produced by Benedict Bogeaus
May 11, 1950	Champagne for Caesar	
May 20, 1950	So Young, So Bad	
June 16, 1950	The Iroquois Trail	produced by Edward Small
June 30, 1950	If This Be Sin	U.S. distribution only; produced by London Films
July 7, 1950	The Second Woman	distribution only
July 7, 1950	Once a Thief	
July 20, 1950	The Men	produced by Stanley Kramer
July 26, 1950	The Underworld Story	distribution only; produced by FilmCraft Productions
August 4, 1950	The Admiral Was a Lady	distribution only; produced by Roxbury Productions
October 22, 1950	The Kangaroo Kid	
November 16, 1950	Cyrano de Bergerac	distribution only; produced by Stanley Kramer; Inducted into the National Film Registry in 2022
December 12, 1950	The Sound of Fury	distribution only; produced by Robert Stillman Productions

=== 1951 ===
Release date	Title	Notes
1951	Cloudburst	
February 8, 1951	They Were Not Divided	
March 8, 1951	Three Husbands	
March 29, 1951	So Long at the Fair	
April 6, 1951	The Scarf	
April 17, 1951	Circle of Danger	
April 20, 1951	When I Grow Up	
April 27, 1951	The First Legion	
April 27, 1951	The Man from Planet X	
April 30, 1951	Skipalong Rosenbloom	
May 18, 1951	New Mexico	
June 11, 1951	Four in a Jeep	
June 14, 1951	The Man with My Face	distribution only
June 28, 1951	Three Steps North	
July 1, 1951	The Prowler	distribution only
July 7, 1951	Queen for a Day	Robert Stillman Productions
July 13, 1951	He Ran All the Way	distribution only
July 30, 1951	Oliver Twist	distribution only; produced by Cineguild; first released in the UK in 1948
July 1951	Two Gals and a Guy	Produced by Weisner Brothers for Eagle-Lion Films
August 10, 1951	Pardon My French	
August 24, 1951	St. Benny the Dip	distribution only
September 5, 1951	Wicked City	
September 9, 1951	Gold Raiders	
September 18, 1951	Mr. Peek-a-Boo	
September 21, 1951	Mister Drake's Duck	Angel Productions/Douglas Fairbanks Productions
September 24, 1951	The Well	
October 9, 1951	Fort Defiance	
October 16, 1951	The River	distribution only; produced by Oriental International Films
November 2, 1951	Tom Brown's Schooldays	distribution only; produced by Talisman Productions
November 13, 1951	The Big Night	
December 2, 1951	Scrooge	U.S. distribution only; produced by George Minter Productions
December 31, 1951	Hotel Sahara	

=== 1952 ===
Release date	Title	Notes
January 6, 1952	Another Man's Poison	
January 6, 1952	The Lady Says No	distribution only; produced by Robert Stillman Productions
January 11, 1952	Chicago Calling	theatrical distribution only
January 15, 1952	A Tale of Five Cities	
January 31, 1952	The Green Glove	distribution only
February 5, 1952	Obsessed	U.S. distribution only; produced by Romulus Films
February 8, 1952	Buffalo Bill in Tomahawk Territory	
February 20, 1952	The African Queen (Note: Owned by Paramount Pictures)	U.S. distribution only; produced by Horizon Pictures and Romulus Films; Inducted into the National Film Registry in 1994
February 22, 1952	One Big Affair	First film in the post-February 1952 library owned by MGM
February 28, 1952	Royal Journey	
March 19, 1952	Mutiny	
March 26, 1952	The Captive City	
May 8, 1952	Without Warning!	distribution only
May 15, 1952	Red Planet Mars	
May 19, 1952	The Singing Princess	distribution only
May 23, 1952	The Fighter	
May 29, 1952	Actor's and Sin	
June 20, 1952	Confidence Girl	
July 24, 1952	High Noon	distribution only; produced by Stanley Kramer Productions; Nominee of the Academy Award for Best Picture; Inaugural inductee of the National Film Registry in 1989
August 4, 1952	Saturday Island	distribution only; produced by Coronado Productions
August 12, 1952	Park Row	
September 12, 1952	Untamed Women	
September 26, 1952	The Ring	
October 15, 1952	The Thief	
October 23, 1952	Limelight	distribution only; produced by Celebrated Productions
November 11, 1952	Kansas City Confidential	distribution only; produced by Edward Small
November 30, 1952	Bwana Devil	first 3-D feature film
December 4, 1952	Outpost in Malaya	
December 7, 1952	Babes in Bagdad	
December 14, 1952	Monsoon	
December 23, 1952	Moulin Rouge	U.S. distribution only; produced by Romulus Films; Nominee of the Academy Award for Best Picture

=== 1953 ===
Release date	Title	Notes
1953	Genghis Khan	Except in the Philippines, worldwide distribution only
January 1, 1953	The Gay Adventure	
January 23, 1953	Guerrilla Girl	
January 30, 1953	Luxury Girls	
February 18, 1953	The Magnetic Monster	produced by Ivan Tors
February 27, 1953	The Bandits of Corsica	produced by Edward Small
March 27, 1953	Son of the Renegade	
April 22, 1953	Venetian Bird	
April 28, 1953	Mahatma Gandhi: 20th Century Prophet	
May 8, 1953	That Man from Tangier	
May 15, 1953	Rough Shoot	
May 15, 1953	Phantom from Space	
May 27, 1953	Raiders of the Seven Seas	produced by Edward Small
June 10, 1953	The Twonky	
June 19, 1953	The Neanderthal Man	produced by Edward Small
June 26, 1953	The Marshal's Daughter	
July 8, 1953	The Moon Is Blue (Note: Owned by Otto Preminger Films, Ltd.)	
July 10, 1953	Return to Paradise	
July 15, 1953	Fort Algiers	
July 20, 1953	Volcano	
July 22, 1953	My Heart Goes Crazy	
July 24, 1953	Gun Belt	produced by Edward Small
July 31, 1953	No Escape	
July 31, 1953	Vice Squad	
August 7, 1953	Melba	
August 14, 1953	I, the Jury (Note: Owned by StudioCanal, with U.S. distribution rights licensed to Rialto Pictures and Lionsgate)	distribution only; produced by Parklane Pictures Inc.
August 28, 1953	War Paint	produced by Aubrey Schenck
September 4, 1953	Sabre Jet	produced by Edward Small
September 12, 1953	Captain Scarlett	
September 18, 1953	The Joe Louis Story	distribution only
September 25, 1953	The Fake	
September 30, 1953	Donovan's Brain	
October 2, 1953	Mantrap	
October 3, 1953	99 River Street	distribution only; produced by Edward Small
October 9, 1953	The Steel Lady	produced by Edward Small
October 23, 1953	The Village	
October 27, 1953	The Story of Gilbert and Sullivan	distribution only; produced by London Films
November 9, 1953	Stranger on the Prowl	
November 13, 1953	Shark River	
November 18, 1953	The Man Between	U.S. distribution only; produced by London Films
November 20, 1953	Captain John Smith and Pocahontas	produced by Edward Small
November 27, 1953	Song of the Land	
December 2, 1953	Yesterday and Today	
December 9, 1953	The Conquest of Everest	U.S. distribution only; produced by Group 3/British Lion
December 9, 1953	Wicked Woman	Produced by Edward Small
December 16, 1953	Die Jungfrau auf dem Dach	German language version of The Moon Is Blue
December 17, 1953	Act of Love	distribution only; produced by Benagoss Productions

=== 1954 ===
Release date	Title	Notes
January 14, 1954	Riders to the Stars	produced by Ivan Tors
January 15, 1954	Personal Affair	
January 27, 1954	Go, Man, Go!	
February 5, 1954	Beachhead	produced by Aubrey Schenck
February 10, 1954	Dragon's Gold	
February 22, 1954	Top Banana	
February 27, 1954	Overland Pacific	produced by Edward Small
March 1, 1954	The Scarlet Spear	
March 1, 1954	South of Algiers	
March 2, 1954	A Queen's World Tour	
March 3, 1954	Heidi	
March 12, 1954	Beat the Devil (Note: Owned by Sony Pictures (under Columbia Pictures))	U.S. distribution only; produced by Romulus Films, Dear Film, and Santana Pictures Corporation
April 1, 1954	Southwest Passage	produced by Edward Small
April 15, 1954	Witness to Murder	
April 25, 1954	The Lone Gun	
May 20, 1954	Captain Kidd and the Slave Girl	produced by Edward Small
May 26, 1954	The Long Wait	
May 1954	The Yellow Tomahawk	
June 4, 1954	Challenge the Wild	
June 5, 1954	Gog	distribution only; produced by Ivan Tors
June 14, 1954	Hobson's Choice	U.S. distribution only; produced by London Film Productions/British Lion
June 18, 1954	The Million Pound Note	U.S. distribution only; produced by Group Film Productions (UK)
June 30, 1954	Return to Treasure Island	
July 1, 1954	The Lawless Rider	
July 9, 1954	Apache	produced by Hecht-Lancaster Productions and Linden Productions
July 28, 1954	The Diamond Wizard	
July 28, 1954	Crossed Swords	
August 2, 1954	Victory at Sea	
August 5, 1954	Adventures of Robinson Crusoe	distribution only; produced in Mexico by Producciones Tepeyac
August 5, 1954	Malta Story	U.S. distribution only; produced by Theta Film Productions
September 1, 1954	The Little Kidnappers	U.S. distribution only; produced by Group Film Productions
September 3, 1954	Down Three Dark Streets	produced by Edward Small and Levy-Gardner-Laven
September 4, 1954	Khyber Patrol	produced by Edward Small
September 4, 1954	Jesse James' Women	
September 17, 1954	Suddenly	distribution only
September 29, 1954	The Barefoot Contessa	distribution only; produced by Figaro; filmed in Italy
September 1954	Shield for Murder	produced by Aubrey Schenck
October 4, 1954	Operation Manhunt	
October 6, 1954	Sitting Bull	
October 29, 1954	The Golden Mistress	
November 4, 1954	You Know What Sailors Are	
November 5, 1954	Beautiful Stranger	
November 1954	The White Orchid	
November 1954	The Snow Creature	
December 21, 1954	Romeo and Juliet	U.S. distribution only; produced by Universalcine, Verona Produzione (Italy)
December 25, 1954	Vera Cruz	produced by Hecht-Lancaster Productions and Flora Productions
December 31, 1954	Black Tuesday	
December 1954	The Steel Cage	

=== 1955 ===
Release date	Title	Notes
January 15, 1955	The Beachcomber	U.S. distribution only; produced by London Independent Producers
January 26, 1955	Battle Taxi	produced by Ivan Tors
February 2, 1955	Sabaka	
March 3, 1955	Big House, U.S.A.	produced by Aubrey Schenck
March 23, 1955	Stranger on Horseback	
April 10, 1955	The Purple Plain	
April 11, 1955	Canyon Crossroads	
April 11, 1955	Marty	produced by Hecht-Lancaster Productions and Steven Productions; Winner of the Academy Award for Best Picture; Inducted into the National Film Registry in 1994
April 15, 1955	A Bullet for Joey	
April 28, 1955	Kiss Me Deadly	Inducted into the National Film Registry in 1999
May 30, 1955	Robbers' Roost	
May 1955	Top of the World	
June 5, 1955	The Big Bluff	distribution only
June 21, 1955	Summertime	distribution only; produced by London Films
June 28, 1955	Not as a Stranger	Produced by Stanley Kramer
June 1955	The Sea Shall Not Have Them	distribution only
June 1955	Break to Freedom	U.S. distribution only; produced by Angel Productions
July 22, 1955	The Kentuckian	produced by Hecht-Lancaster Productions and James Productions
July 25, 1955	The Man Who Loved Redheads	U.S. distribution only; produced by London Films
July 26, 1955	The Night of the Hunter	Inducted into the National Film Registry in 1992 produced by Paul Gregory Productions
August 1955	The Naked Street	produced by Edward Small
September 12, 1955	Othello	distribution only; produced by Marceau Films
October 1, 1955	Killer's Kiss	
October 4, 1955	Fort Yuma	produced by Aubrey Schenck
October 25, 1955	The Big Knife	
October 29, 1955	Gentlemen Marry Brunettes	
November 5, 1955	Man with the Gun	
November 18, 1955	Desert Sands	produced by Aubrey Schenck
November 29, 1955	The Good Die Young	
December 12, 1955	Heidi and Peter	
December 14, 1955	The Man with the Golden Arm	produced by Otto Preminger Films; Inducted into the National Film Registry in 2020
December 16, 1955	Storm Fear	
December 21, 1955	The Indian Fighter	produced by Bryna Productions
December 21, 1955	Top Gun	produced by Edward Small

=== 1956 ===
Release date	Title	Notes
1956	Aan	
1956	The Tiger and the Flame	produced by Minerva Movietone; dubbed Indian film originally released as Jhansi Ki Rani
1956	The Extra Day	
January 1956	Three Bad Sisters	produced by Aubrey Schenck
February 1, 1956	Let's Make Up	
February 3, 1956	The Killer Is Loose	
February 8, 1956	Time Table	
February 1956	Manfish	
March 1956	Comanche	
March 1956	Ghost Town	
March 27, 1956	Patterns	
March 28, 1956	Alexander the Great	
April 26, 1956	The Quatermass Xperiment	produced by Hammer Film Productions
April 1956	The Broken Star	produced by Aubrey Schenck
May 3, 1956	Unidentified Flying Objects: The True Story of Flying Saucers	produced by Ivan Tors
May 9, 1956	Crime Against Joe	produced by Aubrey Shenck
May 11, 1956	Nightmare	produced by Pine-Thomas Productions
May 28, 1956	Foreign Intrigue	
May 30, 1956	Trapeze	produced by Hecht-Lancaster Productions, Joanna Productions and Susan Productions
May 1956	Quincannon, Frontier Scout	produced by Aubrey Schenck
June 6, 1956	The Killing	distribution only
June 12, 1956	A Kiss Before Dying	produced by Crown Productions
June 1956	The Black Sleep	produced by Aubrey Schenck
June 1956	Shadow of Fear	
July 1956	Johnny Concho	
July 26, 1956	The Ambassador's Daughter	
July 30, 1956	Run for the Sun	
July 30, 1956	Rebel in Town	produced by Aubrey Schenck
August 1956	The Beast of Hollow Mountain	
August 9, 1956	Huk!	
September 15, 1956	Gun Brothers	produced by Edward Small
September 1956	Bandido	
October 8, 1956	Flight to Hong Kong	produced by Harold Hecht Films and Daiei Motion Picture Company
October 10, 1956	The Boss	
October 17, 1956	Attack	
October 17, 1956	Around the World in 80 Days	Winner of the Academy Award for Best Picture
October 30, 1956	Man from Del Rio	
November 1, 1956	Running Target	
November 2, 1956	Hot Cars	
November 2, 1956	Emergency Hospital	
November 15, 1956	Gun the Man Down	
November 17, 1956	The Sharkfighters	
November 1956	The Peacemaker	
December 12, 1956	The Brass Legend	
December 21, 1956	The Wild Party	
December 21, 1956	The King and Four Queens	
December 22, 1956	Dance With Me, Henry	

=== 1957 ===
Release date	Title	Notes
January 1957	Drango	
January 1957	The Halliday Brand	
January 1957	Four Boys and a Gun	
January 9, 1957	Crime of Passion	
January 26, 1957	Men in War	
January 30, 1957	5 Steps to Danger	
February 1, 1957	Tomahawk Trail	produced by Aubrey Schenck
February 1957	Voodoo Island	produced by Aubrey Schenck
February 1957	Pharaoh's Curse	produced by Aubrey Schenck
March 1957	Revolt at Fort Laramie	produced by Aubrey Schenck
March 1, 1957	The Delinquents	
March 11, 1957	The Big Boodle	
March 15, 1957	Hit and Run	
March 21, 1957	War Drums	produced by Aubrey Schenck
March 28, 1957	The Big Caper	produced by Pine-Thomas Productions
April 1957	The Iron Sheriff	produced by Edward Small
April 10, 1957	The Bachelor Party	produced by Hecht-Hill-Lancaster Productions and Norma Productions
April 13, 1957	12 Angry Men	Nominee of the Academy Award for Best Picture; Inducted into the National Film Registry in 2007
April 19, 1957	Fury at Showdown	
April 29, 1957	The Ride Back	
May 1, 1957	Gun Duel in Durango	
May 4, 1957	Spring Reunion	produced by Bryna Productions
May 8, 1957	Saint Joan	
May 29, 1957	Monkey on My Back	produced by Edward Small
May 1957	Bailout at 43,000	produced by Pine-Thomas Productions
June 30, 1957	Love in the Afternoon	international distribution only; produced by Allied Artists
June 1957	The Vampire	
June 1957	The Monster That Challenged the World	produced by Levy-Gardner-Laven
June 1957	Bayou	
July 4, 1957	Sweet Smell of Success	produced by Hecht-Hill-Lancaster Productions, Norma Productions and Curtleigh Productions; Inducted into the National Film Registry in 1993
July 10, 1957	The Pride and the Passion	produced by Stanley Kramer
July 12, 1957	Trooper Hook	
July 22, 1957	Jungle Heat	produced by Aubrey Schenck
July 1957	The Buckskin Lady	
July 1957	Outlaw's Son	
July 1957	Hidden Fear	
July 1957	Bop Girl Goes Calypso	Produced by Aubrey Schenck
August 1, 1957	Valerie	
August 21, 1957	The Fuzzy Pink Nightgown	
August 30, 1957	Chicago Confidential	produced by Edward Small
August 1957	My Gun Is Quick	
August 1957	Lady of Vengeance	
September 2, 1957	The Careless Years	produced by Bryna Productions and Michael Productions
September 8, 1957	Satchmo the Great	
September 24, 1957	The Girl in Black Stockings	produced by Edward Small
September 1957	Street of Sinners	
September 1957	Gunsight Ridge	
September 1957	Quatermass 2	produced by Hammer Film Productions
October 9, 1957	The Monte Carlo Story	Italian film produced by Titanus; distribution only
October 23, 1957	Time Limit	
October 1957	Hell Bound	
November 1, 1957	Ride Out for Revenge	produced by Bryna Productions
December 1, 1957	Man on the Prowl	
December 11, 1957	Baby Face Nelson	
December 17, 1957	Legend of the Lost	
December 20, 1957	The Dalton Girls	produced by Aubrey Schenck
December 25, 1957	Paths of Glory	produced by Bryna Productions and Harris-Kubrick Pictures; Inducted into the National Film Registry in 1992

=== 1958 ===
Release date	Title	Notes
1958	The Betrayal	
1958	Cross-Up	Produced by Tempean Films, Ltd (UK); US distribution only
January 1, 1958	Gun Fever	
February 1, 1958	Fort Bowie	produced by Aubrey Schenck
February 6, 1958	Witness for the Prosecution	Nominee of the Academy Award for Best Picture
February 8, 1958	The Quiet American	produced by Figaro
February 1958	The Steel Bayonet	
February 1958	Lost Lagoon	
March 27, 1958	Run Silent, Run Deep	produced by Hecht-Hill-Lancaster Productions and Jeffrey Productions
April 2, 1958	The Flame Barrier	
April 1958	The Return of Dracula	
May 9, 1958	Paris Holiday (Note: Co-owned by Sony Pictures (via CPT Holdings, Inc.) and Fremantle)	distribution only; produced by Tolda Productions
May 10, 1958	Thunder Road	
May 14, 1958	Toughest Gun in Tombstone	produced by Edward Small
May 1958	Fort Massacre	produced by Mirisch Company
May 1958	Edge of Fury	
May 1958	Island Women	
June 4, 1958	The Lone Ranger and the Lost City of Gold	
June 28, 1958	The Vikings	produced by Brynaprod and Curtleigh Productions
June 28, 1958	Kings Go Forth	
June 1958	Wink of an Eye	
July 30, 1958	La Parisienne	produced by Les Films Ariane
July 1958	I Bury the Living	
August 13, 1958	God's Little Acre	
August 14, 1958	It! The Terror from Beyond Space	produced by Edward Small
August 14, 1958	Curse of the Faceless Man	produced by Edward Small
September 7, 1958	Terror in a Texas Town	
September 27, 1958	The Defiant Ones	produced by Stanley Kramer Productions, Lomitas Productions and Curtleigh Productions; Nominee of the Academy Award for Best Picture
September 1958	The Gun Runners	
October 1, 1958	Man of the West	produced by Mirisch Company
October 1, 1958	Cop Hater	
October 29, 1958	Ten Days to Tulara	
October 1958	The Fearmakers	
October 1958	The Big Country	
October 1958	Hong Kong Confidential	produced by Edward Small
October 1958	Face in the Night	
November 11, 1958	The Horse's Mouth	
November 18, 1958	I Want to Live!	
November 26, 1958	Anna Lucasta	
November 1958	The Mugger	
December 3, 1958	China Doll	
December 25, 1958	Separate Tables	produced by Hecht-Hill-Lancaster Productions and Clifton Productions Nominee of the Academy Award for Best Picture
December 1958	Lonelyhearts	
December 1958	The Lost Missile	
December 1958	Machete	

=== 1959 ===
Release date	Title	Notes
1959	Mark of the Phoenix	
January 1959	Operation Murder	
January 1959	Guns Girls and Gangsters	produced by Edward Small
January 23, 1959	Escort West	
February 18, 1959	The Last Mile	
March 15, 1959	Mustang!	
March 19, 1959	Some Like It Hot	produced by Mirisch Company; Inaugural inductee of the National Film Registry in 1989
March 20, 1959	Alias Jesse James	
April 1959	Riot in Juvenile Prison	produced by Edward Small
May 15, 1959	Invisible Invaders	produced by Edward Small
May 29, 1959	Pork Chop Hill	
May 1959	The Gunfight at Dodge City	produced by Mirisch Company
June 10, 1959	The Man in the Net	produced by Mirisch Company
June 10, 1959	The Naked Maja	US distribution only; produced by Metro-Goldwyn-Mayer and Titanus
June 19, 1959	The Rabbit Trap	produced by Hecht-Hill-Lancaster Productions, Canon Productions and Anne Productions
June 24, 1959	Shake Hands with the Devil	
July 3, 1959	The Hound of the Baskervilles	distribution only; produced by Hammer Films
July 15, 1959	A Hole in the Head	
July 17, 1959	Ten Seconds to Hell	
July 19, 1959	Day of the Outlaw	
July 1959	The Horse Soldiers	produced by Mirisch Company
August 20, 1959	The Devil's Disciple	produced by Hecht-Hill-Lancaster Films and Brynaprod in the UK
August 1959	Cry Tough	produced by Hecht-Hill-Lancaster Productions, Canon Productions and Anne Productions
September 10, 1959	The Great St. Louis Bank Robbery	
September 1959	Cast a Long Shadow	
September 1959	Inside the Mafia	produced by Edward Small
October 1, 1959	The Wonderful Country	
October 1959	Pier 5, Havana	produced by Edward Small
October 1959	Counterplot	
November 10, 1959	Happy Anniversary	
November 13, 1959	The Four Skulls of Jonathan Drake	produced by Edward Small
November 22, 1959	Timbuktu	produced by Edward Small but had his name removed
November 1959	Odds Against Tomorrow	distribution only, Harbel Productions, Inc.
December 1, 1959	Take a Giant Step	produced by Hecht-Hill-Lancaster Productions and Sheila Productions
December 17, 1959	On the Beach	produced by Stanley Kramer
December 20, 1959	A Dog's Best Friend	produced by Edward Small
December 25, 1959	Solomon and Sheba	produced by Edward Small
December 1959	Vice Raid	produced by Edward Small

== 1960s ==
=== 1960 ===
Release date	Title	Notes
January 1, 1960	And Quiet Flows the Don	
January 1, 1960	Gunfighters of Abilene	produced by Edward Small
February 1960	The Pusher	
March 1960	Oklahoma Territory	produced by Edward Small
March 1960	Three Came to Kill	produced by Edward Small
April 6, 1960	The Unforgiven	produced by Hecht-Hill-Lancaster Productions and James Productions
April 13, 1960	The Boy and the Pirates	produced by Bert I. Gordon
April 14, 1960	The Fugitive Kind	
May 1, 1960	Noose for a Gunman	produced by Edward Small
June 15, 1960	The Apartment	produced by Mirisch Company; Winner of the Academy Award for Best Picture; Inducted into the National Film Registry in 1994
June 22, 1960	The Gallant Hours	
June 27, 1960	The Trials of Oscar Wilde	produced by Warwick Films in the Uk
June 29, 1960	Elmer Gantry	Nominee of the Academy Award for Best Picture
June 1960	The Music Box Kid	produced by Edward Small
June 1960	Macumba Love	
July 17, 1960	The Last Days of Pompeii	Italian film
July 21, 1960	Inherit the Wind	produced by Stanley Kramer
July 1960	Cage of Evil	produced by Edward Small
September 1960	Studs Lonigan	
October 12, 1960	The Magnificent Seven	produced by Mirisch Company; Inducted into the National Film Registry in 2013
October 24, 1960	The Alamo	Nominee of the Academy Award for Best Picture
October 1960	The Walking Target	produced by Edward Small
November 1, 1960	Never on Sunday	Greek film
November 14, 1960	The Facts of Life	distribution only
December 14, 1960	A Terrible Beauty	
December 15, 1960	Exodus	Carlyle-Alpina, S.A.

=== 1961 ===
Release date	Title	Notes
January 7, 1961	Five Guns to Tombstone	produced by Edward Small
February 1, 1961	The Misfits	produced by Seven Arts Productions
February 1961	Police Dog Story	produced by Edward Small
February 1961	Frontier Uprising	produced by Edward Small
March 26, 1961	The Hoodlum Priest	
April 8, 1961	Operation Bottleneck	produced by Edward Small
April 26, 1961	The Snake Woman	produced by Edward Small
April 1961	Minotaur, the Wild Beast of Crete	
May 1, 1961	Gun Fight	produced by Edward Small
May 5, 1961	The Gambler Wore a Gun	produced by Edward Small
May 24, 1961	The Young Savages	produced by Hecht-Hill-Lancaster Productions and Contemporary Productions
May 27, 1961	The Last Time I Saw Archie	
May 31, 1961	A Matter of Morals	
June 10, 1961	When the Clock Strikes	produced by Edward Small
June 28, 1961	The Naked Edge	
June 28, 1961	Three on a Spree	produced by Edward Small
June 29, 1961	Goodbye Again	
June 1961	The Revolt of the Slaves	Italian film
July 10, 1961	Fate of a Man	
July 19, 1961	By Love Possessed	produced by Mirisch Company
July 25, 1961	Mary Had a Little...	produced by Edward Small
July 1961	The Cat Burglar	produced by Edward Small
July 1961	You Have to Run Fast	
August 17, 1961	Teenage Millionaire	
August 23, 1961	The Young Doctors	
September 27, 1961	Paris Blues	
September 1961	The Flight That Disappeared	produced by Edward Small
September 1961	Secret of Deep Harbor	
October 10, 1961	Town Without Pity	produced by Mirisch Company
October 18, 1961	West Side Story	produced by Mirisch Company; Winner of the Academy Award for Best Picture; Inducted into the National Film Registry in 1997
October 1961	Boy Who Caught a Crook	produced by Edward Small
October 1961	The Explosive Generation	
November 5, 1961	Gun Street	
December 15, 1961	One, Two, Three	produced by Mirisch Company
December 16, 1961	Summer of the Seventeenth Doll	produced by Hecht-Hill-Lancaster Productions
December 19, 1961	The Children's Hour	produced by Mirisch Company
December 19, 1961	Judgment at Nuremberg	produced by Stanley Kramer; Nominee of the Academy Award for Best Picture; Inducted into the National Film Registry in 2013
December 20, 1961	The Happy Thieves	
December 22, 1961	X-15	
December 23, 1961	Something Wild	produced by Prometheus Enterprises Inc.
December 25, 1961	Pocketful of Miracles	
December 27, 1961	The Clown and the Kid	produced by Edward Small

=== 1962 ===
Release date	Title	Notes
1962	Court Martial	
January 1962	The Nun and the Sergeant	
February 10, 1962	Sergeants 3	
February 22, 1962	The Magic Sword	co-production with Bert I. Gordon Productions
February 1962	Deadly Duo	produced by Edward Small
February 1962	Saintly Sinners	
April 11, 1962	Follow That Dream	produced by Mirisch Company
April 11, 1962	Ursus	
April 19, 1962	Jessica	
May 1962	War Hunt	
May 1, 1962	Geronimo	produced by Levy-Gardner-Laven
May 15, 1962	Doctor Blood's Coffin	produced by Edward Small
May 16, 1962	Incident in an Alley	
May 22, 1962	The Road to Hong Kong	Produced by Melnor Films in the UK
June 13, 1962	The Valiant	
June 13, 1962	Jack the Giant Killer	produced by Edward Small
June 25, 1962	Animas Trujano	
July 3, 1962	Birdman of Alcatraz	produced by Hecht-Hill-Lancaster Productions and Norma Productions
July 28, 1962	The Miracle Worker	produced by Playfilm Productions; Inducted into the National Film Registry in 2024
August 29, 1962	Kid Galahad	produced by Mirisch Company
September 16, 1962	Hero's Island	
September 1962	Sword of the Conqueror	
October 24, 1962	The Manchurian Candidate	Inducted into the National Film Registry in 1994
October 24, 1962	Eyes Without a Face	French film
October 24, 1962	Tower of London	
October 31, 1962	The Vampire and the Ballerina	
November 24, 1962	Two for the Seesaw	produced by Mirisch Company
December 1, 1962	Electra	
December 2, 1962	Pressure Point	
December 8, 1962	Beauty and the Beast	produced by Edward Small
December 19, 1962	Taras Bulba	produced by Harold Hecht Productions, Curtleigh Productions and Avala Film

=== 1963 ===
Release date	Title	Notes
1963	The Great Van Robbery	
1963	So Evil, So Young	
January 11, 1963	A Child Is Waiting	produced by Stanley Kramer
March 6, 1963	Amazons of Rome	
March 6, 1963	Diary of a Madman	produced by Robert Kent Productions/Admiral Pictures
March 20, 1963	Five Miles to Midnight	
April 24, 1963	Love Is a Ball	
May 8, 1963	Dr. No	produced by Eon Productions
May 15, 1963	I Could Go On Singing	
June 5, 1963	Irma la Douce	produced by Mirisch Company
June 14, 1963	Call Me Bwana	produced by Eon Productions
June 17, 1963	The Mouse on the Moon	Produced by Walter Shenson Films (UK)
July 4, 1963	The Great Escape	produced by Mirisch Company
July 31, 1963	Toys in the Attic	produced by Mirisch Company
August 21, 1963	The Caretakers	produced by Hall Bartlett Productions, Inc.
September 18, 1963	My Son, the Hero	Italian film
September 1963	Twice-Told Tales	produced by Edward Small
October 1, 1963	Lilies of the Field	Nominee of the Academy Award for Best Picture; Inducted into the National Film Registry in 2020
October 2, 1963	Johnny Cool	
October 2, 1963	Stolen Hours	produced by Mirisch Company
October 6, 1963	Tom Jones (Note: Owned by Woodfall Film Productions, with distribution rights currently licensed to the Criterion Collection, Janus Films and Miramax)	produced by Woodfall Films; Winner of the Academy Award for Best Picture
November 7, 1963	It's a Mad, Mad, Mad, Mad World	produced by Stanley Kramer in Ultra Panavision
November 13, 1963	McLintock! (Note: Co-owned by Batjac Productions and SGL Entertainment, with the former licensing distribution rights to Paramount Pictures)	distribution only; produced by Batjac Productions
December 18, 1963	The Ceremony	
December 18, 1963	Kings of the Sun	produced by Mirisch Company
December 23, 1963	Ladybug Ladybug	produced by Francis Productions Inc.

=== 1964 ===
Release date	Title	Notes
March 19, 1964	The World of Henry Orient	produced by Pan Arts Company
March 20, 1964	The Pink Panther	produced by Mirisch Company; Inducted into the National Film Registry in 2010
February 26, 1964	One Man's Way	
March 25, 1964	Flight from Ashiya	
April 5, 1964	The Best Man	
May 27, 1964	From Russia with Love	produced by Eon Productions
June 8, 1964	That Man from Rio	
June 23, 1964	A Shot in the Dark	produced by Mirisch Company
June 24, 1964	633 Squadron	produced by Mirisch Company
June 1964	For Those Who Think Young	
August 11, 1964	A Hard Day's Night (Note: Owned by Bruce and Martha Karsh; currently licensed for distribution in the U.S. to Janus Films and the Criterion Collection)	produced by Walter Shenson Films/Proscenium Films
September 2, 1964	The 7th Dawn	
September 16, 1964	The Secret Invasion	
September 17, 1964	Topkapi	
September 30, 1964	Woman of Straw	
October 14, 1964	Invitation to a Gunfighter	
November 21, 1964	Four Days in November	
December 22, 1964	Kiss Me, Stupid	produced by Mirisch Company

=== 1965 ===
Release date	Title	Notes
January 9, 1965	Goldfinger	produced by Eon Productions
January 26, 1965	How to Murder Your Wife	
February 15, 1965	The Greatest Story Ever Told	
February 19, 1965	Ferry Cross the Mersey	Produced by Subafilms in the UK
March 7, 1965	The Train	Shot in France in English
April 14, 1965	The Satan Bug	produced by Mirisch Company
April 28, 1965	Masquerade	
May 12, 1965	Mister Moses	
June 18, 1965	I'll Take Sweden	produced by Edward Small
June 22, 1965	What's New Pussycat?	Produced by Famous Artists Productions; shot in France
June 23, 1965	The Hallelujah Trail	produced by Mirisch Company
June 30, 1965	The Knack ...and How to Get It	Woodfall Film Productions (UK); distribution only
July 7, 1965	The Glory Guys	produced by Levy-Gardner-Laven
August 25, 1965	Help! (Note: Co-owned by Apple Corps and Bruce and Martha Karsh)	produced by Walter Shenson Films/Subafilms
September 15, 1965	Billie	
October 20, 1965	A Rage to Live	produced by Mirisch Company
November 16, 1965	Return from the Ashes	produced by Mirisch Company
December 13, 1965	A Thousand Clowns	Nominee of the Academy Award for Best Picture
December 18, 1965	Viva Maria!	distribution only
December 22, 1965	Thunderball	produced by Eon Productions

=== 1966 ===
Release date	Title	Notes
February 21, 1966	Lord Love a Duck	
March 4, 1966	The Group	
March 15, 1966	Hamlet	
March 30, 1966	Cast a Giant Shadow	produced by Mirisch Company
March 31, 1966	Frankie and Johnny	produced by Edward Small
May 17, 1966	Up to His Ears	
May 25, 1966	The Russians Are Coming, the Russians Are Coming	produced by Mirisch Company; Nominee of the Academy Award for Best Picture
May 1966	Don't Worry, We'll Think of a Title	
June 8, 1966	Boy, Did I Get a Wrong Number!	
June 15, 1966	Duel at Diablo	
June 15, 1966	Khartoum	distribution only; Julian Blaustein Productions (UK)
August 1, 1966	Mademoiselle	distribution only; Woodfall Film Productions (UK)
August 1, 1966	Namu, the Killer Whale	
August 31, 1966	What Did You Do in the War, Daddy?	produced by Mirisch Company
September 14, 1966	Ambush Bay	produced by Aubrey Schenck
October 10, 1966	Hawaii	produced by Mirisch Company
October 16, 1966	A Funny Thing Happened on the Way to the Forum	
October 19, 1966	The Fortune Cookie	produced by Mirisch Company
October 19, 1966	Return of the Seven	produced by Mirisch Company
October 24, 1966	10:30 P.M. Summer	
December 12, 1966	Thunderbirds Are Go	produced by Century 21 Cinema and Associated Television
December 15, 1966	After the Fox	

=== 1967 ===
Release date	Title	Notes
January 18, 1967	A Fistful of Dollars	distribution only
February 22, 1967	Marat/Sade	
March 9, 1967	How to Succeed in Business Without Really Trying	produced by Mirisch Company
March 16, 1967	Persona	Swedish film directed by Ingmar Bergman
March 1967	Finders Keepers	
April 24, 1967	The Sailor from Gibraltar	
April 26, 1967	Eight on the Lam	
May 10, 1967	For a Few Dollars More	distribution only; produced by Alberto Grimaldi
May 22, 1967	The Honey Pot	
May 24, 1967	The Way West	produced by Harold Hecht Corporation
June 13, 1967	You Only Live Twice	produced by Eon Productions, first use of the United Artists "ovoid" logo
July 31, 1967	The Whisperers	
August 2, 1967	In the Heat of the Night	produced by Mirisch Company; Winner of the Academy Award for Best Picture; Inducted into the National Film Registry in 2002
August 3, 1967	Beach Red	
September 15, 1967	Track of Thunder	
October 23, 1967	How I Won the War	
November 1, 1967	Hour of the Gun	produced by Mirisch Company
November 10, 1967	The Hills Run Red	
November 10, 1967	Matchless	
November 22, 1967	Operation Kid Brother	
December 4, 1967	Clambake	produced by Levy-Gardner-Laven
December 6, 1967	Kill a Dragon	produced by Aubrey Schenck
December 6, 1967	Navajo Joe	
December 18, 1967	Live for Life	distribution only
December 20, 1967	Billion Dollar Brain	produced by Harry Saltzman
December 20, 1967	Fitzwilly	co-production with Mirisch Company
December 29, 1967	The Good, the Bad and the Ugly	

=== 1968 ===
Release date	Title	Notes
January 3, 1968	The Wicked Dreams of Paula Schultz	produced by Edward Small
February 14, 1968	Danger Route	produced by Amicus Productions
April 2, 1968	The Scalphunters	produced by Levy-Gardner-Laven
April 4, 1968	The Party	produced by Mirisch Company
April 24, 1968	Yours, Mine and Ours	produced by Desilu Productions
May 8, 1968	The Private Navy of Sgt. O'Farrell	distribution only; produced by John Beck-Naho Productions
May 15, 1968	The Devil's Brigade	produced by David L. Wolper
June 28, 1968	The World of Hans Christian Andersen	American distribution: produced in Japan by Toei Doga
June 5, 1968	Attack on the Iron Coast	produced by Oakmont Productions
June 19, 1968	The Thomas Crown Affair	produced by Mirisch Company
June 25, 1968	The Bride Wore Black	
July 19, 1968	Inspector Clouseau	produced by Mirisch Company
July 31, 1968	Hang 'Em High	
September 1968	Shock Troops	
September 1968	The Ugly Ones	
September 18, 1968	Salt and Pepper	
October 11, 1968	The Charge of the Light Brigade	
October 14, 1968	Paper Lion	
November 13, 1968	A Quiet Place in the Country	
November 15, 1968	Yellow Submarine (Note: Owned by Apple Corps)	distribution only; produced by King Features Syndicate and Subafilms Ltd
November 20, 1968	Thunderbird 6	produced by Century 21 Cinema and Associated Television
December 13, 1968	The Mercenary	
December 18, 1968	Chitty Chitty Bang Bang	
December 18, 1968	The Night They Raided Minsky's	produced by Tandem Productions
December 1968	Buona Sera, Mrs. Campbell	

=== 1969 ===
Release date	Title	Notes
January 15, 1969	More Dead Than Alive	produced by Aubrey Schenck
January 17, 1969	Fellini's Satyricon	co-produced by Alberto Grimaldi
February 19, 1969	Play Dirty	produced by Harry Saltzman
February 21, 1969	A Twist of Sand	
February 28, 1969	Some Girls Do	
March 26, 1969	Support Your Local Sheriff!	
April 1, 1969	Sam Whiskey	produced by Levy-Gardner-Laven
April 18, 1969	Mississippi Mermaid	
April 25, 1969	If It's Tuesday, This Must Be Belgium	produced by David L. Wolper
April 30, 1969	Hannibal Brooks	
May 7, 1969	Impasse	distribution only
May 7, 1969	Sinful Davey	produced by Mirisch Company
May 7, 1969	Where It's At	
May 27, 1969	Popi	
May 28, 1969	Guns of the Magnificent Seven	produced by Mirisch Company
June 11, 1969	The First Time	produced by Mirisch Company
June 25, 1969	Death Rides a Horse	
July 2, 1969	Sabata	co produced by Alberto Grimaldi
July 30, 1969	Midnight Cowboy	Winner of the Academy Award for Best Picture; Inducted into the National Film Registry in 1994
July 1969	The Thousand Plane Raid	produced by Oakmont Productions
August 20, 1969	Alice's Restaurant	
August 21, 1969	Number One	
August 27, 1969	The Bridge at Remagen	produced by David L. Wolper
August 1969	Submarine X-1	produced by Oakmont Productions
September 28, 1969	The Bed-Sitting Room	
October 1, 1969	Some Kind of a Nut	produced by Mirisch Company
October 2, 1969	The File of the Golden Goose	produced by Edward Small
October 15, 1969	Young Billy Young	
October 24, 1969	Battle of Britain	
October 29, 1969	The Secret of Santa Vittoria	produced by Stanley Kramer
November 25, 1969	Crossplot	
December 2, 1969	The Sex of Angels	
December 16, 1969	Gaily, Gaily	
December 18, 1969	On Her Majesty's Secret Service	produced by Eon Productions
December 21, 1969	The Happy Ending	
December 21, 1969	The Graduate (Note: Owned by StudioCanal)	international distribution only; produced by Embassy Pictures
December 23, 1969	Three	
December 1969	Out of It	

== 1970s ==
=== 1970 ===
Release date	Title	Notes
February 18, 1970	What Do You Say to a Naked Lady?	
March 16, 1970	Love Is a Funny Thing	
March 20, 1970	Hell Boats	produced by Oakmont Productions
March 27, 1970	Pussycat, Pussycat, I Love You	
March 27, 1970	Women in Love	
April 29, 1970	Halls of Anger	produced by Mirisch Company
May 8, 1970	The Last Escape	produced by Oakmont Productions
May 13, 1970	Leo the Last	
May 15, 1970	Let It Be	produced by Apple Films
May 20, 1970	The Landlord	produced by Mirisch Company
May 27, 1970	Cotton Comes to Harlem	
May 27, 1970	The Way We Live Now	
May 28, 1970	The Passion of Anna	
May 1970	One More Time	
June 17, 1970	The Hawaiians	produced by Mirisch Company
June 1970	The Christine Jorgensen Story	produced by Edward Small
July 1, 1970	Mosquito Squadron	produced by Oakmont Productions
July 10, 1970	They Call Me MISTER Tibbs!	produced by Mirisch Company
July 15, 1970	The Revolutionary	
July 28, 1970	The Angel Levine	
August 12, 1970	Pound	
August 21, 1970	Adiós, Sabata	produced by Alberto Grimaldi
September 2, 1970	Barquero	
September 4, 1970	Hornets' Nest	
September 9, 1970	The Wild Child (Note: Co-owned by MGM and mk2 Films)	
September 11, 1970	Kes	distribution only
September 23, 1970	Pieces of Dreams	
September 30, 1970	The Crook	
October 2, 1970	Give Her the Moon	
October 7, 1970	Ned Kelly	
October 7, 1970	Underground	produced by Levy-Gardner-Laven
October 21, 1970	Burn!	produced by Alberto Grimaldi
October 28, 1970	The McKenzie Break	produced by Levy-Gardner-Laven
October 29, 1970	The Private Life of Sherlock Holmes	
October 1970	Cannon for Cordoba	produced by Mirisch Company
November 3, 1970	A.k.a. Cassius Clay	
November 10, 1970	Where's Poppa?	
November 18, 1970	The Adventures of Gerard	
1970	Dougal and the Blue Cat	American distribution only

=== 1971 ===
Release date	Title	Notes
January 1971	The Bridge in the Jungle	
February 17, 1971	The Music Lovers	
February 19, 1971	Cold Turkey	
April 9, 1971	Valdez Is Coming	
April 28, 1971	Bananas	
May 12, 1971	Mrs. Pollifax-Spy	
May 26, 1971	Support Your Local Gunfighter	
June 30, 1971	What's the Matter with Helen?	
July 14, 1971	The Hunting Party	produced by Levy-Gardner-Laven
July 21, 1971	Wake in Fright (Note: Owned by Umbrella Entertainment)	distribution only, produced by NLT Productions and Group W Films
July 28, 1971	Von Richthofen and Brown	
August 1, 1971	Doc	
August 4, 1971	Lawman	
September 1, 1971	Return of Sabata	produced by Alberto Grimaldi
September 8, 1971	Sunday Bloody Sunday	
September 22, 1971	Lady Liberty	produced by Compagnia Cinematografica Champion and Les Films Concordia
October 20, 1971	The Organization	produced by Mirisch Company
November 3, 1971	Fiddler on the Roof	produced by Mirisch Company; Nominee for the Academy Award for Best Picture
November 10, 1971	200 Motels	
November 10, 1971	Jennifer on My Mind	
December 1, 1971	Born to Win	
December 12, 1971	The Decameron	co-produced by Alberto Grimaldi
December 14, 1971	The Hospital	Inducted into the National Film Registry in 1995
December 17, 1971	Diamonds Are Forever	produced by Eon Productions

=== 1972 ===
Release date	Title	Notes
February 2, 1972	The Visitors	
May 12, 1972	Chato's Land	
May 17, 1972	The Honkers	
June 30, 1972	Duck, You Sucker!	
July 14, 1972	Fuzz	
July 21, 1972	Pulp	
August 1, 1972	The Magnificent Seven Ride!	produced by Mirisch Company
August 4, 1972	Everything You Always Wanted to Know About Sex* (*But Were Afraid to Ask)	
August 30, 1972	Money Talks	
September 6, 1972	The Mechanic	
September 8, 1972	Man of the East	produced by Alberto Grimaldi
September 20, 1972	Hammer	
October 4, 1972	Hickey & Boggs	
October 15, 1972	Roma	
October 20, 1972	Last Tango in Paris	co-produced by Alberto Grimaldi
November 1, 1972	Superbeast	
November 17, 1972	Daughters of Satan	
December 13, 1972	Man of La Mancha	produced by Alberto Grimaldi
December 15, 1972	Avanti!	
December 20, 1972	Across 110th Street	

=== 1973 ===
Release date	Title	Notes
January 1973	Adolf Hitler: My Part in His Downfall	
January 1973	The Outside Man	
February 11, 1973	Lady Caroline Lamb	
February 16, 1973	The Long Goodbye	Inducted into the National Film Registry in 2021
March 14, 1973	Tom Sawyer	
April 20, 1973	Scorpio	produced by Mirisch Company
May 10, 1973	The Offence	
June 8, 1973	Theatre of Blood	
June 27, 1973	Live and Let Die	produced by Eon Productions
August 3, 1973	Jeremy	
August 24, 1973	Cops and Robbers	
August 29, 1973	White Lightning	produced by Levy-Gardner-Laven
September 14, 1973	I Escaped from Devil's Island	
September 21, 1973	The Spook Who Sat by the Door (Note: Owned by its director Ivan Dixon and writer Sam Greenlee)	Inducted into the National Film Registry in 2012
September 26, 1973	Harry in Your Pocket	
October 26, 1973	Five on the Black Hand Side	
November 14, 1973	The Heroes	

=== 1974 ===
Release date	Title	Notes
February 13, 1974	Thieves Like Us	
February 27, 1974	Busting	
March 15, 1974	Visit to a Chief's Son	
March 20, 1974	Billy Two Hats	
March 20, 1974	The Super Cops	North American theatrical distribution only; produced by Metro-Goldwyn-Mayer
May 1, 1974	The Spikes Gang	co-produced by Mirisch Company
May 8, 1974	Kazablan	North American theatrical co-distribution with Metro-Goldwyn-Mayer only
May 10, 1974	Electra Glide in Blue	
May 17, 1974	Thunderbolt and Lightfoot	
May 17, 1974	That's Entertainment!	North American theatrical distribution only; produced by Metro-Goldwyn-Mayer
May 24, 1974	Huckleberry Finn	
June 7, 1974	Where the Lilies Bloom	
June 26, 1974	Sleeper	
July 17, 1974	Mr. Majestyk	produced by Mirisch Company
July 31, 1974	Bank Shot	
August 14, 1974	Bring Me the Head of Alfredo Garcia	
August 30, 1974	Amazing Grace	
September 20, 1974	Nightmare Honeymoon	North American theatrical distribution only; produced by Metro-Goldwyn-Mayer
September 25, 1974	Juggernaut	
October 2, 1974	The Taking of Pelham 123	
October 18, 1974	Mixed Company	
October 25, 1974	The Voyage	
November 8, 1974	Lenny	Nominee for the Academy Award for Best Picture
December 4, 1974	Soft Beds, Hard Battles	North American theatrical distribution only; produced by The Rank Organisation
December 20, 1974	The Man with the Golden Gun	produced by Eon Productions

=== 1975 ===
Release date	Title	Notes
January 29, 1975	Mr. Ricco	North American theatrical distribution only; produced by Metro-Goldwyn-Mayer
February 5, 1975	Report to the Commissioner	
March 14, 1975	Rancho Deluxe	
March 24, 1975	Rosebud	
March 26, 1975	Brannigan	
March 26, 1975	The Manchu Eagle Murder Caper Mystery	
April 9, 1975	The Passenger (Note: Owned by Sony Pictures (under Sony Pictures Classics))	North American theatrical distribution only; produced by Metro-Goldwyn-Mayer
April 18, 1975	Sharks' Treasure	
May 14, 1975	Moonrunners	
May 21, 1975	The Return of the Pink Panther (Note: Co-owned by MGM and ITV Studios; some rights, including home video, are currently licensed by ITV to Universal Pictures and Focus Features)	theatrical distribution only; produced by ITC Entertainment
May 22, 1975	The Wind and the Lion	North American theatrical distribution only; produced by Metro-Goldwyn-Mayer
June 10, 1975	Love and Death	
June 20, 1975	The Silent Stranger	North American theatrical distribution only; produced by Metro-Goldwyn-Mayer
June 25, 1975	Rollerball	
June 1975	That's the Way of the World	theatrical distribution only; produced by Sig Shore Productions
July 9, 1975	Smile	
July 30, 1975	The Wilby Conspiracy	
August 29, 1975	92 in the Shade	North American theatrical distribution only; produced by ITC Entertainment
October 8, 1975	Hearts of the West	North American theatrical distribution only; produced by Metro-Goldwyn-Mayer
October 10, 1975	Shhh	
November 6, 1975	The Sunshine Boys	North American theatrical distribution only; produced by Metro-Goldwyn-Mayer
November 21, 1975	One Flew Over The Cuckoo's Nest (Note: Owned by Teatro della Pace Films, with certain distribution rights currently licensed to Warner Bros.)	theatrical distribution only; produced by Fantasy Films; Winner of the Academy Award for Best Picture; Inducted into the National Film Registry in 1993
December 19, 1975	Bugs Bunny: Superstar	distribution only; produced by Hare-Raising Films
December 19, 1975	The Killer Elite	

=== 1976 ===
Release date	Title	Notes
January 10, 1976	Salò, or the 120 Days of Sodom	distribution only; produced by Produzioni Europee Associati
February 13, 1976	Inserts	
March 10, 1976	Breakheart Pass	
April 23, 1976	Stay Hungry	
April 1976	It's Showtime	
May 16, 1976	That's Entertainment, Part II	North American theatrical distribution only; produced by Metro-Goldwyn-Mayer
May 19, 1976	The Missouri Breaks	
May 20, 1976	Trackdown	
June 23, 1976	Logan's Run	North American theatrical distribution only; produced by Metro-Goldwyn-Mayer
June 24, 1976	Buffalo Bill and the Indians, or Sitting Bull's History Lesson	North American distribution only; produced by Dino De Laurentiis Company, Lion's Gate Films, and Talent Associates-Norton Simon
July 30, 1976	Drum	North American distribution only; produced by Dino De Laurentiis Company
June 1976	Sweet Revenge	North American theatrical distribution only; produced by Metro-Goldwyn-Mayer
August 4, 1976	The Return of a Man Called Horse	
August 25, 1976	Gator	produced by Levy-Gardner-Laven
August 27, 1976	From Noon till Three	
September 1, 1976	Novecento (1900)	Select international distribution only; produced by Produzioni Europee Associati
September 8, 1976	Vigilante Force	
September 29, 1976	Norman... Is That You?	North American theatrical distribution only; produced by Metro-Goldwyn-Mayer
October 20, 1976	Burnt Offerings	produced by Produzioni Europee Associati
November 5, 1976	Carrie	Inducted into the National Film Registry in 2022
November 12, 1976	Karate Bullfighter	
November 27, 1976	Network (Note: Owned by Warner Bros. (via Turner Entertainment Co.) in the United States and Canada and retained by MGM internationally)	co-production with Metro-Goldwyn-Mayer; Nominee for the Academy Award for Best Picture; Inducted into the National Film Registry in 2000
December 3, 1976	Rocky	Winner of the Academy Award for Best Picture; Inducted into the National Film Registry in 2006
December 5, 1976	Bound for Glory	Nominee for the Academy Award for Best Picture
December 17, 1976	The Pink Panther Strikes Again	

=== 1977 ===
Release date	Title	Notes
March 10, 1977	Welcome to L.A.	
April 1, 1977	Demon Seed	North American theatrical distribution only; produced by Metro-Goldwyn-Mayer
April 6, 1977	Audrey Rose	
April 20, 1977	Annie Hall	Winner of the Academy Award for Best Picture; Inducted into the National Film Registry in 1992
May 5, 1977	The Solid Gold Show	
May 6, 1977	The White Buffalo (Note: MGM now owns worldwide rights to The White Buffalo, having acquired PolyGram Filmed Entertainment's pre-1996 library that included the catalog of Dino de Laurentiis Corporation, the international rights holder of the film)	North American distribution only; produced by Dino De Laurentiis Corporation
June 13, 1977 (Note: Premiered in Boston, wide release on June 15, 1977.)	A Bridge Too Far	
June 7, 1977 (Note: Premiered in New York, wide release on June 21, 1977.)	New York, New York	
August 3, 1977 (Note: Released in British theaters on July 8, 1977.)	The Spy Who Loved Me	produced by Eon Productions
August 12, 1977	Kingdom of the Spiders	select international distribution only; produced by Arachnid Productions; distributed in the U.S. by Dimension Pictures
October 1, 1977 (Note: Released in French theaters on April 27, 1977.)	The Man Who Loved Women	French film; distribution only; distributed in the U.S. by Cinema 5
October 5, 1977 (Note: Released in international theaters on September 7, 1977.)	Valentino	co-production with Chartoff-Winkler Productions
October 14, 1977 (Note: Released in British theaters on March 31, 1977.)	Joseph Andrews	British film; international distribution only; produced by Woodfall Film Productions; distributed in North America by Paramount Pictures
October 16, 1977	Equus	
November 18, 1977	Semi-Tough	
November 20, 1977	Iphigenia	distribution outside Greece, Cyprus and Italy only; distributed in the U.S. by Cinema 5
November 23, 1977 (Note: Released in French and West German theaters on September 28 and October 28, 1977, respectively.)	Another Man, Another Chance	
December 16, 1977	Telefon	North American theatrical distribution only; produced by Metro-Goldwyn-Mayer

=== 1978 ===
Release date	Title	Notes
January 6, 1978	Coma	North American theatrical distribution only; produced by Metro-Goldwyn-Mayer
January 13, 1978	Golden Rendezvous	
February 9, 1978	The Betsy	international distribution only; produced by Harold Robbins International; distributed worldwide by Allied Artists
February 15, 1978	Coming Home	Nominee for the Academy Award for Best Picture
February 1978	Three Warriors	U.S. theatrical distribution only; produced by Fantasy Films
March 13, 1978	The Big Sleep	North American theatrical distribution only; produced by ITC Entertainment
April 26, 1978	F.I.S.T.	
April 26, 1978	The Last Waltz	Inducted into the National Film Registry in 2019
May 10, 1978	The End	
June 2, 1978	Corvette Summer	North American theatrical distribution only; produced by Metro-Goldwyn-Mayer
June 14, 1978	Go Tell the Spartans	international distribution only; produced by Spartan Productions and MarVista Productions; distributed in North America by AVCO Embassy Pictures
June 28, 1978	Convoy (Note: Co-owned by MGM and StudioCanal)	North American distribution only; produced by EMI Films
July 19, 1978	Revenge of the Pink Panther (Note: Released in British theaters on July 13, 1978.)	co-production with Jewel Productions
July 19, 1978	International Velvet	North American theatrical distribution only; produced by Metro-Goldwyn-Mayer
August 2, 1978	Interiors	
August 2, 1978	Who'll Stop the Rain	
August 3, 1978	Piranha	international distribution only; produced by New World Pictures
October 25, 1978	Comes a Horseman	co-production with Chartoff-Winkler Productions
October 30, 1978	Message from Space	North American distribution only; produced by Toei Company and Tohokushinsha Film
November 8, 1978	Slow Dancing in the Big City	co-production with CIP Filmproduktion
November 15, 1978	The Lord of the Rings	theatrical distribution only; produced by Fantasy Films
December 8, 1978	The Deer Hunter	theatrical distribution in Latin America, France, West Germany, Spain and Japan only; produced by EMI Films
December 15, 1978	Uncle Joe Shannon	co-production with Chartoff-Winkler Productions
December 22, 1978	Invasion of the Body Snatchers	co-production with the Solofilm Company
December 22, 1978	Brass Target	North American theatrical distribution only; produced by Metro-Goldwyn-Mayer

=== 1979 ===
Release date	Title	Notes
February 2, 1979 (Note: Released in British theaters on December 14, 1978.)	The First Great Train Robbery	British film; distribution only; produced by Dino De Laurentiis Corporation and Starling Productions
March 9, 1979	The Passage (Note: MGM now owns the rights to The Passage, having acquired PolyGram Filmed Entertainment's pre-1996 library that included the catalog of Hemdale Film Corporation)	North American theatrical distribution only; produced by Hemdale and Passage Films, Inc.
March 14, 1979	Hair	co-production with CIP Filmproduktion
March 14, 1979	Voices	North American theatrical distribution only; produced by Metro-Goldwyn-Mayer
March 22, 1979	The Visitor	select international distribution only
April 4, 1979	The Champ	North American theatrical distribution only; produced by Metro-Goldwyn-Mayer
April 15, 1979	Fedora	North American theatrical distribution only
April 18, 1979 (Note: Premiered in New York City, wide release on April 25, 1979.)	Manhattan	Inducted into the National Film Registry in 2001
May 3, 1979	The Tin Drum	U.K., Irish, West German, Italian and Scandinavian theatrical distribution only
May 4, 1979	Last Embrace	
May 13, 1979 (Note: Released in international theaters on October 20, 1978.)	La Cage aux Folles	French/Italian film
May 25, 1979	Wanda Nevada	distribution only; produced by Paradise Productions
June 14, 1979 (Note: Premiered in Philadelphia, wide release on June 15, 1979.)	Rocky II	co-production with Chartoff-Winkler Productions
June 29, 1979 (Note: Released in British theaters on June 27, 1979.)	Moonraker	produced by Eon Productions
June 1979	Crime Busters	U.S. theatrical distribution only
August 10, 1979	Americathon	North American theatrical distribution only; produced by Lorimar
August 15, 1979	Apocalypse Now (Note: Owned by American Zoetrope, with distribution rights licensed to Lionsgate)	North American and Indian theatrical distribution only; produced by Omni Zoetrope (uncredited); Nominee for the Academy Award for Best Picture; Inducted into the National Film Registry in 2000
August 17, 1979	Rich Kids	co-production with Lion's Gate Films
September 19, 1979	Yanks	international distribution only; produced by CIP Filmproduktion; distributed in North America by Universal Pictures
October 18, 1979 (Note: Premiered in the New York Film Festival on October 13, 1979.)	The Black Stallion	distribution only; produced by Zoetrope Studios; Inducted into the National Film Registry in 2002
October 19, 1979	Head Over Heels	co-production with Triple Play Productions re-released by United Artists Classics under the new title Chilly Scenes of Winter in 1982
November 6, 1979	The Fish That Saved Pittsburgh	North American theatrical distribution only; produced by Lorimar
December 18, 1979	The Human Factor	North American theatrical co-distribution with Metro-Goldwyn-Mayer only
December 19, 1979	Roller Boogie	North American distribution only; produced by Compass International Pictures
December 20, 1979	Being There	North American theatrical distribution only; produced by Lorimar; Inducted into the National Film Registry in 2015
December 21, 1979	Cuba	

== 1980s ==
=== 1980 ===
Release date	Title	Notes
January 18, 1980	Windows	co-production with Michael Lobell Productions
February 8, 1980	Hero at Large	North American theatrical distribution only; produced by Metro-Goldwyn-Mayer
February 15, 1980	Cruising	North American theatrical distribution only; produced by Lorimar Productions and CiP-Europaische Treuhand
February 29, 1980	Foxes	distribution only; produced by PolyGram Pictures
March 12, 1980	A Small Circle of Friends	—
March 21, 1980	Hide in Plain Sight	North American theatrical distribution only; produced by Metro-Goldwyn-Mayer
March 30, 1980 (Note: Released in Italian theaters on September 16, 1972.)	The Canterbury Tales	Italian film; distribution only; produced by Produzioni Europee Associati and Les Productions Artistes Associés; co-distributed in the U.S. by Aidart Distributors
April 25, 1980	Leo and Loree	North American distribution only; produced by Major H Productions
May 2, 1980	Happy Birthday, Gemini	distribution only; produced by King-Hitzig Productions
May 16, 1980	The Long Riders	co-production with Huka Films
May 16, 1980	Fame	North American theatrical distribution only; produced by Metro-Goldwyn-Mayer; Inducted into the National Film Registry in 2023
May 16, 1980	Humanoids from the Deep	international distribution only; produced by New World Pictures
June 13, 1980	Roadie	co-production with Alive Enterprises
June 13, 1980	Carny	North American theatrical distribution only; produced by Lorimar Productions
July 18, 1980	The Big Red One	North American theatrical distribution only; produced by Lorimar Productions
July 27, 1980 (Note: Released in Italian theaters on June 20, 1974.)	Arabian Nights	Italian film; distribution only; produced by Produzioni Europee Associati and Les Productions Artistes Associés; co-distributed under United Artists Classics with Aidart Distributors in the U.S.
August 1, 1980	The Final Countdown	North American theatrical, U.K., Irish, Australian and New Zealand distribution only; produced by the Bryna Company, Aspen Productions, Polyc International and Film Finance Group
August 8, 1980	Why Would I Lie?	North American theatrical distribution only; produced by Metro-Goldwyn-Mayer
August 15, 1980	Those Lips, Those Eyes	co-production with Herb Jaffe Productions
August 29, 1980	He Knows You're Alone	North American theatrical co-distribution with Metro-Goldwyn-Mayer only
September 26, 1980	Stardust Memories	—
October 24, 1980	Motel Hell	co-production with Camp Hill Productions
November 14, 1980	Raging Bull	co-production with Chartoff-Winkler Productions; Nominee for the Academy Award for Best Picture; Inducted into the National Film Registry in 1990
November 14, 1980	The Idolmaker	co-production with Koch/Kirkwood Productions
November 19, 1980	Heaven's Gate	co-production with Partisan Productions
December 19, 1980	The Formula	North American theatrical distribution only; produced by Metro-Goldwyn-Mayer

=== 1981 ===
Release date	Title	Notes
February 13, 1981	The Dogs of War (Note: Released in international theaters on December 18, 1980.)	—
February 13, 1981	Charlie Chan and the Curse of the Dragon Queen (Note: MGM now owns worldwide rights to this film, as a result of acquiring the American Cinema Productions library in 2019)	international distribution only; produced by American Cinema Productions
February 15, 1981 (Note: Released in international theaters on December 10, 1980.)	La Cage aux Folles II	French-Italian film; distribution only
February 27, 1981	Sunday Lovers	North American theatrical co-distribution with Metro-Goldwyn-Mayer only
March 20, 1981	Cutter's Way	distribution only; produced by Gurian Entertainment; released under United Artists Classics in North America
March 27, 1981	Thief	—
April 10, 1981	Knightriders	international distribution only; produced by Laurel Entertainment; distributed in North America by United Film Distribution Company
April 17, 1981	Caveman	co-production with the Turman-Foster Company
May 1, 1981	Savage Harvest (Note: Released in Japanese theaters on April 25, 1981.)	international distribution only; produced by Dysan International; distributed in North America by 20th Century Fox
May 15, 1981 (Note: Released in French theaters on October 1, 1976.)	Second Chance	French film; distribution only; produced by Les Films 13; released under United Artists Classics in North America
June 12, 1981	Clash of the Titans	North American theatrical distribution only; produced by Metro-Goldwyn-Mayer
June 26, 1981	For Your Eyes Only (Note: Released in British theaters on June 24, 1981.)	produced by Eon Productions
June 26, 1981	Force: Five	international distribution only; produced by American Cinema Productions
July 24, 1981	Eye of the Needle	British film; co-production with Kings Road Productions
July 24, 1981	Tarzan the Ape Man	North American theatrical distribution only; produced by Metro-Goldwyn-Mayer
August 14, 1981	Deadly Blessing	North American theatrical distribution only; produced by PolyGram Pictures and Inter Planetary
September 4, 1981	Galaxy of Terror	international distribution only; produced by New World Pictures
September 18, 1981	The French Lieutenant's Woman	British film
September 25, 1981	True Confessions	co-production with Chartoff-Winkler Productions
October 9, 1981	Rich and Famous	North American theatrical distribution only; produced by Metro-Goldwyn-Mayer
October 16, 1981	...All the Marbles	North American theatrical distribution only; produced by Metro-Goldwyn-Mayer
December 2, 1981	Whose Life Is It Anyway?	North American theatrical distribution only; produced by Metro-Goldwyn-Mayer
December 11, 1981	Buddy Buddy	North American theatrical distribution only; produced by Metro-Goldwyn-Mayer
December 11, 1981	Pennies from Heaven	North American theatrical distribution only; produced by Metro-Goldwyn-Mayer

=== 1982 ===
Release date	Title	Notes
January 15, 1982 (Note: Released in West German theaters on July 24, 1981.)	Jaws of Satan	—
January 22, 1982	A Stranger Is Watching	North American theatrical distribution only; produced by Metro-Goldwyn-Mayer
February 11, 1982 (Note: Released in West German theaters on October 15, 1981.)	Circle of Deceit	French-German film; distribution only; released under United Artists Classics in North America
February 12, 1982	The Beast Within	—
February 19, 1982	Swamp Thing	international distribution only; produced by Embassy Pictures
April 2, 1982	Penitentiary II (Note: Owned by Xenon Pictures)	North American distribution only; produced by Bob-Bea Productions
April 2, 1982	Pandemonium	co-production with Krost/Chapin Productions and TMC Developments
April 23, 1982	National Lampoon's Movie Madness	—
May 14, 1982	The House Where Evil Dwells	—
May 28, 1982	Rocky III	co-production with Chartoff-Winkler Productions
May 1982	Safari 3000	—
June 18, 1982 (Note: Released in West German theaters on April 25, 1980.)	Fabian	German film; distribution only; released under United Artists Classics in North America
July 2, 1982	The Secret of NIMH	distribution only; produced by Aurora Productions and Don Bluth Productions
October 22, 1982	Jinxed!	—
November 19, 1982	Still of the Night	—
December 17, 1982 (Note: Released in Australian theaters on December 2, 1982.)	Trail of the Pink Panther	co-production with Blake Edwards Entertainment, Titan Productions, Lakeline Productions and Amjo Productions

=== 1983 ===
Release date	Title	Notes
February 13, 1983	Twilight Time	produced by Centar Film and Dan Tana Productions; released under the Metro-Goldwyn-Mayer name
March 25, 1983	The Black Stallion Returns	distribution only; produced by Zoetrope Studios
April 15, 1983	Rock & Rule (Note: Owned by Nelvana)	U.S. distribution only; produced by Nelvana
April 22, 1983	Exposed	—
June 3, 1983	WarGames	co-production with Sherwood Productions
June 10, 1983 (Note: Released in British theaters on June 7, 1983.)	Octopussy	produced by Eon Productions
August 12, 1983	Curse of the Pink Panther	co-production with Jewel Productions, Titan Productions and Blake Edwards Entertainment
September 16, 1983	The Final Option	North American distribution only
October 7, 1983	Romantic Comedy	co-production with Taft Entertainment Pictures and the Mirisch Corporation
November 18, 1983	Yentl	co-production with Ladbroke Entertainments and Barwood Films

=== 1984 ===
Release date	Title	Notes
January 13, 1984	Hot Dog…The Movie (Note: Owned by Synapse Films)	North American distribution only
May 11, 1984 (Note: Released in international theaters on March 28, 1983.)	Gabriella	Brazilian film; released under MGM/UA Classics in North America
June 22, 1984	The Pope of Greenwich Village	co-production with Koch/Kirkwood Productions
August 10, 1984	Red Dawn	—
September 21, 1984	Until September	—
October 5, 1984	Teachers	—
October 5, 1984	Eureka (Note: Released in international theaters on May 20, 1983.)	distribution only; produced by J.F. Productions and Recorded Picture Company; released under MGM/UA Classics in North America
October 12, 1984	Garbo Talks	—

=== 1985 ===
Release date	Title	Notes
February 22, 1985	Martin's Day	co-production with World Film Services
March 1, 1985	The Aviator	co-production with Mace Neufeld Productions
May 3, 1985	Movers & Shakers	—
May 24, 1985	A View to a Kill	produced by Eon Productions
November 1, 1985	To Live and Die in L.A.	distribution only; produced by New Century Productions and SLM Productions
November 27, 1985	Rocky IV	co-production with Chartoff-Winkler Productions

=== 1986–87 ===
Release date	Title	Notes
January 31, 1986	Youngblood	co-production with the Guber-Peters Company
June 5, 1987	Windrider	North American distribution only; produced by Barron Films
July 31, 1987 (Note: Released in international theaters on June 30, 1987.)	The Living Daylights	produced by Eon Productions
September 25, 1987	Real Men	—
September 25, 1987	You Talkin' to Me?	—
October 7, 1987	Baby Boom	—

=== 1988 ===
Release date	Title	Notes
January 29, 1988	Born to Race	U.S. distribution only
April 1, 1988	Bright Lights, Big City	co-production with Mirage Enterprises
May 13, 1988	Illegally Yours	North American distribution only
May 20, 1988	Rikky and Pete	Australian film; co-production with Cascade Films and Film Victoria
July 13, 1988	It Takes Two	—
August 26, 1988	Betrayed	co-production with Sundown Productions
October 14, 1988	Pumpkinhead	North American distribution only; produced by Lion Films
November 9, 1988	Child's Play	—
December 16, 1988	I'm Gonna Git You Sucka	co-production with Ivory Ray and Raymond Katz Enterprises
December 16, 1988	Rain Man	Winner of the Academy Award for Best Picture co-production with the Guber-Peters Company

=== 1989 ===
Release date	Title	Notes
April 28, 1989	The Horror Show	U.S. distribution only; produced by Sean S. Cunningham Films
May 12, 1989	Night Visitor	North American distribution only; produced by Premiere Pictures Corporation
May 12, 1989	The Rachel Papers	North American distribution only; produced by Initial Productions and Longfellow Pictures
May 12, 1989	Season of Fear	U.S. distribution only
May 12, 1989	Buying Time	U.S. distribution only
May 19, 1989	Road House	co-production with Silver Pictures
July 14, 1989 (Note: Released in international theaters on June 14, 1989.)	Licence to Kill	produced by Eon Productions
August 25, 1989	Little Monsters (Note: Owned by Lionsgate)	North American distribution only; produced by Vestron Pictures, Davis Entertainment Company and Licht/Mueller Film Corporation
September 8, 1989	The Runnin' Kind	—
September 15, 1989	True Love	North American distribution only; produced by Forward Films
October 13, 1989	Damned River	U.S. distribution only; produced by Silver Lion Films
November 17, 1989	All Dogs Go to Heaven	North American distribution only; produced by Goldcrest Films and Sullivan Bluth Studios
December 22, 1989	Always	studio credit only; produced by Universal Pictures and Amblin Entertainment

== 1990s ==
Release date	Title	Notes
April 20, 1990	Lisa	co-production with Surreal Productions
November 16, 1990	Rocky V	co-production with Chartoff-Winkler Productions
August 27, 1993	Son of the Pink Panther	distribution outside Italy only; co-production with Filmauro
September 23, 1994	Sleep with Me	North American distribution only; produced by August Entertainment, Paribas Film Corporation and Revolution Films
March 31, 1995	Tank Girl	co-production with Trilogy Entertainment Group
April 7, 1995	Rob Roy	co-production with Tailsman Films
August 25, 1995	Lord of Illusions	co-production with Seraphim Productions
September 15, 1995	Hackers	—
September 22, 1995	Showgirls	North American distribution only; produced by Chargeurs and Carolco Pictures
October 27, 1995	Leaving Las Vegas	North American distribution only; produced by Lumiere Pictures
November 17, 1995	GoldenEye	produced by Eon Productions
December 1, 1995	Wild Bill	co-production with the Zanuck Company
December 29, 1995	Richard III	U.S. and English-speaking Canadian distribution only; produced by Bayly/Paré Productions
March 8, 1996	The Birdcage	—
March 22, 1996	It's My Party	co-production with Opala Productions
March 29, 1996	A Family Thing	co-production with Butcher's Run Films
November 1, 1996	Larger than Life	North American and Spanish distribution only; co-production with Trilogy Entertainment Group, RCS and Majestic Pictures
November 8, 1996	Mad Dog Time	North American distribution only; produced by Skylight Films; Also known as Trigger Happy
February 14, 1997	Touch	North American distribution only; produced by Lumiere International
August 27, 1997	Hoodlum	—
December 19, 1997 (Note: Released in international theaters on December 12, 1997.)	Tomorrow Never Dies	produced by Eon Productions
February 13, 1998	Hurricane Streets	North American distribution only
March 13, 1998	The Man in the Iron Mask	—
September 25, 1998	Ronin	co-production with FGM Entertainment
February 26, 1999	Just the Ticket	U.S. distribution only; produced by CineSon Productions
March 12, 1999	The Rage: Carrie 2	co-production with Red Bank Films
August 6, 1999	The Thomas Crown Affair	co-production with Irish DreamTime
November 12, 1999	Ratcatcher	originally Goldwyn/G2 Films; international distribution outside the U.K. and Ireland only
November 19, 1999	The World Is Not Enough	copyright holder only; produced by Metro-Goldwyn-Mayer and Eon Productions
November 24, 1999	Flawless	originally Goldwyn/G2 Films; international distribution outside Latin America and Asia excluding Korea only; produced by Metro-Goldwyn-Mayer and Tribeca Productions
December 10, 1999	Miss Julie	distribution in North and Hispanic America, the U.K., Ireland, Australia, New Zealand, Hungary, Romania, the Czech Republic, Slovakia, Bulgaria, former Yugoslavia and the Far East only; produced by Moonstone Entertainment and Red Mullet Productions
December 15, 1999	Topsy-Turvy	originally Goldwyn/G2 Films; international distribution outside the U.K., Ireland, Australia and New Zealand only; produced by Thin Man Films

== 2000s ==
Release date	Title	Notes
January 22, 2000	Things You Can Tell Just by Looking at Her (Note: Distribution rights co-owned by Resurgence Media Group)	North American distribution only; produced by Franchise Pictures; released on Showtime
March 17, 2000	Soft Fruit	international distribution outside the U.K., Ireland, Australia, New Zealand and South Africa only
March 24, 2000	Mr. Accident	distribution only
May 19, 2000	The Virgin Suicides	originally Goldwyn/G2 Films; international distribution outside Europe and Japan only; produced by American Zoetrope, Muse Productions and Eternity Pictures
September 15, 2000 (Note: Released in Italian theaters on August 25, 2000.)	Crime and Punishment in Suburbia	distribution only; produced by Killer Films
September 22, 2000	The Fantasticks	filmed in 1995; release suspended for five years due to lackluster reception; cut down to 86 minutes and shown in four theaters
September 29, 2000	Girlfight	international distribution outside the U.K. and Ireland only; produced by Independent Film Channel Productions and Green/Renzi Productions
April 20, 2001	The Claim	distribution outside Canada, the U.K., Ireland and France only; produced by Pathé Pictures, Le Studio Canal+, BBC Films, Alliance Atlantis, Revolution Films, DB Entertainment and Grosvenor Park Productions
June 15, 2001	Songcatcher	international distribution only
July 20, 2001	Ghost World	North American distribution only; co-production with Granada Film, Jersey Shore and Mr. Mudd
August 31, 2001	Jeepers Creepers	North American distribution only; produced by American Zoetrope
September 28, 2001 (Note: Released in British theaters on March 9, 2001.)	Born Romantic	distribution outside Italy only; produced by BBC Films, Harvest Pictures and the Kismet Film Company
December 7, 2001	No Man's Land	North American distribution only Winner of the Academy Award for Best Foreign Language Film
March 29, 2002	No Such Thing	North American distribution only; produced by American Zoetrope and True Fiction Pictures
May 3, 2002	Deuces Wild	North American distribution only; produced by Unity Productions, Presto Productions and the Antonia Company
May 24, 2002	CQ	North American distribution only; produced by American Zoetrope
June 28, 2002	Pumpkin	North American distribution only; produced by American Zoetrope
August 9, 2002	24 Hour Party People	North and Latin American distribution only; produced by FilmFour, Revolution Films and Baby Cow Films
September 13, 2002	Igby Goes Down	distribution only; produced by Atlantic Streamline and Crossroads Films
October 11, 2002	Bowling for Columbine	U.S. distribution only; produced by Alliance Atlantis, Salter Street Films and Dog Eat Dog Films; Winner of the Academy Award for Best Documentary Feature
October 25, 2002	All or Nothing (Note: Co-owned by Severin Films)	North and Latin American, Australian and New Zealand distribution only; produced by StudioCanal and Thin Man Films
November 22, 2002	Die Another Day	copyright holder only; produced by Metro-Goldwyn-Mayer and Eon Productions
November 22, 2002	Personal Velocity: Three Portraits	distribution in North and Latin America, the U.K., Ireland, Australia and New Zealand only; produced by IFC Productions, InDigEnt Productions and Goldheart/Blue Magic Pictures
December 13, 2002	Evelyn	North American distribution only; produced by Irish DreamTime
December 27, 2002	Nicholas Nickleby	co-production with Hart-Sharp Entertainment and Potboiler Productions
February 21, 2003	Dark Blue	North American, Australian and New Zealand distribution only; produced by Intermedia Films, Alphaville Films and Cosmic Pictures
March 28, 2003	Assassination Tango	distribution only; produced by American Zoetrope and Butcher's Run Films
April 25, 2003	City of Ghosts	North American distribution only; produced by Mainline Productions, Banyan Tree and Kintop Pictures
May 30, 2003	Together	U.S. distribution only
August 29, 2003	Jeepers Creepers II	distribution in North America, France, Italy, Australia, New Zealand and Japan only; produced by Myriad Pictures and American Zoetrope
October 17, 2003	Pieces of April	distribution outside Japan only; produced by IFC Productions, InDigEnt Productions and Kalkaska Productions; theatrical rights licensed to Optimum Releasing for the U.K. and Ireland and Premium Cine for Spain
February 6, 2004	Osama	U.S. distribution only
May 14, 2004	Coffee and Cigarettes (Note: Owned by its director Jim Jarmusch, with distribution rights licensed to Janus Films, the Criterion Collection and Shout! Studios)	North American distribution only; produced by Smokescreen Inc.
May 28, 2004	Saved!	distribution only; produced by Single Cell Pictures and Infinity Media
July 2, 2004	De-Lovely	copyright holder only; produced by Metro-Goldwyn-Mayer and Winkler Films
August 6, 2004	Code 46	North and Latin American, Australian and New Zealand distribution only; produced by BBC Films, UK Film Council and Revolution Films
September 24, 2004	The Yes Men	North American, Australian and New Zealand distribution only; produced by Free Speech LLC
October 22, 2004	Undertow	North and Latin American, Australian, New Zealand and South African distribution only; produced by ContentFilm and Sunflower Productions
December 22, 2004	Hotel Rwanda	North American distribution only; produced by Lions Gate Films, Miracle Pictures, Seamus Productions, Inside Track and Endgame Entertainment (uncredited)
April 15, 2005	The Amityville Horror	copyright holder only; produced by Metro-Goldwyn-Mayer, Dimension Films, Platinum Dunes and Radar Pictures
September 30, 2005	Capote	co-production with A-Line Pictures, Cooper's Town Productions, Infinity Media and Eagle Vision; distributed by Sony Pictures Classics; Nominee for the Academy Award for Best Picture
May 5, 2006	Art School Confidential	co-production with Mr. Mudd; distributed by Sony Pictures Classics
October 3, 2006	The Woods	co-production with Furst Films; premiered theatrically in the Fantasia Film Festival; released direct-to-video
November 17, 2006	Casino Royale	copyright holder only; produced by Metro-Goldwyn-Mayer, Eon Productions and Columbia Pictures
September 7, 2007	Romance & Cigarettes	North American, Australian, New Zealand and South African distribution only; co-production with the Coen Brothers, Icon Entertainment International, GreeneStreet Films and Janus Films; co-distributed with Boroturro in the U.S.
November 9, 2007 (Note: Released in international theaters on November 7, 2007.)	Lions for Lambs	co-production with Metro-Goldwyn-Mayer, Wildwood Enterprises and Brat Na Pont
November 14, 2008	Quantum of Solace	copyright holder only; produced by Metro-Goldwyn-Mayer, Eon Productions and Columbia Pictures
December 25, 2008	Valkyrie	co-production with Metro-Goldwyn-Mayer and Bad Hat Harry Productions
September 25, 2009	Fame	co-production with Metro-Goldwyn-Mayer and Lakeshore Entertainment

== 2010s ==
Release date	Title	Notes
March 26, 2010	Hot Tub Time Machine	co-production with Metro-Goldwyn-Mayer and New Crime Productions; last original film to date to be released under the banner
November 9, 2012	Skyfall	copyright holder only; produced by Metro-Goldwyn-Mayer, Columbia Pictures and Eon Productions
November 21, 2012	Red Dawn	copyright holder only; produced by Metro-Goldwyn-Mayer (uncredited) and Contrafilm
February 20, 2015	Hot Tub Time Machine 2	copyright holder only; produced by Metro-Goldwyn-Mayer, Paramount Pictures and Panay Films

== Upcoming ==
Release date	Title	Notes
October 1, 2027	Untitled Christopher McQuarrie thriller	co-production with Hungry Bull Productions and Mainstay Entertainment
December 25, 2027	Lizard Music	co-production with Seven Bucks Productions, Out for the Count Productions and Magnetic Fields Entertainment
June 9, 2028	The Mandela Catalogue	co-production with Amblin Entertainment and Paper Street Pictures

=== Undated films ===
Release date	Title	Notes	Production status
TBA	Christmas in Paradise		Pre-production
TBA	The Executioner's Song	co-production with Marsh Entertainment	Pre-production
TBA	Fantasy Camp	co-production with 2.0 Entertainment, Nateland Entertainment and 59th & Prairie Entertainment	Pre-production
TBA	The Girl in the Lake	co-production with These Pictures and Jack Tar Pictures	Pre-production
TBA	Godspeed	television series; co-production with NASCAR, Wandering Rocks Productions and Sugar23; released on Amazon Prime Video	Pre-production
TBA	Heat 2	co-production with Jerry Bruckheimer Films	Pre-production
TBA	Highlander	co-production with 87Eleven Entertainment and Original Film	Post-production
TBA	Kill Your Darlings	co-production with Red Om Films and Tribeca Studios	Pre-production
TBA	The Seventh Man		Pre-production
TBA	The Tenant	co-production with Something Happy Productions	Pre-production
TBA	Tesseract	co-production with Esmail Corp and Barnstorm	Pre-production
TBA	Untitled Basic Instinct reboot	co-production with Vault Entertainment	Pre-production
TBA	Untitled Evan Gershkovich biopic	co-production with Pascal Pictures	Pre-production
TBA	Untitled Scott Cooper film		Pre-production
TBA	Untitled WAGs comedy film		Pre-production

== United Artists Classics ==
Release date	Title	Notes
May 16, 1980	Home Movies	North American distribution only
February 11, 1981	The Last Metro (Note: Owned by mk2, with U.S. distribution rights licensed to Janus Films and the Criterion Collection)	U.S. and English-speaking Canadian distribution only Nominee for the Academy Award for Best Foreign Language Film
May 1, 1981	Just a Gigolo (Note: Owned by Films Sans Frontiéres, with distribution rights licensed to Fabulous Films, which sub-licensed U.S. distribution rights to Shout! Studios)	North American distribution only
July 10, 1981	Lili Marleen (Note: Owned by the Rainer Werner Fassbinder Foundation, with U.S. distribution rights currently licensed to Janus Films and the Criterion Collection)	U.S. and English-speaking Canadian distribution only
October 9, 1981	Ticket to Heaven	U.S. distribution only
October 11, 1981	Man of Iron	U.S. and English-speaking Canadian distribution only Nominee for the Academy Award for Best Foreign Language Film
October 11, 1981	The Woman Next Door	U.S. and English-speaking Canadian distribution only
March 7, 1982	The Weavers: Wasn't That a Time!	North American distribution only
March 14, 1982	Genocide	North American distribution only Winner of the Academy Award for Best Documentary Feature
April 16, 1982	Diva	U.S. and English-speaking Canadian distribution only
August 4, 1982	Lola	U.S. and English-speaking Canadian distribution only
August 27, 1982	Le Beau Mariage	U.S. and English-speaking Canadian distribution only
October 13, 1982	Veronika Voss	North American distribution only
November 12, 1982	Brimstone and Treacle (Note: Distribution rights currently owned by Vinegar Syndrome)	U.S. and English-speaking Canadian distribution only
January 14, 1983	The Girl with the Red Hair	North American distribution only
January 19, 1983	Lianna (Note: Owned by the Independent Film Company)	North American distribution only
January 30, 1983	The Night of the Shooting Stars	U.S. and English-speaking Canadian distribution only
March 4, 1983	Britannia Hospital	North American distribution only
March 11, 1983	Say Amen, Somebody	North American distribution only Inducted into the National Film Registry in 2025
March 18, 1983	The Grey Fox (Note: Distribution rights currently owned by Kino Lorber)	Canadian film; North American distribution only
June 5, 1983	The Divine Emma	U.S. distribution only
June 12, 1983	L'Étoile du Nord	U.S. and English-speaking Canadian distribution only
June 22, 1983	The Draughtsman's Contract (Note: Owned by the British Film Institute, with U.S. distribution rights currently licensed to Zeitgeist Films and Kino Lorber)	North American distribution only; produced by British Film Institute and Channel 4
October 12, 1983	Passion	U.S. and English-speaking Canadian distribution only
October 14, 1983	Streamers	North American distribution only
January 25, 1984	Entre Nous	U.S. and English-speaking Canadian distribution only Nominee of the Academy Award for Best Foreign Language Film
April 20, 1984	Kipperbang	as MGM/UA Classics; North American distribution only
November 16, 1984	A Sunday in the Country	as MGM/UA Classics; U.S. and English-speaking Canadian distribution only
May 31, 1985	Sylvia	as MGM/UA Classics; North American distribution only
July 19, 1985	Wetherby	as MGM/UA Classics; North American distribution only; produced by Film Four International, Zenith Productions and Greenpoint Films
February 14, 1986	Kaos	as MGM/UA Classics; U.S. and English-speaking Canadian distribution only

== See also ==
- Lists of films by studio
- Lists of Metro-Goldwyn-Mayer films
- List of Orion Pictures films
- List of Amazon MGM Studios films
- List of Amazon Prime Video original films

== Notes ==
Film rights notes

Release notes
