= Parla (disambiguation) =

Parla is a municipality in Community of Madrid, Spain.

Parla may also refer to:

- Parla (surname), a surname list
- José Parlá, a Brooklyn-based contemporary artist
- AD Parla, an association football club in Spain
- Alicia Parla, a Cuban rhumba dancer
- CP Parla Escuela, an association football club in Spain
