= Parla (surname) =

Parla or Parlá is a surname. Notable people with the surname include:

- Alicia Parla (1914–1998), Cuban American rhumba dancer and hospital administrator
- José Parlá (born 1973), American contemporary artist
- Massimiliano Parla (born 1976), Italian swimmer

== See also ==
- Parla, a municipality in the Community of Madrid, Spain
