= Hallelujah, I'm a Bum (film) =

1933 film

- Video cover art
- Directed by: Lewis Milestone
- Written by: S.N. Behrman
- Story by: Ben Hecht
- Starring: Al Jolson; Madge Evans; Frank Morgan
- Cinematography: Lucien N. Andriot
- Edited by: Duncan Mansfield
- Music by: Richard Rodgers
- Distributed by: United Artists
- Release date: February 3, 1933
- Running time: 82 minutes
- Country: United States
- Language: English

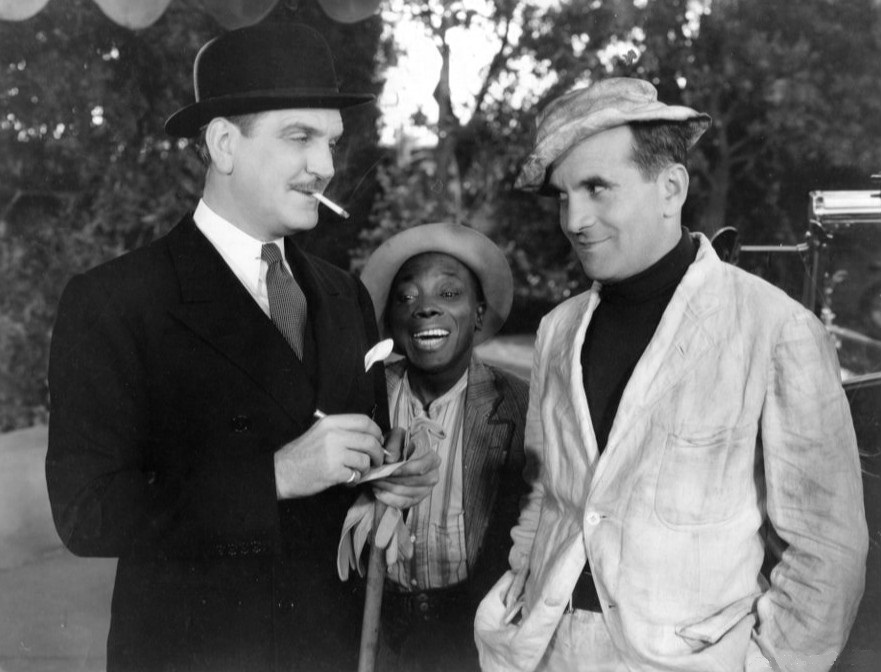
L-R: Frank Morgan, Edgar Conner, and Al Jolson

Hallelujah, I'm a Bum is a 1933 American pre-Code musical comedy film directed by Lewis Milestone and set in the Great Depression. The title is taken from the American folk song "Hallelujah, I'm a Bum", and the film contains a song called "Hallelujah, I'm a Bum", but the song from the movie is entirely different than the folk song from which the title is taken.

The film stars Al Jolson as Bumper, a popular New York tramp, and both romanticizes and satirizes the hobo lifestyle into which many people were forced by the economic conditions of the time. It is noted for its heavy leftist overtones and freewheeling style. Among the production's supporting cast are Frank Morgan, silent comedian Harry Langdon, Chester Conklin of the Keystone Cops, and vaudevillian Edgar Connor. Morgan, who portrays the Wizard in the 1939 version of The Wizard of Oz, foreshadows a line in the later film when he says to Al Jolson, "There's no place like home, there's no place like home".

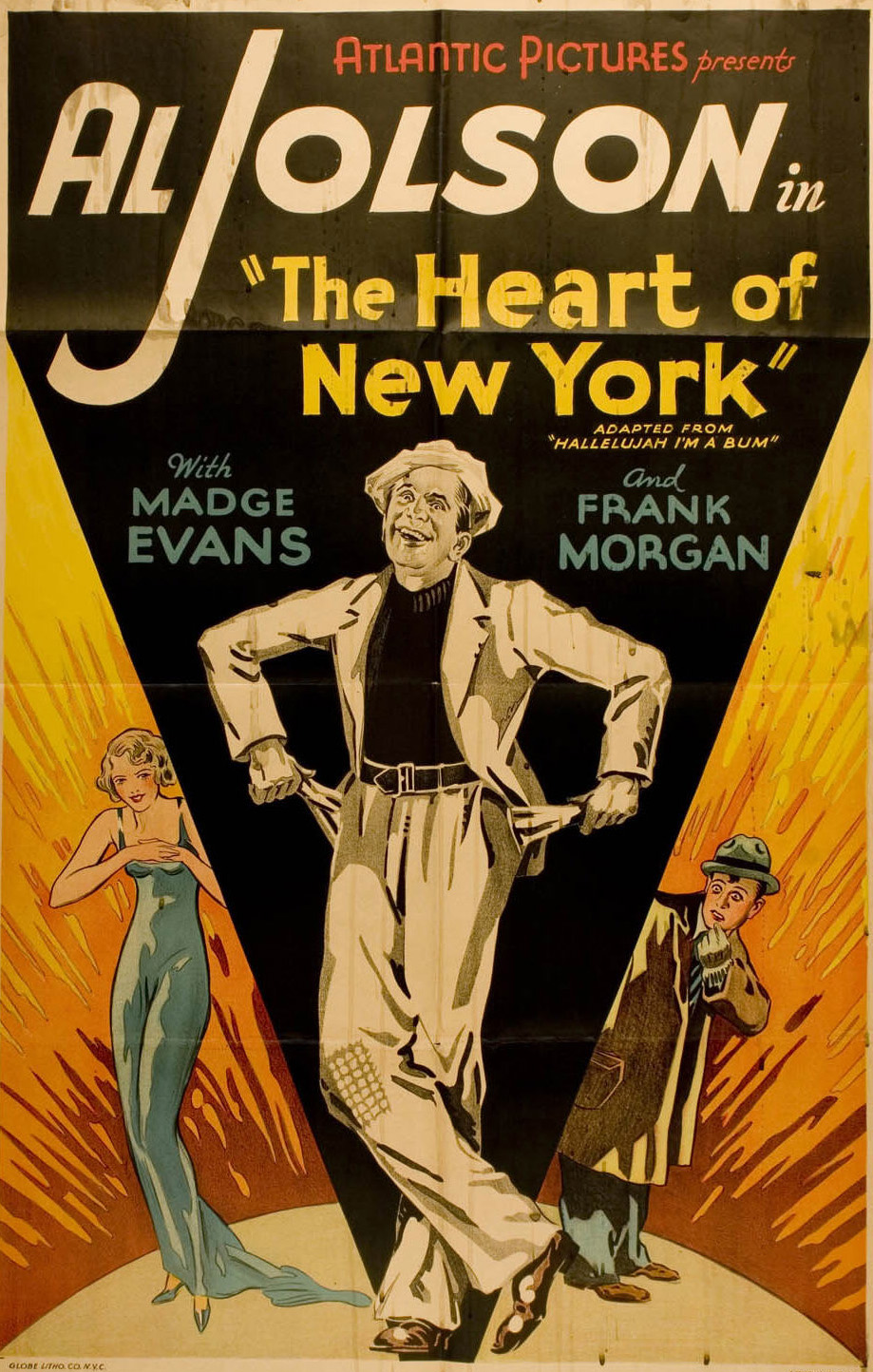
Poster for 1941 reissue, retitled The Heart of New York

== Cast ==
- Al Jolson as Bumper
- Madge Evans as June Marcher
- Frank Morgan as Mayor John Hastings
- Harry Langdon as Egghead
- Chester Conklin as Sunday
- Tyler Brooke as Mayor's Secretary
- Tammany Young as Orlando
- Bert Roach as John
- Edgar Connor as Acorn
- Dorothea Wolbert as Apple Mary
- Louise Carver as Ma Sunday

Songwriters Richard Rodgers and Lorenz Hart also appear uncredited in the film, Rodgers as a photographer’s assistant and Hart as a bank teller.

== Music ==
The music was composed by Richard Rodgers and the lyrics by Lorenz Hart. The score includes the jazz standard "You Are Too Beautiful", which is played several times throughout the movie.

The complete list of musical numbers in the film is:

- "I Gotta Get Back to New York"
- "My Pal Bumper"
- "Hallelujah, I'm a Bum"
- "Laying the Cornerstone"
- "Sleeping Beauty" (dropped before the film was released)
- "Dear June"
- "Bumper Found a Grand"
- "What Do You Want With Money?"
- "Kangaroo Court"
- "I'd Do It Again"
- "You Are Too Beautiful"

== Reception ==
In 1998, Jonathan Rosenbaum of the Chicago Reader included the film in his unranked list of the best American films not included on the AFI Top 100.

== See also ==
- List of United Artists films
