= Challenge the Wild =

- Directed by: Frank A. Graham
- Screenplay by: Frank A. Graham
- Produced by: Frank A. Graham
- Starring: George Graham; Sheilah Graham
- Cinematography: Frank A. Graham
- Music by: Marlin Skiles
- Production company: Frank A. Graham Productions
- Distributed by: United Artists
- Release date: June 4, 1954
- Running time: 69 minutes
- Country: United States
- Language: English

Challenge the Wild is an American wildlife documentary film written and directed by Frank A. Graham. The film was released on June 4, 1954, by United Artists.

== Cast ==
- George Graham as George Graham
- Sheilah Graham as Mrs. George Graham
