= The Angry God =

- Directed by: Van Campen Heilner
- Screenplay by: Lester Crocker; Harold McCracken
- Story by: Emma-Lindsay Squier
- Produced by: Edward J. Peskay
- Starring: Alice Parla; Casimiro Ortega; Mario Forastieri
- Cinematography: Luis Osorno Barona
- Edited by: Robert Matthews
- Music by: Vernon Duke
- Production company: Carlisle Productions
- Distributed by: United Artists
- Release date: March 14, 1948
- Running time: 57 minutes
- Country: United States
- Language: English

The Angry God is a 1948 American drama film directed by Van Campen Heilner and written by Lester Crocker and Harold McCracken. The film stars Alice Parla, Casimiro Ortega and Mario Forastieri. The film was released on March 14, 1948, by United Artists.

== Cast ==
- Alice Parla as Mapoli
- Casimiro Ortega as Colima
- Mario Forastieri as Nezatl
