= Harold McCracken =

American explorer and writer

Harold McCracken (1894–1983) was an American writer, Alaskan grizzly bear hunter, biplane stunt photographer, cinematographer, producer and museum director. He was a noted explorer, who led expeditions in the 1920s tracing the possibility of a long-ago land bridge between Siberia and Alaska.

== Expeditions ==
In 1913 at age 18 McCracken traveled by train to British Columbia where he lived with relatives for a time. McCracken undertook several expeditions to Alaska from 1916 to 1928. The first expedition was intended to obtain several big game specimens for a museum at Ohio State University. His 1928 expedition found four mummified bodies on a remote island in the Aleutians. As McCracken stated in a special dispatch to the New York Times, the Stone Age bodies were in a tomb made of morticed logs covered with animal skins, with one of the bodies in a separate chamber, and described as an "Ice King". In a 1929 address to the National Geographic Society in the Washington Auditorium, McCracken told his audience that amber beads found on one of the mummies were important evidence of Stone Age connections between America and Asia.

== Advocating bayonets to oust Japanese ==
In 1942, the Daily Alaska Empire newspaper published an article in which McCracken had stated that the Japanese invaders of the Aleutians should be ejected by using bayonets; going on to assert that tanks and bombers would not work.

== Buffalo Bill Historical Center ==
McCracken, who was then living at 318 Warwick Avenue in Douglaston, New York and completing a book on artist George Catlin, was persuaded to transform an empty building donated by Gertrude Vanderbilt-Whitney in 1959 into the spectacular Buffalo Bill Historical Center in Cody, Wyoming. "I wouldn't undertake it again for all the tea in China," he said, "but I was always interested in challenges. I had friends in New York art galleries and I knew a lot of collectors because of my interest in western art."

In 1963, McCracken discovered the body of a Stone Age man in a cave near Yellowstone National Park. The body, which he dated to the 7th century, was wrapped in tanned sheepskin, but showed no sign of deliberate mummification.

He was subsequently honored with the McCracken Research Library, dedicated in 1980. New library facilities were then opened to the public in 1994. McCracken retired from the Buffalo Bill Museum in 1974, and continued to live with his family, within sight of the historical center, until his death in 1983.

== Works ==
- God's Frozen Children (1930) Garden City, NY: Doubleday
- The American Cowboy (1973) Garden City, NY: Doubleday.
- The Beast That Walks Like Man: The Story of the Grizzly Bear. (1955) Garden City, NY: Hanover House.
- Beyond the Frozen Frontier. (1936) NY: Robert Speller Publishing Corp.
- The Biggest Bear on Earth. (1943) Philadelphia and New York: Frederick A. Stokes Co.
- The Buffalo Bill Story: A Brief Account. (n.d.) Cody, Wyo.: Buffalo Bill Historical Center.
- Caribou Traveler. (1949) Philadelphia: J.B. Lippincott.
- The Charles M. Russell Book: The Life and Work of the Cowboy Artist. (1957) Garden City, NY: Doubleday.
- The Flaming Bear. (1951) Philadelphia: Lippincott.
- The Frank Tenney Johnson Book: A Master Painter of the Old West. (1974) Garden City, NY: Doubleday.
- Frank Tenney Johnson Western Paintings. (1974) Dallas, Tex.: The Exchange Bank and Trust Co.
- Frederic Remington. (1971) NY: Graham Galleries.
- Frederic Remington, Artist of the Old West (1947) Introduction by James Chillman Jr. Philadelphia: J.B. Lippincott Co.
- The Frederic Remington Book: A Pictorial History of the West. (1966) Garden City, NY: Doubleday.
- Frederic Remington Memorial Collection.(1954) NY: Knoedler Galleries.
- The Frederic Remington Studio Collection. NY: Gallery Press.
- George Catlin and the Old Frontier.(1959) NY: Dial Press.
- The Great White Buffalo. (1946) NY and Philadelphia: J.B. Lippincott Co.
- A Heritage of the Blackfeet. (1972) Cody, Wyo.: Buffalo Bill Historical Center.
- Hoof, Claws and Antlers: the Story of American Big-Game Animals. Illustrated by Lee J. Ames. (1958) Garden City, NY: Garden City Books.
- Hunters of the Stormy Sea. (1957)Garden City, NY: Doubleday & Co.
- Iglaome: The Lone Hunter. (1930) NY: The Century Co.
- The Mummy Cave Project in Northwestern Wyoming. (1978) Cody, Wyo.: Buffalo Bill Historical Center.
- Nicolai Fechin. (1961) NY: Hammer Galleries.
- Pirate of the North. (1953) Philadelphia: Lippincott.
- Portrait of the Old West: With a Biographical Check List of Western Artists. (1952) Foreword by R.W.G. Vail. NY: McGraw-Hill.
- Roughnecks and Gentlemen. (1968) Garden City, NY: Doubleday. (McCracken's Autobiography).
- Sentinel of the Snow Peaks. (1978) Philadelphia: J.B. Lippincott.
- Toughy. (1948) Philadelphia: J. B. Lippincott & Co.
- Trapping: The Craft and Science of Catching Fur-Bearing Animals. (1947) Illustrated by Howard L. Hastings. NY: A.S. Barnes.
- Winning of the West. (1955) Garden City, NY: Garden City Books.
