= Alicia Parla =

Cuban rhumba dancer

Alicia Parlá
- Born: 1914; Havana, Cuba
- Died: October 6, 1998 (aged 83–84); Miami, Florida, United States
- Occupations: Rhumba dance; Hospital administrator
- Years active: 1930–1950s
- Spouses: Antonio Fuello (divorced); Guillermo Amuchastegui (divorced); Armando Galis-Menéndez (his death)
- Children: 1
- Dancing career
- Dances: Rhumba

Alicia Parlá (1914 – October 6, 1998) was a Cuban rhumba dancer and hospital administrator who was called "the Queen of Rumba" by the press. Born into a strict middle-class Cuban family, she and her family moved to Miami when Cuba became politically turbulent in the 1920s. Parla began dancing with Don Justo Angel Azpiazú in 1930 and toured the United States and Europe during the first half of the decade. She taught rhumba to Edward, Prince of Wales at his Monte Carlo villa in 1932 before her European tour ended in 1933. Parla returned to Cuba as per her father's instruction in 1934 and went into a domesticated life. She briefly came back into public view in two films and the occasional nostalgic show.

== Biography ==
Parla was born in Havana, Cuba in 1914 to a middle-class family. Her father worked as an ophthalmologist, and her uncle was Cuba's first aviator. Parla had one sister, Zilia Navarete. Her mother was strict, warning her daughter from age nine onward almost daily not to marry unless she was no longer a virgin. During her childhood, Parla had the ambition to become a professional rhumba dancer after becoming obsessed with the technique, but her father was against Parla dancing and wanted her to obtain self-sufficiency by becoming a typist and then marrying. In Cuba's 1920s political turbulence where Gerardo Machado became dictator of the country, the family moved to Miami, and Parla was sent to convent school in Key West, while her father remained in Havana.

After graduating, Parla and her mother moved to New York, defying her mother's wishes and took a job as a cigarette girl in a night club in Greenwich Village and waiting to attract more attention over other dancers, as she shared the house where she lodged with a dance school. She agreed not to tell her father about her job and allowed her mother to work as a on-the-job chaperone and threatening to kill herself. Parla's job gave her the confidence to audition in the presence of director of the Havana Casino Orchestra Don Justo Angel Azpiazú, after the club's Spanish dancer felt unwell. Out of 150 candidates held at an audition at the Paramount Theatre, she won the audition to be part of Azpiatzú's dance team because of "her gyrating hips". Parla was due to be paired with a male dancer but she demanded to Azpiatzú that she dance the rumba alone after she declared one of the candidate's uncoordinated. She said, "The rumba is very sexual, and I didn't like doing it with a partner."

Parla and the group toured New York in 1930, becoming a success with her "sexually suggestive rumba act". The following year, she toured the United States to demonstrate her technique, before moving to Europe with her mother to tour with the group in 1932. During an engagement in Monte Carlo, Parla attracted the attention of Edward, Prince of Wales and his brother Albert, Duke of York. Edward summoned Parla to his villa the next day to teach him the rhumba. On Bastille Day on July 14, 1932, she descended a stairwell draped in Cuba's red, white and blue colors, causing the French to mistake her patriotism of her homeland as a gesture to their own national holiday and earning her praise with shouts of "Vive La France". This led "Mariana scarfs" copied from her costume to go on sale in chic French stores, along with casseroles, cocktails and perfumes named after her, and taught Josephine Baker the rhumba. Parla then went to Brussels, where Leopold of Belgium was so taken with her rhumba that he provided her with a large enough box of chocolates that she stepped on it.

She returned to the United States via the SS Île de France in November 1933. Parla spent 1934 dancing at Mon Paris nightclub, before complying with the wishes of her father at the end of the year to return to Havana and marry a millionaire rancher. Life living on a Cuban became too domesticated as a housewife and mother and she exchanged marriage for a return to public view. In 1935, Parla received an appointment to teach Edward the cucaracha in London, and said wanted Edward to visit Havana. She became friends with Ernest Hemingway, and featured in two films in Mexico, The Angry God and The Black Privateer, along with multiple documentaries. After Fidel Castro took power in Cuba in 1959, Parla and her family fled to the United States and settled in Miami, working as a hospital administrator and typist at Victoria Hospital before retiring 20 years later, with the occasional appearance in nostalgia shows.

== Personal life ==
Parla was married three times. Her first marriage to millionaire rancher Antonio Fuello resulted in a daughter before they divorced. Parla's second marriage, to jai alai player Guillermo Amuchastegui who toured the globe in the 1940s, also ended in divorce. She was lastly married to Armando Gali-Menendez, a senior Cuban Army officer (disputed) serving under the rule of Fulgencio Batista; he predeceased Parlá. She died from cancer on the night of October 6, 1998 in Miami.

== Reception and legacy ==
Orlando González Esteva, a historian, called her "a fabulous story of Cuban music", and several publications termed her "the Queen of Rumba". Walter Winchell, the journalist, called Parla "that lovely Havana torso flipper".
