= Yesterday and Today (film) =

- Directed by: Abner J. Greshler
- Starring: George Jessel
- Production companies: Abner J. Greshler Productions, Inc.
- Distributed by: United Artists
- Release dates: November 4, 1953 (Los Angeles); March 12, 1954 (New York)
- Country: United States
- Language: English

Yesterday and Today is a 1953 United Artists American compilation film produced and directed by Abner J. Greshler and narrated by George Jessel. The film consists mostly of brief clips from silent short films from the first decade of the 20th century. The film compiles footage from two previous British compilation films, Those Were the Days and Return Fare to Laughter, both 1951 products of Butcher's Film Service, interspersed with introductions and commentary by Jessel. However, many of the clips are misidentified.

== Segments ==
Yesterday and Today consists of film excerpts interspersed with commentary by George Jessel, who is sitting at an office desk facing the camera but gazing slightly askance, presumably at cue cards. In his introductions for each film, Jessel misidentifies many of the clips. None of the films included are complete, and these excerpts may be the only extant remains of the films from which they are culled.

Film historian Richard M. Roberts led an exhaustive effort by experts on early silent films to correctly identify the films featured in Yesterday and Today. The film's segments include, sequentially:

1. An introductory montage
2. A series of 1900s newsreels showing European monarchs, Andrew Carnegie, Theodore Roosevelt, Woodrow Wilson and various fashions-
3. That Fatal Sneeze (1907), a British trick film by Hepworth Pictures, misidentified as "Sneezing Powder" from 1899
4. An unidentified French chase film
5. Le chevalier mystère (1899), starring and directed by Georges Méliès, misidentified as "The Living Head"
6. Liquid Electricity (1907), also known as The Inventor's Galvanic Fluid, an American Vitagraph film directed by J. Stuart Blackton, misidentified as a French film called "The Professor's Mistake"
7. La petite Jules Verne (1907), French Pathé trick film directed by Gaston Velle, misidentified as "Little Jimmy's Nightmare"
8. A Trip to the Moon (1908), a Pathé remake of the 1902 Méliès film directed by Segundo de Chomón
9. Les chiens policiers (1907), a Pathé film directed by Lucien Nonguet
10. The Bride Retires (date unknown), likely a Pathé film
11. Chumps (1912), a Vitagraph film starring John Bunny and Leah Baird, directed by George D. Baker
12. Mariage au puzzle (1910) starring Max Linder
13. Polidor contro la suocera (1912) starring Ferdinand Guillaume as his recurring Polidor character
14. The President's Special (1910), an Edison Studios film, misidentified as "Asleep at the Switch"
15. Little Moritz enlève Rosalie (1911), an installment in the Little Moritz Pathé series
16. Cambrioleur sentimental (1909), a French Pathé film misidentified as Russian (presumably because of its Russian-language intertitles)
17. The Last Cartridge, An Incident of the Sepoy Rebellion in India (1908), an American Vitagraph film set during the Indian Rebellion of 1857
18. Muggins, V. C. (1909), a British film directed by David Aylott from the Cricks & Martin Films studio
19. Un drame à Séville (1907), a French film directed by Louis J. Gasnier and starring Max Linder, misidentified as a Spanish film titled "A Matador's Love"
20. The Sheriff's Daughter (1911), an American Pathé film starring Bessie Eyton and Joseph De Grasse, misidentified as "Nell and the Bandit"
21. Into the Jungle (1912), a Kalem Company American film starring Lottie Pickford, Tom Moore and Stuart Holmes
22. A montage of brief clips from newsreels and feature films showing Marie Dressler, John Gilbert, Rudolph Valentino, George Arliss, George Fitzmaurice, Ronald Colman, Blanche Sweet, Lon Chaney, Clara Bow, Dolores del Rio, Eddie Cantor, Marion Davies, Harold Lloyd, Pola Negri, Tom Mix, Charles Chaplin, Mack Swain, Lionel Barrymore, Mary Pickford and Douglas Fairbanks
23. Alice in the Jungle (1925), one of the Alice Comedies animated films produced by Walt Disney, but without its live-action footage
24. Newsreel footage of Will Rogers at 1932 Democratic National Convention
25. Jessel singing Toot, Toot, Tootsie (Goo' Bye!) in a tribute to Al Jolson
26. A montage of still photos of contemporary newspaper and magazine articles about the film industry and its stars

== Production ==
Despite the fact that the film clips featured in Yesterday and Today were taken directly from two 1951 British compilation films, producer and director Abner J. Greshler claimed that his production staff had reviewed approximately 100,000 feet of film from as early as 1891 to prepare the film. Following the film's initial run, Greshler announced that he had acquired 40 additional early films from which he would produce another compilation film, to be titled Do You Remember?, with Mack Sennett as the narrator. Greshler also planned to release a novelty film titled The Advance of Time, but neither film materialized.

== Reception ==
In a contemporary review for The New York Times, critic Bosley Crowther wrote: "Mr. Jessel's narration is short on historical content, long on gags, and is punctuated by his solemn rendition of 'Toot, Toot, Tootsie' in the Al Jolson style."
