= List of American films of 1961 =

American films released in 1961

More than 130 American films were released in 1961.

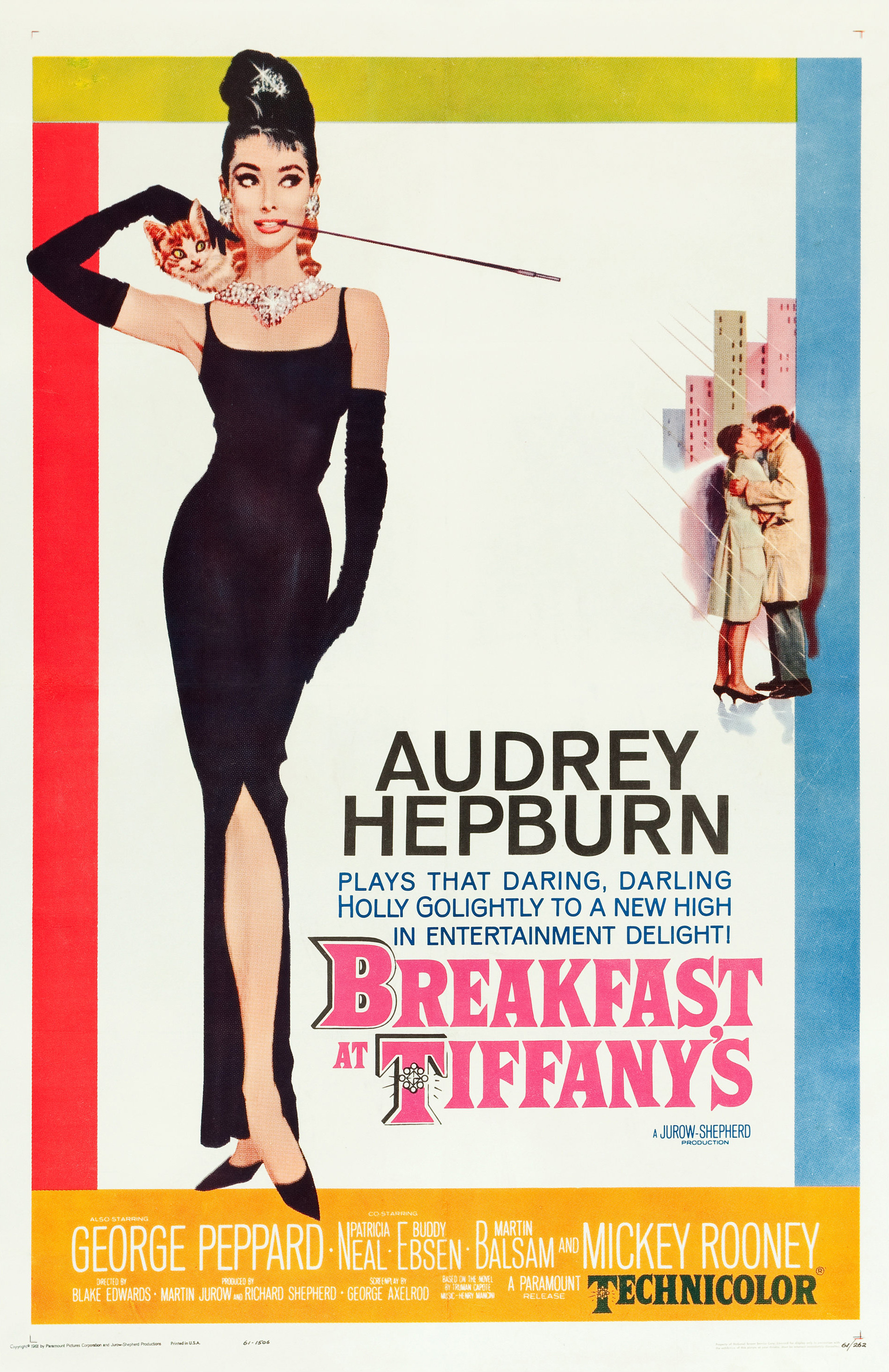
Breakfast at Tiffany's starring Audrey Hepburn.

== Top-grossing films (U.S.) ==
| 1961; Rank | Title | Studio | Gross |
| 1. | The Guns of Navarone* | Columbia | $28,900,000 |
| 2. | West Side Story | United Artists | $19,646,000 |
| 3. | One Hundred and One Dalmatians | Disney | $14,000,000 |
| 4. | El Cid | Allied Artists | $12,000,000 |
| 5. | The Absent-Minded Professor* | Disney | $11,426,000 |
| 6. | The Parent Trap* | Disney | $11,322,000 |
| 7. | La Dolce Vita* | Astor/AIP | $8,000,000 |
| 8. | Lover Come Back | Universal | $7,625,000 |
| 9. | King of Kings | MGM | $6,520,000 |
| 10. | Bayou (film)* | CDA/United Artists | $6,000,000 |

== A–B ==
| Title | Director | Cast | Genre | Note |
|---|---|---|---|---|
| 20,000 Eyes | Jack Leewood | Gene Nelson, Merry Anders | Thriller | 20th Century Fox |
| The Absent-Minded Professor | Robert Stevenson | Fred MacMurray, Nancy Olson, Keenan Wynn, Tommy Kirk, Ed Wynn, Edward Andrews, Leon Ames, Elliott Reid | Comedy | Disney; remade in 1997; 3 Oscar nominations |
| Ada | Daniel Mann | Susan Hayward, Dean Martin | Drama | MGM; based on novel by Wirt Williams |
| All in a Night's Work | Joseph Anthony | Dean Martin, Shirley MacLaine, Cliff Robertson | Comedy | Paramount |
| All Hands on Deck | Norman Taurog | Pat Boone, Barbara Eden, Buddy Hackett | Musical | 20th Century Fox |
| Angel Baby | Paul Wendkos | George Hamilton, Mercedes McCambridge, Joan Blondell | Drama | Allied Artists; film debut of Burt Reynolds |
| Atlas | Roger Corman | Michael Forest, Barboura Morris | Adventure | American International Pictures |
| Armored Command | Byron Haskin | Howard Keel, Tina Louise, Earl Holliman | War | Allied Artists |
| Atlantis, the Lost Continent | George Pal | John Dall, Edward Platt | Science fiction | MGM |
| Babes in Toyland | Jack Donohue | Tommy Sands, Annette Funicello, Ray Bolger, Ed Wynn | Musical | Disney; based on Victor Herbert operetta |
| Bachelor in Paradise | Jack Arnold | Bob Hope, Lana Turner, Paula Prentiss, Janis Paige | Comedy | MGM |
| Back Street | David Miller | Susan Hayward, John Gavin, Vera Miles | Drama | Universal; from Fannie Hurst novel; remake of 1932 and 1941 films |
| Battle at Bloody Beach | Herbert Coleman | Audie Murphy, Dolores Michaels | War | 20th Century Fox |
| The Beast of Yucca Flats | Coleman Francis | Tor Johnson | Science fiction | |
| The Big Bankroll | Joseph M. Newman | David Janssen, Dianne Foster, Diana Dors | Crime | Allied Artists |
| The Big Gamble | Richard Fleischer | Stephen Boyd, Juliette Gréco, David Wayne | Adventure | 20th Century Fox |
| The Big Show | James B. Clark | Esther Williams, Cliff Robertson, Robert Vaughn | Drama | 20th Century Fox |
| The Big Wave | Tad Danielewski | Sessue Hayakawa, Mickey Curtis, Koji Shitara, Hiroyuki Ota | Drama | Allied Artists; Co-production with Japan. |
| Blast of Silence | Allen Baron | Allen Baron, Larry Tucker | Thriller | Universal |
| Bloodlust! | Ralph Brooke | Robert Reed, June Kenney | Horror | Crown International |
| Blue Hawaii | Norman Taurog | Elvis Presley, Joan Blackman, Angela Lansbury, Roland Winters | Musical | Paramount |
| Blueprint for Robbery | Jerry Hopper | J. Pat O'Malley, Robert Gist | Crime | Paramount Pictures |
| Boy Who Caught a Crook | Edward L. Cahn | Wanda Hendrix, Roger Mobley | Adventure | United Artists |
| Breakfast at Tiffany's | Blake Edwards | Audrey Hepburn, George Peppard, Buddy Ebsen, Patricia Neal, Martin Balsam, Mickey Rooney | Drama | Paramount; based on Truman Capote story; won two Oscars |
| Bridge to the Sun | Étienne Périer | Carroll Baker, James Shigeta | Drama | MGM |
| Buffalo Gun | Albert C. Gannaway | Webb Pierce, Wayne Morris, Mary Ellen Kay | Western | Independent |
| By Love Possessed | John Sturges | Lana Turner, Efrem Zimbalist, Jr., Jason Robards | Drama | United Artists |

== C–I ==
| Title | Director | Cast | Genre | Note |
|---|---|---|---|---|
| The Cat Burglar | William Witney | Jack Hogan, June Kenney, John Baer | Thriller | United Artists |
| The Children's Hour | William Wyler | Audrey Hepburn, Shirley MacLaine, James Garner | Drama | United Artists; from Lillian Hellman play; five Oscar nominations |
| The Choppers | Leigh Jason | Arch Hall Jr. | Crime | Fairway International Pictures |
| Claudelle Inglish | Gordon Douglas | Diane McBain, Arthur Kennedy, Chad Everett | Drama | Warner Bros. |
| The Clown and the Kid | Edward L. Cahn | John Lupton, Michael McGreevey, Mary Webster | Drama | United Artists |
| A Cold Wind in August | Alexander Singer | Lola Albright, Scott Marlowe, Joe De Santis | Drama | United Artists |
| The Comancheros | Michael Curtiz | John Wayne, Stuart Whitman, Ina Balin | Western | 20th Century Fox; Curtiz's final film |
| Come September | Robert Mulligan | Rock Hudson, Gina Lollobrigida, Bobby Darin, Sandra Dee | Comedy | Universal |
| The Continental Twist | William J. Hole Jr. | Louis Prima, June Wilkinson, Gertrude Michael | Comedy | American International Pictures |
| Creature from the Haunted Sea | Roger Corman | Antony Carbone, Betsy Jones-Moreland, Robert Towne | Science fiction | Independent |
| Cry for Happy | George Marshall | Glenn Ford, Donald O'Connor, James Shigeta | Comedy | Columbia |
| The Deadly Companions | Sam Peckinpah | Maureen O'Hara, Brian Keith, Chill Wills | Western | Pathé America; Peckinpah's first film |
| The Devil at 4 O'Clock | Mervyn LeRoy | Spencer Tracy, Frank Sinatra, Grégoire Aslan | Adventure | Columbia |
| The Devil's Hand | William J. Hole Jr. | Robert Alda, Linda Christian, Ariadna Welter | Horror | Crown International Pictures |
| Diary of a Nudist | Doris Wishman | Davee Decker, Norman Casserly | Comedy | |
| Dondi | Albert Zugsmith | David Janssen, Patti Page, Walter Winchell | Comedy | Allied Artists; based on comic strip |
| El Cid | Anthony Mann | Charlton Heston, Sophia Loren, Raf Vallone, Geneviève Page, Herbert Lom | Historical epic | Allied Artists; three Oscar nominations |
| The Errand Boy | Jerry Lewis | Jerry Lewis, Brian Donlevy, Howard McNear | Comedy | Paramount |
| Everything's Ducky | Don Taylor | Buddy Hackett, Mickey Rooney, Jackie Cooper | Comedy | Columbia |
| The Exiles | Kent Mackenzie | | Documentary | Contemporary Films |
| The Explosive Generation | Buzz Kulik | William Shatner, Patty McCormack, Virginia Field | Drama | United Artists |
| Fanny | Joshua Logan | Leslie Caron, Charles Boyer | Drama | Warner Bros.; five Oscar nominations |
| Fear No More | Bernard Wiesen | Mala Powers, Jacques Bergerac, Anna Lee Carroll | Thriller | Astor Pictures |
| A Fever in the Blood | Vincent Sherman | Efrem Zimbalist Jr., Angie Dickinson, Don Ameche | Drama | Warner Bros. |
| The Fiercest Heart | George Sherman | Stuart Whitman, Juliet Prowse, Geraldine Fitzgerald | Drama | 20th Century Fox |
| Five Minutes to Live | Bill Karn | Johnny Cash, Cay Forrester | Drama | Somera Productions-Flower Film Productions |
| Flight of the Lost Balloon | Nathan Juran | Mala Powers, Marshall Thompson | Science fiction | A.I.P. |
| The Flight That Disappeared | Reginald LeBorg | Craig Hill, Paula Raymond | Drama | United Artists |
| Flower Drum Song | Henry Koster | Nancy Kwan, James Shigeta, Jack Soo, Miyoshi Umeki | Musical | Universal; based on play; five Oscar nominations |
| Force of Impulse | Saul Swimmer | Robert Alda, Jeff Donnell, J. Carrol Naish | Drama | Astor Pictures |
| Francis of Assisi | Michael Curtiz | Bradford Dillman, Dolores Hart, Stuart Whitman | Drama | Fox |
| Frontier Uprising | Edward L. Cahn | Jim Davis, Nestor Paiva | Western | United Artists |
| The Gambler Wore a Gun | Edward L. Cahn | Jim Davis, Merry Anders | Western | United Artists |
| The George Raft Story | Joseph M. Newman | Ray Danton, Jayne Mansfield, Julie London | Biography | Allied Artists |
| Gidget Goes Hawaiian | Paul Wendkos | Deborah Walley, James Darren | Comedy | Columbia Pictures; sequel to Gidget |
| Go Naked in the World | Ranald MacDougall | Gina Lollobrigida, Anthony Franciosa, Ernest Borgnine | Drama | MGM |
| Gold of the Seven Saints | Gordon Douglas | Clint Walker, Roger Moore | Adventure | Warner Bros. |
| Goodbye Again | Anatole Litvak | Ingrid Bergman, Anthony Perkins | Drama | United Artists; based on Françoise Sagan novel |
| The Great Impostor | Robert Mulligan | Tony Curtis, Edmond O'Brien, Karl Malden | Biography | Universal; based on Robert Crichton book |
| Greyfriars Bobby | Don Chaffey | Donald Crisp, Laurence Naismith, Kay Walsh | Drama | Disney |
| Gun Fight | Edward L. Cahn | James Brown, Joan Staley | Western | United Artists |
| Gun Street | Edward L. Cahn | James Brown, Jean Willes, John Clarke | Western | United Artists |
| The Happy Thieves | George Marshall | Rex Harrison, Rita Hayworth | Comedy | United Artists |
| Hey, Let's Twist! | Greg Garrison | Joey Dee, Jo Ann Campbell | Musical | Paramount |
| Homicidal | William Castle | Glenn Corbett, Patricia Breslin, Eugenie Leontovich | Thriller | Columbia |
| The Honeymoon Machine | Richard Thorpe | Steve McQueen, Jim Hutton, Paula Prentiss | Comedy | MGM; based on play by Lorenzo Semple Jr. |
| The Hoodlum Priest | Irvin Kershner | Don Murray, Keir Dullea | Biography | United Artists |
| The Hustler | Robert Rossen | Paul Newman, Jackie Gleason, Piper Laurie, George C. Scott, Myron McCormick | Drama | 20th Century Fox; based on novel by Walter Tevis; nine Oscar nominations |

== J–R ==
| Title | Director | Cast | Genre | Note |
|---|---|---|---|---|
| Judgment at Nuremberg | Stanley Kramer | Spencer Tracy, Marlene Dietrich, Richard Widmark, Maximilian Schell, Burt Lancaster | Drama | United Artists; Academy Awards for Schell, screenplay; eleven nominations |
| King of Kings | Nicholas Ray | Jeffrey Hunter, Robert Ryan, Hurd Hatfield, Rip Torn | Biblical drama | MGM; remake of 1927 film |
| The Ladies Man | Jerry Lewis | Jerry Lewis, Lillian Briggs, Helen Traubel | Comedy | Paramount |
| The Last Sunset | Robert Aldrich | Rock Hudson, Kirk Douglas, Dorothy Malone | Western | Universal; based on Howard Rigsby novel |
| The Last Time I Saw Archie | Jack Webb | Robert Mitchum, Jack Webb, Martha Hyer | Comedy | United Artists |
| The Lawbreakers | Joseph M. Newman | Jack Warden, Vera Miles | Drama | MGM |
| The Little Shepherd of Kingdom Come | Andrew McLaglen | Jimmie Rodgers, Luana Patten | Drama | 20th Century Fox |
| The Long Rope | William Witney | Hugh Marlowe. Alan Hale, Jr. | Western | 20th Century Fox |
| Look in Any Window | William Alland | Paul Anka, Gigi Perreau | Drama | Allied Artists |
| Love in a Goldfish Bowl | Jack Sher | Tommy Sands, Fabian | Comedy | Paramount |
| Lover Come Back | Delbert Mann | Doris Day, Rock Hudson, Tony Randall, Edie Adams | Comedy | Universal |
| Mad Dog Coll | Burt Balaban | John Davis Chandler, Brooke Hayward, Jerry Orbach | Drama | Columbia Pictures |
| Madison Avenue | H. Bruce Humberstone | Dana Andrews, Eleanor Parker, Jeanne Crain | Drama | 20th Century Fox |
| A Majority of One | Mervyn LeRoy | Rosalind Russell, Alec Guinness | Comedy | Warner Bros.; based on Leonard Spigelgass play |
| Man-Trap | Edmond O'Brien | Jeffrey Hunter, David Janssen, Stella Stevens | Drama | Paramount |
| Marines, Let's Go | Raoul Walsh | Tom Tryon, David Hedison | War | 20th Century Fox |
| The Marriage-Go-Round | Walter Lang | Julie Newmar, James Mason, Susan Hayward | Comedy | Fox; based on Leslie Stevens play |
| Master of the World | William Witney | Vincent Price, Charles Bronson | Adventure | A.I.P. |
| The Misfits | John Huston | Clark Gable, Marilyn Monroe, Montgomery Clift | Drama, Romance, Western | United Artists; final film for Gable, Monroe |
| A Matter of Morals | John Cromwell | Maj-Britt Nilsson, Mogens Wieth, Eva Dahlbeck | Drama | United Artists |
| Misty | James B. Clark | Arthur O'Connell, Anne Seymour, David Ladd | Family | 20th Century Fox |
| Most Dangerous Man Alive | Allan Dwan | Ron Randell, Debra Paget | Science fiction | Columbia; Dwan's final film |
| Mr. Sardonicus | William Castle | Oskar Homolka, Ronald Lewis, Audrey Dalton. Guy Rolfe | Horror | Columbia |
| Mysterious Island | Cy Endfield | Gary Merrill, Herbert Lom, Beth Rogan | Science fiction | Columbia; based on Jules Verne novel |
| The Naked Edge | Michael Anderson | Gary Cooper, Deborah Kerr | Suspense | United Artists; Cooper's final film |
| Night Tide | Curtis Harrington | Dennis Hopper, Marjorie Cameron, Linda Lawson | Fantasy | A.I.P. |
| Nude on the Moon | Doris Wishman | | Adult | |
| Ole Rex | Robert Hinkle | Bill Coontz, Billy Hughes | Western | Universal |
| On the Double | Melville Shavelson | Danny Kaye, Dana Wynter | Comedy | Paramount |
| One-Eyed Jacks | Marlon Brando | Marlon Brando, Karl Malden, Katy Jurado | Western | Paramount; only film directed by Brando |
| One Hundred and One Dalmatians | Clyde Geronimi, Hamilton Luske, Wolfgang Reitherman | Ben Wright, Betty Lou Gerson, Rod Taylor (voices) | Animated | Disney; live-action remake in 1996 |
| One, Two, Three | Billy Wilder | James Cagney, Horst Bucholtz, Pamela Tiffin | Comedy | United Artists; Cagney's last film until 1981 |
| Operation Bottleneck | Edward L. Cahn | Ron Foster, Miiko Taka | War | United Artists |
| Operation Eichmann | R.G. Springsteen | Werner Klemperer, Ruta Lee | Drama | Allied Artists |
| The Outsider | Delbert Mann | Tony Curtis, James Franciscus, Bruce Bennett | Biography | Universal; story of Ira Hayes |
| The Parent Trap | David Swift | Hayley Mills, Brian Keith, Maureen O'Hara | Comedy | Disney; remade in 1998 |
| Paris Blues | Martin Ritt | Sidney Poitier, Paul Newman, Joanne Woodward | Musical Drama | United Artists |
| Parrish | Delmer Daves | Troy Donahue, Claudette Colbert, Karl Malden | Drama | Warner Bros. |
| The Phantom Planet | William Marshall | Coleen Gray, Anthony Dexter | Science fiction | A.I.P. |
| Pirates of Tortuga | Robert D. Webb | Ken Scott, Letícia Román | Adventure | 20th Century Fox |
| The Pit and the Pendulum | Roger Corman | Vincent Price, John Kerr | Horror | A.I.P.; from Edgar Allan Poe story |
| The Pleasure of His Company | George Seaton | Fred Astaire, Debbie Reynolds, Lilli Palmer, Tab Hunter | Comedy | Paramount; Golden Globe for Astaire |
| Pocketful of Miracles | Frank Capra | Bette Davis, Glenn Ford, Hope Lange, Arthur O'Connell, Thomas Mitchell, Peter Falk, Ann-Margret | Comedy | United Artists; Capra's final film; based on a story by Damon Runyon |
| Police Dog Story | Edward L. Cahn | James Brown, Merry Anders | Crime | United Artists |
| Portrait of a Mobster | Joseph Pevney | Vic Morrow, Leslie Parrish | Crime | Warner Bros. |
| Posse from Hell | Herbert Coleman | Audie Murphy, Lee Van Cleef, Vic Morrow | Western | Universal |
| The Purple Hills | Maury Dexter | Gene Nelson, Kent Taylor | Western | 20th Century Fox |
| Question 7 | Stuart Rosenberg | Michael Gwynn, Erik Schumann | Drama | Co-production with West Germany |
| A Raisin in the Sun | Daniel Petrie | Sidney Poitier, Ruby Dee | Drama | Columbia; based on Lorraine Hansberry play; remade in 2008 |
| Reptilicus | Sidney W. Pink | Carl Ottosen | Science fiction | Saga Studios; Danish-American production |
| Return to Peyton Place | José Ferrer | Carol Lynley, Jeff Chandler, Eleanor Parker | Drama | 20th Century Fox; sequel to Peyton Place |
| The Right Approach | David Butler | Frankie Vaughan, Martha Hyer, Juliet Prowse | Drama | 20th Century Fox |
| Ring of Fire | Andrew L. Stone | David Janssen, Joyce Taylor | Drama | MGM |
| Romanoff and Juliet | Peter Ustinov | John Gavin, Sandra Dee, Akim Tamiroff | Comedy | Universal |
| The Roman Spring of Mrs. Stone | Jose Quintero | Vivien Leigh, Warren Beatty | Drama | Warner Bros.; based on Tennessee Williams play |

== S–Z ==
| Title | Director | Cast | Genre | Note |
|---|---|---|---|---|
| Sail a Crooked Ship | Irving Brecher | Robert Wagner, Dolores Hart, Ernie Kovacs | Comedy | Columbia |
| Sanctuary | Tony Richardson | Lee Remick, Yves Montand | Drama | 20th Century Fox |
| The Second Time Around | Vincent Sherman | Debbie Reynolds, Steve Forrest, Andy Griffith | Comedy | 20th Century Fox |
| Secret of Deep Harbor | Edward L. Cahn | Ron Foster, Merry Anders | Thriller | United Artists |
| The Secret Ways | Phil Karlson | Richard Widmark, Sonja Ziemann | Thriller | Universal |
| The Sergeant Was a Lady | Bernard Glasser | Venetia Stevenson, Bill Williams | Comedy | Universal |
| Seven Women from Hell | Robert D. Webb | Patricia Owens, Denise Darcel, Yvonne Craig | Drama | 20th Century Fox |
| The Silent Call | John A. Bushelman | Gail Russell, David McLean | Drama | 20th Century Fox |
| The Sinister Urge | Ed Wood | Kenne Duncan, Jean Fontaine | Drama | Headliner Productions |
| The Sins of Rachel Cade | Gordon Douglas | Angie Dickinson, Peter Finch, Roger Moore | Drama | Warner Bros. |
| Sniper's Ridge | John A. Bushelman | Jack Ging, Stanley Clements | War | 20th Century Fox |
| Snow White and the Three Stooges | Walter Lang | The Three Stooges, Carol Heiss | Comedy | 20th Century Fox |
| Something Wild | Jack Garfein | Carroll Baker, Ralph Meeker | Drama | United Artists |
| Splendor in the Grass | Elia Kazan | Warren Beatty, Natalie Wood, Barbara Loden | Drama | Warner Bros.; Oscar for writer William Inge |
| Square of Violence | Leonardo Bercovici | Broderick Crawford, Valentina Cortese, Bibi Andersson | War | MGM |
| The Steel Claw | George Montgomery | George Montgomery | Action | Warner Bros. |
| Stop! Look! and Laugh! | Don Appell, Louis Brandt | The Three Stooges, Paul Winchell | Comedy | Columbia |
| Summer and Smoke | Peter Glenville | Laurence Harvey, Geraldine Page, Rita Moreno, Thomas Gomez, Una Merkel | Drama | Paramount; from play by Tennessee Williams; four Oscar nominations |
| Susan Slade | Delmer Daves | Troy Donahue, Connie Stevens, Dorothy McGuire | Drama | Warner Bros. |
| Swingin' Along | Charles Barton | Peter Marshall, Tommy Noonan, Barbara Eden | Comedy | 20th Century Fox |
| Tammy Tell Me True | Harry Keller | Sandra Dee, John Gavin | Romance | Universal; second film in Tammy series |
| Teenage Millionaire | Lawrence Doheny | Jimmy Clanton, Diane Jergens | Comedy | United Artists |
| Three Blondes in His Life | Leon Chooluck | Jock Mahoney, Greta Thyssen | Mystery | Golden Film Productions |
| A Thunder of Drums | Joseph M. Newman | Richard Boone, George Hamilton, Luana Patten | Western | MGM |
| Tomboy and the Champ | Francis D. Lyon | Candy Moore, Ben Johnson | Western | Universal |
| Too Late Blues | John Cassavetes | Bobby Darin, Stella Stevens | Drama | Paramount |
| Town Without Pity | Gottfried Reinhardt | Kirk Douglas, E. G. Marshall, Robert Blake | Drama | United Artists |
| Twenty Plus Two | Joseph M. Newman | David Janssen, Jeanne Crain, Dina Merrill | Drama | Allied Artists |
| Twist Around the Clock | Oscar Rudolph | Chubby Checker, Dion DiMucci | Musical | Columbia |
| The Two Little Bears | Randall Hood | Eddie Albert, Jane Wyatt | Comedy | 20th Century Fox |
| Two Loves | Charles Walters | Shirley MacLaine, Laurence Harvey | Romance | MGM |
| Two Rode Together | John Ford | James Stewart, Richard Widmark, Shirley Jones | Western | Columbia |
| Underworld U.S.A. | Samuel Fuller | Cliff Robertson, Beatrice Kay | Film noir | Columbia |
| Valley of the Dragons | Edward Bernds | Cesare Danova, Sean McClory, Joan Staley | Science fiction | Columbia |
| Voyage to the Bottom of the Sea | Irwin Allen | Walter Pidgeon, Joan Fontaine, Barbara Eden | Science fiction | 20th Century Fox; became TV series |
| Walk the Angry Beach | John Hayes | Rue McClanahan | Drama | |
| War Is Hell | Burt Topper | Audie Murphy, Judy Dan | War | Allied Artists |
| West Side Story | Robert Wise, Jerome Robbins | Richard Beymer, Natalie Wood, Rita Moreno, Russ Tamblyn, George Chakiris, Simon Oakland | Musical | United Artists; won 10 Oscars; based on stage musical and Romeo and Juliet |
| When the Clock Strikes | Edward L. Cahn | James Brown, Merry Anders | Crime | United Artists |
| Wild in the Country | Philip Dunne | Elvis Presley, Tuesday Weld, Hope Lange, Millie Perkins, John Ireland, Gary Lockwood | Drama | 20th Century Fox |
| Wings of Chance | Eddie Dew | James Brown, Frances Rafferty | Action | Universal |
| The Wizard of Baghdad | George Sherman | Dick Shawn, Diane Baker | Comedy | 20th Century Fox |
| X-15 | Richard Donner | Charles Bronson, Kenneth Tobey, David McLean, Mary Tyler Moore | Adventure | United Artists |
| You Have to Run Fast | Edward L. Cahn | Craig Hill, Grant Richards | Drama | United Artists |
| The Young Doctors | Phil Karlson | Ben Gazzara, Fredric March, Dick Clark | Drama | United Artists |
| The Young Savages | John Frankenheimer | Burt Lancaster, Dina Merrill, Shelley Winters | Drama | United Artists |

== See also ==
- List of 1961 box office number-one films in the United States
- AFI Catalog of Feature Films
- 1961 in the United States
