= Edward Small =

American film producer (1891–1977)

- Born: Edward Schmalheiser; February 1, 1891; New York City, US
- Died: January 25, 1977 (age 85); Los Angeles, California, US
- Occupation: Film producer
- Spouse: Elsie Wilson Small
- Children: 2

Edward Small (born Edward Schmalheiser, February 1, 1891 – January 25, 1977) was an American film producer from the late 1920s through 1970, who was enormously prolific over a 50-year career. He is best known for the movies The Count of Monte Cristo (1934), The Man in the Iron Mask (1939), The Corsican Brothers (1941), Brewster's Millions (1945), Raw Deal (1948), Black Magic (1949), Witness for the Prosecution (1957) and Solomon and Sheba (1959).

== Early life and career ==
Small was born on February 1, 1891, to a Jewish family in Brooklyn, the son of Rose (née Lewin) and Philip Schmalheiser. His mother was born in Prussia and his father was born in Austria; he had three sisters and two brothers. He began his career as a talent agent in New York City. In 1917, he moved his agency to Los Angeles where his acting clients included a young Hedda Hopper. His first production appears to have been the wartime propaganda film, Who's Your Neighbor? (1917).

In the 1920s the Edward Small Company produced stage sketches. He helped William Goetz begin his career in the industry by recommending him for a job at Corinne Griffith.

=== Asher Small Rogers ===
Small began producing films in the 1920s, when it became his full-time occupation. He formed the firm Asher, Small and Rogers, as a partner with Charles Rogers and E. M Asher. The partnerships early films were all based on plays: The Sporting Lover (1926), The Cohens and Kellys (1926) (which led to a lawsuit with the author of Abie's Irish Rose), The Gorilla (1927), McFadden's Flats (1927), and Ladies' Night in a Turkish Bath (1928).

Of these Cohens and Kellys was particularly popular, leading to a number of sequels starting with The Cohens and the Kellys in Paris (1928). Small also produced My Man (1928) with Fanny Brice, and Companionate Marriage (1929).

Except for The Gorilla all these early films were comedies. In 1926 Small said, "Making a comedy requires far more care than is necessary for any other form of screen production because audiences are more exacting than in any other form of entertainment."

"Picture making is a youngster's game", he added the same year. "When a man gets older he doesn't want to take a chance to try something new. And this business moves so fast that if you don't change your methods with every picture you're out of luck. In a few years I won't have a thing to do with the creative. Afraid, I'll hire young men with plenty of nerve to handle that for me."

In early 1928, the original Asher Small Rogers partnership dissolved. However they then re-teamed and started producing films; towards the end of the year they invested in a studio complex in Sherman Oaks.

Small then worked for a time at Columbia Pictures, making Song of Love (1929) with Belle Baker. For his own company he made Clancy in Wall Street (1930) starring Cohens and Kellys star Charles Murray.

Small sent an expedition to the Arctic and they made the documentary Igloo (1932).

== Reliance Pictures and United Artists ==
In 1932, Small formed Reliance Pictures together with partner Harry M. Goetz. The new company was to be made with finance from Art Cinema, a subsidiary company of United Artists, in a deal brokered by Joseph Schenck. On the basis of this verbal commitment, Small and Goetz started pre production on three films. However, when Schenck presented the deal to Art Cinema's board, it was turned down. An embarrassed Schenck decided personally put up half the cost of the three films, with the other half met by Small and Goetz.

The films were I Cover the Waterfront (1933), a crime drama based on a book with Claudette Colbert; Palooka (1934), a comedy based on the comic Joe Palooka with Jimmy Durante; and The Count of Monte Cristo (1934), a swashbuckler based on the Dumas novel starring Robert Donat and the first screen credit for Philip Dunne. Of the three Monte Cristo was an especially big hit and Small would go on to produce a number of swashbucklers.

William Phipps then stepped in to provide financing in Schenck's place and Reliance made five more movies for United Artists over two years: Transatlantic Merry-Go-Round (1934), a musical comedy; Let 'Em Have It (1935); a gangster movie; Red Salute (1935), a screwball comedy with an anti-Communist slant starring Barbara Stanwyck and Robert Young; The Melody Lingers On (1935), a melodrama; and Last of the Mohicans (1936), based on the classic novel, starring Randolph Scott and co-written by Dunne. The latter was a big hit.

In 1935, Small announced plans to make a series of 4,000-foot films (i.e. short features) based on short stories and novelettes as an alternative to the double bill but this did not seem to come to fruition.

=== RKO ===
After making The Last of the Mohicans, Small left United Artists and established himself as an associate producer at RKO in January 1936; the studio bought out Reliance.

Small said he was motivated to do this move in order to make larger budgeted movies, including Robber Barons (which became The Toast of New York), Son of Monte Cristo, Gunga Din and a series of Jack Oakie comedies. Small:

I intend to produce a different type of historical productions. There will be less of the awesomeness and less of the blind respect that has often marked the modern's approach to a historical character. Diamond Jim and The Story of Louis Pasteur are only the beginning. Napoleon, Marie Antoinette, and Mary of Scotland, contemplated, will be great steps in the direction of honesty. We have on our schedules the filming of the stories of Beau Brummell and Jim Fisk and we are contemplating a minimum of punch-pulling. Newsreels are telling the truth about people, showing them as they are. Feature pictures are going to do the same thing; they will make men and women out of celebrities.

Small's time at RKO resulted in six pictures: The Bride Walks Out (1936), a romantic comedy with Stanwyck and Young from Red Channels; We Who Are About to Die (1937), based on a true story about a man unjustly sent to prison; Sea Devils (1937), a military drama with Victor McLaglen; New Faces of 1937 (1937), a musical revue designed to introduce new talent such as Milton Berle; Super-Sleuth (1937) with Jack Oakie; and The Toast of New York (1937), a biopic of James Fisk starring Edward Arnold, Cary Grant and Frances Farmer.

Some of these performed well, notably The Bride Walks Out but others were less successful, particularly New Faces of 1937 and the expensive The Toast of New York, which was RKO's biggest money losing picture of 1937.

However Small did sell the studio his rights to Gunga Din which he had purchased from the Rudyard Kipling estate in 1936 and became a big hit later on. (He made Son of Cristo later at United Artists and never produced a Beau Brummel film.) Small departed from RKO in 1938.

== Edward Small Productions ==
In January 1938, Small returned to United Artists with his own unit, Edward Small Productions, under a three-year deal to make six films a year. At that time Small lived in Palm Springs, California,

The following year he announced plans to make seven films worth $5 million over the next 12 months. Plans for some of these were delayed due to the war in Europe but he made most of them, starting with The Duke of West Point (1938), which starred Louis Hayward who Small put under a long-term contract.

This was followed by King of the Turf (1939), a horse racing film with Adolphe Menjou. Small returned to swashbucklers with another adaptation of a Dumas novel, The Man in the Iron Mask (1939), starring Hayward; this was one of Small's most popular films.

Small bought the Howard Spring novel My Son, My Son! to turn into a film with Hayward. He also put Heyward into another swashbuckler, The Son of Monte Cristo (1940), a sequel to his 1934 hit, co-starring Joan Bennett.

Small borrowed Jon Hall to star in two films: South of Pago Pago (1940), a South Sea island movie, with Victor McLaglen and Frances Farmer, and Kit Carson (1940), a Western.

In 1940, Small stopped making movies for six months as he renegotiated his deal with United Artists. He spoke out against rising costs and the impact of the double bill on filmmakers.

He recommenced production in early 1941 with another popular swashbuckler, an adaptation of The Corsican Brothers, starring Douglas Fairbanks Jr. He made five more movies for United Artists – International Lady (1941), a war time spy movie with George Brent; A Gentleman After Dark (1942), a crime drama with Brian Donlevy; Twin Beds (1942), a comedy based on an often-filmed stage play with Brent and Bennett; Friendly Enemies (1942), a wartime drama; and Miss Annie Rooney (1942), a film notable for featuring the first screen kiss of Shirley Temple but a big flop.

In March 1942 Small threatened to strike again due to unhappiness with his deal.

=== Allan Dwan Farces ===
Small and United Artists managed to come to terms and he produced a fresh series, including a series of farces directed by Allan Dwan and starring Dennis O'Keefe: Up in Mabel's Room (1944), based on a stage farce; Abroad with Two Yanks (1944), a wartime story set in Australia with William Bendix; Brewster's Millions (1945), based on the often-filmed novel; and Getting Gertie's Garter (1945), based on the stage play.

In June 1945, he announced a plan to make ten films worth $10 million but he could not come to terms with United Artists and ended up leaving the studio that year.

In 1942, Small invested in the play Sweet Charity. In 1944, Binnie Barnes sued Edward Small Productions claiming they had breached a promise to build her up into a star.

=== Columbia and Eagle-Lion ===
Edward Small made his next film for Universal-International, Temptation (1946), starring Merle Oberon and George Brent.

He also produced The Return of Monte Cristo for Columbia, with Hayward; then in mid-1946 signed another deal with United Artists. For them he made Black Magic (1949), a film with Orson Welles which was shot in Rome.

In the late 1940s, Small moved over to Eagle-Lion where he made the popular film noirs T-Men (1947), and Raw Deal (1948), both starring Dennis O'Keefe and directed by Anthony Mann.

For a time there was talk Small would take over Eagle Lion. However Small fell out with the studio over billing on T Men and withdrew from his planned participation in the film Twelve Against the Underworld. He later argued that the company could not guarantee funding for a three-year schedule.

In 1948, Small said he had personally made $2 million in profit from ten films over the past 18 months. He was making 16 films worth $8.5 million. However, he was not optimistic about the future of independent film production, saying that filmmakers needed to look internationally.

He made a series of films for Columbia: The Black Arrow (1948), a swashbuckler based on a classic Robert Louis Stevenson novel with Hayward; The Fuller Brush Man (1948), a comedy with Red Skelton who Small borrowed from MGM; Walk a Crooked Mile (1948), a crime noir with O'Keefe and Hayward.

=== Columbia Pictures ===
In 1949, Small signed a two-year contract with Columbia Pictures, which specifically excluded Small's long-gestating film about Rudolph Valentino, Valentino. He ended up making eleven films for the studio over seven years where Columbia allowed him profit sharing after Columbia made up their investment in the film.

In 1947, Reliance Pictures, headed by Small's son Bernard and Ben Pivar, signed an agreement with 20th Century Fox to release six films starting with Strange Penalty, based on the story Lady from Shanghai, starring Alan Curtis and directed by Jean Yarbrough. They later made The Creeper (1948), two Bulldog Drummonds and The Indian Scout. They also developed a series of action films based on Leatherstocking Tales plus the films The Challenge, 13 Lead Soldiers, Santa Fe Uprising, Killers of the Sea, and The Cat Man.

Small returned to United Artists to make two Westerns with actor George Montgomery, Davy Crockett, Indian Scout (1950), using footage from Kit Carson, and The Iroquois Trail (1950), based on the novel Last of the Mohicans.

Valentino (1951), which Small had developed since 1938, was released through Columbia. Starring Anthony Dexter, it was a box-office flop.

His other Columbia films included Lorna Doone (1951), another swashbuckler based on a classic novel, directed by Phil Karlson and starring Richard Greene. He made some Westerns with George Montgomery, The Texas Rangers (1951), Indian Uprising (1951) and Cripple Creek (1952).

Small also produced two films directed by Karlson: Scandal Sheet (1952) from a novel by Sam Fuller; and The Brigand (1952), a swashbuckler starring Valentinos Anthony Dexter.

=== Return to United Artists ===
In 1951, Small helped fund Arthur Krim and Bob Benjamin acquire 50% of UA. He then signed a contract to make thirteen more movies for that company, ten within the first year, starting with Kansas City Confidential. This deal ultimately resulted in over seventy films over the next ten years. During this time he would occasionally make movies for other studios as well but United Artists were his main distributor. David Picker, head of the production for UA, later wrote that "I counted 76 films that Eddie made for the company simply because he was there to start it all. Now that's loyalty."

Most of Small's UA movies were budgeted between $100,000 and $300,000, and were not expected to make large profits on theatrical release but stood to earn considerable money being sold to television. They were usually shot within seven to nine days and went for around seventy minutes, starring lesser ranked names who were paid around $25,000. The majority were Westerns and crime melodramas (in contrast with his Columbia Films, which were mostly swashbucklers); towards the end of the 1950s he also increasingly made films aimed at the teenage market. The rise in television saw the market for these films die out in the early 1960s.

In order to supply his product, Small operated a number of companies during this period: Fame Productions, Theme Pictures, Motion Picture Investors, Associated Players & Producers, Superior Pictures Inc., Eclipse Productions, Imperial Pictures, Global Productions, and World Films.

He would assign his films to other producers such as Aubrey Wisberg; in 1953 he had a six-picture deal with the team of Clarence Greene and Russell Rouse which later became a 12-picture deal. His most prolific producer was Robert E. Kent for such companies as Peerless and Vogue.

His UA films included Kansas City Confidential (1952), a noir starring John Payne and directed by Karlson which proved popular and led to a series of films with Confidential in the title.

Small remade The Corsican Brothers as The Bandits of Corsica (1952), with Richard Greene, and helped finance two swashbucklers with Dexter, Captain John Smith and Pocahontas (1953) and Captain Kidd and the Slave Girl (1954). He also helped make Dragon's Gold (1953) and The Neanderthal Man (1953).

Small made Westerns with Montgomery, Gun Belt (1953), with Tab Hunter, The Lone Gun (1954), Gun Duel in Durango (1956) and Toughest Gun in Tombstone (1958). He also did Westerns with Jock Mahoney (Overland Pacific (1954)), Rod Cameron (Southwest Passage (1954)), Sterling Hayden (Top Gun (1955), The Iron Sheriff (1957)), and Buster Crabbe (Gun Brothers (1956), Gunfighters of Abilene (1960)), Jim Davis (Noose for a Gunman (1960), Frontier Uprising (1961), The Gambler Wore a Gun (1961)), Bill Williams (Oklahoma Territory (1960)) and James Brown (Five Guns to Tombstone (1960), Gun Fight (1961), Gun Street (1962)). He made a children's Western, A Dog's Best Friend (1960).

Small was reunited with Karlson and Payne for 99 River Street (1953) and he put Payne in a swashbuckler, Raiders of the Seven Seas (1953).

Small helped finance some war films, Sabre Jet (1954) and The Steel Lady (1954) (with Hunter), and the noir Wicked Woman (1953). He did Khyber Patrol (1954) with Richard Egan and Return to Treasure Island (1954) with Hunter.

He made some noirs with Broderick Crawford, Down Three Dark Streets (1954) and New York Confidential (1955), and did a noir with Farley Granger, The Naked Street (1955). His other crime films included Chicago Confidential (1957), 5 Steps to Danger (1957), Hong Kong Confidential (1958), Guns Girls and Gangsters (1959), Inside the Mafia (1959), Pier 5, Havana (1959), Riot in Juvenile Prison (1960), Vice Raid (1960), Cage of Evil (1960), The Music Box Kid (1960), Three Came to Kill (1960), The Walking Target (1960), Boy Who Caught a Crook (1961), and The Cat Burglar (1961), The Police Dog Story (1961), Secret of Deep Harbor (1961, a remake of I Cover the Waterfront), When the Clock Strikes (1961), You Have to Run Fast (1961), Deadly Duo (1962), Incident in an Alley (1962)

Small also financed some science fiction and horror films: UFO (1956), Curse of the Faceless Man (1957), It! The Terror from Beyond Space (1958), The Four Skulls of Jonathan Drake (1959), Invisible Invaders (1959), The Flight That Disappeared (1960).

He made some war films: Timbuktu (1959), a tale of the Foreign Legion that he took his name off and Operation Bottleneck (1961).

Small also made some movies for younger children: Beauty and the Beast (1962), The Clown and the Kid (1961), and Jack the Giant Killer (1962), and a drama, Saintly Sinners (1962).

In 1964 Small provided funding for and was a silent partner in Grant Whytock's Admiral Pictures that produced Audie Murphy westerns for Columbia. Whytock had a long career editing many of Small's films and being credited as a producer or associate producer on several of them.

==== Larger budgeted films ====
Small occasionally made large budgeted films, usually in partnership with other producers. These included Monkey on My Back (1957) a biopic about Barney Ross that ran into censorship trouble.

There was also Witness for the Prosecution (1957) directed by Billy Wilder; Solomon and Sheba (1959) originally with Tyrone Power who died during filming.

=== Television ===
In 1950, Small sold a package of 26 films he produced to show on American television through his Peerless Television Productions.

In 1953, he bought 50% of Arrow Productions.

Small later served as chairman of the board of the TV distribution company Television Programs of America whose shows include Private Secretary, Fury, 'Captain Gallant of the Foreign Legion, Hawkeye and the Last of the Mohicans, Halls of Ivy and 'Ramar of the Jungle. In 1957, he sold his interest in the company for $1.5 million.

=== British productions ===
In the late 1950s and early 1960s, Small made a number of films in the UK. He made several low-budget comedies and horror films, including several directed by Sidney J. Furie: Doctor Blood's Coffin (1961), The Snake Woman (1961) and Three on a Spree (1961, a remake of Brewster's Millions). He also produced a comedy, Mary Had a Little... (1961).

More prestigious was The Greengage Summer (1962) directed by Lewis Gilbert. Small did three horror films with Vincent Price, Tower of London (1962) with Roger Corman; Diary of a Madman (1963); and Twice-Told Tales (1963).

=== Other films ===
In the mid to late 1960s, Small cut back on his output and concentrated on making comedies with Bob Hope, such as I'll Take Sweden (1965) and Boy, Did I Get a Wrong Number! (1966). He made Frankie and Johnny (1966) with Elvis Presley and the comedy The Wicked Dreams of Paula Schultz (1968) with Elke Sommer.

The File of the Golden Goose (1968) was a thriller, a remake of T-Men.

In 1970, Small announced he had two television series and four films ready for production but only one was made, The Christine Jorgensen Story (1970), which was Small's final movie.

In 1973, director Phil Karlson, who made eight films for Small, called him "probably, in his field – and he made some very good films – the most successful producer in our entire industry. Financially, no doubt about it.The man is a multi-millionaire."

He has a star on the Hollywood Walk of Fame for his television work located at 1501 Vine Street. His mausoleum is at Hollywood Forever Cemetery in Los Angeles.

== Select filmography ==
- Who's Your Neighbor? (1917)
- The Sporting Lover (1926) (ASR/FN)
- The Cohens and Kellys (1926) (Universal)
- The Gorilla (1927) (ASR/FN)
- McFadden's Flats (1927) (ASR/FN)
- Ladies' Night in a Turkish Bath (1928)(ASR/FN)
- The Cohens and the Kellys in Paris (1928) (Universal)
- My Man (1928) (Warner Bros)
- Companionate Marriage (1928)(ASR/FN)
- Song of Love (1929) (Columbia)
- Clancy in Wall Street (1930) (ES)
- Igloo (1932) (ES/Universal)
- I Cover the Waterfront (1933) (R/UA)
- Palooka (1933) (R/UA)
- The Count of Monte Cristo (1934) (R/UA)
- Transatlantic Merry-Go-Round (1934) (R/UA)
- The Legion of Valour (1935) (R/UA)
- Red Salute (1935) (R/UA)
- The Melody Lingers On (1935) (R/UA)
- The Last of the Mohicans (1936) (R/UA)
- The Bride Walks Out (1936) (RKO)
- We Who Are About to Die (1937) (RKO)
- Sea Devils (1937) (RKO)
- New Faces of 1937 (1937) (RKO)
- Super-Sleuth (1937) (RKO)
- The Toast of New York (1937) (RKO)
- The Duke of West Point (1938) (ES/UA)
- King of the Turf (1939) (ES/UA)
- The Man in the Iron Mask (1939) (ES/UA)
- My Son, My Son! (1940) (ES/UA)
- The Son of Monte Cristo (1940) (ES/UA)
- South of Pago Pago (1940) (ES/UA)
- Kit Carson (1940) (ES/UA)
- International Lady (1941) (ES/UA)
- Pimpernel Smith (1941) (UA) (US distributor)
- The Corsican Brothers (1941) (ES/UA)
- A Gentleman After Dark (1942) (ES/UA)
- Twin Beds (1942) (ES/UA)
- Miss Annie Rooney (1942) (ES/UA)
- Friendly Enemies (1942) (ES/UA)
- The Foreman Went to France (1943) (US distributor)
- Up in Mabel's Room (1944) (ES/UA)
- Abroad with Two Yanks (1944) (ES/UA)
- Brewster's Millions (1945) (ES/UA)
- Getting Gertie's Garter (1945) (ES/UA)
- Temptation (1946) (Universal)
- The Return of Monte Cristo (1946) (ES/C)
- T-Men (1947) (ES/EL)
- The Black Arrow (1948) (ES/C)
- The Fuller Brush Man (1948) (ES/C)
- Raw Deal (1948) (ES/EL)
- Walk a Crooked Mile (1948) (ES/C)
- Black Magic (1949) (ES/UA)
- Davy Crockett, Indian Scout (1950) (ES/UA)
- The Iroquois Trail (1950) (ES/UA)
- Valentino (1951) (ES/C)
- Lorna Doone (1951) (ES/C)
- The Texas Rangers (1951) (ES/C)
- Indian Uprising (1952)
- Scandal Sheet (1952) (C)
- The Brigand (1952) (Motion Picture Investors/C)
- Cripple Creek (1952)
- Kansas City Confidential (1952) (Assoc Players/UA)
- Bandits of Corsica (1953) (Global/UA)
- Captain John Smith and Pocahontas (1953) (R/UA)
- Dragon's Gold (1953) (WSP/UA)
- Gun Belt (1953) (G/UA)
- The Neanderthal Man (1953) (G/UA)
- 99 River Street (1953) (ES/UA)
- Raiders of the Seven Seas (1953) (G/UA)
- Sabre Jet (1953) (UA)
- The Steel Lady (1953) (W/UA)
- Wicked Woman (1953) (ES/UA)
- Captain Kidd and the Slave Girl (1954) (W/UA)
- Khyber Patrol (1954) (W/UA)
- The Lone Gun (1954) (W/UA)
- Overland Pacific (1954) (R/UA)
- Return to Treasure Island (1954) (R/UA)
- Southwest Passage (1954) (ES/UA)
- Down Three Dark Streets (ES/1954)
- New York Confidential (1955) (Warners)
- The Naked Street (1955) (W/UA)
- Top Gun (1955) (Fame/UA)
- Comanche (1955) (Carl Krueger/UA)
- Gun Brothers (1956) (Grand/UA)
- UFO (1956) (Ivar/UA)
- Chicago Confidential (1957) (Peerless/UA)
- Five Steps to Danger (1957) (Grand/UA)
- Gun Duel in Durango (1957) (Peerless/UA)
- The Iron Sheriff (1957) (Grand/UA)
- Monkey on My Back (1957) (Imperial/UA)
- Curse of the Faceless Man (1958) (RKP/UA)
- Hong Kong Confidential (1958) (V/UA)
- It! The Terror from Beyond Space (1958) (V/UA)
- Toughest Gun in Tombstone (1958) (Peerless/UA)
- Witness for the Prosecution (1958) (ES/UA)
- The Four Skulls of Jonathan Drake (1959) (Premium/UA)
- Guns, Girls, and Gangsters (1959) (Imperial/UA)
- Inside the Mafia (1959) (Preimum/UA)
- Invisible Invaders (1959) (PremiumUA)
- Pier 5, Havana (1959) (REK/UA)
- Riot in Juvenile Prison (1959) (V/UA)
- Solomon and Sheba (1959) (ES/UA)
- Timbuktu (1959) (had name removed from credits) (I/UA)
- Vice Raid (1959) (I/UA)
- Cage of Evil (1960) (Z/UA)
- Dog's Best Friend (1960) (UA)
- Gunfighters of Abilene (1960) (Z/UA)
- The Music Box Kid (1960) (Premium/UA)
- Noose for a Gunman (1960) (Premium/UA)
- Oklahoma Territory (1960) (Premium/UA)
- Three Came to Kill (1960) (Premium/UA)
- The Walking Target (1960) (Z/UA)
- Boy Who Caught a Crook (1961) (HF/UA)
- The Cat Burglar (1961) (HF/UA)
- Doctor Blood's Coffin (1961) (CP/UA)
- Frontier Uprising (1961) (Z/UA)
- Five Guns to Tombstone (1961) (Z/UA)
- The Flight that Disappeared (1961) (HF/UA)
- The Gambler Wore a Gun (1961) (Z/UA)
- Gun Fight (1961) (Z/UA)
- Mary Had a Little... (1961) (CP/UA)
- Operation Bottleneck (1961) (Z/UA)
- Police Dog Story (1961) (Z/UA)
- Secret of Deep Harbor (1961) (HF/UA)
- The Snake Woman (1961) (CP/UA)
- Three on a Spree (1961) (CP/UA)
- When the Clock Strikes (1961) (HF/UA)
- You Have to Run Fast (1961) (HF/UA)
- The Greengage Summer (1961) (PKL/Columbia)
- Beauty and the Beast (1962) (HF/UA)
- The Clown and the Kid (1962) (HF/UA)
- Deadly Duo (1962) (HF/UA)
- Gun Street (1962) (HF/UA)
- Incident in an Alley (1962) (HF/UA)
- Jack the Giant Killer (1962) (Z/UA)
- Saintly Sinners (1962) (HF/UA)
- Tower of London (1962) (Admiral/UA)
- Diary of a Madman (1963) (Admiral/UA)
- Twice Told Tales (1963) (Admiral/UA)
- I'll Take Sweden (1965) (ES/UA)
- Boy, Did I Get a Wrong Number! (1966) (ES/UA)
- Frankie and Johnny (1966) (UA)
- The Wicked Dreams of Paula Schultz (1968) (ES/UA)
- The File of the Golden Goose (1969) (CP/UA)
- The Christine Jorgensen Story (1970) (Eprod/UA)

- ASR = Asher Small Rogers
- C = Columbia
- CP = Caralan Productions
- ES = Edward Small Productions
- FN = First National
- HF = Harvard Film Corporation
- R = Reliance
- UA = United Artists
- Z = Zenith Pictures

=== Unmade films ===
- The Painted Face by Bayard Veiller (1928)
- The Broadway Melody (1929)
- first talking movie for Nazimova (1929)
- Sojourn (1930)
- The Cradle of Jazz (1929) directed by Ted Wilde – stopped by Wilde's death from an old war wound in 1929 while directing a play for Small
- sequel to McFadden's Flats (1929)
- Mayor Harding of New York (1932) – abandoned after protests
- Style (1932) from a story by Adela Harland set in the fashion industry to star Lilyan Tashman
- If Christ Came to Chicago (1933)
- Mr Helen Green (1933)
- untitled film with Lawrence Tibbett – cancelled because Tibbett insisted on story and cast approval
- Beau Brummell (1934) with Robert Donat
- Lusitania (1935)
- Amateur Girl (1935) with Constance Cummings and Robert Young
- David Garrick (1935)
- The Mark of Zorro (1935) – later (1953) with Anthony Dexter|* Yosesmite (1935) – Western from script by Philip Dunne
- Robin Hood (1935) with Robert Donat
- adaptation of The Beggar's Opera (1935)
- Clementina (1936)
- The Lost World, Two Orphans and College Carnival (1938) – for United Artists
- Beach Boy (1938) with Jon Hall|* The Maginot Line (1938) with Louis Hayward
- The Legend of Sleepy Hollow (1939)
- adaptation of Food of the Gods (1939)
- Quantrill the Radier (1939)
- By Any Other Name (1939) – play by Warren Musell about Edward de Vere, the Earl of Oxford
- Christopher Columbus (1940–46)
- Attack (1940) from a script by George Bruce about war maneuvers
- Le Grande Homme (1940) starring Jack Oakie by David Dousseau
- Heels to the Sky (1941) – a story of an American in the RAF
- My Official Wife by Ernest Vajda, Sabotage, She Was a Working Girl (1941)
- The Docks of New York (1941)
- Winter Soldiers (1942)
- Clementina by A. E. W. Mason (1942)
- When Knighthood Was in Flower (1942)
- But Is It Love (1942) with Carole Lombard
- The Raft (1943) with William Bendix
- The Guy from Mike's Place (1943)
- The Notorious Nancy Gray (1943)
- Big Time (1943) with Ed Wynn
- remake of Two Arabian Knights (1944) with Dennis O'Keefe and William Bendix
- remake of Are You a Mason? (1944)
- When the Cat's Away (1944)
- Two Yanks in Paris (1945) – sequel to Abroad with Two Yanks
- A Time to be Born (1945) from book by Dawn Powell
- Lucretia Borgia (1945)
- D'Artagnan (1945)
- adaptation of The Scarlet Letter (1946)
- Kate Fennigate (1946) from novel by Booth Tarkington
- The O'Flynn (1946)
- The Treasure of Monte Cristo (1948)
- Twelve Against the Underworld (1948) for Eagle-Lion
- Crime on the Waterfront (1948) based on a series of newspaper articles
- The Los Angeles Story (1948) based on a script by Philip Yordan
- remake of The Sheik (1950)
- Far West (1953) with producer Arthur Hornblow written by Sonya Levien
- Cannibal Island (1953) a historical adventure tale with Lex Barker
- The Mad Magician (1953)
- Hercules (1953) with Lex Barker
- The Unseen Hand (1953)
- The Last Notch (1954) based on script by John Gilroy
- The Brass Ring (1954)
- Dateline Indo China (1954) with Denise Darcel
- film about a female Pinkerton detective
- If I Can't Have You (1955) with Andrew Stone
- Women Confidential (1957) by Lee Mortimer
- adaptation of Agatha Christie's The Mousetrap (1958) with Victor Saville
- Dear Spy, adaptation of novel Legacy of a Spy (1959) with script by Norman Krasna
- Sgt Pike (1960) a Western with about a Southerner fighting for the North – mentioned at times for John Wayne, Gary Cooper and Charlton Heston
- 36-26-36 (1965) – an original script by John Helmer
- The Shameless Virgin (1968) with Elke Sommer from a script by Nat Perrin

=== Films developed by Small made by others ===
- Gunga Din (1939)
- The Shanghai Gesture (1941)
- Two Years Before the Mast (1946)
