= Gun Fight (film) =

1961 film by Edward L. Cahn

- Film poster
- Directed by: Edward L. Cahn
- Written by: Richard Schayer; Gerald Drayson Adams
- Based on: story by Gerald Drayson Adams
- Produced by: Edward Small (executive); Robert E. Kent
- Starring: James Brown; Joan Staley; Gregg Palmer
- Cinematography: Walter Strenge
- Edited by: Robert Carlisle
- Music by: Paul Sawtell; Bert Shefter
- Production company: Zenith Pictures
- Distributed by: United Artists
- Release date: 1 May 1961
- Running time: 67 mins
- Country: USA
- Language: English

Gun Fight is a 1961 Western directed by Edward L. Cahn for Robert E. Kent's Zenith Productions that was released through United Artists. The film features location shots from the Grand Teton National Park. Gun Fight is an almost identical remake of the 1956 film Gun Brothers starring Buster Crabbe and Neville Brand.

== Plot ==
First Sergeant Wayne Santley has finished his final enlistment with the 7th Cavalry and is looking forward to going into business with his brother Brad in Wyoming who has told him he has a large ranch with 2,000 head of cattle. He discovers that his brother and his associates are in a much different kind of business that Wayne wants no part of.

== Cast ==
- James Brown as Wayne Santley
- Joan Staley as Nora Blaine
- Gregg Palmer as Brad Santley
- Ron Soble as Pawnee
- Ken Mayer as Joe Emery
- Walter Coy as Sheriff
- James Parnell as Moose McLain

== See also ==
- List of American films of 1961
