= Police Dog Story =

1961 film by Edward L. Cahn

- Directed by: Edward L. Cahn
- Written by: Orville H. Hampton
- Produced by: Robert E. Kent
- Starring: James Brown; Merry Anders
- Cinematography: Maury Gertsman
- Edited by: Arthur Hilton (as Arthur D. Hilton); Michael Minth (as Michael J. Minth)
- Music by: Paul Sawtell; Bert Shefter
- Color process: Black and white
- Production company: Zenith Pictures
- Distributed by: United Artists
- Release date: February 1961
- Running time: 62 minutes
- Country: United States
- Language: English

Police Dog Story is a 1961 American crime film directed by Edward L. Cahn and starring James Brown and Merry Anders.

== Plot ==
After exhaustive training, a police dog joins an arson investigation.

== Cast ==
- James Brown as Norm Edwards
- Merry Anders as Terry Dayton
- Barry Kelley as Bert Dana
- Milton Frome as Todd Wellman
- Vinton Hayworth as Commissioner
- Francis De Sales as Capt. Dietrich
- Brad Trumbull as Bill Frye
- Pat McCaffrie as Keith Early

== See also ==
- List of American films of 1961
