= When the Clock Strikes =

1961 film by Edward L. Cahn

- Directed by: Edward L. Cahn
- Written by: Dallas Gaultois
- Produced by: Edward Small (executive); Robert E. Kent
- Starring: James Brown; Merry Anders
- Cinematography: Kenneth Peach
- Edited by: Robert Carlisle
- Music by: Richard LaSalle
- Production company: Harvard Film Corporation
- Distributed by: United Artists
- Release date: June 10, 1961
- Running time: 72 minutes
- Country: United States
- Language: English

When the Clock Strikes is a 1961 gangster film directed by Edward L. Cahn and starring James Brown and Merry Anders.

== Plot ==
James Brown is at Henry Corden's lodge near the state prison, where they're hanging a man on his testimony. Brown is an honest man, and his identification was not certain, and he said so. But it hanged the man, and now another has confessed. Brown meets Merry Anders, the dead man's widow at the lodge, who's looking for a clue towards $160,000 he stole from a bank.

== Cast ==
- James Brown as Sam Morgan
- Merry Anders as Ellie
- Henry Corden as Cady
- Roy Barcroft as Sheriff Mitchell
- Peggy Stewart as Mrs. Pierce
- Frances De Sales as Warden
- Jorge Moreno as Martinez
- Max Mellinger as Postman
- Eden Hartford as Waitress
- Jack Kenney as Cafe Proprietor

== See also ==
- List of American films of 1961
