= Francis DeSales =

American film and television actor (1912–1988)

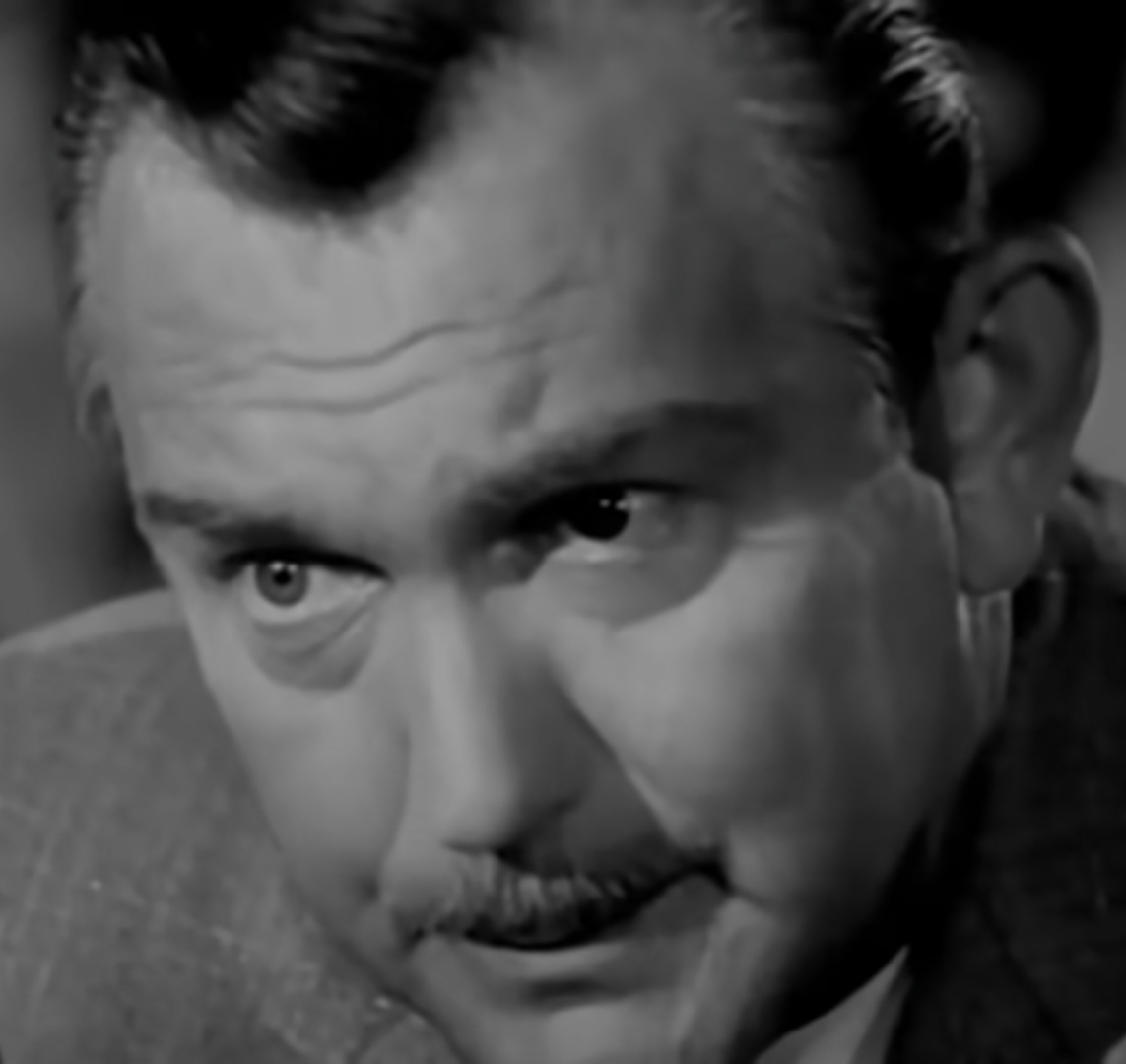
- DeSales in an episode of One Step Beyond (1960)
- Born: March 23, 1912; Philadelphia, U.S.
- Died: September 25, 1988 (aged 76); Van Nuys, California, U.S.
- Resting place: Queen of Heaven Cemetery, Rowland Heights, California
- Occupation: Actor
- Years active: 1950–1978

Francis DeSales (March 23, 1912 – September 25, 1988) was an American actor known for playing Harold Faller in The Big Story, Sheriff Maddox in Two Faces West, and Ralph Dobson in The Adventures of Ozzie and Harriet.

== Biography ==
Born in Philadelphia, DeSales was survived by his wife Doris when he died of cancer at his home in Van Nuys at the age of 76. DeSales is interred in Queen of Heaven Cemetery in Rowland Heights, California.

== Film roles ==
- Mr. and Mrs. North (1954, TV Series) - Lieutenant Bill Weigan
- Headline Hunters (1955) - Tribune Reporter (uncredited)
- Alfred Hitchcock Presents (1956) (Season 2 Episode 9: Crack of Doom") - Card Player
- Terror at Midnight (1956) - Police Lieutenant Conway
- The Girl He Left Behind (1956) - Army Psychiatrist (uncredited)
- Leave It to Beaver (1957) (Season 1 Episode 7) "Water, Anyone?) - Mr. Anderson
- All Mine to Give (1957) - Mr. Stephens
- The Unholy Wife (1957) - John Hayward, Defense Attorney (uncredited)
- Portland Exposé (1957) - Alfred Grey (uncredited)
- The Wayward Girl (1957) - Investigator Butler
- Jailhouse Rock (1957) - Surgeon (uncredited)
- The Hard Man (1957) - Captain Peters (uncredited)
- Return to Warbow (1958) - Sheriff (uncredited)
- Darby's Rangers (1958) - Captain (uncredited)
- Too Much, Too Soon (1958) - Imperial Pictures Executive (uncredited)
- The Lineup (1958) - Chester McPhee (uncredited)
- The High Cost of Loving (1958) - Charles Blake (uncredited)
- No Time for Sergeants (1958) - Sergeant T.C. Payne (uncredited)
- Apache Territory (1958) - Sergeant Sheehan
- Senior Prom (1958) - Carter Breed
- Revolt in the Big House (1958) - Chief of Detectives (uncredited)
- Perry Mason (1959) (Season 2, Episode 16: "The Case of the Fraudulent Photo") - George Fairbanks
- Up Periscope (1959) - Captain Quinn (uncredited)
- Face of a Fugitive (1959) - Deputy Sheriff George Allison
- It Started with a Kiss (1959) - Car Company Representative (uncredited)
- Operation Petticoat (1959) - Captain Kress (uncredited)
- Psycho (1960) - Deputy District Attorney Alan Deats (uncredited)
- Sunrise at Campobello (1960) - Riley (uncredited)
- Let No Man Write My Epitaph (1960) - Night Court Magistrate
- A Fever in the Blood (1961) - Conventioneer (uncredited)
- The Police Dog Story (1961) - Captain Dietrich
- When the Clock Strikes (1961) - Warden
- The Honeymoon Machine (1961) - U.S. Senator (uncredited)
- The Flight that Disappeared (1961) - George Manson (uncredited)
- A Majority of One (1961) - American Embassy Representative
- The Alfred Hitchcock Hour (1964) (Season 2 Episode 14: "Beyond the Sea of Death") - Lieutenant Farrell
- A Global Affair (1964) - U.S. Delegate (uncredited)
- Kisses for My President (1964) - Reporter (uncredited)
- The Third Day (1965) - Sanford - Board Member (uncredited)
- The Plainsman (1966) - Gambler (uncredited)
- Sweet November (1968) - Armstrong
- The Arrangement (1969) - Presentation Executive (uncredited)
- Tora! Tora! Tora! (1970) - Captain Arthur H. McCollum - Wilkinson's Subordinate with Stark (uncredited)
- Conquest of the Planet of the Apes (1972) - Auction Attendee (uncredited)
- The Outfit (1973) - Jim
- The Strongest Man in the World (1975) - Regent (uncredited)
- Moving Violation (1976) - Lawyer
- Rabbit Test (1978) - Cardinal (final film role)
