= Three Came to Kill =

1960 film by Edward L. Cahn

- Original theatrical poster
- Directed by: Edward L. Cahn
- Written by: James B. Gordon
- Based on: story by Orville H. Hampton
- Produced by: Robert E. Kent
- Starring: Cameron Mitchell; John Lupton
- Cinematography: Maury Gertsman
- Edited by: James Blakeley; Grant Whytock
- Music by: Paul Sawtell; Bert Shefter
- Production company: Robert E. Kent Productions
- Distributed by: United Artists
- Release date: March 1960 (United States)
- Running time: 71 minutes
- Country: United States
- Language: English

Three Came to Kill is a 1960 American crime thriller film directed by Edward L. Cahn and starring Cameron Mitchell and John Lupton. The plot concerns an assassination attempt on a foreign prime minister.

== Plot ==
Marty Brill's (Cameron Mitchell) Los Angeles gang plot to assassinate visiting Asian Prime Minister Gourem-Nara (Frank Lackteen). They break into the home of airport flight controller Hal Parker (John Lupton) and hold his family hostage. Brill threatens to kill Parker's wife June (Lyn Thomas), unless he broadcasts a coded message to identify which plane taking off from the airport is the premier's. They then plot to shoot the plane down. Meanwhile, special agents Ben Scanlon (Paul Langton) and Ray Maguire (Logan Field) close in on the gang.

== Cast ==
- Marty Brill – Cameron Mitchell
- Hal Parker – John Lupton
- Dave Harris – Steve Brodie
- June Parker – Lyn Thomas
- Ben Scanlon – Paul Langton
- Ipara – Jan Arvan
- Ray Maguire – Logan Field
- Police Chief Thomas Barrett – King Calder
- Betty – Jean Ingram
- Herb – Ron Foster
- Ex-Premier Gourem-Nara of Kharem – Frank Lackteen

== Reception ==
TV Guide called it a "choppily edited thriller redolent of so many others"; while DVD Talk called it "a tautly-told, intriguing little story perfectly suited to its limited budget. Though a bit flamboyant, Cameron Mitchell is excellent in the leading role, and like other Kent/Hampton/Cahn collaborations the climax is violent and action-packed."

== See also ==
- Inside the Mafia (1959) – A similar film by Edward L. Cahn with Cameron Mitchell
- List of American films of 1960
