= The Corsican Brothers (1941 film) =

1941 film directed by Gregory Ratoff

- Directed by: Gregory Ratoff
- Written by: George Bruce; Howard Estabrook
- Based on: Les frères Corses (The Corsican Brothers); 1841 novel by Alexandre Dumas, père
- Produced by: Edward Small
- Starring: Douglas Fairbanks Jr. Ruth Warrick; Akim Tamiroff
- Cinematography: Harry Stradling Sr.
- Edited by: William F. Claxton and Grant Whytock
- Music by: Dimitri Tiomkin
- Production company: Edward Small Productions
- Distributed by: United Artists
- Release dates: November 28, 1941 (United States); December 18, 1941 (Washington, D.C.)
- Running time: 111 minutes
- Country: United States
- Language: English
- Box office: $1.3 million (US rentals)

The Corsican Brothers is a 1941 American historical swashbuckler film directed by Gregory Ratoff and starring Douglas Fairbanks Jr. in a dual role as the titular conjoined twins who are separated at birth and raised in entirely different circumstances. Both thirst for revenge against the man who killed their parents (played by Akim Tamiroff), both fall in love with the same woman (portrayed by Ruth Warrick). The story is very loosely based on the 1844 novella Les frères Corses (in English: The Corsican Brothers) by French writer Alexandre Dumas, père.

Dimitri Tiomkin was nominated for an Academy Award for Best Original Score (Score of a Dramatic or Comedy Picture).

== Plot ==
In Corsica, the entire Franchi clan gather in anticipation of the birth of the child of Count and Countess Franchi (Henry Wilcoxon, Gloria Holden). Dr. Enrico Paoli (H. B. Warner) informs the count that his wife has given birth to Siamese twins. Count Franchi insists he try to separate them surgically, even after Paoli tells him that it would be a miracle if the babies survived. Before he can begin, however, the Franchis' bitter rivals the Colonnas launch a surprise attack, led by Baron Colonna (Akim Tamiroff). All of the Franchis are killed except the babies, who are carried to safety by Paoli and faithful family retainer Lorenzo (J. Carrol Naish).

Later, Paoli successfully separates the boys, but wonders if he has done the right thing. Since Colonna has found out that twins were born, Paoli agrees to let Count Franchi's good friends, Monsieur and Madame Dupre (Walter Kingsford, Nana Bryant), take Mario Franchi to Paris to raise as their own son, while Lorenzo hides in the hills with Lucien Franchi.

Twenty years pass. Lucien, now a bandit leader in Corsica, has a strange bond with his brother. More and more frequently, Lucien experiences what Mario does, though he has not been told about his twin. Lorenzo dismisses it as just dreams. At a Paris theatre, Mario saves Countess Isabelle Gravini (Ruth Warrick) from being annoyed by a marquis (Henry Brandon). When Mario is stabbed in the back by the marquis after a duel, Lucien also feels the pain.

Finally, when the twins are twenty-one years old, Paoli reunites them. They both swear to avenge their parents by killing Colonna, now the tyrannical ruler of Corsica. In addition, Lucien confirms that what he experienced actually occurred to Mario. They begin slaying Colonna's relatives, one by one, pretending to be the same person, leaving Colonna wondering how the bandit chief could be in two widely separated places in such a short time.

Meanwhile, Colonna decides to marry Isabelle. When her father (Pedro de Cordoba) refuses to consider the union, he is poisoned. Mario tells Isabelle of Colonna's intentions and hand in her father's death; she flees with Mario to the bandit camp. There they fall in love. A confused Lucien consults Dr. Paoli, unsure whether his own love for Isabelle is real or just a reflection of his brother's feelings. When Paoli is unable to answer, Lucien decides he must kill Mario in order to be truly free to live his own life. After Lucien confesses his love to Isabelle and embraces her against her will, Mario finds out and confronts him. Lucien tries to kill his hated brother; Lorenzo breaks up the knife fight. Unaware of this development, Isabelle decides to return to Paris to avoid creating a rift between the brothers. On the way, however, she is spotted and taken to Colonna.

Colonna's trusted adviser, Tomasso (John Emery), finally figures out that the Franchi twins are behind everything. They set a trap, using Isabelle as the bait. When Lucien refuses to risk his men, Mario pretends to be a French jeweler to try to rescue Isabelle. Maria (Veda Ann Borg), Colonna's mistress, helps him, but he is recognized and captured. He is whipped to try to extract Lucien's hiding place. Colonna forces Paoli to attend. When Mario faints, Paoli administers a drug that makes it appear as if Mario has died. Later, he manages to revive the young man.

Lucien, no longer sensing his bond to Mario, believes his brother is dead. He takes his band to deal with Colonna. He catches Colonna unarmed, but is fatally shot in the back by Tomasso. He manages to kill Tomasso before collapsing. Then Mario appears. In a sword fight, the last Franchi slays the last Colonna. Before Lucien dies, he reconciles with his brother.

== Cast ==
- Douglas Fairbanks Jr. as Mario and Lucien Franchi
- Ruth Warrick as Countess Isabelle Gravini
- Akim Tamiroff as Colonna
- J. Carrol Naish as Lorenzo
- H. B. Warner as Dr. Enrico Paoli
- John Emery as Tomasso
- Henry Wilcoxon as Count Victor Franchi
- Gloria Holden as Countess Franchi
- Walter Kingsford as Monsieur Dupre
- Nana Bryant as Madame Dupre
- Pedro de Cordoba as Gravini
- Veda Ann Borg as Maria
- William Farnum as Priest
- Sarah Padden as Nurse

== Production ==
Producer Edward Small had enjoyed success making films based on Dumas novels, such as The Count of Monte Cristo (1934) and The Man in the Iron Mask (1939). In November 1939 he announced he would film Dumas' Corsican Brothers. Louis Hayward, who had previously played a dual role for Small in Man in the Iron Mask (1939), was originally announced as star.

In May 1940 the film was officially put on United Artists' schedule for the following year. Production was delayed when Small had a falling out with United Artists over finances and did not make any films for them for six months. In March 1941 he announced Howard Eastbrook would write the script. Fritz Lang was rumoured to be hired as the film's director.

In April 1941 Douglas Fairbanks Jr signed to play the lead role. He later wrote in his memoirs that it had been over a year since he last made a movie "and I was much concerned that a great deal would be riding on this one I had very high hopes for the movie and was probably more sensitive to its shortcomings than I should have been."

Fairbanks said Small "though personally agreeable, had previously made inexpensive, inelegant films that fit his name a physique. He was not ready to risk an expensive, high quality film." Fairbanks said this led to the producer not paying for a high quality support cast. But he was attracted by the story and the fact "this was the first real swashbuckling hero part I ever played."

In June Gregory Ratoff signed to direct.

Ruth Warrick was borrowed from RKO to play the female lead.

Akim Tamrioff was the main villain; Fairbanks called him "an excellent Russian actor" who "was woefully miscast. He was physically short and too fat."

=== Shooting ===
Filming started in late July 1941. Filming was complete by September, after which Fairbanks went into the Navy.

The footage of twins was shot with a combination of double exposure, editing, doubles, and optical illusions.

Ratoff called it "a great picture... I made every second of it inside a studio."

Fairbanks Jr. says the film was his tribute to his father. He later said "the special effects could be better but our budget was limited... The final swordfight is the best thing about the picture."

Warwick says during filming she helped Fairbanks study the navy officer's manual. (Fairbanks was called up to the navy for active service during filming and this would be his last movie for a number of years.)

== Reception ==
=== Critical ===
Some reviews were excellent.

However, others were mixed. Theodore Strauss of The New York Times complained that "the script, like the sets, is rococo and heavily overstuffed, and so are the performances."

Variety was lukewarm: "Script ... is well set up to display the action qualities, but rather studious on the dialog and story motivation. Gregory Ratoff's direction is okay."

John Mosher of The New Yorker wrote: "All the activity on the screen does not necessarily imbue the audience with any too much excitement, for the picture runs a long, long time, and there are moments when vendetta squabbles pall a bit."

Reviewing the film in 2009, Dennis Schwartz of Ozus' World Movie Reviews gave it a B− and summed it up with the title of his review: "Good on the action part and bad on the dialogue part."

=== Box office ===
Fairbanks later said he "didn't think [the film] was going to be good. I thought we were cutting corners." But the film "was so successful that I could have bought out Bill Paley and CBS. So now it's one of my favourites." It was one of the most successful films Fairbanks made where he was the leading star.

Ruth Warrick later claimed the film "holds some sort of record for the number of times it has been shown on television."

== Sequel ==
In 1952, it was announced Louis Hayward would star in Return of the Corsican Brothers for director Ray Nazarro and United Artists. Hayward was replaced by Richard Greene and the film became titled The Bandits of Corsica.

== Notes ==
- Fairbanks, Douglas Jr (1993). A hell of a war. St. Martin's P.
