= Ken Mayer =

American actor

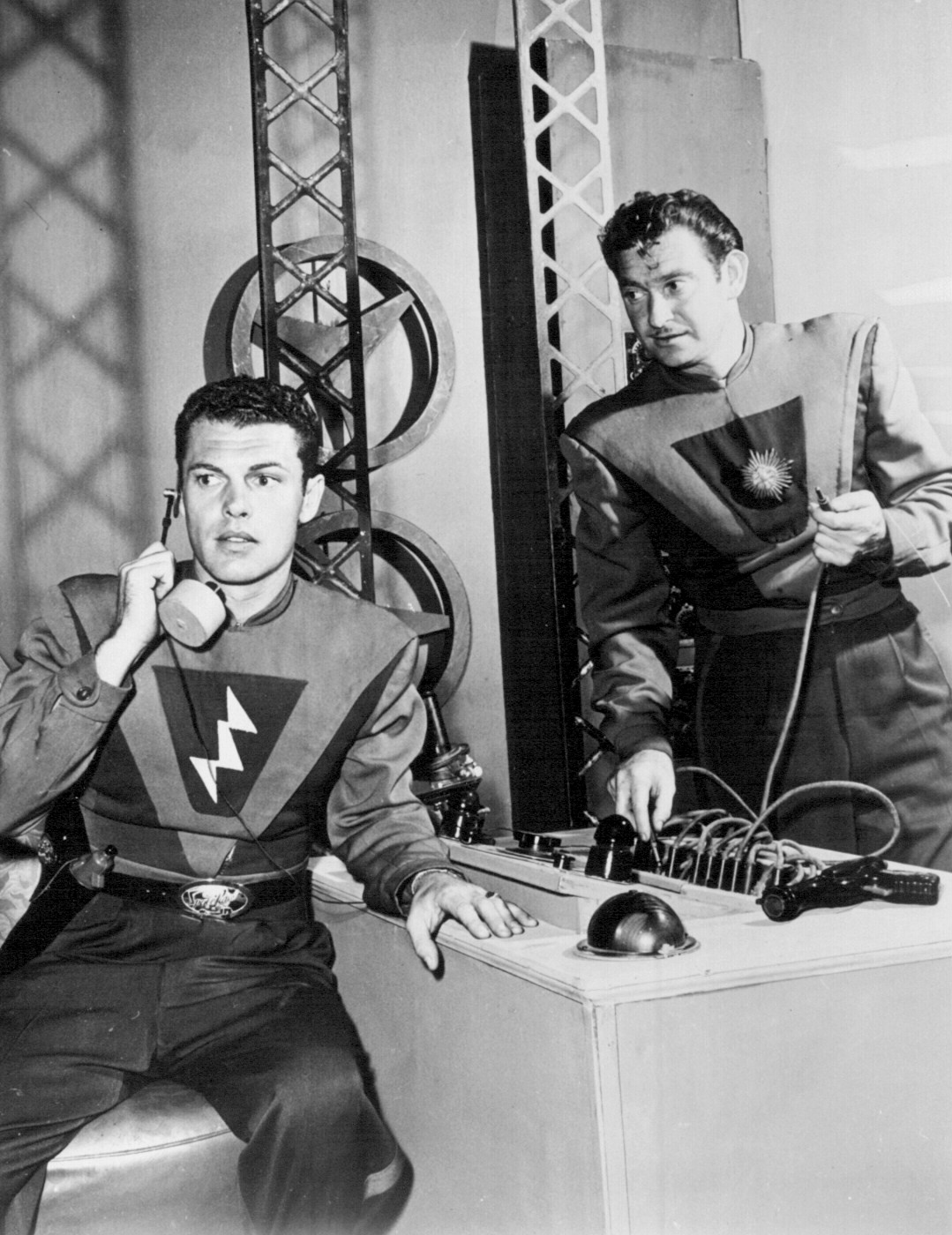
- Mayer (right) with Ed Kemmer in Space Patrol, 1954
- Born: June 25, 1918; San Francisco, California
- Died: January 30, 1985 (aged 66); North Hollywood, Los Angeles, California
- Occupation: Actor

Ken Mayer (June 25, 1918 – January 30, 1985) was an American actor best known for his portrayal of Major Robbie Robertson in the 1950s television series, Space Patrol.

== Career ==
Following service in the United States Army Air Corps' intelligence division, Mayer pursued acting at the Pasadena Community Playhouse, at which he garnered the "best-actor" award in 1948.

In addition to being the announcer on The Pinky Lee Show, Besides Space Patrol, Mayer appeared in the television series, Father Knows Best, Whirlybirds, Harbor Command, Casey Jones, Richard Diamond, Private Detective, Adventures of Superman, Jefferson Drum, Cimarron City, The Adventures of Rin Tin Tin, Rescue 8, Yancy Derringer, Gunsmoke (Episodes: "Sweet and Sour" in 1957, "Widow's Mite" in 1958, "The Cook" in 1960 & "Mistaken Identity" in 1967), Trackdown, The Alaskans, Black Saddle, Wanted Dead or Alive, Sugarfoot, Johnny Ringo, Overland Trail, Law of the Plainsman, The Texan, Peter Gunn, Two Faces West, Cheyenne, Maverick, The Life and Legend of Wyatt Earp, Bat Masterson, Rawhide, Wagon Train, My Favorite Martian, The Virginian, and Bonanza, among others. Mayer's work in TV commercials included those for Stroh's beer and Monroe shock absorbers.

Mayer was cast as Marshal Hobe Martin in the 1962 episode, "Girl with a Gun," on the syndicated anthology series, Death Valley Days, hosted by Stanley Andrews. That same year Mayer appeared as Deputy Clay Friendly on The Virginian in the episode titled "The Accomplice."

Mayer appeared in the films Ambush at Cimarron Pass, The Miracle of the Hills, Frontier Uprising, Gun Fight, You Have to Run Fast, The Clown and the Kid, Jack the Giant Killer, Black Gold, Spencer's Mountain, The New Interns, Bonnie and Clyde, The Last Challenge, and Little Big Man.

He died of a heart attack on January 30, 1985, in North Hollywood, Los Angeles, California at age 66.

== Filmography ==
Year	Title	Role	Notes
1955	Tight Spot	Policeman	Uncredited
1958	Ambush at Cimarron Pass	Cpl. Schwitzer	
1958	I Want to Live!	Drunk at Party	Uncredited
1959	Never Steal Anything Small	Angeletti	Uncredited
1959	The Miracle of the Hills	Milo Estes	
1959	The FBI Story	Casket Salesman	
1961	Frontier Uprising	Beaver McBride	
1961	Gun Fight	Joe Emery	
1961	You Have to Run Fast	Injun George	
1961	The Clown and the Kid	Trooper	
1962	Jack the Giant Killer	Boatswain	
1962	Black Gold	Felker	
1963	Spencer's Mountain	Mr. John	
1964	The New Interns	Detective Harper	
1965	One Way Wahine	Hugo Sokol	
1967	Bonnie and Clyde	Sheriff Smoot	Uncredited
1967	The Last Challenge	Tom Garrison	Uncredited
1970	Little Big Man	First Sergeant	

== Television ==
Year	Title	Role	Notes
1958	Gunsmoke	Zack Morton	S3:E35, "Widow's Mite"
1959	Wanted Dead or Alive	Charlie Trace	S2:E16, "Vanishing Act"
1960	Rawhide	Sam Burton	S2:E15, "Incident of the Devil and His Due"
1960	Gunsmoke	Jack Purdy	S6E14, "The Cook"
1960	Rawhide	Swanson	S3:E8, "Incident at Poco Tiempo"
1961	Rawhide	Thompson	S3:E23, "Incident of the Phantom Bugler"
1961	Rawhide	Joe Stapp	S3:E30, "Incident of the Wager on Payday"
