= Operation Bottleneck =

1961 film by Edward L. Cahn

- Original film poster
- Directed by: Edward L. Cahn
- Written by: Orville H. Hampton
- Produced by: Edward Small (executive); Robert E. Kent
- Starring: Ron Foster
- Production company: Zenith Pictures
- Distributed by: United Artists
- Release date: April 8, 1961
- Running time: 77 minutes
- Country: United States
- Language: English

Operation Bottleneck is a 1961 war film.

== Plot ==
During the Burma Campaign, a detachment of American paratroopers are aided by a group of local women in their mission against the Japanese.

Six paratroopers undertake an extremely dangerous mission against the Japanese. It will ultimately cost them their lives, except for one "lucky" survivor.

== Cast ==
- Ron Foster ... Lt. Rulan H. Voss
- Miiko Taka ... Ari
- Norman Alden ... Cpl. Lester 'Merc' Davenport
- John Clarke ... Sgt. Marty Regan
- Ben Wright ... Manders
- Dale Ishimoto ... Matsu
- Jane Chang ... Atsi
- Lemoi Chu ... LoLo
- Tiko Ling ... Tai
- Jin Jin Mai ... Sawbu
- June Kawai ... Danube
- George Yoshinaga ... Koju

== Reception ==
A review of the film in TV Guide described it as an "unexciting depiction of the attempts of a handful of WW II soldiers to rescue a buddy" with "not enough action to sustain its 76 minutes." A review of the film on the Nostalgia Central website described it as "naive and amateurish" and noted that "this may not be the worst war movie ever made, but it’s definitely up there, complete with bad acting, a ridiculous storyline, hokey jungle set, stock footage, and terrible production values."

== See also ==
- List of American films of 1961
