= International Lady =

1941 film by Tim Whelan

- Directed by: Tim Whelan
- Written by: Jack DeWitt; E. Lloyd Sheldon
- Screenplay by: Howard Estabrook
- Produced by: Edward Small
- Starring: George Brent; Ilona Massey; Basil Rathbone
- Cinematography: Hal Mohr
- Edited by: William F. Claxton; Grant Whytock
- Music by: Lucien Moraweck
- Production company: Edward Small Productions
- Distributed by: United Artists
- Release date: October 16, 1941
- Running time: 102 minutes
- Country: United States
- Language: English

International Lady is a 1941 American spy thriller film directed by Tim Whelan and starring George Brent, Ilona Massey, and Basil Rathbone. It was an independent production by Edward Small, released through United Artists. During the production stage, it was originally titled as G-Men versus Scotland Yard. It was released shortly before the entry of the United States into World War II.

== Plot ==
An American operative in Great Britain and his counterpart from Scotland Yard suspect the beautiful singer Carla Nillson of espionage. As they cleverly unravel her technique of singing in code over the radio, they track her from London to Lisbon to New York, where they succeed in tying her to a wealthy candy manufacturer, who is in reality the saboteur mastermind.

== Cast ==
- George Brent as Tim Hanley
- Ilona Massey as Carla Nillson
- Basil Rathbone as Reggie Oliver
- Gene Lockhart as Sidney Grenner
- George Zucco as Webster
- Francis Pierlot as Dr. Rowan
- Martin Kosleck as Bruner
- Charles D. Brown as Tetlow
- Marjorie Gateson as Bertha Grenner
- Leyland Hodgson as Sergeant Moulton
- Clayton Moore as Sewell
- Gordon De Main as Denby
- Frederick Worlock as Sir Henry
- Jack Mulhall as desk clerk
- Ralph Dunn as Don
- Lillian Yarbo as Prissy (uncredited)
