= Abroad with Two Yanks =

1944 film by Allan Dwan

- Original film poster
- Directed by: Allan Dwan; John E. Burch (assistant)
- Written by: Wilkie C Mahoney; Charles Rogers; Ted Sils adaptation Tedwell Chapman; Edward E. Seabrook
- Based on: story by Fred Guiol
- Produced by: Edward Small
- Starring: William Bendix; Dennis O'Keefe; Helen Walker
- Cinematography: Charles Lawton Jr.
- Edited by: Richard V. Heermance; Grant Whytock
- Production company: Edward Small Productions
- Distributed by: United Artists
- Release date: July 24, 1944
- Running time: 86 minutes (original); 80 minutes
- Country: United States
- Language: English

Abroad with Two Yanks is a 1944 American comedy film directed by Allan Dwan and starring Helen Walker, William Bendix and Dennis O'Keefe as the title characters. It was Bendix's third and final role in a film as a US Marine and the first of Dwan's three films about the United States Marine Corps.

== Plot ==
Arriving in Australia after the Battle of Guadalcanal, two American Marines compete with each other by stealing the other's Australian girlfriend. Their intense rivalry leads to their arrest and escape from confinement dressed as women.

== Cast ==
- William Bendix as Cpl. Biff Koraski
- Helen Walker as Joyce Stuart
- Dennis O'Keefe as Cpl. Jeff Reardon
- John Loder as Sgt. Cyril North
- George Cleveland as Roderick Stuart
- Janet Lambert as Alice
- James Flavin as Sgt. Wiggins
- Arthur Hunnicutt as Arkie

== Production ==
=== Hal Roach ===
The film was originally announced as one of Hal Roach's Streamliners titled Yanks Down Under starring William Bendix. Due to Hal Roach's contract for filming training films for the American Army, the film and Bendix's commitment to it was sold to producer Edward Small with Roach employee Fred Guiol to be credited as a producer. The film was the end of Roach's arrangement with United Artists.

=== Edward Small ===
In November 1943 the project was with Edward Small and was called Waltzing Matilda. William Bendix and Dennis O'Keefe were attached to star. The film was to be the second in a two-film contract between O'Keefe and Small, the first being Up in Mabel's Room.

According to United Artists' company records the film was called Yank Down Under and was made under a one-pucture deal with Bendix and "the company felt it would be a good low bracket picture with general audience appeal. It was the unanimous consensus of the stockholders that Mr. Smali's name should not appear on the picture, but that it should be presented by some corporation other than Mr. Small."

The title was eventually changed to Abroad with Two Yanks. Small later said he mainly bought the story because this title was so appealing.

In January 1944 Edward Small announced the film would be his next for United Artists. Lou Beslow and John Twist were writing the script and Lew Seiler was borrowed from 20th Century Fox to direct. However, by February Allan Dwan, who had just made Up in Mabel's Room for Small, had been signed to direct

Anna Lee was meant to play the female lead. She accepted the part while in Las Vegas for her divorce proceedings. However, on returning to Hollywood she decided that the part was not suitable for her and pulled out of the film. She was replaced by Helen Walker, who was borrowed from Paramount.

Filming started March 1944. Dwan said "That was a lot of fun - Bendix and O’Keefe dressed up like girls. We used a theatre in Hollywood for some of the interiors, right next to the Brown Derby. Now, it was such a hell of a job putting on that make-up and harnessing on those clothes, that they kept them on when we all went out to lunch."

Hedy Lamarr took a photo with Bendix and O'Keefe around the making of the film which Small subsequently issued. Lamarr then sued Small for damages.

Dwan said "Small had writers sitting with him while I was shooting. And around two or three in the afternoon he’d send down the pages that were supposed to have been shot that morning, but I’d already shot what I wanted to shoot and we’d just file the script away. So I was always off-the-cuff and he was about a day behind me with the script all the way through." The director enjoyed working with Small though calling him "a pro. A great showman and not an interfering guy. He knows his way."

== Reception ==
Reviews were strong. The New York Times said the film was done in "the right spirit".

=== Proposed sequel ===
Edward Small wanted to star O'Keefe and Bendix in a series of films and in August announced a sequel Two Yanks in Paris. Charles Rogers and Wilkie Mahoney worked on a story. However no film resulted.

== Radio adaptation ==
The Screen Guild Theater" broadcast a 30-minute radio adaptation of the movie on April 9, 1945, with William Bendix and Dennis O'Keefe reprising their film roles with Marjorie Reynolds in Helen Walker's role.

== See also ==
- List of American films of 1944

== Notes ==
- Bogdanovich, Peter (1971). Allan Dwan; the last pioneer. p. 166.
