= John Clarke (actor) =

American actor (1931–2019)

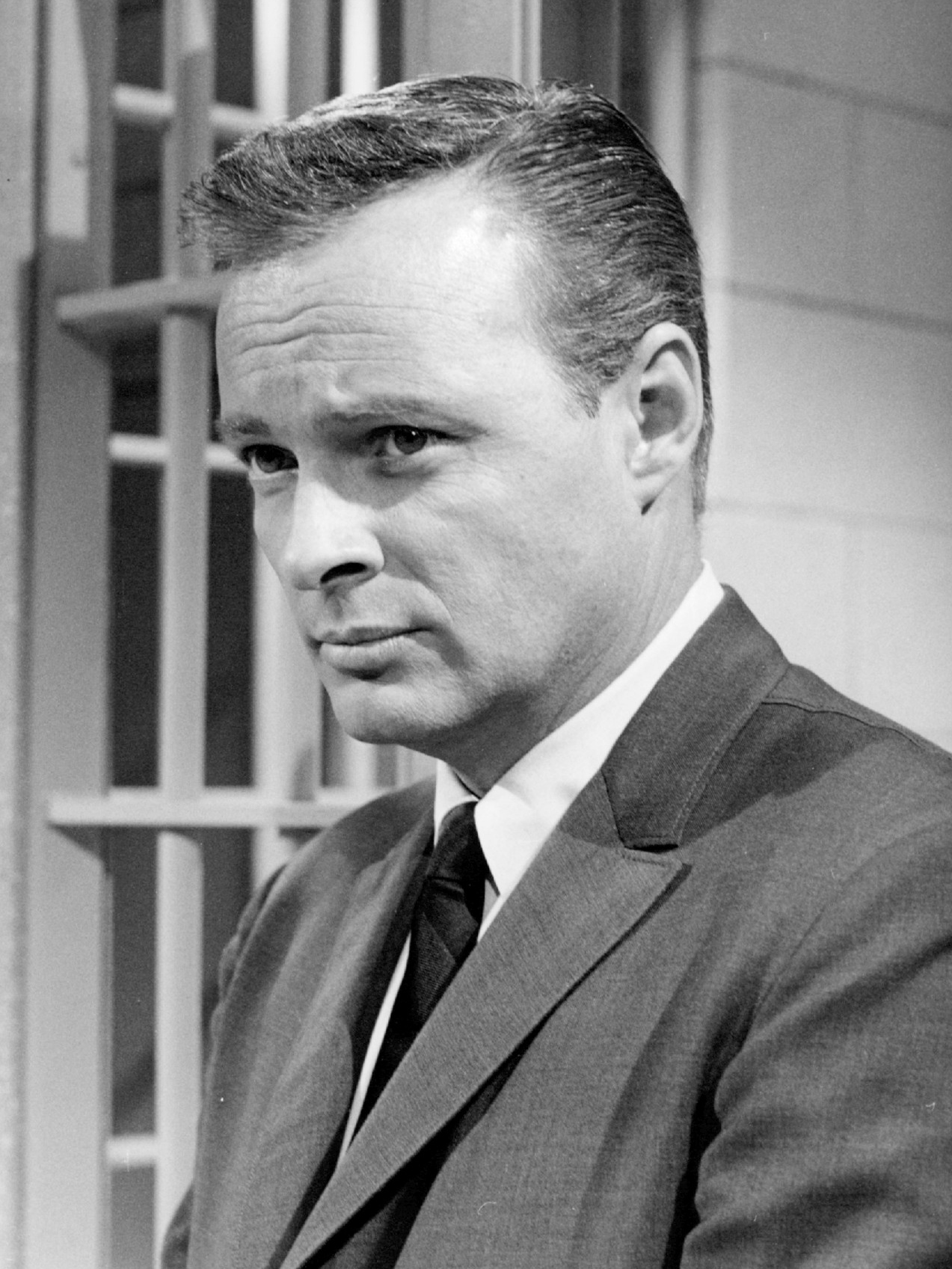
- Clarke as Mickey Horton in Days of Our Lives, 1967
- Born: April 14, 1931; South Bend, Indiana, U.S.
- Died: October 16, 2019 (aged 88); Laguna Beach, California, U.S.
- Occupation: Actor
- Years active: 1959–2004
- Known for: Days of Our Lives as Mickey Horton
- Children: Melinda Clarke

John Clarke (April 14, 1931 – October 16, 2019) was an American television actor. Clarke is recognized for originating and portraying Mickey Horton on the NBC soap opera Days of Our Lives for 39 years, beginning with the debut of the program in 1965, until his retirement in 2004.

In 1959, Clarke acted with Ida Lupino in an episode of CBS's The Twilight Zone titled The Sixteen-Millimeter Shrine. In the 1961-1962 television season, he was cast in 27 episodes as Patrolman Joe Huddleston in Leslie Nielsen's ABC crime drama series, The New Breed.

His daughter is actress Melinda Clarke, who started out on Days of our Lives and later played Julie Cooper on the television series, The O.C.

Clarke died on October 16, 2019, from complications of pneumonia at the age of 88.

== Awards ==
He was nominated for the 1979 Daytime Emmy Award for Outstanding Actor in a Daytime Drama Series for Days of Our Lives. In 2005 he was awarded the Daytime Emmys Lifetime Achievement Award

== Selected filmography ==
=== Film ===
- Operation Bottleneck (1961) - Sgt. Marty Regan
- You Have to Run Fast (1961) - Chuck
- Gun Street (1961) - Deputy Sheriff Sam Freed
- Judgment at Nuremberg (1961) - Prison Guard (uncredited)
- It's a Mad, Mad, Mad, Mad World (1963) - Helicopter Pilot (uncredited)
- The Thin Red Line (1964) - (uncredited)
- Finger on the Trigger (1965) - Numitah
- The Satan Bug (1965) - Lt. Raskin
- Critics and Other Freaks (1997) - Curmundgeon

=== Television ===
- Gunsmoke (1959, 1962 & 1963) - Tom Rutger, Mackie & Young Man
- Destination Space (1959, TV Movie) - Space Ship Crew
- The Twilight Zone (1959, 1 episode) - Young Jerry Hearndan
- Hawaiian Eye (1960, 1 episode) - Jablonsky
- The New Breed (1961–1962, 27 episodes) - Officer Joe Huddleston
- Petticoat Junction (1963, 1 episode, Cave Woman) - Brooks T Webster
- Death Valley Days (1960–1968, 7 episodes) - Reverend Peter Green / Fred Gilmer / Maurice Dory / Bill Crawford / Virgil Earp / Harlow / Mark Kellogg / Will Skidmore
- Days of Our Lives (1965–2004) - Mickey Horton (final appearance)
