= Gun Street =

1961 film by Edward L. Cahn

- Theatrical release poster
- Directed by: Edward L. Cahn
- Written by: Sam Freedle (as Sam C. Freedle)
- Produced by: Robert E. Kent
- Starring: James Brown; Jean Willes; John Clarke
- Cinematography: Gilbert Warrenton
- Edited by: Kenneth G. Crane (as Kenneth Crane)
- Music by: Richard LaSalle (as Richard La Salle)
- Production company: Zenith Pictures
- Distributed by: United Artists
- Release dates: November 5, 1961 (United States); November 22, 1961 (Los Angeles)
- Running time: 68 minutes
- Country: United States
- Language: English

Gun Street is a 1961 American Western film directed by Edward L. Cahn and starring James Brown, Jean Willes and John Clarke.

== Plot ==
Gary Wells (Warren Kemmerling), a violent criminal sentenced to the death penalty, escapes from prison and vows revenge against those he blames for his capture. Local sheriff Chuck Morton (James Brown) is tasked with warning Wells' likely victims. At the top of Morton's list are Wells' ex-wife, Janice (Peggy Stewart); her new husband, Dr. Dean Knudtson (John Pickard); and Jeff Baxley (Herb Armstrong), whose testimony in court helped convict Wells.

== Cast ==
- James Brown as Sheriff Chuck Morton
- Jean Willes as Joan Brady
- John Clarke as Deputy Sheriff Sam Freed
- John Pickard as Dr. Knudson
- Med Flory as Willie Driscoll
- Peggy Stewart as Mrs. Knudson
- Sandra Stone as Pat Wells
- Warren J. Kemmerling as Gary Wells (as Warren Kemmerling)
- Nesdon Booth as Mayor Phillips
- Herb Armstrong as Jeff Baxley
- Renny McEvoy as Operator

== See also ==
- List of American films of 1961
