= King of the Turf =

1939 film by Alfred E. Green

- Directed by: Alfred E. Green
- Written by: George Bruce
- Produced by: Edward Small
- Starring: Adolphe Menjou; Dolores Costello
- Production company: Edward Small Productions
- Distributed by: United Artists
- Release date: February 17, 1939 (United States)
- Running time: 88 minutes
- Country: United States
- Language: English

King of the Turf is a 1939 American drama film starring Adolphe Menjou.

== Plot ==
Jim Mason was once a distinguished figure in the sport of horse racing, but his reputation was ruined by a crooked race that caused the death of a horse and a jockey. He becomes an alcoholic and a drifter, forgotten by all.

On a freight train, hopping a free ride, Mason runs into a young runaway boy called Goldie, who has experience as a stable boy. As they become friends, Goldie helps him to give up drinking. They attend a horse auction where, due to a technicality, they are able to buy a horse for just two dollars.

Goldie rides the horse successfully in races, with Mason training him. But when the boy's mother, Eve Barnes, turns up looking for him, Mason realizes to his astonishment that Eve is his ex-wife, making Goldie his own son.

At her behest, Mason spares him from a risky future in horse racing by pretending to revert to his previous corrupt and drunken ways. Goldie refuses, however, to deliberately lose the big race as the crooked gamblers demand.

== Cast ==
- Adolphe Menjou as Mason
- Roger Daniel as Goldie
- Dolores Costello as Eve
- William Demarest as Arnold

== See also ==
- List of films about horse racing
