= Two Faces West =

- Starring: Charles Bateman; Francis DeSales; Joyce Meadows; Paul Comi; June Blair; Paul Barselou; Paul Pepper; Don Spruance; Robert Anderson; Richard Reeves
- Music by: Joseph Weiss
- Country of origin: United States
- No. of episodes: 39

Production
- Producers: Donald Gold; Jonas Seinfeld
- Production company: Screen Gems

Original release
- Release: October 1960 – July 1961

Two Faces West is an American syndicated Western television series set in the Wild West running from October 1960 to July 1961 for a total of 39 half-hour episodes (one per week on a continuous run). It was produced by Donald Gold and Jonas Seinfeld with Matthew Rapf as the on-set producer for Screen Gems. Music was by Joseph Weiss. Despite being syndicated to 150 broadcast stations the show is somewhat forgotten, never having been repeated, and never released on DVD.

== Synopsis ==
The overall premise was that two identical male twins, the January brothers, were in different roles in the same locale: one a doctor and one a U.S. Marshal - one killing, one curing. Between the two they bring civility to a pioneer town in the mid west. Ben is clad in black like an archetypal badman. Typical plots involved them being mistaken for one another or deliberately swapping. Both men were in love with Julie Greer, owner of the town's hotel.

The title is a play on the wording of the 1940 John Wayne film Three Faces West.

The stories are set in the town of Gunnison, Colorado in the 1860s. The series was the first to use split-screen on a perpetual basis in order to get the brothers to talk face to face. In less technical shots, where one brother had his back to the camera, these were shot with stand-in Paul Pepper (who also appeared in his own right as Billy).

Curiously the appearance of Deforest Kelley and Leonard Nimoy predated their casting together in Star Trek by five years.

== Cast ==
- Charles Bateman as both Dr. Rick January and Marshal Ben January
- Francis De Sales as Sheriff Maddox
- Joyce Meadows as Stacy
- Paul Comi as Deputy Johnny Evans
- June Blair as Julie Greer, owner of the hotel
- Paul Barselou as Amos
- Paul Pepper as Billy (and rear shots of the January brothers)
- Don Spruance as J. C. Wilkes
- Robert Anderson as Amos
- Richard Reeves as Charlie Steams

== Guest stars ==
- DeForest Kelley as Vern Cleary
- Leonard Nimoy
- Gregg Palmer
- L. Q. Jones
- Rex Holman
- Victor French
- Robert Burton
- Willard Sage as the Governor
- Chris Alcaide as Corey Willis
- Kay E. Kuter as Sheb
- Dabbs Greer as Willie Medford
- Paul Birch as Josh Wilkes
- Julian Burton as Zack
- Howard Caine as Jethro
- Ron Hagerthy as Lucas Garrett
- Denver Pyle as Sam
- Robert Stevenson as Fincher
- Robert Brubaker as Cartwright
- Walter Burke as Prof Gluyas Hatwell
- Don C. Harvey as Smith
- Marianna Hill as the gypsy
- David Manley as Piper
- John Marley as Josiah Brady
- Jay Strong as Jolie Wilkes
- Garry Walberg as Connelly
- Donnelly Rhodes as Starbook
- Baynes Barron as Reynolds
- Jeanne Bates as Elie Bishop
- Lou Krugman as Dave Brandon
- Robert Myers as Morgan
- Grace Raynor as Linda
- Dick Rich as Sheriff Russ Kane
- Thayer Roberts as Leopold
- Jody Warner as Ellen
- Guy De Vestel as Frenchy
- Maggie McCarter as Emma
- Val Benedict as Delalane
- Joan Grenville as Della Lyle
- Michael Levin as Mario
- Barry McGuire as Al
- Arvid Nelson as Oliver
- Stuart Randall as Evans
- Hal Smith as Charlie Todd
- Johnny Walsh as Lee
- Glenn Stensel as Pete
- Pamela Duncan as Liza
- Stuart Nisbet as the bartender
- Ralph Reed as Teddy
- Marya Stevens as Sally
- Tex Terry as stagecoach driver
- Robert B. Williams as Will Turner
- Thom Carney as Baker
- Henry Gillen as Will
- Raymond Guth as Paul Bishop
- Dwight Marfield as Ed
- Michael Sargent as johnson
- Martin Smith as a thug
- John Cason as Wilkes' man
- Thano Rama as Porro
- Roy Jenson as Wilkes' man
- Kenneth Becker as Fred
- Henry Beckman as Duvall
- Kathie Browne as Laurie Parker
- James T. Callahan as Cleve
- Dyan Cannon as a lady in town
- Walter Coy as Cauter
- Warren J. Kemmerling as George
- Charles Maxwell as Frank Turner
- Ken Mayer as Earl
- John Milford as Will
- Robert Patten as Jim Evans
- John Pickard as Laird Willoughby
- Michael Stefani as Tom
- Barbara Stuart as Millie Adams
- Hal Torey as Finch
- Robert Beecher as Judas Tripe
- Dehl Berti
- George Brenlin
- Roxane Brooks
- Lew Brown as Bray
- William Bryant as Corey
- William Challee as Caleb
- John Cliff
- Dennis Cross
- Jody Fair as Sarah
- James Garde as Augie
- Kelton Garwood as Ridge
- Pamela Grey as Mary
- James Griffith as Les Hardy
- Ron Hayes as Toley
- Darlene Hendricks as Sarah
- Lisabeth Hush as Florie
- Chubby Johnson as Riley
- Bernard Kates as Chet
- Walter Kray as Cole Burnet
- Jon Lormer
- Ric Marlow
- Jack Mather as Caldwell
- John McLiam
- Don Megowan
- George Mitchell as Dan Borden
- Laurie Mitchell as Myrna
- James Noah as Joel
- Ryan O'Neal
- Gregg Palmer as Cowlin
- Mike Ragan as Charlie Baker
- Gilman Rankin as Ned
- Chris Robinson as Gordie
- Joseph Ruskin as Coley
- Jackie Russell as Karen
- Johnny Seven as Gino Carew
- Richard Shannon as Buchanan
- Justin Smith as Varney
- Ron Soble as Collins
- Irene Tedrow as Lilly
- Joe Turkel as Turner
- Warren Vanders as Tom Borden
- Wally West as a townsman (uncredited)
- Herman Hack as a townsman (uncredited)
