= Boy Who Caught a Crook =

1961 film

The Boy Who Caught a Crook
- Directed by: Edward L. Cahn
- Written by: Nathan Juran
- Produced by: Edward Small (executive); Robert E. Kent
- Starring: Wanda Hendrix; Don Beddoe; Roger Mobley
- Cinematography: Gilbert Warrenton
- Edited by: Robert Carlisle
- Music by: Richard LaSalle
- Production company: Harvard Film Corporation
- Distributed by: United Artists
- Release date: October 25, 1961
- Running time: 72 minutes
- Country: United States
- Language: English

The Boy Who Caught a Crook is a 1961 children's film about a young boy who tracks down a gangster.

== Cast ==
- Wanda Hendrix as Laura
- Don Beddoe as Colonel
- Roger Mobley as Kid
- Richard Crane as Connors
- Johnny Seven as Rocky Kent
- Robert J. Stevenson as Sergeant
- Bill Walker as Keeper
- Henry Hunter as Flannigan
