= Inside the Mafia =

1959 film by Edward L. Cahn

- Theatrical release poster
- Directed by: Edward L. Cahn
- Written by: Orville H. Hampton
- Produced by: Robert E. Kent
- Starring: Cameron Mitchell; Robert Strauss
- Edited by: Grant Whytock
- Music by: Albert Glasser
- Production company: Premium Pictures
- Distributed by: United Artists
- Release date: September 1959 (United States)
- Running time: 72 minutes
- Country: United States
- Language: English

Inside the Mafia is a 1959 film noir crime film based on a true incident. It was based on the Albert Anastasia murder and subsequent Apalachin Meeting.

== Plot ==
The gangster Augie Martello is riddled with bullets in an assassination attempt organized by Tony Ledo, a mob lieutenant. Mafia boss Johnny Lucero is returning after 10 years out of the country. Ledo intends to kill Lucero and take over.

The family of airstrip traffic controller Rod Balcom, including his daughters, is taken hostage as the gang members await Lucero's plane, with gunman Sam Galey assigned to stand guard over them. Ledo intends to have the entire family killed after Martello's death and his planned takeover, but Lucero gets the drop on him and shoots Ledo to death. Lucero is then captured by the police.

== Cast ==
- Cameron Mitchell as Tony Ledo
- Robert Strauss as Sam Galey
- Grant Richards as Johnny Lucero
- Ted de Corsia as Augie Martello
- Carol Nugent as Sandy Balcom
- Elaine Edwards as Anne Balcom
- Edward Platt as Dan Regent
- James Brown as Capt. Blair
- Louis Jean Heydt as Rod Balcom

== See also ==
- Three Came to Kill (1960) – A similar film by Edward L. Cahn with Cameron Mitchell
- List of American films of 1959
