= Igloo (1932 film) =

1932 film

- Directed by: Ewing Scott
- Produced by: Edward Small
- Starring: Gayne Whitman (narrator)
- Cinematography: Roy Klaffki
- Edited by: Richard Cahoon
- Music by: J. S. Zamecnik
- Production company: Edward Small Productions
- Distributed by: Universal Studios
- Release date: July 1, 1932
- Running time: 70 minutes
- Country: United States
- Language: English

Igloo is a 1932 American pre-Code documentary film released by Universal Studios.

== Production ==
In February 1931, Edward Small sent an expedition to the Arctic headed by Ewing Scott with Roy Klaffki as a cameraman to make a film. They were accompanied by Ray Wise, a half Eskimo, half Russian and shot for six months. They went missing for 32 days off Icy Cape, Alaska and were rescued by some whalers. They returned with 100,000 feet of film.
