= Roger Mobley =

American actor

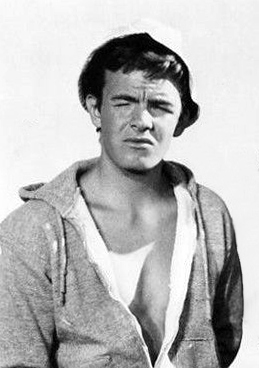
- Mobley in The Wonderful World of Disney, circa 1968
- Born: January 16, 1949 (age 77); Evansville, Indiana, U.S.
- Occupations: Child actor (1958—1967); Green Beret (1968—1970); Police officer
- Spouse: Sharie Barclay Mobley (m. 1968)
- Children: 3

Roger Lance Mobley (born January 16, 1949) is a former child actor in the 1950s and 1960s who made more than 118 television appearances and co-starred in nine feature films in a nine-year career. He served in the Green Berets (46th Special Forces Company) during the Vietnam War, and was subsequently a police officer in Beaumont, Texas.

== Background ==
Mobley is one of eight children of Arthur Lance Mobley (1922–2002) and Charlene V. Mobley (1924–2012). Lance Mobley, as the father was known, was born in Centralia in southern Illinois, and a retired pipefitter at the time of his death in a hospital in Beaumont, Texas. Charlene and he married in 1939, when he was 17, and she was 15. The couple moved from Indiana in the early 1950s to Pecos in Reeves County in West Texas before they headed in 1957 to Whittier, near Los Angeles.

== Acting ==
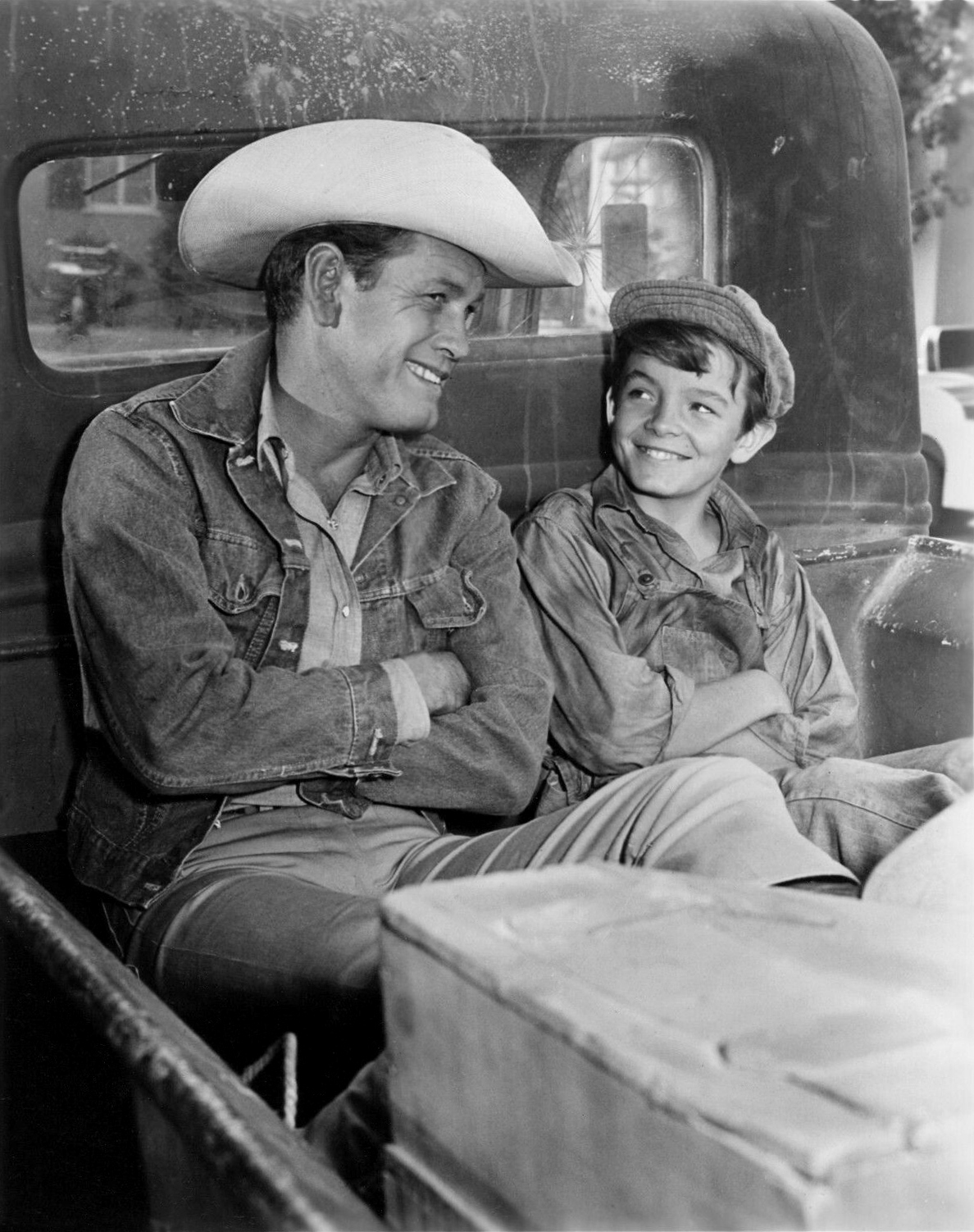
Mobley with Earl Holliman in The Wide Country (1962)

Mobley (pronounced "Mawbley") sang with his older brother and sister in The Little Mobley Trio in Texas where the family then lived. After moving to California when Mobley was six or seven, the trio appeared on the Ted Mack's Original Amateur Hour with disappointing results.

They were spotted, though, by Lola Moore, then the pre-eminent agent for child actors, who expressed an interest in Roger and arranged his audition for the part of eight-year-old Homer "Packy" Lambert in the NBC Saturday-morning Western television series, Fury, starring Peter Graves, Bobby Diamond, and William Fawcett. He appeared in 38 episodes of the series. In 1959 he appeared on Wagon Train S2 E36 "The Rodney Lawrence Story" in which he portrayed the title character as a young boy. The adult Rodney was played by Dean Stockwell.

In 1964, after having been impressed with Mobley's performance as Gustav in Emil and the Detectives, Walt Disney signed him to the title role in the highly acclaimed and Emmy-nominated "Adventures of Gallegher" serials for the Wonderful World of Color. Gallegher is an amateur sleuth newspaper reporter, a character created by author Richard Harding Davis.

== Military ==
After 9 years and appearances in 118 television programs or feature films, Mobley's career was interrupted at the age of 18 by military service when he was drafted into the Vietnam War. Mobley eventually graduated Parachute Jump School (Fort Benning, Georgia) and JFK Special Warfare School (Fort Bragg, North Carolina) and was assigned to the 6th Special Group (Fort Bragg) and the 46th Special Special Forces Co., 1st Special Forces (1969–1970), for sixteen months before being honorably discharged in 1970.

== Personal life ==
Upon his return home to Whittier from the military, Mobley found that only $6,000 earnings from his extensive film work as a child had been saved for him. His new bride and he moved to Texas, where he landed a position on the Beaumont, Texas Police Dept. He later went on to become a pastor.

He has been married to his wife Shari since 1968, and they have three children, 12 grandchildren, and one great-grandchild. Mobley and his wife are members of the Lutheran Church Missouri Synod.

== Filmography ==
=== Film ===
Year	Title	Role	Notes
1959	A Dog's Best Friend	Pip Wheeler	Film (with Bill Williams and Marcia Henderson)
1961	The Runaway	Felipe Roberto	Film
1961	The Silent Call	Guy Brancato	Film (with Gail Russell and David McLean)
1961	Boy Who Caught a Crook	Kid	Children's film
1961	The Comancheros	Bub Schofield	Film (uncredited)
1962	Jack the Giant Killer	Peter	Adventure film
1963	Inside Danny Baker	Danny Baker	Television film
	Dime with a Halo	Jose	Film
1964	Emil and the Detectives	Gustav	Film
1979	The Apple Dumpling Gang Rides Again	Sentry	Film
1980	The Kids Who Knew Too Much	Police sergeant	Television film
2018	The Spark	Paul	Television film

=== Television ===
Year	Title	Role	Notes
1958	The Mickey Mouse Club	Himself	Episode: "Talent Roundup Day - The Mobley Trio"
1958–1960	Fury	Homer "Packy" Lambert	38 episodes
1959	Buckskin	Noah Wesley	Episode: "Mr. Rush's Secretary" (with Jane Darwell)
1959	Bachelor Father	Little Leaguer	Episode: "Bentley Goes to Washington" (with Whit Bissell, Sue Ane Langdon, and Flip Mark)
1959—1963	Wagon Train	Multiple roles	Eight episodes
1960	Hawaiian Eye	Stevie Hughes	Episode: "With This Ring" (with Paul Richards and Ruta Lee)
1960—1961	The Detectives	Boy and Paul	Two episodes: "A Barrel Full of Monkeys" and "Shuttle"
1961	Dick Powell's Zane Grey Theatre	Little Martin	Episode: "The Scar" (with Lew Ayres, Mort Mills, Patricia Barry, and Alan Hale, Jr.)
1961	The Donna Reed Show	Tony Martin, Jr.	Episode: "Tony Martin Visits" (with Tony Martin)
1961	Outlaws	Davey Morgan	Episode: "Blind Spot" (with Gary Merrill)
1961	National Velvet	Bradley Walton, III	Episode: "The Riding Mistress" (with Richard Deacon and Beverly Lunsford)
1961	The Loretta Young Show	Henry Sands, Jr.	Episode: "Not in Our Stars" (with Loretta Young and H. M. Wynant)
1961	Gunsmoke	Thad Ferrin	Episode: "Miss Kitty" (with Frank Sutton, Harold J. Stone, and Dabbs Greer)
1961	Cain's Hundred	Cort Cortner	Episode: "The Fixer"
1961—1962	87th Precinct	Danny and Lane Conners, respectively	Episodes: "Lady Killer" and "A Bullet for Katie"
1961 and 1963	Death Valley Days	Little Matt Denby and Matt, respectively	Episodes: "The Madstone" (with Myron Healey) and "Deadly Decision" (with James Caan)
1961 and 1965	Dr. Kildare	Jamie Carroll and Alan Burnside, respectively	Episodes: "Hit and Run" and "The Time Buyers"
1962	Straightaway	Dale	Episode: "A Moment in the Sun" (with Robert Blake)
1962	The Tall Man	David Harper	Episode: "St. Louis Woman" (with Jan Clayton and Russ Conway)
1962	Alcoa Premiere	Lonnie Dunlap	"Second Chance" (with Earl Holliman, Andrew Prine, Cliff Robertson, Jacqueline Scott, Roy Barcroft, and Don "Red" Barry)
1962	Frontier Circus	Andy Jukes	Episode: "Mighty Like Rogue" (with J. Pat O'Malley, Jena Engstrom, and Joby Baker)
1962	The Law and Mr. Jones	Tommy Pierce	Episode: "The Boy Who Said 'No'" (with Russell Johnson and Eve McVeagh)
1962	The Virginian	Homer Tatum	Episode: "Throw a Long Rope" (with fellow guest stars John Anderson, Ted Knight, and Jacqueline Scott)
1962	The Wide Country (series spun off from Alcoa Premiere episode above)	Billy-Joe Perry	Episode: "Journey Down a Dusty Road" (with Wallace Ford)
1962	Cheyenne	Gabe Morse and Billy Zachary	Episodes "The Idol" and "Sweet Sam"
1962	Going My Way	Mike Corbin	Episode: "Ask Me No Questions" (with Kevin McCarthy and Joanne Linville)
1962	Empire	Kieran Haskell	Episode: "When the Gods Laugh" (with James Gregory)
1962—1963	Our Man Higgins	Jamie and Jamie MacDermott, respectively	Two episodes: "Golf Partner" and "The Royal and Ancient Game" (both with Roy Roberts)
1963	Route 66	Joby Paxton	Episode: "Somehow It Gets to Be Tomorrow" (with Martin Balsam)
1963	I'm Dickens, He's Fenster	Ralph	Episode: "Number One Son"
1963	The Dakotas	Christopher Deus	Episode: "Feud at Snake River"
1964	Insight	The Urchin	Episode: "The Urchin"
1964	Ben Casey	Paul Hamilton, Jr.	Episode: "Keep Out of Reach of Adults" (with Richard Kiley and Geraldine Brooks)
1964	Destry	Toby Brady	Episode: "Red Brady's Kid"
1964—1980	Walt Disney's Wonderful World of Color	Multiple roles	17 episodes
1965	The Farmer's Daughter	Alan Page	Episode: "Follow the Leader"
1967—1968	Dragnet	Audie Fulton and Charles L. Vail, respectively	Episodes: "The Big Kids" and "The Big Departure"
