= The Bandits of Corsica =

1953 film by Ray Nazarro

- Directed by: Ray Nazarro
- Written by: Frank Burt; Richard Schayer
- Produced by: Edward Small
- Starring: Richard Greene; Paula Raymond; Raymond Burr
- Cinematography: George E. Diskant
- Edited by: Grant Whytock
- Music by: Irving Gertz
- Production company: Global Productions
- Distributed by: United Artists
- Release date: February 27, 1953
- Running time: 81 minutes
- Country: United States
- Language: English

The Bandits of Corsica, alternative title The Return of the Corsican Brothers, is a 1953 American adventure film directed by Ray Nazarro and starring Richard Greene, Paula Raymond and Raymond Burr. It is loosely based on the 1844 novella by Alexandre Dumas, père: The Corsican Brothers.

== Plot ==
In the eighteenth century, twin brothers overthrow a sadistic aristocrat.

== Cast ==
- Richard Greene as Mario/Carlos
- Paula Raymond as Christina
- Raymond Burr as Jonatto
- Dona Drake as Zelda
- Raymond Greenleaf as Paoli
- Lee Van Cleef as Nerva
- Frank Puglia as Riggio
- Nestor Paiva as Lorenzo
- Peter Mamakos as Diegas
- Paul Cavanagh as Dianza
- Peter Brocco as Angelo
- George J. Lewis as Arturo
- Clayton Moore as Ricardo
- Virginia Brissac as Maria
- Francis McDonald as Grisha
- Michael Ansara as Blacksmith
- William Forrest as Marquis
- John Pickard as Coachman

== Production ==
Filming started September 1952.
