= You Have to Run Fast =

1961 film by Edward L. Cahn

- Directed by: Edward L. Cahn
- Written by: Orville H. Hampton
- Produced by: Edward Small (uncredited); Robert E. Kent
- Starring: Craig Hill; Elaine Edwards; Grant Richards
- Cinematography: Gilbert Warrenton
- Edited by: Robert Carlisle
- Music by: Richard La Salle
- Production company: Harvard Film
- Distributed by: United Artists
- Release date: July 1961
- Running time: 73 minutes
- Country: United States
- Language: English

You Have to Run Fast is a 1961 American crime film directed by Edward L. Cahn and starring Craig Hill, Elaine Edwards, and Grant Richards.

== Plot ==
After trying to save a mortally wounded detective's life, Dr. Condon flees for his own life because of gangster Jim Craven's intention to eliminate him, an eyewitness to the crime. Condon moves to another town and changes his name. He finds lodging in the remote home of the wheelchair-using Colonel Maitland and daughter Laurie.

Craven comes to town, is recognized by a deputy and shoots him. Condon must reveal his true identity as a doctor to operate on the law officer. He is at Craven's mercy, but Colonel Maitland's deadeye aim with a rifle saves his life.

== Cast ==
- Craig Hill as Dr. Condon / Frank Harlow
- Elaine Edwards as Laurie
- Grant Richards as Big Jim Craven
- Willis Bouchey as Col. Maitland
- Claudia Barrett as Fran
