= James Brown (actor) =

American film and television actor (1920–1992)

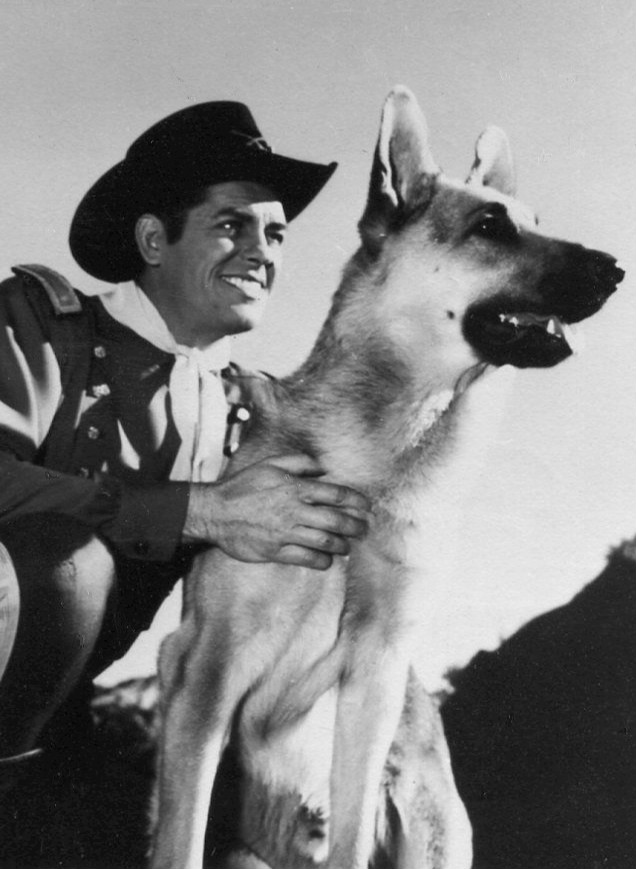
- Brown (left) with Rin Tin Tin in The Adventures of Rin Tin Tin, 1955
- Born: James Edward Brown; March 22, 1920; Desdemona, Texas, U.S.
- Died: April 11, 1992 (aged 72); Woodland Hills, California, U.S.
- Education: Baylor University
- Occupations: Film and television actor
- Years active: 1941–1992
- Spouse: Betty Brown
- Children: 2

James Edward Brown (March 22, 1920 – April 11, 1992) was an American film and television actor. He was best known for playing Lt. Ripley Masters in the American western television series The Adventures of Rin Tin Tin.

== Early life and education ==
Brown was born in Desdemona, Texas. He attended Baylor University, representing the university in tennis. He began his acting career in 1941 with an uncredited role as a medic in the film Ride, Kelly, Ride. His first credited role was in the 1942 film The Forest Rangers.

Later in his career, Brown appeared in films including The Good Fellows, Objective, Burma!, Gun Street, The Big Fix, When the Clock Strikes, Air Force, Irma la Douce, The Fabulous Texan, Young and Willing, The Gallant Legion, The Younger Brothers, Corvette K-225, Sands of Iwo Jima, Yes Sir, That's My Baby, Our Hearts Were Young Gay (and its sequel Our Hearts Were Growing Up), Chain Lightning, Missing Women, Inside the Mafia, The Groom Wore Spurs, Space Probe Taurus, and Going My Way.

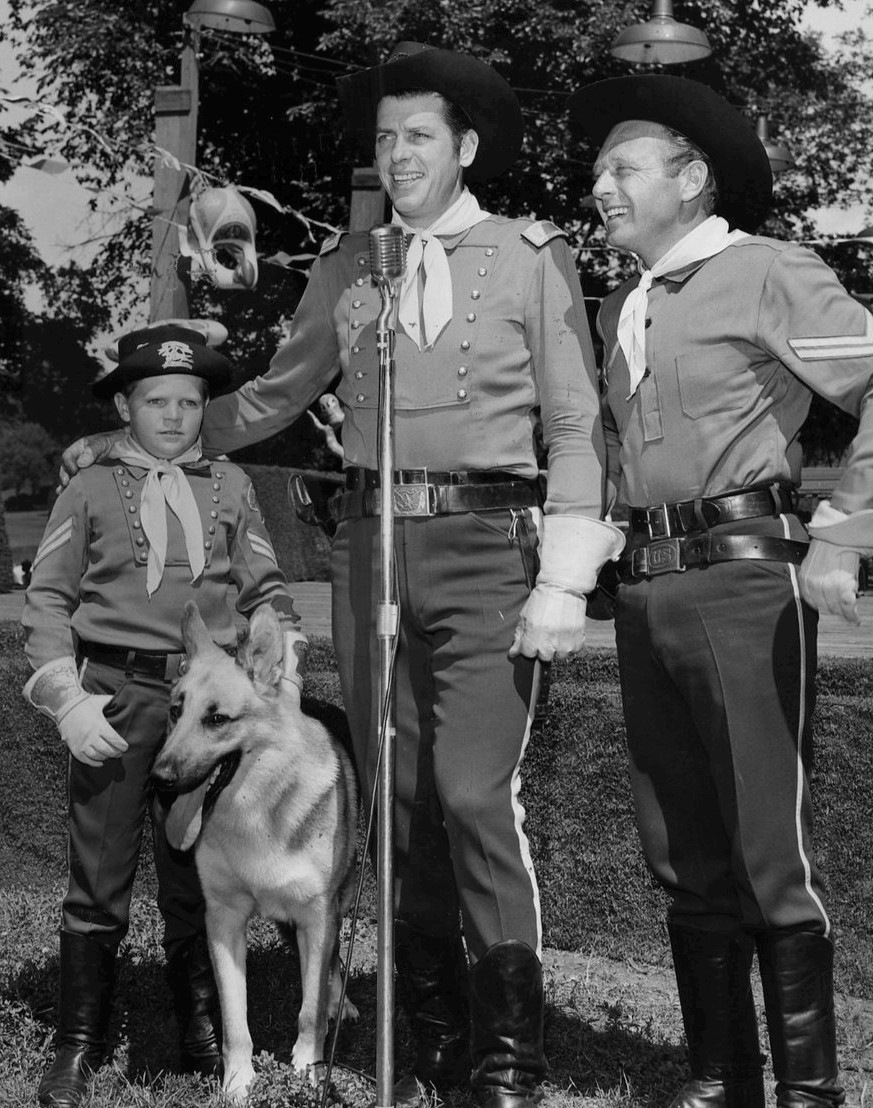
Brown (center) with Lee Aaker, Rin Tin Tin and Rand Brooks in The Adventures of Rin Tin Tin, 1956

In 1954, Brown joined the cast of the ABC western television series The Adventures of Rin Tin Tin, starring as Lt. Ripley Masters. After the series ended in 1959, he guest-starred in television programs including Gunsmoke, The Alfred Hitchcock Hour, Lassie (3 episodes), The Virginian, Laramie, Route 66, Barbary Coast, Daniel Boone, Bronco, Honey West and Murder, She Wrote.

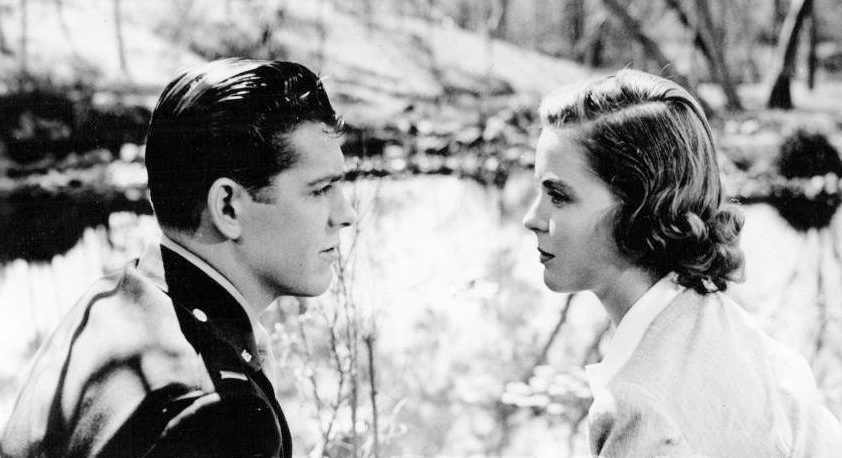
Brown (left) with Dorothy McGuire in Reward Unlimited, 1944

In the mid-1960s, Brown left acting, later founding a company making weight belts, eventually selling the company to Faberge. He returned to acting during the early 1970s, and from 1979 to 1988, he played the recurring role of Detective Harry McSween in 39 episodes of the soap opera television series Dallas.

== Death ==
Brown died on April 11, 1992 of lung cancer at his home in Woodland Hills, California, at the age of 72. He was cremated.
