= The Flight That Disappeared =

1961 film by Reginald LeBorg

- Theatrical release poster
- Directed by: Reginald LeBorg
- Written by: Ralph Hart; Judith Hart; Owen Harris
- Produced by: Robert E. Kent
- Starring: Craig Hill; Paula Raymond; Dayton Lummis
- Cinematography: Gilbert Warrenton
- Edited by: Kenneth Crane
- Music by: Richard LaSalle
- Production company: Harvard Film Corporation
- Distributed by: United Artists
- Release date: September 13, 1961
- Running time: 72 minutes
- Country: United States
- Language: English

The Flight That Disappeared (a.k.a. Flight That Disappeared) is a 1961 American science fiction film directed by Reginald LeBorg and produced by Robert E. Kent, starring Craig Hill, Paula Raymond, and Dayton Lummis. The film was released by United Artists. The film's storyline deals with an alien abduction. When his flight disappears, a rocket scientist finds himself on trial in the future for his part in designing a weapon that has destroyed all life on Earth.

== Plot ==
Trans-Coast Airways Flight 60 leaves Los Angeles on a flight to Washington, D.C. Three scientists on board the transcontinental flight have been summoned to a classified meeting at the Pentagon, concerning the "beta bomb", a new bomb design and the rocket to deliver it. Mid-flight, the Douglas DC-6 airliner mysteriously begins to climb, to over 10 miles high. Back at the airline headquarters, Operations Manager George Manson tries to keep in contact with the flight, but is sure that nothing can be done to save the passengers and crew.

The engines stop, and passengers pass out due to lack of oxygen. Crazed passenger Walter Cooper, who has tried to convince others that using the secret bomb is essential, jumps from the aircraft. Three scientists, Dr. Carl Morris, Tom Endicott, and Marcia Paxton, find themselves in a limbo state, watches stopped and no heartbeats.

Meeting the Examiner, the trio of scientists leave the aircraft for judgement from those of the future. They find themselves in a moment between time, which explains the stopped watches and lack of heartbeats. They are shown a future where their bomb has been used and destroyed the atmosphere, and thus all life on the planet. They are judged guilty and sentenced to live in the timeless moment, where the future and past meet, for the rest of eternity.

After the Sage objects that the scientists from the past cannot be judged by a future society, they are returned to the present on this technicality. The passengers have no memory of any of the actions on board before passing out, with the exception of Endicott the rocket engineer and Dr. Morris. Marcia Paxton only thinks that the event was a dream. Walter Cooper reappears, and the flight crew do not seem to have any recollection of the emergency that took place on the flight.

When Captain Hank Norton calls for landing instructions, the airline office is perplexed. When their airliner lands at Washington, the passengers and crew discover that they are 24 hours late, thus proving Endicott's fantastic story of the trial and judgement. Dr. Morris, the nuclear bomb designer, disposes of his notebook containing the formulas and designs for the bomb.

== Cast ==
- Craig Hill as Tom Endicott
- Paula Raymond as Marcia Paxton
- Dayton Lummis as Dr. Carl Morris
- Meg Wyllie as Helen Cooper
- Gregory Morton as The Examiner
- Harvey Stephens as Walter Cooper
- John Bryant as Hank Norton
- Nancy Hale as Barbara Nielsen
- Addison Richards as The Sage
- Brad Trumbull as Jack Peters
- Bernadette Hale as Joan Agnew
- Roy Engel as Jameson (credited as Roy Engle)

== Production ==
Conceived as a low-budget "message" film concerning "the perils of the nuclear arms race", director LeBorg was compelled to use stock footage for depictions of thermonuclear war.

The inflight scenes of The Flight That Disappeared were photographed in a studio-made airliner fuselage, passenger section, lounge and cockpit section, while background scenes were shot at Los Angeles Airport. (Note: The use of stock footage was problematic as the DC-6 airliner, at times, was shown as a Douglas DC-7, and even a Douglas DC-3.) The 2 by 2 seating is correct for the period, but the single aisle is wider, possibly to facilitate camera work. The picture was shot in eight days, "remarkable for a feature made in the 1960s".

The film was made at the nadir of LeBorg's career; he did not regard The Flight That Disappeared to be a genuine assignment: "I guess I just didn't get a film...I couldn't even get an agent."

== Reception ==
TV Guide gave the film two stars out of four, writing that The Flight That Disappeared becomes "more relevant with time". Aviation film historian Stephen Pendo, in his critique of this low-budget film, wrote, "The incredible plot makes the film all but unwatchable", and the poster showing a "jetliner" didn't help matters.

The Flight That Disappeared recouped its production costs at the box office, and garnered a small profit, then "vanished almost immediately after its initial release".

== See also ==
- List of American films of 1961

== Sources ==
- Dixon, Wheeler Winston. 1992. The Films of Reginald LeBorg: Interviews, Essays, and Filmography. Filmmakers No. 31 The Scarecrow Press, Metuchen, New Jersey. ISBN 0-8108-2550-3
- Pendo, Stephen. Aviation in the Cinema. Lanham, Maryland: Scarecrow Press, 1985. ISBN 0-8-1081-746-2.
- Warren, Bill. Keep Watching The Skies, American Science Fiction Movies of the 1950s, Vol II: 1958 - 1962 (covers late 1950s movies not released until the early 1960s). Jefferson, North Carolina: McFarland & Company, 1986. ISBN 0-89950-032-3.
