= Orville H. Hampton =

American screenwriter (1917–1997)

- Born: May 21, 1917; Rockford, Illinois, U.S.
- Died: August 8, 1997 (aged 80); Los Angeles, U.S.
- Resting place: Forest Lawn Memorial Park (Hollywood Hills)
- Other names: Owen Harris; Orville Hampton
- Education: University of Illinois Urbana-Champaign
- Occupation: Screenwriter
- Years active: 1950–1984

Orville H. Hampton (May 21, 1917 – August 8, 1997) was an American screenwriter who worked mostly in low-budget films, particularly for producers Robert E. Kent and Edward Small. A screenplay that he and Raphael Hayes wrote for One Potato, Two Potato (1964) was nominated for an Academy Award for Best Original Screenplay.

== Biography ==
Hampton was born in Rockford, Illinois, and attended the University of Illinois Urbana-Champaign, where he studied chemistry and journalism. After college, he worked as a radio announcer before serving in the Army during World War II. He worked with Maurice Evans while in the army entertainment section in Honolulu. He became a captain and was discharged in 1946.

Following the war, Hampton settled in Hollywood, where from 1950 onward he became a prolific screenwriter, scripting or co-writing more than 100 films and television episodes, mainly B-movies and genre films. In 1964, Hampton, along with co-writer Raphael Hayes, received an Academy Award nomination for Best Original Screenplay for One Potato, Two Potato.

During his long career, Hampton worked on television programs including The Lone Ranger, The Adventures of Champion, Perry Mason (and The New Perry Mason), Hawaii Five-O, Lassie, The Six Million Dollar Man and Mission: Impossible. Though he wrote films and television shows in many genres—including film noir (Motor Patrol), science fiction (The Atomic Submarine), crime fiction (Detroit 9000), horror (The Alligator People), blaxploitation (Friday Foster), mystery (Lady in the Fog aka Scotland Yard Inspector), and westerns (Gunfighters of Abilene)--, Hampton is probably best remembered for his scripts which addressed race relations, particularly One Potato, Two Potato (which depicts an interracial marriage in the 1960s) and his two films with director Arthur Marks, Detroit 9000 and Friday Foster (which starred Pam Grier, Yaphet Kotto, Eartha Kitt, Scatman Crothers and Carl Weathers).

Fellow screenwriter C. Jack Lewis recalled in his 2002 book White Horse, Black Hat, that Hampton used the pen name "Owen Harris" in his later career—when he was a regular writer for Columbia Pictures—in an effort to distance himself from his days a "Poverty Row screenwriter." He remembered Hampton as a writer who "wasn't too proud to work at something else, when necessary", pointing to Hampton's credits as dialogue supervisor, additional dialogue writer, and dialogue director in the 1950s.

Hampton died on August 8, 1997, in Malibu, California.

== Select Credits ==
- Rocketship X-M (1950) (additional dialogue)
- Lost Continent (1951) (uncredited)
- Outlaw Women (1952)
- Mesa of Lost Women (1953) (dialogue supervisor, uncredited writer)
- Lady in the Fog aka Scotland Yard Inspector (1952)
- The Big Chase (1954)
- New Orleans Uncensored (1955)
- The Three Outlaws (1956)
- Untamed Mistress (1956)
- Submarine Seahawk (1958)
- The Alligator People (1959)
- The Atomic Submarine (1959)
- A Dog's Best Friend (1960)
- The Flight that Disappeared (1961)
- Gunfighters of Abilene (1960)
- The Snake Woman (1961)
- The Underwater City (1962)
- Jack the Giant Killer (1962)
- One Potato, Two Potato (1965)
- The Young Runaways (1968)
- Detroit 9000 (1973)
- Friday Foster (1975)
- Fantasy Island (1978) (TV series)
