= Edward L. Cahn =

American film director (1899–1963)

Edward Linol Cahn
- Born: February 12, 1899; Brooklyn, New York, U.S.
- Died: August 25, 1963 (aged 64); Hollywood, California, U.S.
- Occupation: Film director

Edward L. Cahn (February 12, 1899 – August 25, 1963) was an American film director and editor.

== Early life and education ==
Cahn was born in Brooklyn, New York. He went to work at Universal Pictures in 1917 while still a student at UCLA.

== Career ==
He is best known for directing Our Gang comedies from 1939 to 1943, and a long line of other short subjects and B-movies afterward. He is also known for directing the 1958 film It! The Terror from Beyond Space, the film that inspired the 1979 film Alien. He made a number of films for American International Pictures.

== Personal life ==
His brother was film editor Philip Cahn, who was the father of film editor Dann Cahn who, in turn, was the father of film editor Daniel T. Cahn.

== Selected filmography as director ==
- The Homicide Squad (1931)
- Radio Patrol (1932)
- Law and Order (1932)
- Afraid to Talk (1932)
- Laughter in Hell (1933)
- Emergency Call (1933)
- Confidential (1935)
- Death Drives Through (1935)
- Hit and Run Driver (1935)
- A Thrill for Thelma (1935)
- Foolproof (1936)
- The Perfect Set-up (1936)
- Behind the Headlines (1936)
- Servant of the People: The Story of the Constitution of the United States (1937)
- Bad Guy (1937)
- Grid Rules (1938)
- Dad for a Day (1939)
- The Giant of Norway (1939)
- Angel of Mercy (1939)
- Alfalfa's Double (1939)
- Time Out for Lessons (1939)
- Redhead (1941)
- Main Street After Dark (1945)
- Dangerous Partners (1945)
- Gas House Kids in Hollywood (1947)
- Goodbye, Miss Turlock (1948) -- Oscar-winner for Best Short Subject (One-Reel)
- Experiment Alcatraz (1950) (and producer)
- Destination Murder (1950)
- Creature with the Atom Brain (1955)
- Girls in Prison (1956)
- The She-Creature (1956)
- Voodoo Woman (1957)
- Zombies of Mora Tau (1957)
- Invasion of the Saucer Men (1957)
- Curse of the Faceless Man (1958)
- It! The Terror from Beyond Space (1958)
- Pier 5, Havana (1958)
- The Four Skulls of Jonathan Drake (1959)
- Inside the Mafia (1959)
- Invisible Invaders (1959)
- A Dog's Best Friend (1959)
- Guns, Girls and Gangsters (1959)
- Vice Raid (1959)
- Operation Bottleneck (1961)
- Beauty and the Beast (1962)

== Editor ==
- Surrender (1927)
- The Man Who Laughs (1928)
- Broadway (1929) (associate editor)
- The White Hell of Pitz Palu (1929)
- The Last Performance (1929)
- All Quiet on the Western Front (1930)
