= List of film director–composer collaborations =

The following film directors and film score composers have worked together on at least five full-length projects, and were solely credited in their role, organized by name of the director.

== A ==
Lenny Abrahamson

- Stephen Rennicks
  - Adam & Paul (2004)
  - Garage (2007)
  - What Richard Did (2012)
  - Frank (2014)
  - Room (2015)
  - The Little Stranger (2018)

J. J. Abrams

- Michael Giacchino
  - Mission: Impossible III (2006)
  - Star Trek (2009)
  - Super 8 (2011)
  - Star Trek into Darkness (2013)
  - The Great Beyond (2026)

Andrew Adamson

- Harry Gregson-Williams
  - Shrek (2001)
  - Shrek 2 (2004)
  - The Chronicles of Narnia: The Lion, the Witch and the Wardrobe (2005)
  - The Chronicles of Narnia: Prince Caspian (2008)
  - Mr. Pip (2013)

Robert Aldrich

- Frank De Vol
  - World for Ransom (1954)
  - Kiss Me Deadly (1955)
  - The Big Knife (1955)
  - Attack (1956)
  - What Ever Happened to Baby Jane? (1962)
  - Hush... Hush, Sweet Charlotte (1964)
  - The Flight of the Phoenix (1965)
  - The Dirty Dozen (1967)
  - The Legend of Lylah Clare (1968)
  - Ulzana's Raid (1972)
  - Emperor of the North Pole (1973)
  - The Longest Yard (1974)
  - Hustle (1975)
  - The Choirboys (1977)
  - The Frisco Kid (1979)
  - ...All the Marbles (1981)

Irwin Allen

- Paul Sawtell & Bert Shefter
  - The Sea Around Us (1953)
  - The Animal World (1956)
  - The Story of Mankind (1957)
  - The Big Circus (1959)
  - The Lost World (1960)
  - Voyage to the Bottom of the Sea (1961)
  - Five Weeks in a Balloon (1962)
  - The Time Tunnel (1966)

Pedro Almodóvar

- Alberto Iglesias
  - The Flower of My Secret (1995)
  - Live Flesh (1997)
  - All About My Mother (1999)
  - Talk to Her (2002)
  - Bad Education (2004)
  - Volver (2006)
  - Broken Embraces (2009)
  - The Skin I Live In (2011)
  - I'm So Excited! (2013)
  - Julieta (2016)
  - Dolor y gloria (2019)
  - The Human Voice (2020)
  - Parallel Mothers (2021)
  - Strange Way of Life (2023)
  - The Room Next Door (2024)
  - Bitter Christmas (2026)

Jon Amiel

- Christopher Young
  - Copycat (1995)
  - The Man Who Knew Too Little (1997)
  - Entrapment (1999)
  - The Core (2003)
  - Creation (2009)

Paul Thomas Anderson

- Jonny Greenwood
  - There Will Be Blood (2007)
  - The Master (2012)
  - Inherent Vice (2014)
  - Phantom Thread (2017)
  - Licorice Pizza (2021)
  - One Battle After Another (2025)

Wes Anderson

- Alexandre Desplat
  - Fantastic Mr. Fox (2009)
  - Moonrise Kingdom (2012)
  - The Grand Budapest Hotel (2014)
  - Isle of Dogs (2018)
  - The French Dispatch (2021)
  - Asteroid City (2023)
  - The Phoenician Scheme (2025)

Theo Angelopoulos

- Eleni Karaindrou
  - Voyage to Cythera (1984)
  - The Beekeeper (1986)
  - Landscape in the Mist (1988)
  - The Suspended Step of the Stork (1991)
  - Ulysses' Gaze (1995)
  - Eternity and a Day (1998)
  - Trilogy: The Weeping Meadow (2004)
  - The Dust of Time (2008)

Hideaki Anno

- Shirō Sagisu
  - Neon Genesis Evangelion: Death & Rebirth (1997)
  - The End of Evangelion (1997)
  - Evangelion: 1.0 You Are (Not) Alone (2007)
  - Evangelion: 2.0 You Can (Not) Advance (2009)
  - Evangelion: 3.0 You Can (Not) Redo (2012)
  - Shin Godzilla (2016)
  - Evangelion: 3.0+1.0 Thrice Upon a Time (2021)

Michelangelo Antonioni

- Giovanni Fusco
  - Story of a Love Affair (1950)
  - The Lady Without Camelias (1953)
  - I vinti (1953)
  - Le Amiche (1955)
  - Il Grido (1957)
  - L'Avventura (1960)
  - L'Eclisse (1962)
  - Red Desert (1964)

Dario Argento

- Goblin
  - Deep Red (1975)
  - Suspiria (1977)
  - Tenebre (1982)
  - Phenomena (1985)
  - Sleepless (2001)
- Ennio Morricone
  - The Bird with the Crystal Plumage (1970)
  - The Cat o' Nine Tails (1971)
  - Four Flies on Grey Velvet (1971)
  - The Stendhal Syndrome (1995)
  - The Phantom of the Opera (1998)

Darren Aronofsky

- Clint Mansell
  - Pi (1998)
  - Requiem for a Dream (2000)
  - The Fountain (2006)
  - The Wrestler (2008)
  - Black Swan (2010)
  - Noah (2014)

Richard Attenborough

- George Fenton
  - Gandhi (1982)
  - Cry Freedom (1987)
  - Shadowlands (1993)
  - In love and War (1996)
  - Grey Owl (1997)

John G. Avildsen

- Bill Conti
  - Rocky (1976)
  - Slow Dancing in the Big City (1978)
  - The Formula (1980)
  - Neighbors (1981)
  - The Karate Kid (1984)
  - The Karate Kid Part II (1986)
  - Happy New Year (1987)
  - For Keeps (1988)
  - Lean on Me (1989)
  - The Karate Kid Part III (1989)
  - Rocky V (1990)
  - 8 Seconds (1994)
  - Inferno (1999)

== B ==
John Badham

- Arthur B. Rubinstein
  - Whose Life is it Anyway? (1981)
  - Blue Thunder (1983)
  - WarGames (1983)
  - Stakeout (1987)
  - The Hard Way (1991)
  - Another Stakeout (1993)
  - Nick of Time (1995)
- David Shire
  - The Impatient Heart (1971)
  - Isn't It Shocking? (1973)
  - The Godchild (1974)
  - Saturday Night Fever (1977)
  - Short Circuit (1986)

Charles Band

- Richard Band
  - Parasite (1982)
  - Metalstorm: The Destruction of Jared-Syn (1983)
  - The Alchemist (1983)
  - Crash and Burn (1990)
  - Josh Kirby... Time Warrior! (1995–1996)
  - Hideous! (1997)
  - Puppet Master: The Legacy (2003)
  - Skull Heads (2009)
  - Evil Bong 3D: The Wrath of Bong (2011)
  - Puppet Master X: Axis Rising (2012)
  - Unlucky Charms (2013)
  - Trophy Heads (2014)

Michael Bay

- Steve Jablonsky
  - The Island (2005)
  - Transformers (2007)
  - Transformers: Revenge of the Fallen (2009)
  - Transformers: Dark of the Moon (2011)
  - Pain & Gain (2013)
  - Transformers: Age of Extinction (2014)
  - Transformers: The Last Knight (2017)

Josh Becker

- Joseph LoDuca
  - Thou Shalt Not Kill... Except (1985)
  - Lunatics: A Love Story (1991)
  - Hercules in the Maze of the Minotaur (1994)
  - Running Time (1997)
  - Alien Apocalypse (2005)
  - Morning, Noon & Night (2018)

Bruce Beresford

- Georges Delerue
  - Crimes of the Heart (1986)
  - Her Alibi (1989)
  - Mister Johnson (1990)
  - Black Robe (1991)
  - Rich in Love (1992)

Ingmar Bergman

- Erlan von Koch
  - Crisis (1946)
  - It Rains on Our Love (1946)
  - A Ship Bound for India (1947)
  - Music in Darkness (1948)
  - Port of Call (1948)
  - Prison (1949)
- Erik Nordgren
  - Thirst (1949)
  - This Can't Happen Here (1950)
  - Summer Interlude (1951)
  - Waiting Women (1952)
  - Summer with Monika (1953)
  - Smiles of a Summer Night (1955)
  - The Seventh Seal (1957)
  - Wild Strawberries (1957)
  - Ansiktet (1958)
  - The Virgin Spring (1960)
  - The Devil's Eye (1960)
  - Through A Glass Darkly (1961)

Bernardo Bertolucci

- Ennio Morricone
  - Before the Revolution (1964)
  - Partner (1968)
  - 1900 (1976)
  - Luna (1979)
  - Tragedy of a Ridiculous Man (1981)

Luc Besson

- Éric Serra
  - Le Dernier Combat (1983)
  - Subway (1985)
  - Le Grand Bleu (1988)
  - Nikita (1990)
  - Atlantis (1991)
  - Léon (1994)
  - The Fifth Element (1997)
  - Messenger: The Story of Joan of Arc (1999)
  - Arthur and the Minimoys (2006)
  - Arthur and the Revenge of Maltazard (2009)
  - Arthur 3: The War of the Two Worlds (2010)
  - The Extraordinary Adventures of Adèle Blanc-Sec (2010)
  - The Lady (2011)
  - Lucy (2014)
  - Anna (2019)

Bharathiraja

- A. R. Rahman
  - Kizhakku Cheemayile (1993)
  - Karuththamma (1994)
  - Anthimanthaarai (1996)
  - Taj Mahal (1999)
  - Kangalal Kaidhu Sei (2003)

Brad Bird

- Michael Giacchino
  - The Incredibles (2004)
  - Ratatouille (2007)
  - Mission: Impossible – Ghost Protocol (2011)
  - Tomorrowland (2015)
  - Incredibles 2 (2018)
  - Ray Gunn (2026)

Gregg Bishop

- Kristopher Carter
  - The Other Side (2006)
  - Dance of the Dead (2008)
  - The Birds of Anger (2011)
  - Siren (2016)
  - Howl at the Dead (2023)
  - The Heretiks (2026)

Paul Bogart

- Arthur B. Rubinstein
  - The House Without a Christmas Tree (1972)
  - Look Homeward, Angel (1972)
  - The Thanksgiving Treasure (1973)
  - The Easter Promise (1975)
  - You Can't Take It with You (1979)

Mauro Bolognini

- Ennio Morricone
  - Le streghe (1967) English: "The Witches"
  - Arabella (1967)
  - L'assoluto naturale (1969)
  - Un bellissimo novembre (1969) English: "That Splendid November"
  - Metello (1970)
  - Chronicle of a Homicide (1972)
  - Drama of the Rich (1974) a.k.a. "The Murri Affair"
  - Libera, My Love (1975)
  - Down the Ancient Staircase (1975)
  - The Inheritance (1976)
  - Where Are You Going on Holiday? (1978)
  - The Lady of the Camellias (1980)
  - The Venetian Woman (1986)
  - Farewell Moscow (1987)
  - Gli indifferenti (1987) English: A Time of Indifference
  - Husband and Lovers (1991) Italian: "La villa del venerdi"

Uwe Boll

- Jessica de Rooij
  - Seed (2007)
  - In the Name of the King: A Dungeon Siege Tale (2007)
  - Postal (2007)
  - BloodRayne 2: Deliverance (2007)
  - 1968 Tunnel Rats (2008)
  - Rampage (2009)
  - Darfur (2009)
  - Max Schmeling (2010)
  - Auschwitz (2011)
  - BloodRayne: The Third Reich (2011)
  - Blubberella (2011)
  - In the Name of the King 2: Two Worlds (2011)
  - Assault on Wall Street (2013)
  - Capital Punishment (2014)
  - Rampage: President Down (2016)

Boulting Brothers

- John Addison
  - Seven Days to Noon (1950)
  - High Treason (1951)
  - Josephine and Men (1955)
  - Private's Progress (1956)
  - Lucky Jim (1957)
  - Carlton-Browne of the F.O. (1959)
  - A French Mistress (1960)

Kenneth Branagh

- Patrick Doyle
  - Henry V (1989)
  - Dead Again (1991)
  - Much Ado About Nothing (1993)
  - Mary Shelley's Frankenstein (1994)
  - Hamlet (1996)
  - Love's Labour's Lost (2000)
  - As You Like It (2006)
  - Sleuth (2007)
  - Thor (2011)
  - Jack Ryan: Shadow Recruit (2014)
  - Cinderella (2015)
  - Murder on the Orient Express (2017)
  - All is True (2018)
  - Artemis Fowl (2019)
  - Death on the Nile (2022)

Mel Brooks

- John Morris
  - The Producers (1968)
  - The Twelve Chairs (1970)
  - Young Frankenstein (1974)
  - Blazing Saddles (1974)
  - Silent Movie (1976)
  - High Anxiety (1977)
  - History of the World, Part I (1981)
  - Spaceballs (1987)
  - Life Stinks (1991)

Clarence Brown

- Herbert Stothart
  - The Son-Daughter (1932)
  - Night Flight (1933)
  - Chained (1934)
  - Anna Karenina (1935)
  - Ah, Wilderness! (1935)
  - Wife vs. Secretary (1936)
  - The Gorgeous Hussy (1936)
  - Conquest (1937)
  - Of Human Hearts (1938)
  - Idiot's Delight (1939)
  - Edison, the Man (1940)
  - Come Live with Me (1941)
  - They Met in Bombay (1941)
  - The Human Comedy (1943)
  - The White Cliffs of Dover (1944)
  - National Velvet (1944)
  - The Yearling (1946)

Luis Buñuel

- Raúl Lavista
  - Susana (1951)
  - A Woman Without Love (1952)
  - El bruto (1953)
  - Wuthering Heights (1953)
  - The River and Death (1954)
  - The Exterminating Angel (1962)

Jeff Burr

- Jim Manzie
  - From a Whisper to a Scream (1987)
  - Stepfather II (1989)
  - Leatherface: The Texas Chainsaw Massacre III (1990)
  - Pumpkinhead II: Blood Wings (1994)
  - Night of the Scarecrow (1995)

Tim Burton

- Danny Elfman
  - Pee-Wee's Big Adventure (1985)
  - Beetlejuice (1988)
  - Batman (1989)
  - Edward Scissorhands (1990)
  - Batman Returns (1992)
  - Mars Attacks! (1996)
  - Sleepy Hollow (1999)
  - Planet of the Apes (2001)
  - Big Fish (2003)
  - Charlie and the Chocolate Factory (2005)
  - Alice in Wonderland (2010)
  - Dark Shadows (2012)
  - Frankenweenie (2012)
  - Big Eyes (2014)
  - Dumbo (2019)
  - Beetlejuice Beetlejuice (2024)

== C ==
Edward L. Cahn

- Richard LaSalle
  - Boy Who Caught a Crook (1961)
  - When the Clock Strikes (1961)
  - You Have to Run Fast (1961)
  - Secret of Deep Harbor (1961)
  - Gun Street (1961)
  - The Clown and the Kid (1961)
  - Incident in an Alley (1962)
- Paul Sawtell & Bert Shefter
  - It! The Terror from Beyond Space (1958)
  - Pier 5, Havana (1959)
  - A Dog's Best Friend (1959)
  - Vice Raid (1960)
  - Cage of Evil (1960)
  - The Music Box Kid (1960)
  - Noose for a Gunman (1960)
  - Three Came to Kill (1960)
  - The Walking Target (1960)
  - Frontier Uprising (1961)
  - Five Guns to Tombstone (1961)
  - The Police Dog Story (1961)
  - Operation Bottleneck (1961)
  - Gun Fight (1961)
  - The Gambler Wore a Gun (1961)
- Ronald Stein
  - Girls in Prison (1956)
  - The She-Creature (1956)
  - Shake, Rattle & Rock! (1956)
  - Runaway Daughters (1956)
  - Flesh and the Spur (1956)
  - Dragstrip Girl (1957)
  - Invasion of the Saucer Men (1957)
  - Jet Attack (1958)
  - Suicide Battalion (1958)

Frank Capra

- Dimitri Tiomkin
  - Lost Horizon (1937)
  - You Can't Take It with You (1938)
  - Mr. Smith Goes to Washington (1939)
  - Meet John Doe (1941)
  - The Battle of Russia (1943)
  - The Battle of China (1944)
  - It's a Wonderful Life (1946)

D.J. Caruso

- Brian Tyler
  - Eagle Eye (2008)
  - Standing Up (2013)
  - The Disappointments Room (2016)
  - xXx: The Return of Xander Cage (2017)
  - Redeeming Love (2022)

Nick Cassavetes

- Aaron Zigman
  - John Q. (2002)
  - The Notebook (2004)
  - Alpha Dog (2006)
  - My Sister's Keeper (2009)
  - Yellow (2012)
  - The Other Woman (2014)
  - God Is a Bullet (2023)

Enzo G. Castellari

- Guido De Angelis & Maurizio De Angelis
  - Sting of the West (1972)
  - High Crime (1973)
  - Street Law (1974)
  - Cipolla Colt (1975)
  - The Big Racket (1976)
  - Keoma (1976)
  - The House by the Edge of the Lake (1979)
  - The Shark Hunter (1979)
  - The Last Shark (1981)
  - Light Blast (1985)
- Francesco De Masi
  - Renegade Riders (1967)
  - Any Gun Can Play (1968)
  - Johnny Hamlet (1968)
  - Kill Them All and Come Back Alone (1968)
  - Eagles Over London (1969)
  - Hector the Mighty (1972)
  - The Inglorious Bastards (1978)
  - Escape from the Bronx (1983)
  - Eagles Over London (1969)

Nick Castle

- Craig Safan
  - Tag: The Assassination Game (1982)
  - The Last Starfighter (1984)
  - Major Payne (1995)
  - Mr. Wrong (1996)
  - Delivering Milo (2001)
  - 'Twas the Night (2001)

Damien Chazelle

- Justin Hurwitz
  - Guy and Madeline on a Park Bench (2009)
  - Whiplash (2014)
  - La La Land (2016)
  - First Man (2018)
  - Babylon (2022)

Bob Clark

- Paul Zaza
  - Turk 182! (1985)
  - From the Hip (1987)
  - Loose Cannons (1990)
  - It Runs in the Family (1994)
  - Baby Geniuses (1999)
  - I'll Remember April (1999)
  - Now & Forever (2002)
  - Superbabies: Baby Geniuses 2 (2004)

George Clooney

- Alexandre Desplat
  - The Ides of March (2011)
  - The Monuments Men (2014)
  - Suburbicon (2017)
  - The Midnight Sky (2020)
  - The Boys in the Boat (2023)

Jean Cocteau

- Georges Auric
  - The Blood of a Poet (1930)
  - Beauty and the Beast (1946)
  - The Eagle with Two Heads (1948)
  - Les Parents terribles (1948)
  - Orpheus (1950)

Coen Brothers

- Carter Burwell
  - Blood Simple (1984)
  - Raising Arizona (1987)
  - Miller's Crossing (1990)
  - Barton Fink (1991)
  - The Hudsucker Proxy (1994)
  - Fargo (1996)
  - The Big Lebowski (1998)
  - The Man Who Wasn't There (2001)
  - Intolerable Cruelty (2003)
  - The Ladykillers (2004)
  - No Country for Old Men (2007)
  - Burn After Reading (2008)
  - A Serious Man (2009)
  - True Grit (2010)
  - Hail, Caesar! (2016)
  - The Ballad of Buster Scruggs (2018)
  - The Tragedy of Macbeth (2021, Joel only)
  - Drive-Away Dolls (2024, Ethan only)
  - Honey Don't! (2025, Ethan only)
  - Jack of Spades (2026, Joel only)

Rob Cohen

- Randy Edelman
  - Dragon: The Bruce Lee Story (1993)
  - Dragonheart (1996)
  - Daylight (1996)
  - The Skulls (2000)
  - xXx (2002)
  - The Mummy: Tomb of the Dragon Emperor (2008)
  - The Boy Next Door (2015)

Chris Columbus

- John Williams
  - Home Alone (1990)
  - Home Alone 2: Lost in New York (1992)
  - Stepmom (1998)
  - Harry Potter and the Philosopher's Stone (2001)
  - Harry Potter and the Chamber of Secrets (2002)

Bill Condon

- Carter Burwell
  - Gods and Monsters (1998)
  - Kinsey (2004)
  - The Twilight Saga: Breaking Dawn – Part 1 (2011)
  - The Twilight Saga: Breaking Dawn – Part 2 (2012)
  - The Fifth Estate (2013)
  - Mr. Holmes (2015)
  - The Good Liar (2019)
- Philip Giffin
  - White Lie (1991)
  - Red Wind (1991)
  - Dead in the Water (1991)
  - Murder 101 (1991)
  - Deadly Relations (1993)

James L. Conway

- Bob Summers
  - In Search of Noah's Ark (1976)
  - The Life and Times of Grizzly Adams (1977 to 1978)
  - The Lincoln Conspiracy (1977)
  - Beyond and Back (1978)
  - Donner Pass: The Road to Survival (1978)
  - Hangar 18 (1980)
  - Earthbound (1981)
  - The Boogens (1981)

Ryan Coogler

- Ludwig Göransson
  - Fruitvale Station (2013)
  - Creed (2015)
  - Black Panther (2018)
  - Black Panther: Wakanda Forever (2022)
  - Sinners (2025)

Francis Ford Coppola

- Carmine Coppola
  - Tonight for Sure (1962)
  - The Godfather Part II (1974)
  - Apocalypse Now (1979)
  - The Outsiders (1983)
  - Gardens of Stone (1987)
  - New York Stories (1989)
  - The Godfather Part III (1990)

Frank Coraci

- Rupert Gregson-Williams
  - Click (2006)
  - Zookeeper (2011)
  - Here Comes the Boom (2012)
  - Blended (2014)
  - The Ridiculous 6 (2015)
  - Hot Air (2018)

Roger Corman

- Les Baxter
  - House of Usher (1960)
  - Pit and the Pendulum (1961)
  - Tales of Terror (1962)
  - The Young Racers (1963)
  - The Raven (1963)
  - X: The Man with the X-Ray Eyes (1963)
  - Target: Harry (1969)
- Fred Katz
  - A Bucket of Blood (1959)
  - The Wasp Woman (1959)
  - Ski Troop Attack (1960)
  - The Little Shop of Horrors (1960)
  - Creature from the Haunted Sea (1961)
- Ronald Stein
  - Apache Woman (1955)
  - Day the World Ended (1955)
  - The Oklahoma Woman (1956)
  - Gunslinger (1956)
  - It Conquered the World (1956)
  - Naked Paradise (1957)
  - Not of This Earth (1957)
  - Attack of the Crab Monsters (1957)
  - The Undead (1957)
  - Sorority Girl (1957)
  - She Gods of Shark Reef (1958)
  - Last Woman on Earth (1960)
  - Atlas (1961)
  - The Premature Burial (1962)
  - The Terror (1963)
  - The Haunted Palace (1963)

Alex Cox

- Pray for Rain
  - Sid and Nancy (1986)
  - Straight to Hell (1986)
  - Death and the Compass (1992)
  - Three Businessmen (1998)
  - Searchers 2.0 (2007)
  - Repo Chick (2009)

Wes Craven

- Marco Beltrami
  - Scream (1996)
  - Scream 2 (1997)
  - Scream 3 (2000)
  - Cursed (2005)
  - Red Eye (2005)
  - My Soul to Take (2010)
  - Scream 4 (2011)

Destin Daniel Cretton

- Joel P. West
  - I Am Not a Hipster (2012)
  - Short Term 12 (2013)
  - The Glass Castle (2017)
  - Just Mercy (2019)
  - Shang-Chi and the Legend of the Ten Rings (2021)

John Cromwell

- Max Steiner
  - The Silver Cord (1933)
  - Double Harness (1933)
  - Spitfire (1934)
  - This Man Is Mine (1934)
  - Of Human Bondage (1934)
  - The Fountain (1934)
  - Little Lord Fauntleroy (1936)
  - Since You Went Away (1944)
  - Caged (1950)

David Cronenberg

- Howard Shore
  - The Brood (1979)
  - Scanners (1981)
  - Videodrome (1983)
  - The Fly (1986)
  - Dead Ringers (1988)
  - Naked Lunch (1991)
  - M. Butterfly (1993)
  - Crash (1996)
  - Existenz (1999)
  - Spider (2002)
  - A History of Violence (2005)
  - Eastern Promises (2007)
  - A Dangerous Method (2011)
  - Cosmopolis (2011)
  - Maps to the Stars (2014)
  - Crimes of the Future (2022)
  - The Shrouds (2024)

George Cukor

- Max Steiner
  - A Bill of Divorcement (1932)
  - Rockabye (1932)
  - What Price Hollywood? (1932)
  - Little Women (1933)
  - Our Betters (1933)

Irving Cummings

- Cyril J. Mockridge
  - Poor Little Rich Girl (1936)
  - Hollywood Cavalcade (1939)
  - Lillian Russell (1940)
  - Down Argentine Way (1940)
  - Belle Starr (1941)

Sean S. Cunningham

- Harry Manfredini
  - Here Come the Tigers (1978)
  - Manny's Orphans (1978)
  - Friday the 13th (1980)
  - Spring Break (1983)
  - Deepstar Six (1989)
  - XCU: Extreme Close Up (2001)

Michael Curtiz

- Bernhard Kaun
  - The Woman from Monte Carlo (1932)
  - The Strange Love of Molly Louvain (1932)
  - Doctor X (1932)
  - 20,000 Years in Sing Sing (1932)
  - Alias the Doctor (1932)
  - The Kennel Murder Case (1933)
  - Private Detective 62 (1933)
  - Jimmy the Gent (1934)
  - British Agent (1934)
  - Black Fury (1935)
  - The Case of the Curious Bride (1935)
- Heinz Roemheld
  - Mandalay (1934)
  - Captain Blood (1935)
  - Little Big Shot (1935)
  - Front Page Woman (1935)
  - Marked Woman (1937)
  - Four Mothers (1941)
  - Janie (1944)
- Max Steiner
  - The Charge of the Light Brigade (1936)
  - Four Daughters (1938)
  - Angels with Dirty Faces (1938)
  - Gold is Where You Find It (1938)
  - Dodge City (1939)
  - Daughters Courageous (1939)
  - Four Wives (1939)
  - Santa Fe Trail (1940)
  - Virginia City (1940)
  - Dive Bomber (1941)
  - Captains of the Clouds (1942)
  - Casablanca (1942)
  - Yankee Doodle Dandy (1942)
  - Mission to Moscow (1943)
  - This Is The Army (1943)
  - Passage to Marseille (1944)
  - Mildred Pierce (1945)
  - Life with Father (1947)
  - The Breaking Point (1950)
  - Force of Arms (1951)
  - The Boy from Oklahoma (1954)

== D ==
Rod Daniel

- Miles Goodman
  - Teen Wolf (1985)
  - Carly Mills (1986)
  - Like Father Like Son (1987)
  - K-9 (1989)
  - The Super (1991)

Joe Dante

- Jerry Goldsmith
  - Gremlins (1984)
  - Explorers (1985)
  - Innerspace (1987)
  - The 'Burbs (1989)
  - Gremlins 2: The New Batch (1990)
  - Matinee (1993)
  - Small Soldiers (1998)
  - Looney Tunes: Back in Action (2003)

Delmer Daves

- Max Steiner
  - A Kiss in the Dark (1949)
  - The Hanging Tree (1959)
  - A Summer Place (1959)
  - Parrish (1961)
  - Susan Slade (1961)
  - Rome Adventure (1962)
  - Spencer's Mountain (1963)
  - Youngblood Hawke (1964)
- Franz Waxman
  - Destination Tokyo (1943)
  - The Very Thought of You (1944)
  - Pride of the Marines (1945)
  - Dark Passage (1947)
  - Task Force (1949)
  - Demetrius and the Gladiators (1954)

Alberto De Martino

- Bruno Nicolai
  - $100,000 for Ringo (1965)
  - The Spy with Ten Faces (1966)
  - Django Shoots First (1966)
  - Special Mission Lady Chaplin (1966)
  - Carnal Circuit (1969)

Claire Denis

- Stuart Staples
  - The Intruder (2004)
  - White Material (2009)
  - Bastards (2013)
  - Let the Sunshine In (2017)
  - High Life (2018)

Philippe de Broca

- Georges Delerue
  - The Love Game (1960)
  - The Joker (1960)
  - Five Day Lover (1961)
  - Cartouche (1962)
  - That Man from Rio (1964)
  - Male Companion (1964)
  - Up to His Ears (1965)
  - King of Hearts (1966)
  - The Devil by the Tail (1969)
  - Give Her the Moon (1970)
  - Dear Louise (1972)
  - Incorrigible (1975)
  - Julie Gluepot (1977)
  - Dear Detective (1978)
  - Practice Makes Perfect (1979)
  - The African (1983)
  - Chouans! (1988)

Álex de la Iglesia

- Roque Baños
  - Muertos de risa (Dying of Laughter, 1999)
  - La comunidad (Common Wealth, 2000)
  - 800 balas (800 Bullets, 2002)
  - Crimen ferpecto (Perfect Crime, 2004)
  - The Oxford Murders (2008)
  - Balada Triste de Trompeta (The Last Circus, 2010)

Brian De Palma

- Pino Donaggio
  - Carrie (1976)
  - Home Movies (1979)
  - Dressed to Kill (1980)
  - Blow Out (1981)
  - Body Double (1984)
  - Raising Cain (1992)
  - Passion (2012)
  - Domino (2018)

Jacques Demy

- Michel Legrand
  - Lola (1961)
  - Bay of Angels (1963)
  - The Umbrellas of Cherbourg (1964)
  - The Young Girls of Rochefort (1967)
  - Donkey Skin (1970)
  - A Slightly Pregnant Man (1973)
  - Lady Oscar (1979)
  - Parking (1985)
  - Three Seats for the 26th (1988)

Jacques Deray

- Claude Bolling
  - Borsalino (1970)
  - Easy, Down There! (1971)
  - Borsalino & Co. (1974)
  - Flic Story (1975)
  - Butterfly on the Shoulder (1978)
  - Three Men to Kill (1980)
  - Les Secrets de la princesse de Cadignan (1982)
  - Credo (1983)
  - He Died with His Eyes Open (1985)
  - Netchaiev est de retour (1991)
  - Une femme explosive (1996)
  - Lettre d'une inconnue (2002)

Danny DeVito

- David Newman
  - Throw Momma from the Train (1987)
  - The War of the Roses (1989)
  - Hoffa (1992)
  - Matilda (1996)
  - Death to Smoochy (2002)
  - Duplex (2003)

Tom DiCillo

- Jim Farmer
  - Johnny Suede (1991)
  - Living in Oblivion (1995)
  - Box of Moonlight (1996)
  - The Real Blonde (1997)
  - Double Whammy (2001)

William Dieterle

- Victor Young
  - Love Letters (1945)
  - The Searching Wind (1946)
  - The Accused (1949)
  - Paid in Full (1950)
  - September Affair (1950)
  - Omar Khayyam (1957)

Edward Dmytryk

- Roy Webb
  - Seven Miles from Alcatraz (1942)
  - Hitler's Children (1943)
  - The Falcon Strikes Back (1943)
  - Behind the Rising Sun (1943)
  - Murder, My Sweet (1944)
  - Back to Bataan (1945)
  - Cornered (1945)
  - Crossfire (1947)

Roger Donaldson

- J. Peter Robinson
  - Cocktail (1988)
  - Cadillac Man (1990)
  - The World's Fastest Indian (2005)
  - The Bank Job (2008)
  - Seeking Justice (2011)
  - McLaren (2017)

Gordon Douglas

- Max Steiner
  - I Was a Communist for the FBI (1951)
  - Mara Maru (1952)
  - The Iron Mistress (1952)
  - The Charge at Feather River (1953)
  - So This Is Love (1953)
  - The McConnell Story (1955)
  - Fort Dobbs (1958)
  - The Sins of Rachel Cade (1961)

Dennis Dugan

- Rupert Gregson-Williams
  - I Now Pronounce You Chuck and Larry (2007)
  - You Don't Mess with the Zohan (2008)
  - Grown Ups (2010)
  - Just Go With It (2011)
  - Jack and Jill (2011)
  - Grown Ups 2 (2013)

Christian Duguay

- Normand Corbeil
  - Screamers (1995)
  - The Assignment (1997)
  - The Art of War (2000)
  - Extreme Ops (2002)
  - Boot Camp (2008)

== E ==
Clint Eastwood

- Lennie Niehaus
  - Pale Rider (1985)
  - Heartbreak Ridge (1986)
  - Bird (1988)
  - White Hunter, Black Heart (1990)
  - The Rookie (1990)
  - Unforgiven (1992)
  - A Perfect World (1993)
  - The Bridges of Madison County (1995)
  - Absolute Power (1997)
  - Midnight in the Garden of Good and Evil (1997)
  - True Crime (1999)
  - Space Cowboys (2000)
  - Blood Work (2002)
  - Mystic River (2003)
  - Million Dollar Baby (2004)
  - Flags of Our Fathers (2006)
  - Letters from Iwo Jima (2006)
  - Changeling (2008)
  - Gran Torino (2008)

Blake Edwards

- Henry Mancini
  - High Time (1960)
  - Experiment in Terror (1962)
  - A Shot in the Dark (1964)
  - What Did You Do in the War, Daddy? (1966)
  - Gunn (1967)
  - The Party (1968)
  - The Return of the Pink Panther (1975)
  - The Pink Panther Strikes Again (1976)
  - Revenge of the Pink Panther (1978)
  - 10 (1979)
  - S.O.B. (1981)
  - Trail of the Pink Panther (1982)
  - Curse of the Pink Panther (1983)
  - The Man Who Loved Women (1983)
  - A Fine Mess (1986)
  - That's Life! (1986)
  - Blind Date (1987)
  - Justin Case (1988)
  - Sunset (1988)
  - Peter Gunn (1989)
  - Skin Deep (1989)
  - Switch (1991)
  - Son of the Pink Panther (1993)

Atom Egoyan

- Mychael Danna
  - Family Viewing (1987)
  - Speaking Parts (1989)
  - The Adjuster (1991)
  - Exotica (1994)
  - The Sweet Hereafter (1997)
  - Felicia's Journey (1999)
  - Ararat (2002)
  - Where the Truth Lies (2005)
  - Adoration (2008)
  - Chloe (2009)
  - Devil's Knot (2013)
  - The Captive (2014)
  - Remember (2015)
  - Guest of Honour (2019)

Stephan Elliot

- Guy Gross
  - Frauds (1993)
  - The Adventures of Priscilla, Queen of the Desert (1994)
  - Welcome to Woop Woop (1997)
  - A Few Best Men (2011)
  - Swinging Safari (2017)

Roland Emmerich

- Harald Kloser
  - The Thirteenth Floor (1999)
  - The Day After Tomorrow (2004)
  - 10,000 BC (2008)
  - 2012 (2009)
  - Anonymous (2011)
  - White House Down (2013)
  - Independence Day: Resurgence (2016)
  - Midway (2019)

== F ==
Roberto Faenza

- Ennio Morricone
  - Escalation (1968)
  - Si salvi chi vuole (1980)
  - Copkiller (1986)
  - The Bachelor (1990)
  - Jonah Who Lived in the Whale (1993)
  - Sostiene Pereira (1995)

Rainer Werner Fassbinder

- Peer Raben
  - Love Is Colder Than Death (1969)
  - Katzelmacher (1969)
  - The American Soldier (1970)
  - Gods of the Plague (1970)
  - The Niklashausen Journey (1970)
  - Whity (1971)
  - Rio das Mortes (1971)
  - Beware of a Holy Whore (1971)
  - Pioneers in Ingolstadt (1971)
  - Jail Bait (1972)
  - Fox and His Friends (1974)
  - Fear of Fear (1975)
  - Mother Küsters' Trip to Heaven (1975)
  - Satan's Brew (1976)
  - I Only Want You To Love Me (1976)
  - Chinese Roulette (1976)
  - The Stationmaster's Wife (1977)
  - The Marriage of Maria Braun (1978)
  - In a Year of 13 Moons (1978)
  - Despair (1978)
  - The Third Generation (1979)
  - Berlin Alexanderplatz (1980)
  - Lola (1981)
  - Lili Marleen (1981)
  - Veronika Voss (1982)
  - Querelle (1982)

Paul Feig

- Theodore Shapiro
  - Spy (2015)
  - Ghostbusters (2016)
  - Snatched (2017)
  - A Simple Favor (2018)
  - Last Christmas (2019)
  - The School for Good and Evil (2022)
  - Another Simple Favor (2025)

Federico Fellini

- Nino Rota
  - The White Sheik (1952)
  - I Vitelloni (1953)
  - La Strada (1954)
  - Il Bidone (1955)
  - Nights of Cabiria (1957)
  - La Dolce Vita (1960)
  - 8½ (1963)
  - Juliet of the Spirits (1965)
  - Fellini Satyricon (1969)
  - Fellini: A Director's Notebook (1969)
  - The Clowns (1970)
  - Roma (1972)
  - Amarcord (1973)
  - Fellini's Casanova (1976)
  - Federico Fellini's Orchestra Rehearsal (1978)

Abel Ferrara

- Joe Delia
  - 9 Lives of a Wet Pussy (1976)
  - The Driller Killer (1979)
  - Ms. 45 (1981)
  - China Girl (1987)
  - King of New York (1990)
  - Bad Lieutenant (1992)
  - Body Snatchers (1993)
  - Dangerous Game (1993)
  - The Addiction (1995)
  - The Funeral (1996)
  - The Blackout (1997)
  - Alive in France (2017)
  - Piazza Vittorio (2017)
  - Tommaso (2019)
  - Siberia (2020)

Andy Fickman

- Nathan Wang
  - Who's Your Daddy? (2004)
  - Reefer Madness: The Movie Musical (2005)
  - She's the Man (2006)
  - The Game Plan (2007)
  - You Again (2010)
  - Playing with Fire (2019)
  - One True Loves (2023)

Eduardo De Filippo

- Nino Rota
  - Side Street Story (1950)
  - Filomena Marturano (1951)
  - Ragazze da marito (1952)
  - Marito e moglie (1952)
  - Fortunella (1958)

David Fincher

- Trent Reznor and Atticus Ross
  - The Social Network (2010)
  - The Girl with the Dragon Tattoo (2011)
  - Gone Girl (2014)
  - Mank (2020)
  - The Killer (2023)
  - The Further Mis-Adventures of Cliff Booth (2026)

Terence Fisher

- James Bernard
  - The Curse of Frankenstein (1957)
  - Horror of Dracula (1958)
  - The Hound of the Baskervilles (1959)
  - The Stranglers of Bombay (1959)
  - The Gorgon (1964)
  - Dracula: Prince of Darkness (1966)
  - Frankenstein Created Woman (1967)
  - The Devil Rides Out (1968)
  - Frankenstein Must Be Destroyed (1969)
  - Frankenstein and the Monster from Hell (1974)

Mike Flanagan

- The Newton Brothers
  - Oculus (2013)
  - Hush (2016)
  - Before I Wake (2016)
  - Ouija: Origin of Evil (2016)
  - Gerald's Game (2017)
  - Doctor Sleep (2019)
  - The Life of Chuck (2024)

Gary Fleder

- Mark Isham
  - Kiss the Girls (1997)
  - Don't Say a Word (2001)
  - Impostor (2001)
  - The Bachelor (2008)
  - Homefront (2013)'

Victor Fleming

- Herbert Stothart
  - The White Sister (1933)
  - Treasure Island (1934)
  - The Good Earth (1937)
  - The Wizard of Oz (1939)
  - A Guy Named Joe (1943)
  - Adventure (1945)

Bryan Forbes

- John Barry
  - The L-Shaped Room (1962)
  - Seance on a Wet Afternoon (1964)
  - King Rat (1965)
  - The Wrong Box (1966)
  - The Whisperers (1967)
  - Deadfall (1968)

John Ford

- Alfred Newman
  - Arrowsmith (1931)
  - Flesh (1932)
  - Wee Willie Winkie (1937)
  - The Hurricane (1937)
  - Young Mr. Lincoln (1939)
  - Drums Along the Mohawk (1939)
  - The Grapes of Wrath (1940)
  - How Green Was My Valley (1941)
  - December 7th (1943)
  - When Willie Comes Marching Home (1950)
  - What Price Glory (1952)
- Cyril J. Mockridge
  - The World Moves On (1934)
  - Judge Priest (1934)
  - My Darling Clementine (1946)
  - The Man Who Shot Liberty Valance (1962)
  - Donovan's Reef (1963)
- Richard Hageman
  - The Long Voyage Home (1940)
  - The Fugitive (1947)
  - Fort Apache (1948)
  - 3 Godfathers (1948)
  - She Wore a Yellow Ribbon (1949)
  - Wagon Master (1950)

Georges Franju

- Maurice Jarre
  - La Tête contre les murs (1958)
  - Les Yeux sans visage (1960)
  - Pleins feux sur l'assassin (1961)
  - Thérèse Desqueyroux
  - Judex (1963)

David Frankel

- Theodore Shapiro
  - The Devil Wears Prada (2006)
  - Marley & Me (2008)
  - The Big Year (2011)
  - Hope Springs (2012)
  - One Chance (2013)
  - Collateral Beauty (2016)

Stephen Frears

- Alexandre Desplat
  - The Queen (2006)
  - Chéri (2009)
  - Tamara Drewe (2010)
  - Philomena (2013)
  - Florence Foster Jenkins (2016)
  - The Lost King (2022)

Lucio Fulci

- Fabio Frizzi
  - Zombi 2 (1979)
  - Contraband (1980)
  - City of the Living Dead (1980)
  - The Beyond (1981)
  - Manhattan Baby (1982)
  - A Cat in the Brain (1990)

Samuel Fuller

- Harry Sukman
  - Forty Guns (1957)
  - Verboten! (1959)
  - The Crimson Kimono (1959)
  - Underworld U.S.A. (1961)
  - Merrill's Marauders (1962)

== G ==
Rodrigo Garcia

- Edward Shearmur
  - Things You Can Tell Just by Looking at Her (2000)
  - Nine Lives (2005)
  - Passengers (2008)
  - Mother and Child (2009)
  - Four Good Days (2020)

Philippe Garrel

- Jean-Louis Aubert
  - Jealousy (2013)
  - In the Shadow of Women (2015)
  - Lover for a Day (2017)
  - The Salt of Tears (2020)
  - The Plough (2023)

Bert I. Gordon

- Albert Glasser
  - Beginning of the End (1957)
  - The Cyclops (1957)
  - The Amazing Colossal Man (1957)
  - Attack of the Puppet People (1958)
  - War of the Colossal Beast (1958)
  - Earth vs. The Spider (1958)
  - The Boy and the Pirates (1960)
  - Tormented (1960)

James Goldstone

- Dave Grusin
  - A Man Called Gannon (1968)
  - Winning (1969)
  - The Gang That Couldn't Shoot Straight (1971)
  - Eric (1975)
  - The Sad and Lonely Sundays (1976)

Stuart Gordon

- Richard Band
  - Re-Animator (1985)
  - From Beyond (1986)
  - The Pit and the Pendulum (1991)
  - Castle Freak (1995)
  - Masters of Horror (2005)- H. P. Lovecraft's Dreams in the Witch-House

Peter Greenaway

- Michael Nyman
  - Vertical Features Remake (1978)
  - The Falls (1980)
  - The Draughtsman's Contract (1982)
  - A Zed and Two Noughts (1985)
  - Drowning by Numbers (1988)
  - The Cook, the Thief, His Wife & Her Lover (1989)
  - Prospero's Books (1990)

Paul Greengrass

- John Powell
  - The Bourne Supremacy (2004)
  - United 93 (2006)
  - The Bourne Ultimatum (2007)
  - Green Zone (2010)
  - Jason Bourne (2016)

== H ==
John Hamburg

- Theodore Shapiro
  - Safe Men (1998)
  - Along Came Polly (2004)
  - I Love You, Man (2009)
  - Why Him? (2016)
  - Focker-in-Law (2026)

Guy Hamilton

- John Barry
  - Man in the Middle (1964)
  - Goldfinger (1964)
  - The Party's Over (1965)
  - Diamonds Are Forever (1971)
  - The Man with the Golden Gun (1974)

Anthony Harvey

- John Barry
  - Dutchman (1966)
  - The Lion in Winter (1968)
  - They Might Be Giants (1971)
  - The Glass Menagerie (1973)
  - Svengali (1983)

Henry Hathaway

- Alfred Newman
  - The Real Glory (1939)
  - Brigham Young (1940)
  - Ten Gentlemen from West Point (1942)
  - Call Northside 777 (1948)
  - Down to the Sea in Ships (1949)
  - Fourteen Hours (1951)
  - Nevada Smith (1966)

Howard Hawks

- Dimitri Tiomkin
  - Only Angels Have Wings (1938)
  - Red River (1948)
  - The Big Sky (1952)
  - Land of the Pharaohs (1955)
  - Rio Bravo (1959)

Amy Heckerling

- David Kitay
  - Look Who's Talking (1989)
  - Look Who's Talking Too (1990)
  - Clueless (1995)
  - Loser (2000)
  - Vamps (2012)

Stephen Herek

- David Newman
  - Critters (1986)
  - Bill & Ted's Excellent Adventure (1989)
  - Don't Tell Mom the Babysitter's Dead (1991)
  - The Mighty Ducks (1992)
  - Life or Something Like It (2002)
  - Man of the House (2005)

Werner Herzog

- Popol Vuh
  - Aguirre, Wrath of God (1972)
  - The Great Ecstasy of Woodcarver Steiner (1974)
  - Heart of Glass (1976)
  - Nosferatu: Phantom der Nacht (1979)
  - Fitzcarraldo (1982)
  - Gasherbrum – Der leuchtende Berg (1984)
  - Cobra Verde (1987)
  - My Best Fiend (1999)
- Ernst Reijseger
  - The White Diamond (2004)
  - The Wild Blue Yonder (2005)
  - My Son, My Son, What Have Ye Done? (2009)
  - Cave of Forgotten Dreams (2010)
  - Salt and Fire (2016)
  - Nomad: In the Footsteps of Bruce Chatwin (2019)
  - Family Romance, LLC (2019)
  - Fireball: Visitors from Darker Worlds (2020)

Walter Hill

- Ry Cooder
  - The Long Riders (1980)
  - Southern Comfort (1981)
  - Streets of Fire (1984)
  - Brewster's Millions (1985)
  - Crossroads (1986)
  - Johnny Handsome (1989)
  - Trespass (1992)
  - Geronimo: An American Legend (1993)
  - Last Man Standing (1996)

Alfred Hitchcock

- Bernard Herrmann
  - The Trouble with Harry (1955)
  - The Wrong Man (1956)
  - The Man Who Knew Too Much (1956)
  - Vertigo (1958)
  - North by Northwest (1959)
  - Psycho (1960)
  - The Birds (1963)
  - Marnie (1964)

Michael Hoffman

- James Newton Howard
  - Promised Land (1987)
  - Some Girls (1988)
  - Restoration (1995)
  - One Fine Day (1996)
  - The Emperor's Club (2002)

Agnieszka Holland

- Jan A.P. Kaczmarek
  - Total Eclipse (1995)
  - Washington Square (1997)
  - The Third Miracle (1999)
  - Shot in the Heart (2001)
  - A Girl Like Me: The Gwen Araujo Story (2006)

Ishirō Honda

- Akira Ifukube
  - Godzilla (1954)
  - Rodan (1956)
  - Godzilla, King of the Monsters! (1956)
  - The Mysterians (1957)
  - Varan the Unbelievable (1958)
  - Battle in Outer Space (1959)
  - King Kong vs. Godzilla (1962)
  - Atragon (1963)
  - Mothra vs. Godzilla (1964)
  - Dogora (1964)
  - Ghidrah, the Three-Headed Monster (1964)
  - Invasion of Astro-Monster (1965)
  - Frankenstein Conquers the World (1965)
  - The War of the Gargantuas (1966)
  - King Kong Escapes (1967)
  - Destroy All Monsters (1968)
  - Latitude Zero (1969)
  - Space Amoeba (1970)
  - Terror of Mechagodzilla (1975)

Ron Howard

- James Horner
  - Cocoon (1985)
  - Willow (1988)
  - Apollo 13 (1995)
  - Ransom (1996)
  - How the Grinch Stole Christmas (2000)
  - A Beautiful Mind (2001)
  - The Missing (2003)
- Hans Zimmer
  - Backdraft (1991)
  - The Da Vinci Code (2006)
  - Frost/Nixon (2008)
  - Angels & Demons (2009)
  - Rush (2013)
  - Inferno (2016)
  - Hillbilly Elegy (2020)
  - Eden (2024)

Reginald Hudlin

- Marcus Miller
  - House Party (1990)
  - Boomerang (1992)
  - The Great White Hype (1996)
  - The Ladies Man (2000)
  - Serving Sara (2002)
  - Marshall (2017)
  - Safety (2020)
  - Sidney (2022)
  - Candy Cane Lane (2023)

John Hughes

- Ira Newborn
  - Sixteen Candles (1984)
  - Weird Science (1985)
  - Ferris Bueller's Day Off (1986)
  - Planes, Trains and Automobiles (1987)
  - Uncle Buck (1989)

John Huston

- Alex North
  - The Misfits (1961)
  - Wise Blood (1979)
  - Under the Volcano (1984)
  - Prizzi's Honor (1985)
  - The Dead (1987)

Nicholas Hytner

- George Fenton
  - The Madness of King George (1994)
  - The Crucible (1996)
  - The Object of My Affection (1998)
  - Center Stage (2000)
  - The History Boys (2006)
  - The Lady in the Van (2015)

== I ==
Otar Iosseliani

- Nicolas Zourabichvili
  - Favorites of the Moon (1984)
  - And Then There Was Light (1989)
  - Brigands-Chapter VII (1996)
  - Farewell, Home Sweet Home (1999)
  - Monday Morning (2002)
  - Gardens in Autumn (2006)

James Ivory

- Richard Robbins
  - The Europeans (1979)
  - Jane Austen in Manhattan (1980)
  - Quartet (1981)
  - Heat and Dust (1983)
  - The Bostonians (1984)
  - A Room With a View (1985)
  - Maurice (1987)
  - Slaves of New York (1989)
  - Mr. & Mrs. Bridge (1990)
  - Howards End (1992)
  - The Remains of the Day (1993)
  - Jefferson in Paris (1995)
  - Surviving Picasso (1996)
  - A Soldier's Daughter Never Cries (1998)
  - The Golden Bowl (2000)
  - Le Divorce (2003)
  - The White Countess (2005)

== J ==
Peter Jackson

- Howard Shore
  - The Lord of the Rings: The Fellowship of the Ring (2001)
  - The Lord of the Rings: The Two Towers (2002)
  - The Lord of the Rings: The Return of the King (2003)
  - The Hobbit: An Unexpected Journey (2012)
  - The Hobbit: The Desolation of Smaug (2013)
  - The Hobbit: The Battle of the Five Armies (2014)

Jerry Jameson

- Bruce Broughton
  - This Girl for Hire (1983)
  - The Cowboy and the Ballerina (1984)
  - Stormin' Home (1985)
  - Last Flight Out (2004)
  - Safe Harbor (2009)

Rian Johnson

- Nathan Johnson
  - Brick (2005)
  - The Brothers Bloom (2008)
  - Looper (2012)
  - Knives Out (2019)
  - Glass Onion: A Knives Out Mystery (2022)
  - Wake Up Dead Man (2025)

Glenn Jordan

- David Shire
  - Only When I Laugh (1981)
  - Promise (1986)
  - Echoes in the Darkness (1987)
  - Sarah, Plain and Tall (1991)
  - The Boys (1991)
  - Jane's House (1994)
  - Sarah, Plain and Tall: Winter's End (1999)

Neil Jordan

- Elliot Goldenthal
  - Interview with the Vampire (1994)
  - Michael Collins (1996)
  - The Butcher Boy (1997)
  - In Dreams (1999)
  - The Good Thief (2002)

== K ==
Shusuke Kaneko

- Kow Otani
  - My Soul Is Slashed (1991)
  - No Worries on the Recruit Front (1991)
  - Graduation Journey: I Came from Japan (1993)
  - It's a Summer Vacation Everyday (1994)
  - Gamera: Guardian of the Universe (1995)
  - Gamera 2: Attack of Legion (1996)
  - Haunted School 3 (1997)
  - Gamera 3: The Revenge of Iris (1999)
  - Pyrokinesis (2000)
  - Godzilla, Mothra and King Ghidorah: Giant Monsters All-Out Attack (2001)

Phil Karlson

- George Duning
  - Lorna Doone (1951)
  - Scandal Sheet (1952)
  - Tight Spot (1955)
  - 5 Against the House (1955)
  - The Brothers Rico (1957)
  - Gunman's Walk (1958)

Jake Kasdan

- Michael Andrews
  - Orange County (2002)
  - The TV Set (2006)
  - Walk Hard: The Dewey Cox Story (2007)
  - Bad Teacher (2011)
  - Sex Tape (2014)

Lawrence Kasdan

- James Newton Howard
  - Grand Canyon (1991)
  - Wyatt Earp (1994)
  - French Kiss (1995)
  - Mumford (1999)
  - Dreamcatcher (2003)
  - Darling Companion (2012)

Krzysztof Kieślowski

- Zbigniew Preisner
  - No End (1984)
  - A Short Film About Killing (1988)
  - The Decalogue (1988)
  - The Double Life of Véronique (1991)
  - Three Colors: Blue (1993)
  - Three Colors: White (1993)
  - Three Colors: Red (1993)

Henry King

- Alfred Newman
  - Ramona (1936)
  - Alexander's Ragtime Band (1938)
  - Little Old New York (1940)
  - A Yank in the RAF (1941)
  - Remember the Day (1941)
  - The Black Swan (1942)
  - The Song of Bernadette (1943)
  - Wilson (1944)
  - A Bell for Adano (1945)
  - Margie (1946)
  - Captain from Castile (1947)
  - Prince of Foxes (1949)
  - Twelve O'Clock High (1949)
  - The Gunfighter (1950)
  - David and Bathsheba (1951)
  - Wait till the Sun Shines, Nellie (1952)
  - Love Is a Many-Splendored Thing (1955)
  - Carousel (1956)
  - The Bravados (1958)

Takeshi Kitano

- Joe Hisaishi
  - A Scene at the Sea (1991)
  - Sonatine (1993)
  - Getting Any? (1995)
  - Kids Return (1996)
  - Hana-bi (1997)
  - Kikujiro (1999)
  - Brother (2000)
  - Dolls (2002)
- Keiichi Suzuki
  - Zatōichi (2003)
  - Outrage (2010)
  - Beyond Outrage (2012)
  - Ryuzo and the Seven Henchmen (2015)
  - Outrage Coda (2017)

Travis Knight

- Dario Marianelli
  - The Boxtrolls (2014)
  - Kubo and the Two Strings (2016)
  - Bumblebee (2018)
  - Wildwood (2026)
  - Masters of the Universe (2026)

Masaki Kobayashi

- Toru Takemitsu
  - The Inheritance (1962)
  - Harakiri (1962)
  - Kwaidan (1964)
  - Samurai Rebellion (1967)
  - Hymn to a Tired Man (1968)
  - Inn of Evil (1971)
  - The Fossil (1975)
  - Glowing Autumn (1979)
  - Tokyo Trial (1983)
  - The Empty Table (1985)

Andrei Konchalovsky

- Eduard Artemyev
  - Siberiade (1979)
  - Homer and Eddie (1989)
  - The Inner Circle (1991)
  - House of Fools (2002)
  - Gloss (2007)
  - The Nutcracker in 3D (2010)
  - The Postman's White Nights (2014)
  - Sin (2019)

Zoltan Korda

- Miklós Rózsa
  - The Four Feathers (1939)
  - The Jungle Book (1942)
  - Sahara (1943)
  - The Macomber Affair (1947)
  - A Woman's Vengeance (1948)

Stanley Kramer

- Ernest Gold
  - The Defiant Ones (1958)
  - On the Beach (1959)
  - Inherit the Wind (1960)
  - Judgment at Nuremberg (1961)
  - It's a Mad, Mad, Mad, Mad World (1963)
  - Ship of Fools (1965)
  - The Secret of Santa Vittoria (1969)
  - The Runner Stumbles (1979)

Roger Kumble

- Edward Shearmur
  - Cruel Intentions (1999)
  - The Sweetest Thing (2002)
  - College Road Trip (2008)
  - Furry Vengeance (2010)
  - Falling Inn Love (2019)

Akira Kurosawa

- Fumio Hayasaka
  - Drunken Angel (1948)
  - Stray Dog (1949)
  - Scandal (1950)
  - Rashomon (1950)
  - The Idiot (1951)
  - Ikiru (1952)
  - Seven Samurai (1954)
- Masaru Sato
  - Throne of Blood (1957)
  - The Lower Depths (1957)
  - The Hidden Fortress (1958)
  - The Bad Sleep Well (1960)
  - Yojimbo (1961)
  - Sanjuro (1962)
  - High and Low (1963)
  - Red Beard (1965)

Ken Kwapis

- Cliff Eidelman
  - The Beautician and the Beast (1997)
  - Sexual Life (2005)
  - The Sisterhood of the Travelling Pants (2005)
  - He's Just Not That Into You (2009)
  - Big Miracle (2012)

== L ==
Aldo Lado

- Ennio Morricone
  - La corta notte delle bambole di vetro (1971) – English: "Short Night of Glass Dolls"
  - Who Saw Her Die? (1972)
  - La cosa buffa (1972)
  - L'ultimo treno della notte (1975) – English: "Last Stop on the Night Train"
  - L'umanoid (1979) – English: "The Humanoid"
  - La disubbidienza (1981) – English: "Disobedience"

John Landis

- Elmer Bernstein
  - Animal House (1978)
  - An American Werewolf in London (1981)
  - Trading Places (1983)
  - Thriller (1983)
  - Spies Like Us (1985)
  - Three Amigos (1986)
  - Oscar (1991)

Walter Lang

- Cyril J. Mockridge
  - Second Honeymoon (1937)
  - I'll Give a Million (1938)
  - The Little Princess (1939)
  - The Great Profile (1940)
  - The Magnificent Dope (1942)
  - Claudia and David (1946)
  - Sentimental Journey (1946)
  - Cheaper by the Dozen (1950)
  - Desk Set (1957)
- Alfred Newman
  - The Blue Bird (1940)
  - Tin Pan Alley (1940)
  - Song of the Islands (1942)
  - Sitting Pretty (1948)
  - When My Baby Smiles at Me (1948)
  - You're My Everything (1949)
  - On the Riviera (1951)
  - With a Song in My Heart (1952)
  - Call Me Madam (1953)

Francis Lawrence

- James Newton Howard
  - I Am Legend (2007)
  - Water for Elephants (2011)
  - The Hunger Games: Catching Fire (2013)
  - The Hunger Games: Mockingjay – Part 1 (2014)
  - The Hunger Games: Mockingjay – Part 2 (2015)
  - Red Sparrow (2018)
  - The Hunger Games: The Ballad of Songbirds & Snakes (2023)
  - The Hunger Games: Sunrise on the Reaping (2026)

Malcolm D. Lee

- Stanley Clarke
  - The Best Man (1999)
  - Undercover Brother (2002)
  - Roll Bounce (2005)
  - Soul Men (2008)
  - The Best Man Holiday (2013)
  - Barbershop: The Next Cut (2016)

Spike Lee

- Terence Blanchard
  - Jungle Fever (1991)
  - Malcolm X (1992)
  - Crooklyn (1994)
  - Clockers (1995)
  - Get on the Bus (1996)
  - Summer of Sam (1999)
  - Bamboozled (2000)
  - 25th Hour (2002)
  - She Hate Me (2004)
  - Sucker Free City (2004)
  - Inside Man (2006)
  - Miracle at St. Anna (2008)
  - Da Sweet Blood of Jesus (2014)
  - Chi-Raq (2015)
  - BlacKkKlansman (2018)
  - Da 5 Bloods (2020)
- Bill Lee
  - Joe's Bed-Stuy Barbershop: We Cut Hair (1983)
  - She's Gotta Have It (1986)
  - School Daze (1988)
  - Do the Right Thing (1989)
  - Mo' Better Blues (1990)

Kasi Lemmons

- Terence Blanchard
  - Eve's Bayou (1997)
  - The Caveman's Valentine (2001)
  - Talk to Me (2007)
  - Harriet (2019)
  - Whitney Houston: I Wanna Dance with Somebody (2022)

Robert Z. Leonard

- Herbert Stothart
  - In Gay Madrid (1930)
  - Peg o' My Heart (1933)
  - Naughty Marietta (1935)
  - Maytime (1937)
  - The Girl of the Golden West (1938)
  - Broadway Serenade (1939)
  - Pride and Prejudice (1940)
  - New Moon (1940)
  - Ziegfeld Girl (1941)

Sergio Leone

- Ennio Morricone
  - A Fistful of Dollars (1964)
  - For a Few Dollars More (1965)
  - The Good, the Bad and the Ugly (1966)
  - Once Upon a Time in the West (1968)
  - Duck, You Sucker! (1971)
  - Once Upon a Time in America (1984)

Mervyn LeRoy

- Herbert Stothart
  - Waterloo Bridge (1940)
  - Blossoms in the Dust (1941)
  - Random Harvest (1942)
  - Madame Curie (1943)
  - Thirty Seconds Over Tokyo (1944)

Umberto Lenzi

- Franco Micalizzi
  - Syndicate Sadists (1975)
  - The Tough Ones (1976)
  - Violent Naples (1976)
  - The Cynic, the Rat and the Fist (1977)
  - The Biggest Battle (1978)
  - La banda del gobbo (1978)
  - From Corleone to Brooklyn (1979)
  - Scusi, lei è normale? (1979)
  - Black Demons (1991)
  - Mean Tricks (1992)

Richard Lester

- Ken Thorne
  - A Funny Thing Happened on the Way to the Forum (1966)
  - How I Won the War (1967)
  - The Bed Sitting Room (1969)
  - Juggernaut (1974)
  - The Ritz (1976)
  - Superman II (1980)
  - Superman III (1983)
  - Finders Keepers (1984)

Brian Levant

- David Newman
  - The Flintstones (1994)
  - Jingle All the Way (1996)
  - The Flintstones in Viva Rock Vegas (2000)
  - Are We There Yet? (2005)
  - Scooby-Doo! The Mystery Begins (2009)
  - The Spy Next Door (2010)
  - Scooby-Doo! Curse of the Lake Monster (2010)
  - A Christmas Story 2 (2012)

Henry Levin

- George Duning
  - The Guilt of Janet Ames (1947)
  - The Corpse Came C.O.D. (1947)
  - The Gallant Blade (1948)
  - The Man from Colorado (1948)
  - Jolson Sings Again (1949)
  - And Baby Makes Three (1949)
  - Convicted (1950)
  - The Petty Girl (1950)
  - The Flying Missile (1950)
  - Two of a Kind (1951)
  - The Family Secret (1951)

Barry Levinson

- Marcelo Zarvos
  - What Just Happened (2008)
  - You Don't Know Jack (2010)
  - The Bay (2012)
  - The Humbling (2014)
  - Rock the Kasbah (2015)

Shawn Levy

- Christophe Beck
  - Big Fat Liar (2002)
  - Just Married (2003)
  - Cheaper by the Dozen (2003)
  - The Pink Panther (2006)
  - Date Night (2010)
  - Little Brother (2012)
  - The Internship (2013)
  - Free Guy (2021)

Jerry Lewis

- Walter Scharf
  - The Jerry Lewis Show (1958)
  - The Bellboy (1960)
  - The Ladies Man (1961)
  - The Errand Boy (1961)
  - The Nutty Professor (1963)

Herschell Gordon Lewis

- Larry Wellington
  - Two Thousand Maniacs! (1964)
  - Jimmy, the Boy Wonder (1966)
  - The Gruesome Twosome (1967)
  - Blast-Off Girls (1967)
  - Just for the Hell of It (1968)
  - The Wizard of Gore (1970)

Doug Liman

- John Powell
  - The Bourne Identity (2002)
  - Mr. & Mrs. Smith (2005)
  - Jumper (2008)
  - Fair Game (2010)
  - Locked Down (2021)

Justin Lin

- Brian Tyler
  - Annapolis (2006)
  - The Fast and the Furious: Tokyo Drift (2006)
  - Finishing the Game (2007)
  - Fast & Furious (2009)
  - Fast Five (2011)
  - F9 (2021)

Richard Linklater

- Graham Reynolds
  - A Scanner Darkly (2006)
  - Bernie (2011)
  - Up to Speed (2012)
  - Before Midnight (2013)
  - Last Flag Flying (2017)
  - Where'd You Go, Bernadette (2018)
  - Blue Moon (2025)

Sam Liu

- Frederik Wiedmann
  - Justice League: Gods and Monsters (2015)
  - Justice League vs. Teen Titans (2016)
  - Teen Titans: The Judas Contract (2017)
  - Batman: Gotham by Gaslight (2018)
  - Superman: Red Son (2020)

Ken Loach

- George Fenton
  - Ladybird Ladybird (1994)
  - Land and Freedom (1995)
  - Carla's Song (1996)
  - My Name is Joe (1998)
  - Bread and Roses (2000)
  - The Navigators (2001)
  - Sweet Sixteen (2002)
  - Ae Fond Kiss... (2004)
  - Tickets (2005)
  - The Wind That Shakes the Barley (2006)
  - It's a Free World... (2007)
  - Looking for Eric (2009)
  - Route Irish (2010)
  - The Angels' Share (2012)
  - Jimmy's Hall (2014)
  - I, Daniel Blake (2016)
  - Sorry We Missed You (2019)

David Lowery

- Daniel Hart
  - Ain't Them Bodies Saints (2013)
  - Pete's Dragon (2016)
  - A Ghost Story (2017)
  - The Old Man and the Gun (2018)
  - Green Knight (2021)
  - Peter Pan & Wendy (2023)

Sidney Lumet

- Quincy Jones
  - The Pawnbroker (1964)
  - The Deadly Affair (1967)
  - Last of the Mobile Hot Shots (1970)
  - The Anderson Tapes (1971)
  - The Wiz (1978)

Rod Lurie

- Larry Groupe
  - Deterrence (1999)
  - The Contender (2000)
  - Resurrecting the Champ (2007)
  - Nothing But the Truth (2008)
  - Straw Dogs (2011)
  - The Outpost (2019)

William Lustig

- Jay Chattaway
  - Maniac (1980)
  - Vigilante (1983)
  - Maniac Cop (1988)
  - Relentless (1989)
  - Maniac Cop 2 (1990)

David Lynch

- Angelo Badalamenti
  - Blue Velvet (1986)
  - Wild at Heart (1990)
  - Lost Highway (1997)
  - The Straight Story (1999)
  - Mulholland Drive (2001)

== M ==
John Madden

- Stephen Warbeck
  - Prime Suspect (1995)
  - Mrs. Brown (1997)
  - Shakespeare in Love (1998)
  - Captain Corelli's Mandolin (2001)
  - Proof (2005)

Joseph L. Mankiewicz

- Alfred Newman
  - Dragonwyck (1946)
  - A Letter to Three Wives (1949)
  - No Way Out (1950)
  - All About Eve (1950)
  - People Will Talk (1951)

Daniel Mann

- Alex North
  - The Rose Tattoo (1955)
  - I'll Cry Tomorrow (1955)
  - Hot Spell (1958)
  - A Dream of Kings (1969)
  - Willard (1971)
  - Journey into Fear (1975)

Delbert Mann

- Allyn Ferguson
  - All Quiet on the Western Front (1979)
  - The Last Days of Patton (1986)
  - April Morning (1988)
  - Ironclads (1991)
  - Against Her Will: An Incident in Baltimore (1992)

Garry Marshall

- John Debney
  - The Princess Diaries (2001)
  - Raising Helen (2004)
  - The Princess Diaries 2: Royal Engagement (2004)
  - Georgia Rule (2007)
  - Valentine's Day (2010)
  - New Year's Eve (2011)
  - Mother's Day (2016)

George Marshall

- Victor Young
  - The Forest Rangers (1942)
  - True to Life (1943)
  - Riding High (1943)
  - And the Angels Sing (1944)
  - The Blue Dahlia (1946)
  - A Millionaire for Christy (1951)

Armand Mastroianni

- Harry Manfredini
  - Cameron's Closet (1988)
  - Double Revenge (1988)
  - Cries Unheard: The Donna Yaklich Story (1994)
  - Mrs. Washington Goes to Smith (2009)
  - Dark Desire (2012)
- Louis Febre
  - First Daughter (1999)
  - Final Run (1999)
  - Nowhere to Land (2000)
  - First Target (2000)
  - Hidden Target (2002)

Paul Mazursky

- Bill Conti
  - Blume in Love (1973)
  - Harry and Tonto (1974)
  - Next Stop, Greenwich Village (1976)
  - An Unmarried Woman (1978)
  - Winchell (1998)
  - Coast to Coast (2003)

Martin McDonagh

- Carter Burwell
  - In Bruges (2008)
  - Seven Psychopaths (2012)
  - Three Billboards Outside Ebbing, Missouri (2017)
  - The Banshees of Inisherin (2022)
  - Wild Horse Nine (2026)

Vincent McEveety

- Buddy Baker
  - Walt Disney's Wonderful World of Color (1970)
  - The Million Dollar Duck (1971)
  - Charley and the Angel (1973)
  - Superdad (1973)
  - Treasure of Matecumbe (1976)
  - The Apple Dumpling Gang Rides Again (1979)
- Robert F. Brunner
  - The Biscuit Eater (1972)
  - The Castaway Cowboy (1974)
  - The Strongest Man in the World (1975)
  - Gus (1976)
  - Amy (1981)

Andrew V. McLaglen

- Henryk Wars
  - Gun the Man Down (1956)
  - Man in the Vault (1956)
  - Freckles (1960)
  - The Little Shepherd of Kingdom Come (1961)
  - Fools' Parade (1971)

Sam Mendes

- Thomas Newman
  - American Beauty (1999)
  - Road to Perdition (2002)
  - Jarhead (2005)
  - Revolutionary Road (2008)
  - Skyfall (2012)
  - Spectre (2015)
  - 1917 (2019)

Jiří Menzel

- Jiří Šust
  - Closely Watched Trains (1966)
  - Capricious Summer (1968)
  - Larks on a String (1969)
  - Seclusion Near a Forest (1976)
  - Those Wonderful Movie Cranks (1979)
  - Cutting It Short (1981)
  - The Snowdrop Festival (1984)
  - My Sweet Little Village (1985)
  - Life and Extraordinary Adventures of Private Ivan Chonkin (1994)

Kieth Merrill

- Merrill Jenson
  - Three Warriors (1977)
  - Take Down (1979)
  - Windwalker (1980)
  - Harry's Wife (1981)
  - Alamo: The Price of Freedom (1988)

Nikita Mikhalkov

- Eduard Artemyev
  - At Home Among Strangers (1974)
  - An Unfinished Piece for Mechanical Piano (1977)
  - A Few Days from the Life of I. I. Oblomov (1980)
  - Anna: 6–18' (1980-1993)
  - Burnt by the Sun (1994)
  - The Barber of Siberia (1998)
  - Sunstroke (2014)

Takashi Miike

- Kōji Endō
  - Rainy Dog (1997)
  - Full Metal Yakuza (1997)
  - The Bird People in China (1998)
  - Young Thugs: Nostalgia (1998)
  - Ley Lines (1999)
  - Audition (1999)
  - Dead or Alive (1999)
  - Man, Next Natural Girl: 100 Nights in Yokohama (1999)
  - The City of Lost Souls (2000)
  - Visitor Q (2001)
  - Agitator (2001)
  - The Happiness of the Katakuris (2001)
  - Dead or Alive: Final (2002)
  - Sabu (2002)
  - Graveyard of Honor (2002)
  - The Man in White (2003)
  - Gozu (2003)
  - One Missed Call (2003)
  - Zebraman (2004)
  - Three... Extremes (2004)
  - Izo (2004)
  - Demon Pond (2005)
  - The Great Yokai War (2005)
  - Imprint (2006)
  - Big Bang Love, Juvenile A (2006)
  - Sun Scarred (2006)
  - Sukiyaki Western Django (2007)
  - Like a Dragon (2007)
  - Detective Story (2007)
  - 13 Assassins (2010)
  - Ace Attorney (2012)
  - Lesson of the Evil (2012)
  - Shield of Straw (2013)
  - The Mole Song: Undercover Agent Reiji (2013)
  - Over Your Dead Body (2014)
  - As the Gods Will (2014)
  - The Lion Standing in the Wind (2015)
  - Yakuza Apocalypse (2015)
  - Terra Formars (2016)
  - The Mole Song: Hong Kong Capriccio (2016)
  - Blade of the Immortal (2017)
  - JoJo's Bizarre Adventure: Diamond Is Unbreakable Chapter I (2017)
  - Laplace's Witch (2018)
  - First Love (2019)

John Milius

- Basil Poledouris
  - Big Wednesday (1978)
  - Conan the Barbarian (1982)
  - Red Dawn (1984)
  - Farewell to the King (1989)
  - Flight of the Intruder (1991)

George T. Miller

- Bruce Rowland
  - The Man from Snowy River (1982)
  - Cool Change (1986)
  - Bushfire Moon (1987)
  - Gross Misconduct (1993)
  - Andre (1994)
  - Zeus and Roxanne (1997)

Vincente Minnelli

- André Previn
  - Kismet (1955)
  - Designing Woman (1957)
  - Gigi (1958)
  - Bells Are Ringing (1960)
  - The Four Horsemen of the Apocalypse (1962)
  - Goodbye Charlie (1964)

Hayao Miyazaki

- Joe Hisaishi
  - Nausicaä of the Valley of the Wind (1984)
  - Castle in the Sky (1986)
  - My Neighbor Totoro (1988)
  - Kiki's Delivery Service (1989)
  - Porco Rosso (1992)
  - Princess Mononoke (1997)
  - Spirited Away (2001)
  - Howl's Moving Castle (2004)
  - Ponyo (2008)
  - The Wind Rises (2013)
  - The Boy and the Heron (2023)

Kenji Mizoguchi

- Fumio Hayasaka
  - Portrait of Madame Yuki (1950)
  - Miss Oyu (1951)
  - The Lady of Musashino (1951)
  - Ugetsu (1953)
  - The Crucified Lovers (1954)
  - Sansho the Bailiff (1954)
  - Princess Yang Kwei-Fei (1955)
  - Tales of the Taira Clan (1955)

Giuliano Montaldo

- Ennio Morricone
  - Ad ogni costo (1967)
  - Gli intoccabili (1969)
  - Sacco and Vanzetti (1971)
  - Giordano Bruno (1973)
  - L'Agnese va a morire (1976)
  - Il giocattolo (1979)
  - Il giorno prima (1987)
  - Gli occhiali d'oro (1987)
  - Tempo di uccidere (1991)
  - I Demoni di San Pietroburgo (2008)

Robert Mulligan

- Elmer Bernstein
  - Fear Strikes Out (1957)
  - The Rat Race (1960)
  - To Kill a Mockingbird (1962)
  - Love with the Proper Stranger (1963)
  - Baby the Rain Must Fall (1965)
  - Bloodbrothers (1978)

== N ==
Mike Newell

- Richard Hartley
  - Bad Blood (1982)
  - Dance with a Stranger (1985)
  - The Good Father (1985)
  - Soursweet (1988)
  - An Awfully Big Adventure (1995)
  - Great Expectations (2012)

Jeff Nichols

- David Wingo
  - Take Shelter (2011)
  - Mud (2012)
  - Midnight Special (2016)
  - Loving (2016)
  - The Bikeriders (2023)

== O ==
Mamoru Oshii

- Kenji Kawai
  - Twilight Q (1987)
  - The Red Spectacles (1987)
  - Patlabor (1988)
  - Patlabor: The Movie (1989)
  - StrayDog: Kerberos Panzer Cops (1991)
  - Talking Head (1992)
  - Patlabor 2: The Movie (1993)
  - Ghost in the Shell (1995)
  - Avalon (2001)
  - Ghost in the Shell 2: Innocence (2004)
  - The Sky Crawlers (2008)
  - Assault Girls (2009)
  - The Last Druid: Garm Wars (2015)

Keishi Ōtomo

- Naoki Satō
  - Rurouni Kenshin (2012)
  - Rurouni Kenshin: Kyoto Inferno (2014)
  - Rurouni Kenshin: The Legend Ends (2014)
  - The Top Secret: Murder in Mind (2016)
  - Rurouni Kenshin: The Final (2021)
  - Rurouni Kenshin: The Beginning (2021)

Yasujirō Ozu

- Senji Itō
  - The Only Son (1936)
  - What Did the Lady Forget? (1937)
  - Brothers and Sisters of the Toda Family (1941)
  - A Hen in the Wind (1948)
  - Late Spring (1949)
  - Early Summer (1951)
- Takanobu Saitô
  - Tokyo Story (1953)
  - Early Spring (1956)
  - Tokyo Twilight (1957)
  - Equinox Flower (1958)
  - Floating Weeds (1959)
  - Late Autumn (1960)
  - An Autumn Afternoon (1962)

== P ==
Alan J. Pakula

- Michael Small
  - Klute (1971)
  - Love and Pain and the Whole Damn Thing (1973)
  - The Parallax View (1974)
  - Comes A Horseman (1978)
  - Rollover (1981)
  - Dream Lover (1986)
  - Orphans (1987)
  - See You in The Morning (1989)
  - Consenting Adults (1992)

Nick Park

- Julian Nott
  - A Grand Day Out (1989)
  - The Wrong Trousers (1993)
  - A Close Shave (1995)
  - Wallace & Gromit: The Curse of the Were-Rabbit (2005)
  - A Matter of Loaf and Death (2008)

Oliver Parker

- Charlie Mole
  - Othello (1995)
  - An Ideal Husband (1999)
  - The Importance of Being Earnest (2002)
  - I Really Hate My Job (2007)
  - St Trinian's (2007)
  - Dorian Gray (2009)
  - St Trinian's 2: The Legend of Fritton's Gold (2009)
  - Dad's Army (2016)
  - Swimming with Men (2018)

Pier Paolo Pasolini

- Ennio Morricone
  - Uccellacci e uccellini (1966)
  - Teorema (1968)
  - Il Decameron (1971)
  - I racconti di Canterbury (1972)
  - Il fiore delle Mille e una Notte (1974)
  - Salò o le 120 giornate di Sodoma (1975)

Alexander Payne

- Rolfe Kent
  - Citizen Ruth (1996)
  - Election (1999)
  - About Schmidt (2002)
  - Sideways (2004)
  - Downsizing (2017)

Sam Peckinpah

- Jerry Fielding
  - Noon Wine (1966)
  - The Wild Bunch (1969)
  - Straw Dogs (1971)
  - Junior Bonner (1972)
  - Bring Me the Head of Alfredo Garcia (1974)
  - The Killer Elite (1975)

Larry Peerce

- Charles Fox
  - The Incident (1967)
  - Goodbye, Columbus (1969)
  - A Separate Peace (1972)
  - The Other Side of the Mountain (1975)
  - Two-Minute Warning (1976)
  - Why Would I Lie? (1980)
  - Love Child (1982)

Tyler Perry

- Aaron Zigman
  - Why Did I Get Married? (2007)
  - Meet the Browns (2008)
  - The Family That Preys (2008)
  - Madea Goes to Jail (2009)
  - I Can Do Bad All by Myself (2009)
  - Why Did I Get Married Too? (2010)
  - For Colored Girls (2010)
  - Madea's Big Happy Family (2011)
  - Good Deeds (2012)
  - Madea's Witness Protection (2012)
  - Temptation: Confessions of a Marriage Counselor (2013)
  - Peeples (2013)
  - A Jazzman's Blues (2022)
  - Six Triple Eight (2024)

Wolfgang Petersen

- Klaus Doldinger
  - Einer von uns beiden (1974)
  - Die Konsequenz (1977)
  - Planübung (1977)
  - Black and White Like Day and Night (1978)
  - Das Boot (1981)

Elio Petri

- Ennio Morricone
  - A Quiet Place in the Country (1968)
  - Investigation of a Citizen Above Suspicion (1970)
  - The Working Class Goes to Heaven (1971)
  - Property Is No Longer a Theft (1973)
  - Todo modo (1976)
  - Good News (1979)

Todd Phillips

- Christophe Beck
  - School for Scoundrels (2006)
  - The Hangover (2009)
  - Due Date (2010)
  - The Hangover Part II (2011)
  - The Hangover Part III (2013)

Charles B. Pierce

- Jaime Mendoza-Nava
  - The Legend of Boggy Creek (1972)
  - Bootleggers (1974)
  - The Winds of Autumn (1976)
  - The Town That Dreaded Sundown (1976)
  - Grayeagle (1977)
  - The Norseman (1978)
  - The Evictors (1979)

Roman Polanski

- Alexandre Desplat
  - The Ghost Writer (2010)
  - Carnage (2011)
  - Venus in Fur (2013)
  - Based on a True Story (2017)
  - An Officer and a Spy (2019)
  - The Palace (2023)
- Krzysztof Komeda
  - Two Men and a Wardrobe (1958)
  - When Angels Fall (1959)
  - The Fat and the Lean (1961)
  - Mammals (1961)
  - Knife in the Water (1962)
  - Cul-de-sac (1966)
  - The Fearless Vampire Killers (1967)
  - Rosemary's Baby (1968)

Sydney Pollack

- Dave Grusin
  - The Yakuza (1974)
  - Three Days of the Condor (1975)
  - Bobby Deerfield (1977)
  - The Electric Horseman (1979)
  - Absence of Malice (1981)
  - Tootsie (1982)
  - Havana (1990)
  - The Firm (1993)
  - Random Hearts (1999)

Albert Pyun

- Anthony Riparetti
  - Alien from L.A. (1988)
  - Kickboxer 2: The Road Back (1991)
  - Bloodmatch (1991)
  - Dollman (1991)
  - Brainsmasher... A Love Story (1993)
  - Knights (1993)
  - Kickboxer 4: The Aggressor (1994)
  - Spitfire (1995)
  - Nemesis 2: Nebula (1995)
  - Adrenalin: Fear the Rush (1996)
  - Nemesis 3: Time Lapse (1996)
  - Omega Doom (1996)
  - Nemesis 4: Death Angel (1996)
  - Mean Guns (1997)
  - Crazy Six (1997)
  - Postmortem (1998)
  - Urban Menace (1999)
  - Corrupt (1999)
  - The Wrecking Crew (2000)
  - Invasion (2005)
  - Left for Dead (2007)
  - Road to Hell (2008)
  - Bulletface (2010)
  - Tales of an Ancient Empire (2010)

== R ==
Sam Raimi

- Danny Elfman
  - Darkman (1990)
  - A Simple Plan (1998)
  - Spider-Man (2002)
  - Spider-Man 2 (2004)
  - Oz: The Great and Powerful (2013)
  - Doctor Strange in the Multiverse of Madness (2022)
  - Send Help (2026)

S. S. Rajamouli

- M. M. Keeravani
  - Student No. 1 (2001)
  - Simhadri (2003)
  - Challenge (2004)
  - Chatrapathi (2005)
  - Vikramarkudu (2006)
  - Thief of Yama (2007)
  - Magadheera (2009)
  - Maryada Ramanna (2010)
  - Eega (2012)
  - Baahubali: The Beginning (2015)
  - Baahubali 2: The Conclusion (2017)
  - RRR (2022)

Mani Ratnam

- A. R. Rahman
  - Roja (1992)
  - Thiruda Thiruda (1993)
  - Bombay (1995)
  - Iruvar (1997)
  - Dil Se.. (1998)
  - Alai Payuthey (2000)
  - Kannathil Muthamittal (2002)
  - Aayutha Ezhuthu (2004)
  - Yuva (2004)
  - Guru (2007)
  - Raavan (2010)
  - Raavanan (2010)
  - Kadal (2013)
  - O Kadhal Kanmani (2015)
  - Kaatru Veliyidai (2017)

Brett Ratner

- Lalo Schifrin
  - Money Talks (1997)
  - Rush Hour (1998)
  - Rush Hour 2 (2001)
  - After the Sunset (2004)
  - Rush Hour 3 (2007)

Fred Olen Ray

- Chuck Cirino
  - Alienator (1990)
  - Mob Boss (1990)
  - Inner Sanctum (1991)
  - Evil Toons (1992)
  - Possessed by the Night (1994)
  - Inner Sanctum II (1994)
  - Witch Academy (1995)
  - Mystery on Makeout Mountain (1997)
  - Little Miss Magic (1998)
  - Mom, Can I Keep Her (1998)
  - The Lair (2007–2009)
  - Dire Wolf (2009)
  - Megaconda (2010)
  - Lady Chatterly's Ghost (2011)
  - Carmel Spiders (2011)
- Jeffery Walton
  - Bikini Drive-In (1995)
  - Attack of the 60 Foot Centerfold (1995)
  - Invisible Mom (1996)
  - Inferno (1997)
  - Hybrid (1997)
  - Invisible Dad (1998)
  - Solar Flare (2008)
  - Super Shark (2011)
  - A Mother's Revenge (2016)
  - Unwanted Guest (2016)
  - The Twin (2017)
  - Deadly Shores (2018)

Matt Reeves

- Michael Giacchino
  - Cloverfield (2008)
  - Let Me In (2010)
  - Dawn of the Planet of the Apes (2014)
  - War for the Planet of the Apes (2017)
  - The Batman (2022)

Nicolas Winding Refn

- Peter Peter
  - Pusher (1996)
  - Bleeder (1999)
  - Pusher II (2004)
  - Pusher 3 (2005)
  - Valhalla Rising (2009)

Godfrey Reggio

- Philip Glass
  - Koyaanisqatsi (1982)
  - Powaqqatsi (1988)
  - Anima Mundi (1992)
  - Naqoyqatsi (2002)
  - Visitors (2013)

Carl Reiner

- Jack Elliott
  - The Comic (1969)
  - Where's Poppa? (1970)
  - The New Dick Van Dyke Show (1971 to 1974)
  - Oh God! (1977)
  - The Jerk (1979)
  - Sibling Rivalry (1990)

Rob Reiner

- Marc Shaiman
  - When Harry Met Sally... (1989)
  - Misery (1990)
  - A Few Good Men (1992)
  - North (1994)
  - The American President (1995)
  - Ghosts of Mississippi (1996)
  - The Story of Us (1999)
  - Alex & Emma (2003)
  - Rumor Has It (2005)
  - The Bucket List (2007)
  - Flipped (2010)
  - The Magic of Belle Isle (2012)
  - And So It Goes (2014)
  - LBJ (2016)
  - Albert Brooks: Defending My Life (2023)

Wolfgang Reitherman

- George Bruns
  - Goliath II (1960)
  - 101 Dalmatians (1961)
  - The Sword in the Stone (1963)
  - The Jungle Book (1967)
  - The Aristocats (1970)
  - Robin Hood (1973)

Jean Renoir

- Joseph Kosma
  - The Crime of Monsieur Lange (1936)
  - Partie de campagne (1936)
  - La Grande Illusion (1937)
  - La Marseillaise (1938)
  - La Bête Humaine (1938)
  - The Rules of the Game (1939) .
  - Elena and Her Men (1956)
  - Experiment in Evil (1959)
  - Picnic on the Grass (1959)
  - The Elusive Corporal (1962)
  - The Little Theatre of Jean Renoir (1970)

Tony Richardson

- John Addison
  - The Entertainer (1960)
  - A Taste of Honey (1961)
  - The Loneliness of the Long Distance Runner (1962)
  - Tom Jones (1963)
  - The Loved One (1965)
  - The Charge of the Light Brigade (1968)
  - Dead Cert (1974)
  - Joseph Andrews (1977)

Jay Roach

- Theodore Shapiro
  - Dinner for Schmucks (2010)
  - Game Change (2012)
  - The Campaign (2012)
  - Trumbo (2015)
  - Bombshell (2019)

Yves Robert

- Vladimir Cosma
  - Very Happy Alexander (1968)
  - Clerambard (1969)
  - The Tall Blond Man with One Black Shoe (1972)
  - Hail the Artist (1973)
  - The Return of the Tall Blond Man with One Black Shoe (1974)
  - Pardon Mon Affaire (1976)
  - Pardon Mon Affaire, Too! (1977)
  - Courage fuyons (1979)
  - The Twin (1984)
  - My Father's Glory (1990)
  - My Mother's Castle (1990)

Robert Rodriguez

- John Debney
  - Spy Kids (2001)
  - Spy Kids 2: The Island of Lost Dreams (2002)
  - Sin City (2005)
  - The Adventures of Sharkboy and Lavagirl in 3-D (2005)
  - Predators (2010)
- Carl Thiel
  - Planet Terror (2007)
  - Shorts (2009)
  - Spy Kids: All the Time in the World (2011)
  - Machete Kills (2013)
  - Sin City: A Dame to Kill For (2014)

Nicolas Roeg

- Stanley Myers
  - Eureka (1983)
  - Castaway (1986)
  - Track 29 (1988)
  - The Witches (1990)
  - Cold Heaven (1991)
  - Heart of Darkness (1993)

Stuart Rosenberg

- Lalo Schifrin
  - Cool Hand Luke (1967)
  - WUSA (1970)
  - Voyage of the Damned (1976)
  - Love and Bullets (1979)
  - The Amityville Horror (1979)
  - Brubaker (1980)

Roberto Rossellini

- Renzo Rossellini
  - A Pilot Returns (1942)
  - The Man with a Cross (1943)
  - Rome, Open City (1945)
  - Desire (1946)
  - Paisan (1946)
  - Germany, Year Zero (1948)
  - L'amore (1948)
  - Stromboli (1950)
  - The Flowers of St. Francis (1950)
  - The Machine That Kills Bad People (1952)
  - Europe '51 (1952)
  - Rivalry (1953)
  - Where Is Freedom? (1954)
  - Fear (1954)
  - General Della Rovere (1959)
  - Escape by Night (1960)
  - Garibaldi (1961)
  - Vanina Vanini (1961)

Alan Rudolph

- Mark Isham
  - Trouble in Mind (1985)
  - Made in Heaven (1987)
  - The Moderns (1988)
  - Love at Large (1990)
  - Mortal Thoughts (1991)
  - Mrs. Parker and the Vicious Circle (1994)
  - Afterglow (1996)
  - Breakfast of Champions (1999)
  - Trixie (2000)

Raúl Ruiz

- Jorge Arriagada
  - Dog's Dialogue (1977)
  - The Suspended Vocation (1978)
  - The Hypothesis of the Stolen Painting (1979)
  - The Territory (1981)
  - On Top of the Whale (1982)
  - City of Pirates (1983)
  - Three Crowns of the Sailor (1983)
  - Manoel's Destinies (1985)
  - Treasure Island (1985)
  - The Insomniac on the Bridge (1985)
  - Life Is a Dream (1986)
  - The Blind Owl (1987)
  - Dark at Noon (1993)
  - Three Lives and Only One Death (1996)
  - Genealogies of a Crime (1997)
  - Shattered Image (1998)
  - Time Regained (1999)
  - Comedy of Innocence (2000)
  - Love Torn in a Dream (2000)
  - Savage Souls (2001)
  - Cofralandes, Chilean Rhapsody (2002)
  - A Place Among the Living (2003)
  - That Day (2003)
  - Days in the Country (2004)
  - The Lost Domain (2005)
  - Klimt (2006)
  - Nucingen House (2008)
  - Litoral (2008)
  - Mysteries of Lisbon (2010)
  - Night Across the Street (2012)

Russo brothers

- Alan Silvestri
  - Avengers: Infinity War (2018)
  - Avengers: Endgame (2019)
  - The Electric State (2025)
  - Avengers: Doomsday (2026)
  - Avengers: Secret Wars (2027)

== S ==
Luciano Salce

- Ennio Morricone
  - The Fascist (1961)
  - La voglia matta (English: "Crazy Desire") (1962)
  - La cuccagna (English: "A Girl... and a Million") (1962)
  - Le Monachine (English: "The Little Nuns") (1963)
  - Slalom (1965)
  - El Greco (1966)
  - Come imparai ad amare le donne (English: "How I Learned to Love Women") (1967)
  - Dove vai in vacanza? (English: "Where Are You Going on Holiday?") (1978)

Carlos Saldanha

- John Powell
  - Ice Age: The Meltdown (2006)
  - Ice Age: Dawn of the Dinosaurs (2009)
  - Rio (2011)
  - Rio 2 (2014)
  - Ferdinand (2017)

Joseph Sargent

- Charles Bernstein
  - White Lightning (1973)
  - Coast to Coast (1980)
  - Caroline? (1990)
  - Ivory Hunters (1990)
  - The Love She Sought (1990)
  - Somebody's Daughter (1992)
  - Miss Evers' Boys (1997)
  - The Long Island Incident (1998)
  - Out of the Ashes (2003)
  - Sybil (2007)
  - Sweet Nothing in My Ear (2008)
- Billy Goldenberg
  - The Marcus-Nelson Murders (1973)
  - Memorial Day (1983)
  - Love Is Never Silent (1985)
  - There Must Be a Pony (1986)
  - Miss Rose White (1992)

Claude Sautet

- Philippe Sarde
  - The Things of Life (1970)
  - Max and the Junkmen (1971)
  - César and Rosalie (1972)
  - Vincent, François, Paul and the Others (1974)
  - Mado (1976)
  - A Simple Story (1978)
  - A Bad Son (1980)
  - Garçon! (1983)
  - The Long Island Incident (1998)
  - A Few Days with Me (1988)
  - Nelly and Mr. Arnaud (1995)

John Sayles

- Mason Daring
  - Return of the Secaucus Seven (1979)
  - Lianna (1983)
  - The Brother from Another Planet (1984)
  - Matewan (1987)
  - Eight Men Out (1988)
  - City of Hope (1991)
  - Passion Fish (1992)
  - The Secret of Roan Inish (1994)
  - Lone Star (1996)
  - Men With Guns (1997)
  - Limbo (1999)
  - Sunshine State (2002)
  - Silver City (2004)
  - Honeydripper (2007)
  - Amigo (2010)
  - Go for Sisters (2013)

Franklin J. Schaffner

- Jerry Goldsmith
  - The Stripper (1963)
  - Planet of the Apes (1968)
  - Patton (1970)
  - Papillon (1973)
  - Islands in the Stream (1977)
  - The Boys from Brazil (1978)
  - Lionheart (1987)

Fred Schepisi

- Jerry Goldsmith
  - The Russia House (1990)
  - Mr. Baseball (1992)
  - Six Degrees of Separation (1993)
  - I.Q. (1994)
  - Fierce Creatures (1997)
- Bruce Smeaton
  - The Devil's Playground (1976)
  - The Chant of Jimmie Blacksmith (1978)
  - Barbarosa (1982)
  - Iceman (1984)
  - Plenty (1985)
  - Roxanne (1987)
  - A Cry in the Dark (1988)

Paul Schrader

- Angelo Badalamenti
  - The Comfort of Strangers (1990)
  - Witch Hunt (1994)
  - Forever Mine (1999)
  - Auto Focus (2002)
  - Dominion: Prequel to the Exorcist (2005)

Martin Scorsese

- Howard Shore
  - After Hours (1985)
  - Made in Milan (1990)
  - Gangs of New York (2002)
  - The Aviator (2004)
  - The Departed (2006)
  - Hugo (2011)

Ridley Scott

- Hans Zimmer
  - Black Rain (1989)
  - Thelma and Louise (1991)
  - Gladiator (2000)
  - Hannibal (2001)
  - Black Hawk Down (2001)
  - Matchstick Men (2003)
- Harry Gregson-Williams
  - Kingdom of Heaven (2005)
  - The Martian (2015)
  - The Last Duel (2021)
  - House of Gucci (2021)
  - Gladiator II (2024)
  - The Dog Stars (2026)

Tony Scott

- Harry Gregson-Williams
  - Spy Game (2001)
  - The Hire: Beat the Devil (2002)
  - Man on Fire (2004)
  - Domino (2005)
  - Déjà Vu (2006)
  - The Taking of Pelham 123 (2009)
  - Unstoppable (2010)

George Seaton

- Alfred Newman
  - Chicken Every Sunday (1949)
  - The Big Lift (1950)
  - For Heaven's Sake (1950)
  - The Pleasure of His Company (1961)
  - The Counterfeit Traitor (1962)
  - Airport (1970)

Tom Shadyac

- John Debney
  - Liar Liar (1997)
  - Dragonfly (2002)
  - Bruce Almighty (2003)
  - Evan Almighty (2007)
  - Brian Banks (2019)

S. Shankar

- A. R. Rahman
  - Gentleman (1993)
  - Kaadhalan (1994)
  - Indian (1996)
  - Jeans (1998)
  - Mudhalvan (1999)
  - Nayak: The Real Hero (2001)
  - Boys (2003)
  - Sivaji (2007)
  - Enthiran (2010)
  - I (2015)

Gary Sherman

- Joe Renzetti
  - Dead & Buried (1981)
  - Mysterious Two (1982)
  - Wanted: Dead or Alive (1987)
  - Poltergeist III (1988)
  - Lisa (1990)
  - 39: A Film by Carroll McKane (2006)

Kaneto Shindō

- Hikaru Hayashi
  - Lucky Dragon No. 5 (1959)
  - The Naked Island (1960)
  - Ningen (1962)
  - Mother (1963)
  - Onibaba (1964)
  - Akuto (1965)
  - Lost Sex. (1966)
  - Kuroneko (1968)
  - Heat Wave Island (1969)
  - Live Today, Die Tomorrow!. (1970)
  - Sanka (1972)
  - The Heart (1973)
  - The Life of Chikuzan. (1977)
  - Edo Porn (1981)
  - Burakkubōdo (1986)
  - Tree Without Leaves. (1986)
  - Sakura-tai Chiru (1988)
  - A Last Note (1995)
  - Will to Live. (1999)
  - By Player (2000)
  - Owl (2003)
  - Postcard (2010)
- Akira Ifukube
  - Children of Hiroshima. (1952)
  - Epitome (1953)
  - Life of a Woman (1953)
  - Dobu. (1954)
  - Wolf (1955)
  - Shirogane Shinjū (1956)
  - Ruri no Kishi. (1956)
  - An Actress (1956)
  - Umi no Yarōdomo (1957)
  - Sorrow Is Only for Women. (1958)

M. Night Shyamalan

- James Newton Howard
  - The Sixth Sense (1999)
  - Unbreakable (2000)
  - Signs (2002)
  - The Village (2004)
  - Lady in the Water (2006)
  - The Happening (2008)
  - The Last Airbender (2010)
  - After Earth (2013)
  - Remain (2027)

Vittorio De Sica

- Alessandro Cicognini
  - Shoeshine (1946)
  - Bicycle Thieves (1948)
  - Miracle in Milan (1951)
  - Umberto D. (1952)
  - Indiscretion of an American Wife (1953)
  - The Gold of Naples (1954)
  - The Roof (1956)

Don Siegel

- Lalo Schifrin
  - Coogan's Bluff (1968)
  - The Beguiled (1971)
  - Dirty Harry (1971)
  - Charley Varrick (1973)
  - Telefon (1977)

Bryan Singer

- John Ottman
  - Public Access (1993)
  - The Usual Suspects (1995)
  - Apt Pupil (1998)
  - X2 (2003)
  - Superman Returns (2006)
  - Valkyrie (2008)
  - Jack the Giant Slayer (2013)
  - X-Men: Days of Future Past (2014)
  - X-Men: Apocalypse (2016)
  - Bohemian Rhapsody (2018)

Douglas Sirk

- Frank Skinner
  - Taza, Son of Cochise (1954)
  - Magnificent Obsession (1954)
  - Sign of the Pagan (1954)
  - All That Heaven Allows (1955)
  - Never Say Goodbye (1956)
  - Written on the Wind (1956)
  - Battle Hymn (1957)
  - Intertude (1957)
  - The Tarnished Angels (1958)
  - Imitation of Life (1959)

Jerzy Skolimowski

- Stanley Myers
  - King, Queen, Knave (1972)
  - Moonlighting (1982)
  - Success Is the Best Revenge (1984)
  - The Lightship (1985)
  - Torrents of Spring (1989)

Kevin Smith

- James L. Venable
  - Jay and Silent Bob Strike Back (2001)
  - Jersey Girl (2004)
  - Clerks II (2006)
  - Zack and Miri Make a Porno (2008)
  - Jay & Silent Bob's Super Groovy Cartoon Movie (2013)
  - Jay and Silent Bob Reboot (2019)

Steven Soderbergh

- David Holmes
  - Out of Sight (1998)
  - Ocean's Eleven (2001)
  - Ocean's Twelve (2004)
  - Ocean's Thirteen (2007)
  - Haywire (2011)
  - Logan Lucky (2017)
  - Mosaic (2018)
  - The Laundromat (2019)
  - No Sudden Move (2021)
  - Black Bag (2025)
  - The Christophers (2026)
- Cliff Martinez
  - Sex, Lies, and Videotape (1989)
  - Kafka (1991)
  - King of the Hill (1993)
  - The Underneath (1995)
  - Gray's Anatomy (1996)
  - Schizopolis (1996)
  - The Limey (1999)
  - Traffic (2000)
  - Solaris (2002)
  - Contagion (2011)
  - The Knick (2014–2015)
  - Kimi (2022)

Alberto Sordi

- Piero Piccioni
  - Smoke Over London (1966)
  - Pardon, Are You For or Against? (1966)
  - An Italian in America (1967)
  - Help Me, My Love (1969)
  - Polvere di stelle (1973)
  - While There's War There's Hope (1974)
  - A Common Sense of Modesty (1976)
  - Storia di un italiano (1979)
  - Catherine and I (1980)
  - I Know That You Know That I Know (1982)
  - Journey with Papa (1982)
  - Il tassinaro (1983)
  - Everybody in Jail (1984)
  - A Taxi Driver in New York (1987)
  - Acquitted for Having Committed the Deed (1993)
  - Nestore l'ultima corsa (1996)
  - Incontri proibiti (1998)

Steven Spielberg

- John Williams
  - The Sugarland Express (1974)
  - Jaws (1975)
  - Close Encounters of the Third Kind (1977)
  - 1941 (1979)
  - Raiders of the Lost Ark (1981)
  - E.T. the Extra-Terrestrial (1982)
  - Indiana Jones and the Temple of Doom (1984)
  - Empire of the Sun (1987)
  - Always (1989)
  - Indiana Jones and the Last Crusade (1989)
  - Hook (1991)
  - Jurassic Park (1993)
  - Schindler's List (1993)
  - The Lost World: Jurassic Park (1997)
  - Amistad (1997)
  - Saving Private Ryan (1998)
  - The Unfinished Journey (1999)
  - A.I. Artificial Intelligence (2001)
  - Minority Report (2002)
  - Catch Me If You Can (2002)
  - The Terminal (2004)
  - War of the Worlds (2005)
  - Munich (2005)
  - Indiana Jones and the Kingdom of the Crystal Skull (2008)
  - The Adventures of Tintin (2011)
  - War Horse (2011)
  - Lincoln (2012)
  - The BFG (2016)
  - The Post (2017)
  - The Fabelmans (2022)
  - Disclosure Day (2026)

Ben Stassen

- Ramin Djawadi
  - Fly Me to the Moon (2008)
  - A Turtle's Tale: Sammy's Adventures (2010)
  - A Turtle's Tale 2: Sammy's Escape from Paradise (2012)
  - The House of Magic (2013)
  - The Wild Life (2016)

George Stevens

- Roy Webb
  - Kentucky Kernels (1934)
  - Laddie (1935)
  - The Nitwits (1935)
  - Alice Adams (1935)
  - Quality Street (1937)
  - Vivacious Lady (1938)
  - I Remember Mama (1948)

Robert Stevenson

- George Bruns
  - Johnny Tremain (1957)
  - The Absent Minded Professor (1961)
  - Son of Flubber (1963)
  - The Love Bug (1968)
  - Herbie Rides Again (1974)

John Stockwell

- Paul Haslinger
  - Cheaters (2000)
  - Crazy/Beautiful (2001)
  - Blue Crush (2002)
  - Into the Blue (2005)
  - Turistas (2006)
  - Seal Team Six: The Raid on Osama Bin Laden (2012)
  - In the Blood (2014)

Tim Story

- Christopher Lennertz
  - Think Like a Man (2012)
  - Ride Along (2014)
  - Think Like a Man Too (2014)
  - Ride Along 2 (2016)
  - Shaft (2019)
  - Tom & Jerry (2021)

Mel Stuart

- Lalo Schifrin
  - The Way Out Men (1965)
  - Wall Street Where the Money is (1966)
  - The Making of a President: 1964 (1965)
  - I Love My Wife (1970)
  - Up from the Ape (1975)
  - Brenda Starr (1976)

John Sturges

- Elmer Bernstein
  - The Magnificent Seven (1960)
  - By Love Possessed (1961)
  - A Girl Named Tamiko (1962)
  - The Great Escape (1963)
  - The Hallelujah Trail (1965)
  - McQ (1974)

== T ==
Béla Tarr

- Mihály Vig
  - Almanac of Fall (1984)
  - Damnation (1988)
  - Satantango (1994)
  - Werckmeister Harmonies (2000)
  - The Man from London (2007)
  - The Turin Horse (2011)

Frank Tashlin

- Walter Scharf
  - Hollywood or Bust (1956)
  - Rock-A-Bye Baby (1958)
  - The Geisha Boy (1958)
  - Cinderfella (1960)
  - It's Only Money (1962)

Norman Taurog

- Walter Scharf
  - You Can't Have Everything (1937)
  - Living It Up (1954)
  - You're Never Too Young (1955)
  - The Birds and the Bees (1956)
  - Bundle of Joy (1956)
  - Don't Give Up the Ship (1959)
  - Tickle Me (1965)

Julie Taymor

- Elliot Goldenthal
  - Titus (1999)
  - Frida (2002)
  - Across the Universe (2007)
  - The Tempest (2010)
  - A Midsummer Night's Dream (2014)
  - The Glorias (2020)

Bertrand Tavernier

- Philippe Sarde
  - The Clockmaker of St. Paul (1974)
  - Spoiled Children (1977)
  - Coup de Torchon (1981)
  - L.627 (1992)
  - Revenge of the Musketeers (1994)
  - The Princess of Montpensier (2010)
  - The French Minister (2013)

Andy Tennant

- George Fenton
  - Ever After (1998)
  - Anna and the King (1999)
  - Sweet Home Alabama (2002)
  - Hitch (2005)
  - Fool's Gold (2008)
  - The Bounty Hunter (2010)
  - Wild Oats (2016)
  - The Secret: Dare to Dream (2020)
  - Unit 234 (2023)

Giuseppe Tornatore

- Ennio Morricone
  - Everybody's Fine (1990)
  - A Pure Formality (1994)
  - The Star Maker (1995)
  - The Legend of 1900 (1998)
  - Malèna (2000)
  - The Unknown Woman (2006)
  - Baarìa (2009)
  - The Best Offer (2013)
  - The Correspondence (2016)

Andre De Toth

- David Buttolph
  - Carson City (1952)
  - House of Wax (1953)
  - Crime Wave (1953)
  - Thunder Over the Plains (1953)
  - Riding Shotgun (1954)
  - The Bounty Hunter (1954)

Jacques Tourneur

- Roy Webb
  - Cat People (1942)
  - I Walked with a Zombie (1943)
  - The Leopard Man (1943)
  - Experiment Perilous (1944)
  - Out of the Past (1947)
  - Easy Living (1949)

François Truffaut

- Georges Delerue
  - Shoot the Piano Player (1960)
  - Jules and Jim (1961)
  - The Soft Skin (1964)
  - Two English Girls (1971)
  - Such a Gorgeous Kid Like Me (1972)
  - Day for Night (1973)
  - Love on the Run (1979)
  - The Last Metro (1980)
  - The Woman Next Door (1981)
  - Confidentially Yours (1983)

== V ==
W. S. Van Dyke

- Herbert Stothart
  - The Cuban Love Song (1931)
  - Laughing Boy (1934)
  - San Francisco (1936)
  - After the Thin Man (1936)
  - Rosalie (1937)
  - Marie Antoinette (1938)
  - Sweethearts (1938)
  - Bitter Sweet (1940)
  - I Married an Angel (1942)
  - Cairo (1942)

Gus Van Sant

- Danny Elfman
  - To Die For (1995)
  - Good Will Hunting (1997)
  - Milk (2008)
  - Restless (2011)
  - Promised Land (2012)
  - Don't Worry, He Won't Get Far on Foot (2018)
  - Dead Man's Wire (2025)

Gore Verbinski

- Hans Zimmer
  - The Ring (2002)
  - The Weather Man (2005)
  - Pirates of the Caribbean: Dead Man's Chest (2006)
  - Pirates of the Caribbean: At World's End (2007)
  - Rango (2011)
  - The Lone Ranger (2013)

Henri Verneuil

- Ennio Morricone
  - The Sicilian Clan (1969)
  - The Burglars (1971) Italian: "Le Casse"
  - Night Flight from Moscow (1973)
  - The Night Caller (1975)
  - I as in Icarus (1979)

King Vidor

- Alfred Newman
  - Street Scene (1931)
  - Cynara (1932)
  - Our Daily Bread (1934)
  - The Wedding Night (1935)
  - Stella Dallas (1937)

== W ==
The Wachowskis

- Don Davis
  - Bound (1996)
  - The Matrix (1999)
  - The Animatrix (2003)
  - The Matrix Reloaded (2003)
  - The Matrix Revolutions (2003)

David Wain

- Craig Wedren
  - Wet Hot American Summer (2001)
  - The Ten (2007)
  - Wainy Days (2007)
  - Role Models (2008)
  - Wanderlust (2012)
  - They Came Together (2014)
  - Wet Hot American Summer: First Day of Camp (2015)
  - Wet Hot American Summer: Ten Years Later (2017)
  - A Futile and Stupid Gesture (2018)

Raoul Walsh

- Max Steiner
  - They Died with Their Boots On (1941)
  - Desperate Journey (1942)
  - The Man I Love (1946)
  - Pursued (1947)
  - Cheyenne (1947)
  - Fighter Squadron (1948)
  - White Heat (1949)
  - Distant Drums (1951)
  - Battle Cry (1955)
  - Band of Angels (1957)
  - A Distant Trumpet (1964)
- Adolph Deutsch
  - They Drive by Night (1940)
  - High Sierra (1941)
  - Manpower (1941)
  - Northern Pursuit (1943)
  - Uncertain Glory (1944)

James Wan

- Joseph Bishara
  - Insidious (2010)
  - The Conjuring (2013)
  - Insidious: Chapter 2 (2013)
  - The Conjuring 2 (2016)
  - Malignant (2021)

Régis Wargnier

- Patrick Doyle
  - Indochine (1992)
  - A French Woman (1995)
  - East/West (1999)
  - Man to Man (2005)
  - Have Mercy on Us All (2007)
  - La Ligne droite (2011)

Shinichirō Watanabe

- Yoko Kanno
  - Macross Plus (1994)
  - Cowboy Bebop (1998–1999)
  - Cowboy Bebop: The Movie (2001)
  - Kids on the Slope (2012)
  - Terror in Resonance (2014)

Mark Waters

- Rolfe Kent
  - Freaky Friday (2003)
  - Mean Girls (2004)
  - Just Like Heaven (2005)
  - Ghosts of Girlfriends Past (2009)
  - Mr. Popper's Penguins (2011)
  - Vampire Academy (2014)
  - Magic Camp (2020)

Keoni Waxman

- Philip White
  - The Keeper (2009)
  - Hunt to Kill (2010)
  - Maximum Conviction (2012)
  - Force of Execution (2013)
  - Absolution (2015)
  - End of a Gun (2016)
  - Contract to Kill (2016)
  - Cartels (2017)
  - The Hard Way (2019)

Peter Weir

- Maurice Jarre
  - The Year of Living Dangerously (1982)
  - Witness (1985)
  - The Mosquito Coast (1986)
  - Dead Poets Society (1989)
  - Fearless (1993)

William A. Wellman

- Alfred Newman
  - Call of the Wild (1935)
  - Beau Geste (1939)
  - Roxie Hart (1942)
  - The Iron Curtain (1948)
  - Yellow Sky (1948)

Wim Wenders

- Jürgen Knieper
  - The Goalie's Anxiety at the Penalty Kick (1972)
  - The Scarlet Letter (1973)
  - Wrong Move (1975)
  - The American Friend (1977)
  - Room 666 (1982)
  - The State of Things (1982)
  - Wings of Desire (1987)
  - Lisbon Story (1994)

Paul Wendkos

- Billy Goldenberg
  - Fear No Evil (1969)
  - Terror on the Beach (1973)
  - The Legend of Lizzie Borden (1975)
  - Intimate Agony (1983)
  - The Awakening of Candra (1983)
  - Scorned and Swindled (1984)
  - Rage of Angels: The Story Continues (1986)
  - Message from Nam (1993)

Billy Wilder

- Miklós Rózsa
  - Five Graves to Cairo (1943)
  - Double Indemnity (1944)
  - The Lost Weekend (1945)
  - The Private Life of Sherlock Holmes (1970)
  - Fedora (1978)

Michael Winner

- Jerry Fielding
  - Lawman (1971)
  - The Nightcomers (1971)
  - Chato's Land (1972)
  - The Mechanic (1972)
  - Scorpio (1973)
  - The Big Sleep (1978)

Park Chan-wook

- Yeong-wook Jo
  - Joint Security Area (2000)
  - Yeoseot gae ui siseon (2003)
  - Oldboy (2003)
  - Lady Vengeance (2005)
  - I'm a Cyborg, But That's OK (2006)
  - Thirst (2009)
  - Night Fishing (2011)
  - The Handmaiden (2016)
  - Decision to Leave (2022)
  - No Other Choice (2025)

Joe Wright

- Dario Marianelli
  - Pride & Prejudice (2005)
  - Atonement (2007)
  - The Soloist (2009)
  - Anna Karenina (2012)
  - Darkest Hour (2017)

== Y ==
Takashi Yamazaki

- Naoki Satō
  - Always: Sunset on Third Street (2005)
  - Always: Sunset on Third Street 2 (2007)
  - Ballad (2009)
  - Space Battleship Yamato (2010)
  - Friends: Mononoke Shima no Naki (2011)
  - Always: Sunset on Third Street '64 (2012)
  - The Eternal Zero (2013)
  - Stand by Me Doraemon (2014)
  - Parasyte: Part 1 (2014)
  - Parasyte: Part 2 (2015)
  - Fueled: The Man They Called Pirate (2016)
  - Destiny: The Tale of Kamakura (2017)
  - The Great War of Archimedes (2019)
  - Stand by Me Doraemon 2 (2020)
  - Ghost Book Obakezukan (2022)
  - Godzilla Minus One (2023)
  - Godzilla Minus Zero (2026)

David Yates

- Nicholas Hooper
  - Punch (1996)
  - The Tichborne Claimant (1998)
  - The Young Visiters (2003)
  - The Girl in the Café (2005)
  - Harry Potter and the Order of the Phoenix (2007)
  - Harry Potter and the Half-Blood Prince (2009)

Wilson Yip

- Kenji Kawai
  - Dragon Tiger Gate (2006)
  - Ip Man (2008)
  - Ip Man 2 (2010)
  - Ip Man 3 (2015)
  - Ip Man 4: The Finale (2019)

== Z ==
Alex Zamm

- Chris Hajian
  - Chairman of the Board (1998)
  - Inspector Gadget 2 (2003)
  - The Haunting Hour: Don't Think About It (2007)
  - Dr. Dolittle: Million Dollar Mutts (2009)
  - Beverly Hills Chihuahua 2 (2011)
  - Tooth Fairy 2 (2012)
  - The Little Rascals Save the Day (2014)
  - A Royal Christmas (2014)
  - Jingle All the Way 2 (2014)
  - Crown for Christmas (2015)
  - Woody Woodpecker (2017)

Robert Zemeckis

- Alan Silvestri
  - Romancing the Stone (1984)
  - Back to the Future (1985)
  - Who Framed Roger Rabbit (1988)
  - Back to the Future Part II (1989)
  - Back to the Future Part III (1990)
  - Death Becomes Her (1992)
  - Forrest Gump (1994)
  - Contact (1997)
  - What Lies Beneath (2000)
  - Cast Away (2000)
  - The Polar Express (2004)
  - Beowulf (2007)
  - A Christmas Carol (2009)
  - Flight (2012)
  - The Walk (2015)
  - Allied (2016)
  - Welcome to Marwen (2018)
  - The Witches (2020)
  - Pinocchio (2022)
  - Here (2024)

David Zucker

- Ira Newborn
  - The Naked Gun: From the Files of Police Squad! (1988)
  - The Naked Gun 2½: The Smell of Fear (1991)
  - Naked Gun 33 1/3: The Final Insult (1994)
  - High School High (1996)
  - BASEketball (1998)

Andrzej Zulawski

- Andrzej Korzynski
  - The Third Part of the Night (1971)
  - The Devil (1972)
  - Possession (1981)
  - On the Silver Globe (1988)
  - My Nights Are More Beautiful Than Your Days (1989)
  - Szamanka (1996)
  - Fidelity (2000)
  - Cosmos (2015)
