= Ron Foster (actor) =

American actor (1930–2015)

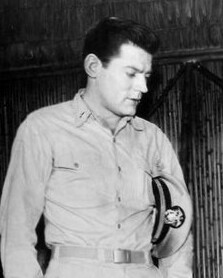
- Foster in Alcoa Premiere (1962)
- Born: Ronald R. Foster; February 19, 1930; Wichita, Kansas, US
- Died: February 26, 2015 (aged 85); Placerville, California US
- Occupation: Actor
- Years active: 1956–2008

Ronald R. Foster (February 19, 1930 – February 26, 2015) was an American actor.

== Partial filmography ==
- The Proud and Profane (1956) – Bolton (uncredited)
- The Storm Rider (1957) – Burns (uncredited)
- Under Fire (1957) – Lieutenant (uncredited)
- Young and Dangerous (1957) – Rock's Buddy (uncredited)
- Rockabilly Baby (1957) – Carnival Barker (uncredited)
- Cattle Empire (1958) – Stitch (uncredited)
- Thundering Jets (1958) – Control Tower Sergeant (uncredited)
- Desert Hell (1958) – Pvt. Bergstrom
- Diary of a High School Bride (1959) – Steve
- Ma Barker's Killer Brood (1960) – Doc
- Three Came to Kill (1960) – Herb Morely (uncredited)
- The Music Box Kid (1960) – Larry Shaw
- Cage of Evil (1960) – Det. Scott Harper
- The Walking Target (1960) – Nick Harbin
- Operation Bottleneck (1961) – Lt. Rulan H. Voss
- Secret of Deep Harbor (1961) – Skip Hanlon
- House of the Dammed (1963) – Scott Campbell
- Private Lessons (1981) – Fillmore
- Ninja III: The Domination (1984) – Jiminez

== Other television roles ==
- The Silent Service (1957-1958) Quartermaster / 2nd Sailor / Soundman / Lt. Andrews / Lt. Walker
- Highway Patrol (1957-1959) Officer Garvey / Dispatcher / Officer / Officer 1410 / Officer 3220 / Officer Dennis / Officer Dorsey / Officer Foster / Officer Garvey - Unit 2108 / Plainclothes Officer / Sgt. Garvey / Unit 2174 / Unit 2370 / Unit 3110 (24 episodes)
- Official Detective "Murder In A Girls' School" - Miller Dolce (1958)
- Peter Gunn "Murder on the Midway" - Martin Franklin (1958)
- Perry Mason as Fred Pike in "The Case of the Prudent Prosecutor" (1960) loop
- The Life and Legend of Wyatt Earp as Johnny in "Arizona Lottery" (1960)
- Sea Hunt, twice (1959–1960, Season 3, Episode 18)
- Colt .45 as Tommy Potts in "Bounty List" (1960)
- Checkmate as Bill in "The Mask of Vengeance" (1960)
- Bat Masterson, twice as Toby Dawson in "Six Feet of Gold" (1960) and as Sheriff Buck Simpson in "Jeopardy at Jackson Hole" (1961)
- Gunsmoke, twice (1961); As Cole Treadwell in “Bless Me Till I Die” (S6E31) & Jim Garza in “Nina’s Revenge” (S7E12).
- Rawhide (1961) – as Bill Rudd in S3:E12, "Incident at the Top of the World"
- Tales of Wells Fargo as Ken Logan in "Royal Maroon" (1962)
- Alcoa Premiere as Lieutenant Durham in "Seven Against the Sea" (1962)
- Laramie as Lee Taylor in "The Wedding Party" (1963)
- The Virginian as Charlie Dorsey in "The Money Cage" (1963)
- G.E. True as Captain James Dunlop in "Black Market" (1963)
- The Twilight Zone as Sgt. William Connors in Season 5 Episode 10: “The 7th Is Made Up of Phantoms" (1963)
- The Outer Limits as Dr. Robert Richardson in "The Mice" (1964)
- Kraft Suspense Theatre as Reverend Larson in "Portrait of an Unknown Man" (1964)
- Combat! as Private Marshall in "Crossfire" (1965)
- 12 O'Clock High as Captain Borega in "Gauntlet of Fire" (1966)
- Bonanza as Al Mooney in S6 E1 "Invention of a Gunfighter" (1964) and ranch hand Stark in S8 E1 "Something Hurt, Something Wild" (1966)
- Run for Your Life as Major Conway in "Rendezvous in Tokyo" (1967)
- The High Chaparral as Lieutenant Corey in "The Peacemaker" (1968)
- The Bill Cosby Show as Dr. Madeo in "Let X Equal a Lousy Weekend" (1969)
- O'Hara, U.S. Treasury as Al Ellis in "Operation Crystal Springs" (1970)
- Petrocelli, twice (1974 and 1976)
- Dynasty, as a sheriff in "Colorado Roulette" (1988)
