= Grant Richards (actor) =

American actor (1911–1963)

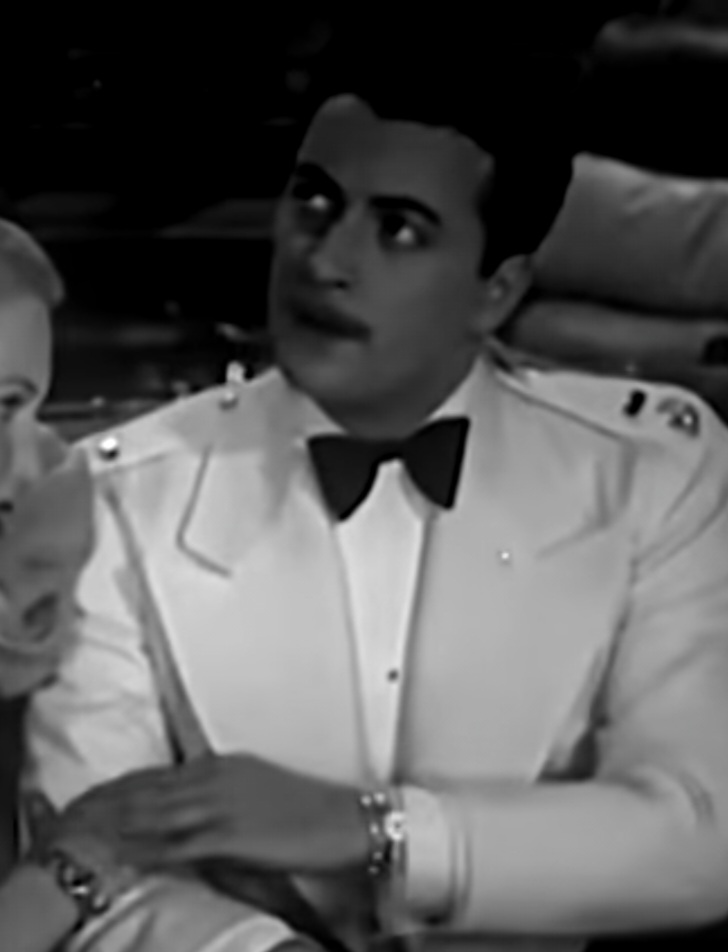
- Richards in Isle of Destiny (1940)
- Born: Irwin Jaffe; December 12, 1911
- Died: July 4, 1963 (aged 51); Los Angeles, California, U.S.
- Occupation: Actor
- Years active: 1936–1963
- Spouse(s): Joan Valerie (? – 1943); Jean Stevens (? – 1945)

Grant Richards (born Irwin Jaffe, December 21, 1911 – July 4, 1963) was an American actor, who appeared mainly in movies in the late 1930s through to the late 1950s.

== Early years ==
When he was known as Irwin Jaffe, Richards was a student at the University of Miami for three years. He performed in dramatic productions at the university and in the city's Civic Theater.

== Career ==
In 1937, he became the first actor in the Federal Theatre Project to gain a film contract, signing with the Major Pictures company.

His films include On Such a Night (1937) and Guns, Girls, and Gangsters (1959). Richards made three guest appearances on Perry Mason: as Jerry Haywood in the 1958 episodes "The Case of the Haunted Husband," and as Captain Kennedy in "The Case of the Sardonic Sargeant"; followed by the role of murder victim George Sherwin in the 1961 episode, "The Case of the Missing Melody". He also appeared in several episodes of ABC's The Untouchables.

In 1958, he played the gunfighter and saloon owner Luke Short in an episode of the western series, The Life and Legend of Wyatt Earp. In 1962 he played Keeler, a crooked gambler, in The Rifleman episode “Tinhorn”.

== Personal life and death ==
During the 1940s, Richards was briefly married to actresses Joan Valerie–with whom he had one daughter–and Jean Stevens, both marriages ending in divorce.

On July 4, 1963, Richards died of leukemia in Hollywood.

== Filmography ==
Year	Title	Role	Notes
1936	Hopalong Cassidy Returns	Bob Claiborne	
1937	Night of Mystery	Philo Vance	
1937	On Such a Night	Nicky Last	
1937	Love on Toast	Clark 'Sandy' Sanford	
1938	My Old Kentucky Home	Larry Blair	
1938	Under the Big Top	Pablo Le Grande	
1939	Risky Business	Jack Norman	
1939	Inside Information	Charles Bixby	
1940	Isle of Destiny	Lt. George Allerton	
1942	Just Off Broadway	John F. McGonagle - Asst. District Attorney	
1959	Guns Girls and Gangsters	Joe Darren	
1959	Inside the Mafia	Johnny Lucero	
1959	The Four Skulls of Jonathan Drake	Police Lt. Jeff Rowan	
1960	Oklahoma Territory	Bigelow	
1960	Twelve Hours to Kill	Detective Lt. Jim Carnevan	
1960	The Music Box Kid	Chesty Miller	
1961	You Have to Run Fast	'Big Jim' Craven	
1961	Secret of Deep Harbor	Rick Correll	
