= On Such a Night (1937 film) =

1937 film by Ewald André Dupont

- Directed by: Ewald André Dupont
- Written by: Morley F. Cassidy; S. S. Field; John D. Klorer
- Produced by: Adolph Zukor
- Starring: Grant Richards; Karen Morley; Roscoe Karns
- Cinematography: Charles Schoenbaum
- Distributed by: Paramount Pictures
- Release date: September 16, 1937 (New York)
- Running time: 71 minutes
- Country: United States
- Language: English

On Such a Night is a 1937 American crime film directed by Ewald André Dupont and starring Grant Richards, Karen Morley and Roscoe Karns. It was produced and distributed by Paramount Pictures and sold to MCA-Universal in 1958 for television syndication.

== Cast ==
- Grant Richards as Nicky Last
- Karen Morley as Gail Stanley
- Roscoe Karns as Joe Flynn
- Eduardo Ciannelli as Ice Richmond
- Milly as Mlle. Mimi Candle
- Alan Mowbray as Professor Ricardo Montrose Candle
- Robert McWade as Colonel Fentridge
- Esther Dale as Miss Belinda Fentridge
- John Wray as Guard Rumann
- Frank Reicher as Horace Darwin
- Paul Fix as Maxie Barnes

== Reception ==
In a contemporary review for The New York Times, critic Bosley Crowther wrote: "The atmosphere of a flood-stricken area under the bleakness of continual driving rain has been reproduced with such vigor and realism that every one except, perhaps, confirmed hydrophobiacs will make allowances for the cheap melodramatics of the story."

Variety also noted the effectiveness of the flood scenes, and stated that they served "only to heighten the deficiencies of the story and its development." It commented that the film provided, "Another striking example that a picture is as good as its story, and no better. This one has so many confusing and baffling twists, and indefinitely conceived characters, that the thread of the narrative is soon lost." It was somewhat critical of the cast, particularly Grant Richards who "plays the lead and conveys the suggestion that acting isn't easy."
