= Norman Alden =

American actor (1924–2012)

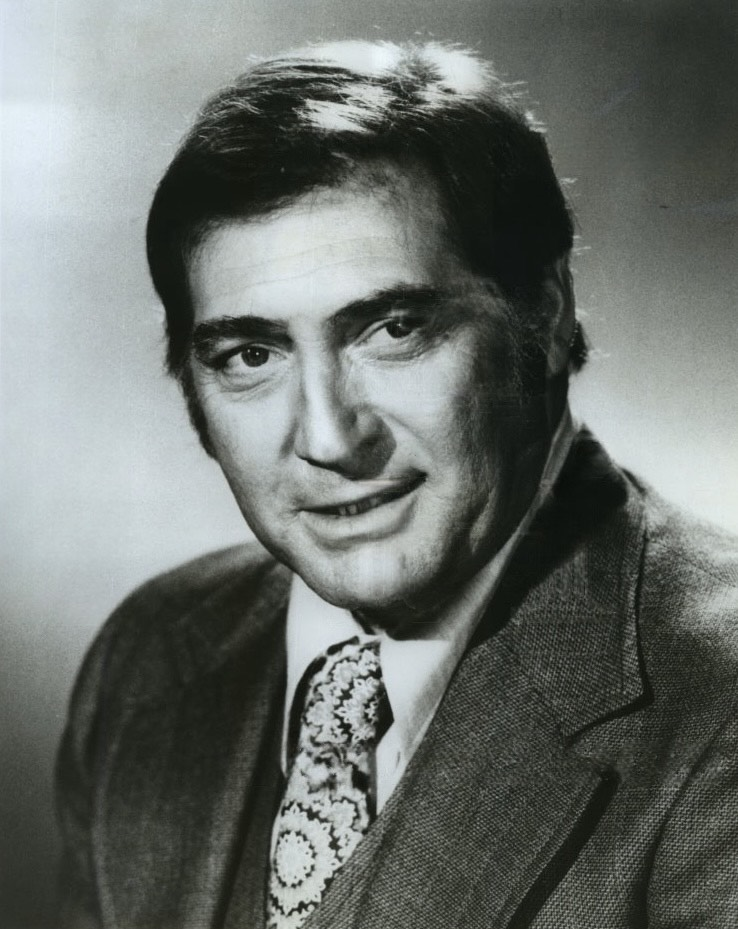
- Alden in 1976
- Born: Norman Adelberg; September 13, 1924; Fort Worth, Texas, U.S.
- Died: July 27, 2012 (aged 87); Los Angeles, California, U.S.
- Resting place: Hollywood Forever Cemetery
- Other name: Norm Alden
- Education: Texas Christian University
- Occupation: Actor
- Years active: 1957–2006
- Spouse: Sharon Hayden (m. 1966; div. 1978)
- Children: Brent Alden & Ashley Alden

Norman Alden (né Adelberg; September 13, 1924 – July 27, 2012) was an American character actor who performed in television programs and motion pictures. He first appeared on television on The 20th Century Fox Hour in 1957. He provided the voices of Sir Kay in The Sword in the Stone (1963) and Kranix in The Transformers: The Movie (1986), and had a notable role in I Never Promised You a Rose Garden (1977). His acting career began in 1957 and lasted nearly 50 years.

== Background ==
Alden was born in Fort Worth, Texas, the son of Jewish parents Benjamin Adelberg and Esther (née Covinsky). He served in the United States Army during World War II and returned to Fort Worth to attend Texas Christian University under the GI Bill of Rights. Some of his acting ability was developed while at TCU with participation in the on-campus theater. He had two children.

== Career ==
Alden appeared in dozens of television series in the 1950s and 1960s. In 1958, he guest-starred in an episode of the CBS situation comedy Mr. Adams and Eve. He was cast in three episodes in 1958 and 1959 of ABC's The Adventures of Rin Tin Tin. He was cast in six guest-starring roles between 1959 and 1962, mostly as Seaman Pulaski, on Jackie Cooper's CBS sitcom/drama, Hennesey. In 1959 and 1960, he was cast as Corporal Lucius Grundy in fifteen episodes of the series Not for Hire. From 1959 to 1961, he appeared as different characters in nine episodes of the NBC crime drama, The Lawless Years. In 1961, he portrayed Shad Welty in the episode "Ordeal at Dead Tree" of the ABC/Warner Brothers Western series, Bronco, starring Ty Hardin. Also in 1961, he appeared in the episode "The Four" with Jack Elam in the Western series, Lawman, starring John Russell. He guest starred as well on the 1960–1962 CBS sitcom, Pete and Gladys and in a 1964 episode of the CBS sitcom The Cara Williams Show. In 1966, he also played The Joker's Henchman #1 in episodes 25 and 26, titled "The Joker Trumps an Ace" and "Batman Sets the Pace", of Batman. In 1970–71, he played Tom Williams on My Three Sons. He played Sergeant Krebs in 1966 in the Hogan's Heroes episode "Happiness Is a Warm Sergeant". In 1967, he portrayed Captain Horton in the ABC sitcom Rango. In 1970, he appeared in an episode of The Silent Force. He had a small part in an Adam-12 episode on October 3, 1973. Alden played the police captain in the 1988 NBC TV movie Man Against the Mob starring George Peppard.

Alden portrayed Johnny Ringo in the 1955 Western series, The Life and Legend of Wyatt Earp, with Hugh O'Brian in the title role. Alden also played in Barnaby Jones in the December 31, 1974, episode "The Last Contract". Alden played Coach Leroy Fedder in the 1970s television series, Mary Hartman, Mary Hartman. He also voiced the ringmaster, Hank, on the animated television series Devlin. He played the lead in the film Andy. The actor also played a former cop bent on getting his revenge against Steve McGarrett in the Season 4 Hawaii Five-O episode "Rest in Peace, Somebody".

Other roles that Alden portrayed included the AC Delco repairman, Lou the Mechanic, for seven years in a series of advertisements; Professor Frank Heflin in Electra Woman and Dyna Girl; Aquaman, Green Arrow and Plastic Man in the animated TV franchise Super Friends; two episodes of The Andy Griffith Show; and Major Truman Landon in Tora! Tora! Tora! (1970). He provided the voice of Sir Kay in the 1963 Disney film The Sword in the Stone, and Kranix in the 1986 film The Transformers: The Movie. In 1976, Alden appeared as Big Daddy Dawson, Flo's first ex-husband on the CBS TV series, Alice. He was in one episode of Dallas as Senator William Orloff in Season 1 Episode 3 "Spy in the House" aka Mini Series. In Season 1 of The Dukes of Hazzard, he played Chief Lacey of the Springville Police in the episode "Deputy Dukes"; he returned to the role in the second-season episode "The Ghost of General Lee". He appeared as Lou Caruthers, the owner of the coffee shop in Back to the Future (1985) and the color-blind cameraman Bill in Tim Burton's Ed Wood (1994). He appeared in Kansas City Bomber (1972), which starred Raquel Welch.

In 1986, Alden arrived to the taping of the television program Small Wonder, not realizing that the episode had been co-written by his cousin Jack Gross.

== Death ==
Alden retired from acting in 2006. He died of natural causes at age 87 on July 27, 2012, in Los Angeles. He is interred at Hollywood Forever Cemetery.

== Filmography ==
- Hear Me Good (1957) as Master of Ceremonies
- The Power of the Resurrection (1958) as Gate Guard
- The Walking Target (1960) as Sam Russo
- Operation Bottleneck (1961) as Cpl. Lester 'Merc' Davenport
- Portrait of a Mobster (1961) as Bo Wetzel
- Secret of Deep Harbor (1961) as Barney Haines
- The Nutty Professor (1963) as Football Player / Student
- The Sword in the Stone (1963) as Sir Kay (voice)
- Man's Favorite Sport? (1964) as John Screaming Eagle
- Bedtime Story (1964) as Dubin
- The Patsy (1964) as Bully at the Gym
- Andy (1965) as Andy Chadakis
- Red Line 7000 (1965) as Pat
- The Wild Angels (1966) as Medic
- First to Fight (1967) as Sgt. Schmidtmer
- Good Times (1967) as Warren
- Chubasco (1968) as Frenchy
- Fever Heat (1968) as Herbert Herpgruve
- The Devil's Brigade (1968) as MP Lieutenant
- Killers Three (1968) as Guthrie
- Listen to the Man (1969)
- Changes (1969) as Jump Rope
- All the Loving Couples (1969) as Mitch Burnett
- The Great Bank Robbery (1969) as The Great Gregory - Balloonist
- Tora! Tora! Tora! (1970) as Major Truman Landon
- Hawaii Five-O (1971, TV Series Episode: Rest in Peace Somebody) as Cannon
- Stand Up and Be Counted (1972) as Businessman
- Ben (1972) as Policeman
- Where Does It Hurt? (1972) as Katzen
- Kansas City Bomber (1972) as Horrible Hank Hopkins
- MIssion Impossible (1972, TV Series Episode: Double Dead) as George Collins
- Everything You Always Wanted to Know About Sex (1972) as Brain Technician
- Blood, Black and White (1973)
- Chopper One (1974, TV Episode "Killing Time") as Fleck
- Planet Of The Apes (1974, TV Series) as Zako
- The Hindenburg (1975) as Detective Baker, N.Y.P.D.
- I Never Promised You a Rose Garden (1977) as McPherson
- Semi-Tough (1977) as Coach Alvin Parks
- Cloud Dancer (1980) as Dr. Putnam
- Borderline (1980) as Willie Lambert
- Victor/Victoria (1982) as Man in Hotel with Shoes
- Back to the Future (1985) as Lou Caruthers
- The Transformers: The Movie (1986) as Kranix (voice)
- Off the Mark (1987) as Coach Elam
- They Live (1988) as Foreman
- Cutting Class (1989) as Officer Fondulac
- Roller Blade Warriors: Taken by Force (1989) as Bartender
- Ed Wood (1994) as Cameraman Bill
- Patch Adams (1998) as Truck Driver
- K-PAX (2001) as Babbling Man
