= Guns, Girls and Gangsters =

1959 American crime drama directed by Edward L. Cahn

- Directed by: Edward L. Cahn
- Written by: Paul Gangelin; Jerry Sackheim; Robert E. Kent
- Produced by: Robert E. Kent; Edward Small (executive)
- Starring: Mamie Van Doren; Gerald Mohr; Lee Van Cleef; Grant Richards
- Cinematography: Kenneth Peach
- Edited by: Fred R. Feitshans Jr.
- Music by: Buddy Bregman
- Production companies: Edward Small Productions; Spinel Entertainment
- Distributed by: United Artists
- Release date: January 1959
- Running time: 70 minutes
- Country: United States
- Language: English

Guns, Girls and Gangsters is a 1959 American film noir crime film directed by Edward L. Cahn and starring Mamie Van Doren, Gerald Mohr, Lee Van Cleef, and Grant Richards. It was written by Paul Gangelin, Jerry Sackheim and Robert E. Kent.

== Plot ==
Chuck Wheeler is released from prison and plans an elaborate heist of an armored truck carrying money from a Las Vegas casino. Chuck enlists the help of nightclub owner Joe Darren as well as Vi Victor, a sensational blonde married to Chuck's ex-cellmate Mike Bennett. Mike is a very jealous and dangerous man who will not grant Vi a divorce. He escapes from prison just before the armored truck robbery is to occur and causes havoc when he locates Chuck, Joe, and his unfaithful wife.

== Cast ==
- Mamie Van Doren as Vi Victor
- Gerald Mohr as Chuck Wheeler
- Lee Van Cleef as Mike Bennett
- Grant Richards as Joe Darren
- Elaine Edwards as Ann Thomas
- John Baer as Steve Thomas
- Paul Fix as Lou Largo

== Production ==
Robert E. Kent produced the film for Edward Small. Filming commenced in April 1958.

== Reception ==
The Monthly Film Bulletin wrote: "The title accurately suggests the moronic tough-guy dialogue, the hard-boiled, hard-faced hoodlums with their slick violence, and the cheap and nasty after-taste left by the whole film."

The Hollywood Reporter wrote: "Kent's screenplay, from a well worked out story by Paul Gangelin and Jerome Sackheim, is taut with suspense and has smoother construction than is found in most low-budget pictures. There are enough plot twists to keep the spectator guessing and some good flashes of characterization."

Variety wrote: "Film unfolds in a semi-documentary vein that, had it been carried to its fullest, could have resulted in greater quality ... Direction by Edward L. Cahn fails to bring a professional performance from Miss Van Doren, and Mohr seems entirely too smooth."

== See also ==
- List of American films of 1959

== Bibliography ==
Barry Lowe; Mamie Van Doren (2008). Atomic Blonde: The Films of Mamie Van Doren. McFarland. pp. 135–139. ISBN 978-0-7864-3138-0. (credits, film synopsis).
