= Secret of Deep Harbor =

1961 film by Edward L. Cahn

- Original lobby card with Merry Anders and Ron Foster
- Directed by: Edward L. Cahn
- Written by: Owen Harris; Wells Root
- Based on: novel by Max Miller
- Produced by: Edward Small (executive); Robert E. Kent
- Starring: Ron Foster; Merry Anders
- Cinematography: Gilbert Warrenton
- Edited by: Kenneth G. Crane
- Music by: Richard LaSalle
- Production company: Harvard Film Corporation
- Distributed by: United Artists
- Release date: October 25, 1961
- Running time: 70 minutes
- Country: United States
- Language: English

The Secret of Deep Harbor is a 1961 film directed by Edward L. Cahn, and starring Ron Foster and Merry Anders.

It was a remake by producer Edward Small of his earlier I Cover the Waterfront (1932).

== Plot ==
Reporter Skip Hanlon (Ron Foster) is stuck in Deep Harbor, a bit frustrated about nothing happening there and stalled in his "career". He meets Janey Fowler (Merry Anders), whose father Milo (Barry Kelley) is the captain of a charter boat. The "syndicate" pays the captain to transport gangsters out of the U.S.. Then the mobster on Milo´s boat coldbloodedly kills one of his escape-passengers because he tricked the syndicate. The body is then thrown over board with an anchor chained around the legs. Hanlon´s best friend Barney (Norman Alden) has a salvage service and finds the anchor tied to the dead man, Frank Miner. Whereas Skip and Janey develop a relation she identifies the anchor as being Milo´s and thus Skip gets his scoop that brings him national attention and the contempt of Janey who feels betrayed. Milo can escape the arrest by the police and asks Janey to help him to flee to Mexico. Wounded by a shot he hides in a warehouse when Skip sees him. Milo shoots at him in a father/son-in-law-to-be-encounter but then dies after fainting Skip asked Janey to marry him.

== Cast ==
- Ron Foster as Skip Hanlon
- Barry Kelley as Milo Fowler
- Merry Anders as Janey Fowler
- Norman Alden as Barney Hanes
- James Seay as Travis
- Grant Richards as Rick Correll
- Ralph Manza as Frank Miner
- Billie Bird as Mama Miller
- Elaine Walker as Rita
- Max Mellinger as Doctor

== See also ==
- List of American films of 1961
