= Cage of Evil =

1960 film

- Directed by: Edward L. Cahn
- Screenplay by: Orville H. Hampton
- Based on: story by Orville H. Hampton and Alexander Richards
- Produced by: Edward Small (executive); Robert E. Kent
- Starring: Ron Foster; Patricia Blair; Harp McGuire
- Cinematography: Maury Gertsman
- Edited by: Michael Minth (as Michael J. Minth); Grant Whytock
- Music by: Paul Sawtell; Bert Shefter
- Production company: Robert E. Kent Productions (as Zenith Pictures)
- Distributed by: United Artists
- Release date: July 1960 (US)
- Running time: 70 mins
- Country: USA
- Language: English

Cage of Evil is a low-budget 1960 American crime film directed by Edward L. Cahn and starring Ron Foster and Patricia Blair. It was written by Orville H. Hampton.

== Plot ==
Scott Harper is a frustrated police detective who is constantly passed over for promotion. When he is assigned to gain the confidence of Holly, the girlfriend of a robbery suspect, the couple fall in love and then plot to murder Holly's boyfriend and run off to Mexico with the loot.

== Cast ==
- Ronald Foster as Scott Harper
- Patricia Blair as Holly Taylor (billed as Pat Blair)
- Harp McGuire as Murray Kearns
- John Maxwell as Don Melrose
- Preston Hanson as Tom Colton
- Doug Henderson as Barney
- Hugh Sanders as Martin Bender
- Helen Kleeb as Mrs. Melton
- Robert Shayne as Victor Delmar
- Owen Bush as Sgt. Ray Dean
- Ted Knight as Dan Ivers
- Howard McLeod as Kurt Romack

== Reception ==
In a contemporary review for the New York Daily News, critic Maxine Dowling called Cage of Evil "a bitter and contrived tale... It's an uninteresting, slowly paced melodrama that does nothing for anyone concerned, least of all our much maligned police."

The New York Post commented that "performances are better than fair," and that the film "is a shoot-it-out opus with little surprise. The audience knows from the beginning that detective Ron Foster is unhappy with his lot. Much work, no promotion. We wait for him, on the trail of a diamond thief, to go over to the other side. This he does, not only because he envies the spoils, but because he has fallen for the crook's moll, Pat Blair. They get theirs!"

TV Guide wrote that "it's not bad for grade-B crime drama."

== TV showings ==
It was shown on the Turner Classic Movies show Noir Alley with Eddie Muller on October 22, 2022.

== See also ==
- List of American films of 1960
