= The Music Box Kid =

1960 film by Edward L. Cahn

- Directed by: Edward L. Cahn
- Written by: Herbert Abbott Spiro
- Produced by: Edward Small (executive); Robert E. Kent
- Starring: Ron Foster; Luana Patten
- Cinematography: Maury Gertsman
- Edited by: James Blakeley; Grant Whytock
- Music by: Paul Sawtell; Bert Shefter
- Production company: Premium Pictures
- Distributed by: United Artists (U.S.)
- Release date: May 25, 1960
- Running time: 75 minutes
- Country: United States
- Language: English

The Music Box Kid is a low budget 1960 gangster film directed by Edward L. Cahn, starring Ron Foster and Luana Patten.

== Plot ==
Set in 1920s New York, this story begins with Larry Shaw and Margaret Shaw having a housewarming party, where they meet Father Gorman as Larry is leaving to take care of business for Chesty Miller. Larry decides after finishing the job for Chesty that he has bigger plans in his future and demands a raise. Chesty decides to put Larry on the D and E (Discipline and Execute) squad to scare his rival Biggie Gaines, Larry finds this not suited to his goals and knocks out Bo, Chesty's enforcer and head of the D and E, Chesty after this makes Larry head of the D and E squad and gives him a machine gun also known as a music box. Larry begins his reign by terrorizing the streets of New York; this makes Chesty unhappy as his activities are being noticed by the media and the public is beginning to have a negative view of his gang until his rival "The Bug" calls and tells Chesty he will stay out of his way because he doesn't like the sound of that music box, earning Larry the nickname The Music Box Kid.

After a short narration on the Prohibition, Larry is seen by a witness and is called in to see the District Attorney. Chesty provides Larry with a lawyer and this allows Larry to get away with no proof of his involvement as the witness says he can't be sure. Father Gorman, after hearing about the gang activity in the newspapers, goes to check on Margaret Shaw concerned with her well-being, as he suspects her husband Larry of being a gangster. Margaret learns that her husband is a gangster and that is why they can afford their lifestyle; she becomes terrified for her life. Later that night Larry calls a meeting of his most trusted accomplices and forms the Larry Shaw Enterprises gang, all while Margaret is listening in the kitchen. Larry's first business deal is with his former boss Chesty; he pitches a contract deal which would leave Chesty's gang blameless. Larry's gang becomes successful in dealing contracts to each of the gangs and as Larry becomes delirious with the power he kidnaps Biggie Gaines' right-hand man Pat Lamont and asks for a ransom. Tension increases as Larry and his gang continue to hit the other gangs where it hurts and at the same time tension between Larry and Margaret increase as Father Gorman tries to convince Margaret to tell everything she knows about Larry and his gang to George Gordon, the new chief hired to catch Larry and the other gangsters. Margaret refuses then later overhears Larry's plan to kill George Gordon and offer it as a contract to all the gang leaders for $1 million. Margaret, thinking of her unborn child, calls Father Gorman after Larry and his gang leave and relays the plan to Father Gorman. The next scene Larry is killed by a policeman in the scuffle and the film ends showing the fate of Margaret and Larry's son, who chose to become a Priest.

== Cast ==
- Larry Shaw - Ron Foster
- Margaret Shaw - Luana Patten
- Chesty Miller - Grant Richards
- Tony Maldano - Johnny Seven
- Pat Lamont - Carl Milletaire
- Father Gorman - Dayton Lummis
- Biggie Gaines - Bernard Fein
- Bo - Baynes Barron (Uncredited)
- George Gordon - Carlton Young (Uncredited)

== Critical reception ==
TV Guide wrote, "this is a formula gangster flick, with clichéd situations and stereotyped characters. The direction is efficient, however, giving some polish to an otherwise standard piece. The cast gives the film a little soul as well with some spirited performances."

== See also ==
- List of American films of 1960
