= The Walking Target =

1960 film by Edward L. Cahn

- Directed by: Edward L. Cahn
- Written by: Stephen Kandel
- Produced by: Edward Small (executive); Robert E. Kent
- Starring: Joan Evans; Merry Anders; Ronald Foster
- Cinematography: Maury Gertsman
- Edited by: Charles Seel; Grant Whytock
- Music by: Paul Sawtell; Bert Shefter
- Production company: Robert E. Kent Productions (as Zenith Pictures)
- Distributed by: United Artists
- Release date: October 1960
- Running time: 74 minutes
- Country: United States
- Language: English

The Walking Target is a 1960 crime film directed by Edward L. Cahn and starring Joan Evans, Merry Anders, and Ronald Foster. The screenplay concerns an ex-con who, upon release from prison, sets out to retrieve the $260,000 he hid before he was arrested, and finds unexpected romance with the widow of his former partner in crime.

== Plot ==
As Nick Harbin prepares for his release from prison after serving five years for a payroll heist, he refuses to disclose the location of the $260,000 he stole with two accomplices, who are now dead. Upon release, Nick is immediately confronted by reporters, police, and his ex-girlfriend Sue, who appears eager to rekindle their relationship.

Sue and Nick drive to his old house, followed closely by the police, where they encounter Dave, another old acquaintance. Sue and Dave's suspicious enthusiasm about the money soon reveals their true motives—they are now a couple, working for Arnie Hoffman, a local gangster, to recover the stolen cash.

Eluding the police, Nick makes his way to the home of Sammy Russo, one of his deceased partners, only to find it abandoned. A vagrant living in the garage directs him to a small town in Arizona, where he discovers Gail, Sammy's widow and Nick's former love, working in her family's restaurant. Though initially cold towards Nick, Gail gradually sees the changes in him after his time in prison. Exhausted by the constant pursuit, Nick offers Gail the entire stolen sum, desiring only a peaceful life. Together, they retrieve the money hidden in the frame of Gail's car and plan to surrender it to the authorities the next morning.

However, Dave, Hoffman, and their enforcer arrive, threatening Gail to coerce Nick into handing over the money. Just as the situation escalates, the police arrive in time to defuse the confrontation. Nick reveals the money's location to the authorities and then shares a heartfelt embrace with Gail.

== Cast ==
- Joan Evans as Gail Russo
- Ronald Foster as Nick Harbin
- Merry Anders as Susan
- Harp McGuire as Max Brodney
- Robert Christopher as Dave
- Berry Kroeger as Hoffman
- Bill Couch as Thug
- Norman Alden as Russo
- James Callahan as Al Kramer
