= Jacklyn O'Donnell =

American actress (born 1941)

- Born: Jacklyn Pearl O'Donnell; January 20, 1941 (age 85); Los Angeles, California, U.S.
- Other name: Erin O'Donnell
- Education: Hollywood Professional School
- Occupation: Actress
- Years active: 1956–1970

Jacklyn Pearl O'Donnell (born January 20, 1941) is a retired American actress who was active from 1956 until 1970. She had regular starring roles on two television series, and performed on stage and in films. From September 1961 on she used the name "Erin O'Donnell" for billing credits.

== Early life ==
She was born Jacklyn Pearl O'Donnell in Los Angeles, California on January 20, 1941, to Jack and Aurine Hayes O'Donnell. She had one older brother. She was reared by her maternal grandparents who started her on piano and ballet lessons at age five. She completed her elementary education in Inglewood, California, then transferred to the Hollywood Professional School, from which she graduated in 1957 at age 16.

While still in school she had performed in a piano duo called the Duoettes with Anna Fagerlin. They played both popular and classical selections for Women's Social Clubs. She also began acting at age 15, having a major role in a professional stage production, A Room Full of Roses. The Los Angeles Times drama critic called her performance as a troubled teenager "wonderful" though a later article indicates her stage debut was as an unpaid apprentice.

== Early career ==
Still a senior in high school, O'Donnell signed with the Jeanne Halliburton talent agency, which advertised her for ingenue parts in casting directories. She had parts in five television episodes during 1957, two of them for the anthology series Matinee Theater, as well as Father Knows Best, The Life of Riley, and Bachelor Father.

During March 1958 she did her second stage performance, a feature role in A Man Called Peter.

== The Ed Wynn Show ==
O'Donnell was placed under contract to Thalia-Keethwyn Productions in May 1958 for a television show scheduled that Fall. The Ed Wynn Show would be the third television series for the veteran comic actor Ed Wynn. O'Donnell and Sherry Alberoni would play Wynn's granddaughters. O'Donnell drew lots of publicity during the fall of 1958 for this show, in which she played a college student living at home. Despite an engaging cast, which included Herb Vigran and Myrna Fahey, the show lasted for only fifteen episodes. NBC cancelled it and moved Steve Canyon to its time slot in early January 1959.

== Film and television ==
For 1959 O'Donnell did two anthology series on television, Goodyear Theatre and The DuPont Show. She also starred in her first film, an independently produced thirty-minute short called Teenage Challenge. The director of this short, William F. Claxton, would also direct O'Donnell's first feature-length film Young Jesse James, shot in 1959 but not released until August 1960. After completing her work in this film, O'Donnell flew to Phoenix, Arizona for a supporting role in The Late Christopher Bean.

Most of 1960 was disappointing for O'Donnell. She had only one television performance, on Zane Grey Theatre, and when Young Jesse James was released in August the New York Times reviewer described her as "drab". However, things picked up towards the end of the year when she was cast in a new television series.

== Westinghouse Playhouse ==
NBC bought a thirty-minute television program from Revue Studios for broadcast on Friday nights starting in January 1961. The show, called Westinghouse Playhouse, was not an anthology series as the name might suggest, but a sitcom loosely based on events in the real family life of star Nanette Fabray. O'Donnell was cast as Fabray's new seventeen year old step-daughter, who initially resents her father's (Wendell Corey) remarriage. The show also featured Bobby Diamond and Doris Kemper, and late in the series, Mimi Gibson.

O'Donnell appeared in all twenty-six episodes of the series; a few of them were based around her character. However, within a few weeks the series was already being called Nanette Fabray or The Fabray Show in acknowledgement of the overwhelming presence of the energetic star.

Though the cast was considered good by critics, the show's writing "depended on developments which were easily foreseen and completely predictable". The show was not renewed by NBC and aired its final episode in early July 1961. The cancellation precipitated a major change in O'Donnell's career.

== Later career ==
At age twenty, O'Donnell decided to change her agents and her billing name. She left Halliburton for the Herman Zimmerman agency, and by September 1961 was billed as "Erin O'Donnell". Having foregone accumulated name recognition, she found 1962 a slow year. She had two films, a light comedy Saintly Sinners, and Incident in an Alley, a noir drama based on a Rod Serling story. Both movies had been filmed in 1961. She also did one television show that year.

The following year (1963) saw her starting to break out of teenage typecasting, as she played more mature roles on four narrative dramas: Perry Mason, Arrest and Trial, and two episodes of Ben Casey. She also did a week-long run on stage in Just for Tonight, which starred Gloria Swanson. By 1964 she had lost the babyface look that spelled "teenager" to casting directors, and was graduated from ingenue status to leading woman. That year she had performances on six different television shows, including Temple Houston, The Danny Thomas Show, and Wendy and Me.

She had work on three television series for 1965: Mister Roberts, My Brother the Angel, and two episodes of Bonanza. However, she did only one dramatic television series in 1967, and by 1970 finished out her performing career with a minor part in a mixed genre film, Hell's Bloody Devils.

== Oldsmobile commercials ==
Starting in fall 1966 O'Donnell featured in TV commercials for 1967 Oldsmobile cars. The commercials were popular and landed her at least one talk show appearance. O'Donnell told one interviewer they generated more publicity for her than anything in her dramatic career. She was reported to be in negotiation with a movie studio as a result. An apocryphal rumor was circulated by newspaper columnist Walter Winchell that she had spent the money earned from the commercials on a Ford automobile.

== Personal life ==
At seventeen, O'Donnell was described as being 5 ft 2 in (157 cm), 105 pounds (48 kg), with "brown eyes and honey-blond hair".

O'Donnell gave an interview in 1967 to beauty columnist Lydia Lane in which she mentioned having attended college where she experienced a broken romance. No other details about her personal life as an adult are available; she seems to have escaped attention from gossip columnists and fan magazines.

== Stage performances ==
Listed by year of first performance (excluding student productions)
Year	Play	Role	Venue	Notes
1956	A Roomful of Roses	Bridget MacGowan	Call Board Theater	O'Donnell starred in this original play by Edith Sommer.
1958	A Man Called Peter	Susan	Call Board Theater	Dramatized by John McGreedey from book by Catherine Marshall.
1960	The Late Christopher Bean	Susan Haggett	Sombrero Playhouse	O'Donnell supported Don Beddoe and Shirley Booth for the one-week run.
1963	Just For Tonight	Caroline Stanley	Sombrero Playhouse	Written for Gloria Swanson by Harold J. Kennedy, who also directed and starred in it with her.

== Filmography ==
Film (by year of first release)
Year	Title	Role	Notes
1959 (Note: Some sources list the release year as 1958, but the film itself carries a 1959 copyright)	Teenage Challenge	Betty Hayes	Independently produced short film with Christian theme
1960	Young Jesse James	Zerelda "Zee" Mimms	
1962	Incident in an Alley (Note: The working title was Line of Duty)	Jean Joddy	Her first film credit as "Erin O'Donnell".
1962	Saintly Sinners	Sue Braeden	
1970	Hell's Bloody Devils	Leni Marvenga	Ads labelled her and other actresses as "The Wild Rebellion Girls".

Television (in original broadcast order, excluding commercials)
Year	Series	Episode	Role	Notes
1957	Father Knows Best	(Unknown episode)		Known only from later newspaper articles
1957	The Life of Riley	A Young Man's Fancy	Joan	
1957	Matinee Theater	(2 Unknown Episodes)		Known only from later newspaper articles
1957	Bachelor Father	Uncle Bentley Keeps His Promise	Girl #2	
1958	The Ed Wynn Show	Sincerely, Sam Hill	Laurie	
1958	The Ed Wynn Show	The Crossing Guard	Laurie	
1958	The Ed Wynn Show	The Scholarship	Laurie	This episode aired the same night (Oct 9th) as....
1958	The Real McCoys	Grampa Learns about Teenagers	Gloria	....this episode filmed earlier in the summer.
1958	The Ed Wynn Show	(11 Episodes)	Laurie	
1959	The Ed Wynn Show	New York Adventure	Laurie	Final episode of this series
1959	Goodyear Theatre	A Light in the Fruit Closet	Betsy	Sequel to Mr. Blandings Builds His Dream House.
1959	The DuPont Show	Love Is a Headache	Hannah	
1960	Zane Grey Theatre	The Ox	Nancy McConnell	O'Donnell is pawn between Whit Bissell and Burl Ives.
1961	Westinghouse Playhouse	(26 Episodes)	Nancy McGovern	Her second stint as a series regular, and her last credit under her birth name.
1962	The Gertrude Berg Show	High Finance	Marion	Her first TV credit as "Erin O'Donnell"
1963	Ben Casey	A Short Bio... (Note: The full title of the episode is "A Short Biographical Sketch of James Tuttle Peabody, M.D.". There was a penchant for long episode titles among teleplay writers starting in the mid-1960s.)	Miss Warner	
1963	Ben Casey	Justice to a Microbe	Agnes	
1963	Perry Mason	The Case of the Reluctant Model	Maxine Lindsay	O'Donnell is the defendant.
1963	Arrest and Trial	Inquest into a Bleeding Heart	Miss Claxton	
1964	Kraft Suspense Theatre	Who Is Jennifer?	Farm Girl	
1964	Temple Houston	The Case for William Gotch	Laura Jean	
1964	My Favorite Martian	Who Am I?	Coed	
1964	The Danny Thomas Show	Rusty and the Chorus Girl	Wendy	
1964	This Is the Life	The Trap of Freedom	Maxine	
1964	Wendy and Me	Wendy's Secret Wedding	Laura	Airline stewardess (O'Donnell) has secret wedding.
1965	Bonanza	A Good Night's Rest	Peggy	
1965	Bonanza	Jonah	Susan	
1965	Mister Roberts	Carry Me Back to Cocoa Island		O'Donnell and Joy Harmon guest starred.
1965	My Brother the Angel	Here Comes the Bridegroom	Arlene	
1967	The Gypsy Rose Lee Show	Episode of 1967-03-20	Herself	O'Donnell played two Chopin études.
1967	The High Chaparral	Destination Tucson	Jo	
