= Fabares =

Fabares is a surname. Notable people with the surname include:

- Nanette Fabares (1920–2018), American actress, singer, and dancer
- Shelley Fabares (1944–2026), American actress and singer
