= Le Jongleur de Notre Dame (short story) =

Le Jongleur de Notre Dame is a religious miracle story by the French author Anatole France, first printed in a newspaper in 1890, and published in a short story collection in 1892. It is based on a medieval poem, Our Lady's Tumbler, similar to the later Christmas carol The Little Drummer Boy.

== Plot ==
The title character is a monk who was formerly a carnival performer. The other monks all have made beautiful works in honor of the Virgin Mary: hymns, icons, stained glass windows, and so on. But he has no such craft. So one night he goes into the chapel and performs his best juggling tricks before the statue of the Virgin and collapses from exhaustion. The other monks see this and would punish him for blasphemy, but the statue comes to life and blesses the juggler for his gift.

== Adaptations of the story ==
=== Books ===
- THE LITTLE JUGGLER and Other French Tales Retold (1917), by children's author and illustrator Violet Moore Higgins
- The Juggler of Our Lady (1957), by cartoonist R.O. Blechman
- The Little Juggler (1961), by American children's author and illustrator Barbara Cooney
- The Clown of God (1974), picture book by children's author and illustrator Tomie dePaola

In 1980, an anthology of science fiction stories titled The Best of All Possible Worlds for Ace Books featured five of Spider Robinson's favorite stories by select authors, together with a favorite story recommended by each of those authors. Mr. Robinson contributed a self-translated version of the story, titled "Our Lady's Juggler," in response to learning that the story was Robert A. Heinlein's favorite short story of all time.

=== Film and television ===
- The Greatest Gift (1942), a short subject with Edmund Gwenn as the juggler Bartholomé and Hans Conried as one of the other monks
- The Juggler of Our Lady (1958), an animated Terrytoons short based on the Blechman adaptation, narrated by Boris Karloff, which was nominated for a BAFTA award
- "The Young Juggler" (1960), Episode 26 of Startime, produced by and starring Tony Curtis
- "Christmas Stories: The Little Juggler" (1968), Episode 645 of the British television series Jackanory
- The Juggler of Notre Dame (also Magic Legend of the Juggler, and Legend of the Juggler) (1970), an obscure, low budget, feature-length film starring Barry Dennen in the title role, and featuring such actors as Walter Slezak, Willoughby Goddard, and Joe E. Ross
- The Juggler of Notre Dame (1982), an Americanized, modernized adaptation of the story, filmed for television in color, starring Carl Carlsson, a real juggler, as Barnaby, Eugene Roche as the Prior, Father Delany, and Merlin Olsen and Melinda Dillon as additional characters created for this version

=== Radio ===
- "Joppe the Juggler" (1950), an episode of Family Theater, broadcast during the Christmas season, starring Wallace Ford as the juggler, with opening and closing remarks by Spencer Tracy

During the Golden Age of Radio, the story was broadcast several times, usually under the title "The Juggler of Our Lady", and nearly always on the then-popular radio series Family Theater. Screen Guild Theatre broadcast a version in 1940 narrated by Ronald Colman, with songs provided by Nelson Eddy.

=== Other media ===
- Le jongleur de Notre-Dame (1902), an opera by Jules Massenet
- "The Juggler of Our Lady" (1965), a 30-minute dance/movement theater piece by American choreographer and dancer Flower Hujer and artist and choreographer Miller Richardson, performed by a cast of twenty dancers, mostly in churches, with several revivals for the next 25 years. Hujer herself performed the role of the figure of the Virgin Mary brought to life. It was filmed and telecast on the program "Lamp Unto My Feet", on WCBS-TV, New York, May 2, 1965.
- "Barnaby the Juggler" (2003), spoken by Andy Griffith on his Christmas/Gospel album, The Christmas Guest.
