= Miller Richardson =

American costume designer, and artist (1917–2012)

- Born: El Paso, Texas
- Died: Staten Island, New York
- Occupations: Visual artist, stage and costume designer, scenographer, choreographer
- Years active: 1953 - 2007
- Partner: Flower Hujer

Miller Richardson (1917 – May 25, 2012) was an American visual artist, stage and costume designer, scenographer and modern dance choreographer best known for his collaborations with Flower Hujer in the Flower Hujer Dance Theater company.

== Life and career ==
William Miller Richardson, known professionally as Miller Richardson, was born in El Paso, Texas. He studied architecture at the Georgia Institute of Technology. At 19 he was awarded a scholarship to study art at the Art Students League under William Charles McNulty. He also studied at the Museum of Design Atlanta during 1938.

In 1953 he met choreographer and dancer Flower Hujer, who is described in his obituary as his "longtime companion". In 1975 they bought a neo-Gothic house together in New Brighton, Pendleton Place, which he restored. According to the New York Times: "His garden is exquisite, with shaped fir trees that give it an Italian air." They lived there the rest of their lives. He collaborated with Hujer as artistic director of the Flower Hujer Dance Theatre, where he worked on choreography, costume and lighting design and sometimes performed. Richardson and Hujer were known for their exotic costumes and creative choreography. In 1984 he did a demonstration of costume design at Lincoln Center. Their dances, based on religious and nature themes and praised for their dignity and simplicity, were presented in Trinity Wall Street, St. Bartholomew's, Church of the Intercession (Manhattan), Choreospace and other venues. Their best known piece was "The Juggler of Our Lady", based on a medieval legend turned into a story by Anatole France. It was broadcast on television in 1965, performed in Kennebunk, Maine, in 1967, and had revivals in 1981, 1988 and 1990.

Richardson worked as a multi-media artist. In addition to working in the theater, painting settings, backdrops and decor, he also executed commissions like portraits, murals, and decorative projects. He did not retire until he was nearly 90.
