= The Ed Wynn Show (1958 TV series) =

1958 American sitcom

- Genre: Sitcom
- Starring: Ed Wynn; Jacklyn O'Donnell; Sherry Alberoni; Herb Vigran
- Theme music composer: George Hormel
- Opening theme: "Light Main Title"
- Country of origin: United States
- No. of seasons: 1
- No. of episodes: 15

Production
- Producers: Ben Feiner, Jr
- Cinematography: Fred Jackman
- Editor: Edwin Bryant
- Running time: 30 minutes

Original release
- Network: NBC
- Release: September 25, 1958 – January 1, 1959

The Ed Wynn Show is a filmed sitcom that aired Thursday evenings on NBC from September 25, 1958 to January 1, 1959. It was the second TV show of the same name for the veteran comedian Ed Wynn, and his third television series overall. The Thalia-Keethwyn production company, of which he and his son Keenan Wynn were part-owners, worked with Screen Gems to make the show.

== Premise ==
John Beamer (Ed Wynn) is a retired taxidermist in a small college town. He is a widower who lives in a big old house with his two granddaughters. The elder, Laurie (Jacklyn O'Donnell), attends the local college, while Midge (Sherry Alberoni) is a school girl. Their mother is dead, their father is mentioned as working overseas. Advance publicity described Beamer as a "wily old widower with a genius for solving other people's problems". Beamer's attorney and friend, Ernest Hinshaw (Herb Vigran), is the only other regular character. Recurring characters include Pauline (Myrna Fahey), a college friend of Laurie, and Mrs. Creavy (Jesslyn Fax), a gossipy neighbor.

== Production ==
The first public notice of the new series came in May 1958, when a Los Angeles County Superior Court judge approved the contracts between the Thalia-Keethwyn production company and the two minor actors, Jacklyn O'Donnell and Sherri Alberoni. From a later story about the sale of the pilot episode, it must have been made just after the contract approvals. While showing the pilot to prospective buyers, the representatives for the production companies (Note: Harold Cohen of the Ashley-Steiner talent agency, representing Thalia-Keethwyn, and Henry White from Screen Gems) were asked the same question each time: "Isn't he a bit old to risk in the lead?" A previously secured affidavit of 72-year-old Ed Wynn's insurability answered that concern.

Newspapers reported the next month that NBC had picked up The Ed Wynn Show for broadcast on Thursday evenings. By mid-July, the premise of the show was released to the press, along with the starting date. The primary sponsor was Liggett & Myers Tobacco Company for its Chesterfield cigarette brand, with the commercials handled by McCann Erickson. Co-sponsor Bulova Watch Company bought up the remaining commercial time for the fall season.

The producer for Screen Gems was Ben Feiner, Jr. Actual filming, aside from the pilot episode, began August 4, 1958. The film used was 35 mm, with Westrex magnetic sound recording.

IMDb reports this show as having 16 episodes, but lists only 15. It is not known if the discrepancy is due to the pilot episode, the title of which is also not known. From contemporary newspaper accounts, only 14 episodes were listed in television schedules. As noted below, episode #5 may never have been broadcast.

== Reaction ==
Reviews after the debut broadcast agreed that the show's concept precluded Ed Wynn from displaying much of his talent, with the writing an even bigger problem. Barbara Delatiner in Newsday said: "...the opener gave the venerable star little opportunity to act and certainly very little in the way of comedy". William Ewald in his UPI syndicated column praised Wynn's performance as "warm and professional" but was blunt about the show itself: "It is a formula comedy complete with contrived situations and ha-ha-ha soundtrack". Harry Harris in The Philadelphia Inquirer felt the same way about Wynn versus the show's writing: "He's an ingratiating fellow, but some of the dialogue and plot assigned to him are almost indigestibly 'folksy'." After seeing two episodes, Canadian reviewer Les Wedman wrote in The Province: "Mr. Wynn is fun to watch but the storyline appears likely to be a continued thin one. And the dialogue isn't half as funny as the canned laughter would try to convince us it is".

When interviewed by Steven H. Scheuer about the critical reception, Ed Wynn defended the show. "People call the show corny... I admit I don't expect Brooks Atkinson to like my little show, but this isn't for sophisticated New York or Hollywood. It's a clean show and it has heart."

== Broadcast history ==
The first episode broadcast was on Thursday, September 25, 1958, at 8 pm. It replaced You Bet Your Life in that time slot, which moved to the later time of 10 pm Thursday. It was initially bracketed by two game shows on NBC Thursday evenings: Tic-Tac-Dough preceded it at 7:30 pm (Note: In a few markets a game show called Haggis Baggis was seen instead.) and Twenty-One followed it at 8:30 pm. The latter show had been moved from Mondays.

The show was pre-empted by an hour long Bell Telephone Science Series special on Oct 23rd, 1958. The episode originally scheduled for that date, "Laurie's Career", may not have ever been broadcast.

By early November, a columnist reported that a cigarette sponsor was considering dropping The Ed Wynn Show for a new Jack Webb series.

The last episode broadcast was on January 1, 1959. A week later Steve Canyon was moved from Saturdays to replace The Ed Wynn Show in that Thursday 8pm time slot.

=== Episodes ===
No. overall	No. in season	Title	Directed by	Written by	Original release date
1	1	"Sincerely Sam Hill"	William Russell	Devery Freeman	September 25, 1958
Laurie's college friends fill the spare rooms at the Beamer house, causing John's arrest on a zoning violation. Cast: Jesslyn Fax, Myrna Fahey, Jacklyn O'Donnell, Sherry Alberoni, Herb Vigran, Maureen Cassidy, Norman Ollestad, Gary Vinson, Charles Arnt
2	2	"The Crossing Guard"	Arthur Lubin	Arthur Julian; Bill Davenport	October 2, 1958
John Beamer substitutes for vacationing crossing guard but nearly costs him his job. Cast: Howard Wright, Ross Ford, Elaine Edwards, Frank Wilcox, June White
3	3	"The Scholarship"	Unknown	Unknown	October 9, 1958
John Beamer helps student get college scholarship over faculty objections. Cast: Eugene Persson, Sheila Bromley, Ralph Clanton
4	4	"Nature Knows Best"	Unknown	Unknown	October 16, 1958
Beamer disapproves of Laurie's new boyfriend hanging around, so tries to find him a job. Cast: Robert Levin
5	5	"Laurie's Career"	TBA	TBA	TBA
(Pre-empted episode) Cast:
6	6	"Lover's Lane"	Unknown	Unknown	October 30, 1958
Beamer launches crusade to save public recreation area from highway development. Cast:
7	7	"The Jalopy Derby"	Unknown	Unknown	November 6, 1958
After catching a juvenile car thief, Beamer enters him into a hot rod race. Cast:
8	8	"Younger Than Autumn"	Unknown	Unknown	November 13, 1958
Beamer volunteers for town's centennial celebration but finds he isn't needed. Cast:
9	9	"A Date with Mrs. Creavy"	Unknown	Unknown	November 20, 1958
Beamer's efforts to play Cupid for Laurie land him a date with Mrs. Creavy. Cast: Jesslyn Fax
10	10	"The Parking Ticket"	Unknown	Unknown	November 27, 1958
After giving a radio lecture on good citizenship, Beamer gets a parking ticket. Cast:
11	11	"Aunt Lydia Comes to Town"	Unknown	Unknown	December 4, 1958
Beamer fears Laurie's Aunt Lydia is turning her into a cynical sophisticate. Cast: Virginia Field
12	12	"New Boy in Town"	Unknown	Unknown	December 11, 1958
Show biz "brat" makes himself unpopular at the local junior high school. Cast: Carol Morris, Richard Eyer, Harvey Grant
13	13	"Exchange Professor"	Unknown	Unknown	December 18, 1958
Physics professor lets Beamer down by no-showing a paid speaking event. Cast: Duncan McLeod
14	14	"Midge's Award"	Unknown	Unknown	December 25, 1958
Midge fears having to live with Aunt Gertrude if she doesn't win scholarship award. Cast: Isabel Randolph
15	15	"New York Adventure"	Unknown	Unknown	January 1, 1959
Beamer goes to New York to persuade company heads to keep local pajama factory open. Cast:
