= Louis Falco =

American dancer and choreographer (1942–1993)

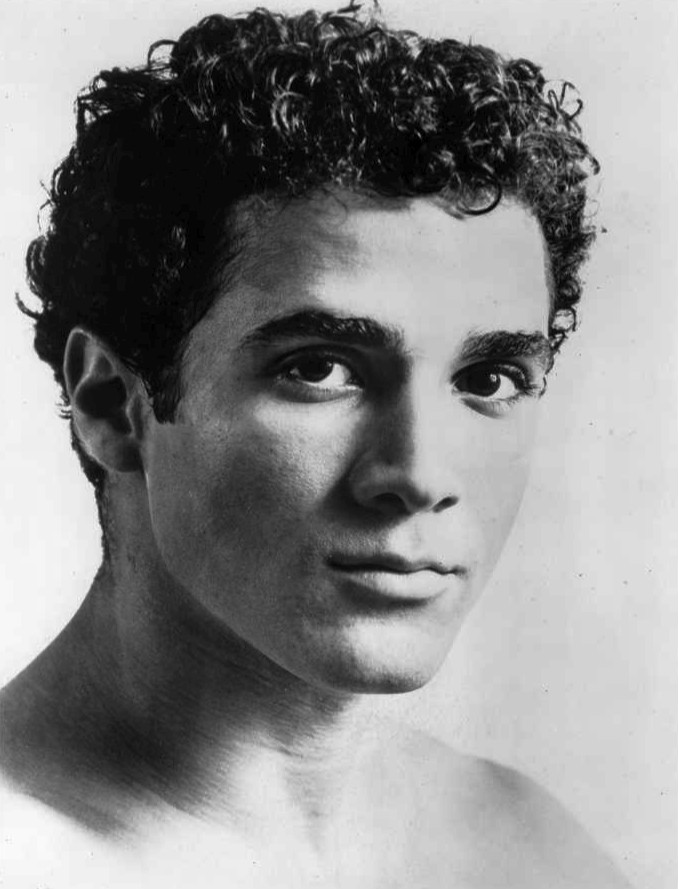
- Falco in 1969
- Born: August 2, 1942; New York City
- Died: March 26, 1993 (aged 50); New York City
- Occupations: Dancer, choreographer
- Years active: 1960–1993

Louis Falco (August 2, 1942 – March 26, 1993) was an American dancer and choreographer.

== Life and career ==
Louis Falco was born in New York City of southern Italian immigrant parents. He began his study of dance in the 1950s at The Henry Street Playhouse with Murray Louis and Alwin Nikolais. He attended the High School of Performing Arts and as a student began performing with Charles Weidman. In 1960 he began dancing professionally with José Limón, and also appeared with Flower Hujer, Alvin Ailey and Donald McKayle. He danced with the José Limón Dance Company from 1960–70, often partnering Sarah Stackhouse. He danced opposite Rudolf Nureyev in Limon's The Moor's Pavane on Broadway from 1974-75. His farewell performance was with Luciana Savignano at La Scala Opera House in Milan in The Eagle's Nest. Falco was considered an extraordinarily gifted dancer and charismatic performer.

Falco made his debut as a choreographer in 1967. He was awarded Guggenheim Fellowship in Choreography in 1970. He was one of the first choreographers to experiment with rock bands and other innovations on stage, and he was noted for works created for his Louis Falco Dance Company and for his choreography of the 1980 motion picture Fame. After the explosive success of the film, he began a career in commercial choreography including music videos for a number of MTV artists. The Falco Company's last performance in New York City was for the inauguration of the Joyce Theater in 1982.

Falco completed choreography for several films and commissioned dance works, some of which were never performed in the United States. In 1986, he was recognized for a series of award winning television commercials. He died from AIDS in 1993.

== Works ==
Selected works include:

- Escargot
- The Sleepers
- Caviar
- Journal
- Argot
- Huescape
- Timewright
- Caviar
- The Eagle's Nest
- Nights In A Spanish Garden
- Tutti-frutti
- Cooking French
- Jack-In-The-Box
- Reunion in Portugal
- Journal
- Eclipse
- Caterpillar
- The Lobster Quadrille
- The Gamete Garden

Selected music videos:

- Kiss for Prince
- Why Can't I Have You for The Cars
- Country Boy for Ricky Skaggs
