= Harp McGuire =

American actor (1921–1966)

- Harp McGuire in Perry Mason 1962
- Born: Henry Herbert McGuire; November 1, 1921
- Died: October 21, 1966 (aged 44)

Henry Herbert "Harp" McGuire (November 1, 1921 – October 21, 1966) was an American actor who worked for a number of years in Australia, becoming very famous on Australian radio. He reached the height of his fame when he appeared as Randy Stone in the Australian adaptation of the NBC radio serial 'Night Beat' produced by Grace Gibson Radio Productions.

McGuire was a native of Nashville, Tennessee, born on November 1, 1921. He worked in American film and TV productions such as "On the Beach" (1959), "The Twilight Zone" (1959) and the "Outlaws" (1960). He also played a gas station attendant on a segment of "Leave It To Beaver."

McGuire died in Los Angeles, California, on October 21, 1966, after suffering from coronary sclerosis.

== Filmography ==
Year	Title	Role	Notes
1955	Captain Thunderbolt	Mannix	
1959	On the Beach	Lieutenant Sunderstrom	
1960	Alfred Hitchcock Presents	Steven	Season 5 Episode 24: "Madame Mystery"
1960	Alfred Hitchcock Presents	Leo / William Graves	Season 6 Episode 11: "The Man with Two Faces"
1960	Inherit the Wind	Harry Esterbrook	Uncredited
1960	Cage of Evil	Detective Murray Kearns	
1960	The Walking Target	Detective Max Brodney	
1962	Moon Pilot	Federal Security Driver	Uncredited
1962	Incident in an Alley	Frank	
