= Jackpot (musical) =

Jackpot is an American musical with music by Vernon Duke, lyrics by Howard Dietz, and a musical book by Guy Bolton, Sidney Sheldon, and Ben Roberts. The musical premiered on Broadway at the Alvin Theatre on January 13, 1944. It closed on March 11, 1944 after a total of 69 performances. Directed by Roy Hargrave, the production starred Nanette Fabray as Sally Madison, Betty Garrett as Sgt. Maguire, Allan Jones as Hank Trimble, and, in the small role of Edna, future novelist Jacqueline Susann (Valley of the Dolls). Choreographer Flower Hujer danced in the production. A wartime musical designed to boost morale in the U.S. during World War II, Jackpot failed to garner a following among critics and audiences. A few songs from the show were published: I've Got A One Track Mind, Sugarfoot, There Are Yanks (From the Banks of the Wabash), and What Happened?.

== Sources ==
- The Theatre: New Musical in Manhattan, Time, January 24, 1944
- Show tunes: the songs, shows, and careers of Broadway's major composers by Steven Suskin, page 165
