= Incident in an Alley =

1962 film by Edward L. Cahn

- Directed by: Edward L. Cahn
- Screenplay by: Harry Medford; Orville H. Hampton (as Owen Harris)
- Based on: Rod Serling (from a story by)
- Produced by: Robert E. Kent
- Starring: Chris Warfield; Erin O'Donnell; Harp McGuire
- Cinematography: Gilbert Warrenton
- Edited by: Robert Carlisle
- Music by: Richard LaSalle
- Color process: Black and white
- Production company: Harvard Film
- Distributed by: United Artists
- Release date: May 16, 1962
- Running time: 84 minutes
- Country: United States
- Language: English

Incident in an Alley is a 1962 American neo noir crime film directed by Edward L. Cahn and starring Chris Warfield, Erin O'Donnell and Harp McGuire.

The film's premise rests on a legal precedent that police may use force against fleeing suspects if the suspect has committed a crime and is warned of the officer's intent to shoot. In 1985, the Supreme Court of the United States ruled in the case of Tennessee v. Garner that deadly force may be used to prevent the escape of a fleeing felon only if the officer has probable cause to believe that the suspect poses a serious risk to the officer or to others.

== Plot ==
After beat cop Bill Joddy shoots and kills a fleeing suspect, the victim is found to be a 14-year-old boy. Joddy is charged with manslaughter but is acquitted by a jury. He begins to question his own culpability while trying to prove that the boy was participating in a robbery just before he was shot.

== Cast ==
- Chris Warfield as Bill Joddy
- Erin O'Donnell as Jean Joddy
- Harp McGuire as Frank
- Virginia Christine as Mrs. Connell
- Willis Bouchey as Police Capt. Tom Brady
- Don Keefer as Roy Swanson
- Michael Vandever as Gussie Connell
- Gary Judis as Charlie
- Jim Canino as Mushie (as James Canino)
- Clancy Cooper as Police Sergeant

== TV play ==
The film was based on a television play written by Rod Serling that had aired in 1955 as part of The United States Steel Hour starring Farley Granger.

== Production ==
It was then announced as a film project by United Artists. Clarence Greene and Russell Rouse were assigned to produce, with Serling adapting the screenplay, but the film was not made until several years later.

== Reception ==
In a contemporary review for The New York Times, critic Howard Thompson wrote: "For all its devious, transparent moralizing about the shooting of a young boy by a policeman, 'Incident in an Alley' belongs in one. The synthetic, floridly hewn little melodrama that opened yesterday on the circuits is strictly pulp stuff, conventionally posing a background of juvenile delinquency and the business of adult 'responsibility.'"

== See also ==
- List of American films of 1962
