= By Jupiter =

1942 musical

- Ray Bolger in the original Broadway production
- Music: Richard Rodgers
- Lyrics: Lorenz Hart
- Book: Lorenz Hart; Richard Rodgers
- Basis: The Warrior's Husband by Julian F. Thompson
- Productions: 1942 Broadway; 1967 Off-Broadway revival

By Jupiter is a musical with a book by Lorenz Hart and Richard Rodgers, music by Rodgers, and lyrics by Hart. The musical is based on the play The Warrior's Husband by Julian F. Thompson, set in the land of the Amazons. By Jupiter premiered on Broadway in 1942 and starred Ray Bolger, and was the last musical written by Rodgers and Hart; when Hart’s erratic behavior was often the cause of friction between him and Rodgers and led to a breakup of their partnership the following year before his death. Rodgers then began collaborating with Oscar Hammerstein II.

== Synopsis ==
In the land of the Amazons the women rule and do battle while the men stay at home, mind the children, and buy new hats. An army of Greek soldiers, led by Theseus and Hercules, arrives in search of the Sacred Girdle of Diana, currently in the hands of reigning Queen Hippolyta. Accompanying them is war correspondent Homer, author of a recent bestseller called The Iliad. The Greek warriors are captured by the Amazons, and romance blossoms between Theseus and Antiope, the warrior-leader of the Amazons. A subplot involves Hippolyta's foppish husband Sapiens, forced on her by his wealthy mother, in exchange for financing the war against the Greeks, who employs his "non-traditionally-male wiles" to get his way with the opposite sex.

== Productions ==
The Broadway production opened at the Shubert Theatre on June 3, 1942, and closed on June 12, 1943, after 427 performances. Directed by Joshua Logan and choreographed by Robert Alton, the cast included Ray Bolger, Benay Venuta, Vera-Ellen, and Constance Moore, who was replaced by Nanette Fabray later in the run. Choreographer Flower Hujer danced in the production.

At one point, 20th Century Fox considered pairing Laurel and Hardy with Martha Raye in a movie version of the show, but the idea was eventually shelved.

A revival opened Off-Broadway at the Theatre Four on January 19, 1967, and closed on April 30, 1968, after 118 performances. This production had new material by Fred Ebb. Directed by Christopher Hewett with choreography and musical staging by Ellen Ray, Bob Dishy headed the cast. An original cast recording was released of this production, reissued in CD on September 11, 2007, by DRG.

Ian Marshall Fisher's Discovering Lost Musicals Charitable Trust presented a concert staging in London at the Barbican Center, Cinema 1 in May 1992, with Louise Gold as Hippolyta and Jon Glover as Sapiens. Issy Van Randwyck was also among the cast.

42nd Street Moon, San Francisco, California, presented a staged concert from April 17 – May 12, 2002.

Musicals in Mufti at the York Theatre in New York City presented a staged concert from April 5–7, 2002.

Village Light Opera Group at Vineyard's Dimson Theatre in New York City presented a staging of the musical from May 17-19, 2019 directed by Michael Blatt, with music direction by James Higgins and special guest appearances from Lorenz Hart's nephew, Larry Hart, and librettist/lyricist Michael Colby.

The musical proved to be not only Rodgers and Hart's longest-running Broadway hit, but their last full-length work. (They collaborated on a revision of their 1927 show A Connecticut Yankee in 1943, writing six new numbers.)

== Roles and original cast ==
- Sapiens (Latin word meaning “wise”) – Ray Bolger
- Hippolyta – Benay Venuta
- Antiope – Constance Moore
- Theseus – Ronald Graham
- Achilles – Bob Douglas
- Herald – Mark Dawson
- Agamemnon/First Slave – Robert Hightower
- Second Amazon Dancer – Flower Hujer
- Minerva/First Camp Follower – Vera-Ellen
- Second Slave – William Hightower
- Pomposia – Bertha Belmore
- Buria – Jayne Manners
- First Sentry – Martha Burnett
- Second Sentry – Rose Inghram
- Third Sentry – Kay Kimber
- Sergeant – Monica Moore
- Homer – Berni Gould
- Penelope – Irene Corlett
- Heroica – Margaret Bannerman
- Caustica – Maidel Turner
- Hercules – Ralph Dumke
- First Amazon Dancer/Ensemble – Marjorie Moore
- First Boy/Ensemble – Don Liberto
- Second Boy/Ensemble – Tony Matthews
- Third Boy/Ensemble – William Yaux
- Huntress/Second Camp Follower/Ensemble – Helen Bennett
- Amazon Runner/Ensemble – Wana Wenerholm
- Third Camp Follower/Ensemble – Ruth Brady
- Fourth Camp Follower/Ensemble – Joyce Ring
- Fifth Camp Follower/Ensemble – Rosemary Sanky

== Song list ==
Act I

- “For Jupiter and Greece” – Achilles and the Herald
- “The Amazons” – Danced by the First Amazon Dancer and Amazon Warriors
- “Jupiter Forbid” – Sung by Hippolyta, Antiope, and Three Sentries, Danced by the Second Amazon Dancer, Two Slaves, and Ensemble
- “Life with Father” – Sapiens
- “Nobody's Heart Belongs to Me” – Antiope
- “The Gateway of the Temple of Minerva” – Theseus and Ensemble
- “Life with Father (Reprise)” – Pomposia and Sapiens
- “Here's a Hand” – Theseus and Antiope
- “No, Mother, No” – Sapiens and Ensemble

Act II

- “The Boy I Left Behind Me” – Buria and Ensemble
- “Nobody's Heart Belongs to Me (Reprise)” – Sapiens
- “Ev'rything I've Got” – Sapiens and Hippolyta
- “Bottoms Up” – Herald, Hippolyta, Antiope, Homer, Achilles, Minerva, the Second Amazon Dancer, Two Slaves, and Ensemble
- “Careless Rhapsody” – Antiope and Theseus
- “Finaletto” – Sapiens, Hippolyta, Pomposia, and Ensemble
- “Ev'rything I've Got (Reprise)” – Hippolyta
- “Wait Till You See Her” – Theseus and Ensemble
- “Now That I've Got My Strength” – Sapiens, Penelope, Minerva, and Ensemble
- “Finale” – Company
