= Herb Vigran =

American actor (1910–1986)

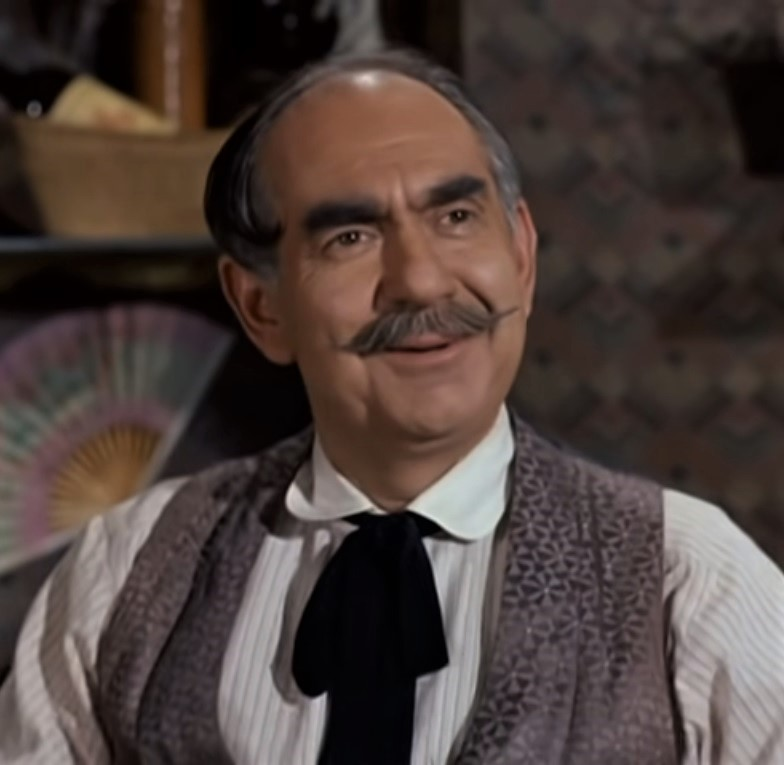
- Vigran in the television series Bonanza in "San Francisco", 1960
- Born: Herbert (or Herburt) Vigran; June 5, 1910; Cincinnati, Ohio, U.S.
- Died: November 29, 1986 (aged 76); Los Angeles, California, U.S.
- Occupation: Actor
- Years active: 1934–1986
- Spouse: Belle Pasternack (m. 1952)
- Children: 2

Herbert Vigran (Note: The California Death Index lists Vigran's first name as Herburt, rather than Herbert, as do his obituaries in the Los Angeles Times and The New York Times.) (June 5, 1910 – November 29, 1986) was an American character actor in Hollywood from the 1930s to the 1980s. Over his 50-year career, he made over 350 television and film appearances, notably as Lurvy in Charlotte's Web.

== Early years ==
Vigran was born in Cincinnati on June 5, 1910. His family moved to Fort Wayne, Indiana, when he was 16. He graduated with a Bachelor of Laws (LL.B.) from Indiana University School of Law (Bloomington) in 1933, but later chose to pursue acting.

== Stage ==
Billed as Herbert Vigran, he appeared on Broadway in three plays from 1935 through 1938: Achilles Had a Heel (1935), Cyrano de Bergerac (1936), and Having Wonderful Time (1937). He also toured in Cyrano de Bergerac.

== Radio ==
After starting out on Broadway, Vigran soon moved to Hollywood with no money and only the Broadway acting experience. He first worked in radio in 1937 on Five Star Final and Our Gal Sunday. In 1939, Vigran's agent helped him secure a lead in the radio drama Silver Theatre. The actor had a $5 recording made of the radio show and used it as a demo to get other jobs with his unique voice. He performed in radio shows with the likes of Jack Benny, Bob Hope, Lucille Ball and Jimmy Durante.

== Military service ==
Vigran had basic training with the Army in 1943, after which he was made responsible for entertainment at Torney General Hospital in Palm Springs. He was released in October 1945.

== Television ==
He later had hundreds of television appearances on shows like Adventures of Superman (six episodes), Dragnet (eleven episodes), The Adventures of Ozzie and Harriet (seven episodes), The Dick Van Dyke Show (three episodes), Perry Mason (two episodes), Dragnet 1967 (seven episodes), Petticoat Junction (one episode, 1969), and The Brady Bunch (two episodes). Vigran had a recurring role as Judge Brooker in Gunsmoke between 1970 and 1975. He appeared in four I Love Lucy episodes, and in the 1954 episode titled "Lucy Is Envious", Vigran is the promoter who hired Lucy and Ethel to dress up as "Women from Mars" for a publicity stunt. With his bushy eyebrows and balding pate, he was easily cast in a wide variety of middle-aged "everyman" roles: cops, small-time crooks, judges, jurors, bartenders, repairmen, neighbors, shopkeepers, etc.

== Film ==
Vigran had a small but significant role in Charlie Chaplin's Monsieur Verdoux (1947) as a reporter who interviews Chaplin as the title character while he is awaiting execution, while 1954's White Christmas starring Bing Crosby and Danny Kaye saw Vigran in the role of Novello, a nightclub owner who ushers in the stars to see his floor show attraction, The Haines Sisters.

In the rock and roll movie Go, Johnny, Go! (1959), Vigran played an assistant to promoter Alan Freed and performed dialogue scenes with rock musician Chuck Berry. He also provided the voice of "Whitney's boss" in a series of Arrowhead bottled water commercials for television and radio in the 1960s.

== Personal life ==
In 1952, Vigran married Belle Pasternack. The couple had two sons.

Vigran was active up until his death.

== Death ==
Vigran died of complications from cancer at age 76 at Cedars-Sinai Medical Center in Los Angeles. He was cremated.

== Stage, radio, television, and film appearances ==
=== Theater ===
Date	Title	Role
October 13, 1935 – October 1935	Achilles Had a Heel	Monkey and other members of society
April 27, 1936 – June 1936	Cyrano de Bergerac	A Cavalier
February 20, 1937 – January 8, 1938	Having a Wonderful Time	Honeymooner

=== Radio ===
Year	Title	Role	Network	Notes
1939	Silver Theatre	actor	CBS	
1942–?	Those We Love	"Nosey" Jones	?	
1946	The Sad Sack	Sad Sack	CBS	Summer replacement for The Frank Sinatra Show
1946–1949	The Eddie Cantor Show	supporting actor	NBC and CBS	
1947–1952	California Caravan	supporting actor	Mutual-Don Lee	
1948	The Damon Runyon Theater	Harry the Horse	various	52 shows on records sold to various networks until mid-1950s
1949–1953	Father Knows Best	neighbor	NBC	
1949–1954	Broadway Is My Beat	supporting actor	CBS	
1950–1952	The Halls of Ivy	supporting actor	NBC	
1950–1951	Tales of the Texas Rangers	supporting actor	NBC	
1953–1954	Family Skeleton	supporting actor	CBS	
1979–1981	Sears Radio Theater	supporting actor	CBS-Mutual	

=== Television ===
Year	Title	Role	Episode
1950	The Stu Erwin Show	Jack Roberts	Father Gets Into the Act
1951	The George Burns and Gracie Allen Show	Mr. Norman, Pest Control Man	Too Much of the Mortons
1952	Dragnet	Jocko Harris	The Big Seventeen
1952	Gruen Guild Theater	Cop	Al Haddon's Lamp
1952	Rebound	Lewis	The Money
1952	Gang Busters	Detective Denny	The Blonde Tigress
1952	All Star Revue	Bearded Man	(23 February 1952)
1952	Racket Squad	Unknown role	Fair Exchange
1952	Four Star Playhouse	Monty Leeds	Dante's Inferno
1952	Adventures of Superman	Mortimer Murray	No Holds Barred
1952	The Adventures of Ozzie and Harriet	Policeman	Riviera Ballet
1952	I Married Joan	Fan at Hockey Game	Birthday
1952	I Love Lucy	Jule	The Anniversary Present
1952	I Love Lucy	Jule	The Saxophone
1952	My Little Margie	J.D. Toomey, Matchmaker	Missing Link
1952	My Little Margie	Toorney	Margie Plays Detective
1953	Our Miss Brooks	Mr. Smith	The Stolen Wardrobe
1953	The Life of Riley	Muley	Riley's Burning Ambition
1953	The Life of Riley	Muley	Riley Gets Engaged
1953	I Love Lucy	Joe, Washer Repairman	Never Do Business with Friends
1953	I Married Joan	Handyman	Honeymoon
1953	The Adventures of Ozzie & Harriet	Delivery Man	Bowling Alley
1953	The Adventures of Ozzie & Harriet	Mulligan	Oscillating Ozzie
1953	The Adventures of Ozzie & Harriet	Newspaper Delivery Man	The Boy's Paper Route
1953	Four Star Playhouse	Monte, Bartender	The Squeeze
1953	Four Star Playhouse	Monte, Bartender	The Hard Way
1953	Four Star Playhouse	3rd Reporter	The Girl on the Park Bench
1953	Dragnet	Actor	The Big Cop
1953	Dragnet	Mr. Miller	The Big Hate
1953	Dragnet	Gerald Adams	The Big Light
1953	Dragnet	Desk Clerk	The Big Little Jesus. A remake of this episode was filmed for Dragnet 1968 using many of the same actors.
1953	Life with Luigi	Unknown role	The Dance
1954	I Love Lucy	Al Sparks	Lucy Is Envious
1954	The Adventures of Ozzie & Harriet	Plasterer	The Bird's Nest
1954	Dragnet	Pete Eigen	The Big Quack
1954	Dragnet	Eugene Murray	The Big Frame
1954	Dragnet	Dale Eggers	The Big Kid
1954	The Joe Palooka Story	Pete Gurney	A Turkey for Terry
1954	December Bride	Eustace	My Soldier
1954	The Mickey Rooney Show	Police Captain	The Grunion Hunt Mystery
1954	Four Star Playhouse	Actor	Indian Taker
1954	Four Star Playhouse	Lieutenant Richards	Never Explain
1954	Adventures of Superman	Legs Lemmy	Jimmy Olsen, Boy Editor
1954	My Little Margie	Role unknown	A Job for Freddie
1954	General Electric Theater	Actor	Here Comes Calvin
1954	Schlitz Playhouse	Walt Carter	The Jungle Trap
1954	It's a Great Life	Policeman	The Driver's License
1955	Schlitz Playhouse	Hendricks	Wild Call
1955	It's a Great Life	Frank Slade	Hash House
1955	It's a Great Life	Night Club Owner	Denny Sings
1955	TV Reader's Digest	Ben Hartford	Ordeal at Yuba Gap
1955	TV Reader's Digest	Paul	Human Nature Through a Rear View Mirror
1955	The 20th Century Fox Hour	Postal Clerk	The Miracle on 34th Street
1955	The Danny Thomas Show	3rd Baseball Coach	Little League
1955	My Little Margie	Role unknown	Matinee Idol
1955	The George Burns and Gracie Allen Show	Cab Driver	Gracie Pawns Her Ring
1955	Adventures of Superman	Cy Horton	Superman Week
1955	Four Star Playhouse	Monte, Bartender	A Bag of Oranges
1955	Four Star Playhouse	Monte, Bartender	The House Always Wins
1955	Four Star Playhouse	Smiley Hayes	The Thin Line
1955	Dragnet	Leonard Clark	The Big Mask
1955	Tales of the Texas Rangers	Warren Jamison	Singing on the Trail
1955	Screen Directors Playhouse	Role unknown	The Life of Vernon Hathaway
1955	Father Knows Best	George	Father Is a Dope
1955	Topper	Fenster	Topper's Vacation
1955	The Whistler	Role unknown	Dark Hour
1955	Waterfront	Craig	Catalina Swim
1955	The Jack Benny Program	Hank the All Night Disc Jockey	Four O'Clock in the Morning Show
1955	The Jack Benny Program	Carnival Barker	Jack Takes the Beavers to the Fair
1955	The Jack Benny Program	Quiz Man	Jack Visits Dennis' Home
1955	The Jack Benny Program	Man in Life Vest	Jack Hunts for Uranium
1956	The Adventures of Ozzie & Harriet	Gas Station Attendant	Waiting for Joe
1956	Four Star Playhouse	Monte, Bartender	High Stakes
1956	Four Star Playhouse	Marc	Safe Keeping
1956	Four Star Playhouse	Monte, Bartender	No Limit
1956	Four Star Playhouse	Monte, Bartender	A Long Way from Texas
1956	Four Star Playhouse	Monte, Bartender	The Stacked Deck
1956	Four Star Playhouse	Sam Rawlings	The Stand-In
1956	Cavalcade of America	Bernie	Innocent Bystander
1956	Alfred Hitchcock Presents	Newsman	Season 2 Episode 7: Alibi Me
1956	The Life and Legend of Wyatt Earp	Rakle	Wyatt's Love Affair
1956	Jane Wyman Presents	Mr. Gordon	Assignment Champ
1956	The Best in Mystery	Monte	Unknown episode
1956	The Ford Television Theatre	Andy Thompson	A Past Remembered
1956	The Adventures of Falcon	Role unknown	Kiss Me Not
1956	Alarm	Sammy Fox	
1956	Chevron Hall of Stars	Corcoran	The Bequest
1956	Adventures of Superman	Arnold Woodman	Blackmail
1956	Our Miss Brooks	Mr Garson Felix	Acting Director
1956	Our Miss Brooks	Phil Waddley	The Skeleton in the Closet
1956	General Electric Theater	News Editor	Emergency Call
1956	It's a Great Life	Mickey Spade	Private Eyes
1956	General Electric Summer Originals	Actor	Jungle Trap
1956	General Electric Summer Originals	Actor	The Unwilling Witness
1956	Hey, Jeannie!	Bus driver	Jeannie Goes to Washington
1956	The People's Choice	an Agent	2 episodes, "Sock and the Movie Offer" and "Sock vs. Stone Kenyon"
1957	Hey, Jeannie!	Weltman	Jeannie's Income Tax
1957	Schlitz Playhouse	Jason	Clothes Make the Man
1957	The 20th Century-Fox Hour	Joe	Deadline Decision
1957	Richard Diamond, Private Detective	Johnson	The Big Score
1957	The Danny Thomas Show	Harry	Lose Me in Las Vegas
1957	Bachelor Father	Manager	Uncle Bentley Keeps His Promise
1957	Adventures of Superman	Georgie Gleap	Mr. Zero
1957	Leave It to Beaver	Barber	Brotherly Love
1957	Code 3	Mr. Carl	Case 2206
1957	Circus Boy	Man	The Gentle Giant
1957	Blondie	J. Tyler Grant	Puppy Love
1957	Shower of Stars	Policeman in Courtroom Skit	Star Time
1957	The Jack Benny Program	Male Pickpocket	John Forsythe Show
1957	Mr. Adams and Eve	Harry	The Comedians
1958	Adventures of Superman	Mugsy Maples	The Big Forget
1958	The Jack Benny Program	Milkman	Railroad Station Program
1958	The Jack Benny Program	Sam, Jack's Writer	Hillbilly Act
1958	The Jack Benny Program	Sales Clerk	Christmas Gift Exchange
1958	Dragnet (1951 TV series)	Harry Venner	The Big Wardrobe
1959	Dragnet	Actor	The Big Bray
1958	The Real McCoys	Ralph Wilson	The New Dog
1958	The Adventures of Rin Tin Tin	Professor Wirt	The Cloudbusters
1958	Colgate Theatre	Role unknown	If You Knew Tomorrow
1958	The Ed Wynn Show	Ernie Hinshaw	All 15 episodes
1958	Man Without a Gun	Unknown role	Aftermath
1958	Trackdown	Bartender	The Bounty Hunter
1958	Perry Mason	Charlie	The Case of the Haunted Husband
1958	Tales of Wells Fargo	Spears	Scapegoat
1958	26 Men	Role unknown	The Vanquisher
1958	26 Men	Role unknown	Hondo Man
1958	Richard Diamond, Private Detective	George	A Cup of Black Coffee
1958	Colgate Theatre		If You Knew Tomorrow
1958	The Restless Gun	Jim Pincher	The Whip
1959	The Restless Gun	Sheriff Longhorn	A Very Special Investigator
1959	The Ann Sothern Show	Pete Wilson	Katy Mismanages
1959	Tightrope	Phil	Black Tie Kill
1959	The Untouchables	Jake Lingle	The Jake Lingle Killing
1959	The Texan	Sandy Potts	The Ringer
1959	M Squad	Danny	Murder in C-Sharp Minor
1959	Love and Marriage	Role unknown	Stubby Picks a Winner
1959	The Dennis O'Keefe Show	Harry The Waiter	Moon Man
1959	Whirlybirds	Lieutenant	Obsession
1959	Wanted: Dead or Alive	Bartender	Rope Law
1959	The Jack Benny Program	Actor	Jack Webb Show
1960	The Jack Benny Program	2nd Policeman	Jack Arrested for Disturbing the Peace
1960	Peter Gunn	Ben Keller	Take Five for Murder
1960	The Best of the Post	Train Conductor	The Little Terror
1960	Angel	Role Unknown	The French Touch
1960	The DuPont Show with June Allyson	Art	The Doctor and the Redhead
1960	Alcoa Presents: One Step Beyond	Grocery Wagon Driver	Earthquake
1960	Mr. Magoo	Mr. McCloy	Magoo Meets McBoing Boing
1960	Maverick	Ed Cramer	The Bold Fenian Men
1960	Maverick	Pender	Hadley's Hunters
1960	The Many Loves of Dobie Gillis	Policeman	The Unregistered Nurse
1960	The Donna Reed Show	Mr. Sprague	Jeff, the Financial Genius
1960	The Ann Sothern Show	Pete Wilson	The Woman Behind the Throne
1960	Bonanza	Bartender	San Francisco
1960	Perry Mason	Ernest Pritchard	The Case of the Slandered Submarine
1960	Bachelor Father	Baliff	Peter Gets Jury Notice
1960	Bachelor Father	City Clerk	The Fortune Cookie Caper
1961	Bachelor Father	The Proprietor	Kelly and the Freethinker
1961	Tales of Wells Fargo	The Shop Keeper	A Killing in Calico
1961	Bonanza	Bartender	The Bride
1961	The Many Loves of Dobie Gillis	Rosenbloom	Take Me to Your Leader
1961	The Donna Reed Show	Judge	Tony Martin Visits
1961	Maverick	Mr. Butler	The Golden Fleecing
1961	Laramie	Unknown role	Handful of Fire
1961	Lawman	Walt Perkins	The Catalog Woman
1961	The Roaring 20's	Role unknown	Another Time, Another War
1961	The Law and Mr. Jones	Mr. Reiman	A Very Special Citizen
1961	Checkmate	Bartender	Phantom Lover
1961	77 Sunset Strip	Augie	Strange Bedfellows
1961	Westinghouse Playhouse	Vince	Poker Game
1961	The Jack Benny Program	Meat Vendor	Jack at Supermarket
1961	The Jack Benny Program	Ex-lawyer	Main Street Shelter
1961	The Bob Newhart Show	Himself	Episode 1.1
1962	The Flintstones	Cop	Fred's New Boss
1962	The Flintstones	Cop	Kleptomaniac Caper
1962	The Flintstones	Cop	The Mailman Cometh
1962	Maverick	Elkins	Marshal Maverick
1962	The Jack Benny Program	Photographer	Jack Does Opera
1962	The Jack Benny Program	Mr. Tinmin	Jack Is Violin Teacher
1962	Surfside 6	Al	Find Leroy Burdette
1962	Pete and Gladys	Bill	Pete's Hobby
1962	The Andy Griffith Show	Bill Medwin	The Bookie Barber
1962	The Dick Van Dyke Show	First Juror	One Angry Man
1962	Mister Ed	Joe Burke	Horse Wash
1963	Mister Ed	Postman	Taller Than She
1963	The Danny Thomas Show	Barber	Here's the $50 Back
1963	The Lucy Show	Umpire	Lucy and Viv Play Softball
1963	The Lucy Show	Dr. Jacoby	Lucy and the Little League
1963	McHale's Navy	Captain Wilson	Portrait of a Peerless Leader
1963	The Virginian	Arthur Wyman	To Make This Place Remember
1963	The Virginian	Drummer	The Exiles
1963	The Red Skelton Show	Guest	Bewitched, Bothered, and Brainless
1963	Hazel	Role unknown	An Example for Hazel
1963	The Dakotas	Olin Bates	Requiem at Dancer's Hill
1964	The Fugitive	Marty	Escape into Black
1964	The Rogues	Joe Motherwell	The Project Man
1964	The Bill Dana Show	Role unknown	Laughing Gas
1964	Arrest and Trial	Motel Clerk	A Circle of Strangers
1964	Temple Houston	Wak	Sam's Boy
1964	The Jack Benny Program	Bill	Don Breaks Leg
1964	The Jack Benny Program	Manager of Ice Cream Parlor	How Jack Found Dennis
1964	The Lucy Show	Postman	Lucy and the Missing Stamp
1964	The Dick Van Dyke Show	Bernie Quinn	The Pen Is Mightier Than the Mouth
1964	McHale's Navy	Congressman Fogelson	A Medal for Parker
1965	The Dick Van Dyke Show	Alfred Reinbeck	The Great Petrie Fortune
1965	The Andy Griffith Show	Gateman	The Taylors in Hollywood
1965	The Jack Benny Program	Publicity Agent	Dennis Opens a Bank Account
1965	The Jack Benny Program	Steve	Jack Appears on a Panel Show
1965	Wendy and Me	Henshaw	Danny's Double Life
1966	A Man Called Shenandoah	Judge	An Unfamiliar Tune
1966	Bewitched	Bartender	Fastest Gun on Madison Avenue
1966	The Lucy Show	Doctor	Lucy Gets Caught Up in the Draft
1966	The Beverly Hillbillies	Handler	The Trotting Horse
1966	McHale's Navy	Pete Morgan	Who Was That German I Saw You With?
1966	Gomer Pyle, U.S.M.C.	Waiter	Love's Old Sweet Song
1966	Gomer Pyle, U.S.M.C.	Barber	A Star Is Born
1966	Bonanza	Card Player	A Real Nice, Friendly Little Town
1967	Bonanza	Charlie	Joe Cartwright, Detective
1967	Petticoat Junction	Barney Morgan	It's Not Easy to Be a Mother
1967	Dragnet 1967	Desk Clerk	The Christmas Story
1967	Gomer Pyle, U.S.M.C.	First Tour Guide	Gomer Says 'Hey' to the President
1967	Gomer Pyle, U.S.M.C.	Waiter	Lou-Ann Poovie Sings Again
1967	Good Morning World	Mr. Keith	You Can't Say That About Me and Neither Can I
1967	It's About Time	Babcock	School Days, School Days
1967	My Three Sons	Caretaker	The Good Earth
1967	I Dream of Jeannie	Judge Hennessey	You Can't Arrest Me, I Don't Have a Driver's License
1968	Dragnet 1967	John Hagen	The Suicide Attempt
1968	Dragnet 1967	Pete Gulka	Public Affairs: DR-14
1968	The Mod Squad	Doctor	The Price of Terror
1968	The Adventures of Gulliver	Glum	The Forbidden Pool
1968	The New Adventures of Huckleberry Finn	Voice	The Little People
1968	The Mothers-in-Law	Judge	Herb's Little Helper
1969	The Governor & J.J.	Waiter	One Little Indian
1969	Hawaii Five-O	Willie	Just Lucky, I Guess
1969	Dragnet 1967	Mr. Sweep	Frauds: DR-28
1969	Dragnet 1967	Al Sousa	Homicide: The Student
1969	The Beverly Hillbillies	Mr. Armstrong	The Phantom Fifth Floor
1969	Petticoat Junction	Al	Goodbye, Mr. Chimp
1969	Mayberry R.F.D.	First Man	The Caper
1970	Mayberry R.F.D.	Jazz Jackson	The Mayberry Float
1970	The Brady Bunch	Harry	54–40 and Fight
1970	Dragnet 1967	Paul Woods	Homicide: Who Killed Who?
1970	Dragnet 1967	Erv Fowler	D.H.Q.: The Victims
1970	Love, American Style	Bill Jenks	Love and the King
1970	Gunsmoke	Judge Brooker	The Witness
1971	Gunsmoke	Judge Brooker	Lijah
1971	Gunsmoke	Judge Brooker	P.S. Murry Christmas
1971	Vanished	Joe Hotchkiss	TV movie
1971	Nanny and the Professor	The Judge	The Unknown Factor
1971	Make Room for Granddaddy	Delivery Man	The Big Hang-Up
1971	The Odd Couple	Brady Forecast	Engrave Trouble
1971	Inside O.U.T.	Harry	
1971	Bewitched	Sergeant	Darrin Goes Ape
1971	Adam-12	Salesman	Log 66: The Vandals
1972	Adam-12	Gus Archer	The Late Baby
1972	Bewitched	Sergeant	Sam's Witchcraft Blows a Fuse
1972	Bewitched	Sergeant	George Washington Zapped Here: Pt 1, Pt 2
1972	Emergency!	Committee Chairman	The Wedsworth-Townsend Act
1972	Longstreet	Unknown role	The Sound of Money Talking
1972	Gunsmoke	Judge Brooker	No Tomorrow
1972	Gunsmoke	Judge Brooker	One for the Road
1972	Gunsmoke	Judge Brooker	Alias Festus Haggin
1973	Gunsmoke	Judge Brooker	A Quiet Day in Dodge
1973	Gunsmoke	Judge Brooker	A Game of Death... An Act of Love: Pt 1
1973	Gunsmoke	Judge Brooker	A Game of Death... An Act of Love: Pt 2
1973	Gunsmoke	Judge Brooker	The Deadly Innocent
1973	Wait Till Your Father Gets Home	Voice	Mama Loves Monty
1973	The Addams Family	Unknown roles	Unknown episodes
1973	Chase	Unknown role	TV movie
1973	Adam-12	Sam Conrad	Southwest Division
1974	The Brady Bunch	Examiner	The Driver's Seat
1974	The Streets of San Francisco	Max	One Chance to Live
1974	Chico and the Man	Charlie	New Suit
1974	Kolchak: The Night Stalker	Mr. Goldstein	Horror in the Heights
1974	Gunsmoke	Judge Brooker	To Ride a Yeller Horse
1975	Gunsmoke	Judge Brooker	The Fires of Ignorance
1975	Babe	Heckler	TV movie
1976	Emergency!	Committee Chairman	Emergency! the Wedsworth-Townsend Act: Pt 1, Pt 2
1976	The Loneliest Runner	Guard	TV movie
1977	Emergency!	Lou	Firehouse Quintet
1977	Kill Me If You Can	Jury Foreman Hart	TV movie
1977	Testimony of Two Men	Stationmaster	TV Mini-Series
1978	The Flintstones: Little Big League	Judge Shale	
1979	Taxi	Weldon Manning	Sugar Mama
1979	Charlie's Angels	Weatherby	Angels on Vacation
1980	Galactica 1980	Pop	The Night the Cylons Landed: Part 2
1980	Knots Landing	Cabbie	Will the Circle Be Unbroken
1981	Lobo	Pops	T'he French Follies Caper
1982	I Was a Mail Order Bride	Casey	TV movie
1982	Shirt Tales	Mr. Dinkle	Unknown episodes
1982	Dallas	Judge Thornby	Adoption
1985	Remington Steele	Seymour Glass/Fred Melneck	Steele Trying
1985	The Jeffersons	Mr. Pelham	Hail to the Chief

=== Films ===
Year	Title	Role	Notes
1934	Happy Landing	Radio Operator	Uncredited
1934	Redhead	Factory Worker	Uncredited
1935	The Mystery Man	Fingerprint Man	Uncredited
1935	Behind the Green Lights	Photographer	Uncredited
1935	Vagabond Lady	Edgar, Man with Mike	Uncredited
1935	Ladies Crave Excitement	Harry	Uncredited
1935	Death from a Distance	Police Photographer	Uncredited
1935	Make a Million	Second Drunken Donor	Uncredited
1935	Skybound	Grant the Mechanic	Uncredited
1935	Cappy Ricks Returns	Worker	Uncredited
1936	Wash Your Step	Gag Writer	Uncredited
1939	Those High Grey Walls	Orderly	Uncredited
1940	It All Came True	Monks	
1940	Grandpa Goes to Town	Role unknown	Uncredited
1940	Two Girls on Broadway	Reporter	Uncredited
1940	Hold That Woman!	Furniture Company Repossessor	Uncredited
1940	Cross-Country Romance	Omaha Star-Herald Reporter	Uncredited
1940	Scatterbrain	Role unknown	Uncredited
1940	The Secret Seven	Salesman	Uncredited
1940	Stranger on the Third Floor	Reporter Who Wins Cardgame	Uncredited
1940	The Golden Fleecing	Taxi Driver	Uncredited
1940	I'm Still Alive	Second Doctor, After Truck Crash	Uncredited
1940	Dancing on a Dime	Cashier	Uncredited
1940	Behind the News	Reporter #1 on Phone	Uncredited
1941	City of Missing Girls	Danny Mason	Uncredited
1941	Country Fair	Role unknown	Uncredited
1941	Redhead remake	Role unknown	Uncredited
1941	Million Dollar Baby	Reporter	Uncredited
1941	Murder by Invitation	Eddie	
1941	Reg'lar Fellers	Radio Announcer	
1941	New York Town	Barker	Uncredited
1941	Who's a Dummy?	Role unknown	
1942	Rings on Her Fingers	Cab Driver	Uncredited
1942	Night in New Orleans	Player	Uncredited
1942	Pardon My Sarong	Wise Guy at Gas Station	Uncredited
1942	Secrets of a Co-Ed	Soapy	
1942	The Payoff	Reporter	Uncredited
1942	The Great Gildersleeve	George the Jeweller	Uncredited
1942	Secrets of the Underground	Street Photographer	Uncredited
1943	It Ain't Hay	Man in Microphone Room	Uncredited
1943	Dr. Gillespie's Criminal Case	Orderly	Uncredited
1943	Danger! Women at Work	Soldier	Uncredited
1943	Nobody's Darling	Photographer	Uncredited
1943	Sleepy Lagoon	Man	Uncredited
1943	Sweet Rosie O'Grady	Photographer	Uncredited
1943	The Ghost Ship	Chief Engineer	Uncredited
1946	Her Adventurous Night	Cop #2	Uncredited
1947	Monsieur Verdoux	Reporter	Uncredited
1947	The Burning Cross	Jim Todd, foreman	
1948	Joe Palooka in Fighting Mad	Reporter	
1948	All My Sons	Wertheimer	Uncredited
1948	The Noose Hangs High	Coat Thief	Uncredited
1948	Hazard	Role unknown	
1948	Texas, Brooklyn & Heaven	Man in Subway	Uncredited
1949	The Judge	Reporter with pipe	
1949	House of Strangers	Man Next to Gino at Fight	Uncredited
1949	Red, Hot and Blue'	Movie Usher in Trailer	Uncredited
1949	Tell It to the Judge	Reporter	Uncredited
1949	And Baby Makes Three	Mr. Woodley	Uncredited
1950	Side Street	Photographer	Uncredited
1950	The Damned Don't Cry!	Vito Maggio	Uncredited
1950	Mister 880	Carny Barker	Uncredited
1950	Let's Dance	Virgil, Chili Cabana Owner	Uncredited
1950	Mrs. O'Malley and Mr. Malone	Reporter with Pipe	Uncredited
1950	Hunt the Man Down	Collins' Aide	Uncredited
1950	Charlie's Haunt	Lawnmower Man	Uncredited
1951	Three Guys Named Mike	Mr. Kirk, Second Wolf on Plane	Uncredited
1951	Abbott and Costello Meet the Invisible Man	Stillwell	Uncredited
1951	Bedtime for Bonzo	Lieutenant Daggett	Credited as Herburt Vigran
1951	Half Angel	Thompson	Uncredited
1951	Appointment with Danger	Policeman	Uncredited
1951	Night Into Morning	Joe, the Bartender	
1951	No Questions Asked	Joe, Conventioneer	Uncredited
1951	Iron Man	Melio	Uncredited
1951	Behave Yourself!	Police Desk Sergeant	Uncredited
1951	The Racket	Paradise Club Manager	Uncredited
1952	Oklahoma Annie	Otto, Coffin Creek Cafe Croupier	Uncredited
1952	Aaron Slick from Punkin Crick	Barker	Uncredited
1952	Just Across the Street	Liquor Salesman	Uncredited
1952	O. Henry's Full House	Poker Player	(segment "The Clarion Call"), Uncredited
1952	The Rose Bowl Story	Rugger Grady	Uncredited
1952	Just for You	George, Jordan's Chauffeur	
1952	Somebody Loves Me	Lipscott, Theatrical Booker	Uncredited
1952	The Star	Roy	
1953	Never Wave at a WAC	Cheesecake Photographer	
1953	The Girl Next Door	Police Sergeant	
1953	Roar of the Crowd	Mr. Ashburn	
1953	The Band Wagon	Man on Train	
1953	So This Is Love	Nightclub M.C.	Uncredited
1953	Let's Do It Again	Charlie Foster, Theatre Manager	Uncredited
1953	So Big	Moving Boss	Uncredited
1953	Walking My Baby Back Home	Cab Driver	Uncredited
1953	The Long, Long Trailer	Trailer Salesman	Uncredited
1954	Lucky Me	Theatre Manager	Uncredited
1954	Susan Slept Here	Sergeant Sam Hanlon	
1954	Return from the Sea	Doctor	
1954	Dragnet (theatrical film based on TV series)	Mr. Archer	
1954	White Christmas	Novello, Nightclub Manager	Uncredited
1954	So You're Taking in a Roomer	Heimie Callahan	Uncredited
1954	So You Want to Know Your Relatives	Rocco Spumoni aka Rocco McDoakes	Uncredited
1954	20,000 Leagues Under the Sea	Reporter for the Globe	Uncredited
1955	Las Vegas Shakedown	Milton Dooley	
1955	Not as a Stranger	Lou, Pharmaceutical Salesman	Uncredited
1955	It's Always Fair Weather	Nashby	Uncredited
1955	The McConnell Story	Truck Driver	Uncredited
1955	Illegal	Municipal Court Bailiff	Uncredited
1955	Bobby Ware Is Missing	Charlie, Headwaiter	Uncredited
1955	Last of the Desperados	Coroner	Uncredited
1955	I Died a Thousand Times	Art	Uncredited
1955	Good Morning, Miss Dove	Mitchell, Police Desk Sergeant	Uncredited
1955	Hell on Frisco Bay	Phil, Cafe Owner	Uncredited
1955	At Gunpoint	Matt, Man Talking in Saloon About His Wife	Uncredited
1956	World Without End	Reporter	Uncredited
1956	Our Miss Brooks (theatrical film based on television series)	Herb	Uncredited
1956	Hilda Crane	TV Pitchman	Voice, Uncredited
1956	That Certain Feeling	TV Director	Uncredited
1956	Three for Jamie Dawn	Mr. Robbins	
1956	A Cry in the Night	Jensen, Sergeant at Police Desk	
1956	These Wilder Years	Traffic Cop	
1956	The Boss	George, Attorney General	Uncredited
1956	Calling Homicide	Ray Engel	
1956	You Can't Run Away from It	Detective	
1956	The Girl Can't Help It	Bartender	Uncredited
1957	Public Pigeon No. One	Club Manager	
1957	The Midnight Story	Charlie Cuneo	
1957	The Vampire	George Ryan, Police Sergeant	
1957	A Hatful of Rain	Loud Man in Elevator	Uncredited
1957	Gunsight Ridge	R.B. Davis, Justice of the Peace	
1957	The Wayward Girl	Used Furniture Buyer	Uncredited
1957	The Helen Morgan Story	Jim Finney	Uncredited
1958	The Notorious Mr. Monks	Bartender	Uncredited
1958	The Case Against Brooklyn	Police Sergeant in Steam Room	Uncredited
1958	The Cry Baby Killer	John Lawson, Gambelli's Lawyer	Uncredited
1958	The Gun Runners	Freddy Baldy, Bar Proprietor	Uncredited
1958	Party Girl	Bailiff / Radio Newscaster	Voice, Uncredited
1959	These Thousand Hills	Role unknown	
1959	Plunderers of Painted Flats	Mr. Perry	
1959	Go, Johnny, Go!	Bill Barnett	
1960	Tall Story	Man in Back Seat	Uncredited
1960	The Fugitive Kind	Caliope Player	Voice, Uncredited
1960	Bells Are Ringing	Barney Lampwick, Man on Street	Uncredited
1961	The Errand Boy	Cigar Smoker in Elevator	
1961	What's My Lion?	Narrator	
1962	Period of Adjustment	Christmas Caroler	
1962	Gypsy	Announcer at Minsky's	Voice, Uncredited
1964	The Brass Bottle	Eddie	
1964	The Unsinkable Molly Brown	Denver Tour Spieler	Uncredited
1964	The Candidate	Dr. Endicott	
1964	Send Me No Flowers	TV Announcer	Uncredited
1965	That Funny Feeling	Taxi Driver	
1967	The Three Faces of Stanley		Voice
1967	Eight on the Lam	Real Estate Agent	Uncredited
1967	The Reluctant Astronaut	Dr. Bussart	Uncredited
1968	Did You Hear the One About the Traveling Saleslady?	Baggage Man	
1968	Blackbeard's Ghost	Danny Oly	Uncredited
1968	The Love Bug	Policeman on Bridge	Uncredited
1968	My Dog, the Thief	Helicopter Mechanic	
1970	Which Way to the Front?	General	Uncredited
1971	The Day of the Wolves	The Realtor	
1971	The Barefoot Executive	Fireman	Uncredited
1971	Support Your Local Gunfighter	Fat	
1972	Cancel My Reservation	Roscoe Snagby	
1973	Charlotte's Web	Lurvy	Voice
1974	How to Seduce a Woman	1st Policeman	
1974	Herbie Rides Again	Window washer	
1974	Benji	Lieutenant Samuels	
1975	Murph the Surf	Day Guard	
1976	Hawmps!	Smitty	
1976	The Shaggy D.A.	Bar Patron	
1978	Every Girl Should Have One	Ambrose	
1980	The Happy Hooker Goes Hollywood	Lab Manager	
1980	Airplane!	Reporter #2	Uncredited
1980	Getting Wasted	Mr. Kramer	
1981	First Monday in October	Justice Ambrose Quincy	
1985	Starchaser: The Legend of Orin	Hopps	Voice
1987	Amazon Women on the Moon	Agent	(segment "Reckless Youth"), (final film role)
