= Dead Man's Gulch =

1943 film by John English

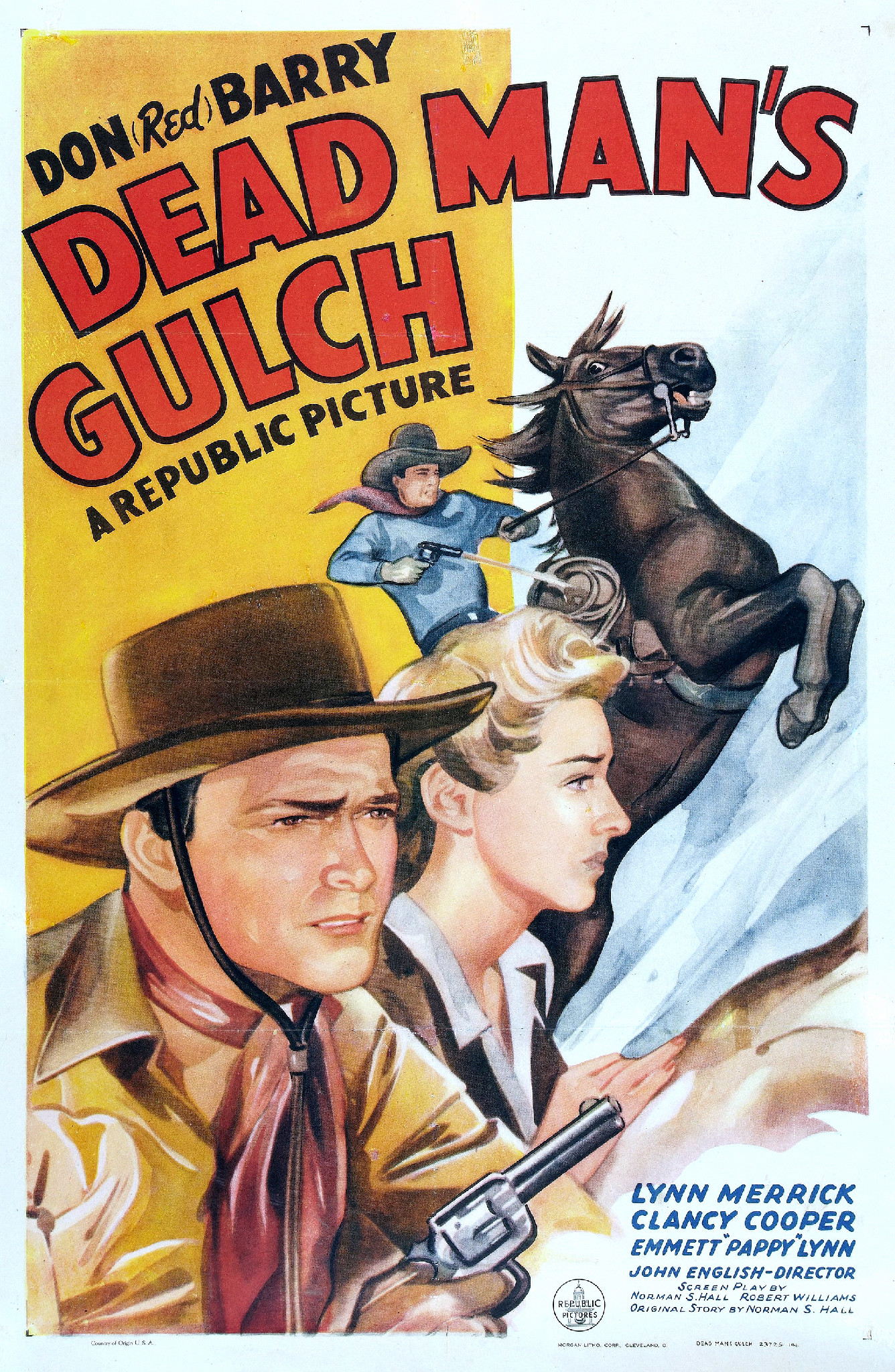
- Theatrical release poster
- Directed by: John English
- Screenplay by: Norman S. Hall; Robert Creighton Williams
- Story by: Norman S. Hall
- Produced by: Edward J. White
- Starring: Don "Red" Barry; Lynn Merrick; Clancy Cooper; Emmett Lynn; Malcolm 'Bud' McTaggart; John Vosper
- Cinematography: Ernest Miller
- Edited by: Arthur Roberts
- Music by: Mort Glickman
- Production company: Republic Pictures
- Distributed by: Republic Pictures
- Release date: February 12, 1943
- Running time: 55 minutes
- Country: United States
- Language: English

Dead Man's Gulch is a 1943 American Western film directed by John English and written by Norman S. Hall and Robert Creighton Williams. The film stars Don "Red" Barry, Lynn Merrick, Clancy Cooper, Emmett Lynn, Malcolm 'Bud' McTaggart and John Vosper. The film was released on February 12, 1943, by Republic Pictures.

== Cast ==
- Don "Red" Barry as Tennessee Colby
- Lynn Merrick as Mary Logan
- Clancy Cooper as Walt Bledsoe
- Emmett Lynn as Fiddlefoot
- Malcolm 'Bud' McTaggart as Tommy Logan
- John Vosper as Hobart Patterson
- Jack Rockwell as Marshal Bat Matson
- Pierce Lyden as Curley
- Lee Shumway as Fred Beecher
- Rex Lease as Henchman
- Al Taylor as Henchman
