= Young Jesse James =

1960 film by William F. Claxton

- Theatrical release poster
- Directed by: William F. Claxton
- Screenplay by: Orville H. Hampton; Jerry Sackheim
- Produced by: Jack Leewood
- Starring: Ray Stricklyn; Willard Parker; Merry Anders; Robert Dix; Emile Meyer; Jacklyn O'Donnell
- Cinematography: Carl Berger
- Edited by: Richard C. Meyer
- Music by: Irving Gertz
- Production company: Associated Producers
- Distributed by: 20th Century Fox
- Release date: August 2, 1960
- Running time: 73 minutes
- Country: United States
- Language: English

Young Jesse James is a 1960 American Western film directed by William F. Claxton and written by Orville H. Hampton and Jerry Sackheim. The film stars Ray Stricklyn, Willard Parker, Merry Anders, Robert Dix, Emile Meyer and Jacklyn O'Donnell. The film was released on August 2, 1960, by 20th Century Fox.

== Cast ==
- Ray Stricklyn as Jesse James
- Willard Parker as Cole Younger
- Merry Anders as Belle Starr
- Robert Dix as Frank James
- Emile Meyer as Maj. Charlie Quantrill
- Jacklyn O'Donnell as Zerelda 'Zee' Mimms
- Rayford Barnes as Pitts
- Rex Holman as Zack
- Boyd Holister as Bob Younger
- Sheila Bromley as Mrs. Samuels
- John O'Neill as Jim Younger
- Leslie Bradley as Major Clark
- Norman Leavitt as Folsom
- Lee Kendall as Jennison
- Tyler McVey as Banker
- Britt Lomond as Yankee Officer
- Ollie O'Toole as Banker
- Howard Wright as Storekeeper Jenkins
- Rod McGaughy as Raider
