= Clancy Cooper =

American actor (1906–1975)

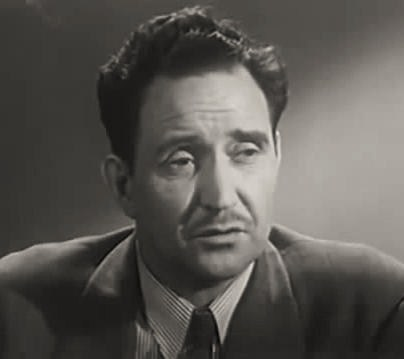
- Cooper in Girls in Chains, 1943
- Born: July 23, 1906; Boise, Idaho, U.S.
- Died: June 14, 1975 (aged 68); Hollywood, California, U.S.
- Occupation: Actor
- Years active: 1938–1972

Clancy Cooper (July 23, 1906 – June 14, 1975) was an American actor.

He appeared in more than 100 films between 1938 and 1962. He also guest-starred on numerous TV series, such as The Rifleman, Lawman, Wanted: Dead or Alive, Maverick, Gunsmoke, and Alfred Hitchcock Presents; he also appeared on Sanford and Son as Kelly, an elderly friend of Fred Sanford, in the episode "The Copper Caper", the fourth episode in the first season of the series. He appeared as the Sheriff in The Lone Ranger (TV series) 1949 episode (1/15) "Old Joe's Sister".

Cooper's Broadway credits as an actor included Eight O'Clock Tuesday (1941), Horse Fever (1940), Night Music (1940), The Man Who Killed Lincoln (1940), Summer Night (1939), Stop Press (1939), The Fabulous Invalid (1938), and Casey Jones (1938). He also directed plays.

== Selected filmography ==
- Mr. Wong, Detective (1938) - Warehouse Man (uncredited)
- Flying G-Men (1939, Serial) - Truck Driver (uncredited)
- High Sierra (1941) - Policeman George Asking for identification (uncredited)
- Double Cross (1941) - Police Radio Dispatcher (uncredited)
- They Died with Their Boots On (1941) - Train Conductor (uncredited)
- All Through the Night (1942) - Police Sergeant (uncredited)
- West of Tombstone (1942) - Dave Shurlock
- The Man Who Returned to Life (1942) - Clem Beebe
- Unseen Enemy (1942) - Police Inspector Alan Davies
- Juke Girl (1942) - Farmer in Muckeye's (uncredited)
- The Big Shot (1942) - Amos Haskell, Prison Guard (uncredited)
- Flight Lieutenant (1942) - Scanlon (uncredited)
- The Pride of the Yankees (1942) - Motorcycle Cop #1 (uncredited)
- Wings for the Eagle (1942) - Policeman at Restaurant (uncredited)
- The Secret Code (1942, Serial) - Detective Sergeant Pat Flanagan
- A Man's World (1942) - John Black
- Street of Chance (1942) - Burke
- Riding Through Nevada (1942) - Ed Kendall
- Dead Man's Gulch (1943) - Walt Bledsoe
- The Human Comedy (1943) - Mess Sergeant (uncredited)
- Redhead from Manhattan (1943) - Policeman
- Girls in Chains (1943) - Marcus
- Frontier Fury (1943) - Dan Bentley (uncredited)
- The Man from Down Under (1943) - Foreman (uncredited)
- Deerslayer (1943) - Mr. Barlow
- Whistling in Brooklyn (1943) - Police Officer Slocum (uncredited)
- Timber Queen (1944) - Barney (uncredited)
- Sundown Valley (1944) - Hodge Miller (uncredited)
- The Whistler (1944) - Telephone Repairman (uncredited)
- Gambler's Choice (1944) - Tim Riley (uncredited)
- Riding West (1944) - Blackburn
- Take It Big (1944) - Telephone Man (uncredited)
- Haunted Harbor (1944, Serial) - Yank
- The Last Ride (1944) - Police Sergeant Naylor (uncredited)
- Mystery of the River Boat (1944, Serial) - Police Sergeant (scenes deleted)
- Cyclone Prairie Rangers (1944) - Henry Vogel (uncredited)
- The Thin Man Goes Home (1944) - Butcher in Montage (uncredited)
- High Powered (1945) - Plant Boss (uncredited)
- Without Love (1945) - Sergeant
- Dangerous Partners (1945) - Ben Albee (uncredited)
- Bewitched (1945) - Cop (uncredited)
- State Fair (1945) - Policeman (uncredited)
- Mildred Pierce (1945) - Policeman (uncredited)
- Danger Signal (1945) - Police Captain with Suicide Note (uncredited)
- Sing Your Way Home (1945) - F.B.I. Man (uncredited)
- The Enchanted Forest (1945) - Gilson
- Dragonwyck (1946) - Farmer (uncredited)
- The Wife of Monte Cristo (1946) - Baptiste
- Somewhere in the Night (1946) - Tom, Sanitarium Guard (uncredited)
- Centennial Summer (1946) - Carpenter (uncredited)
- Courage of Lassie (1946) - Casey
- It Shouldn't Happen to a Dog (1946) - House Detective (uncredited)
- Below the Deadline (1946) - Nichols
- The Strange Woman (1946) - Lumberjack (uncredited)
- The Best Years of Our Lives (1946) - Taxi Driver (uncredited)
- Gallant Bess (1946) - Chief Petty Officer (uncredited)
- California (1947) - Cavalry N.C.O. (Non-Commissioned Officer) (uncredited)
- Nora Prentiss (1947) - Policeman (uncredited)
- Cheyenne (1947) - Andrews (uncredited)
- The Crimson Key (1947) - Club Doorman (uncredited)
- Deep Valley (1947) - Guard (uncredited)
- Dark Passage (1947) - Man on Street Seeking Match (uncredited)
- Unconquered (1947) - Sentry (uncredited)
- Railroaded! (1947) - Detective Jim Chubb
- Nightmare Alley (1947) - Stage Manager (uncredited)
- Her Husband's Affairs (1947) - Window Washer (uncredited)
- The Gangster (1947) - Dan, Karty's Brother-in-Law (uncredited)
- The Man from Texas (1948) - Jim Walsh, Henchman (uncredited)
- The Sainted Sisters (1948) - Cal Frisbee
- Lulu Belle (1948) - Ed, Bartender (uncredited)
- Road House (1948) - Policeman at Road House (uncredited)
- Joan of Arc (1948) - Soldier #1 (uncredited)
- Mr. Belvedere Goes to College (1949) - Mac, Police Officer #97 (uncredited)
- Reign of Terror (1949) - Saint Just's Sentry (uncredited)
- Trapped (1949) - Desk Sergeant (uncredited)
- Prison Warden (1949) - McCall, Gate Guard (uncredited)
- Song of Surrender (1949) - Mr. Torrance
- Mary Ryan, Detective (1949) - Patrolman McBride (uncredited)
- Bride for Sale (1949) - Finley (uncredited)
- Whirlpool (1949) - First Policeman (uncredited)
- Life of St. Paul Series (1949) - Blacksmith in Cyprus
- The File on Thelma Jordon (1950) - Chase (uncredited)
- Dakota Lil (1950) - Bartender
- The Great Rupert (1950) - Police Lieutenant Saunders
- Where the Sidewalk Ends (1950) - Police Desk Sergeant Murphy (uncredited)
- Convicted (1950) - Prison Guard (uncredited)
- Southside 1-1000 (1950) - Police Desk Sergeant
- He Ran All the Way (1951) - Stan
- The Tall Target (1951) - Brakeman (uncredited)
- Distant Drums (1951) - Sergeant Shane (uncredited)
- The Wild North (1952) - Sloan
- Deadline - U.S.A. (1952) - Police Captain Finlay (uncredited)
- Lydia Bailey (1952) - Codman (uncredited)
- Flat Top (1952) - Captain (uncredited)
- Because of You (1952) - Federal Agent (uncredited)
- The Man Behind the Gun (1953) - 'Kansas' Collins
- The Silver Whip (1953) - Bert Foley (uncredited)
- Pickup on South Street (1953) - Detective Eddie (uncredited)
- Here Come the Girls (1953) - Otto (uncredited)
- All the Brothers Were Valiant (1953) - Smith
- Living It Up (1954) - Newspaper Slugger (uncredited)
- Artists and Models (1955) - Police Officer (uncredited)
- The Square Jungle (1955) - Mike Walsh (uncredited)
- Somebody Up There Likes Me (1956) - Captain Lancheck (uncredited)
- The Vagabond King (1956) - Gaoler (uncredited)
- The Best Things in Life Are Free (1956) - Bootlegger (uncredited)
- The True Story of Jesse James (1957) - Sheriff Yoe (uncredited)
- Oh, Men! Oh, Women! (1957) - Mounted Policeman (uncredited)
- The Walter Winchell File (1957, Episode: "The Boy from Mason City")
- A Time to Love and a Time to Die (1958) - Sauer
- The Sheriff of Fractured Jaw (1958) - A Barber
- A Gift for Heidi (1958) - Dr. Roth
- Alfred Hitchcock Presents (1960) (Season 5 Episode 25: "The Little Man Who Was There") - Swede
- Alfred Hitchcock Presents (1960) (Season 6 Episode 13: "The Man Who Found the Money") - A.J. Meecham
- Wild Youth (1960) - Erickson
- The Silent Call (1961) - Art, Neighbor (uncredited)
- The Alfred Hitchcock Hour (1962) (Season 1 Episode 2: "Don't Look Behind You") - Police Lieutenant
- Saintly Sinners (1962) - Idaho Murphy
- Incident in an Alley (1962) - Sam, Police Sergeant
