= Saintly Sinners =

1962 film by Jean Yarbrough

- Directed by: Jean Yarbrough
- Written by: Kevin Barry
- Produced by: Robert E. Kent
- Starring: Don Beddoe; Ellen Corby; Stanley Clements; Paul Bryar
- Cinematography: Gilbert Warrenton
- Edited by: Robert Carlisle
- Music by: Richard LaSalle
- Color process: Black and white
- Production company: Harvard Productions
- Distributed by: United Artists
- Release date: February 1962
- Running time: 78 minutes
- Country: United States
- Language: English

Saintly Sinners is a 1962 American comedy-drama film directed by Jean Yarbrough and starring Don Beddoe, Ellen Corby, Stanley Clements and Paul Bryar.

== Plot ==
Ex-con Joseph Braden has his car temporarily stolen by a pair of bank robbers who hide their loot in the vehicle's spare tire. After the car is repossessed, it's sold to the kindly Rev. Daniel Sheridan, who immediately sets out on a fishing trip.

== Cast ==
- Don Beddoe as Father Dan Sheridan
- Ellen Corby as Mrs. McKenzie
- Stanley Clements as Slim
- Paul Bryar as Duke
- Addison Richards as Monsignor Craig
- Ron Hagerthy as Joe Breaden
- Jacklyn O'Donnell as Sue Braeden (as Erin O'Donnell)
- Clancy Cooper as Idaho Murphy
- William Fawcett as Horsefly Brown
- Earle Hodgins as Uncle Clete
- Norman Leavitt as Pittheus (as Norm Leavitt)
- Willis Bouchey as Police Chief Harrihan

== See also ==
- List of American films of 1962
