= Sarah Stackhouse =

American dancer (1936–2024)

Sarah Stackhouse (1936–2024; also known as Sally Stackhouse) was an American dancer, dance teacher, writer, lecturer and also notable for her staging and interpretation of the choreography of José Limón on stages worldwide.

== Life and career ==
Stackhouse was born on March 19, 1936, in Chicago. She was the younger of the two daughters of Helen Mary (Quhne) Stackhouse, a teacher, and Howard Leigh Stackhouse, a mechanical engineer for General Foods. Stackhouse started learning to dance while still at elementary school, attending the Battle Creek School of Dancing. The family moved to Scarsdale, New York where Stackhouse studied at the Steffi Nossen School of Dance. She graduated in 1954 from Scarsdale High School. On a scholarship to the American Dance Festival, Stackhouse first met Limón and also took classes from Martha Graham. She gained a bachelor's degree in dance from the University of Wisconsin in 1958. After moving to New York City, she taught dance at the New York Police Athletic League. Amongst her teachers while in New York were Merce Cunningham, Antony Tudor and Margaret Craske. She also studied Afro-Modern dance with Syvilla Fort who also taught Marlon Brando, James Dean and Eartha Kitt.

Stackhouse joined the José Limón dance company in 1958. She was principal dancer and was often partnered by Louis Falco until she left the company in 1969. She then performed with the Louis Falco ensemble, as well as with the Alvin Ailey American Dance Theater. She was a founding member of the American Dance Theater at Lincoln Center, and part of The Workgroup directed by Daniel Nagrin and the Annabelle Gamson Dance Solos, Inc. Stackhouse retained her connection to Limón working as his teaching assistant at the Juilliard School until he died in 1972. After that she continued to perform in company reunions and later reconstructed and interpreted many of the works in his repertoire.

After her marriage, she lived abroad for some years although still traveling back to New York to teach, stage and perform. She returned to the US in 1977, when she joined the faculty of the Conservatory of Dance at Purchase College, State University of New York. She served as an American cultural specialist for the Cultural Programs Division of the State Department, travelling widely, lecturing, and contributing essays to books on dance.

Her essays have appeared in the books, East Meets West in Dance: Voices in the Cross-Cultural Dialogue Eds. R and J Johnson (1995); José Limón: An Artist Re-viewed by J Dunbar (1999); and José Limón and La Malinche Ed. P Seed (2008). Her paper The Moor's Pavane: Notes on the Characters, Casting, and Scenes is included in the Labanotation score of this Limón work. Stackhouse gave teaching residencies, staged, and directed many of Limón's major works for companies in Europe, the United States, South and Central America, China, and India until 2022.

== Personal life ==
Stackhouse married Leonardo Seeber, a research scientist at the Lamont-Doherty Earth Observatory at Columbia University. They had one son, Roel, who is a professional dancer.
