= Willis Bouchey =

American actor (1907–1977)

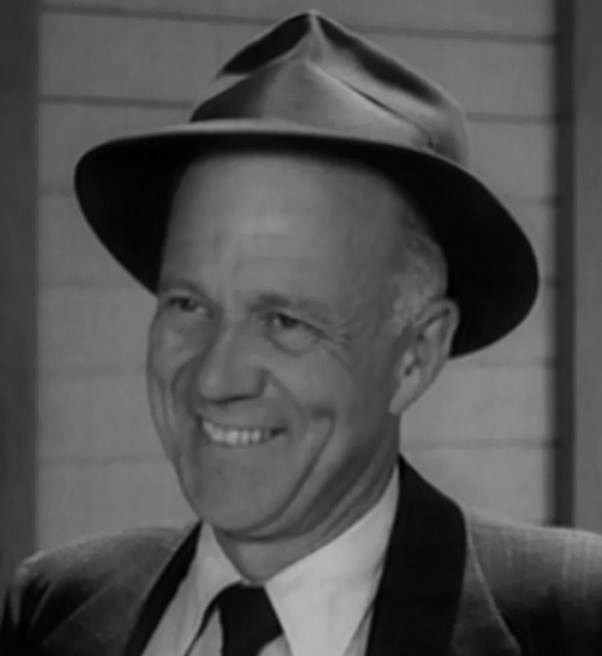
- Bouchey in Suddenly (1954)
- Born: Willis Ben Bouchey; May 24, 1907; Clare, Michigan, US
- Died: August 26, 1977 (aged 70); Burbank, California, US
- Occupation: Actor
- Years active: 1951–1972
- Spouse(s): Thelma Evelyn Marguitte (m. 1933)
- Children: 1

Willis Ben Bouchey (May 24, 1907 – September 27, 1977) was an American character actor.

Bouchey may be best known for his movie appearances in The Horse Soldiers, The Long Gray Line, Sergeant Rutledge, Two Rode Together, The Man Who Shot Liberty Valance, The Big Heat, Pickup on South Street, No Name on the Bullet, and Suddenly. He also made uncredited appearances in From Here to Eternity, How the West Was Won, Them!, Executive Suite, and A Star Is Born, and appears briefly in Frank Capra's comedy Pocketful of Miracles.

== Early years ==
Born in Clare, Michigan, on May 24, 1907, Bouchey was the son of Wilda May (née Willis) and Henry Bouchey. When his father died just six months after his birth, Willis and his mother moved in with her parents in Vernon, Michigan, and subsequently to Seattle, where Wilda raised her son with her second husband, Carl Ahlers.

Bouchey began acting as a high school student in Bakersfield, California. He went to the University of California intending to become a dentist, but left after two years because he thought he could make more money as an actor. He acted with the Bakersfield Community Theatre, sometimes as the male lead.

== Radio ==
On old-time radio, Bouchey played the title role in Captain Midnight, Charles Williams in Kitty Keene, Inc., Stanley Bartlett in Midstream, and Pa Barton in The Story of Bud Barton. He was also a member of the ensemble cast of Your Parlor Playhouse.

== Television ==
Bouchey was a member of Jack Webb's Dragnet stock company, appeared in five episodes and was billed variously as "Willis Bouchey", "William Bouchey", "Willis Buchet," or "Bill Bouchey." He appeared as a sheep trader in the title 1958 episode "Cash Robertson" of the NBC children's western series, Buckskin. In 1960 to 1961, he was cast twice in the ABC sitcom, Harrigan and Son, and four times in the role of Springer in the CBS sitcom, Pete and Gladys.

He guest starred on CBS's Dennis the Menace and played a judge in 23 episodes of that same network's Perry Mason, "one of the more frequent judges on the bench" in that program. He played Judge Neilson in "The Alfred Hitchcock Hour" S1 E4 "I Saw the Whole Thing" which aired 10/10/1962. Also on CBS, on Rod Serling's The Twilight Zone, Willis Bouchey appeared as Dr. Samuel Thorne in the episode "The Masks," which premiered March 20, 1964.

Also in 1964, he appeared on Petticoat Junction. He was Dr. John Rhone in the episode "Kate Flat on Her Back".

He also worked again with Perry Mason star Raymond Burr in an episode of NBC's Ironside. He made guest appearances on The Sheriff of Cochise (1957), The Great Gildersleeve (5 episodes), Have Gun Will Travel, Wanted: Dead or Alive (3 episodes), 77 Sunset Strip, Gunsmoke (2 episodes), Bonanza (2 episodes), Wagon Train, The Virginian (2 episodes), Crossroads; Richard Diamond, Private Detective; Daniel Boone, Laramie (5 episodes), Father Knows Best, The Danny Thomas Show, Gomer Pyle: USMC, F Troop, The Adventures of Rin Tin Tin, Lassie, Johnny Ringo, Bat Masterson, The Doris Day Show, The Untouchables, Stoney Burke, Going My Way, The Many Loves of Dobie Gillis (2 episodes),The Beverly Hillbillies (2 episodes), Dr. Kildare, The Dakotas, Hazel (5 episodes), The Mod Squad, Green Acres, The Munsters (2 episodes), McHale's Navy (3 episodes), The Andy Griffith Show (4 episodes), Get Smart, and The Alfred Hitchcock Hour (3 episodes).

On ABC's Colt .45 television series, Bouchey played Lew Wallace, the governor of New Mexico Territory, in the episode "Amnesty". Wallace offered a pardon to the bandit Billy the Kid, played on Colt .45 by Robert Conrad.

Throughout his career, Bouchey worked in twelve productions for director John Ford and was one of the more frequently-used members of Ford's stock company. In The Man Who Shot Liberty Valance, he delivered the final line, "Nothing's too good for the man who shot Liberty Valance."

== Personal life and death ==
In December 1933, Bouchey married Thelma Evelyn Marguitte. They had one child, a daughter, Christine. For well over a decade (extending from 1958 to at least 1971), Mrs. Bouchey was frequently in the news as a prominent figure in Southern California's doll collection community.

Bouchey died at age 70 on September 27, 1977, in Burbank, California.

== Selected filmography ==
- Elopement (1951) – Dr. Lucius Brenner (uncredited)
- Return of the Texan (1952) – Isham Gilder (uncredited)
- Deadline - U.S.A. (1952) – Henry (uncredited)
- Anything Can Happen (1952) – Judge Gordon (uncredited)
- Carbine Williams (1952) – Joseph Mitchell (uncredited)
- Belles on Their Toes (1952) – Kendall Williams (uncredited)
- Red Planet Mars (1952) – President
- Washington Story (1952) – Senator (uncredited)
- Don't Bother to Knock (1952) – Joe the Bartender
- Assignment – Paris! (1952) – Biddle, an Editor
- Just for You (1952) – Hank Ross
- Million Dollar Mermaid (1952) – Director
- The I Don't Care Girl (1953) – Keith Theatre Manager (uncredited)
- Destination Gobi (1953) – Capt. Gates (uncredited)
- The President's Lady (1953) – Judge McNairy (uncredited)
- Pickup on South Street (1953) – Zara
- Dangerous Crossing (1953) – Captain Peters
- Gun Belt (1953) – Endicott
- From Here to Eternity (1953) – Army Lieutenant Colonel (uncredited)
- The Affairs of Dobie Gillis (1953) – Dr. Askit – Quiz Master (uncredited)
- The Big Heat (1953) – Lt. Ted Wilks
- Executive Suite (1954) – Detective (uncredited)
- The Battle of Rogue River (1954) – Major Wallach (uncredited)
- Fireman Save My Child (1954) – Mayor
- Them! (1954) – Official at D.C. Meeting (uncredited)
- Suddenly (1954) – Dan Carney
- A Star Is Born (1954) – McBride (uncredited)
- Drum Beat (1954) – Gen. Gilliam
- The Bridges at Toko-Ri (1954) – Capt. Evans
- The Violent Men (1954) – Sheriff Martin Kenner
- The Long Gray Line (1955) – Maj. Thomas
- Battle Cry (1955) – Mr. Forrester
- Big House, U.S.A. (1955) – Robertson Lambert
- The Eternal Sea (1955) – Review Panel Chairman (Admiral Bill) (uncredited)
- I Cover the Underworld (1955) – Warden Lewis J. Johnson
- The McConnell Story (1955) – Newton Bass
- The Spoilers (1955) – Jonathan Struve
- Hell on Frisco Bay (1956) – Police Lt. Paul Neville
- Forever, Darling (1956) – Mr. Oliver Clinton
- Magnificent Roughnecks (1956) – Ernie Biggers
- Johnny Concho (1956) – Sheriff Henderson
- Pillars of the Sky (1956) – Col. Edson Stedlow
- The Wings of Eagles (1957) – Barton
- The Night Runner (1957) – Loren Mayes
- Last of the Badmen (1957) – Marshall Parker
- Mister Cory (1957) – Mr. Vollard
- The Garment Jungle (1957) – Dave Bronson
- Beau James (1957) – Arthur Julian
- The Last Stagecoach West (1957) – George Bryceson
- Zero Hour! (1957) – British Army Doctor
- Darby's Rangers (1958) – Brig. Gen. Truscott
- The Sheepman (1958) – Frank Payton
- The Last Hurrah (1958) – Roger Sugrue
- No Name on the Bullet (1959) – Buck Hastings
- The Horse Soldiers (1959) – Col. Phil Secord
- It Started with a Kiss (1959) – Officer at Airport (voice, uncredited)
- Sergeant Rutledge (1960) – Col. Otis Fosgate
- Five Guns to Tombstone (1960) – George Landon
- Two Rode Together (1961) – Mr. Harry J. Wringle
- You Have to Run Fast (1961) – Col. Maitland
- Pocketful of Miracles (1961) – Newspaper Editor
- Saintly Sinners (1962) – Police Chief Harrihan
- The Man Who Shot Liberty Valance (1962) – Jason Tully – Conductor
- Incident in an Alley (1962) – Police Capt. Tom Brady
- Panic in Year Zero! (1962) – Dr. Powell Strong
- How the West Was Won (1962) – Surgeon (uncredited)
- The Alfred Hitchcock Hour (1962) (Season 1 Episode 4: "I Saw the Whole Thing") – Judge Neilson
- The Alfred Hitchcock Hour (1963) (Season 1 Episode 20: "The Paragon") – Mr. Norton
- Cheyenne Autumn (1964) – Colonel at Victory Cave (uncredited)
- Where Love Has Gone (1964) – Judge Murphy
- The Alfred Hitchcock Hour (1965) (Season 3 Episode 16: "One of the Family") – Dr. Bailey
- McHale's Navy Joins the Air Force (1965) – Adm. Doyle
- Follow Me, Boys! (1966) – Judge (uncredited)
- Return of the Gunfighter (1967) – Judge Ellis
- Support Your Local Sheriff! (1969) – Thomas Devery
- The Love God? (1969) – Judge Jeremiah Claypool
- Young Billy Young (1969) – Doc Cushman
- Dirty Dingus Magee (1970) – Ira Teasdale
- Support Your Local Gunfighter (1971) – McLaglen
- Shoot Out (1971) – Stationmaster (uncredited)
