= David Tebet =

American theater publicist, network executive and press agent

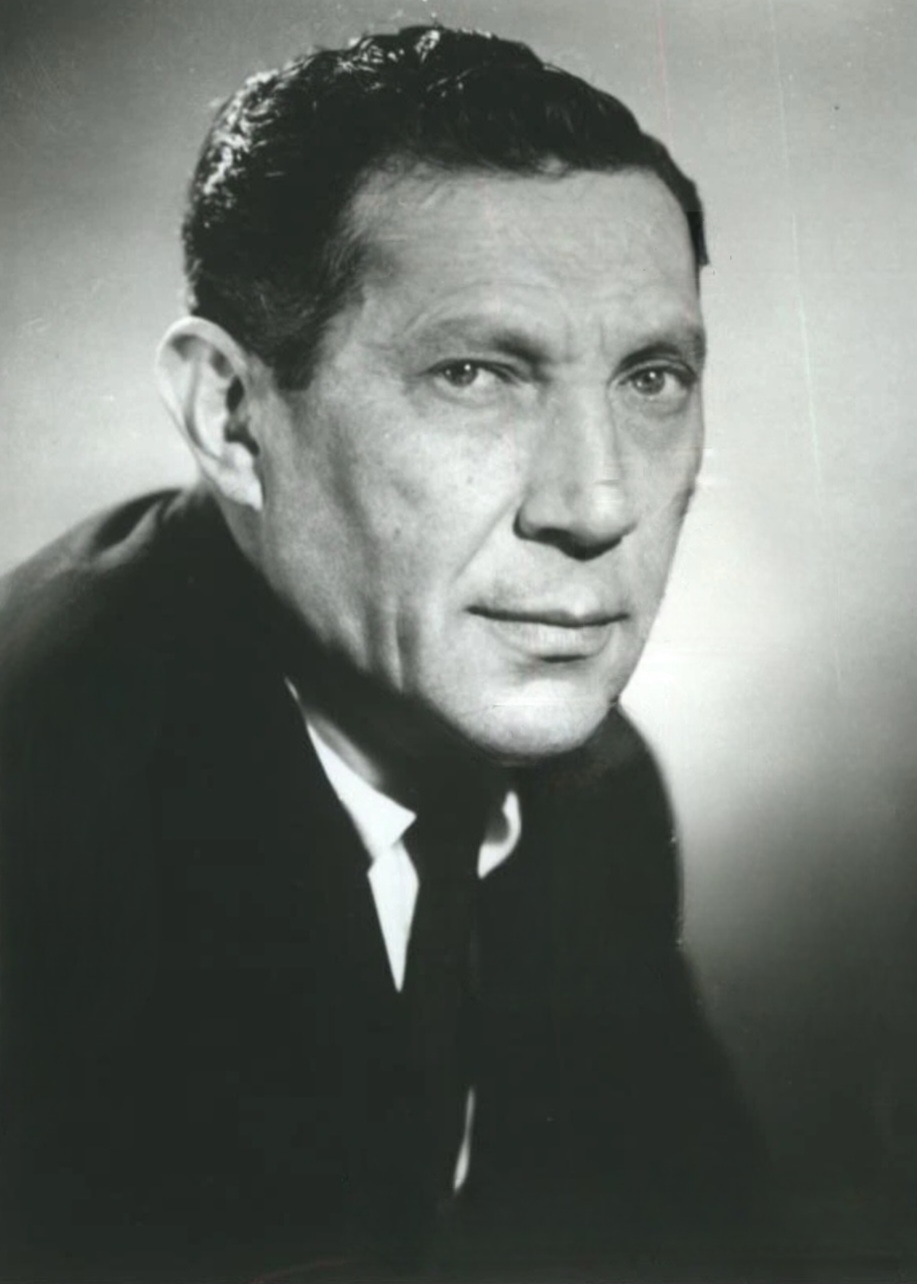
- Tebet in 1972
- Born: December 27, 1913; Atlanta, Georgia, U.S.
- Died: June 7, 2005 (aged 91); Coronado, California, U.S.
- Occupation(s): Network executive, press agent, theater publicist
- Years active: 1950–1992
- Spouse: Nanette Fabray (m. 1947; div. 1951)

David William Tebet (December 27, 1913 – June 7, 2005) was an American theater publicist, network executive and, early in his career, a press agent for Your Show of Shows starring Sid Caesar.

After the end of Your Show of Shows, Tebet became the vice president of talent relations for the National Broadcasting Company. In his job title, Tebet was responsible for recruiting potential stars to NBC and once getting them there, Tebet then held the responsibility for not only keeping the talent with the network, but also keeping the talent “relatively pleased” with the network during their respective tenures.

Tebet was responsible for the recruitment of Johnny Carson to The Tonight Show in 1962 and keeping him with the network for 30 years. Along with Carson, Tebet was also responsible for the recruitment of Michael Landon, James Garner, Dean Martin and Redd Foxx to the NBC television network.

== Early life and early career ==
Tebet was born on December 27, 1913, in Atlanta, Georgia, the son of Ukrainian Jewish immigrants Joshua (born Jeschye Tabissinov in Kitay-gorod, Lypovets, Kiev Governorate) and Edith (née Eda Dechovitz). Most of his childhood, however, was spent in Philadelphia, Pennsylvania.

His earliest jobs were part-time working as a theater usher for the former Shubert Theatre in Philadelphia. Tebet majored in journalism and graduated from Temple University. Soon after, Tebet moved to New York where he became a publicist on Broadway. In 1950, Tebet got his first major job handling publicity for NBC's new variety program Your Show of Shows which starred comedians Sid Caesar and Imogene Coca. He also helped handle talent for the show's producer, Max Liebman.

== Career at NBC ==
In 1956, Tebet joined NBC as a programming executive and was soon made vice president for talent relations, a job, he boasted, that made him "the only person in this company without a job description." During his first few years at NBC, Tebet recruited George Burns to the network after he finished his eight years on CBS's The George Burns and Gracie Allen Show.

Tebet was responsible for recruiting Johnny Carson to fill Jack Paar's position as host of The Tonight Show. Paar departed from The Tonight Show in 1962. At that time Carson was host of the Goodson-Todman daytime game show Who Do You Trust?. Tebet was watching the game show and saw Carson. Impressed with his hosting style, Tebet approached Carson who, reluctantly, agreed to host The Tonight Show. However, Carson could not immediately start his new job as he still had 26 weeks left on his contract with ABC. Tebet scheduled a series of guest hosts on the program until Carson took over hosting duties in October 1962.

Over the next decade, Tebet met the accommodations of Bob Hope and lured Dean Martin, James Garner, O. J. Simpson and Redd Foxx to NBC. After nearly 20 years of working in talent relations, Tebet resigned from the network in 1979.

== After NBC and personal life ==
After Tebet left NBC, Carson founded Carson Productions and Tebet became vice president of the company. Tebet left Carson Productions in 1993.

Tebet's sole marriage was to stage and television actress Nanette Fabray. They were wed in 1947 and divorced in 1951.

Tebet was said to be the inspiration for Felix Unger, the fastidious divorcé in Neil Simon’s The Odd Couple. The slovenly Oscar Madison was reportedly based on Tebet's onetime roommate, songwriter Sammy Cahn. Tebet was also writer Paddy Chayefsky’s model for Max Schumacher, the level-headed television executive played by William Holden in the movie Network.

For his contributions to television, Tebet was granted the medallion for distinguished service by the National Academy of Television Arts and Sciences. He was also a lifetime member of the board of governors of the New York Friars Club alongside Frank and Barbara Sinatra.

He is portrayed by Willem Dafoe in the 2024 film Saturday Night.

== Death ==
Tebet died on June 7, 2005, due to complications of a recent stroke. He was 91.
