= Flower Hujer =

- Born: September 30, 1907; Hollywood, California, U.S.
- Died: May 1, 1999 (aged 91); Queens, New York City, New York, U.S.
- Occupations: Dancer, choreographer
- Years active: 1940 - 1990

Flower Hujer (September 30, 1907 – May 1, 1999) was an American dancer and modern dance choreographer.

== Life and career ==
Flower Hujer was born in Hollywood. She studied ballet under Theodore Kosloff and began her dance career in ballet and films on the West Coast. She moved to Manhattan in the early 1940s, where she performed in Broadway musicals including Jackpot and By Jupiter, and also toured the United States in musical theater productions.

Hujer formed the Flower Hujer Dance Theater in 1949 and began to create works based on religious and nature themes which were noted for their dignity and simplicity. She also created works for musical theater. Noted dancer and choreographer Louis Falco danced in her company in the 1960s. Hujer continued to appear onstage until 1990. She died at the age of 92 in Queens, New York.
