= Nanette Fabray =

American actress, singer and dancer (1920–2018)

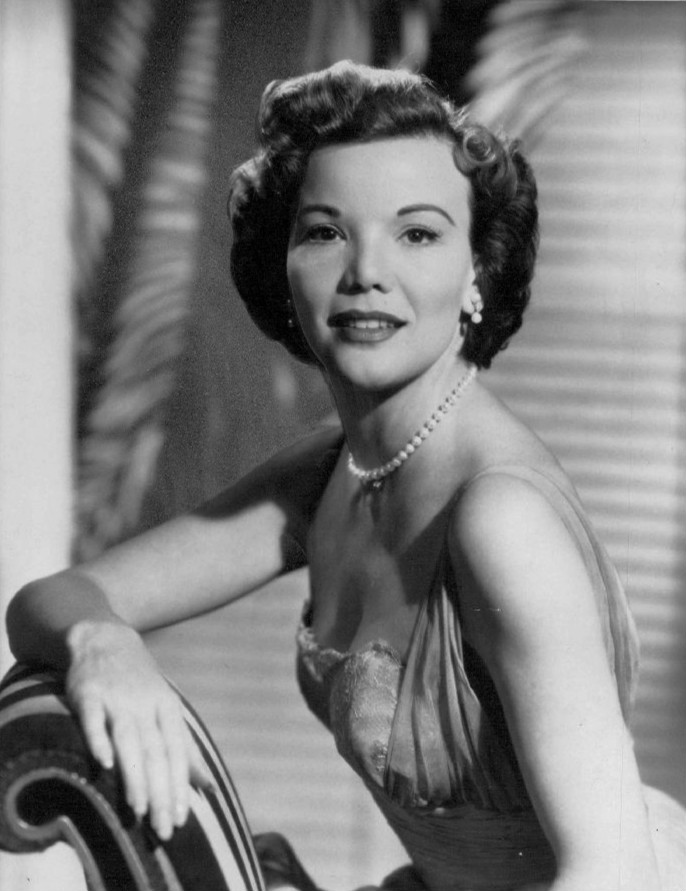
- Fabray in 1963
- Born: Ruby Bernadette Nanette Theresa Fabares; October 27, 1920; San Diego, California, U.S.
- Died: February 22, 2018 (aged 97); Palos Verdes, California, U.S.
- Occupations: Actress; singer; dancer
- Years active: 1924–2007
- Spouses: David Tebet (m. 1947; div. 1951) Ranald MacDougall (m. 1957; died 1973)
- Children: 1
- Relatives: Shelley Fabares (niece)

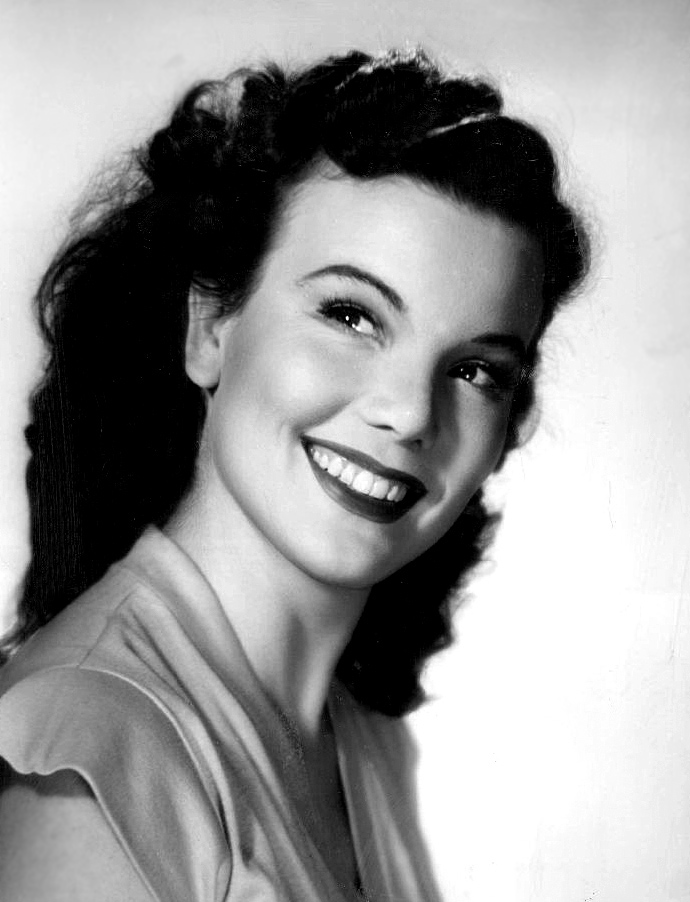
Fabray in 1950

Nanette Fabray (born Ruby Bernadette Nanette Theresa Fabares; October 27, 1920 – February 22, 2018) was an American actress, singer and dancer. She began her career performing in vaudeville as a child and became a musical-theatre actress during the 1940s and 1950s, acclaimed for her role in High Button Shoes (1947) and winning a Tony Award in 1949 for her performance in Love Life. In the mid-1950s, she served as Sid Caesar's comic partner on Caesar's Hour, for which she won three Emmy Awards, and appeared with Fred Astaire in the film musical The Band Wagon. From 1979 to 1984, she played Katherine Romano, the mother of lead character Ann Romano, on the TV series One Day at a Time. She also appeared as the mother of Christine Armstrong (played by her niece Shelley Fabares) in the television series Coach.

Fabray had significant hearing impairment and was a longtime advocate for the rights of the deaf and hearing-impaired people. Her honors included the President's Distinguished Service Award and the Eleanor Roosevelt Humanitarian Award.

== Early life ==
Fabray was born Ruby Bernadette Nanette Theresa Fabares on October 27, 1920, in San Diego, California to Lily Agnes (née McGovern), a housewife, and Raoul Bernard Fabares, a train conductor.

She used one of her middle names, Nanette, as her first name in honor of a beloved aunt from San Diego named Nanette. Throughout life, she often used the nickname Nan. Her family resided in Los Angeles, and Fabray's mother was instrumental in introducing her to show business as a child. At a young age, she studied tap dance with, among others, Bill "Bojangles" Robinson. She made her professional stage debut as Miss New Year's Eve 1923 at the Million Dollar Theater at the age of three. She spent much of her childhood appearing in vaudeville productions as a dancer and singer under the name Baby Nan. She appeared with stars such as Ben Turpin.

Despite her mother's influence, Fabray was not interested in show business as a young girl. Consequently, as an adult she did not believe in pushing children into performing at a young age. However, because of her early dance training, Fabray considered herself to be primarily a tap dancer. Despite a persistent rumor, she was never a regular or recurring guest in the Our Gang series, but she did appear as an extra during a party scene.

Fabray's parents divorced when she was nine, but they continued living together for financial reasons. During the Great Depression, her mother converted their home into a boarding house, which Fabray and her siblings helped to run, and her main job was ironing clothes. In her early teenage years, Fabray attended the Max Reinhardt School of the Theatre on a scholarship. She then attended Hollywood High School, participating in the drama program and graduating in 1939. She bested classmate Alexis Smith for the lead in the school play during her senior year. Fabray entered Los Angeles Junior College in the fall of 1939, but she did not fare well and withdrew a few months later.

Fabray experienced difficulty in school because of an undiagnosed hearing impairment. She was later diagnosed with conductive hearing loss related to congenital, progressive otosclerosis in her twenties after an acting teacher encouraged her to have her hearing tested. Fabray said of the experience, "It was a revelation to me. All these years I had thought I was stupid, but in reality, I just had a hearing problem."

== Career ==
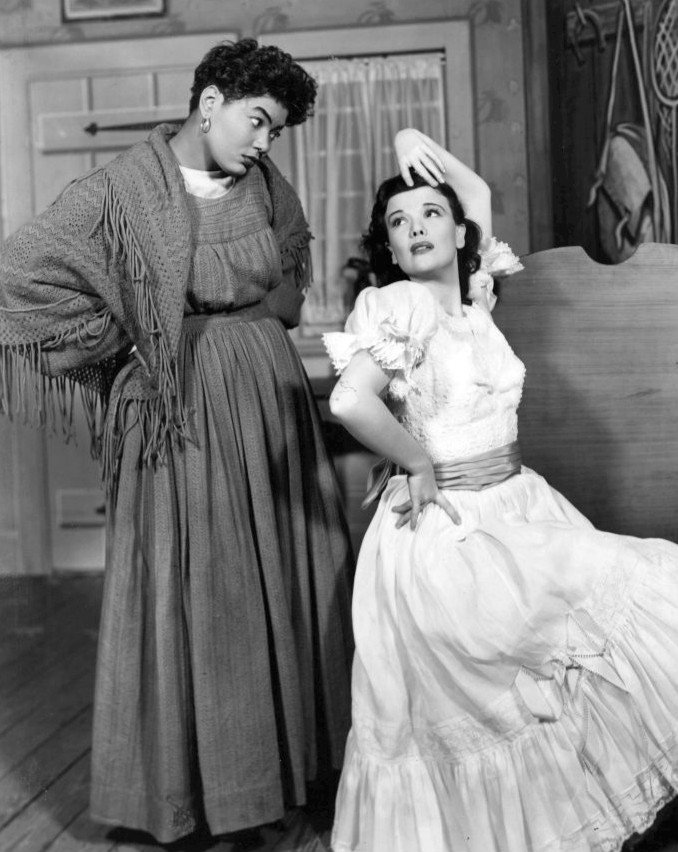
Pearl Bailey and Nanette Fabray in the Broadway musical Arms and the Girl (1950)

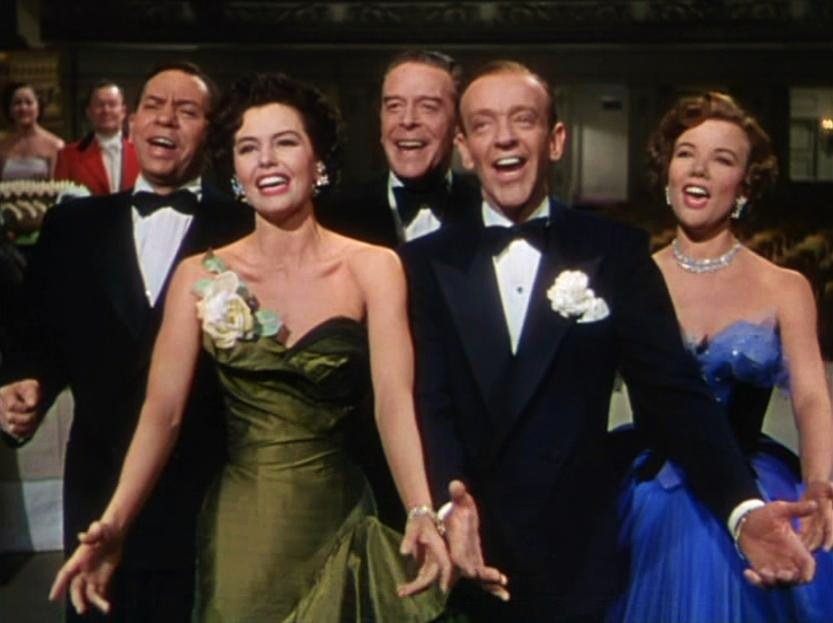
The cast of The Band Wagon (1953) L–R: Oscar Levant, Cyd Charisse, Jack Buchanan, Fred Astaire, and Nanette Fabray

=== Theatre ===
At the age of 19, Fabray made her feature-film debut as one of Bette Davis's ladies-in-waiting in The Private Lives of Elizabeth and Essex (1939). She appeared in two additional films that year for Warner Bros., The Monroe Doctrine (short) and A Child Is Born, but was not signed to a long-term studio contract. She next appeared in the stage production Meet the People in Los Angeles in 1940, which then toured the United States in 1940–1941. In the show, she sang the opera aria "Caro nome" from Giuseppe Verdi's Rigoletto while tap dancing. During the show's New York run, Fabray was invited to perform the "Caro nome" number for a benefit at Madison Square Garden with Eleanor Roosevelt as the main speaker. Ed Sullivan was the master of ceremonies for the event and mispronounced her name, prompting her to subsequently change the spelling of her name from Fabares to the more easily pronounced Fabray.

Artur Rodziński, conductor of the New York Philharmonic, saw Fabray's performance in Meet the People and offered to sponsor operatic vocal training for her at the Juilliard School. She studied opera at Juilliard with Lucia Dunham in 1941 while performing in her first Broadway musical, Cole Porter's Let's Face It!, with Danny Kaye and Eve Arden. However, as she preferred performing in musical theatre over opera, she withdrew from the school after about five months. She became a successful musical-theatre actress in New York during the 1940s and early 1950s, starring in such productions as By Jupiter (1942), My Dear Public (1943), Jackpot (1944), Bloomer Girl (1946), High Button Shoes (1947), Arms and the Girl (1950) and Make a Wish (1951). In 1949, she won the Tony Award for Best Actress in a Musical for her portrayal of Susan Cooper in the Kurt Weill/Alan Jay Lerner musical Love Life. She received a Tony nomination for her role as Nell Henderson in Mr. President in 1963 after an 11-year absence from the New York stage. Fabray continued to tour in musicals for many years, appearing in such shows as Wonderful Town and No, No, Nanette.

=== Television and film ===
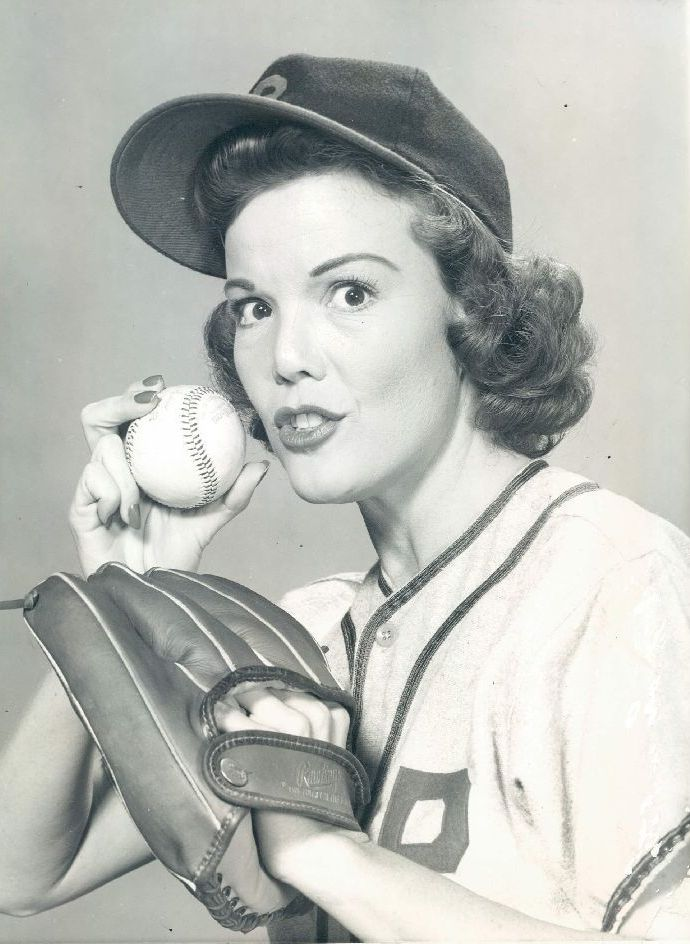
Fabray in 1957

In the mid-1940s, Fabray worked regularly for NBC on a variety of programs in the Los Angeles area. In the late 1940s and early 1950s, she made her first high-profile national television appearances performing on a number of variety programs such as The Ed Sullivan Show, Texaco Star Theatre and The Arthur Murray Party.

She also appeared on Your Show of Shows as a guest star opposite Sid Caesar. She appeared as a regular on Caesar's Hour from 1954 to 1956, winning three Emmys. Fabray left the show after a misunderstanding when her business manager made unreasonable demands for her third-season contract. Fabray and Caesar did not reconcile until years later. In December 1956, she appeared in an episode of Playhouse 90 titled "The Family Nobody Wanted" alongside Lew Ayres and Tim Hovey.

In 1961, Fabray starred in 26 episodes of Westinghouse Playhouse, a half-hour sitcom series that also was known as The Nanette Fabray Show or Yes, Yes Nanette. The character was loosely based on herself and her life as a newlywed with new stepchildren.

Fabray appeared as the mother of the main character in several television series such as One Day at a Time, The Mary Tyler Moore Show and Coach, in which she played mother to real-life niece Shelley Fabares. (Fabares also appeared as an unrelated character in One Day at a Time.)

Fabray made 13 guest appearances on The Carol Burnett Show. She performed on multiple episodes of The Dean Martin Show, The Hollywood Palace, Perry Como's Kraft Music Hall and The Andy Williams Show. She was a panelist on 230 episodes of the long-running game show The Hollywood Squares, a mystery guest on What's My Line?, and later a panelist on Match Game in 1973. Other recurring game-show appearances included participation in Password; I've Got a Secret; He Said, She Said; Celebrity Bowling; Stump the Stars; Let's Make a Deal; All Star Secrets; and Family Feud.

She appeared in guest-starring roles on Burke's Law; Love, American Style; Maude; The Love Boat; and Murder, She Wrote. During the PBS program Pioneers of Television: Sitcoms, Mary Tyler Moore credited Fabray with inspiring her trademark comedic crying technique. In 1986, Fabray was cast in the pilot episode of the unsold TBS sitcom project Here to Stay.

In 1953, Fabray played her best-known screen role as a Betty Comden-like playwright in the MGM musical comedy The Band Wagon, performing in, among others, the musical numbers "That's Entertainment" and "Louisiana Hayride"; and in "Triplets" which was also included in That's Entertainment, Part II. Fabray's additional film credits include The Happy Ending (1969), Harper Valley PTA (1978) and Amy (1981).

Fabray's final work occurred in 2007 when she appeared in The Damsel Dialogues, a musical revue at the Whitefire Theatre in Sherman Oaks, California.

== Personal life ==
Fabray's first husband, David Tebet, was in television marketing and talent and later became a vice president at NBC. According to Fabray, their marriage ended in divorce partially because of her depression, anxiety and insecurity related to her worsening hearing loss. Her second husband was screenwriter Ranald MacDougall, whose writing credits include Mildred Pierce and Cleopatra and who served as president of the Writers Guild of America in the early 1970s, They were married from 1957 until MacDougall's death in 1973 and had one son together, Jamie MacDougall.

Fabray lived in Pacific Palisades, California, and was the aunt of singer/actress Shelley Fabares. Her niece's 1984 wedding to M*A*S*H actor Mike Farrell was held at her home. Fabray was associated with her longtime neighbor Ronald Reagan's campaign for the governorship of California in 1966.

She was hospitalized for almost two weeks after being rendered unconscious by a falling pipe backstage during a live broadcast of Caesar's Hour in 1955. The audience in the studio heard her screams and Sid Caesar had at first been told that she had been killed in the freak accident. Fabray suffered a serious concussion along with associated temporary vision impairment and photosensitivity/photophobia. Later, she realized that she had avoided being directly impaled because she was bending down rather than standing straight at the time of the accident. In 1978, during the filming of Harper Valley PTA, Fabray suffered a second major concussion after falling, hitting her neck on the sidewalk and the back of her head on a rock. The accident was caused when a live elephant appearing in the film stampeded when it was spooked by a drunken bystander. Fabray developed associated memory loss and visual issues such as nystagmus but had to finish her scenes, including one involving a car chase. She was closely directed, coached, and fed lines as she could not remember her lines or cues as a result of the concussion. She was filmed from specific angles to hide the abnormal eye movements that the concussion had temporarily caused.

== Activism ==
A longtime activist of hearing awareness and support of the deaf, she sat on boards and spoke at many related functions. Also a proponent of Total Communication and teaching the deaf language and communication in any way possible, including American Sign Language and not just the oralism method of the time, Fabray was one of, if not the first, to use sign language on [live] television, something which she continued to showcase on many programs on which she made appearances, including the Carol Burnett Show, Match Game '73, and I've Got a Secret. She even contributed the story line to an entire 1982 episode of One Day at a Time, which focused on hearing loss awareness and acceptance, treatment options, and sign language. Fabray appeared in a 1986 infomercial for hearing device and deafness support products for House Ear Institute. In 2001, she wrote to advice columnist Dear Abby to decry the loud background music played on television programs. A founding member of the National Captioning Institute, she also was one of the first big names to bring awareness to the need for media closed-captioning.

Likewise, after the passing of her second husband, Randy MacDougall, Fabray also started to learn about the tribulations associated with spousal death and began to bring awareness to the need for changes in the law for widows and widowers. She focused her later years on campaigning for widows' rights, particularly pertaining to women's inheritance laws, taxes, and asset protection.

== Death ==
Fabray died on February 22, 2018, at the Canterbury nursing home in California at the age of 97 from natural causes. She was cremated at Holy Cross Cemetery, Culver City in its crematory. Her urn was buried next to her second husband, Ranald MacDougall, afterwards.

== Honors ==
A Tony and three-time Primetime Emmy award winner, Fabray has a star on the Hollywood Walk of Fame. In 1986, she received a Life Achievement award from the Screen Actors Guild.

She won a Golden Apple Award from the Hollywood Women's Press Club in 1960 along with Janet Leigh for being a Most Cooperative actress.

She was awarded the President's Distinguished Service Award and the Eleanor Roosevelt Humanitarian Award for her long efforts on behalf of the deaf and hard-of-hearing.

== Partial filmography ==
=== Film ===
Year	Title	Role	Notes
1927	Heebee Jeebees	Child at Society Party (uncredited)	Short
1939	The Private Lives of Elizabeth and Essex	Mistress Margaret Radcliffe	as Nanette Fabares
1939	A Child Is Born	Gladys Norton	as Nanette Fabares
1939	The Monroe Doctrine	Rosita De La Torre	Short as Nanette Fabares
1953	The Band Wagon	Lily Marton	
1960	The Subterraneans	Society Woman	Uncredited
1969	The Happy Ending	Agnes	
1970	The Cockeyed Cowboys of Calico County	Sadie	
1978	Harper Valley PTA	Alice Finley	
1981	Amy	Malvina	
1989	The McFalls	Mildred McFall	also known as Personal Exemptions
1994	Teresa's Tattoo	Martha Mae	also known as Natural Selection
2003	Broadway: The Golden Age, by the Legends Who Were There	Herself	

=== Television ===
Year	Title	Role	Notes
1949	The Chevrolet Tele-Theatre		Season 1 Episode 25: "Londonderry Air"
1952	The Miracle of Our Lady of Fatima	Florinda	Unconfirmed, uncredited
1953	Omnibus	Raina Petkoff	Season 1 Episode 26: "Arms and the Man"
1954–1956	Caesar's Hour	Herself	
1956	Saturday Spectacular: High Button Shoes	Sara Longstreet (uncredited)	TV Movie
1956	Playhouse 90	Helen Doss	Season 1 Episode 12: "The Family Nobody Wanted"
1957	The Alcoa Hour	Rosemary Chase	Season 2 Episode 13: "The Original Miss Chase"
1957	The Kaiser Aluminum Hour	Josephine Evans	Season 1 Episode 21: "A Man's Game"
1959	Laramie	Essie Bright	Season 1 Episode 2: "Glory Road"
1960	Startime	Sally	Season 1 Episode 33: "The Nanette Fabray Show, or Help Me, Aphrodite"
1961	The Nanette Fabray Show	Nanette "Nan" McGovern	Series regular
1964	Burke's Law	Amanda Tribble / Rowena Coolidge	2 episodes
1965	Bob Hope Presents the Chrysler Theatre	Hannah King	Season 2 Episode 18: "In Any Language"
1966	Alice Through the Looking Glass	The White Queen	TV Movie
1966	Fame Is the Name of the Game	Pat	TV Movie
1967	The Girl from U.N.C.L.E.	Desiree	Season 1 Episode 24: "The Petit Prix Affair"
1967	NBC Experiment in Television	Narrator (voice)	Season 1 Episode 6: "Theater of the Deaf"
1967	The Jerry Lewis Show	Sgt. Muldoon	Season 1 Episode 3: "Nanette Fabray, Al Hirt"
1967–1972	The Carol Burnett Show	Herself	13 episodes
1968–1972	Laugh-In	Guest Performer	3 episodes
1970	George M!	Helen Costigan 'Nellie' Cohan	TV Movie
1970	Howdy		TV Movie
1970	But I Don't Want to Get Married!	Mrs. Vale	TV Movie
1970–1973	Love, American Style	Phyllis / Cindy / Casey / Helen	4 episodes
1972	Magic Carpet	Virginia Wolfe	TV Movie
1972	The Couple Takes a Wife	Marion Randolph	TV Movie
1972	The Mary Tyler Moore Show	Dottie Richards	2 episodes
1974	Happy Anniversary and Goodbye	Fay	TV Movie
1977	Maude	Katie Malloy	Season 5 Episode 18: "Maude's Reunion"
1978–1981	The Love Boat	Mitzy Monroe / Maggie O'Brian / Shirley Simpson	3 episodes
1979	The Man in the Santa Claus Suit	Dora Dayton	TV Movie
1979–1984	One Day at a Time	Grandma Katherine Romano	46 episodes (Recurring role)
1981	Aloha Paradise		Season 1 Episode 2: "The Star/The Trouble with Chester/Fran's Worst Friend"
1983–1986	Hotel	Harriet Gold / Maggie Lewis	2 episodes
1986	Here to Stay	Aunt Elizabeth	Sitcom Pilot (Unaired)
1989	The Munsters Today	Dottie	Season 1 Episode 13: "Computer Mating"
1990–1994	Coach	Mildred Armstrong	3 episodes
1991	Murder, She Wrote	Emmaline Bristow	Season 7 Episode 16: "From the Horse's Mouth"
1993	The Golden Palace	Fern	Season 1 Episode 13: "Rose and Fern"

== Stage work ==
- The Miracle (1939)
- Six Characters in Search of an Author (1939)
- The Servant of Two Masters (1939)
- Meet the People (1940)
- Let's Face It! (1941)
- By Jupiter (1942) (replacement for Constance Moore)
- My Dear Public (1943)
- Jackpot (1944)
- Bloomer Girl (1945; 1947; 1949)
- High Button Shoes (1947)
- Love Life (1948)
- Arms and the Girl (1950)
- Make a Wish (1951)
- Mr. President (1962)
- No Hard Feelings (1973)
- Applause (1973)
- Plaza Suite (1975)
- Wonderful Town (1975)
- The Secret Affairs of Mildred Wild (1977)
- Call Me Madam (1979)
- Cactus Flower (1984)
- Prince of Central Park (1989) (replacement for Jo Anne Worley)
- The Bermuda Avenue Triangle (1997)
