= Sombrero Playhouse =

Regional theatre from 1949 to 1982

- Interactive map of Sombrero Playhouse
- Address: 4747 North Seventh Street; Phoenix, Arizona; United States of America
- Owner: Richard Charlton
- Operator: Sombrero Playhouse Corporation
- Capacity: 550
- Type: Regional Theater

Construction
- Groundbreaking: February 22, 1949
- Opened: March 29, 1949
- Closed: 1981
- Demolished: 1982
- Cost: $100,000 (1949)
- General contractor: Allison Steel Manufacturing Company

The Sombrero Playhouse was a regional theatre in Phoenix, Arizona. It was built in March 1949, the first legitimate professional theater in Phoenix, though the city did have a long tradition of Little Theater. Major Broadway and Hollywood stars of the time performed on stage at the Sombrero, including Katharine Cornell, Helen Hayes, Kirk Douglas, Milton Berle, Billie Burke, Burgess Meredith, Walter Pidgeon, Tom Drake, Vincent Price, and Mary Astor. Despite its limited capacity, it was one of the most widely-known regional theaters in the Western United States during the 1950s and early 1960s. It presented recent Broadway hits (sometimes while they were still playing there), revivals, and on several occasions original productions that then went on national tour.

After 20 seasons of presenting plays, the Sombrero "went dark" after the 1968 season, became an art film house in 1976, before being sold and demolished in 1982.

== Founding ==
William W. Merrill and Richard Charlton formed a partnership in June 1948 to explore the possibility of a theater in Phoenix. Merrill owned the summer stock Will-o-Way Playhouse in Birmingham, Michigan, while Charlton operated the Music Hall in Detroit. Charlton met Ann Lee at Sardi's in October 1948, where they discussed the idea of "winter stock" theater in the Southwest. She was a Texas-born Broadway actress who had founded a summer stock venue in Santa Fe, New Mexico. Merrill purchased property at 3535 East MacDowell Road in Phoenix, which held a barn that could be converted to a rustic theater. The new venue would be called Sombrero Playhouse, since it would be a western version of a "straw hat" (summer stock) theater. However, Merill lacked the funds to proceed with development.

Charlton and Lee took a long-term lease for an empty two-acre lot on Seventh Street near Camelback Road, on which a new theater would be built. He and Ann Lee formed a corporation with local notables as officers to fund the project, while he and Lee would be co-producers. Charlton went to Hollywood to recruit name talent for the opening season, while Lee persuaded the Phoenix City Council to clear scrub vegetation from the lot at no charge using city jail inmates as labor. The property actually lay outside the then city limits, but as a reporter covering the council noted, when Lee smiled none of the councilmen said "No". Ground-breaking at 4747 North Seventh Street for the $100,000 building began February 22, 1949, with the building completed in late March.

Merrill filed an injunction with Maricopa Superior Court to stop the use of the name "Sombrero Playhouse", which he had registered with the state in February 1949. Charlton countered with his own suit asking to dissolve his partnership with Merrill and for an accounting of the remaining assets. The name stayed on the theatre, which had its opening on March 29, 1949, with a performance of Born Yesterday, starring William Bendix, Audrey Totter, and Whit Bissell.

== Seasonal activities ==
=== Winter drama ===
The Sombrero's season ran from January through March. The first three seasons, plays opened on Tuesdays and closed Sundays, generally with Wednesday and Saturday afternoon matinees, for a one-week run of eight performances. Beginning with the fourth season (1953), opening night was switched to Mondays, with Saturday night the closer. This lasted two seasons then reverted to the original Tuesday thru Sunday scheme for the remainder of its performing seasons.

The first season, originally advertised as 12 weeks, was revised to five weeks due to the theater's construction, then cut to four weeks. For subsequent years, the Sombrero's season usually ran for ten weeks, with a limited engagement of one week per production. This was part of the appeal for Hollywood stars, who wanted the cachet of a stage credit but didn't want to commit to an open-ended run. Seasons in the 1950s would sometimes be extended with bonus programs.

=== Cast and crew ===
Charlton formed American Productions Inc. to provide casts and plays for the Sombrero Playhouse Corporation. Ann Lee left the Sombrero before the 1957 season to resume acting full-time. Charlton then brought in associate producers to share production tasks. Directors, set designers and other technical crew were recruited seasonally, generally from outside Arizona since the state then had few opportunities for those crafts.

Bit parts and walk-on roles were filled by local actors, drama school apprentices, and an occasional Phoenix notable. A resident group of professional actors, directors, and technical crew were hired each season to support the name stars. While the stars stayed at nearby deluxe resorts, the others were housed first at the Echo Lodge in the Camelback Inn area. Later, adobe stables just south of the theater were converted into fourteen apartments, for use by the resident actors and crew. These were rented out on nine-month leases during off-season.

=== The facility ===
The playhouse had limited clearance above the proscenium arch backstage, no more than four feet, so sets couldn't be "flown", they had to be struck for changes. Special twelve-foot flats were designed for the limited space, instead of the usual fourteen-feet. A set workshop and storage facility was built behind the Sombrero Playhouse during winter 1953–1954; prior to that sets were stored outdoors as there was no room backstage.

A $15,000 rehearsal hall addition was built after the Sombrero's application for a liquor permit triggered a dispute with the nearby Silver Spur restaurant where casts had previously rehearsed. Just prior to the 1953 winter season, the theatre floor was remodeled to replace aisle steps with smooth concrete ramps. The entire playhouse complex had air-conditioning installed two months later.

By 1959 the city limits of Phoenix had expanded to encompass the Sombrero Theatre, which was renovated and hooked up to city water and sewer lines. Acoustics remained a problem throughout the Sombrero's existence, one reason why so few musicals were booked there.

=== Subscriptions ===
From the second season subscription tickets were offered. Subscriptions carried with them membership in the Backstage Club, a small private lounge added onto the theater building in 1952. Subscriptions were available in blocks of ten performances, which could be used for any production. By 1959 the Sombrero had over a thousand subscribers, and by 1961 had nearly doubled that figure.

=== Sidelines ===
The Backstage Club was enlarged and redecorated in 1953 to include a buffet supper area and piano bar. It was expanded into a full-service restaurant and nightclub for the general public during February 1956.

A drama school, the American Foundation for Theatre Arts was established during late 1958 at the Sombrero, with free tuition for up to ten apprentices.

The Backstage Club's Galaxy room was used for original local art exhibits starting in 1959. During the 1960s this became a separate business enterprise called Galaxy Galleries.

=== Apogee ===
The Sombrero's reputation had grown with the Hollywood community, helped in part by the producers opening an office in the Los Angeles area. The New York Times ran a half-page article profiling the success of the producers in recruiting, not only for their own theater but also for Broadway productions that needed a name star in a hurry. Ronald Reagan and Nancy Davis watched ZaSu Pitts in Ramshackle Inn at the Sombrero on their honeymoon in March 1952. Frank Lloyd Wright, Clare Booth Luce, and Ethel Merman were attendees at first nights. So was then first lady Mamie Eisenhower and her sister, accompanied by the Secret Service.

The years 1959 and 1960 were the high point for the Sombrero Playhouse. Guthrie McClintic and Sol Hurok produced the world premiere of their production of Dear Liar at the Sombrero in 1959, starring Katharine Cornell and Brian Aherne, with the playwright Jerome Kilty himself directing. The following year Helen Hayes starred in The Cherry Orchard.

Several notable opera productions also appeared on the stage of the Sombrero in these years: Tonight at the Opera with Kathryn Grayson and David Poleri in 1960, and in 1961 Madame Butterfly with Maralin Niska, and Boris Godunov with Jerome Hines and John Gurney. All three productions were directed by Vladimir Rosing.

=== Later seasons ===
The Phoenix Center for the Performing Arts was launched with large newspaper ads in January 1965. This offered two subscriptions: the Broadway Series, of plays at the Sombrero, and a Carnegie Hall Series of concerts and dance at Phoenix Union High School. A local columnist reported Charlton's plans for a new performing arts complex, but it appears the only outcome was Charlton styling himself artistic director and hiring others to take over production chores at the Sombrero.

Charlton was provoked by a scorching review of the 1965 season opening, that indicted "the Sombrero attitude". Critic William J. Nazzaro took exception to the slapdash production schedule of the Sombrero:

"What we saw last night was what one should expect at a theater that operates on the star system, where the management does not know what it will present even two or three weeks before the actual event... But what really needs correction is the Sombrero's attitude that a star can be engaged at the last minute, thrown into a vehicle with limited rehearsals, and come up with a winner".

Charlton responded with a letter to the Arizona Republic editor, acknowledging problems with the opening night performance, but denying that the Sombrero production method itself was at fault. However, Nazzaro was hardly the first local critic to make these observations.

== Off-season activities ==
During the off-season the Sombrero was leased out for private and public use. The theater was used for a private children's drama group and city public theatre workshop programs during the late spring and summer, while the co-producers returned to Santa Fe to open Ann Lee's El Teatro for the summer season. During the late spring and fall first-run foreign films, sans concessions, were run. The Backstage Club was open year-round to members, and often featured entertainment and art shows.

== Last years ==
Regular stage seasons ceased on March 31, 1968, with a production of The Torch-Bearers starring Cornelia Otis Skinner, Mildred Natwick, and Joe Flynn. Thereafter the facility was used intermittently for showing films, as a summer stock workshop, and for special events. During April and May 1976 there was an attempt to revive legitimate drama with a production of Sleuth, but there was no follow-up. Summer 1976 saw the theater leased out to an art house business which showed second-run and classic films. As with many US art house cinemas at that time, it largely survived off midnight showings of The Rocky Horror Picture Show. Richard Charlton, who owned both the theater and the adjacent restaurant, tangled with the art house leasees during 1978 over access to a dirt parking lot on the premises and what Charlton characterised as "x-rated films". A Maricopa Superior Court judge ruled the ten-year lease was valid and the art house could continue showing films, but its patrons would have to park elsewhere.

Charlton filed for Chapter 11 bankruptcy in November 1980, and the theater and restaurant were purchased by AJ Properties in July 1981. The two buildings were to be demolished in favor of a multi-structure office complex. The Sombrero Theatre was torn down in 1982, with the property remaining an empty lot into 1983. Furnishings, antiques, paintings, and other artwork from the Sombrero Theatre were sold at a bankruptcy auction in November 1983.

== Productions ==
=== 1949-1958 ===
Year	Play	Director	Producer	Leading Cast and Notes
1949	Born Yesterday	Irving Sudrow	Lee/Charlton	William Bendix, Audrey Totter, Whit Bissell, Morgan Farley, Richard Bowler, Frank Marlowe
1949	The Philadelphia Story		Lee/Charlton	Ruth Hussey, Don Porter, Craig Stevens, Benay Venuta, Beverly Wills, Lee Patrick, Dan Tobin, Edgar Barrier
1949	John Loves Mary		Lee/Charlton	Guy Madison, Enrica Soma, Don Porter, Lee Patrick, Edgar Barrier, Fred Taylor, Richard Bowler, Peggy Converse.
1949	Here Today		Lee/Charlton	Ann Lee, Don Porter, Dan Tobin, Peggy Converse, Maude Wallace, Ross Elliot. Poor direction resulted in a blistering review.
1950	Light Up the Sky	Harry Ellerbe	Lee/Charlton	Jean Parker, Robert Lowery, Natalie Schafer, Roy Roberts, Carleton FitzGerald, Frances Bavier, Boyd Crawford, Tyler Rayburn, Kay Buckley
1950	The First Mrs. Fraser	Harry Ellerbe	Lee/Charlton	Jane Cowl, Reginald Mason, Ann Lee, Lewis Martin, Frances Bavier.
1950	For Love or Money	Harry Ellerbe	Lee/Charlton	John Loder, Natalie Schaffer, Sally Brophy, (Note: Her banker father Frank C. Brophy was the president of the Sombrero Playhouse Corporation. Her many credits at Sombrero had her first name as "Sallie".) Frances Bavier, Steven Meyer.
1950	You Can't Take It with You	Harry Ellerbe	Lee/Charlton	Fred Stone, Dorothy Stone, Charles Collins, Frances Bavier, Lewis Martin, Kay Buckley, Zac George, Steven Meyer.
1950	Dream Girl	Frank Ross	Lee/Charlton	Joan Caulfield, Don Porter, Hayden Rorke, Richard Webb, Frances Bavier, Kay Buckley, Lewis Martin.
1950	My Sister Eileen	Margaret Perry	Lee/Charlton	Una Merkel, Vince Barnett, Kay Buckley, Naomi Stevens, Steven Meyer.
1950	Strange Bedfellows	Margaret Perry	Lee/Charlton	Frances Bavier, Sally Brophy, Lewis Martin, Natalie Schafer, Steven Meyer, John Ong, Donnie Smelick.
1950	Harvey	Margaret Perry	Lee/Charlton	Brock Pemberton, (Note: Pemberton had produced the original Broadway production of this play. Six days after this run completed he died at home from a heart attack.) Frances Bavier, Sally Brophy, Lewis Martin, Steven Meyer, Natalie Schafer.
1950	Let Us Be Gay	Margaret Perry	Lee/Charlton	Kay Francis, Joel Ashley, Frances Bavier, Sally Brophy, Lewis Martin, Natalie Schafer.
1950	The Glass Menagerie	Margaret Perry	Lee/Charlton	Robert Walker, John Ireland, Joanne Dru, Margaret Wycherly.
1951	O Mistress Mine	Arthur Sircom	Lee/Charlton	
1951	The Barretts of Wimpole Street	Arthur Sircom	Lee/Charlton	Susan Peters
1951	Detective Story	William Schorr	Lee/Charlton	Kirk Douglas, Peggy Webber, Allen Jenkins, Sandra Gould, Tony Caruso, Sidney Miller.
1951	The Voice of the Turtle	Arthur Sircom	Lee/Charlton	Mel Ferrer, Diana Lynn, Ann Lee.
1951	Dinner at Eight	Arthur Sircom	Lee/Charlton	Cesar Romero, Helen Walker, Rhys Williams, Don Beddoe, Chick Chandler, Lela Bliss, Ruthelma Stevens, Lillian Bronson, Joan Vohs, Walter Coy, Ruth Lee.
1951	Post Road	Arthur Sircom	Lee/Charlton	ZaSu Pitts, Don Beddoe, Ruth Lee, Harris Brown, Thayer Roberts, Lynne Gray.
1951	Anything Goes	Arthur Sircom	Lee/Charlton	Benay Venuta, Fred Clark, Dick Elliott, Bert Easley, Lee Kerry, Don Kaylor, Russ Black.
1951	Made in Heaven	Arthur Sircom	Lee/Charlton	Richard Arlen, Ruth Warrick, Ruth Lee, Tookie Hunter, Thayer Roberts.
1951	Goodbye, My Fancy	Dick Irving	Lee/Charlton	Nancy Carroll, Cameron Mitchell, Ruth Lee, Rita Riggs.
1951	Sailor, Beware!	Richard Charlton	Lee/Charlton	Mickey Rooney, Tom Neal, Jimmy Cross, Thayer Roberts, Claude Stroud, Jane Nigh.
1952	Affairs of State	Demetrios Vilan	Lee/Charlton	Bonita Granville, Charles Meredith, Edgar Buchanan, Gordon Oliver, Ann Doran.
1952	A Streetcar Named Desire	Paul Guilfoyle	Lee/Charlton	Maria Palmer, Alan Dreeben, Sally Brophy.
1952	Seventh Heaven	Paul Guilfoyle	Lee/Charlton	John Ireland, Joanne Dru, Norman Budd, Alan Dreeben, Vicki Raaf.
1952	The Skin of Our Teeth	Paul Guilfoyle	Lee/Charlton	Betty Field, Cora Witherspoon, James Dobson, Jacqueline Paige, John O'Connor
1952	Season in the Sun	Paul Guilfoyle	Lee/Charlton	Nancy Kelly, Walter Coy, John O'Conner, Jacqueline Paige, Don Porter, Harris Brown, Peggy Converse, Cora Witherspoon.
1952	Come Back Little Sheba	Paul Guilfoyle	Lee/Charlton	Una Merkel, John O'Connor, Ann Chatin, Bill Amador, John Dutra, Harris Brown, John Gobias
1952	The Happy Time	George Somnes	Lee/Charlton	Reginald Gardiner, Frances Dee, (Note: Dee was unable to perform on opening night, her place was taken by resident actress Jacqueline Paige.) Maria Palmer, Lloyd Corrigan, Richard Vath, Ruth Lee, Joe E. Marks
1952	Lady in the Dark	Walter Coy; Ann Lee	Lee/Charlton	Norma Terris, Ann Lee, Walter Coy, Allan Nixon, John O'Connor, Bert Tanswell, Jacqueline Paige
1952	Ramshackle Inn	Jonathan Seymour	Lee/Charlton	ZaSu Pitts, Howard Erskine, Harris Brown, Ann Chatin, John O'Connor.
1952	The Little Foxes	Jonathan Seymour	Lee/Charlton	Ruth Chatterton, Walter Coy, Grandon Rhodes, Jacqueline Paige, Pat Wray, John Kuhl, John O'Connor, Betty Cole, Nathaniel Robinson.
1952	The Cocktail Party		Lee/Charlton	Only Vincent Price and Sally Brophy emerged unscathed. The reviewer was not pleased with other cast members, chose not to name them, but credited the prompter with having the most spoken lines on opening night.
1953	Life with Mother	Demetrios Vilan	Lee/Charlton	Billie Burke, Carl Benton Reid, Lillian Culver.
1953	The Moon Is Blue	Lester Vail	Lee/Charlton	Edward Ashley, Betty Lynn, Mark Miller
1953	Petticoat Fever	Lester Vail	Lee/Charlton	William Eythe, Anne Kimbell, Arthur Gould-Porter, Eve Miller, Nicholas Colasanto.
1953	Burlesque	Lester Vail	Lee/Charlton	Robert Lowery, Jean Parker, Edgar Buchanan, Gale Sherwood, James Warren, Jimmy Conlin, Dorothy Kane. (Note: This was the stage name for Jimmy Conlin's wife, Dorothy Ryan Conlin.)
1953	The Corn Is Green	Lester Vail	Lee/Charlton	Ann Harding, Douglas Dick, Lewis Russell, Cora Witherspoon, June Northup.
1953	Hay Fever	Lester Vail	Lee/Charlton	Miriam Hopkins, Wilton Graff, Ann Lee, Cora Witherspoon, Jacque Mercer, William Ching, George Nader.
1953	Bell, Book and Candle	Lester Vail	Lee/Charlton	Victor Jory, Teresa Wright, Douglas Dick, Cora Witherspoon, Joseph Leon.
1953	Theatre	Dennis Allen	Lee/Charlton	Kay Francis, Lester Vail, Jesslyn Fax, Dennis Allen, Rose Hobart, Chester Matshall.
1953	Private Lives	Lester Vail	Lee/Charlton	Gene Raymond, Ann Lee, Jacque Mercer, Mark Miller.
1953	Jason	Lester Vail	Lee/Charlton	Franchot Tone, Anne Kimbell, Kenneth Tobey, Cora Witherspoon, Thom Conroy, Paul Stephenson.
1954	Design for Living	John O'Shaughnessy	Lee/Charlton	Sylvia Sidney, Gene Raymond, Cora Witherspoon, William Weaver, Thayer Roberts
1954	The Women	John O'Shaughnessy	Lee/Charlton	Frances Dee, Joan Blair, Cora Witherspoon, Rose Hobart, Jean Perkinson, Lizz Slifer, Dorothy Patrick.
1954	Nina	William Weaver	Lee/Charlton	Edward Everett Horton, Ann Lee, Don Shelton, William Weaver.
1954	Suds in Your Eye	John O'Shaughnessy	Lee/Charlton	Jane Darwell, Richard Jaeckel, Nancy Hale, Kasia Orzazewski, Cora Witherspoon.
1954	In Any Language	John O'Shaughnessy	Lee/Charlton	Miriam Hopkins, Robert Lowery, George Givot, Jean Perkinson, Lynne Grey, Michael Ivor.
1954	Late Love	John O'Shaughnessy	Lee/Charlton	Mary Astor, Ted Brenner, Cora Witherspoon, William Weaver, Sally Fraser, Gerald Masterson, Sonja Niel Anderson.
1954	Mister Roberts	John O'Shaughnessy	Lee/Charlton	Don Taylor, Marshall Thompson, Barry Kelley, Lewis Martin, Del Tenney, Max Slaten, Alan Orrie, Loretta King.
1954	The Male Animal	William Weaver	Lee/Charlton	Buddy Ebsen, Robert Lowery, Kay Buckley, Del Tenney, Jack Jordan, Susie Oby, Gilbert Fallman.
1954	Goodbye Again	William Weaver	Lee/Charlton	Mercedes McCambridge, Kent Smith, Dan Tobin, Mary Lawrence, Jacque Mercer, Gerard Masterson.
1954	The Open Window (Note: This was an original performance, written by married couple Lenore Coffee and William Joyce Cowen.)	John O'Shaughnessy	Lee/Charlton	Victor Jory, Mary Anderson, Mary Wickes.
1954	Sabrina Fair	Morton DaCosta	Lee/Charlton	Diana Lynn, Wendell Corey, Estelle Winwood, Margaret Bannerman, Philip Tonge, Marshall Thompson, Lewis Martin.
1955	Oh, Men! Oh, Women!	Charles K. Freeman	Lee/Charlton	Terry Moore, Hayden Rorke, Sally Brophy, John Bryant, Jacque Mercer, James Dobson.
1955	Stalag 17	Charles K. Freeman	Lee/Charlton	Tom Drake, Hugh O'Brian, Robert Strauss, John Banner, Rudolph Anders, John Bryant.
1955	I Am a Camera	Charles K. Freeman	Lee/Charlton	John Ireland, Joanne Dru, Ann Spencer, Edit Angold, Tommy Noonan, Glaze Lohman, Riza Royce.
1955	My Three Angels	Charles K. Freeman	Lee/Charlton	Thomas Gomez, Henry Brandon, Liam Sullivan, Carl Harbord, Margaret Wells, Elinor Donahue, Lewis Martin, John Bryant.
1955	George Washington Slept Here	Charles K. Freeman	Lee/Charlton	Arthur Hunnicutt, Douglas Wood, Jim Backus, Elinor Donahue, Henny Backus, Mark Herron.
1955	Mother Was a Bachelor	Charles K. Freeman	Lee/Charlton	Billie Burke, Edgar Buchanan, Susan Seaforth, Alex J. Petrie, Tamar Cooper, Glase Lohman.
1955	Dial 'M' for Murder	Charles K. Freeman	Lee/Charlton	Douglass Montgomery, Lloyd Bridges, Maria Palmer, Sean McClory, Wilton Graff, Keith Donaldson.
1955	The Fourposter	Charles K. Freeman	Lee/Charlton	Constance Bennett, Tod Andrews.
1955	The Caine Mutiny Court-Martial	Charles K. Freeman	Lee/Charlton	Steve Brodie, Paul Stewart, Wendell Corey, Robert Anderson, Fay Roope, Gerald Masterson.
1955	Picnic	Charles K. Freeman	Lee/Charlton	Scott Brady, Georgiana Carter, Elinor Donahue, Alice Drake, Cora Witherspoon, Carol Hill, Howard Bevans.
1955	Liliom	Benno Schneider	Lee/Charlton	Arlene Dahl, Fernando Lamas, Benay Venuta, Cora Witherspoon, Jay Novello.
1956	No Time for Comedy	Robert E. Perry	Lee/Charlton	Sarah Churchill, Oliver Cliff, Katharine Bard, Hayden Rorke, Susie Oby, Richard Lupino, Richard Curley.
1956	The Solid Gold Cadillac	Robert E. Perry	Lee/Charlton	ZaSu Pitts, Roy Roberts, Hayden Rorke, Oliver Cliff, John Marchal, Burt Mustin, June Taylor, Meredith Harless, Ethel Hinton.
1956	The Fifth Season	Robert E. Perry	Lee/Charlton	Leo Fuchs, Oliver Cliff, Sara Shane, Jody McCrea, Jacque Mercer, Ann Spencer, Mary Lawrence, Robert E. Perry, Philip Moore.
1956	The White Sheep of the Family	Robert E. Perry	Lee/Charlton	Edward Everett Horton, Laura La Plante, Jane Urban, Oliver Cliff, Ann Spencer, Sara Shane, Philip Moore, Bill Hughes, Michael Ivor.
1956	A Room Full of Roses	Robert E. Perry	Lee/Charlton	Linda Darnell, Ann Lee, Gayle Ann Edlund, Oliver Cliff, Barry Truex, Joanne Goldwater, William Hughes, Maidie Norman.
1956	Anastasia	Robert E. Perry	Lee/Charlton	Joanne Dru, John Ireland, Oliver Cliff, John Banner, Blanche Yurka, (Note: During one of her performances Yurka suffered a heart attack on stage. She recovered and was released from hospital two weeks later.) William Hughes.
1956	The Seven Year Itch	Don Taylor	Lee/Charlton	Anne Kimball, Don Taylor, Oliver Cliff, Dan Harden, Anne Merryweather, Milou McNamera.
1956	Jenny Kissed Me	Robert E. Perry	Lee/Charlton	Rudy Vallée, Maudie Prickett, Eilene Janssen, Oliver Cliff, Leonard Shoemaker, Lucille B. Smith, Michael West.
1956	The Rainmaker	Robert E. Perry	Lee/Charlton	Tom Drake, Sally Brophy, James Dobson.
1956	Too Many Husbands	Robert E. Perry	Lee/Charlton	Ann Lee, Phillip Reed, Oliver Cliff, Douglas Wood, Shirley Massey, Helene Haigh, Adele Neff, Leonard Carey.
1956	The Desk Set	William Spier	Lee/Charlton	June Havoc, Lee Patrick, Edna Skinner, Oliver Cliff, Don Shelton, Loretta King, Philip Moore.
1957	The Little Hut	Robert E. Perry	Richard Charlton	Leon Ames, Joan Tetzel, Oliver Cliff.
1957	The Sleeping Prince	Robert E. Perry	Richard Charlton	Hermione Gingold, Francis Lederer, Ann Kimball, Richard Striker, David Lewis, Barbara Morrison, Hilda Plowright, Luana Anders.
1957	Tiger at the Gates	Harold Kennedy	Richard Charlton	Robert Ryan, John Ireland, Marilyn Erskine, Ray Danton, Mary Astor, Howard Wendell, Peg LaCentra, Marianne Stewart, Milton Parsons.
1957	Anniversary Waltz	Robert E. Perry	Richard Charlton	Sylvia Sidney, Oliver Cliff, Robert E. Perry, Edith Case, Joey Santana, Jody Johnston, William Tregoe, Barbara Davis, Maidie Norman.
1957	The Tender Trap	Robert E. Perry	Richard Charlton	Ann Lee, Oliver Cliff, Joan Hovis, Philip Reed, C. J. Miller, Joel Marston, Nancy Fichet, Carl Anderson.
1957	King of Hearts	Robert E. Perry	Richard Charlton	Brian Donlevy, Betty Lynn, James Dobson, Maidie Norman, Ricky Keene.
1957	The Chalk Garden	Robert E. Perry	Richard Charlton	Lillian Gish, Dorothy Gish, Philip Tonge, William Allyn, Denise Alexander, Betsy Jones-Moreland, Lucille Smith, Grace Etchen.
1957	The Reluctant Debutante	Robert E. Perry	Richard Charlton	Edward Everett Horton, Olive Blakeney, Susan Luckey, Paul Stickles, Michael Hall, Helene Heigh, Lynne Erzinger.
1957	The Old Lady Shows Her Medals	Robert E. Perry	Richard Charlton	Gracie Fields, Biff McQuire, Fred Cahill, Kit Pedler, Olga Rogers, Marion Fernandez. Fields sang songs to supplement this hour-long one-act play.
1957	Janus	Robert E. Perry	Richard Charlton	Imogene Coca, Jules Munshin, Oliver Cliff, Mary Mace, Robert E. Perry.
1957	Witness for the Prosecution	Luther Kennett	Richard Charlton	Geoffrey Lumb, Jorja Curtwright, Oliver Cliff, Chester Stratton, Milton Parsons, Margaret Brewster, Robert E. Perry.
1957	Will Success Spoil Rock Hunter?	Luther Kennett	Richard Charlton	Wally Cox, Carol Kelly, Herb Vigran, Seth Fitchet, Carl Betz, Robert E. Perry, Jean Hopkins, Keith Watson.
1957	Glad Tidings	Robert E. Perry	Richard Charlton	Faye Emerson, Murray Matheson, Shirley Mitchell, Marion Fernandez, Keith Watson, Kay Crum, Robert E. Perry, Anthony Rich.
Fall; 1957	An Evening with Noel Coward	Paul Godkin	Ruth Burch; Russell B. Orton	Sarah Churchill, John Archer.
Fall; 1957	At Home with Ethel Waters		Richard Charlton	Ethel Waters, Reginald Beane (accompanist). This was an all-musical program of songs.
Fall; 1957	The Great Sebastians	Harry Ellerbe	Richard Charlton	Imogene Coca, Jules Munshin, Kurt Katch, Donald Freed.
1958	Blithe Spirit	Oliver Cliff	Richard Charlton	Eva Gabor, Peter Forster, June Taylor, Katherine Squire, Elizabeth Barber, George Mitchell, Maurine Cookson.
1958	You Can't Take It with You	Oliver Cliff	Richard Charlton	Charles Coburn, Katherine Squire, Chris Gordon, Ann Daniels, Anthony C. Rich, Gerri Solomon, George Pembrook, Peter Forster, Jim Hurley.
1958	Claudia	Oliver Cliff	Richard Charlton	Terry Moore, Carl Betz, Beverly Bayne, Katherine Squire, George Mitchell, Peter Forster, Elizabeth Talbot-Martin, Maurine Cookson.
1958	Three Men on a Horse	Oliver Cliff	Richard Charlton	Buster Keaton, Chris Gordon, Bob Aden, Jim Hurley, George Mitchell, Katherine Squire.
1958	Separate Tables	Oliver Cliff	Richard Charlton	Signe Hasso, Don Porter, Maurine Cookson.
1958	Bus Stop	Oliver Cliff	Richard Charlton	Marie Wilson, Robert Gist, Maurine Cookson, Wilton Graff, James Hurley, Sally Fraser, George Mitchell, Bob Aden.
1958	Holiday for Lovers	Oliver Cliff	Richard Charlton	Richard Arlen, (Note: Director Cliff substituted for Arlen on opening night due to the latter's illness.) Holly Harris, Gail Ganley, Ann Daniels, Katherine Squire, Anthony C. Rich, Henri Berchard, George Mitchell, Jeanne Clark.
1958	Duke Ellington		Richard Charlton	Duke Ellington and his orchestra, Ozzie Baily, James Truitt, Lester Horton Dancers. An all-musical concert with songs and dancing.
1958	Inherit the Wind	Oliver Cliff	Richard Charlton	Sidney Blackmer, Coleman Francis, Anthony C. Rich, Joe Flynn, Bob Pollard, George Mitchell, Ann Daniels, Katherine Squire.
1958	The Time of the Cuckoo	Oliver Cliff	Richard Charlton	Miriam Hopkins, Stephen Bekassy, Brett Halsey, Ann Daniels, Maurine Cookson, George Mitchell, Karerine Squire, Bobby Swindle, Mel Stevens Jr.
1958	Laura	Oliver Cliff	Richard Charlton	Diana Barrymore, Anthony Eustrel, Dean Harens, Clement Brace, Anthony C. Rich, Maurine Cookson, Katherine Squire, Keith Watson.
1958	The Silver Whistle	Oliver Cliff	Richard Charlton	Burgess Meredith, Katherine Squire, Hope Summers, Lynn Bernay, Oliver Cliff, Maurine Cookson, Jeanne Clarke.

=== 1959-1968, 1976 ===
Year	Play	Director	Producer	Leading Cast and Notes
1959	Kind Sir	Oliver Cliff	Richard Charlton	Joan Bennett, Donald Cook, Maurine Cookson, Earle MacVeigh, Gail Hillson, Alex Petrie.
1959	Jane	Ramsey Burch	Richard Charlton	Ruth Chatterton, Wilton Graff, John Ward, King Moody, Sally Fraser, Maurine Cookson, Earle MacVeigh.
1959	The Happiest Millionaire	Oliver Cliff	Richard Charlton	Walter Pidgeon, Sue Randall, Maurine Cookson, Ed Caldwell, Earle MacVeigh, King Moody, Ken Boyer, Paul Jasmin, Jay Fineberg.
1959	The Boy Friend	Gus Schirmer Jr.	The New Process Company	Barbara Ruick, Holly Harris, Sharon Randall, Bill Mullikin, Roy Fitzell, June Squibb, Lydia Stevens.
1959	Happy Birthday	Ramsey Burch	Richard Charlton	Joan Blondell, Oliver Cliff, Maurine Cookson, Earle MacVeigh, Ed Caldwell, Cheerio Meredith, Dodie Baurer, Perry Ivins, Roberta Blalock.
1959	The Bad Seed	Ramsey Burch	Richard Charlton	Jan Sterling, Patty Ann Gerrity, King Moody, Louise Lorimer, Robert Aden, Harvey Stephens, Jean Wood, Oliver Cliff.
1959	Dear Liar	Jerome Kilty	Guthrie McClintic; Sol Hurok	Katharine Cornell, Brian Aherne. This was the world premiere for this original production.
1959	Fallen Angels	Oliver Cliff	Richard Charlton	Nancy Walker, Margaret Phillips, Oliver Cliff, Molly Roden, Earle MacVeigh, King Moody.
1959	Not in the Book	Richard Bender	Gilbert Miller	Edward Everett Horton, Reginald Owen, Renee Gadd, Ralph Purdom, Claude Horton, Herbert Voland, John Irving, Lawrence Berger.
1959	Diary of Ann Frank	Francis Lederer	Richard Charlton	Francis Lederer, Denise Alexander, Maurine Cookson, Janet Brandt, Jack Hamel, Carla Hoffman, Jay Adler.
1960	The Late Christopher Bean	Oliver Cliff	Richard Charlton	Shirley Booth, Don Beddoe, Jacklyn O'Donnell, Maurine Cookson, Carolee Campbell, Robert Curtis, Eric Sinclair, Jay Jostyn.
1960	A View from the Bridge	Luther Adler	Richard Charlton	Luther Adler, Alan Mixon, Kathleen Widdoes, Mary James, Paul Haney
1960	The Cherry Orchard	Daniel Petrie	Richard Charlton	Helen Hayes, John Abbott, Tom Clancy, Peggy McCay, Ronald Long, Woodrow Parfrey, Cathy Willard, John Colicos.
1960	The Girls in 509	Oliver Cliff	Richard Charlton	Fay Bainter, Ann B. Davis, Lynn Shubert, Joseph Holland, Burt Mustin, Jack Welles, Maurine Cookson, Fred Cahill.
1960	Biography	Luther Kennett	Richard Charlton	Faye Emerson, Michael Sivy, Sol Frieder, Larry Bockius, Harry Mehaffey, Ann Folger, Jean Cameron, Keith Harrington.
1960	Who Was That Lady I Saw You With?	Oliver Cliff	Richard Charlton	Wendell Corey, Hugh Marlowe, Phyllis Avery, Jerome Cowan, Ted Knight, Roy Sorrells, Maurine Cookson.
1960	Once More, with Feeling!	Oliver Cliff	Richard Charlton	June Havoc, Roy Roberts, Oliver Cliff, Don Shelton, Sam Hearn, Howard Wendell, Paul Hudson, William Pullen.
1960	Tonight at the Opera	Val Rosing	Richard Charlton	Kathryn Grayson, David Poleri, Jean Cook, Gilbert Russell. (Note: Val Rosing used his birth name for directoral credit and his stage name Gilbert Russell for performing the final scenes from Faust with Jean Cook.) Selection of arias from seven grand operas, with chorus and orchestra.
1960	Father of the Bride	Oliver Cliff	Richard Charlton	Joe E. Brown, Olive Sturgess, Maurine Cookson, John Craig, Dayton Osmond, Julie Sommars, James Stapleton, Malcolm Cassell.
1960	Two for the Seesaw		Richard Charlton	Ruth Roman, Hugh Marlowe. The reviewer praised the acting but criticized long curtains between acts.
1960	The Pleasure of His Company	Oliver Cliff	Richard Charlton	Francis Lederer, Vivian Vance, John Emery, Lori Nelson, Lewis Martin, Robert Gothie, Robert Kino.
1961	Candida	Guthrie McClintic	Richard Charlton	Jane Wyatt, Gene Raymond, Reginald Denny, Burt Brinckerhoff, Richard Grant, Maurine Cookson.
1961	The Marriage-Go-Round	Warren Enters	Richard Charlton	Hugh Marlowe, Constance Bennett, Anna-Lisa, Tom Palmer.
1961	The World of Suzie Wong	Aaron Frankel	Richard Charlton	Lani Miyazaki, Jack Ryland, Alan Marshal, Victor Sen Yung, Harvey Stephens, Sally Fraser, Joe Wong, Chuck Lee, Jack Song, Tiko Ling, Judy Wong, Linda Ho.
1962				
1963				
1964				
1965	Absence for a Cello	Charles Olsen		Hans Conried, Florida Friebus, Dolores Michaels, Nydia Westman, William Christopher, Julie Parrish, Dennis Patrick.
1965	Mary, Mary	Wayne Carson		Julia Meade, Scott McKay, Edward Mulhare, Irene Kane, Clinton Sundberg.
1965	Never Too Late	George Abbott		Milton Berle, Joy Hodges, Donna Jean, Anthony Roberts, Douglas Rutherford, Kay Elliot
1966				
1967				
1968	Generation	Robert Cummings	Guy S. Little Jr	Robert Cummings, Howard Platt, Pamela Shoop, Jerry Hausner, Bob Osborne, David Rosenbaum.
1968	Everybody's Girl		Guy S. Little Jr	Vivian Vance, Michael Quinlivan, Kay Frye, Hub Henderson
1968	The Fantasticks	William Francisco	Guy S. Little Jr	Howard Keel, Susan Watson, Jack Blackton, Dean Dittman, Gwyllum Evans, Lionel Wilson, Edward Garrabrandt, Don Miller.
1968	The Odd Couple	Ernest D. Glucksman	Guy S. Little Jr	Jesse White, Ray Walston, Arthur Hanson, Louis Guss, Benjamin Stone, Patrick Campbell, Marci Mann, Carol Thomas.
1968	Glad Tidings	Leslie B. Cutler	Guy S. Little Jr	Ann Sothern, John Himes, Eve McVeagh, Elizabeth Kerr, Anne Archer, Tom Basham Jr., Arthur Hanson, Elizabeth Lee, William Hudnut.
1968	The Owl and the Pussycat		Guy S. Little Jr	Pat Suzuki, Robert Reed. Reed replaced an actor who broke his leg during rehearsal.
1968	The Guardsman	Christopher Hewitt	Guy S. Little Jr	Kathryn Crosby, Edward Mulhare, Ronald Drake, Lucy Landau, Norma Doggett, Tom Bate, Grace Etchen.
1968	The Torch-Bearers	George Kelly	Guy S. Little Jr	Cornelia Otis Skinner, Mildred Natwick, Joe Flynn, Marion Moses. The then 81-year-old Kelly directed his own play.
1976	Sleuth		Richard Charlton	Michael Allinson, Jordan Christopher.
