= Escapement (disambiguation) =

An escapement is a mechanism for imparting power to a clock or watch mechanism, with timing controlled by a pendulum or other resonant device.

Escapement may also refer to:

- A part of a piano action, designed to permit the hammer to fly freely before striking a note so that it will not damp the string's vibration on impact.
- Escapement (radio control), an obsolete precursor to the servo, used for the control of a radio-controlled model
- Escapement (film), a 1958 British film
- Escapement (fishing), the portion of the spawning stock surviving fishing pressures over a spawning cycle in fisheries science
