= High vacuum =

High vacuum may refer to:

- A vacuum with pressure in the range from 100 mPa to 100 nPa
- High Vacuum, the 1957 novel by Charles Eric Maine

See also:

- Ultra-high vacuum
