= Black Saddle =

American TV Western series (1959–1960)

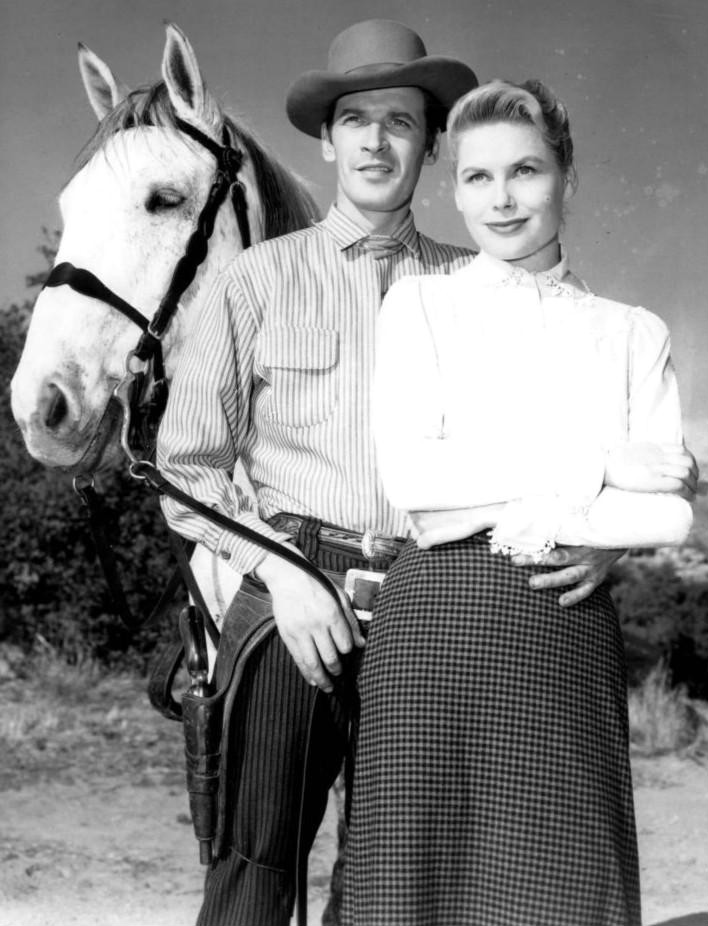
- Peter Breck as Clay Culhane and Anna-Lisa as Nora Travers (1959)
- Genre: Western
- Created by: Hal Hudson; John McGreevey
- Starring: Peter Breck; Russell Johnson; Anna-Lisa; J. Pat O'Malley; Walter Burke
- Theme music composer: Jerry Goldsmith; Arthur Morton
- Composers: Michael Hennagin; Arthur Morton
- Country of origin: United States
- Original language: English
- No. of seasons: 2
- No. of episodes: 44

Production
- Executive producer: Hal Hudson
- Producers: Antony Ellis; Hal Hudson
- Camera setup: Single-camera
- Running time: 24 mins.

Original release
- Network: NBC (1959); ABC (1959-1960)
- Release: January 10, 1959 – May 6, 1960

Black Saddle is an American Western television series starring Peter Breck that aired 44 half-hour black-and-white episodes from January 10, 1959, to May 6, 1960. The first season of 20 episodes aired on NBC from January 1959 to September 1959. ABC picked up the second season in the 1959-1960 season with 24 new episodes produced. The half-hour program was produced by Dick Powell's Four Star Television, and the original backdoor pilot was an episode of CBS's Dick Powell's Zane Grey Theatre, with Chris Alcaide originally portraying the principal character, Clay Culhane, in an episode entitled "A Threat of Violence."

== Synopsis ==
Clay Culhane is a gunfighter who becomes a lawyer after his brothers are killed in a shootout. He carries his law books as he rides across the New Mexico Territory in the years following the Civil War, ready to help people who need help with the law. U. S. Marshal Gib Scott follows Culhane, dubious of Culhane's turning away from gunfighting. Nora Travers owns the town's hotel, and Kelly is the bartender at the saloon.

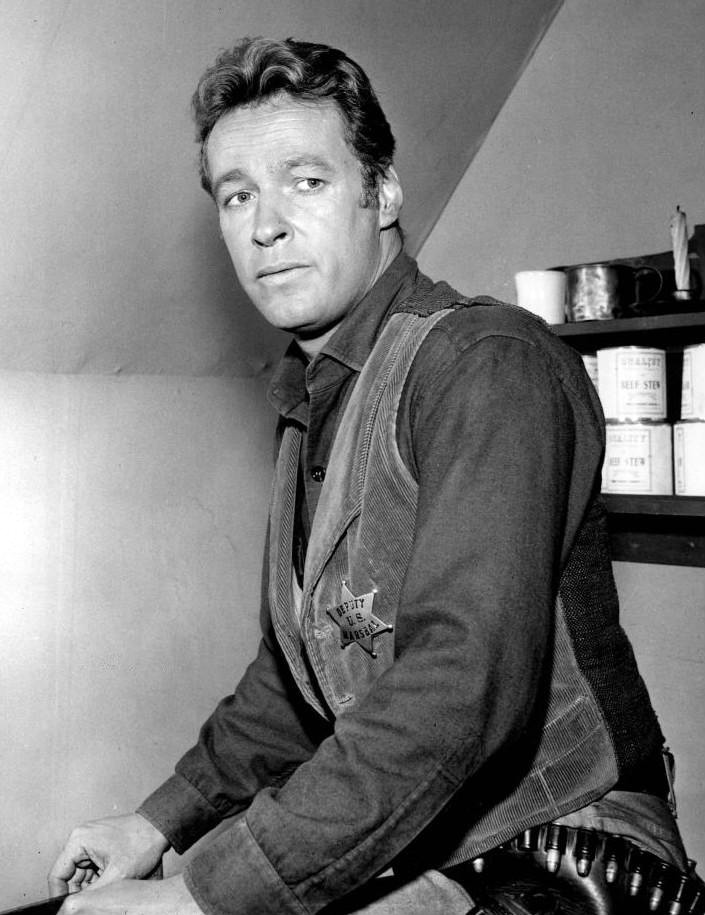
Russell Johnson as Marshal Gib Scott

== Cast ==
=== Main cast ===
- Peter Breck as Clay Culhane
- Russell Johnson as Marshal Gib Scott
- Anna-Lisa as Nora Travers
- J. Pat O'Malley as Judge Caleb Marsh
- Walter Burke as Tim Potter

=== Guest cast ===
Some of the Black Saddle guest stars include Warren Oates, Chris Alcaide (who portrayed Clay Culhane in the original pilot), Fred Aldrich, John Anderson, Parley Baer, Raymond Bailey, Russ Bender, Paul Birch (in the role of U.S. President Ulysses S. Grant in the episode "Mr. Simpson"), Lane Bradford, Paul Burke, Archie Butler, James Coburn, Dennis Cross, John Dehner, Frank de Kova, Alan Dexter, Tex Driscoll, Buddy Ebsen, Hampton Fancher, Scott Forbes in Episode "Client: Steele"), James Franciscus, Jack Ging, Dabbs Greer, Robert Griffin, Clu Gulager, Robert Harland, Stacy Harris, Michael Hinn, Ray Jones, Warren J. Kemmerling, Brett King, Jess Kirkpatrick, Robert Knapp, John Marley, Ken Mayer, Ann McCrea, Rod McGaughy, Patrick McVey, James Parnell, Vic Perrin, Sam Reese, Stafford Repp, Stephen Roberts, Bing Russell, Richard Rust, Simon Scott, Richard Shannon, Robert F. Simon, Quentin Sondergaard, Jack Tornek and Patrick Macnee.

== Episodes ==
=== Season 1 (1959) ===
No. overall	No. in season	Title	Directed by	Written by	Original release date
1	1	"Client: Travers"	John English	John McGreevey	January 10, 1959
2	2	"Client: Meade"	Roger Kay	John McGreevey	January 17, 1959
3	3	"Client: McQueen"	John English	Robert Yale Libott	January 24, 1959
4	4	"Client: Dawes"	Roger Kay	John McGreevey	January 31, 1959
5	5	"Client: Starkey"	John English	Robert Yale Libott	February 7, 1959
6	6	"Client: Tagger"	John English	Frederick Louis Fox	February 14, 1959
7	7	"Client: Robinson"	John Florea	Jack Jacobs	February 21, 1959
8	8	"Client: Martinez"	Francis D. Lyon	John Tucker Battle	March 7, 1959
9	9	"Client: Northrup"	David Lowell Rich	John McGreevey	March 14, 1959
10	10	"Client: Steele"	Francis D. Lyon	Rod Peterson	March 21, 1959
11	11	"Client: Mowery"	David Lowell Rich	Frederick Louis Fox	March 28, 1959
12	12	"Client: Braun"	David Lowell Rich	John McGreevey	April 4, 1959
13	13	"Client: Banks"	John English	Antony Ellis	April 11, 1959
14	14	"Client: Jessup"	John English	Stuart Jerome	April 18, 1959
15	15	"Client: Frome"	John English	Frederick Louis Fox	April 25, 1959
16	16	"Client: Nelson"	Boris Sagal	John McGreevey	May 2, 1959
17	17	"Client: Neal Adams"	William D. Faralla	Ken Kolb	May 9, 1959
18	18	"Client: Brand"	Gerd Oswald	Joe Stone & Paul King	May 16, 1959
19	19	"Client: Reynolds"	David Lowell Rich	John McGreevey	May 23, 1959
20	20	"Client: Vardon"	William D. Faralla	Frederick Louis Fox	May 30, 1959

=== Season 2 (1959–60) ===
No. overall	No. in season	Title	Directed by	Written by	Original release date
21	1	"The Freebooters"	William D. Faralla	John McGreevey	October 2, 1959
22	2	"The Saddle"	David Lowell Rich	John McGreevey	October 9, 1959
23	3	"The Long Rider"	David Lowell Rich	Antony Ellis	October 16, 1959
24	4	"The Hotel"	James Sheldon	Antony Ellis	October 23, 1959
25	5	"Client: Peter Warren"	David Lowell Rich	Donn Mullally	October 30, 1959
26	6	"The Freight Line"	David Lowell Rich	Antony Ellis	November 6, 1959
27	7	"Murdock"	David Lowell Rich	Fred Frieberger	November 13, 1959
28	8	"Apache Killer"	William D. Faralla	Joe Stone & Paul King	November 20, 1959
29	9	"Four from Stillwater"	David Lowell Rich	George & Gertrude Fass	November 27, 1959
30	10	"The Deal"	David Lowell Rich	William Link & Richard Levinson	December 4, 1959
31	11	"Change of Venue"	William D. Faralla	John McGreevey	December 11, 1959
32	12	"Blood Money"	Frank Baur	John McGreevey	December 18, 1959
33	13	"The Killer"	William F. Claxton	Antony Ellis	January 1, 1960
34	14	"Letter of Death"	David Lowell Rich	Frederick Louis Fox	January 8, 1960
35	15	"Mr. Simpson"	David Lowell Rich	Antony Ellis	January 22, 1960
36	16	"Means to an End"	Frank Baur	John McGreevey	January 29, 1960
37	17	"The Indian Tree"	David Lowell Rich	John McGreevey & Antony Ellis	February 19, 1960
38	18	"The Apprentice"	David Lowell Rich	John McGreevey	March 11, 1960
39	19	"Burden of Guilt"	Elliott Silverstein	John McGreevey	March 18, 1960
40	20	"The Cabin"	David Lowell Rich	Antony Ellis	April 1, 1960
41	21	"The Return"	David Lowell Rich	John McGreevey	April 8, 1960
42	22	"A Case of Slow"	David Lowell Rich	Antony Ellis	April 15, 1960
43	23	"The Penalty"	William D. Faralla	John Falvo	April 22, 1960
44	24	"End of the Line"	William F. Claxton	Richard Fielder	May 6, 1960

== Production ==
Originally entitled War Gun, but changed just prior to filming (presumably due to the similarity to Warner Brothers' Lawman), the series was created by executive producers Hal Hudson and John McGreevey. Antony Ellis was the producer. On NBC the show was broadcast on Saturdays from 9 to 9:30 p.m. Eastern Time. When it was moved to ABC it was shown on Fridays from 10:30 to 11 p.m. E. T.

The pilot for the series was "Threat to Violence", the May 23, 1958, episode of Dick Powell's Zane Grey Theatre. Chris Alcaide portrayed Culhane in it, with Johnson and Anna Lisa in the roles that they had in the series. The change of stars occurred because the program's sponsor thought Alacaide "had become too familiar as a villain".

=== Filming ===
The NBC episodes were filmed at Fox Movie Ranch in the Santa Monica Mountains, while ABC's were shot at the Republic studio lot in Studio City.

=== Theme ===
Although the Black Saddle TV series lasted less than two full seasons, its original theme tune—written by Jerry Goldsmith under the name of his then-brother-in-law, J. Michael Hennagin, because Goldsmith himself was still under contract to CBS—lives on. Several cover versions of the tune have been recorded, many of which have since become available on YouTube. Moreover, from February 1967 until at least the fall of 1992, the theme was frequently featured in the programs of marching bands and bugle corps.

=== Syndication as The Westerners ===
For syndicated reruns, Black Saddle was combined with several other short-run Four Star series, Law of the Plainsman, Johnny Ringo, and The Westerner, under the umbrella title, The Westerners, with new hosting sequences by Keenan Wynn.

== Critical response ==
A review of the premiere episode in the trade publication Variety said that the script "did not stand up with the better westerns" and indicated that the pace of the episode should have been faster. The review called the characterizations of the sheriff and the villain "hard to swallow". Lisa was praised, primarily for her beauty, while Breck was said to be "okay in a flat sort of way", and the "Supporting cast was competent."
