= 13 Ghosts =

1960 film

- Theatrical release poster
- Directed by: William Castle
- Written by: Robb White
- Produced by: William Castle
- Starring: Charles Herbert; Jo Morrow; Rosemary DeCamp; Margaret Hamilton; Donald Woods
- Cinematography: Joseph F. Biroc
- Edited by: Edwin H. Bryant
- Music by: Von Dexter
- Production company: William Castle Productions
- Distributed by: Columbia Pictures
- Release date: July 1960
- Running time: 84 minutes
- Country: United States
- Language: English
- Box office: $1.5 million (US/Canada)

13 Ghosts is a 1960 American supernatural horror film produced and directed by William Castle, written by Robb White and starring Rosemary DeCamp, Margaret Hamilton, Charles Herbert, Martin Milner, Jo Morrow, John van Dreelen, and Donald Woods.

13 Ghosts was released in 1960 as a double bill with 12 to the Moon, The Electronic Monster or Battle in Outer Space, depending on the film market.

== Plot ==
Occultist Dr. Plato Zorba bequeaths a large house to his impoverished nephew Cyrus. Along with his wife Hilda, teen daughter Medea, and adolescent son Buck, Cyrus is informed by lawyer Ben Rush that the house comes with ghosts that Dr. Zorba has collected from around the world. The will stipulates that the family must stay in the house and cannot sell it, or it will be turned over to the state. The family is shocked to find that the house is really haunted by 12 ghosts. The furnished mansion also comes with a creepy housekeeper, Elaine, who conducts seances, and unknown to the family, a hidden fortune concealed somewhere on the property. The spirits include a wailing lady, clutching hands, a fiery skeleton, an Italian chef continuously murdering his wife and her lover in the kitchen, a hanging lady, an executioner holding a severed head, a fully grown lion with its headless tamer, a floating head, and a ghost of Zorba himself, all held captive in the eerie house and looking for an unlucky 13th ghost to free them. Dr. Zorba also leaves a set of special goggles, the only way of seeing the ghosts. A Ouija board warns the family that a death will occur in the house.

Rush, the estate executor, knows Zorba's fortune is hidden somewhere in the house, having unsuccessfully searched for it previously. When two $100 bills fall loose after Buck slides down the stairs, Rush tricks Buck into secretly searching for the money. After Buck finds the cash under the stairs, Rush carries the sleeping boy out of his room and attempts to murder him in the same way that he killed Zorba, using a four-poster bed equipped with a descending canopy that fatally suffocates people.

Dr. Zorba's ghost appears, killing the terrified Rush by driving him under the canopy as Buck awakens and escapes. Rush has become the 13th ghost. The next morning, Cyrus and his family count the recovered money and decide to stay. Elaine says the ghosts have left but predicts they will return, much to Buck's delight. Unseen by the family, a force blows the special glasses into smithereens. Elaine gets a broom and permits herself a small, enigmatic smile.

== Cast ==
- Charles Herbert as Arthur "Buck" Zorba
- Jo Morrow as Medea Zorba
- Rosemary DeCamp as Hilda Zorba
- Martin Milner as Benjamin Rush
- Donald Woods as Cyrus Zorba
- Margaret Hamilton as Elaine Zacharides
- John van Dreelen as Van Allen

== Release and reception ==
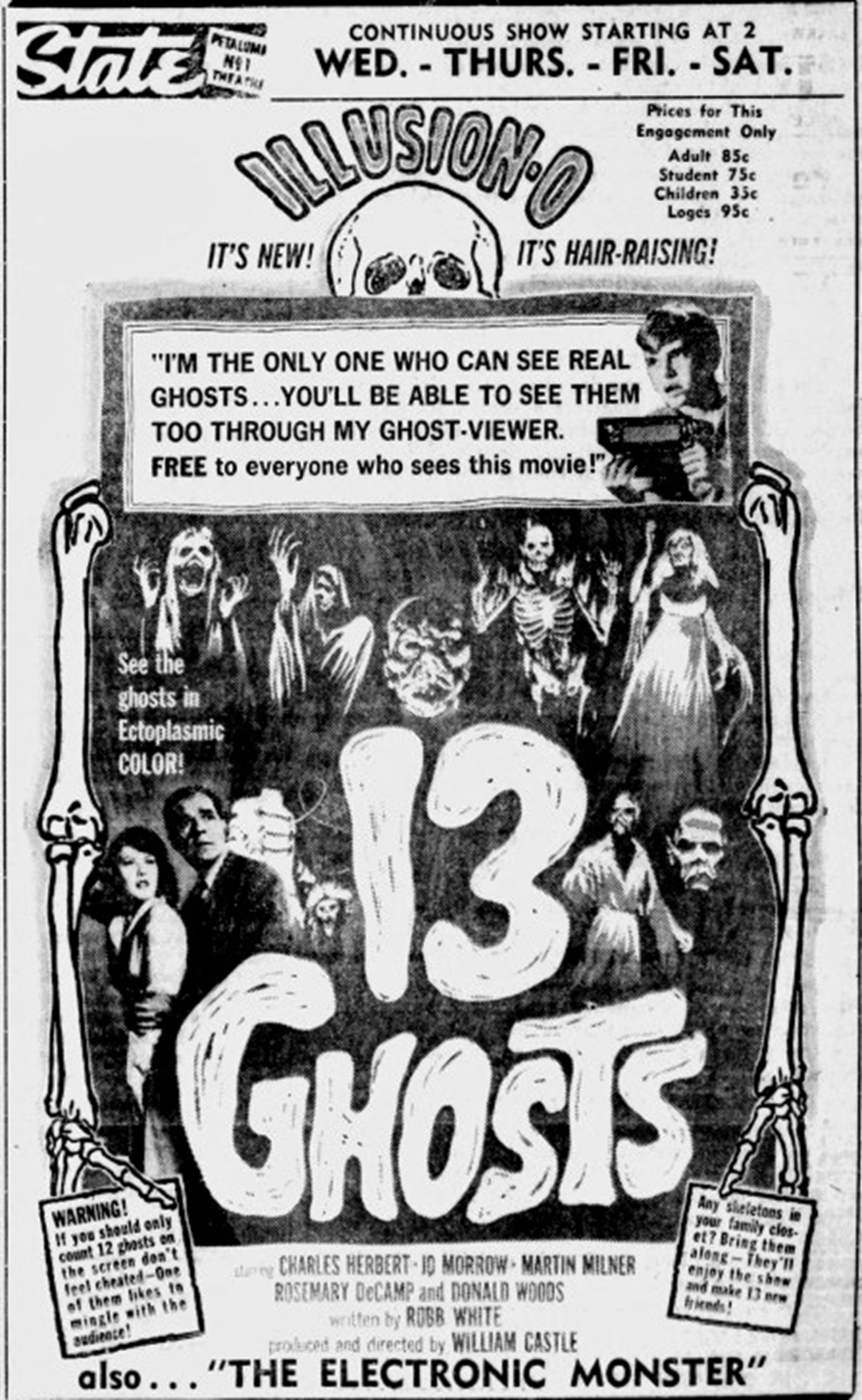
Advertisement from 1960

As with several of his more famous productions, producer William Castle used a gimmick to promote 13 Ghosts, as audience members were given the choice to see the ghosts. In theaters, most scenes were in black-and-white, but scenes involving ghosts were shown in a process dubbed "Illusion-O". The filmed elements of the actors and the sets – everything except the ghosts – had a blue filter applied to the footage, while the ghost elements had a red filter and were superimposed over the frame. Audiences received viewing glasses with red and blue cellophane filters. Unlike with early 3D glasses having one eye red and the other cyan or blue, the Illusion-O device required viewers to look through a single color with both eyes. Looking through the red filter intensified the images of the ghosts, while the blue filter "removed" them.

Television and home video releases are edited to simulate the effect without the need for special glasses. The 2001 DVD release, however, reinstated the Illusion-o effect and included a replica of the red and blue ghost viewer.

Another gimmick for the film saw the first 20 million to buy a ticket receiving a key, one of which would unlock a supposed "haunted house" Castle had purchased in France. The filmgoer whose key opened the door would become winner of the house; however, it is unknown if the prize was ever claimed.

Howard Thompson of The New York Times called the film "a simple, old-fashioned haunted house yarn" that "would be a lot better off without this gimmick." Variety wrote: "The idea is sound and exploitable, but the execution doesn't fully come off," explaining the ghosts "lack personality and aren't frightening, so that there isn't sufficient tension in the sequences during which the 'ghost viewer' comes into play." The Monthly Film Bulletin called it "a workmanlike but not very frightening horror film ... the ghosts, which are a dull red colour, are far less effective when witnessed than when their presence is merely suggested, especially when their viewability depends on a process as unremarkable as Illusion-O."

== Remake ==
The film was remade in 2001 as Thirteen Ghosts, directed by Steve Beck. As with the original, the film was distributed by Columbia Pictures, except in the United States and Canada, where it was distributed by Warner Bros. Pictures.

== See also ==
- List of American films of 1960
- List of ghost films
