= 12 to the Moon =

1960 film by David Bradley

- Theatrical release poster
- Directed by: David Bradley
- Written by: Fred Gebhardt; DeWitt Bodeen
- Produced by: Fred Gebhardt
- Starring: Ken Clark; Michi Kobi; Tom Conway; Anna-Lisa
- Cinematography: John Alton
- Edited by: Edward Mann
- Music by: Michael Andersen
- Distributed by: Columbia Pictures
- Release date: June 1960
- Running time: 74 minutes
- Country: United States
- Language: English
- Budget: $150,000

12 to the Moon is a 1960 independently made American black-and-white science fiction film, produced and written by Fred Gebhardt, directed by David Bradley, and starring Ken Clark, Michi Kobi, Tom Conway, and Anna-Lisa. The film was distributed in the U.S. on June 10, 1960, by Columbia Pictures as a double feature with the Japanese film Battle in Outer Space (1959). In some areas it played with either 13 Ghosts (1960) or The Electronic Monster (1958).

12 to the Moon was novelized by Fred Gebhardt under the pen name Robert A. Wise and published in 1961. Gebhardt also wrote the film's original story.

== Plot ==
Earth's International Space Order prepares for its first astronaut landing on the Moon, with the goal of claiming it as "international territory." The crew of Lunar Eagle 1 comprises 12 people from around the world, 10 men and two women, all scientists with different specialties, accompanied by a small menagerie including two cats. The spaceship is commanded by American John Anderson.

Historical and international tensions flare up during the flight. Russian Feodor Orloff struts about, annoyingly claiming that all scientific advancements were invented by the Soviets. Israeli David Ruskin warns Feodor that the USSR would be unwise to attempt to dominate Israel, as it has done to his native Poland. David admires fellow astronaut Erich Heinrich, unaware that Erich's father was the Nazi responsible for murdering David's family during the Holocaust.

After a dangerous 27-hour flight, Lunar Eagle 1 lands and the crew begin their exploration of the Moon. Sigrid Bomark and Selim Hamid find an air-filled cave and, after shedding their space helmets, they kiss passionately. As they walk hand-in-hand deeper into the cave, its opening is suddenly sealed by impenetrable ice.

The others discover gold and minerals, but when they fire a mortar into a rock formation, liquid begins bubbling out. An excited Feodor rushes over and sticks his hands into the flow, and he is badly burned. On the way back to their spaceship, a crew member sinks to his death in lunar quicksand. John tries unsuccessfully to save him and is almost pulled under.

Inside Lunar Eagle 1, a machine begins printing logograms. Surprisingly, Hideko Murata can read them. It is a message from "The Great Coordinator of the Moon" who orders the crew to leave at once. The message also states that the emotionless Moon-beings live underground and fear that the Earthlings will "contaminate our perfect form of harmony." Sigrid and Salim are being studied because the Moon-beings are unfamiliar with "love." They and "all your kind" will be destroyed "if love turns to evil." The Moon-beings also demand that the expedition's cats, brought as an experiment to see if they could procreate on the Moon, be left behind. They find the cats as interesting as people.

Erich has a heart attack during Lunar Eagle 1's blastoff. As he babbles on half-conscious, David learns that Erich's father was the Nazi who killed David's family. However, when David learns that Erich has disowned his family and devoted his life to trying to make amends for his father's crimes, they become friends.

Near Earth, the crew witnesses "the big freeze," a gigantic freezing cloud controlled from the Moon, which encases all of Canada, the U.S. and Mexico in thick ice.

Erich produces a plan to drop "atomic bomblets" into the volcano Popocatepetl to trigger a huge eruption to thaw out North America. Etienne Martel sabotages the bomblets, revealing himself to be a French communist. He incorrectly assumes that Feodor would also want to keep America frozen in order to advance international communism's quest for world domination. He and Etienne fight, Feodor calls to John for help and when Etienne unfairly pulls out a knife, John knocks the weapon out of his hand while knocking him down. Feodor repairs the bomblets.

Erich and David fly a suicide mission to drop the bomblets from their spaceship's smaller space taxi. Popocatepetl erupts and North America begins to thaw. Another message from the Moon says that the Moon-beings now realize that Earthlings are honorable and peaceful, and that the North Americans were put into suspended animation before the big freeze, so no one has been harmed. Moreover, Earthlings will be welcomed to the Moon whenever they return.

Following the great thaw, Lunar Eagle 1's triumphant crew prepare to land.

== Cast ==
- Ken Clark as Capt. John Anderson
- Michi Kobi as Dr. Hideko Murata
- Tom Conway as Dr. Feodor Orloff
- Anthony Dexter as Dr. Luis Vargas
- John Wengraf as Dr. Erich Heinrich
- Robert Montgomery Jr. as Dr. Rod Murdock
- Phillip Baird as Dr. William Rochester
- Richard Weber as Dr. David Ruskin
- Muzaffer Tema as Dr. Selim Hamid (as Tema Bey)
- Roger Til as Dr. Etienne Martel
- Cory Devlin as Dr. Asmara Markonen
- Anna-Lisa as Dr. Sigrid Bomark
- Francis X. Bushman as Secretary General of the International Space Order

== Production ==
12 to the Moon was in production from April through June 1959 at Hollywood's California Studios. The actual filming took seven or eight days, and the entire film was budgeted at $150,000. Although the film was not released theatrically for another year, the American Film Institute notes that "According to an Oct 1959 HR [The Hollywood Reporter] news item, Columbia purchased the independent production in Aug 1959, intending to rush it into release to capitalize on the topicality of a space launch." Director David Bradley fought over the reediting of the film.

== Release ==
12 to the Moon premiered in Los Angeles on June 10, 1960. Columbia Pictures handled the theatrical release in the US and the UK during the same year, pairing it with Battle in Outer Space (1959). In some areas, it was shown with either 13 Ghosts (1960) or The Electronic Monster (1958). It opened in Mexico on February 23, 1961, and was also shown in Australia.

The film was syndicated to American television in September 1963, as part of Screen Gems' "X" package of horror and science fiction films.

== Reception ==
Contemporary film critics generally found the film to be, in the words of British film critic Phil Hardy, "a decidedly minor offering, the presence of [DeWitt] Bodeen (writer of Cat People, 1942) and [John] Alton, one of Hollywood's unsung cinematographic geniuses, notwithstanding". "Kobe", writing in the June 22, 1960 issue of Variety, praised Alton's camerawork but called 12 to the Moon a "[l]ower-half science-fantasy item in which a dozen good eggs from earth tangle with some righteous, but misdirected, lunatics. Timely, but crude and cliché-ridden" An anonymous reviewer in BoxOffice referred to the film as "[a] modest science fiction programmer [which] will satisfy the youngsters and the action fans who delight in stories of rocketships to the moon." The magazine awarded the film a rating of "fair". According to science-fiction film critic and historian Bill Warren, the Monthly Film Review said that the film was a "juvenile piece of hokum" with "only its special effects and weird lunar landscape to recommend it", although Kinematograph Weekly in the UK found more merit, calling 12 to the Moon "extravagant and intriguing [with a] fascinating subject, sound acting [and] resourceful technical presentation."

Modern-day critics have called the film "extremely strange and unpredictable". American film critic Gary Westphal points out that the "unusually large crew of twelve [is] said to represent twelve different countries", which indicates that the journey is motivated primarily by a desire "to prevent national disputes arising over the moon in particular and, one infers, other subjects in general." However, as Warren points out, "each person acts in accordance with national stereotypes and has virtually no other characterization."

Modern critics have criticized the film's special effects. For example, Westphal writes that the space helmets have no visors, but each is instead equipped with an "invisible electromagnetic ray screen" that protects the astronauts' faces. He speculates that the obviously missing visors were perhaps not noticed until late in the filming and that a scene that explains the ray screens was inserted prior to the film's release before audiences could wonder about it. Critic Bryan Senn notes that "[t]he effects are minimal and substandard, consisting mainly of the same shot of a rocket traveling through space used over and over again (and it's not even a convincing shot - the stars shine right through the transparent-looking ship)", although he calls the Moon set "eerie and effectively alien, with its cracks, weird shadows, and smoke seeping from mysterious holes." Warren points out that the Earth-saving eruption of Popocatepetl is "depicted by stock footage of solar prominences" that bear little resemblance to real volcanic eruptions.

Some modern critics find fault with the film's narrative development. Westphal says that "[f]ew films ... begin as soberly, and end as absurdly, as 12 to the Moon. The film's first thirty minutes promise an internationalized update of Destination Moon [1950], while later events rival a Flash Gordon serial." Senn agrees that the film is disappointing, noting that "[w]hat starts out as a fairly intelligent and progressive space-travel film ... quickly degenerates into a juvenile, simplistic space opera. Admittedly, space operas have their place, but 12 to the Moon fails to deliver even a single aria, much less the whole opera."

== Home media ==
12 to the Moon was released in 2010 on Region 1 DVD by Sony Pictures Home Entertainment. Mill Creek Entertainment released it again in 2015 on Region 1 DVD as part of its Vintage Sci-Fi 6 Movie Collection. Shout! Factory also released on DVD the Mystery Science Theater 3000 episode lampooning the film.

== Mystery Science Theater 3000 ==
12 to the Moon was featured in episode #524 of Mystery Science Theater 3000, along with the short Design for Dreaming. The episode debuted on February 5, 1994, on Comedy Central. The episode's interstitial host segments feature Nuveena, the Woman of the Future, played by Bridget Jones, taken from Design for Dreaming.

12 to the Moon did not make the MST3K fan-voted top-100 list, but writer Jim Vogel ranks the episode #34 of the 191 total MST3K episodes. Vogel was entertained by 12 to the Moon's shortcomings, saying, "The crew of 12 international astronauts are wonderfully stupid, in a way that only movie astronauts can be. ... It's so earnestly stupid that it's impossible to not be charmed by it."

12 to the Moon was included as part of the Mystery Science Theater 3000, Volume XXXV DVD collection, released by Shout! Factory on March 29, 2016. The collection includes a documentary on the making of the film, You Are There: Launching 12 to the Moon, narrated by film historian Jeff Burr. The other episodes in the four-disc set include Teenage Caveman (episode #315), Being from Another Planet (episode #405) and Deathstalker and the Warriors from Hell (episode #703).
