= Calculated Risk (novel) =

1960 novel written by Charles Eric Maine

- First edition
- Author: Charles Eric Maine
- Cover artist: Martin Kaye
- Language: English
- Genre: Science fiction novel
- Publisher: Hodder & Stoughton, Corgi
- Publication date: 1960
- Publication place: United Kingdom
- Media type: Print
- Pages: 126 pp

Calculated Risk is a 1960 science fiction novel – specifically, a time travel story – by Charles Eric Maine. It was first published in the U. K. by Hodder & Stoughton; a paperback version by Corgi Books appeared in 1962.

The novel explores themes of personal moral responsibility, and in particular the responsibility of scientists to prevent abuse of the results of their research. It uses the device of "psychological time travel" whereby a person's mind could be sent across time and take over the brain and body of another person living in that time – similar to the device in Maine's earlier and better-known "Timeliner".

== Synopsis ==
Phil Calland is a brilliant scientist working in a bleak dystopian 24th Century Britain. In a recent nuclear war, London was left largely in radioactive ruins, survivors living huddled in miserable huts. Britain – like other nations worldwide – is ruled by a harsh military dictatorship. Resumption of nuclear warfare seems just a matter of time, and humanity might not survive the second round.

Under such circumstances, Calland seeks the only available escape for himself and his girlfriend Kay – an escape backwards, four hundred years into the past. Their 24th-century bodies would die, but they would have new bodies in the less harsh environment of mid-20th Century Britain, and could start new lives there. Considering the alternative, the inherent "calculated risk" seems well worth taking.

Desperate to escape, and born of a harsh and ruthless time, Calland does not pause to consider the moral implications of his plan involving the destruction of the original personalities inhabiting two 20th-century brains and bodies – in effect, a double murder.

Calland's equipment works as intended, he and Kay are sent back to the 20th century, and into bodies of the correct gender. Calland finds himself in the body of a successful young man, with an attractive fiancée which he is soon to marry. But going to the rendezvous with Kay at Trafalgar Square, he is shocked to discover the flaw in his plan – Kay's personality had been displaced into the body of an old, ill woman.

Thereupon, Calland seeks to remedy things by an even more ruthless plan – to rebuild his mind-transferring machine and use it to transfer Kay's mind into the body of his 20th-century fiancée, caring nothing about killing her in the process. But his second calculated risk goes completely wrong, with the total ruin of all that he and Kay tried to achieve.

Meanwhile, back in the 24th century Calland's invention falls into the hands of the military regime, and the generals soon realize its military potential and plan a full scale "time invasion" of the 20th century. It falls to another scientist, with a higher moral sense, to stop them at the price of great personal sacrifice.
