= Murder Is My Business =

1946 film by Sam Newfield

- Theatrical release poster
- Directed by: Sam Newfield
- Screenplay by: Fred Myton
- Based on: The Uncomplaining Corpses by Brett Halliday
- Produced by: Sigmund Neufeld
- Starring: Hugh Beaumont; Cheryl Walker; Lyle Talbot; George Meeker; Pierre Watkin; Richard Keene
- Cinematography: Jack Greenhalgh
- Edited by: Holbrook N. Todd
- Music by: Leo Erdody
- Production company: Sigmund Neufeld Productions
- Distributed by: Producers Releasing Corporation
- Release date: March 7, 1946
- Running time: 64 minutes
- Country: United States
- Language: English

Murder Is My Business is a 1946 American action film directed by Sam Newfield and written by Fred Myton. It is based on the 1940 novel The Uncomplaining Corpses by Brett Halliday. The film stars Hugh Beaumont, Cheryl Walker, Lyle Talbot, George Meeker, Pierre Watkin, and Richard Keene. The film was released on March 7, 1946, by Producers Releasing Corporation.

== Plot ==
Arnold Ramsey has two grown children, Dorothy and Ernest, who hate Ramsey's second wife Eleanor who has money of her own, but refuses to spend it on supporting their lavish lifestyles.

Eleanor meets with private detective Mike Shayne to hire him to investigate threatening letters she has been receiving. In flashback the viewer sees the details of her home situation.

As Shayne is leaving this meeting, Arnold Ramsey wants a word with him. Insultingly implying that Shayne is on the shady side, Ramsey asks if Shayne will find someone to stage a phony jewelry burglary. He has hatched an insurance fraud scheme in which the actor would break in and find $1000 in an empty jewelry case in his wife's bedroom. Shayne cautiously tells Ramsey he will think it over. At the office Shayne vents his frustration to his secretary Phyllis, but does not see that his old friend, reformed ex-convict, and down on his luck, Joe Darnell and his wife are present in the office and overhear.

Darnell's wife Dora is pregnant, Joe needs $1000, and he anxiously volunteers to play the burglar. Shayne instead offers good advice to stay on the up-and-up, handing him a $50 gift check. However, later that night, Darnell takes it upon himself to go to the Ramsey home, claiming Shayne hired him, and he is accepted by Ramsey. Having set the stage, Ramsey strangles his wife as she sleeps. When Darnell breaks in and arrives in the bedroom, he discovers this and tries to revive her, which provides Ramsey the excuse to shoot and kill him, claiming he caught Darnell in the act of murder. The police believe this lie and close the case.

But Carl Meldrum, an ex-con gigolo dating Dorothy, just happened to be present and witness the actual murder. As a con man, he begins blackmailing Ramsey. Now Ramsey has to kill Meldrum, for which he tries to frame Eleanor's brother Buell Renslow, who was also at odds with her over money. From the beginning Shayne has suspected Ramsey—his work was assembling the proof—and at the end he is able to conclusively show the police who the actual innocent and guilty parties are.

== Cast ==
- Hugh Beaumont as Michael Shayne
- Cheryl Walker as Phyllis Hamilton
- Lyle Talbot as Buell Renslow
- George Meeker as Carl Meldrum
- Pierre Watkin as Arnold Ramsey
- Richard Keene as Tim Rourke
- David Reed as Ernest Ramsey
- Carol Andrews as Mona Tabor
- Julia McMillan as Dorothy Ramsey
- Helene Heigh as Eleanor Renslow Ramsey
- Ralph Dunn as Pete Rafferty
- Parker Garvie as Joe Darnell
- Virginia Christine as Dora Darnell
