= Peter Breck =

American actor (1929–2012)

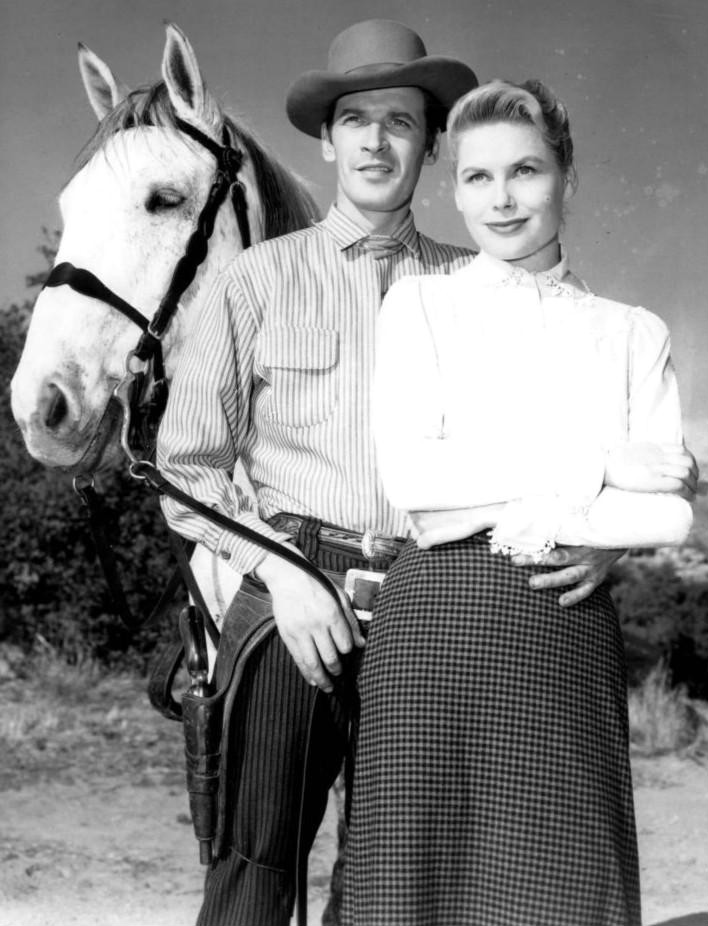
- Breck as Clay Culhane with Anna-Lisa as Nora Travers in Black Saddle in 1959
- Born: Joseph Peter Breck; March 13, 1929; Rochester, New York, U.S.
- Died: February 6, 2012 (aged 82); Vancouver, British Columbia, Canada
- Education: University of Houston
- Occupation: Actor
- Years active: 1956-2002
- Spouse: Diane Breck
- Children: 1

Joseph Peter Breck (March 13, 1929 – February 6, 2012) was an American character actor. The rugged, dark-haired Breck played the gambler and gunfighter Doc Holliday on the ABC/Warner Bros. Television series Maverick as well as Victoria Barkley's (Barbara Stanwyck) hot-tempered middle son Nick in the 1960s ABC/Four Star Western The Big Valley. Breck also had the starring role in an earlier NBC/Four Star Western television series entitled Black Saddle.

== Early years ==
Joseph Peter Breck was born in Rochester, New York. He grew up living with his grandparents in Haverhill, Massachusetts, because they felt they could provide a more stable home environment than his father, who often traveled as a jazz musician. He attended the University of Houston, where he studied English and drama.

== Family ==
Breck was the son of bandleader Joe Breck, who was nicknamed "the Prince of Pep", and whose band once included trombone player Jerry Colonna. His parents divorced when Peter was eight. Peter went with Joe, while his younger brother George accompanied their mother, resulting in a decades-long separation. In 1959, an Associated Press photograph showed the brothers reunited after being out of touch for 22 years. The caption explained: "George told newsmen he saw Peter on television and recognized a resemblance. He went to the actor's studio and the relationship was confirmed."

== Career ==
=== Early career ===
After post-World War II United States Navy service in the 1940s on the aircraft carrier USS Franklin D. Roosevelt (CV-42), Breck played professional basketball for the Rochester Royals during the 1948–49 season. He then worked as a ranch hand while studying drama at the University of Houston, and went on to make his on-screen debut in a 1958 film that was eventually released under the title The Beatniks.

As well as performing in live theatre, Breck had several guest-starring roles on a number of popular series, such as Sea Hunt, several episodes of Wagon Train, Have Gun – Will Travel, Perry Mason, and Gunsmoke (a disturbed cowboy in the 1963 title role in "The Odyssey of Jubal Tanner").

When Robert Mitchum saw Breck in George Bernard Shaw's play The Man of Destiny in Washington, DC, he offered Breck a role as a rival driver in Thunder Road (1958). Mitchum helped Breck to relocate to Los Angeles. As Breck then did not have his own car, Mitchum lent him his Jaguar. Mitchum introduced Breck to Dick Powell, who contracted him to Four Star Productions, where Breck appeared in the CBS Western anthology series, Dick Powell's Zane Grey Theatre.

Breck appeared with fellow guest star Diane Brewster in the 1958 episode "The Lady Gambler" of the ABC Western series, Tombstone Territory, starring Pat Conway and Richard Eastham. That same year, Breck appeared in an episode of the syndicated Highway Patrol, starring Broderick Crawford. He was also cast in an episode of NBC's The Restless Gun, starring John Payne. He appeared in a 1958 episode of Gunsmoke, playing the role of murder suspect, "Fly Hoyt", a cowboy working on a Texas cattle drive. That same year, Breck played the role of a bad guy in an episode of Wagon Train, "The Story of Tobias Jones", opposite Lou Costello.

From January 1959 to May 1960, Breck starred as Clay Culhane, the gunfighter-turned-lawyer in the ABC Western Black Saddle, with secondary roles for Russell Johnson, Anna-Lisa, J. Pat O'Malley, and Walter Burke. Unlike in The Big Valley, in which Breck played an easily angered rancher, he is low-key, restrained, and considerate as the lawyer Culhane.

Breck was later a contract star with Warner Bros. Television, where he appeared as Doc Holliday on Maverick, a part that had been played twice earlier in the series by Gerald Mohr and by Adam West on ABC's Lawman. Breck appeared in several other ABC/WB series of the time, such as Cheyenne, 77 Sunset Strip, The Roaring 20's (as trumpet player Joe Peabody in the episode "Big Town Blues"), and The Gallant Men. He was cast as a young Theodore Roosevelt in the 1961 episode "The Yankee Tornado" of the ABC/WB Western series, Bronco, starring Ty Hardin. "The Yankee Tornado" featured Will Hutchins of the ABC/WB Western series Sugarfoot in a crossover appearance.

Breck's first starring role in a film was Lad, A Dog (1962). The next year, he played the leading roles in both Samuel Fuller's Shock Corridor and the science-fiction horror film The Crawling Hand. He also costarred in the cavalry film The Glory Guys. Between 1963 and 1965, Breck made three guest appearances on Perry Mason, in the roles of Clay Eliott in the 1963 episode "The Case of the Bluffing Blast", defendant William Sherwood in the 1964 episode, "The Case of the Antic Angel", and defendant Peter Warren in the 1965 episode, "The Case of the Gambling Lady". During this time, he appeared on episodes of such television series as Mr. Novak, The Outer Limits, Bonanza and The Virginian.

Breck claimed to have been considered for leads on two successful television series produced by Quinn Martin: The Fugitive (1963) and 12 O'Clock High (1964), with Breck commenting, "If you are a leading man in Hollywood, you either draw $250,000 like Steve McQueen or you had better be in a series."

=== The Big Valley ===
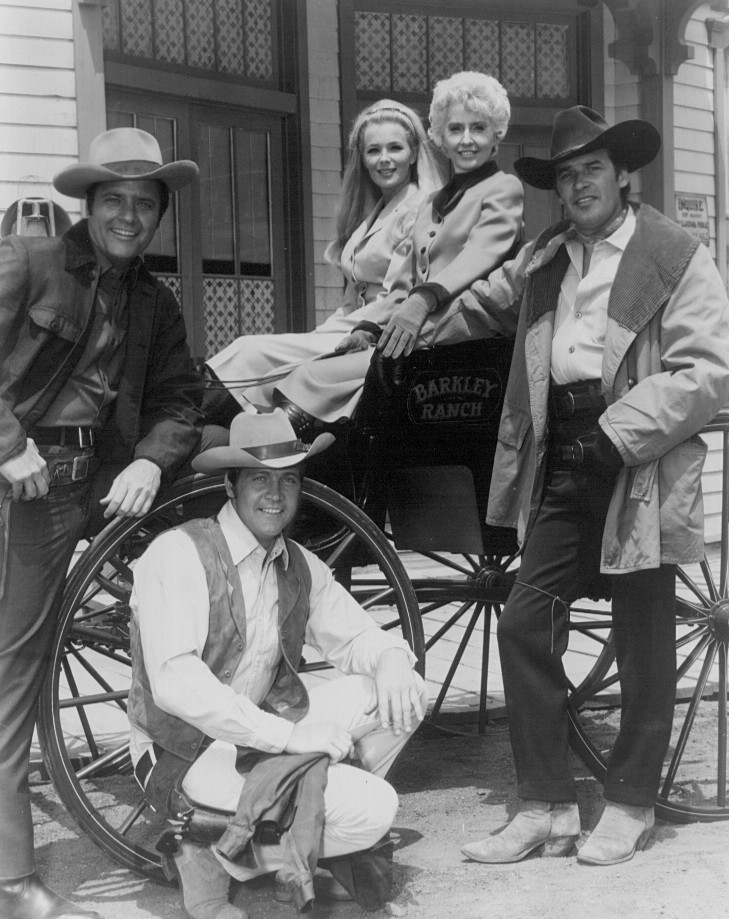
The Big Valley cast with Breck at far right

From 1965 to 1969, Breck starred on The Big Valley as Nick Barkley, foreman of the Barkley ranch and son to Barbara Stanwyck's character, Victoria Barkley. The second of four children, Nick was hot-headed, short-tempered, and very fast with a gun. Always spoiling for a fight and frequently wearing leather gloves, Breck's character took the slightest offense to the Barkley name personally and quickly made his displeasure known, as often with his fists as with his vociferous shouts. Often, this proved to be a mistake, and only through the calming influence of his mother and cooler-headed siblings, Jarrod (Richard Long), half-brother Heath (Lee Majors), sister Audra (Linda Evans), and Eugene (Charles Briles; written out after season one when he was drafted into the Army), would a difficult situation be rectified. Having been a Barbara Stanwyck admirer since the 1940s, when he was a teenager, Breck developed an on- and off-screen chemistry with her, practicing longer lines and even being a ranch foreman on the set. After the series was cancelled, he stayed close to her until her death.

=== After The Big Valley ===
In 1970 he appeared as Lafe Harkness on the TV Western The Men from Shiloh (rebranded name for The Virginian) in the episode titled "Hannah". Most of his roles in the 1970s and 1980s were television guest-starring performances on such series as Alias Smith and Jones, Mission: Impossible, McMillan & Wife, S.W.A.T., The Six Million Dollar Man (again with Lee Majors), The Incredible Hulk, and The Dukes of Hazzard, as well as roles as himself on Fantasy Island, and The Fall Guy which also starred former television "brother" Lee Majors.

In the mid-1980s, Breck moved to Vancouver, British Columbia, Canada, with his wife Diane and their son, Christopher. He was asked by a casting director to teach a weekly class to young actors on film technique. That once-a-week class became a full-time acting school - The Breck Academy - which he operated for 10 years. In 1990, Breck appeared in the Canadian cult film Terminal City Ricochet.

On January 20, 1990, while teaching at the drama school, Breck was notified of Barbara Stanwyck's death. She requested no funeral nor memorial.

In 1991, he appeared as Sham-Ir, the chief of all genies, in the NBC television special I Still Dream of Jeannie, the second reunion film that reunited I Dream of Jeannie TV series co-stars Barbara Eden and Bill Daily, along with Al Waxman and Ken Kercheval.

In the film The Unnamable II: The Statement of Randolph Carter (1993), Breck played Sheriff Hatch.

In 1996, he appeared in an episode of the new version of The Outer Limits.

Breck provided the voice of Farmer Brown in "Critters", a 1998 episode of The New Batman Adventures.

His last television performance was on an episode of John Doe in 2002. Prior to his death, most of his film performances have been in undistributed films that are shown only at film festivals.

== Personal life ==
Breck married dancer Diane Bourne in 1960. (Note: Breck's obituary in The New York Times incorrectly gave his wife's name as Diana rather than Diane.) They had a son, Christopher, who died of leukemia at age 30.

== Death ==
In June 2010, Breck's wife Diane announced on his website that he had been suffering from dementia and could no longer sign autographs for fans, although she said that he still read and enjoyed their letters. Despite this diagnosis, she said he was still physically healthy and did not require medication.

Diane Breck reported that her husband was hospitalized on January 10, 2012. On February 6, 2012, Peter Breck died from his illness at the age of 82 in Vancouver, British Columbia.

== Partial filmography ==
=== Television ===
Year	Title	Role	Notes
1958, 1963	Gunsmoke	Fly Hoyt, Jubal	2 episodes
1958	The Restless Gun	Brett Dixon	Episode: "Take Me Home"
1959–1960	Black Saddle	Clay Culhane	Main role
1964	Bonanza	Ward Bannister	S05E19 "The Cheating Game"
1964, 1970	The Virginian	Jess Carver, Lafe Harkness	2 episodes
1965–1969	The Big Valley	Nick Barkley	Main cast
1972	A Man for Hanging	Avery Porter	Television film
1980	The Incredible Hulk	Hull	Episode: "The Lottery"
1981	The Dukes of Hazzard	J.J. Sunday	Episode: "The Hack of Hazzard"
1982	General Hospital	Masters, head of the WSB	Episode: Summer of 1982 - Sword of Malkuth storyline with Tristan Rogers (Robert Scorpio), Anthony Geary (Luke Spencer)
1998	The New Batman Adventures	Enoch Brown (voice)	Episode: "Critters"

=== Film ===
Year	Title	Role	Notes
1958	Thunder Road	Stacey Gouge	Uncredited
1958	I Want to Live!	Ben Miranda	Uncredited
1959	The Wild and the Innocent	Chip Miller	
1960	The Beatniks	Mooney	
1961	Portrait of a Mobster	Frank Brennan	
1962	Lad, A Dog	Stephen Tremayne	
1963	Hootenanny Hoot	Ted Grover	
1963	The Crawling Hand	Steve Curan	
1963	Shock Corridor	John Barrett	
1965	The Glory Guys	Bunny Hodges	
1974	Benji	Dr. Chapman	
1982	The Sword and the Sorcerer	King Leonidas	
1990	Terminal City Ricochet	Ross Glimore	
1991	Highway 61	Mr. Watson	
1992	The Unnamable II: The Statement of Randolph Carter	Sheriff Hatch	
1995	Decoy	Weillington	
1999	Enemy Action	General Turner	
2004	Jiminy Glick in Lalawood	Tibor	
