= Spaceways =

1953 film by Terence Fisher

- Theatrical release poster
- Directed by: Terence Fisher
- Written by: Paul Tabori; Richard Landau
- Based on: radio play by Charles Eric Maine
- Produced by: Michael Carreras
- Starring: Howard Duff; Eva Bartok; Andrew Osborn; Alan Wheatley
- Cinematography: Reginald H. Wyer; Len Harris
- Edited by: Maurice Rootes
- Music by: Ivor Slaney
- Production company: Hammer Film Productions
- Distributed by: Lippert Pictures (US); Exclusive Films (UK)
- Release dates: July 1953 (U.S.); 21 December 1953 (UK)
- Running time: 74 minutes (US); 76 minutes (UK)
- Country: United Kingdom
- Language: English

Spaceways is a 1953 British science fiction murder mystery directed by Terence Fisher and starring Howard Duff, Eva Bartok and Alan Wheatley. It was produced by Michael Carreras for Hammer Film Productions Ltd. and Lippert Productions Inc., with Robert L. Lippert as uncredited co-producer. The screenplay was written by Paul Tabori and Richard Landau, based on the 1952 radio play by Charles Eric Maine. Jimmy Sangster was the Assistant Director, Les Bowie handled Special Effects, and J. Elder Wills was the Art Director. The film was distributed in the UK by Exclusive Films Ltd. and in the United States by Lippert Pictures.

== Plot ==
Engineer Dr Stephen Mitchell is part of a British space programme that plans to launch an artificial satellite that will permanently orbit Earth. At a cocktail party, it is announced to the programme's staff that the satellite project has been approved by the defence council. Mitchell's wife Vanessa is not enthusiastic about the new project, nor with having to live at its high security base. She sneaks away with Dr Philip Crenshaw, with whom she is having an affair. Dr Mitchell leaves the party with Lisa Frank, a mathematician on the project, who is in love with him. When Mitchell returns home, he has an argument with Vanessa; he has been made aware of her having passionately kissed Crenshaw after she left with him.

The satellite rocket soon launches, but it does not reach its maximum altitude. Afterwards, it is discovered that Crenshaw and Vanessa have disappeared. Dr Smith secretly investigates their disappearance and comes to the conclusion that not only were the two murdered, but that they were murdered by Dr Mitchell, after which he hid their bodies in the spacecraft's fuel tanks. Smith approaches Mitchell with the accusation, while also telling him about Crenshaw being a spy, who had concealed having a degree from a German university.

Mitchell decides to go into space on the second rocket being launched, in order to try to prove his innocence. Smith discovers that there was a new team member added just prior to the disappearance, and that a security guard had died in an accident a week earlier. Soon after, Smith and the police discover that Crenshaw and Vanessa are actually at a seaside cottage and rush to intercept them. Crenshaw has been planning to head to the east instead of going to America, as he previously had said. When Vanessa finds out Crenshaw plans to go to Russia, she refuses to go. Crenshaw tries to persuade her, but she won't agree. Saying that she knows too much for him to leave her behind, Crenshaw takes out a gun, intending to kill her. Smith arrives and tries to stop him, but in the violent scuffle between them the gun goes off and Vanessa is killed.

After the rocket ship launches into space, Mitchell is surprised to see that Lisa is on board; she had previously convinced Toby to let her go on the flight instead of him. Despite the revelation that the bodies of Crenshaw and Vanessa are not on board, Mitchell and Frank attempt to jettison the spaceship's second stage, resulting in an explosion, causing their spacecraft to go out of control. Mitchell, however, releases the fail-safe, saving them from destruction and allowing the spaceship to return safely to Earth.

== Cast ==
- Howard Duff as Dr Stephen Mitchell
- Eva Bartok as Dr Lisa Frank
- Alan Wheatley as Dr Smith
- Philip Leaver as Professor Koepler
- Michael Medwin as Dr Toby Andrews
- Andrew Osborn as Dr Philip Crenshaw
- Cecile Chevreau as Vanessa Mitchell
- Anthony Ireland as General Hayes
- Hugh Moxey as Colonel Alfred Daniels
- David Horne as Minister

== Production ==
Principal photography took place at Bray Studios, Windsor, England from November 17, 1952 to mid-January 1953. Some of the scenes of the spaceship taking off were special effects shots taken from the Robert Lippert film, Rocketship X-M (1950) Some filming also occurred at Bray Studios in Berkshire.

== Critical reception ==
The film disappointed science fiction fans who claimed it had too much "murder mystery" in it and not enough science fiction. Historian Tom Johnson opined "The film was hampered by cheap sets, stock footage, a dull lead hero and a lack of action." Glenn Erickson, writing in DVD Savant, noted: "The disappointment of Spaceways is finding out that it is really a lukewarm murder mystery in a science fiction setting".

Monthly Film Bulletin said: "The first British science-fiction picture is a dull and shoddy affair. Too much footage is wasted on a kind of poor man's version of The Net, and the gadgetry and adventures when they do come are ludicrous and unexciting. Eva Bartok's mathematician may please the connoisseurs."

Kine Weekly said: "Interplanetary melodrama, artfully coloured by pseudo-scientific jargon and detail. ... There is not a great deal of action during the first half, but the shrewd deployment of interesting and widely assorted types rivets the attention until the space-ship finally comes into its own. ... One of many, but better than most '"aerial extravaganzas," it'll entertain youngsters of all ages."

Variety wrote: "Terence Fisher's direction is extremely methodical, as is the playing, and script constantly betrays its radio play origin by running to long sides of static dialog. Very little excitement is whipped up, although the finale rocket flight and danger to the hero and heroine, has a fair amount of suspense. ... Picture needs considerable editorial tightening."

Boxoffice said: "The offering is believably plotted and capably enacted, while from the production standpoint the values of the piece are considerably bolstered by the injection of what appear to be authentic clips of rocket takeoff and flight. ...To appeal to feminine audiences, a logical romantic thread has been woven into the story."

Picturegoer wrote: "This is the first British entry in the current cycle of science-fiction. And a pretty effective job it is, too. ... It is, of course, a melodrama-and-hokum sandwich, but I found it worth a bite."

In British Sound Films: The Studio Years 1928–1959 David Quinlan rated the film as “mediocre” and wrote: "Pretty lame British entry into science-fiction."

The Radio Times Guide to Films gave the film 1/5 stars, writing: "Why did anybody who read the radio play on which this is based think it was worth doing anything with it other than hurl it across the room? The plot has leads Howard Duff and Eva Bartok blasting off in pursuit of a satellite to prove Duff's innocence following an accusation of double murder. Terence Fisher's funereal pace kills this cheaply-made picture stone dead long before the dénouement."
