= Michael Hennagin =

American classical composer

Michael Hennagin (17 September 1936 – 4 June 1993) was an American composer and university professor.

== Life and career ==
Hennagin was born in The Dalles, Oregon. He studied composition at the Curtis Institute of Music in Philadelphia and at summer festivals in Aspen and Tanglewood. His composition teachers included Darius Milhaud and Aaron Copland.

Hennagin began his professional career as a Hollywood composer and arranger working in film and television. He composed in all media, and music for both instrumental and vocal ensembles, including frequently performed pieces for choir, symphonic band and orchestra, and percussion ensemble. Notable compositions include soundtracks for The DuPont Show of the Week and the television series Voyage to the Bottom of the Sea, ballet scores for the Lester Horton Dance Theater in Los Angeles, and his Duo Chopinesque for Percussion Ensemble and Walking on the Green Grass for Choir are performed frequently. His compositions are published by Walton Music, Southern Music Company, and Boosey and Hawkes.

He received awards from American Society of Composers, Authors and Publishers (ASCAP) recognizing his continued commercial influence and success, and he was named National Composer of the Year in 1975 by the Music Teachers National Association. He was commissioned several times by the Gregg Smith Singers. Shortly before his death, Ohio State University honored him with a week-long festival and he traveled to New York City where The Gregg Smith Singers premiered a new choral work at Carnegie Hall.

He came to the University of Oklahoma in 1972 where he was composer-in-residence and taught composition until his retirement in 1992. The Michael Hennagin Prize in Composition is awarded biennially by the University of Oklahoma. He retired, in part, to devote more time to his composing and accept new commissions. For his last work, "Proud Music," he returned to the poetry of Walt Whitman, combining the texts of "Proud Music of the Storm" and "I Hear America Singing".

Hennagin died suddenly in his home, at the age of 56, on 11 June 1993.

== Students ==
- Ted Hammond, veterinarian and amusement park consultant
- Jas Miller, composer, recording artist, teacher, author, San Diego, CA
- Dr. Cheryl Bates, University of Houston, DMA (Music Education); University of North Texas PhD music theory in progress; Lone Star College – Tomball (retired professor of music)
- Dr. Roland Barrett, Director of the School of Music, University of Oklahoma
- Joseph Blaha, Roanoke College
- Nancy Cobb-Lippens, Director of the School of Music, Florida Gulf Coast University
- Richard Ford, composer
- Ted Hammond, veterinarian and amusement park consultant
- Corey A. Jackson, composer
- Carvin Knowles, composer
- Anthony Lis, South Dakota State University
- Casey McClure, Internet Marketing Specialist, Advanced Academics, Inc.
- Stephen Sewell, Composer
- Paul Steinberg, Director of the Center for New Music Resources at Crane School
- rogerallenward, composer
- Mark Wilder, composer
- Blake Wilkins, University of Houston
- Stephen L. Yarbrough, University of South Dakota

== The Michael Hennagin Prize in Composition recipients ==
The Michael Hennagin Prize in Composition is awarded biennially by the University of Oklahoma.

- 2005 Éric Champagne, Champ-de-Mars, par jour de lumière
- 2003 Christopher Palestrant, Lesbia Catulli
- 2001 Joseph Blaha, The Night Watch
- 1999 Dana Wilson, Primal Worlds
