= Charles Eric Maine =

English writer (1921–1981)

David McIlwain (21 January 1921 – 30 November 1981) better known by his pen name, Charles Eric Maine, was an English writer best known for several science fiction serials published in the 1950s and 1960s. He also wrote detective thrillers under the pen names Richard Rayner and Robert Wade.

== Biography ==
Maine was born in Liverpool, England on 21 January 1921. His writing career began with publishing three issues of a science fiction magazine called The Satellite which he co-edited along with J. F. Burke. From 1940 to 1941, he published his own magazine, called Gargoyle. During World War II, he was in the Royal Air Force and served in Northern Africa in 1943.

After the war, he worked in TV engineering and became involved in editorial work for radio and TV. During 1952, he sold his first radio play, Spaceways, to the BBC. Due to its popularity, it became a novel as well as a movie.

One of his best-known novels, Timeliner, was about a scientist who experiments with a time machine, only to be maliciously thrust into the future by a fellow scientist who was having an affair with his wife. It was originally written as a radio play known as The Einstein Highway.

Maine died on 30 November 1981 in London, England.

== Bibliography ==
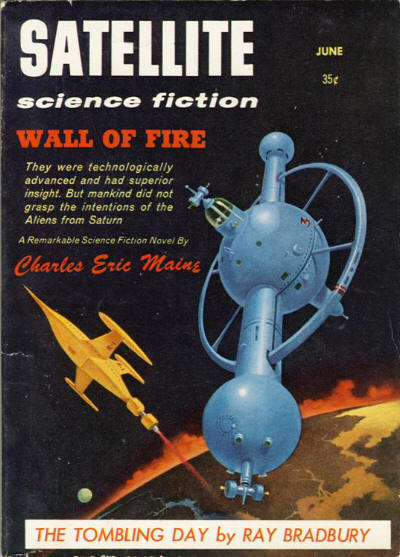
Maine's 1955 novel, Crisis 2000, saw its first American publication as the cover story for the June 1958 issue of Satellite Science Fiction, under the title "Wall of Fire"

- Spaceways (1953) (variant title: Spaceways Satellite)
- Highway J (1953) (reprinted in anthology: Other Worlds, Other Times, 1969)
- Crisis 2000 (1955 UK, 1959 US)
- Timeliner (1955)
- Escapement (1956) (variant title: The Man Who Couldn't Sleep)
- High Vacuum (1956)
- The Tide Went Out (1958) (revised in 1977 with variant title: Thirst!)
- World Without Men (1958) (revised in 1972 with variant title: Alph)
- Count-Down (1959) (variant title: Fire Past the Future)
- Subterfuge (1959)
- Calculated Risk (1960)
- He Owned the World (1960) (variant title: The Man Who Owned the World)
- The Mind of Mr. Soames (1961)
- The Darkest of Nights (1962) (variant title: Survival Margin)
- B.E.A.S.T. (1966)
- World-Famous Mistresses (1970)
- Alph (1972)

== Movies ==
- Spaceways (1953)
- The Electronic Monster (1958) (from novel Escapement)
- Timeslip (1956; it was the basis for a later novel, The Isotope Man)
- The Mind of Mr. Soames (1970)
