= Dear Liar =

Play

Dear Liar, full title Dear Liar: A Comedy of Letters is a play by American actor, director, and playwright Jerome Kilty. It was first staged in 1957 and published in 1960. A television adaptation was made in 1964, directed by David Gardner for National Educational Television. Two film adaptations were later created, one in English by director Gordon Rigsby in 1981 and another in French as Cher menteur (meaning Dear liar) in 1982 by French director Alexandre Tarta.

== The play ==
The play is based on the correspondence between famed playwright George Bernard Shaw and actress Mrs. Patrick Campbell. In the play written by Kilty, two actors duel with each other as they act on the letters exchanged between Shaw and Mrs. Campbell. In 1960, Dodd, Mead & Company published the play under the title Dear Liar: A Comedy of Letters adapted by Jerome Kilty from the Correspondence of Bernard Shaw and Mrs. Patrick Campbell.

The play was staged first in Chicago in 1957. A production by Guthrie McClintic and Sol Hurok, starring Katharine Cornell and Brian Aherne and directed by Jerome Kilty, had its world premiere on March 3, 1959 at the Sombrero Playhouse in Phoenix, Arizona. It then went on a national tour, arriving in New York on March 17, 1960. The play had a very successful run in New York. It was later staged in London for the first time in 1963. After London showings, in 1964 Kilty and his wife, actress Cavada Humphry, made a world tour with the play.

== Television adaptation ==
In 1964, the U.S.-based National Educational Television (NET) staged Dear Liar as a two-character play on its series NET Playhouse. The television staging was directed by David Gardner based on Jerome Kilty's work and starred Zoe Caldwell and Barry Morse.

== Film adaptations ==
=== Dear Liar ===
Dear Liar
- Directed by: Gordon Rigsby
- Written by: Jerome Kilty
- Starring: Jane Alexander; Edward Herrmann
- Release date: 1981 (USA)
- Country: USA
- Language: English

The play was brought to the screen in 1981 by the director Gordon Rigsby with the lead roles by Jane Alexander as Mrs. Patrick Campbell and Edward Herrmann as George Bernard Shaw.

=== Cher menteur ===
Cher menteur
- Directed by: Alexandre Tarta
- Written by: Jean Cocteau; Jerome Kilty
- Starring: Jean Marais; Edwige Feuillère
- Release date: 22 February 1982 (France)
- Running time: 105 minutes
- Country: France
- Language: French

A 1960 adaptation in French was written by Jean Cocteau under the title Cher menteur (Dear Liar).

The 1982 film directed by Alexandre Tarta had in lead roles Edwige Feuillère as Mrs. Patrick Campbell and Jean Marais as George Bernard Shaw.
