= Battle in Outer Space =

1959 film

- Theatrical release poster

Japanese name
- Kanji: 宇宙大戦争
Transcriptions
- Revised Hepburn: Uchū Daisensō
- Directed by: Ishirō Honda
- Screenplay by: Shinichi Sekizawa
- Story by: Jotaro Okami
- Produced by: Tomoyuki Tanaka
- Starring: Ryō Ikebe; Kyōko Anzai; Minoru Takada; Koreya Senda; Leonard Stanford; Harold Conway; Hisaya Itô; Yoshio Tsuchiya
- Cinematography: Hajime Koizumi
- Edited by: Ichiji Taira
- Music by: Akira Ifukube
- Production company: Toho
- Release date: December 26, 1959 (Japan)
- Running time: 93 minutes
- Country: Japan
- Languages: Japanese; English

Battle in Outer Space (宇宙大戦争, Uchū Daisensō; lit. 'The Great Space War') is a 1959 Japanese science fiction action film directed by Ishirō Honda, with special effects by Eiji Tsuburaya.

Battle in Outer Space was released in Japan on 26 December 1959. It was released in the United States on June 10, 1960 in an English-dubbed version by Columbia Pictures where it was double billed with 12 to the Moon (1960). In some areas, it was shown with either 13 Ghosts (1960) or The Electronic Monster (1958).

== Plot ==
In 1965, a series of mysterious and devastating incidents are happening on Earth. These incidents range from a railroad bridge levitated off the ground causing a train wreck in Japan; an ocean liner lifted out of the Panama Canal by a waterspout, destroying it; severe flooding in Venice, Italy; and the destruction of the J-SS3 space station.

A UN-connected international meeting is called at the Space Research Center in Japan. Major Ichiro Katsumiya, Professor Adachi and Dr. Richardson open the conference and describe the disasters, adding that the survivors suffered from extreme frostbite. Dr. Richardson theorizes that some unknown force lowered the temperatures of the objects so as to lower the Earth's gravitational pull, thus making the objects easier to lift, regardless of their size and weight. Katsumiya determines that such an action could only be accomplished by a force beyond the Earth.

Dr. Ahmed, an Iranian delegate at the meeting, reacts as though suffering from a severe headache and slips away. Ahmed walks outside to a courtyard in a daze. Etsuko Shiraishi sees him and watches in horror as he is enveloped in a red light coming from the sky. Astronaut Iwamura comes in and Etsuko tells him what happened but Ahmed is nowhere to be seen. Back at the conference, it is believed that aliens might be behind the disasters and it is suggested that the Earth be prepared militarily.

Dr. Ahmed appears and tries to sabotage the heat ray experiments held at the meeting. He is caught before completing his mission. He briefly takes Etsuko hostage and warns that the Earth will soon become a colony of the planet Natal. Ahmed's hand is injured and he makes a run for it. However, a Natal saucer appears near the center and vaporizes him, but forensics find a tiny radio transmitter that was put in him. The transmissions locate the suspect aliens on the Moon.

The UN decides to launch two rocket ships, called SPIPs, to the Moon on a reconnaissance mission. En route, both ships are attacked by remotely controlled meteors called 'space torpedoes'. Iwamura, the navigator of SPIP-1, is also under mind control by the aliens, and is tasked with sabotaging SPIP-1's engines, but he is apprehended by the crew and tied up. Both SPIPs avoid the meteors and are given a warning by the Natal not to land on the Moon, but it is ignored. Once the rockets land on the Moon, the two teams look for the alien base in lunar rovers. Meanwhile, Iwamura unties himself and destroys SPIP-1. They find a cave on foot and locate the Natal base in a deep crater. Etsuko is temporarily captured by the Natal but is rescued by Katsumiya. A beam weapon battle erupts as the teams attack the base. The Natal base is destroyed, freeing Iwamura from the aliens' mind control. Deciding to stay behind as penance for his acts of sabotage, Iwamura provides covering fire for his comrades as they escape the Moon aboard SPIP-2.

Back on Earth, the world prepares for a final conflict against the Natal. FFE Space Fighters (based on the North American X-15 experimental rocket plane) and Atomic Heat Cannons are built to counter the invasion fleet. Eventually, the Natal saucers and their mothership approach Earth. Squadrons of Scout Ships (converted into Space Fighters) are sent up into space and engage in a massive dogfight with the saucers. The Natal mothership launches Space Torpedoes that hit New York and San Francisco, destroying a large area of New York and toppling the Golden Gate Bridge. Having successfully made it past the FFE Space Fighters, the mothership descends upon Tokyo and wreaks havoc using its tractor beam, freezing buildings solid before ripping them from the ground. As the mothership and its remaining escorts bear down on the Space Research Center, the facility's Atomic Heat Cannons manage to shoot it down, ending the Natal's attempted invasion of Earth.

== Cast ==
- Ryô Ikebe as Major Ichiro Katsumiya
- Kyôko Anzai as Etsuko Shiraishi
- Minoru Takada as The Commander
- Koreya Senda as Professor Senda
- Len Stanford as Dr. Roger Richardson
- Harold Conway as Dr. Immerman
- Hisaya Itô as Kogure
- Yoshio Tsuchiya as Iwamura

== Production ==
=== Writing ===
Developed as a story proposal in 1957 by Jojiro Okami, the film underwent four script drafts by Shinichi Sekizawa. Though the characters of Dr. Adachi, Dr. Immerman, and Etsuko (the same names of characters that appear prominently in The Mysterians) exist in the finished film, it is believed in the first draft they were to be the exact same characters as those from The Mysterians carried over. This element was likely present in the story pitch by Jojiro Okami, who had gotten the ball rolling with The Mysterians as well. Apparently, the final script just kept the names and they are not meant to be the same characters.

In the second draft of the screenplay, instead of the aliens controlling Dr. Achmed, shadowy alien specters infiltrate the space center and spy on the conference. In one scene, Etsuko is working in her office and is startled by the appearance of a specter-like alien spy. When the alien leaves the room, her paperwork flies all over the place. In another scene, Katsumiya spots what appears a small tree outside his quarters, but is in fact another alien spy. One of the alien spies was to appear before the conference meeting. These ideas were scrapped because they would have required several optical effects; it was decided that the aliens would use mind control on humans to do their dirty work.

In one of the original scripts, there were scenes where the crew-members ate their meals in a cafeteria on the rocket ship. In the battle with the space torpedoes, the plates and food were to be tossed all over.

Storyboards for an unused scene had the human astronauts spot a flying saucer go through a tunnel, leading them to the alien base.

Originally the Natarl attack the Earth's forces with their own land based vehicles on the Moon. These vehicles, which resembled yellow pill bugs with antennas, did not make it into the final version, and instead the Natarl flying saucers appear during this sequence to attack. Originally in one of the early drafts, the Panama Canal and Venice were to be destroyed in a fairly major effects scene, but it was decided to save money by using paintings. Early designs for the Natarl aliens were insectoid, as they had six tentacle-like arms and only one eye.

In an early version of the story illustrated in the storyboards is a more interesting version of the encounter with the Natarl base. Instead of the astronauts keeping their distance and avoiding direct contact with the aliens, Katsumiya takes a strike team inside the Natarl base and succeeds destroying it from within. However, the imagery was totally reminiscent of the alien base from The Mysterians (1957), and building extra sets would have been too costly and repetitive.

In an earlier draft of the script, the Natarl Mothership's anti-gravity beam was used to destroy the Eiffel Tower in Paris, the Kremlin in Moscow, and the Golden Gate Bridge. But in the end the anti-gravity beam is used for Tokyo. In the original scenario, a single Natarl flying saucer destroyed Tokyo with the anti-gravity ray instead of the mothership. The original plan was that the alien mothership would never approach the Earth, but this was changed by Eiji Tsuburaya during shooting.

=== Filming ===
The exterior shots for the Space Research Center was the National Sports Center built for the Tokyo Olympiad in 1964. Interior shots were shot on sets back at Toho.

The slow motion, gravity-stricken walk of the cast on the Moon was an idea from actor Yoshio Tsuchiya. Actor Ryo Ikebe uncharacteristically protested, declaring it was "just a movie" at the idea of the slow-motion walk. However, Ishiro Honda ended up siding with Tsuchiya. The incident did not sour Ikebe, though, who worked again with Honda a few years later on Gorath (1962).

When Apollo 11 landed on the Moon on July 20, 1969, ten years after this film was released, Eiji Tsuburaya watched the “Great Leap for Mankind” on live television. Shortly afterwards, he later told Sadamasa Arikawa, “We were right, our special effects team did a great job. Now, we can hold our heads before the public.”

=== Special effects ===
The beginning of the film shows three flying saucers traveling though space while the credits roll across the screen. These scenes were taken with the camera platform and the saucers attached to an overhead rail that move them both along at the same speed past the outer space backdrop.

The tunnel in the ray gun test chamber was achieved by using a backdrop painting done in forced perspective making it look like an endless tunnel.

To film the two SPIP rocketships flying up into the sky, the two six-foot miniatures were radio-controlled and launched from under a bridge suspended 100 feet (30 meters) above the ground at Miura Point, connecting the cities of Miura City and Jōgashima.

For the miniature wire-work, it was the job of Fumio Nakashiro, who used thin piano wires ranging from 0.1, 0.2 and 0.25 millimeters. They were painted to blend in with the background of outer space, but they can sometimes be seen when in front of a sky background.

The air jets effects for the Moon rovers was created using a water spray.

To simulate buildings being torn and thrown up into the air, miniatures were mostly made of lightweight materials such as cardboard, wafer-thin paraffin, gypsum and Styrofoam which was pre-cut and assembled. Some pieces were trained on the miniature set, blowing everything upwards thanks to multiple compressed air tanks underneath the set. The soldiers falling upward was achieved with a camera moving over the actors, and then superimposing them over the miniature action via a traveling matte.

== Release ==
Battle in Outer Space was released in Japan on 26 December 1959. It was released in the United States on June 10, 1960 in an English-dubbed version by Columbia Pictures where it was double billed with 12 to the Moon (1960). The North American release was reasonably popular earning around $600,000.

== Reception ==
New York Times film critic Howard Thompson gave Battle in Outer Space a mixed, but generally positive review, stating, "The plot is absurd and is performed in dead earnest... some of the artwork is downright nifty, especially in the middle portion, when an earth rocket soars to the moon to destroy the palpitating missile base... the Japanese have opened a most amusing and beguiling bag of technical tricks, as death-dealing saucers whiz through the stratosphere... and the lunar landscape is just as pretty as it can be."

Boxoffice magazine rated the film much more highly, hailing it a "science-fiction adventure drama on a grand scale... and spectacular special effects... can be exploited to attract the youngsters and mature action fans in huge numbers. Like similar Japanese-made thrillers, 'Rodan', 'H-Man' and 'The Mysterians' (all produced by Toho), this can pay off boxoffice-wise if exhibitors stress the amazingly realistic trick photography of flying saucers, moon exploration and a full-scale attack on U.S. cities which results in skyscrapers being destroyed, etc..." and makes note of the film's "explosive action, of which there is plenty, particularly in the climactic battle..." Boxoffice also cited Shinichi Sekizawa's "imaginative screenplay."

== Bibliography ==
- Galbraith IV, Stuart (1996). The Japanese Filmography: 1900 through 1994. McFarland. ISBN 0786400323.
- Ragone, August (2007, 2014) Eiji Tsuburaya: Master of Monsters San Francisco, CA: Chronicle Books. ISBN 9780811860789.
