= Jerome Kilty =

American actor and playwright

Kilty in 1970

Jerome Timothy Kilty (June 24, 1922 in Baltimore, Maryland – September 6, 2012) was an American actor and playwright. He wrote Dear Liar: A Comedy of Letters. He worked extensively on the stage, both in the United States and abroad.

== Career ==
Kilty has written a number of notable plays including:

=== Dear Liar ===
Dear Liar, full title Dear Liar: A Comedy of Letters is a play by Kilty that had a successful run in New York, which was based on the correspondence of famed playwright George Bernard Shaw and actress Mrs. Patrick Campbell. In the play, two actors duel with each other as they act on the letters exchanged between Shaw and Mrs. Campbell.

It was staged in Chicago in 1957. The New York shows launched on March 17, 1960 with Katherine Cornell and Brian Aherne. It was staged in London for the first time in 1963. After London showings, in 1964 Kilty and his wife, actress Cavada Humphrey made a world tour.

The play was brought to the screen in 1981 by the director Gordon Rigsby with the lead roles by Jane Alexander as Mrs. Patrick Campbell and Edward Herrmann as George Bernard Shaw.

An adaptation in French was written by Jean Cocteau under the title Cher menteur (Dear Liar). The film directed by Alexandre Tarta had in lead roles Edwige Feuillère as Mrs. Patrick Campbell and Jean Marais as George Bernard Shaw.

=== Other plays ===
His other notable plays include:

- Dear Love, a love story based on the poems and letters of Robert and Elizabeth Barrett Browning;
- The Ides of March, dealing with the actions and events surrounding the end of the Roman Empire;
- The Little Black Book, wherein a lawyer falls in love with girl number 134 from his little black book.
- Look Away, is a play based on the book, Mary Todd Lincoln, by Justin and Linda Levitt, set in an insane asylum exploring the title character's life. Starring Geraldine Page, it closed after 24 previews and just one performance, but Maya Angelou was nominated for a Tony Award for Best Featured Actress in a Play.

In the early days of American television, Kilty acted in a number of programs, including The United States Steel Hour, Kraft Television Theatre, The Alcoa Hour, Studio One, and Hallmark Hall of Fame.

== Tours ==
Kilty and Humphrey toured the world performing Dear Liar: A Comedy of Letters, beginning in 1964. They were also the first duo to internationally tour in the play Who's Afraid of Virginia Woolf?.

Controversy in South Africa

Who's Afraid of Virginia Woolf? was also performed in South Africa. At the insistence of playwright Edward Albee, Virginia Woolf was to be presented only before integrated audiences. The play opened in Port Elizabeth and then moved to Durban, receiving strong reviews (favorable and unfavorable) in both cities, with a more negative response in Durban, where one critic called it "dirt-laden debris". In the less provincial, more cosmopolitan Johannesburg, the press was more encouraging. But people who may or may not have seen the show expressed their outrage in letters to the government. In response, Jan de Klerk, South Africa's then Minister of the Interior ordered that performances be suspended in Johannesburg while waiting for a report from the official Board of Censors to ensure that the play was "not contrary to public interest or good morals", in effect banning the play.

== Personal life ==
He was born in Baltimore, Maryland of Irish descent on his father's side, but raised on the Pala Indian Reservation, San Diego County, California. On May 11, 1956, he wed actress Cavada Humphrey (June 17, 1919 – July 11, 2007), who was three years his senior. Humphrey died in 2007, at the age of 88. Kilty died on September 6, 2012
