= Timeliner =

1955 novel by Charles Eric Maine

- First edition
- Author: Charles Eric Maine
- Language: English
- Genre: Science fiction
- Publisher: Hodder & Stoughton
- Publication date: 1955
- Publication place: United Kingdom
- Media type: Print (Hardcover)
- Pages: 192 pp

Timeliner is a 1955 science fiction novel by British writer Charles Eric Maine. It was first published in the UK by Hodder & Stoughton; a paperback version by Bantam Books appeared the following year.

The story was originally written as a radio play called The Einstein Highway and was broadcast on the Light Programme of the BBC on 21 February 1954.

== Synopsis ==
Timeliner is a time travel story. A scientist working with "dimensional quadrature" is flung forward in time, to a period where his consciousness ousts that of another man. When that man dies, the protagonist leaps forward again, and so on. In each case, the personality he replaces belongs to a person who is close to a woman who resembles his wife.

== Critical reception ==
Damon Knight wrote of the novel:

Timeliner, by Charles Eric Maine, is that sort of amateur flight of fancy that takes leave of its premises, and its senses, in the second chapter. Almost anything can then happen except the unexpected.

Groff Conklin, reviewing the novel in Galaxy, dismissed it as "without doubt one of the most inconsequential science fiction novels ever written." Anthony Boucher dismissed Timeliner as an example of "mere cliche-museums". P. Schuyler Miller more charitably noted that the novel "doesn't quite meet current standards."
