= Ramshackle Inn =

Play by George Batson

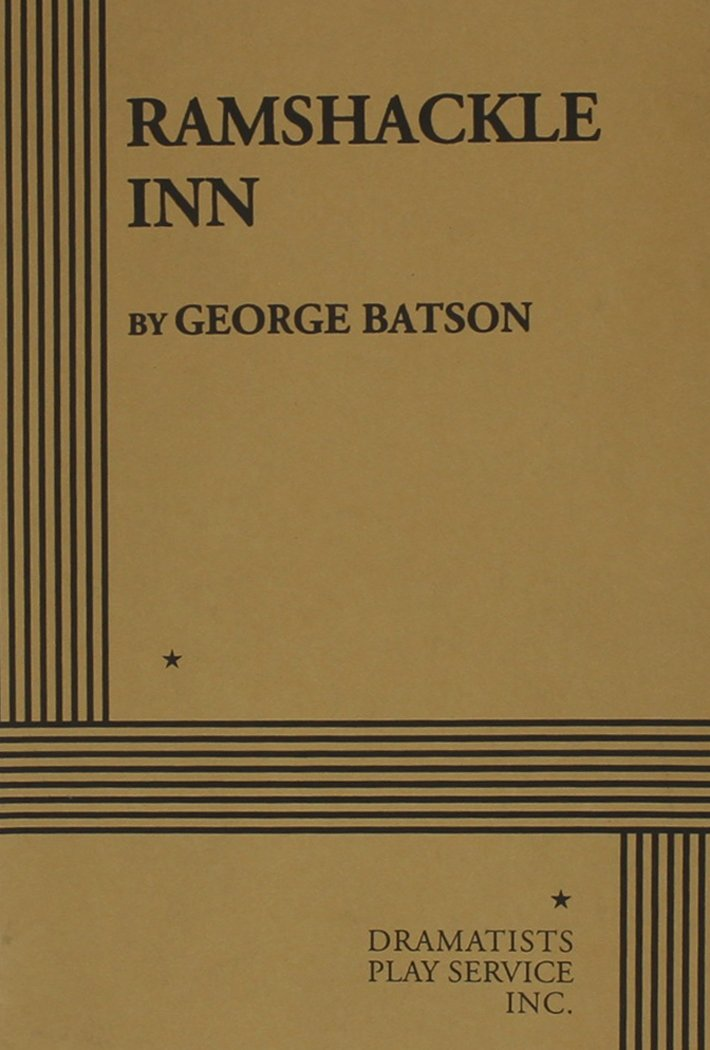
- 1944 edition
- Original language: English
- Written by: George Batson
- Subject: Melodramatic farce about a spinster foiling a Rum Running gang.
- Genre: Comedy
- Setting: Lobby of Ye Olde Colonial Inn during a stormy evening.

Premiere
- Date: January 5, 1944
- Place: Royale Theatre, New York City
- Directed by: Arthur Sircom

Ramshackle Inn is a three-act play, written by George Batson, revised by Owen Davis, and staged by Arthur Sircom. It is a comedy, a melodramatic farce, with a medium-sized cast, moderate pacing, and only one setting. The action takes place during two hours of a stormy evening in the lobby of a dilapidated inn along the seacoast near Gloucester, Massachusetts.

The play was produced by Robert Reud; settings were by Frederick Fox and costumes by Peggy Clark. Despite much critical skepticism, it was a moderate box office success on Broadway, running for 216 performances during early 1944. It then went on tour, and was played in community and regional theater during the 1950s, but has not had a Broadway revival.

== Characters ==
Characters are listed in order of appearance within their scope.

Leads

- Patton is the sinister manager and handyman at the Inn.
- Joyce Rogers is the undercover name for female FBI agent Matilda Janeway.
- Mame Phillips is a hard-drinking middle-aged woman, the previous owner of the Inn.
- Belinda Pryde is a Vermont librarian, middle-aged and a spinster.

Supporting

- Constable Small is an elected constable, honest but pompous and unobservent.
- Bill Phillips is Mame's handsome twenty-five-year-old son, a former bank teller falsely convicted of theft.
- Mary Temple is a pretty twenty-two year old local girl. She and Bill were a couple before his arrest.

Featured

- Arbothnot is an undercover FBI agent who quickly becomes a very mobile corpse.
- Lucius Towser Belinda's beau for twenty years; he is styled "Commodore", but just owns a small coaster.
- Dr. Russell is a slick young physician.
- Alice Fisher is a beautiful young blonde whom the Russells bring into the Inn.
- Gail Russell is supposedly the young wife of Dr. Russell.
- Mr. Temple is a middle-aged banker, former employer of Bill Phillips, whom Mary Temple calls "Uncle Thad".
- Gilhooley is a local police sergeant, assisting Constable Small.
- Fred Porter is the local chief of police.

== Synopsis ==
The Philadelphia Inquirer critic Linton Martin noted "'Ramshackle Inn' is the cluttered and confusing kind of play that would be difficult and dangerous to describe in detail". Reviewer Bill Hill stated "To reduce to sentence form any of the action of this play would be pointless".

Belinda Pryde, having read Grand Hotel, longs to own a similar rendezvous for interesting people. She settles for buying, sight unseen, Ye Olde Colonial Inn on the New England seacoast from its perpetually inebriated owner. It turns out to be a rundown, vermin-infested shambles, tenanted by a murderous liquor-cutting gang, kidnappers, undercover FBI agents and soon after her arrival, a growing number of corpses. Sinister folks, some toting bodies, sidle in and out of the lobby's ten doorways, while Miss Pryde stalks and is stalked. By play's end she has captured all the crooks still living and proved the innocence of the unjustly accused son of the previous owner so he can marry his sweetheart.

== Original production ==
=== Background ===
George Batson, a former automat busboy then serving in the US Army Signal Corps, wrote the play in 1942 expressly for ZaSu Pitts. Robert Reud announced on October 21, 1943, that he would produce and Arthur Sircom direct ZaSu Pitts in the play.

By October 29, 1943, Frederick Fox had been signed to design the sets. Producer Reud started rehearsals at the Ritz Theater on November 2, 1943, though casting was still ongoing. Corporal Batson, stationed at Fort Monmouth, had to apply for a pass from his commanding officer to attend the tryout.

=== Cast ===
Cast during tryouts in Boston, Philadelphia, Norfolk, Richmond, and the original Broadway run
Role	Actor	Dates	Notes
Patton	Paul Huber	Nov 22, 1943 - Dec 18, 1943	Huber was replaced after the Philadelphia tryout.
Patton	Joe Downing	Dec 27, 1943 - Jul 08, 1944	Downing came into the cast with the Norfolk tryout.
Joyce Rogers	Dorothy Mackaill	Nov 22, 1943 - Dec 18, 1943	Mackaill left after the Philadelphia tryout.
Joyce Rogers	Ruth Holden	Dec 27, 1943 - Feb 13, 1944	Holden joined the cast with the Norfolk tryout.
Joyce Rogers	Margaret Callahan	Feb 15, 1944 - Jul 08, 1944	
Mame Phillips	Luella Gear	Nov 22, 1943 - Dec 29, 1944	Gear, heavily promoted in ads, chose to leave after the Norfolk tryout.
Mame Phillips	Ruth Gates	Dec 31, 1943 - Feb 13, 1944	Gates joined the cast in Richmond with just 24 hours notice.
Mame Phillips	Cora Witherspoon	Feb 15, 1944 - Jul 08, 1944	
Belinda Pryde	ZaSu Pitts	Nov 22, 1943 - Jul 08, 1944	This was her first stage role on the East Coast and Broadway.
Constable Small	Harlan Briggs	Nov 22, 1943 - Mar 04, 1944	
Constable Small	Will H. Philbrick	Mar 06, 1944 - Mar 24, 1944	
Constable Small	William Nunn	Mar 26, 1944 - Apr 23, 1944	
Constable Small	Harlan Briggs	Apr 25, 1944 - Jul 08, 1944	
Bill Phillips	William Barrett	Nov 22, 1943 - Dec 18, 1943	
Bill Phillips	William Blees	Dec 27, 1943 - Mar 24, 1944	
Bill Phillips	Richard Basehart	Mar 26, 1943 - Jul 08, 1944	
Mary Temple	Mary Barthelmess	Nov 22, 1943 - Jul 08, 1944	She was the daughter of actor Richard Barthelmess.
Mr. Cosgrove	John Souther	Nov 22, 1943 - Dec 18, 1943	This character was dropped after the Philadelphia tryout, and Souther left the cast.
Arbothnot	George Spelvin	Dec 27, 1943 - Dec 29, 1944	This character was added with the Norfolk tryout, but Spelvin only lasted until the Richmond tryout.
Arbothnot	Mason Curry	Dec 31, 1943 - Jul 08, 1944	Curry became "the most mobile corpse on Broadway2 with this part.
Lucius Towser	Watson White	Nov 22, 1943 - Dec 18, 1943	
Lucius Towser	Ralph Theadore	Dec 27, 1943 - Jul 08, 1944	
Dr. Russell	Hall Shelton	Nov 22, 1943 - Dec 18, 1943	
Dr. Russell	Richard Rober	Dec 27, 1943 - Jul 08, 1944	
Gail Russell	Helene Heigh	Nov 22, 1943 - Jul 08, 1944	
Alice Fisher	Maurine Alexander	Nov 22, 1943 - Jul 08, 1944	
Mr. Temple	Royal Dana Tracy	Nov 22, 1943 - Jul 08, 1944	
Gilhooley	Robert Toms	Nov 22, 1943 - Jul 08, 1944	
Fred Porter	John Lorenz	Nov 22, 1943 - Jul 08, 1944	

=== Tryouts ===
The first tryout opened in Boston at the Wilbur Theatre on November 22, 1943. The local reviewer noted the audience's enthusiasm for a work that was neither original nor brilliant; its familiarity and stock characters seemed to be what they wanted. After two weeks in Boston, the production moved to Philadelphia, where it opened at the Walnut Theatre on December 6, 1943. The reviewer here was more critical of the play: "'Ramshackle Inn' is a rather ramshackle play, with its crazy quilt plot a farrago of odds and ends of wild melodrama and dizzy farce". The author "has hit upon a few amusing wisecracks. But they are not sufficient to make the play.... hang together or give it the sustained excitement and tension necessary".

After two weeks in Philadelphia, producer Reud announced the production would take a week off to rehearse new material provided by Owen Davis. The revised play replaced the original Nazi spies and saboteurs with a black market liquour-cutting racket. It also dropped one featured character, Mr. Cosgrove, and introduced another, Arbothnot. Six members of the cast were replaced with new actors at this time. The producer then took the unusual step of having the revised production do a four-day tryout at Blair Junior High School auditorium in Norfolk, Virginia. This surprisingly large facility held an audience of up to nine hundred when the revised play debuted there on December 27, 1943. Local reviewer Warner Twyford was kind with the actors, but said of the play: "It is not funny enough to be crackerjack comedy, it is not scary enough to be exciting melodrama, it is not mysterious enough to be a mystery".

The production then went to Richmond for two more days of tryouts, having shed and acquired a supporting actor along the way. Once there, lead actress Luella Gear chose to depart, necessitating replacement Ruth Gates to go on with 24 hours notice. Both local reviewers felt the acting and direction were ok, that star ZaSu Pitts provided sufficient drawing power, but the play itself was flawed.

=== Premiere ===
The play had its premiere at the Royale Theatre on January 5, 1944. According to a columnist, there was some talk about Max Gordon scheduling his premiere of Ruth Gordon's Over 21 on the same date Reud had reserved for Ramshackle Inn, but Reud later revealed he was a follower of Evangeline Adams and had chosen the date according to astrological principles. (Note: Both shows opened and closed on the same dates.)

=== Reception ===
Critical reception of the play was unanimous that ZaSu Pitts performed very well in a losing effort, the work itself being fatally flawed. Arthur Pollock of The Brooklyn Eagle said of ZaSu Pitts and the play that it was "no pearl of the comic spirit, but she is a charming buffoon and there are many people who will find the thing funny with her in it". He also credited Pitts with carrying the whole show: "The dialogue has no spring in it whatever. Take away Miss Pitts and there is nothing". Lewis Nichols of The New York Times expressed the hope Miss Pitts might have a better vehicle in her next Broadway appearance. According to Nichols, "'Ramshackle Inn' quite often succeeds in being only sleepy when it means to be hair-raising, and silly when it means to be funny".

John Chapman in the Daily News concurred with other reviewers that Miss Pitts' performance was the main draw, but also mentioned some able support from Joe Downing, Richard Rober, and Harlan Briggs. He called Ramshackle Inn a "tumbledown play" and noted that the audience could only have "a merely mildly exciting time as the plot unfolded like one of Miss Pitts' knee joints". However, there is nothing harder for critics to predict than the popular appeal of a comic farce. By the end of March 1944, Ramshackle Inn had reached its 100th performance, paid off all its production and tryout costs, and was still raking in between twelve and eighteen thousand dollars a week.

=== Closing ===
The original Broadway run closed at the Royale on July 8, 1944, after 216 performances. Columnist Jack O'Brien ascribed the Broadway closing to "torridity".

== National tour ==
As soon as the production closed in New York, it moved to Washington, D.C. for one week at the National Theatre starting July 10, 1944. This was an unusual summer opening at a time when most theaters had no air-conditioning. It then went to Chicago where it opened on July 17, 1944, at the Selwyn Theater.

=== Cast ===
Cast at the start of the national tour after Broadway closing
Role	Actor	Dates	Notes
Patton	Joe Downing	Jul 10, 1944 -	
Joyce Rogers	Margaret Callahan	Jul 10, 1944 -	
Mame Phillips	Cora Witherspoon	Jul 10, 1944 -	
Belinda Pryde	ZaSu Pitts	Jul 10, 1944 -	
Constable Small	Harlan Briggs	Jul 10, 1944 -	
Bill Phillips	Jack Ruth	Jul 10, 1944 - Jul 15, 1944	Ruth was used just for the Washington D.C. performances.
Bill Phillips	Richard Basehart	Jul 17, 1944 -	
Mary Temple	Mary Barthelmess	Jul 10, 1944 -	
Arbothnot	Mason Curry	Jul 10, 1944 -	
Lucius Towser	Ralph Theadore	Jul 10, 1944 -	
Dr. Russell	Lucian Self	Jul 10, 1944 - Jul 15, 1944	
Dr. Russell	Joseph Draper	Jul 17, 1944 -	
Gail Russell	Helene Heigh	Jul 10, 1944 -	
Alice Fisher	Delma Byron	Jul 10, 1944 - Jul 15, 1944	
Alice Fisher	Dorothy Benson	Jul 17, 1944 -	
Mr. Temple	Royal Dana Tracy	Jul 10, 1944 - Jul 15, 1944	Tracy committed to Washington D.C. but no farther on the national tour.
Mr. Temple	Arthur Griffin	Jul 17, 1944 -	
Gilhooley	Robert Toms	Jul 10, 1944 -	
Fred Porter	John Lorenz	Jul 10, 1944 -	

== Adaptions ==
=== Television ===
Ramshackle Inn was adapted to an hour-long teleplay for The Philco Television Playhouse, with ZaSu Pitts, Joe Downing, Ralph Theadore, and Robert Toms reprising their roles. It was broadcast live on January 2, 1949, and featured Nancy Davis as Mary Temple, Vivian Vance as Joyce Rogers, Gordon Peters as Constable Small, with Lewis Charles, Richard Bishop, Michael Lawson, Joseph Sweeny, and Don De Leo. Recorded on kinescope, it was later rebroadcast on local television stations.
