= Helene Heigh =

American actress

- Born: August 6, 1904; Arkansas
- Died: December 20, 1991 (aged 87); Los Angeles, California
- Occupation: Actress

Helene Heigh was an American film, television, and stage actress.

== Selected filmography ==
- Mass Appeal (1984)
- Teenage Thunder as Aunt Martha Simpson (1957)
- Plunder Road as Society Woman (1957)
- Monsieur Verdoux as Yvonne, Marie's friend (1947)
- Her Sister's Secret as Etta (1946)
- Murder Is My Business as Eleanor Renslow Ramsey (1946)
- The Undercover Woman as Laura Vixon (1946)

== Theater ==
- Ramshackle Inn (1944)
