= Anna-Lisa =

Norwegian actress, puppeteer (1933–2018)

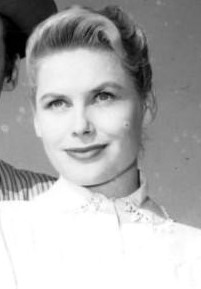
- Anna-Lisa in Black Saddle (1959)
- Born: Anna Lisa Ruud; 30 March 1933; Oslo, Norway
- Died: 21 March 2018 (aged 84); Oslo, Norway
- Occupations: Actress of film, television, and stage, puppeteer
- Years active: 1958–1995

Anna-Lisa (born Anna Lisa Ruud; 30 March 1933 – 21 March 2018) was a Norwegian-born actress and puppeteer who appeared primarily in American films and television series, until she returned to Norway in the early 1970s, where she became a puppeteer.

== Early life ==
Anna-Lisa was born in Oslo, Norway as Anna Lisa Ruud, and worked there at the Central Theater. In 1954, she travelled to the United States to visit her brother, a travel agent in Hollywood.

== Career ==
In the late 1950s, she guest-starred in the Western television series Sugarfoot, Maverick, and Bronco, all of which were aired by ABC/Warner Bros. She guest-starred on the 1960 series, The Islanders, an adventure/drama set in the South Pacific, and on Bonanza (episode: "The Savage") and Gunsmoke (episode: "The Blacksmith"). She won a recurring role as Nora Travers in the ABC Western series Black Saddle, with Peter Breck and Russell Johnson. Her success in Black Saddle resulted in roles in two spaceflight-themed feature films: the 1959 Three Stooges comedy Have Rocket, Will Travel and a year later in 12 to the Moon. She continued to appear in such television series as GE True, hosted by Jack Webb, until she left Hollywood to follow a career on the stage. She appeared in an episode of The Millionaire in 1959; the episode ".45 Caliber" of Laramie; a 1963 segment of Perry Mason, "The Case of the Velvet Claws" as Norma Vickers; and the 1964 episode "The Village of Guilt" of Voyage to the Bottom of the Sea.

In the early 1970s, she moved back to Norway. From 1976 until she retired from stage in 1995, she was a puppeteer at the Oslo Nye theatre in the Norwegian capital.

== Filmography ==
- Have Rocket Will Travel (1959) - Three Stooges sci fi movie
- Sea Hunt - season three, episode 23 (1960)
- Bonanza (1960) - Ruth Halversen / White Buffalo Woman in the episode "The Savage"
- Laramie (11-15-60, TV series 2, episode 8) - Louisa in “.45 Caliber”
- 12 to the Moon (1960) - Dr. Sigrid Bomark
- 77 Sunset Strip (1960-1962, two episodes) - Marie Kosary / Dr. Abby Ryner
- Gunsmoke (1960) - Gretchen Mueller in season six, episode two "The Blacksmith "
- Voyage to the Bottom of the Sea (TV series) - season one (1965) "The Village of Guilt" episode

== Death ==
Anna-Lisa died in Oslo on 21 March 2018, aged 84.
