= High Vacuum =

1957 novel by Charles Eric Maine

- First edition (UK)
- Author: Charles Eric Maine
- Language: English
- Genre: Science fiction novel
- Publisher: Hodder & Stoughton (UK); Ballantine Books (US)
- Publication date: 1957
- Publication place: United Kingdom
- Media type: Print (hardcover)
- Pages: 192 pp

High Vacuum is a science fiction novel by Charles Eric Maine. It was first published in 1957 by Hodder & Stoughton.

== Synopsis ==
The first crewed Moon ship, Alpha, runs out of fuel just before landing in the Mare Imbrium and crashes, killing one of the four-person crew and marooning the rest. The novel follows the castaways as they struggle to survive and return to Earth.

== Critical reception ==
In the June 1958 issue of Science Fiction Stories, Damon Knight wrote,

"Maine's style is stiff and pompous, full of tautologies, but it moves the story along purposefully; his characters are oversimplified but vivid and forceful...The only thing really wrong with the book, in fact, is the science in it. Maine's physics is bad, his chemistry worse...The gross errors in this novel are in the area of common knowledge (as if a Western hero should saddle up a pueblo and ride off down the cojones): any one of them could have been corrected by ten minutes with a dictionary or an encyclopedia."
