= Ted Hammond =

American veterinarian and amusement park consultant

Douglas Dean "Ted" Hammond (1936? – 25 November 2012) was an American veterinarian and amusement park consultant based in Asia.

== Career ==
Before graduating from veterinary school in 1968, Ted Hammond worked with the Navy Marine Mammal Program near Point Mugu. He was a founding and honorary life member of the International Association for Aquatic Animal Medicine. Hammond was credited with research leading to a potential vaccine for melioidosis, caused by Burkholderia pseudomallei, based on his work as the park curator of Ocean Park Hong Kong. He had been recruited by Dr. Ken Norris to work at Ocean Park.

The relationships between the veterinarian, oceanariums, marine life and the general public have always been in flux but never so much as in the last few years. Oceanariums now find it necessary to react to the public awareness which they, themselves, originally fostered. They are no longer merely a facility for recreation. Now, more than ever before, oceanariums are becoming a source of vital scientific information and a positive influence on youth and conservation organizations.

— Dr. Douglas D. Hammond, The Orient: Information — the Key to Our Future

Hammond was instrumental in brokering the sales of live dolphins caught in the Taiji dolphin drive to many places around the world including Turkey, Mexico, and the Dominican Republic.

He was a primary witness in a lawsuit between one of his clients and dolphin activist Ric O'Barry.

== Personal life ==
Hammond grew up in Ventura County, California, and graduated from Oxnard High School. He received his Doctor of Veterinary Medicine from the University of California, Davis in 1968. Hammond died in 2012 following complications from heart valve surgery in Las Vegas, Nevada.

== Bibliography ==
- Hammond, D.; Elsner, R.; Simison, J.; Hubbard, R. (1969). "Submersion bradycardia in the new born elephant seal (Mirounga angustirostris)". American Journal of Physiology. 216 (1): 220–222. doi:10.1152/ajplegacy.1969.216.1.220. PMID 5765585.
- Kooyman, Gerald L.; Hammond, D. D.; Schroeder, J. P. (1970). "Bronchograms and tracheograms of seals under pressure". Science. 169 (3940): 82–84. Bibcode:1970Sci...169...82K. doi:10.1126/science.169.3940.82. PMID 5447537. S2CID 11609130.
- Elsner, R.; Hanafee, W. N.; Hammond, D. D. (1971). "Angiography of the inferior vena cava of the harbor seal during simulated diving". American Journal of Physiology. 220 (5): 1155–7. doi:10.1152/ajplegacy.1971.220.5.1155. PMID 5574630.
- Hammond, D.; Elsner, R. (1977). "Anesthesia for phocid seals". J Zoo Animal Med. 8 (2): 7–13. doi:10.2307/20460142. JSTOR 20460142.
- Liong, Edgard; Hammond, D. D.; Vedros, Neylan A. (1985). "Pseudomonas pseudomallei infection in a dolphin (Tursiops gilli): A case study" (PDF). Aquatic Mammals. 1: 20–22.
- Hammond, D. D.; Leatherwood, S. (1984). "Cetaceans live-captured for Ocean Park, Hong Kong: April 1974—February 1983". Report of the International Whaling Commission: 491–495.
