= Escapement (film) =

1958 British film by Montgomery Tully

- UK theatrical release poster
- Directed by: Montgomery Tully; David Paltenghi (dream sequences)
- Written by: J. MacLaren Ross (additional dialogue)
- Screenplay by: Charles Eric Maine
- Based on: Escapement by Charles Eric Maine
- Produced by: Alec C. Snowden; Jim O'Connolly; Richard Gordon
- Starring: Rod Cameron; Mary Murphy
- Cinematography: Bert Mason; Teddy Catford (dream sequences)
- Edited by: Geoffrey Muller
- Color process: Black and white
- Production company: Amalgamated Productions
- Distributed by: Anglo-Amalgamated Film Distributors
- Release date: 4 March 1958 (United Kingdom)
- Running time: 76 minutes
- Country: United Kingdom
- Language: English

Escapement (also known as The Electronic Monster) is a 1958 British horror science fiction film directed by Montgomery Tully and David Paltenghi (dream sequences). The screenplay was by Charles Eric Maine based on his 1956 novel of the same title.

The film was released in the UK (as Escapement) on March 4, 1958. It was released in the US (retitled The Electronic Monster) on June 10, 1960.

== Plot ==
Inquiring into the mysterious death of a Hollywood star, insurance investigator Jeff Keenan uncovers an exclusive psychiatric clinic on the French Riviera. Here, patients who want to escape the stresses of life are hypnotized, then laid out in morgue-like drawers and left to dream for several weeks. It turns out that Zakon, the clinic's owner, is using a "dream machine" to alter the sleepers' dreams, and to impose his will on theirs.

== Cast ==
- Rod Cameron as Jeff Keenan
- Mary Murphy as Ruth Vance
- Meredith Edwards as Dr. Philip Maxwell
- Peter Illing as Paul Zakon
- Carl Jaffe as Dr. Hoff (as Carl Jaffé)
- Kay Callard as Laura Maxwell
- Carl Duering as Blore
- Roberta Huby as Verna Berteaux
- Felix Felton as Police Commissaire
- Larry Cross as Brad Somers
- Carlo Borelli as Signore Pietro Kallini
- John McCarthy as Claude Denver
- Jacques Cey as police doctor
- Armand Guinle as French farmer (as Armande Guinle)
- Malou Pantera as clinic receptionist
- Pat Clavin as receptionist at studio
- Alan Gifford as Wayne, Insurance Company Chief

== Production ==
Producer Richard Gordon later said there were major problems with the film's special effects. He also said that he had a dispute with Anglo-Amalgamated, who did not want the movie to get an X certificate in England, whereas Gordon wanted more horror for the US. Most of Anglo's films were crime oriented but this had some science fiction aspects.

The film's electronic music soundtrack is credited to Soundrama with John Simmons as consultant and Robert Taylor as music director.

== Release ==
Escapement was released in the United States on June 10, 1960, retitled The Electronic Monster. It played on a double bill with the Japanese film Battle in Outer Space (1959)

== Critical reception ==
The Monthly Film Bulletin wrote: "Though Charles Eric Maine is credited with the script, the credit titles make no mention of his intriguing but surely unfilmable novel. The film, in any case, is a tepid adaptation which scarcely suggests the genuinely terrifying possibilities explored in the book. The "dream sequences" (as they are called) are a mistake; the "electronic music" (as it is called) loses much of its effect through over-use. All the same, the theme gives this science fiction melodrama a certain originality."

Variety wrote: "The Electronic Monster offers one or two novel twists to an old cinema standby, the one about the diabolical scientist-sorcerer who creates disciples by toying with human brains. Since modern audiences seem intrigued with dramati-clinical sorties into the mysteries of the human thought mechanism, the Columbia release generates a certain pseudo-scientific appeal that should qualify it for comfortable second-billing. Outside of this quality and the fact that it has been produced wiih cinematic skill, it's a strictly routine melodrama. ... The dream sequences give the picture a curious dash of sex."

Chibnall and McFarlane in The British 'B' Film wrote that the film: "generates a genuine strangeness of atmosphere through its use of electronic music and special effects."

In British Sound Films: The Studio Years 1928–1959 David Quinlan rated the film as "mediocre", writing: "Main sufferers are the audience who have to sit through this unconvincing tosh."

TV Guide noted, "an intriguing feature in that it was among the first to examine the possibilities of psychological manipulation and brainwashing."
