= Night of the Blood Beast =

1958 American science-fiction horror film by Bernard L. Kowalski

- Theatrical release poster
- Directed by: Bernard L. Kowalski
- Screenplay by: Martin Varno; Jerome Bixby (uncredited); Harold Jacob Smith (uncredited)
- Story by: Martin Varno; Gene Corman
- Produced by: Gene Corman
- Starring: Michael Emmet; Angela Greene; John Baer; Ed Nelson
- Cinematography: John Nickolaus, Jr.
- Edited by: Richard C. Currier; Jodie Copelan
- Music by: Alexander Laszlo
- Production companies: Balboa Productions, Inc.
- Distributed by: American International Pictures
- Release dates: September 8, 1958; (Texas). December 5, 1958 (wider release)
- Running time: 62 minutes
- Country: United States
- Language: English
- Budget: $68,000

Night of the Blood Beast is a 1958 American science fiction horror film about a team of scientists who are stalked by an alien creature, which implants its embryos in an astronaut's body during a space flight. Produced by exploitation filmmaker Roger Corman and his brother Gene, it was one of the first films directed by Bernard L. Kowalski and was written by first-time screenwriter Martin Varno, who was 21 years old. It starred several actors who had regularly worked with Roger Corman, including Michael Emmet, Ed Nelson, Steve Dunlap, Georgianna Carter and Tyler McVey. Blood Beast was distributed on September 8, 1958 by American International Pictures in the Texas area as a double feature with Corman's She Gods of Shark Reef (1958). The same double feature went into wider release on December 5, 1958 in other markets.

It took Varno six weeks to write the script, the original working title of which was Creature from Galaxy 27. The story was partially influenced by the real-life Space Race and the Howard Hawks film The Thing from Another World (1951). Screenwriters Jerome Bixby and Harold Jacob Smith gave Varno uncredited assistance with the dialogue. With a budget of about $68,000, it was shot over seven days at the Charlie Chaplin Studios, Bronson Canyon and a television station on Mount Lee in Hollywood.

The Blood Beast alien costume was also previously used in the Roger Corman film Teenage Caveman (1958), which was filmed just two weeks earlier. Art director Daniel Haller, who built the rocket ship and other props, slept at the sound stage between work sessions. Following dissatisfaction with his treatment by the Cormans, Varno pursued two successful arbitration cases, one of which was for underpayment. The other was in response to Gene Corman's original story writing credit, even though Varno claimed to have written the entire story himself.

The film was featured in a 1996 episode of the comedy television series Mystery Science Theater 3000.

== Plot ==
A rocket ship carrying astronaut John Corcoran launches and orbits the Earth, marking the United States' first crewed space launch. Shortly after taking off, the ship is struck by an unknown object, forcing Corcoran to abort the mission and land. However, the equipment cannot handle the fast descent back into the atmosphere and the ship crash lands in the woods, killing Corcoran. Dave Randall and Donna Bixby, two technicians from a nearby space agency tracking station, locate the crashed ship and recover Corcoran's body. They are baffled, however, by what appears to be a giant tear in the side of the destroyed spacecraft and a mud-like substance covering some of the wreckage. Randall and Bixby are joined by lead scientist Dr. Alex Wyman, technician Steve Dunlap and physician Julie Benson, who was also Corcoran's fiancé. Wyman observes that Corcoran's body exhibits no signs of rigor mortis and that the blood pooling beside him is not livid as it should be. The team brings the corpse back to their lab to run tests and find further irregularities. Although the body lacks a heartbeat or pulse, it maintains the blood pressure of a living human being. After looking at his blood in a microscope, they find unusual, unidentifiable cells that seem resistant to destruction from human white blood cells.

The team tries to call for further assistance, but find the radio is no longer working. Randall heads outside to check the power transformers, and is attacked by a large creature hiding in the underbrush around the station. Randall fires a few shots at the creature with his pistol and escapes unscathed. Although he did not get a good look at the creature, he describes it to the rest of the team as similar in size to a bear. Later, the team finds the infirmary has been trashed and Corcoran's body is gone. They initially believe the creature has broken in and stolen the corpse, but are shocked to instead find Corcoran has mysteriously regained consciousness. Upon checking his blood again, there is no trace of the mysterious cells from before, but after investigating Corcoran's body, they find the cells have changed into lizard-like fetuses and entered into his abdominal cavity. The creature later breaks into the lab again, this time killing Dr. Wyman and taking part of his head. Randall and Dunlap are initially suspicious that Corcoran was involved in the death, which he denies, but it appears he has some sort of telepathic connection with the creature. Despite Wyman's death, Corcoran does not believe the creature is evil, but rather simply misunderstood. He implores the others to give the creature a chance to explain its actions and asks that they not condemn it as a monster simply because it is different.

As the others plot to destroy the creature with improvised gas bombs and flares, Corcoran flees the station and finds the creature in a nearby cave. After consuming Wyman's brain, the creature is now able to speak with the scientist's voice and has absorbed his knowledge using “photosynthesis”. Corcoran asks whether Wyman's death was needed, but the creature insists it was a necessary sacrifice. The others arrive to destroy the creature, but hesitate because Corcoran will not step aside and let them throw their bombs. The creature insists it is not an evil monster, but an intelligent alien who has come to Earth to save the human race from its own self-destructive tendencies. It explains that Corcoran's body has been implanted with its embryos, which will allow the alien species to multiply and take over the human race, which the creature claims is the only way to truly save humanity. Upon realizing the creature is forcing the will of its species on the human race, Corcoran concludes the creature is evil after all and commits suicide so its embryos cannot come to fruition. The others then throw their explosives and kill the creature, which in its dying breath warns that others from his species are waiting in space and will return one day to conquer humanity.

== Cast ==
- John Baer as Steve Dunlap
- Angela Greene as Dr. Julie Benson
- Ed Nelson as Dave Randall
- Georgianna Carter as Donna Bixby
- Michael Emmet as Major John Corcoran
- Tyler McVey as Dr. Alex Wyman
- Ross Sturlin as The Creature

== Production ==
=== Writing ===
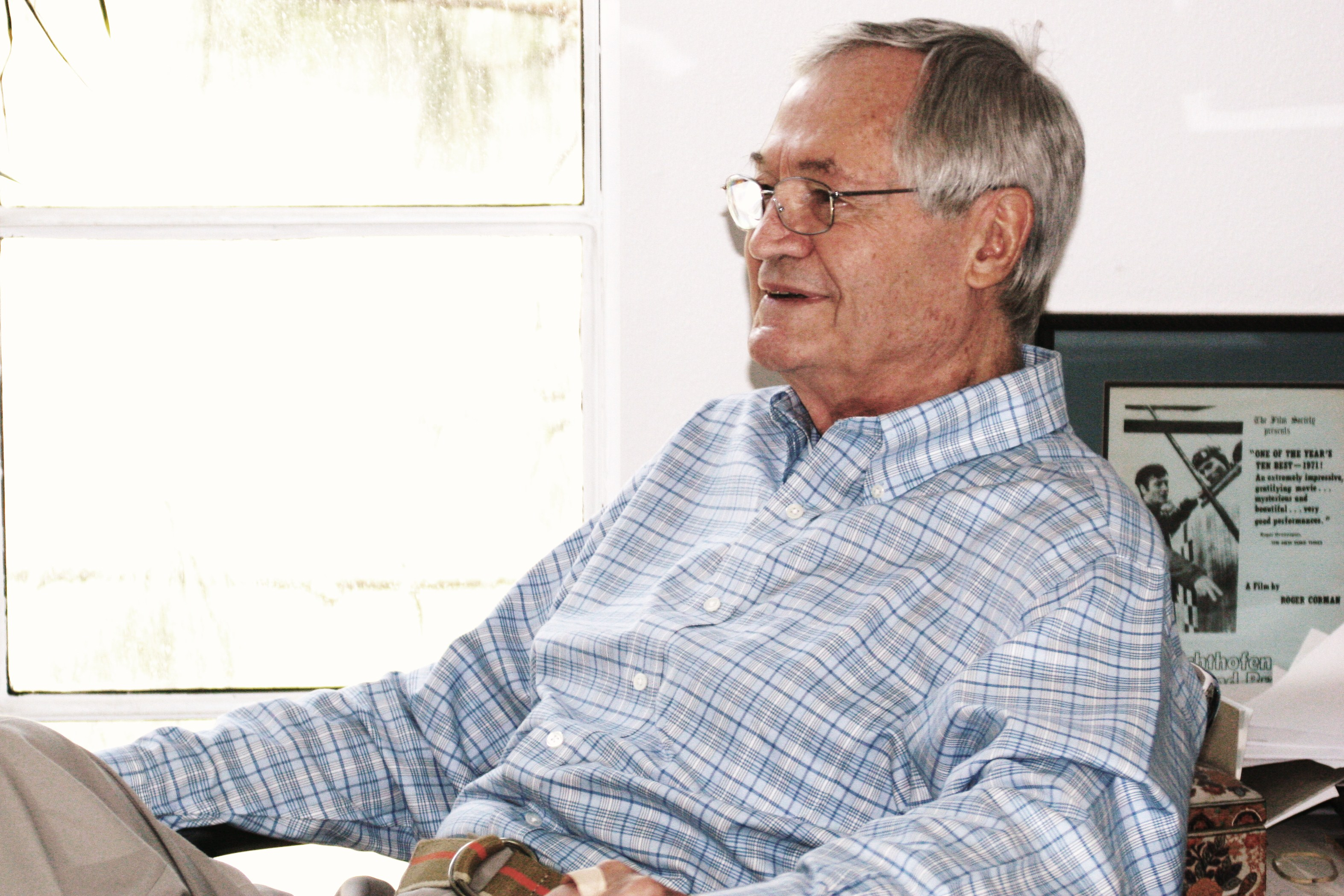
Roger Corman was an executive producer on Night of the Blood Beast

Night of the Blood Beast was one of several films produced by B movie filmmaker Roger Corman and his brother, Gene Corman. The two also partnered together in making Hot Car Girl (1958), Beast from Haunted Cave (1959), Attack of the Giant Leeches (1959) and The Premature Burial (1962).

Jerome Bixby, the science fiction screenwriter who wrote It! The Terror from Beyond Space (1958), was originally approached for the job, but Bixby was working on another project and recommended his close friend Martin Varno for the job. Varno, the son of veteran actor Roland Varno, was 21 years old at the time. He met with Roger and Gene Corman, who discussed with him what Varno called "some sort of a weird idea for the picture". They offered Varno a couple hundred dollars for the job, which was below the minimum compensation rates known as "scale", but Varno was not part of the Writers Guild of America at the time and did not know about the guidelines. He accepted the offer and signed a contract. Although Varno had a rough idea it would be a low-budget film, he said the Cormans set no specific guidelines for him: "I gave them the impression that I knew pretty much what I was doing, and they sort of got the idea that I wasn't going to use 50,000 extras and things."

It took about six weeks to write the Blood Beast script. It was written under the working title Creature from Galaxy 27, which was conceived by Varno, but the Corman brothers later changed it to Night of the Blood Beast. Gene Corman received film credit for conceiving the film's story, but Varno claimed he wrote the film almost entirely himself and that Corman had little to do with the story: "He had some rambling ideas but they didn't have very much to do with the movie that became Night of the Blood Beast." Varno also said of him: "Gene didn't open his mouth, really, until Roger told him he could." Varno said he wrote the screenplay alone and showed parts of it to Roger and Gene Corman as he went along. Varno researched medical and aerospace technology at a library in Hollywood near Vine Street. The story, which fictionally portrays America's crewed voyage into space, was heavily influenced by the real life Space Race ongoing between the United States and Soviet Union at the time. Gene Corman said another major inspiration was The Thing from Another World (1951), a Howard Hawks-directed science fiction film about a group of soldiers and scientists threatened by an alien creature in a remote Arctic research outpost. He said of the film, "How could you not be [influenced]? We had to be, if only indirectly or subconsciously. That was a classic film then, a classic film today." However, Varno said any influence from The Thing was only subconscious: "I loved some of the scenes in The Thing and I'm sure that crept in one way or another, but not overtly."

Varno said he received uncredited assistance from his friends and fellow screenwriters Jerome Bixby and Harold Jacob Smith, the latter of whom won an Academy Award for Best Original Screenplay for the film The Defiant Ones (1958). Varno ran lines and ideas by both men and sought advice. Smith in particular inspired lines for the speech made by the monster at the end of the film, in which the creature discusses how the human characters consider him the embodiment of evil simply because he is different from them. Varno said much of that dialogue from Smith, however, ended up getting cut from the final film. One of the primary themes of the film, as embodied in John Corcoran's attempts to defend the alien creature, was that simply because someone or something is ugly or different does not necessarily make it evil. However, the script also followed a common trait of most horror films of the 1950s that even somewhat understandable monsters are not entirely sympathetic and the Blood Beast creature proves itself evil by impregnating Corcoran against his will and pursuing world domination.

=== Casting ===
The Cormans cast the film together with director Bernard L. Kowalski, who was 28 years old at the time. Kowalski also directed Roger Corman's Hot Car Girl. Night of the Blood Beast was one of Kowalski's first directorial credits and his first science fiction film, although he later went on to direct Attack of the Giant Leeches. For the Blood Beast cast, they mostly selected actors that had worked on other Roger Corman films. Michael Emmet had worked with Kowalski on the Western television series Boots and Saddles, where Kowalski directed most of the episodes Emmet had a major role in and was impressed with the actor's work ethic. Emmet later starred in the Roger Corman film Attack of the Giant Leeches. Ed Nelson also worked on several Roger Corman films, including Swamp Women (1955), Attack of the Crab Monsters (1957), Teenage Doll (1957) and She Gods of Shark Reef (1958). When asked what Nelson remembered about the film during a 2003 interview, he admitted, "Not much", but he said Roger and Gene Corman were very knowledgeable about film and treated the material "light-heartedly".

=== Filming ===
These kinds of shows are made as a collaborative effort. Everyone did everything, which is a wonderful way to work. I mean, everyone's totally involved, everyone cares. Though they were seven-day shows and the titles were exploitative, we wanted them to be the very best we could possibly make them.

— Bernard L. Kowalski

The film was shot over seven days with a budget of about $68,000. Both Roger and Gene Corman were present for most of the film's production and involved creatively as well as financially. Gene was more involved with running the day-to-day operations while the more experienced Roger Corman supervised and provided guidance to both Gene and Kowalski. Martin Varno was also present for shooting. They operated out of the Charlie Chaplin Studios, which was called Kling Studios at the time. Some rewriting was done as the filming progressed, and director Bernard L. Kowalski called it a collaborative process that involved himself, the Cormans and the whole crew. Varno, however, said he was not happy with how the filming process went and that the Cormans changed dialogue and story elements without his consultation or permission. He said it reached the point where he called his agent and said, "I am not working for these sons of bitches any more! I am sick and tired of the whole thing!"

All of the interior scenes were shot at sound stages inside Kling Studios. Most of the exterior shots were filmed at Bronson Canyon, a set of caves at Griffith Park in Los Angeles that was a popular shooting location for low-budget films. The exterior scenes of the tracking station were shot at a television station on Mount Lee, not far from the Hollywood Sign. Varno said it was the first television station built in Los Angeles, but was only being used for emergency broadcasts when Night of the Blood Beast was filmed; it had also been used during World War II to send information and propaganda to the Allied Forces' overseas allies. Varno secured permission to film there simply by calling the city of Los Angeles and asking permission, something he said nobody else considered trying because they assumed the city would not allow it. Varno was familiar with the station because his father, Roland Varno, appeared in the first dramatic television show released in Los Angeles and it was transmitted from that station. For the Night of the Blood Beast shoot, Los Angeles charged a fee of $8 per actor to shoot at the station, but the crew could be any size. All shooting took place outside the station and none inside. Most of the station night scenes there were shot during the day, and the film crew often had to find shadows to shoot in or block out the sun to give the impression of nighttime. Gene Corman said of the shooting: "That was one of the more mobile units I've ever been involved with. Normally, everybody chases the sun; we were chasing the shadows."

The alien costume featured in Night of the Blood Beast was the same as the one used in another Roger Corman film, Teenage Caveman (1958). This was done to save money, as the Cormans often tried to incorporate existing sets, costumes and other elements from previous films into new ones for financial savings. Varno said the Corman brothers were so conscious of their spending that "'cheap' was the main word in their vocabulary". The monster costume scenes in Teenage Caveman and Night of the Blood Beast were shot within about two weeks of each other. The costume was modified slightly for Blood Beast; Varno claimed somebody on the set said "the nose looks too Jewish", so it was cut down slightly to more resemble a beak. Ross Sturlin wore the costume for the scenes in both Teenage Caveman and Night of the Blood Beast. Filming was very difficult for Sturlin because it grew extremely hot inside the costume during the exterior shots. John Mathew Nickolaus, Jr. was director of photography for the film and Jack Bohrer was the production manager. Daniel Haller, who went on to become a film director himself, worked as art director on Night of the Blood Beast. Haller did much of the manual construction work on the set himself, and brought a trailer in to the sound stage so he could sleep there and between work sessions. Among the props he built was the rocket ship, the frame of which was made of plywood that had been cut into circles, then covered with a plastic sheet and spray-painted to look metallic. Haller also created blood cells that the characters looked at under a microscope and the baby aliens (which resembled seahorses) they looked at under a fluoroscope. Alexander Laszlo composed the music for the film. Almost the entire crew went on to work on Attack of the Giant Leeches with the Corman brothers and Kowalski. Laszlo’s score for Night of the Blood Beast was reused for Leeches, and was then reused again for the Corman brothers’ 1959 film Beast from Haunted Cave, which was directed by Monte Hellman. The full story of the making of "Blood Beast" is told on Tom Weaver's audio commentary track for Film Masters' 2024 Blu-ray; the commentary includes recreations of Weaver's interviews with the movie's writer Martin Varno, producer Gene Corman and director Bernard L. Kowalski.

== WGA arbitration ==
I'm one of the few people who ever arbitrated against Roger Corman. Because so many people were so, "My God! I'm working! I'm working in a real movie! Roger's giving me a chance!" And, meanwhile, Roger's paying this guy hardly anything a week. ...Well, hey, that's better than nothing – this was the thinking of most people.

— Martin Varno

Martin Varno's dissatisfaction with the Cormans eventually led him to take them into formal arbitration proceedings. Although Varno was not a member of the Writers Guild of America when he wrote the Blood Beast script, he was encouraged by actor Jay Jostyn to discuss the matter with them. According to Varno, Jostyn claimed several actors and writers had similar problems with the Cormans in the past, but were not taking action because the Cormans provided them continued work in their films. After meeting with the Writers Guild, Varno became a member and filed arbitration papers against the Cormans for not paying him enough. Roger Corman was in the process of editing the film when he received the arbitration notice, and he became so angry he started screaming and throwing things in the cutting room. Varno claims one of the film crew members approached him (Varno) and promised that the Cormans would hire Varno to work on many of their future films if he dropped the matter, but Varno refused.

Varno later filed a second arbitration upon learning that Gene Corman was to receive writing credit for the original story. Varno claimed Corman had nothing to do with the story and produced large amounts of dated notes he claimed proved he wrote it himself. Varno won both arbitration matters. However, Roger Corman refused to pay Varno and, as a result, he was not allowed to use Writers Guild of America members on his films. Corman used non-union writers for several years, but he finally agreed to pay Varno when he wanted to use a union writer on one of his films. Varno said he would have sought more money for the delay, but he was out of the country when Corman paid the money and missed his opportunity. Additionally, despite Varno winning arbitration in the writing credit matter, Gene Corman was given on-screen original story credit in Night of the Blood Beast. When contacted by the distributor, American International Pictures, Varno was told removing Corman's credit would mean recalling all of the prints and changing them, which would have cost thousands of dollars, and Varno agreed to allow it to remain unchanged.

== Release ==
=== Distribution ===
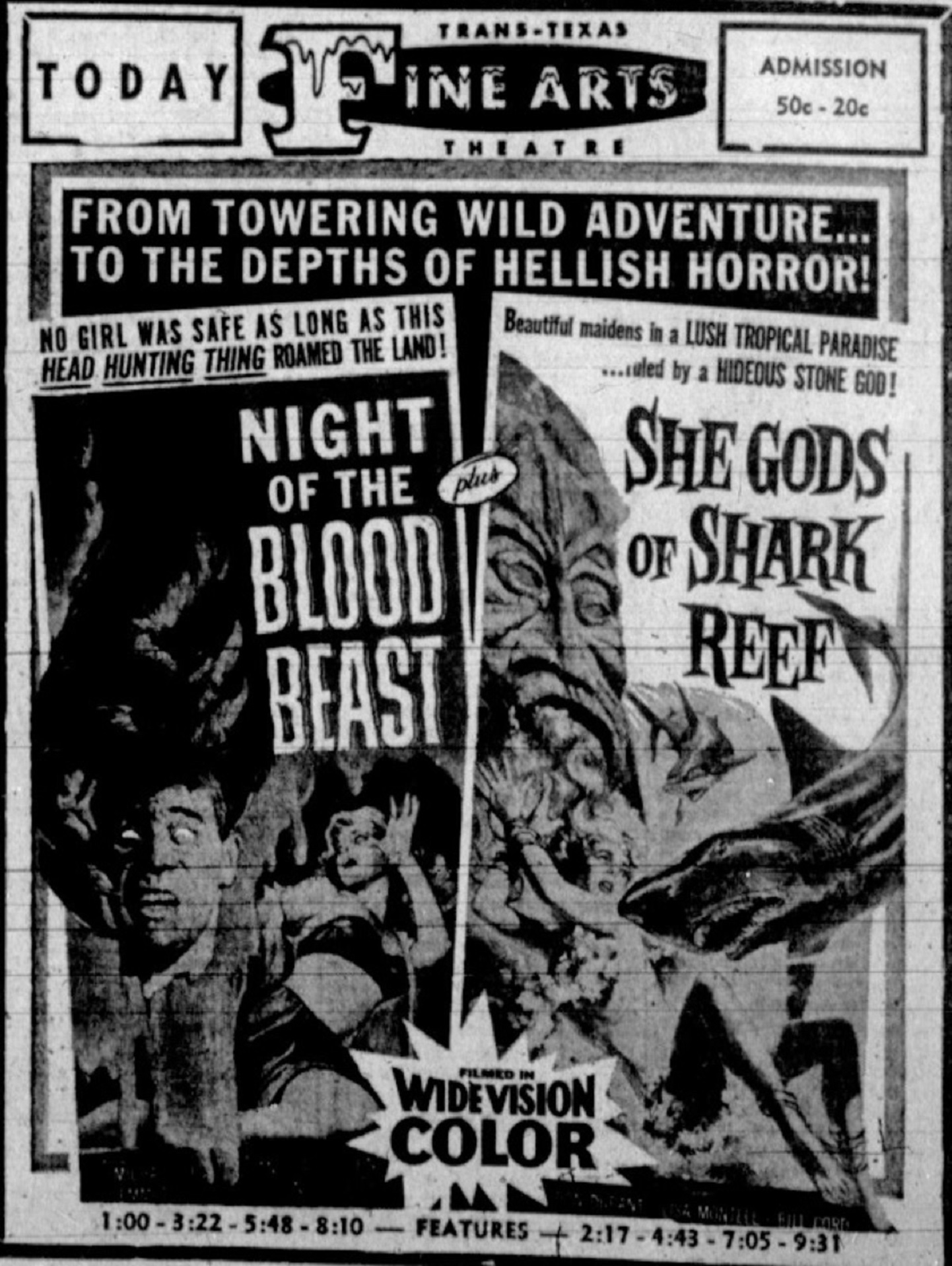
Advertisement from 1958 for Night of the Blood Beast and co-feature, She Gods of Shark Reef.

Night of the Blood Beast was distributed by American International Pictures. It was test-screened for audiences in unadvertised sneak previews, in which audiences attending a different film were surprised with a screening of Night of the Blood Beast instead. Coincidentally, Martin Varno attended one of these sneak previews without any advance knowledge of what it was. The screening was also attended by Roger and Gene Corman, who were not pleased by Varno's presence. It was the first time the screenwriter had seen the completed film, which he did not enjoy, and he said of watching it: "On my left side was sitting Forry Ackerman, and on my right side was sitting Jerry Bixby. And their main job was to keep my hands held down so I wouldn't cut my throat."

Blood Beast was released on September 8, 1958 by American International Pictures in the Texas area as a double feature with Corman's She Gods of Shark Reef (1958). The same double feature went into wider release on December 5, 1958 in other markets.

== Reception ==
Variety called it "a respectfully suspensful picture."

John L. Flynn, a Towson University English professor who has written extensively about science-fiction film, unfavorably compared Night of the Blood Beast to The Creeping Terror (1964), which was also about an astronaut returning from space with a stowaway alien creature. Although Flynn said it lacked the "epic pretentiousness" of that film, he nevertheless said of Night of the Blood Beast: "Corman made a career out of making cheap knock-offs of popular films, but he seems to be scraping the bottom of the barrel here". The Washington Post writer Tom Shales said "it would be hard to find a worse movie" and that the monster "looks like the San Diego Chicken after having been tarred and feathered". Film critic and historian Steven H. Scheuer said the plot was a good idea but criticized what he called a "sloppy execution". Literary and film critic John Kenneth Muir said he considered the film a failure because the monster "simply could not live up to expectations once revealed". Leonard Maltin's Movie Guide gave the film one-and-a-half out of four stars with the entry: "Well directed, but too low budget to succeed." Night of the Blood Beast was among several films universally considered terrible that film reviewer Michael Adams watched as part of a book about his quest to find the worst film of all time. However, Adams said he enjoyed it on a B movie level, calling it "cheap but enjoyable and buoyed by its ideas". John Stanley, who hosted the San Francisco television show Creature Features about science fiction films, said Night of the Blood Beast deliberately imitated the best scenes from The Thing from Another World. Chris Eggerston of Bloody Disgusting wrote that the alien in the film "looks like a human-sized parrot covered in feces" and ranked it as the fifth worst movie monster of all time. However, he said that the film's idea of an alien impregnating a human being was an "interesting concept," noting that it was reused in Ridley Scott's Alien.

== Mystery Science Theater 3000 ==
Night of the Blood Beast was featured in the seventh season premiere episode of Mystery Science Theater 3000, along with Once Upon a Honeymoon (1956), a short film by Bell Telephone about a married couple forced to postpone their honeymoon even further so that the husband can write a song for a demanding diva. Night of the Blood Beast was one of several Roger Corman-produced or -directed films that were featured on the show, along with It Conquered the World (1956), The Viking Women and the Sea Serpent (1957), Teenage Caveman (1958) and Attack of the Giant Leeches (1959). Night of the Blood Beast was originally broadcast on November 23, 1995, as a Thanksgiving special; the non-movie segments revolved around Thanksgiving in Deep 13, the headquarters of the mad scientist who ran MST3K's bad movie experiment. The episode was later broadcast with all new non-movie segments; the original version ran only four times, none after the non-Thanksgiving version debuted February 3, 1996, with Pearl Forrester taking over as a mad due to Frank's departure from the show.

The show's episode guide, The Mystery Science Theater 3000 Amazing Colossal Episode Guide, calls the movie "a science fiction monster thriller with no thrills attached, featuring possibly the stupidest collection of scientists ever to peer into a microscope." Recurring gags during the movie segments include referring to the parasites implanted in Corcoran by the alien as shrimp and mocking the feebleness of the government's response to a rocket crash, sending only a handful of scientists and a flatbed truck to investigate. The movie features "gray men talking flatly in a gray office," head writer / performer Mike Nelson wrote. "The twist is that they all appear to be named Steve. There are some women there too, but their roles are kept to a minimum to avoid sparking any unnecessary interest or character interaction. Gray men talking is mission number one."

The episode fared moderately well with fans, placing #75 of 177 in a poll of MST3K Season 11 Kickstarter backers. Writer Jim Vogel, however, counted Night of the Blood Beast as the fifth-best episode of MST3K. "The film is just a dull speck of nothing," Vorel wrote, "and yet, the Best Brains make it something magical. ...There's no end to the amazing running gags that are established throughout." Vorel also is baffled by the short, unable to understand how an angel helping newlyweds compose for a musical was supposed to convince viewers to buy phones.

The MST3K version of the film was released on July 20, 2010, by Shout! Factory as part of the Mystery Science Theater Collection Vol. XVI DVD set along with The Corpse Vanishes (episode #105), Warrior of the Lost World (episode #501), and Santa Claus (episode #521).

== Bibliography ==
- Adams, Michael (2010). Showgirls, Teen Wolves, and Astro Zombies: A Film Critic's Year-Long Quest to Find the Worst Movie Ever Made. It Books. ISBN 978-0-06-180629-2.
- Beaulieu, Trace; et al., eds. (1996). The Mystery Science Theater 3000 Amazing Colossal Episode Guide. New York City, New York: Bantam Books. ISBN 0-553-37783-3.
- Flynn, John L. (2005). War of the Worlds: From Wells to Spielberg. Galactic Books. ISBN 0-9769400-0-0.
- Maltin, Leonard, ed. (2004). Leonard Maltin's 2005 Movie Guide. New York City, New York: Plume. ISBN 0-452-28592-5.
- McGee, Mark (1996). Faster and Furiouser: The Revised and Fattened Fable of American International Pictures. Jefferson, North Carolina: McFarland & Company. ISBN 978-0-7864-0137-6.
- Miller, Cynthia J. (2011). ""Remember: Only you can prevent Roger Corman": The King of the Bs Under Siege". In Weiner, Robert G.; Barba, Shelley E. (eds.). In the Peanut Gallery with Mystery Science Theater 3000: Essays on Film, Fandom, Technology and the Culture of Riffing. Jefferson, North Carolina: McFarland & Company. ISBN 978-0-7864-4532-5.
- Muir, John Kenneth (2007). Horror Films of the 1970s. Jefferson, North Carolina: McFarland & Company. ISBN 978-0-7864-3104-5.
- Sanders, Clinton R. (1999). Loukides, Paul; Fuller, Linda K. (eds.). Beyond the Stars 2: Plot Conventions in American Popular Film. Popular Press 1. ISBN 0-87972-517-6.
- Scheuer, Steven H., ed. (1990). Movies on TV and Videocassette 1991–1992. New York City, New York: Bantam Books. ISBN 0-553-28801-6.
- Stanley, John (1988). Revenge of the Creature Features Movie Guide: An A to Z Encyclopedia to the Cinema of the Fantastic, or, Is There a Mad Doctor in the House? (3 ed.). Creatures at Large. ISBN 0-940064-04-9.
- Warren, Bill (1986). Keep Watching The Skies! American Science Fiction Movies of the 1950s. Vol. 2. New York: McFarland & Company. ISBN 0-89950-170-2.
- Weaver, Tom (1999). Return of the B Science Fiction and Horror Movie Makers: Writers, Producers, Directors, Actors, Moguls and Makeup. Jefferson, North Carolina: McFarland & Company. ISBN 0-7864-0755-7.
- Weaver, Tom (2007). Eye on Science Fiction: 20 Interviews with Classic SF and Horror Filmmakers. Jefferson, North Carolina: McFarland & Company. ISBN 978-0-7864-3028-4.
- Weaver, Tom (2003). Double Feature Creature Attack: A Monster Merger of Two More Volumes of Classic Interviews. Jefferson, North Carolina: McFarland & Company. ISBN 0-7864-1366-2.
- Young, R.G. (2000). The Encyclopedia of Fantastic Film: Ali Baba to Zombies. Milwaukee, Wisconsin: Applause Books. ISBN 1-55783-269-2.
