= The Everglades (TV series) =

Television series

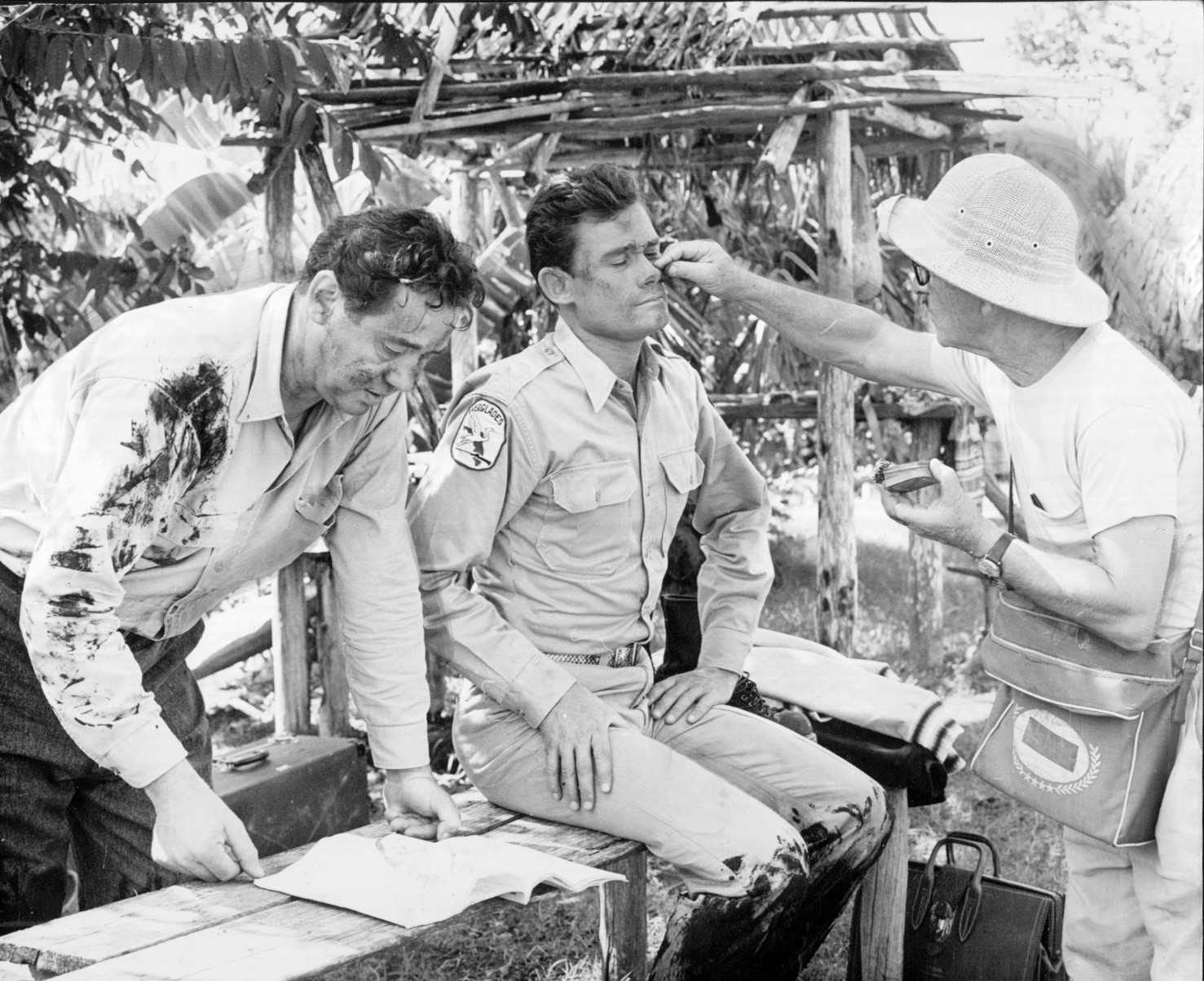
- Ron Hayes (Lincoln Vail) being made up for a scene
- Genre: Adventure fiction, Crime drama
- Created by: Albert Wilmore
- Written by: Stuart Jerome; Richard Donovan; Stephen Kandel
- Directed by: Jack Herzberg (19 episodes); John Floria (14); Franklin Adreon (4)
- Starring: Ron Hayes; Gordon Casell
- Theme music composer: Warren Barker; Jerry Keller
- Opening theme: "The Everglades"
- Country of origin: United States
- Original language: English
- No. of seasons: 1
- No. of episodes: 38

Production
- Executive producer: Ivan Tors
- Producers: Budd Schulberg; Johnny Florea
- Camera setup: multi-camera
- Running time: 30 minutes
- Production company: Ziv-United Artists

Original release
- Network: Syndication
- Release: October 9, 1961 – June 26, 1962

The Everglades is an American crime-adventure television series that aired in syndication for one season from 1961–62 and in reruns. Ron Hayes starred as Constable Lincoln Vail, a law enforcement officer of the fictional Everglades County Patrol who traveled the Florida Everglades in an airboat, a vehicle which was often the focus of the program. Hayes, a northern California actor and stuntman, was an avid outdoorsman and conservationist.

Gordon Casell appeared in five of the 38 half-hour episodes as Chief Anderson, Vail's superior. Steve Brodie made three appearances as Captain Andy Benson; Dan Chandler was twice cast as Vail's sidekick, airboat guide Pete Hammond. Future film star Burt Reynolds appeared twice in the role of Lew Johnson and once as Trask.

Guest stars included R.G. Armstrong, Victor Buono, Roger C. Carmel, Paul Carr, Jack Cassidy, Lonny Chapman, Jack DeLeon, John Doucette, Ken Drake, Penny Edwards, Don Eitner, Frank Ferguson, Luke Halpin, Carol Henry, Anthony Jochim, Robert Karnes, Douglas Kennedy, Robert Knapp, Paul Lambert, Tyler McVey, Larry Pennell, Robert Phillips, Mala Powers, Stephen Roberts, Chris Robinson, Johnny Seven, Ray Teal, Bill Travers and Dawn Wells.

== Background ==
The original script for the series, "Son of the Everglades", was written by model and actor Albert Wilmore of Ft. Lauderdale, Florida, who spent his free time sailing and fishing in Whitewater Bay, before the Everglades became a national park. Wilmore was fascinated by the myriad birds, wildlife and mangrove estuaries in the shallow waters, and the native Seminoles. His son Scott recalled that Wilmore decided to meld a wildlands backdrop and use native Seminoles, with a park ranger, and high-speed airboats. Wilmore pitched the story to a number of production companies in Miami and Hollywood, Florida.

After Wilmore's wife Edith died, Scott discovered a deed for an acre of land within Everglades National Park. Scott explained that the deed was a gift from the Seminoles, acknowledging Albert's efforts for their inclusion in the production. Originally, the director wanted to use white actors in reddish makeup instead.

Scott Wilmore later sold the land, under threat of eminent domain, to the National Park Service for $300.

== Episodes ==
No.	Title	Directed by	Written by	Original release date
1	"The Escape"	Jack Herzberg	Frank Granville	October 9, 1961
2	"Heat in Town"	John Florea	Richard L. Adams	October 16, 1961
3	"Greed of the Glades"	Jack Herzberg	George Callahan	October 23, 1961
4	"Primer for Pioneers"	Andrew V. McLaglen	Budd Schulberg	October 30, 1961
5	"Angry Town"	Jack Herzberg	Stuart Jerome	November 6, 1961
6	"The Photographer"	Jack Herzberg	Vernon E. Clark	November 13, 1961
7	"Clay Island Murder"	John Florea	Stephen Kandel	November 20, 1961
8	"Lie Detector"	John Florea	Arthur Weiss	November 27, 1961
9	"Flight at Boca Chico"	Jack Herzberg	Teddi Sherman	December 4, 1961
Vail is forced to judge a deadly duel between the heads of two feuding families.
10	"The Experts"	John Florea	Richard Donovan & William Woodfield	December 11, 1961
11	"Good Boy"	John Florea	Stanley H. Silverman	December 18, 1961
12	"The Long Walk"	Jack Herzberg	Stuart Jerome	December 26, 1961
13	"The Brand"	Jack Herzberg	E. M. Parsons	January 1, 1962
14	"Young Osceola"	Jack Herzberg	Stanley H. Silverman	January 8, 1962
15	"Force Ten"	John Florea	Stephen Kandel	January 15, 1962
16	"The Running Target"	John Florea	Stephen Kandel	January 22, 1962
17	"The Hostage"	John Florea	Stephen Kandel	January 29, 1962
18	"Black Honeymoon"	Jack Herzberg	George Fass & Gertrude Fass	February 5, 1962
19	"Edge of Panic"	Jack Herzberg	Frank Grenville	February 12, 1962
20	"Emergency Treatment"	Jack Herzberg	George Callahan	February 19, 1962
21	"Final Hours"	Franklin Adreon	Vernon E. Clark	February 26, 1962
22	"River of No Return"	Jack Herzberg	Charles B. Smith	March 5, 1962
23	"Friday's Children"	Franklin Adreon	Story by : Roland Martone; Teleplay by : William Woodfield	March 12, 1962
24	"Rowboat Teacher"	Jack Herzberg	Frank Granville	March 19, 1962
25	"Curtains for Kocomo"	Franklin Adreon	E. M. Parsons	March 26, 1962
26	"Fatal Information"	John Florea	Story by : Lou Huston & Richard Donovan; Teleplay by : Lou Huston	April 3, 1962
27	"Killer in Calico"	Jack Herzberg	Stuart Jerome	April 10, 1962
28	"Keene's Choice"	Jack Herzberg	Teddi Sherman	April 17, 1962
29	"The Perfect Crime"	John Florea	Stanley H. Silverman	April 24, 1962
30	"Unwanted: Dead or Alive"	John Florea	Richard L. Adams	May 1, 1962
31	"The Stranger"	Franklin Adreon	Austin Richards & John Wilson	May 8, 1962
32	"Hideout"	Jack Herzberg	Stuart Jerome	May 15, 1962
33	"Price of Evil"	John Florea	E. M. Parsons	May 22, 1962
34	"A Day's Occupation"	Jack Herzberg	Stuart Jerome	May 29, 1962
35	"The Rookie"	John Florea	Richard Donovan	June 5, 1962
36	"The Four Day Weekend"	John Florea	Richard Donovan	June 12, 1962
37	"Appointment with Death"	Jack Herzberg	Story by : Robert Warnes Leach; Teleplay by : Teddi Sherman	June 19, 1962
38	"The Expedition"	Jack Herzberg	Kathleen Blatz	June 26, 1962

== Production ==
South Florida shooting locations included Everglades National Park, Andytown, Coopertown, Frog City, Sweetwater and Forty Mile Bend along the Tamiami Trail.

The original plan was to use white actors as Seminoles with makeup and studio-produced costumes, but native Seminoles, wearing their traditional dress, were used. They were pleased to have the comparatively easy work as both extras and, because of their expertise and mechanical abilities, to operate and maintain the airboats. They had little prior employment opportunities living within the Everglades, other than beading, giving airboat rides and wrestling with alligators for the tourist trade. Few were given speaking parts and nearly all of them were denied entry into the Screen Actors Guild (SAG), the actors union.

Because the show was on a tight budget (an episode was completed every two-and-a-half days), Chandler was given little training on airboats, so there were a few unintentional "flybys" and at least one crash, leaving the actor swinging from an overhanging tree. Hays, however, became an accomplished air boat driver and formed close bonds with the Seminoles who supplied and maintained them.

During 1961, Tors was filming the first of his two Flipper feature films in Miami and the Florida Keys; Dan Chandler was signed for a recurring role in his Flipper TV series, and for a part in the 1964 movie sequel, Flipper's New Adventure.
