= Gene Corman =

American film producer and agent (1927–2020)

- Born: Eugene Harold Corman; September 24, 1927; Detroit, Michigan, U.S.
- Died: September 28, 2020 (aged 93); Beverly Hills, California, U.S.
- Occupations: Producer; agent
- Spouse: Nan Corman
- Children: 2
- Relatives: Roger Corman (brother)

Eugene Harold "Gene" Corman (September 24, 1927 – September 28, 2020) was an American film producer and agent. He was the younger brother of Roger Corman with whom he collaborated on several occasions.

== Biography ==
Corman moved with his family from Detroit to California in 1940, where he attended Beverly Hills High School and Stanford University. He graduated in 1948 and went to work in the mailroom at MCA, entering the film industry before his brother. Corman became an agent and vice president of MCA, representing such clients as Joan Crawford, Fred MacMurray, Richard Conte, Harry Belafonte, and Ray Milland. Corman also represented his brother negotiating the distribution deal for the latter's first film Monster from the Ocean Floor. He died at his Beverly Hills Home on September 28, 2020, four days after his 93rd birthday.

=== Producer ===
Corman moved into producing in the late 1950s, making a number of movies with Bernard L. Kowalski and Robert L. Lippert as well as with his brother, Roger. Corman brother films rarely took longer than two months to make; they formed Filmgroup Productions in 1959. He was known to test film titles out by informally surveying Hollywood high school students.

During the 1960s he produced several films that his brother directed, including Night of the Blood Beast, Beast from Haunted Cave, Attack of the Giant Leeches, Tower of London, The Premature Burial, The Secret Invasion, Target Harry and Von Richthofen and Brown.

In 1970, he and Roger co-founded "the hugely successful independent company New World Pictures" according to The Hollywood Reporter. During the early 1970s, Corman also had his own producing unit at MGM. He later became vice-president of 20th Century Fox Television.

According to Filmink "One of the side effects of Roger Corman’s fame was the relegation of his producer brother Gene, to the shadows of film history. This was both unfair and unfortunate since Gene not only played a crucial, often overlooked part in his brother’s story, he had a fine career of his own."

In 1982, he won the Outstanding Drama Special Emmy for A Woman Called Golda.

Corman continued to work as a VP at Fox Television until retiring in 1990.

== Filmography ==
- I Mobster (1958)
- Hot Car Girl (1958)
- Night of the Blood Beast (1958)
- Beast from Haunted Cave (1959)
- Attack of the Giant Leeches (1959)
- Valley of the Redwoods (1960)
- The Secret of the Purple Reef (1960)
- The Intruder (1962)
- The Tower of London (1962)
- The Secret Invasion (1964)
- The Girls on the Beach (1965)
- Ski Party (1965)
- Beach Ball (1965)
- Tobruk (1967)
- You Can't Win 'Em All (1970)
- Von Richthofen and Brown (1971)
- Cool Breeze (1972)
- Private Parts (1972)
- Hit Man (1972)
- The Slams (1973)
- I Escaped from Devil's Island (1973)
- Darktown Strutters (1975)
- Vigilante Force (1976)
- F.I.S.T. (1978)
- The Big Red One (1980)
- A Woman Called Golda (1982) (TV movie)
- Vital Parts (2001)
