= Gunmen from Laredo =

1959 film directed by Wallace MacDonald

- Theatrical poster for the film
- Directed by: Wallace MacDonald
- Written by: Clark E. Reynolds
- Produced by: Wallace MacDonald
- Starring: Robert Knapp; Jana Davi; Walter Coy
- Cinematography: Irving Lippman
- Edited by: Al Clark
- Production company: Columbia Pictures
- Distributed by: Columbia Pictures
- Release date: March 1959 (US)
- Running time: 67 minutes
- Country: United States
- Language: English

Gunmen from Laredo is a 1959 American Western film produced and directed by Wallace MacDonald, which stars Robert Knapp, Jana Davi and Walter Coy.

== Cast ==
- Robert Knapp as Gil Reardon
- Jana Davi as Rosita
- Walter Coy as Ben Keefer
- Paul Birch as Matt Crawford
- Don C. Harvey as Dave Marlow
- Clarence Straight as Frank Bass
- Jerry Barclay as Jordan Keefer
- Ron Hayes as Walt Keefer
- Charles Horvath as Coloradas
- Jean Moorhead as Katy Reardon
- X Brands as Delgados
- Harry Antrim as Judge Raymond Parker
- John Cason as Bob Sutton
- Hank Patterson as Stableman
- Dan White as Jury foreman
- Joseph Breen as Walker
- Bill Hale as Dodge
- Gil Perkins as Bowdrie
- Larry Thor as Capt. Garrick
- Don Blackman as Smoky
- Martin Garralaga as Fierro
