= Robert Knapp (actor) =

American actor

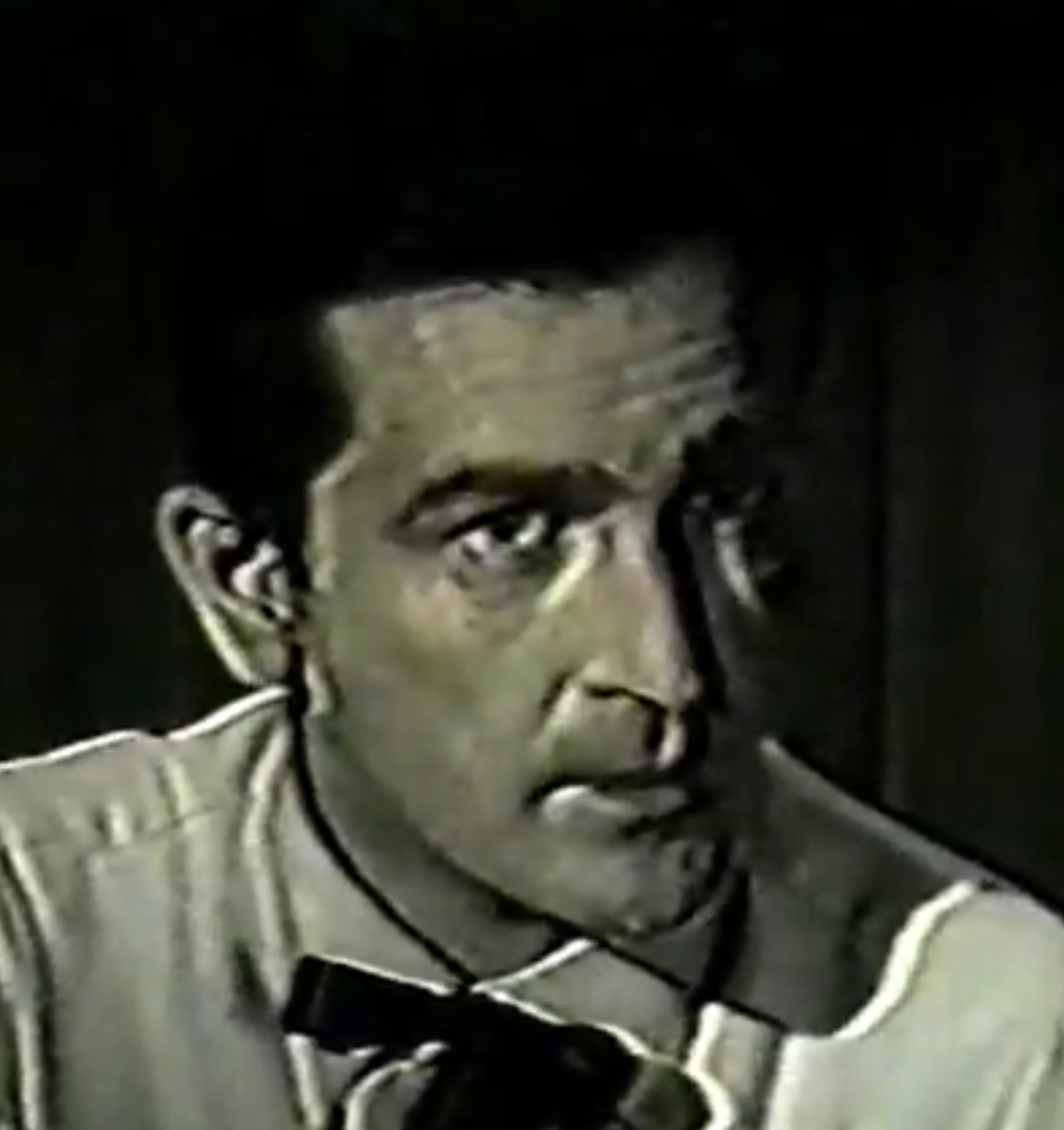
- Knapp in an episode of Lock-Up (1961)
- Born: February 24, 1924; Los Angeles, California, U.S.
- Died: May 17, 2001 (aged 77); Glendale, California, U.S.
- Occupation: Actor
- Spouse: Marilyn Remillard

Robert Knapp (February 24, 1924, Los Angeles, California – May 17, 2001, Glendale, California) was an American actor who appeared in film and on television between 1951 and 1976.

== Background ==
As a teenager, Knapp worked on his father's orange grove in Covina, Los Angeles County, where he attended school. As a youth he particularly excelled in swimming and football. He studied for a year in a college in Glendale but dropped out to work as a messenger for Warner Brothers Studios. He became a member of Irving Asher's unit. After two years in the United States Army making training films, he returned to Warner Brothers, where he was employed in the publicity department and then as a second assistant director.

His acting career was launched after he was seen playing opposite Mary Boland and Charles Ruggles in the play One Fine Day.

Knapp's father was president of the Aurbaugh Department Store in Lansing, Michigan; brother Roland Knapp worked there for a time as a buyer. Knapp and his wife, the former Marilyn Remillard, lived in the San Fernando Valley early in his career. They were both active sculptors. He built his own badminton court in his backyard.

== Films ==
Knapp's first film role, uncredited, was in 1951 in Rogue River with Rory Calhoun and Peter Graves. He subsequently appeared in Mesa of Lost Women (1953), as pilot Grant Phillips, Scandal Incorporated. (1956), as tabloid reporter Jess Blanchar, Revolt at Fort Laramie (1957), as Lt. Chick Waller, and The Rawhide Trail (1958), as Farley Durand.

In 1959, Knapp was cast in the lead as Gil Reardon in the film Gunmen from Laredo. His other film roles included Hot Car Girl (1958), as Detective Lieutenant Ryan, The Threat (1960), as Steve Keenan, and The Stoolie (1972), as "Big Daddy". He appeared in numerous other films without credit.

== Television ==
In 1955, Knapp appeared as the controversial outlaw, gunfighter, and marshal Jim Courtright on the syndicated anthology series Stories of the Century, starring and narrated by Jim Davis. Knapp was cast as Tom Dixon, a former outlaw trying to change his life and marry his sweetheart in the 1960 episode, "The Devil's Due", on the syndicated anthology series, Death Valley Days, hosted by Stanley Andrews.

Knapp's longest-running television roles were between 1965 and 1971 in eleven episodes of ABC's The F.B.I., starring Efrem Zimbalist, Jr. Knapp played different roles on the crime drama, including five times as agent Noel McDonald. His last appearance in the series was in the role of Lee Amboy in "Superstition Rock" on November 28, 1971.

Knapp appeared three times each on The Roy Rogers Show and Laramie. In the latter NBC western series starring John Smith and Robert Fuller, he was cast as Brodie in "Night of the Quiet Men" (December 22, 1959), as Snow in "The Passing of Kuba Smith" (January 3, 1961), and as Gibbs in "The Last Battleground" (April 16, 1963).

In 1959, he starred in the lead "The Frank Butler Story" of the CBS fantasy drama, The Millionaire. Also that year he played the role of Stuart Baxter in the Perry Mason episode, "The Case of the Caretaker's Cat". He made two other appearances in different roles in 1963: Charles Lambert in "The Case of the Bluffing Blast", and James Bradisson in "The Case of the Drowsy Mosquito". On December 2, 1960, he guest starred in NBC's Michael Shayne as Arthur Hudson in the episode "Blood on Biscayne Bay". That same week he played Joe Tydell in "The Cavedivers" of the CBS sea drama The Aquanauts. Several months earlier, he had played Andy Watson in the episode "Underwater Narcotics" of a similar series, the syndicated Sea Hunt starring Lloyd Bridges.

Between November 10 and December 13, 1965, he was cast nine times as Ben Olson on the long-running NBC soap opera, Days of Our Lives, then in its first season. Between 1962 and 1971, he appeared seven times on CBS's western series, Gunsmoke, his last role as a deputy in "Mirage" on January 11, 1971. Between 1953 and 1955, he appeared five times on NBC's original Dragnet television series starring Jack Webb. He appeared on four other occasions in 1967 in the revamped version of the same series, including the premiere episode, "The LSD Story", in which Knapp portrays a lenient father who wants his son, played by Michael Burns, released for having used the then experimental drug LSD.

Twice Knapp appeared on the following: Public Defender, Navy Log, The Silent Service, Hawaiian Eye, Bonanza, The Rat Patrol, Run for Your Life, M Squad, Boots and Saddles, Lock-Up, The Invaders, and Cheyenne. In the latter ABC western series starring Clint Walker, the first network western to be one hour in length, he played Frank Thorne in "Massacre at Gunsight Pass" (May 1, 1961), and Deputy Rankin in "Wanted for the Murder of Cheyenne Bodie" (December 10, 1962).

Knapp appeared on such westerns as The Rifleman, Broken Arrow, The Adventures of Rin-Tin-Tin, Frontier Doctor, Black Saddle, Casey Jones, and The Gray Ghost. He appeared in such adventure, mystery, and drama series as Schlitz Playhouse, Border Patrol, Surfside 6, 77 Sunset Strip, The Man and the Challenge, Behind Closed Doors, GE True, Coronado 9, Arrest and Trial, Marcus Welby, M.D., Adam-12, Highway Patrol, The DuPont Show with June Allyson, and the Kraft Suspense Theatre. His appearance on the syndicated adventure series, The Everglades, reunited him with series star Ron Hayes, with whom he had been cast in the film Gunmen from Laredo.

Knapp's last role was in 1975 in the Eddie Albert/Robert Wagner CBS drama Switch, in which he played Lieutenant Stone in the unusually titled episode "Gaffing the Skim".

== Filmography ==
Year	Title	Role	Notes
1951	FBI Girl	Lockwood	Uncredited
1951	Fixed Bayonets!	Chuck	Uncredited
1952	Just This Once	Elevator Operator	Uncredited
1952	Without Warning!	Young Policeman	Uncredited
1952	Strange Fascination	Jack	
1953	I Love Melvin	Henneman Aide	Uncredited
1953	Mesa of Lost Women	Grant Phillips	
1954	Silent Raiders	Lt. Finch	
1955	The Long Gray Line	Lieutenant	Uncredited
1956	Revolt at Fort Laramie	Lt. Chick Waller	
1956	Jubal	Jake Slavin	Uncredited
1956	Screaming Eagles	Co-Pilot	Uncredited
1956	Scandal Incorporated	Jess Blanchard - Tabloid Reporter	
1957	Tomahawk Trail	Pvt. Barrow	
1957	Outlaw's Son	Deputy Marshal Raph Striker	
1958	Hot Car Girl	Det. Lt. Ryan	
1959	Gunmen from Laredo	Gil Reardon	
1959	Frontier Doctor	Dr. Ernest Garrison	Episode: "Strange Cargo"
1970	Airport	Jack Dunlap - Passenger	Uncredited
1972	The Stoolie	Big Daddy at Pool	
