= Hot Car Girl =

1958 film

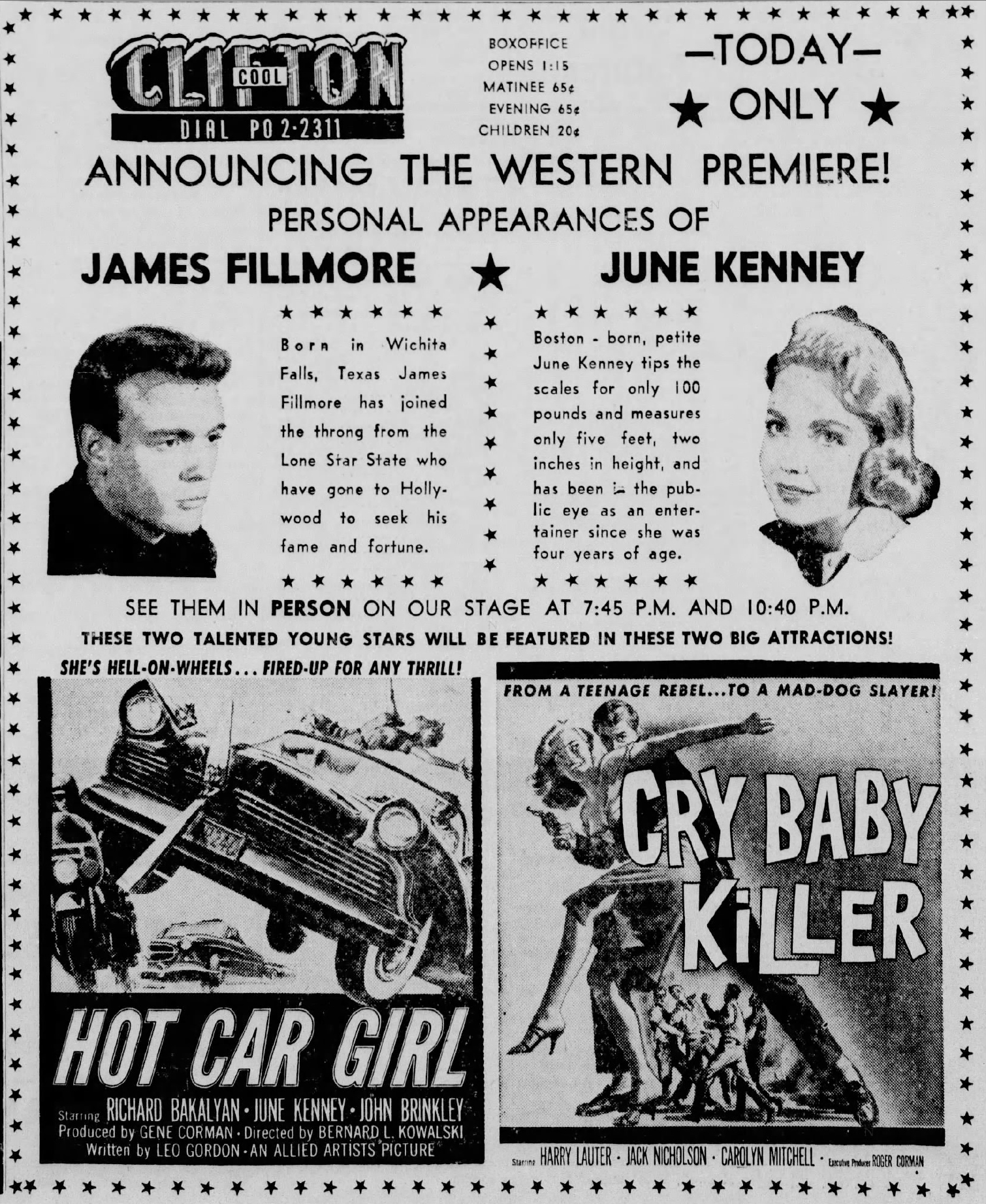
- Double bill poster with The Cry Baby Killer
- Directed by: Bernard L. Kowalski
- Written by: Leo Gordon
- Produced by: Gene Corman
- Starring: Richard Bakalyan; June Kenney; John Brinkley
- Cinematography: John M. Nickolaus Jr.
- Edited by: Irene Morra
- Distributed by: Allied Artists Pictures
- Release date: August 17, 1958
- Running time: 71 minutes
- Country: United States
- Language: English

Hot Car Girl is a 1958 American film directed by Bernard L. Kowalski.

It was an early credit for producer Gene Corman, who said "It had a very modest budget... but it served us well." Gene Corman went on to make two more films with Kowalski.

== Plot ==
Duke and Freddie are two friends who steal car parts and pawn them for support. Duke's girlfriend Peg attempts to dissuade him from this lifestyle. Angered, he taunts her with another girl, Janice, who has driven up alongside him. They line up for a drag race. A motorcycle policeman who chases them is killed as he crashes into Janice's car. Janice gets arrested. Duke, who has driven off, paints his black car light blue to escape detection. Janice learns his license number, and, in fear of being discovered, Duke kills her. Duke coerces Peg to leave town with him. They go on the run as thieves. Realizing his luck will not hold out but unwilling to surrender, Duke sends Peg back. Duke remains alone in an abandoned roadside market, awaiting his fate.

== Cast ==
- Richard Bakalyan as Walter 'Duke' Willis
- June Kenney as Margaret 'Peg' Dale
- Robert Knapp as Det. Lt. Ryan
- John Brinkley as Freddy
- Sheila McKay as Micki
- Bruno Vesota as Joe Doobie
- Jana Lund as Janice Wheeler
- Grace Albertson as Mrs. Dale
- Hal Smith as Lon - Soda Bar Owner
- Tyler McVey as Mr. James Wheeler
- Howard Culver as Dan - Police Headquarters Sergeant
- Jack Lambert as Cop # 1 at Soda Bar
- Ed Nelson as Second Cop at Soda Bar - Driver
