= Boots and Saddles (TV series) =

American television series

- Genre: Western
- Created by: Robert A. Cinader
- Written by: Don Brinkley; Robert A. Cinader; John Hawkins; Gene Roddenberry
- Directed by: William J. Hole, Jr.; Bernard L. Kowalski
- Starring: John M. Pickard; Dave Willock; Michael Hinn; John Alderson; Patrick McVey; Gardner McKay; Michael Emmet
- Theme music composer: Fred Steiner
- Composer: Fred Steiner
- Country of origin: United States
- Original language: English
- No. of seasons: 1
- No. of episodes: 39

Production
- Producers: George Cahan; Robert Stillman
- Editor: Irving Berlin (Note: Not to be confused with the musical composer Irving Berlin)
- Camera setup: Single-camera
- Running time: 22–24 minutes
- Production company: California National Productions

Original release
- Network: Syndication
- Release: September 19, 1957 – May 29, 1958

Boots and Saddles is an American Western television series that aired in syndication from 1957 to 1959.

== Synopsis ==
Set in 1870, the series depicts activities of the U.S. Fifth Cavalry, with the title taken from the bugle call that alerted cavalrymen to their horses. The setting is Fort Lowell, near Tucson, Arizona.

The cast includes John Pickard (billed as Jack Pickard) as Captain Shank Adams, Patrick McVey as Lieutenant Colonel Hayes, Gardner McKay as Lieutenant Kelly, David Willock as Lieutenant Binning, John Alderson as Sergeant Bullock, and Mike Hinn as scout Luke Cummings. Johnny Western has a continuing role on the series. as do Joel Ashley (as Trooper Boone), James Dobson (as Pvt. Hatfield), and Boyd "Red" Morgan.

== Production ==
The series was shot in Kanab Canyon in Utah. The series was produced by California National Productions and sold by NBC Film Division.

Robert Cinader created the show, which was produced by California Studios with George Cahan was executive producer. Anthony Ellis was the writer.

== Critical response ==
A review of the first episode of Boots and Saddles in the trade publication Billboard said that the program's action "ought to make the kids happy", while "[a]t the same time, it's done intelligently, with a sense of reality that should snare the adults."

== Episode list ==
| No. | Title | Directed by | Written by | Original release date |
|---|---|---|---|---|
| 0 | "Cavalry Patrol (Pilot)" | Charles Marquis Warren | John Champion, story by Charles Marquis Warren | TBA |
Dewey Martin as Lt. Johnny Reardon.
| 1 | "The Gatling Gun (aka The Captain's Leave)" | William J. Hole Jr. | Gene Roddenberry | September 19, 1957 |
| 2 | "The Repeater Rifle" | James Neilson | Robert A. Cinader & Antony Ellis | September 26, 1957 |
| 3 | "The Obsession" | James Neilson | Tony Barrett | October 3, 1957 |
| 4 | "Private War" | Unknown | Robert A. Cinader | October 10, 1957 |
The fort is split between lingering Confederate and Union Army sympathizers.
| 5 | "The Prussian Farmer" | Unknown | Gene Roddenberry | October 17, 1957 |
| 6 | "The Paymaster" | Wiliam J. Hole Jr. | Robert A. Cinader & Kathleen Hite | October 24, 1957 |
| 7 | "Terror at Fort Lowell" | Bernard L. Kowalski | Don Brinkley & Robert A. Cinader | October 31, 1957 |
| 8 | "Border Raiders" | Unknown | Robert A. Cinader | November 7, 1957 |
| 9 | "The Deserter" | Unknown | Robert A. Cinader | November 14, 1957 |
Trooper Grimes, a troublemaker who Capt. Adams never had any use for, is caught deliberately giving an Apache prisoner bad water. The incident confirms Adams' decision to get rid of Grimes, but Grimes doesn't see it that way.
| 10 | "Quiet Day at Fort Lowell" | Bernard L. Kowalski | Robert A. Cinader & Tony Barrett | November 21, 1957 |
| 11 | "The Gift" | Unknown | Robert A. Cinader | December 5, 1957 |
| 12 | "The Treasure" | Unknown | Robert A. Cinader | December 12, 1957 |
An American Civil War bandit wills his contraband to the U.S. government, but his daughter, Laurie (Rebecca Welles), comes forward to contest her father's will.
| 13 | "The Coward" | Unknown | Tony Barrett | December 19, 1957 |
A young soldier is accused of running away while under fire by Apaches.
| 14 | "The Marquis of Donnybrook" | Unknown | Gene Roddenberry | December 26, 1957 |
Merriwether (DeForest Kelley) is a champion prizefighter from the 7th Cavalry.
| 15 | "Pound of Flesh" | Unknown | Robert A. Cinader | January 2, 1958 |
| 16 | "The Strange Death of Trooper Jones" | Unknown | Robert A. Cinader & John Hawkins | January 9, 1958 |
| 17 | "The Duel" | Unknown | Robert A. Cinader | January 16, 1958 |
Lieutenant Kelly is challenged to a duel, lance vs. saber, by an Apache chief.
| 18 | "The Last Word" | Unknown | Robert A. Cinader | January 23, 1958 |
| 19 | "The Proud Condemned" | Unknown | Robert A. Cinader & John Hawkins | January 30, 1958 |
| 20 | "Female of the Species (aka The Trooper's Wife)" | Unknown | Robert A. Cinader | February 6, 1958 |
| 21 | "The Dispatch Rider" | Unknown | Robert A. Cinader & John Hawkins | February 13, 1958 |
| 22 | "The Eight-for-Five Men" | Unknown | Robert A. Cinader & John Hawkins | February 20, 1958 |
| 23 | "Late Arrival" | Unknown | Robert A. Cinader | February 27, 1958 |
| 24 | "Rescue of the Strangers" | Bernard L. Kowalski | Gene Roddenberry | March 6, 1958 |
| 25 | "The Cook" | Unknown | Robert A. Cinader | March 13, 1958 |
| 26 | "The Court Martial" | Unknown | Robert A. Cinader | March 20, 1958 |
| 27 | "The Lost Patrol" | Unknown | Robert A. Cinader | March 27, 1958 |
| 28 | "A Question of Duty" | Unknown | Robert A. Cinader | April 3, 1958 |
| 29 | "One-Man War" | Unknown | Robert A. Cinader | April 10, 1958 |
| 30 | "The Indian Scout" | Unknown | Robert A. Cinader | April 17, 1958 |
Robert Knapp plays Private Hank Swanson.
| 31 | "The Politician" | Unknown | Robert A. Cinader | April 24, 1958 |
| 32 | "The Recruit" | Unknown | Tony Barrett, story by Barrett and S. S. Schwartzer | May 1, 1958 |
| 33 | "The Superstition" | William J. Hole Jr. | Don Brinkley & Robert A. Cinader | May 8, 1958 |
| 34 | "Iron John" | Unknown | Robert A. Cinader | May 15, 1958 |
| 35 | "The Holdout" | Unknown | Robert A. Cinader | May 22, 1958 |
| 36 | "Weight of Command" | William A. Hole Jr. | Robert A. Cinader & David Lang | May 27, 1958 |
Diphtheria strikes Fort Lowell.

== Adaptations ==
Ray Bailey adapted the TV series into a comic strip.
