= She Gods of Shark Reef =

1958 film by Roger Corman

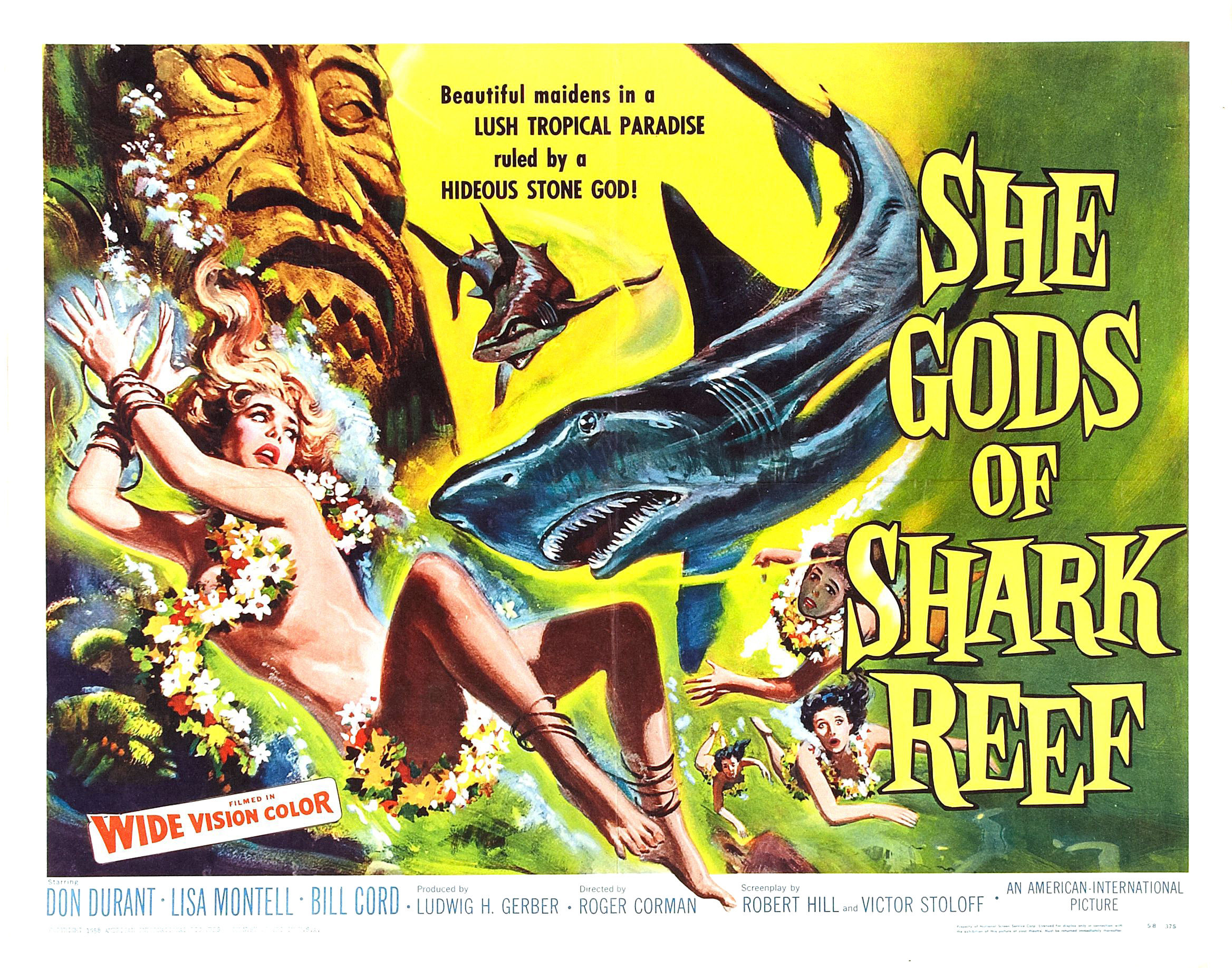
- Theatrical release poster by Reynold Brown
- Directed by: Roger Corman
- Screenplay by: Robert Hill; Victor Stoloff
- Produced by: Ludwig H. Gerber
- Starring: Bill Cord; Don Durant; Lisa Montell; Jeanne Gerson
- Cinematography: Floyd Crosby
- Edited by: Frank Sullivan
- Music by: Ronald Stein
- Production company: Ludwig H. Gerber Productions
- Distributed by: American International Pictures
- Release date: September 8, 1958 (United States)
- Running time: 63 minutes
- Country: United States
- Language: English
- Budget: $50,000 (estimated)

She Gods of Shark Reef is a 1958 B-adventure film directed by Roger Corman that was partially filmed on location in Kauaʻi back to back with Naked Paradise in 1956. She Gods was distributed on September 8, 1958 by American International Pictures in the Texas area as a double feature with Corman's Night of the Blood Beast (1958). The same double feature went into wider release on December 5, 1958 in other markets.

== Plot ==
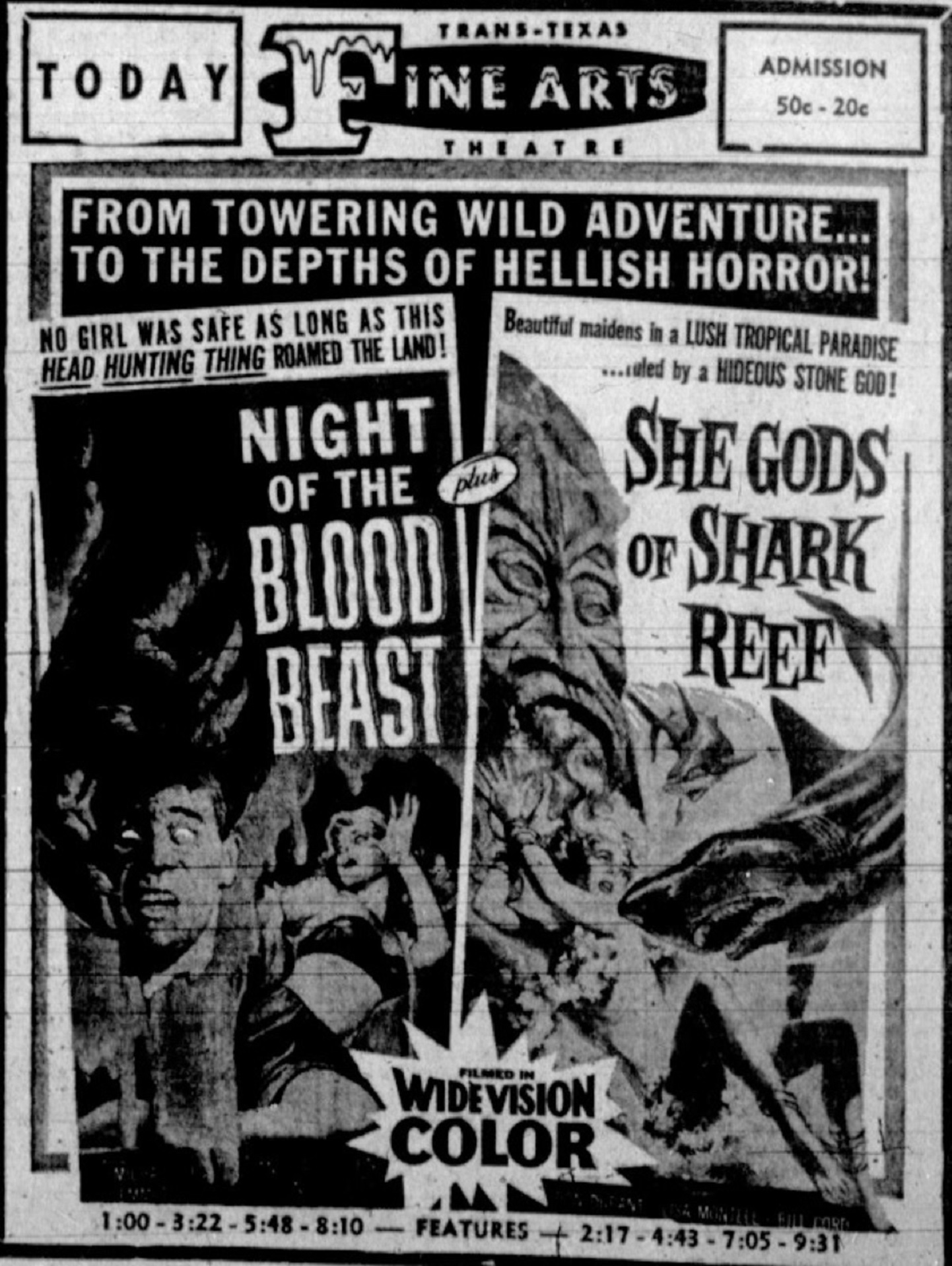
Advertisement from 1958 for She Gods of Shark Reef and co-feature, Night of the Blood Beast.

While stealing weapons as part of his gun running operation, young and reckless criminal Jim (Don Durant) kills two men. Wanted by the authorities, he escapes on the boat of his brother, Chris (Bill Cord). As they sail to the Sulu Sea, where Jim has friends, they are caught in a terrible storm and are shipwrecked in shark-infested waters off a tropical island. They are rescued by pearl divers, who live on the island in a secretive, all-female village. Though the lonely and beautiful women of the island are friendly and flirtatious with the two brothers (the only survivors), the village elder Queen Pua (Jeanne Gearson) is cautious and hostile, wanting the two off the island as soon as possible. Chris falls in love with one of the island beauties, Mahia (Lisa Montell), while Jim, being a wanted man, seeks to escape before the naval ship sent to rescue them arrives. Terrified of being recognized and executed for his crimes, Jim fixes one of the islanders' broken boats and lets his brother and his forbidden love in on his plan. But before they can leave, Jim is overcome by greed and steals the islanders' precious pearls, injuring a native in the process. Chris discovers what his brother has done and tries to stop him, but is overpowered. Jim tries to get away in the boat, pursued by the islanders. Panicking, Jim falls into the sea, where he becomes entangled in the boat's ropes. Chris attempts to rescue Jim, but leaves to help Mahia after she follows him and is forced to fight off a shark. Unable to disentangle himself, Jim is attacked and killed by the shark. Despite the pleas of Queen Pua from the pursuing boats, Mahia escapes with Chris to "leave this evil behind".

== Cast ==
- Bill Cord as Chris, alias Christy Johnston
- Don Durant as Jim, alias Lee Johnston
- Lisa Montell as Mahia
- Jeanne Gerson as Queen Pua
- Carol Lindsay as One of the Hula Dancers
- Ed Nelson as Guard
- Beverly Rivera as Island Girl

== Production ==
The film was announced in July 1956 with singer Don Durant to make his acting debut.

The film was originally entitled Shark Reef, with the "She Gods" part added at the insistence of American International Pictures, who picked it up for distribution. It was shot in two weeks back to back with Naked Paradise, with Corman only taking one day off in between. Corman says the experience was his most enjoyable one making movies to date.

The film was shot at the Coco Palms Resort with the thatched huts of the hotel grounds being used as the native village. Corman only had one shark to photograph, but obtained stock footage of other sharks

Corman left for Hawaii to make it in August 1956.

The film was made for an independent producer, Ludwig H. Gerber, who hoped the film would be picked up and released by a major studio. This did not happen. The film was, instead, sold to AIP in 1958, who released it.

== Reception ==
The Monthly Film Bulletin called it "a poor script, indifferently performed." The Los Angeles Times said it only had two things to recommend it: "it is in color and it is only 63 minutes long." Film critic Lisa Marie Bowman wrote that the film has a "somewhat haphazard story", that its "low budget is obvious in every frame," and "[t]his is one of those films where the action stops for nearly five minutes so that [director] Corman can film a hula dancer."

== See also ==
- List of films in the public domain in the United States
