= Andytown, Florida =

Ghost town in Broward County

Coordinates: 26°08′45″N 80°26′30″W

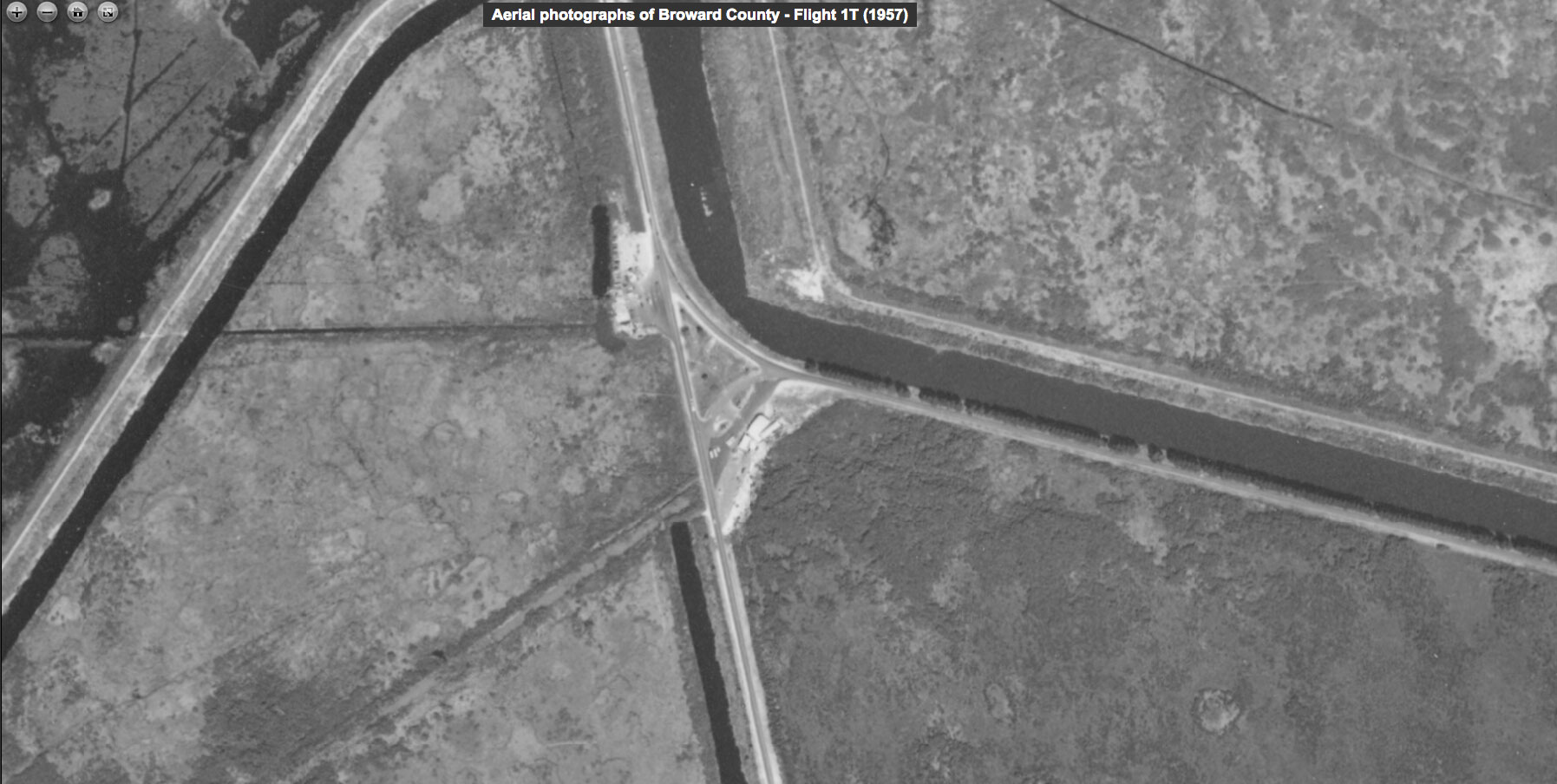
Aerial photograph of Andytown, Fla. in 1957

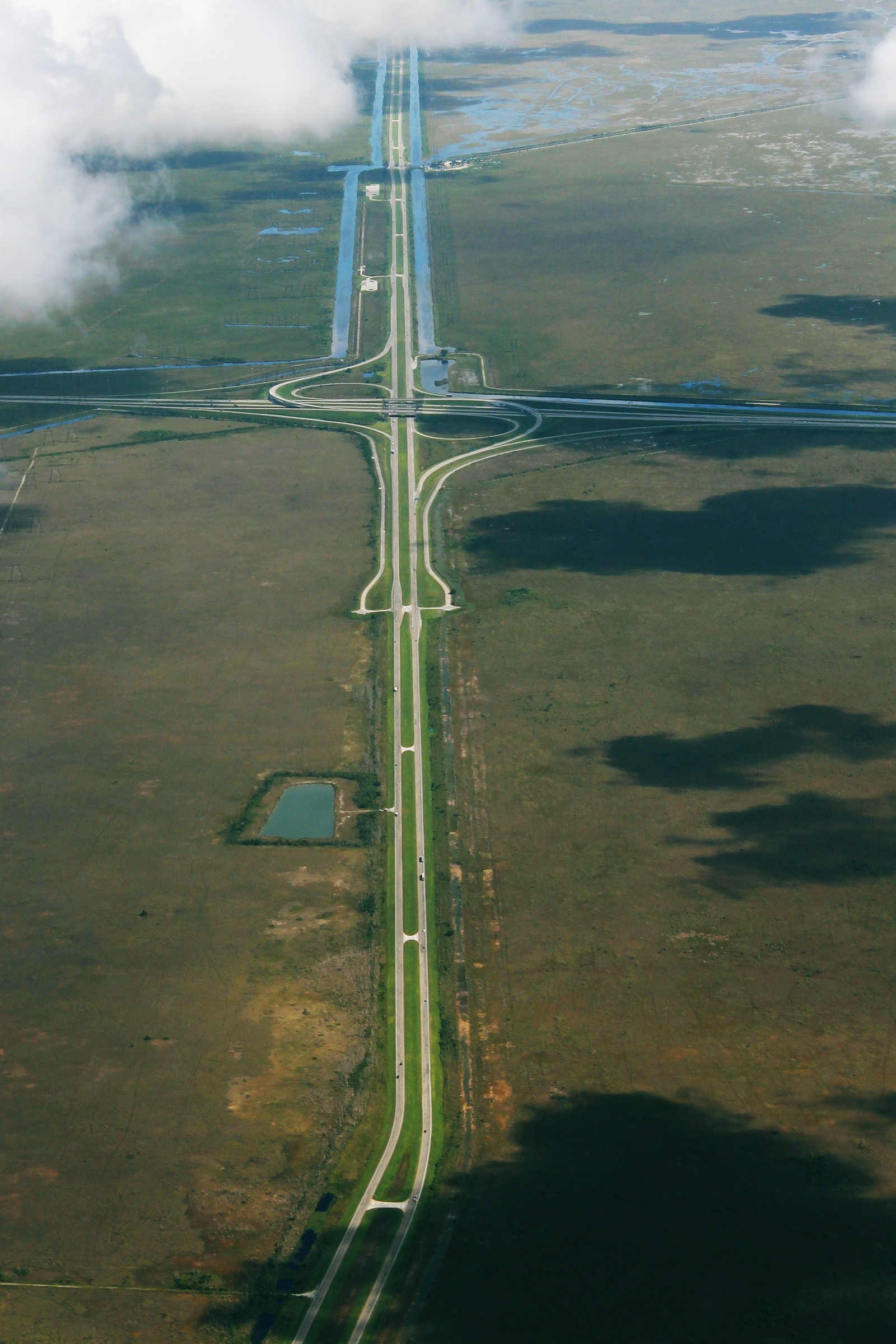
Aerial photo of the interchange (looking north)

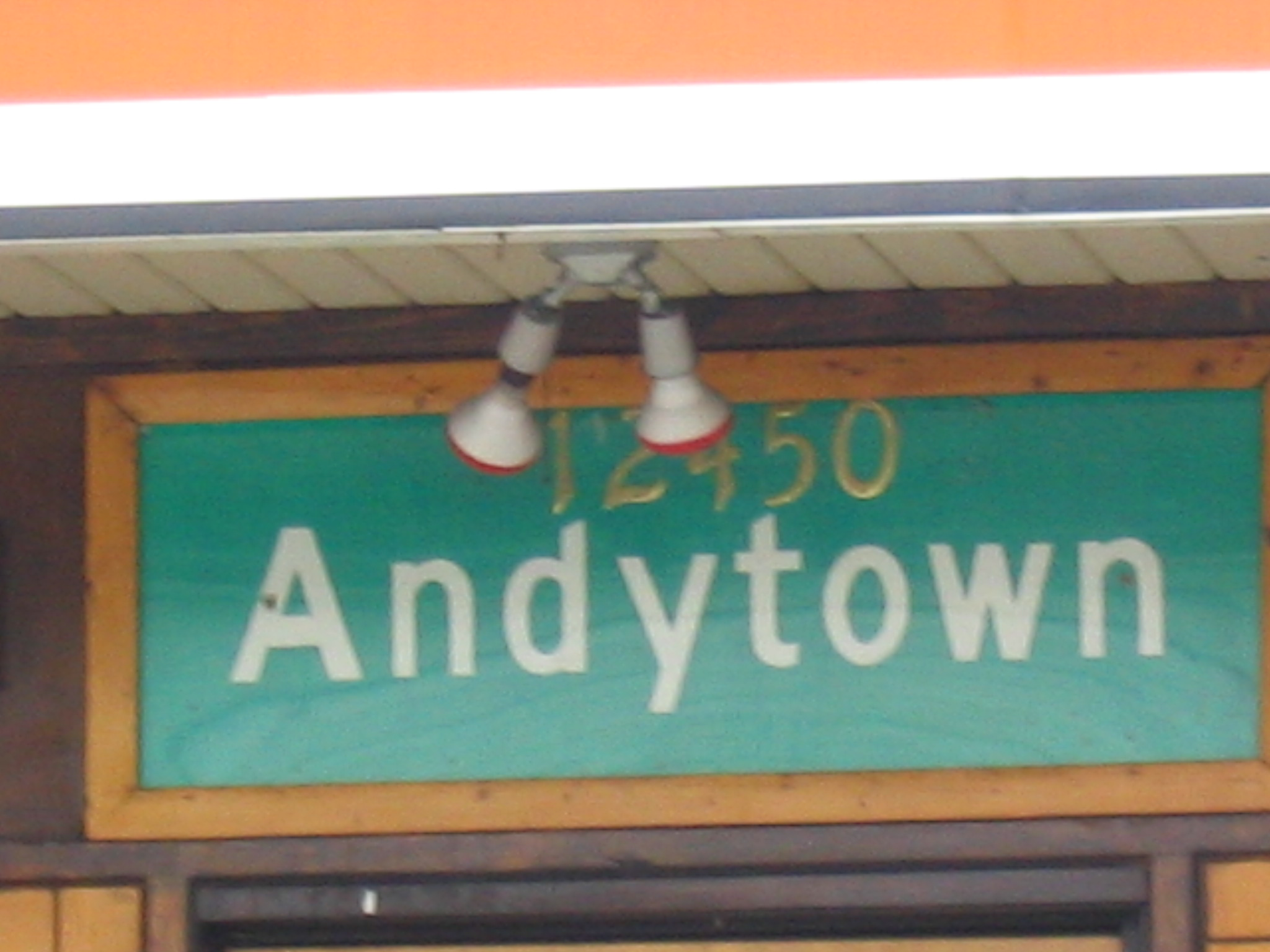
Andytown sign displayed at Andy's Lounge and Package in Davie, Florida

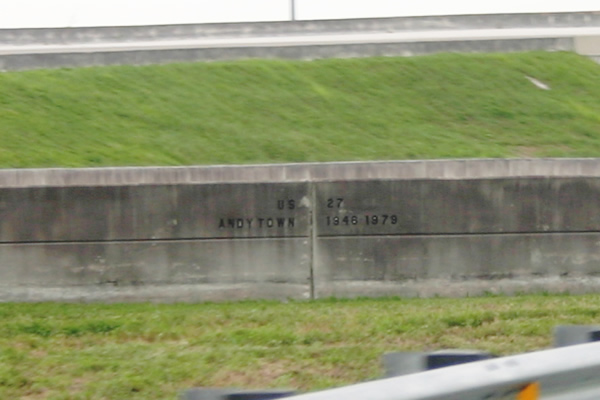
A tribute to Andytown, Florida; this is inscribed on the top of the Interstate 75 (eastbound) bridge abutment spanning U.S. Route 27.

Andytown was a town located in Broward County, Florida, United States at the intersection of U.S. 27 and I-75. It was demolished in 1979 in order to allow for the expansion of the Alligator Alley portion of Interstate 75.

When SR-84 (also known as "Alligator Alley") and US-27 were each two-lane roads, the intersection was controlled by a traffic light. At the southeast corner of that intersection, there was a gas station with a convenience store, restaurant, bar, motel and a trailer where the Andytown pioneers (the Tsanos family of Kosta "Gus"/ Andy's nephew, his wife Litsa and daughter Sophia Tsanos) lived until 1972. Gus and Litsa ( also Greek immigrants) worked at Andytown since 1964. Litsa's brother John Theodore ran the gas station.

Andytown was named after Andreas D. Poulos. A Greek immigrant who bought the business (later named Andytown) in 1946 after stopping for a drink and making the owner of the truck stop an on the spot offer for the building and land. After Poulos died in 1972, his nephew Kosta "Gus" and wife Litsa Tsanos proudly inherited Andytown and continued to work there.

Andytown did not have electricity until 1953. As of 1954, it did not have any telephones; the nearest telephone was located 15 miles (24 km) away.

The 1960s TV adventure series The Everglades was partially filmed in Andytown.

In 1967, the Florida state government took the land for its future use in transportation projects by Eminent Domain. In 1979 the state announced it would demolish the buildings in Andytown in order to build entrance and exit ramps at the intersection of I-75 and US-27. The buildings were demolished in November 1979.

== See also ==
- List of ghost towns in Florida
