= Alexander László =

- Birth name: Sándor ("Sán") Totis
- Born: November 22, 1895
- Origin: Budapest, Hungary
- Died: November 17, 1970 (aged 75)
- Genres: Film score
- Occupation: Composer

Alexander (Sándor) László (November 22, 1895 Budapest (Hungary) - November 17, 1970 Los Angeles, California) was a Hungarian-American pianist, musical composer, arranger and inventor. He was born Sándor ("San") Totis, but used the professional name of Alexander László as a composer and music publisher.

After training at the Franz Liszt Academy of Music, László studied piano with Szendy and composition with Herzfeld and started as a pianist at the Blüthner Orchestra in Berlin in 1915. As a pianist, Sándor László in Freiburg, about 1920, recorded 31 reproducing piano rolls for Welte Mignon, of the piano music of mostly 19th Century Classical composers.

He gave piano recitals in Germany and Europe in the 1920s, and was a music director and professor of film music in Berlin.

According to the studies of the psychologist Georg Anschütz, the mentor of the synaesthesia research of this time, László developed an apparatus for the combination of colored light, slides, moving amorphous and geometrical forms. The first demonstration of it took place under the name "Sonchromatoskop" in 1924. Although this sonicism was developed by music, it should neither serve the intensification of the musical life, nor should individual keys be illustrated by clearly related colors. Rather, it was a new art genre in which abstract images and sound do not behave supplementarily, but enter into an original and inviolable unity. László built a professional Sonchromatoskop and it was controlled by the pianist. In 1925 Laszló wrote a text called Color-Light-Music, and toured Europe with a color organ. Smith & Howe refer to him constructing a 'Farblichtklavier' (Color pianoforte) and publishing a book in 1925, 'Farblichtmusik', which describes the genre.

He also participated in many Jewish lead charities.

In 1938 he came to the United States, starting in Chicago as music professor at the IIT Institute of Design. In the 1940s he was music director at NBC Radio.

In Hollywood from about 1944, he wrote the music for several films such as One Body Too Many (1944), Charlie Chan and the Chinese Cat (1944), Scared Stiff (1945) and Yankee Kafir (1947). Also, The Great Flamarion (1945), The Amazing Mr. X (1949), Tarzan's Magic Fountain (1948), Night of the Blood Beast (1958), Attack of the Giant Leeches (1959), Beast from Haunted Cave (1959) and The Atomic Submarine (1959), and television series including Rocky Jones, Space Ranger and My Little Margie. He established a publishing company to collect ASCAP royalties under the name "Alexander Publications."
