= Michael Emmet =

American film, stage and television actor

- Emmet in The Life and Legend of Wyatt Earp, 1956
- Born: Joseph Kline Emmett II; February 5, 1926; New York, U.S.
- Died: January 1, 2009 (aged 82); San Marcos, California, U.S.
- Occupations: Film, stage and television actor

Joseph Kline Emmett III (February 5, 1926 – January 1, 2009) was an American film, stage and television actor. He was best known for playing Major John Corcoran in the 1958 film Night of the Blood Beast.

== Life and career ==
Emmet was born in New York. He attended the Catholic University of America in Washington, D.C, and acted on summer stock productions. He began his screen career in 1953, appearing in the CBS historical television series You Are There. In 1954, he appeared in the television programs Passport to Danger, Public Defender and The Great Gildersleeve. In the same year, he appeared in the film The Human Jungle.

Later in his career, Emmet guest-starred in television programs including Gunsmoke, The Life and Legend of Wyatt Earp, Perry Mason, The Bob Cummings Show, The Californians, Frontier Doctor and The Sheriff of Cochise, and played the recurring role of Cpl. Davis in the syndicated western television series Boots and Saddles. In 1958, he starred as Major John Corcoran in the film Night of the Blood Beast, starring along with Angela Greene, John Baer and Ed Nelson. He also appeared in films such as The Great Impostor, Gun the Man Down, Untamed Youth, Bombers B-52 and Attack of the Giant Leeches.

Emmet moved to San Marcos, California in 2002. He retired from acting in 2005, last appearing in the film Glass Trap.

== Death ==
Emmet died on January 1, 2009, in San Marcos, California, at the age of 82.
