= Tyler McVey =

American actor (1912–2003)

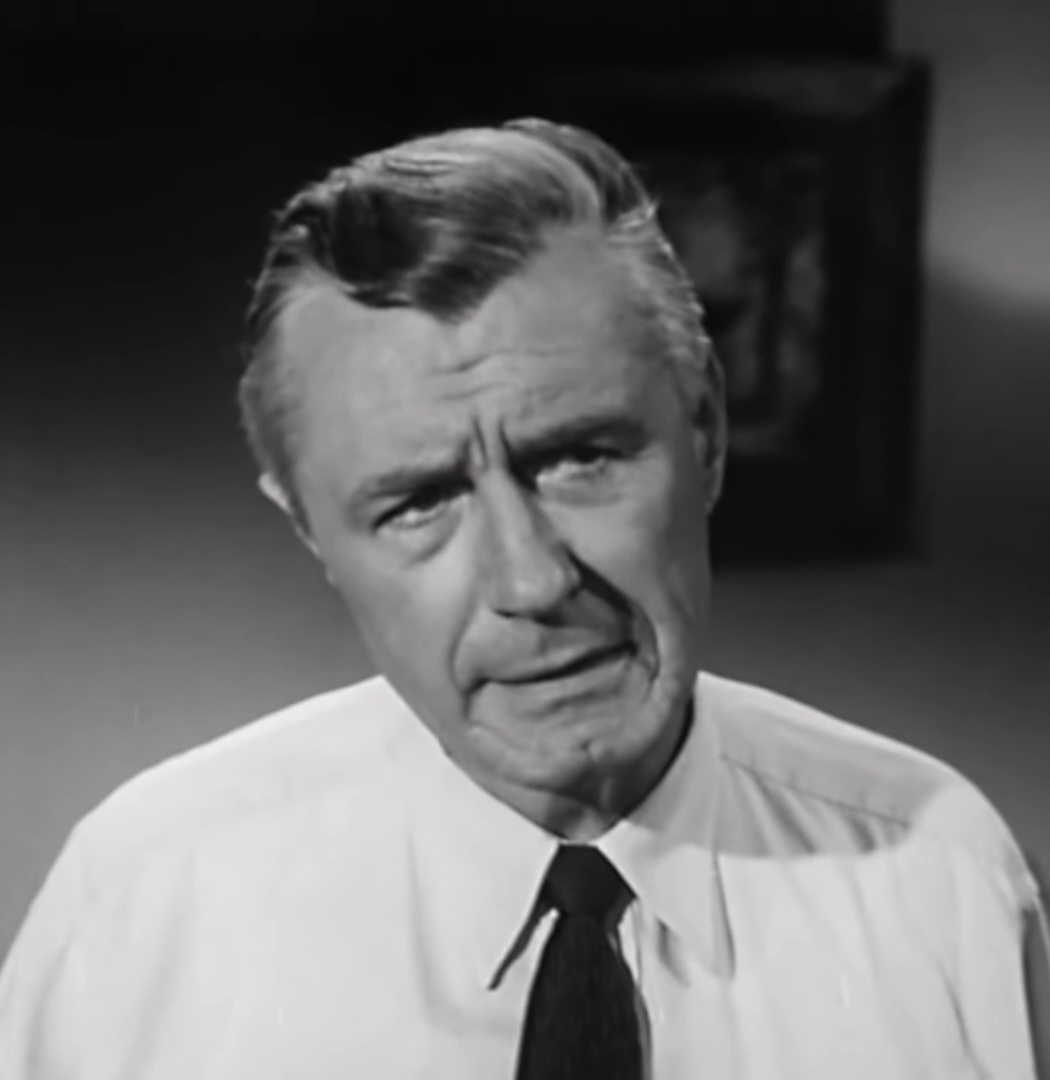
- McVey in Attack of the Giant Leeches (1959)
- Born: William Tyler McVey; February 14, 1912; Bay City, Michigan, U.S.
- Died: July 4, 2003 (aged 91); Rancho Mirage, California, U.S.
- Resting place: Elm Lawn Cemetery, Bay City, Michigan
- Occupation: Actor
- Years active: 1951–1993
- Spouse(s): Lorraine Budge McVey (m. 1937; div. 1948) Rita Ann Stickelmaier (m. 1950; div. 1970) Esther Geddes (m. 1971)

William Tyler McVey (February 14, 1912 – July 4, 2003) was an American character actor of film and television.

== Early years ==
McVey was born Bay City, Michigan, to William David McVey and his wife, the former Jessie Arvilla Tyler. His mother died of tuberculosis when he was one year old and his father allowed his maternal grandparents to raise him. He gained early acting experience in amateur productions in his hometown. He began acting when he was a student at Bay City Central High School.

== Career ==
His first screen role, uncredited, came in 1951, where he portrayed Brady in The Day the Earth Stood Still. He was uncredited in two 1953 military films, From Here to Eternity as Major Stern and in Mission over Korea as Colonel Colton.

He made one of his first television appearances in a 1953 episode of Four Star Playhouse. During the 1950s, McVey guest starred in episodes of many series, including The Restless Gun, Gunsmoke (S2E16 “Cover-Up” - 1957), Dragnet, The Lone Ranger, I Love Lucy, Tales of Wells Fargo, Colt .45, Hallmark Hall of Fame, My Friend Flicka, Highway Patrol, It's a Great Life and Annie Oakley. From 1953 to 1956, he guest starred on the CBS educational series You Are There, narrated by Walter Cronkite. In 1959 he appeared on Wagon Train S3 E7 "The Cappy Darrin Story" as Uncle Hardy. From 1959 to 1960, McVey portrayed Major General Norgath in the CBS series Men into Space.

In 1964, McVey was cast as General Hardesty in the political thriller film Seven Days in May.

Throughout the 1960s and 1970s, McVey continued guest starring in episodic television, including roles on The Tom Ewell Show, Kentucky Jones, National Velvet, My Three Sons, The Rebel, The Everglades, Bat Masterson, Death Valley Days (as cattle baron John Chisum in the 1956 episode, "Pat Garrett's Side of It"), Checkmate, Ripcord, The Wild, Wild West, Bonanza, Gunsmoke, Ironside and Eight Is Enough. His last roles were in 1985 and 1986 as different ministers in two episodes of Highway to Heaven.

McVey also acted on radio programs, including Gene Autry's Melody Ranch, Glamour Manor, and One Man's Family.

== Other professional activities ==
In the 1960s, McVey was president of the Los Angeles, California, local of the American Federation of Television and Radio Artists, later served as national President. He was a founding member of the AFTRA/SAG Credit Union.

== Personal life and death ==
McVey was married three times; first to Lorraine Budge in 1937. After their divorce, he married Rita Ann Stickelmaier in 1950 before they divorced in 1970. In 1971, McVey married Esther Geddes. He died of leukemia in Rancho Mirage, California. He is interred in Elm Lawn Cemetery in Bay City, Michigan.

== Selected filmography ==
- The Day the Earth Stood Still (aka Farewell to the Master) (1951) - Brody (uncredited)
- Washington Story (1952) - Reporter in Senate Chamber (uncredited)
- Diplomatic Courier (1952) - Watch Officer
- Confidence Girl (1952) - 2nd Detective
- Horizons West (1952) - Poker Player (uncredited)
- Back at the Front (1952) - Colonel Daley (uncredited)
- My Man and I (1952) - Defense Attorney (uncredited)
- O. Henry's Full House (1952) - O. Henry, Prologue (uncredited)
- One Minute to Zero (1952) - Joint Operations Officer (uncredited)
- All the Brothers Were Valiant (1953) - John Shore (uncredited)
- From Here To Eternity (1953) - Major Stern (uncredited)
- Mission Over Korea (1953) - Colonel Colton (uncredited)
- A Blueprint for Murder (1953) - Police Lab Technician
- Column South (1953) - Miller, a Southerner (uncredited)
- Code Two (1953) - Chief of Police (uncredited)
- Small Town Girl (1953) - Minister
- Day of Triumph (1954) - Peter
- Dynamite, the Story of Alfred Nobel (1954, TV Movie)
- Francis Joins the WACS (1954) - Referee (uncredited)
- The Caine Mutiny (1954) - Court-martial Board Member (uncredited)
- Alfred Hitchcock Presents (1955) (Season 1 Episode 12: "Santa Claus and the Tenth Avenue Kid") - Security Guard
- Indian American (1955, TV Movie) - Judge
- Women's Prison (1955) - Guard
- New York Confidential (1955) - Crash Car Witness (uncredited)
- The Man Who Tore Down the Wall (1955, TV Movie) - Dr. Stokes
- Santa Fe Passage (1955) - Wagonmaster Lawton (uncredited)
- City of Shadows (1955) - District Attorney's Aide (uncredited)
- Edgar Allan Poe at West Point (1955, TV Movie) - Supply Sergeant
- Creature with the Atom Brain (1955) - Police Officer (uncredited)
- Chicago Syndicate (1955) - Henderson (uncredited)
- The Come On (1956) - Detective Hogan
- Somebody Up There Likes Me (1956) - Reporter (uncredited)
- Walk the Proud Land (1956) - Lang (uncredited)
- Friendly Persuasion (1956) - Farmer (uncredited)
- Mister Cory (1957) - Card Player (uncredited)
- Teenage Thunder (1957) - Frank Simpson
- Night of the Blood Beast (1958) - Dr. Alex Wyman
- Hot Car Girl (1958) - Mr. James Wheeler
- Terror in a Texas Town (1958) - Sheriff Stoner (uncredited)
- As Young as We Are (1958) - Captain Barnhill (uncredited)
- Alfred Hitchcock Presents (1959) (Season 4 Episode 32: "Human Interest Story") - Cargan
- Alfred Hitchcock Presents (1959) (Season 5 Episode 7: "Dry Run") - Prentiss
- Lone Texan (1959) - Henry Biggs
- The Louisiana Hussy (1959) - Dr. J. B. Opie
- A Private's Affair (1959) - General (uncredited)
- Attack of the Giant Leeches (1959) - Doc Greyson
- Wanted: Dead or Alive (1959) (Season 2 Episode 6: "The Hostage") - Sheriff Taggert
- Alfred Hitchcock Presents (1960) (Season 5 Episode 15: "Man from the South") - Referee
- Alfred Hitchcock Presents (1960) (Season 5 Episode 32: "One Grave Too Many") - Desk Sergeant
- The Music Box Kid (1960) - District Attorney Henley (uncredited)
- The Gallant Hours (1960) - Admiral Ernest J. King (uncredited)
- Young Jesse James (1960) - Banker
- Sea Hunt (1960, Season 3, Episode 29) - Sy Baker
- Sea Hunt (1961, Season 4, Episode 9) - Dr. Widmer
- Rawhide (1961) – Dealer in S4:E1, "Rio Salado"
- Alfred Hitchcock Presents (1961) (Season 6 Episode 31: "The Gloating Place") - Sergeant Martin
- The Alfred Hitchcock Hour (1962) (Season 1 Episode 12: "Hangover") - Dave A. Driscoll
- A Public Affair (1962) - Senator Howard Hopkins
- That Touch of Mink (1962) - Doorman (uncredited)
- It's a Mad, Mad, Mad, Mad World (1963) - Police Radio Voice (voice, uncredited)
- Captain Newman, M.D. (1963) - Officer at Medical Evaluation Hearing (uncredited)
- The Alfred Hitchcock Hour (1964) (Season 2 Episode 23: "A Matter of Murder") - Chief of Police Captain J.X. Doran
- Man's Favorite Sport? (1964) - Customer Bush
- Seven Days in May (1964) - General Hardesty (uncredited)
- The Best Man (1964) - Chairman
- The Killers (1964) - Steward
- Lt. Robin Crusoe, U.S.N. (1966) - Captain
- Dead Heat on a Merry-Go-Round (1966) - Lyman Mann
- Banning (1967) - Marco (uncredited)
- Never a Dull Moment (1968) - Chief of Police Greyson (uncredited)
- Hello, Dolly! (1969) - Laborer (uncredited)
- The Resurrection of Zachary Wheeler (1971) - George
- Sidekicks (1974, TV Movie) - Jones
- The Strongest Man in the World (1975) - Regent (uncredited)
