= The Atomic Submarine =

1959 film

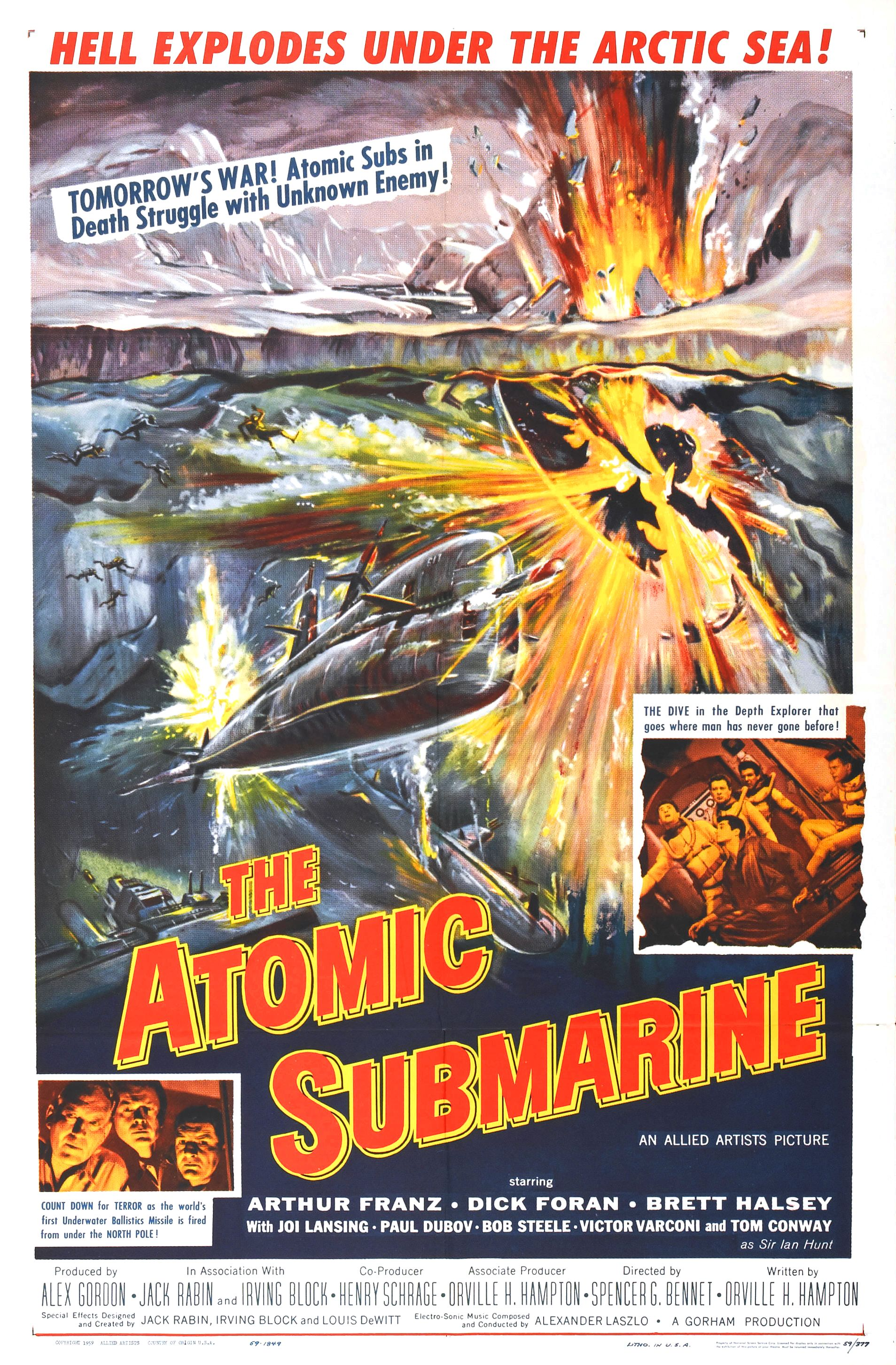
- Theatrical release poster by Reynold Brown
- Directed by: Spencer Gordon Bennet
- Screenplay by: Orville H. Hampton
- Story by: Irving Block; Jack Rabin
- Produced by: Alex Gordon
- Starring: Arthur Franz; Dick Foran
- Cinematography: Gilbert Warrenton
- Edited by: William Austin
- Music by: Alexander Laszlo
- Production companies: Gorham Productions, Inc.
- Distributed by: Allied Artists Pictures Corporation (US); Warner-Pathé (original, UK)
- Release date: November 29, 1959 (United States)
- Running time: 72 minutes
- Country: United States
- Language: English
- Budget: $135,000

The Atomic Submarine is a 1959 independent American black-and-white science-fiction film directed by Spencer Gordon Bennet and starring Arthur Franz, Dick Foran, Brett Halsey, Joi Lansing and Jean Moorhead, with John Hilliard as the voice of the alien. The film was produced by Alex Gordon and distributed by Allied Artists Pictures Corporation.

The storyline of The Atomic Submarine concerns an alien invasion that begins when an underwater UFO (or USO – Unidentified Submerged Object) attacks the world's shipping for unknown reasons. The film showcases the then-new technology of nuclear submarines, and follows the crew and scientists aboard the atomic-powered USS Tigershark, which has been ordered to hunt down the mysterious underwater saucer and stop its disruption of sea commerce.

== Plot ==
A submarine is destroyed near the North Pole by a mysterious undersea light. The loss of this and several other ships in the Arctic alarms the world. Governments temporarily close the polar route and convene an emergency meeting at the Pentagon. Present is Commander Dan Wendover, the captain of the atomic submarine Tigershark, and Nobel Prize-winning scientist Sir Ian Hunt. The United States Secretary of Defense leads the meeting; he explains all that is known about the Arctic disasters, and then describes the high-tech capabilities of Tigershark. These include a special hull and a minisub (Lungfish) that can be stored inside the submarine. The secretary finishes by telling Wendover that he is to take Hunt, Tigershark, and her crew to resolve the ship sinkings, and if possible, eliminate their cause.

Lieutenant Commander Richard "Reef" Holloway, Tigershark's executive officer, learns that his bunkmate is to be Dr. Carl Neilson Jr., a pacifistic scientist whom he dislikes. The Tigershark eventually discovers the cause of the disasters, an underwater saucer-shaped craft with a sole light atop its upper dome. One of Tigershark's scientists, Dr. Clifford Kent, briefly shows a photo of an unidentified flying object, pointing out its similarity to this underwater object. The submariners begin to believe that their quarry is extraterrestrial. The crew nicknames the saucer "Cyclops" because of its single light.

Commander Wendover orders the submarine's most powerful torpedoes fired. They reach the USO, but do not explode, being stopped by a gel-like extrusion coming from within the USO. The captain orders Tigershark to ram the saucer. The submarine's bow tip breaks through its lower side and becomes trapped.

Dr. Neilson pilots Lungfish, taking Lt. Commander Holloway and a small party to board the USO. Holloway has the boarding party cut free the bow with blow torches. Meanwhile, he explores the saucer's dark hallways after receiving telepathic messages from its sole occupant, an octopus-like creature with a single, very large eye. The alien kills all the boarding party except Holloway. The creature explains that, unlike humanity, what they create is made of living tissue. The saucer is a living creature and (as Holloway understands) is healing. The creature announces that it plans on taking Holloway and several other specimens back to its home planet for further study. The aliens plan to modify themselves, based on what they learn about the human specimens. Once finished, they will return to colonize Earth.

Holloway attacks by firing a Very pistol into the alien's single eye, temporarily blinding it. While the eye rapidly heals, Holloway races back to Lungfish and returns to the Tigershark. When Dr. Neilson asks about the remainder of their boarding party, Holloway says, "Fortunes of war".

The now-healed saucer sails to the North Pole to recharge its energy in preparation for leaving. Holloway tells Wendover, "Captain, if that thing ever gets back to where it came from, the Earth and everyone on it is doomed".

The submariners hold an emergency meeting of Tigershark's on-board scientists, and they develop a plan to adapt a torpedo's guidance system to convert it into a guided water-to-air missile. When the saucer rises from the ocean, Tigershark fires the missile, destroying the USO. Holloway and the young Neilson are reconciled, with the latter conceding that his pacifism was no match for a hostile alien.

== Cast ==
- Arthur Franz as Lieutenant Commander Richard 'Reef' Holloway
- Dick Foran as Commander Dan Wendover
- Brett Halsey as Dr. Carl Neilson
- Paul Dubov as Lieutenant David Milburn
- Bob Steele as CPO 'Grif' Griffin
- Victor Varconi as Dr. Clifford Kent
- Joi Lansing as Julie
- Selmer Jackson as Admiral Terhune
- Jack Mulhall as Secretary of Defense Justin Murdock
- Jean Moorhead as Helen Milburn
- Richard Tyler as Seaman Don Carney
- Sid Melton as Yeoman Chester Tuttle
- Kenneth Becker as Seaman Al Powell
- Frank Watkins as Watkins
- Tom Conway as Sir Ian Hunt
- John Hilliard as Voice of Spaceman
- Pat Michaels as Narrator

== Production ==
Producer Alex Gordon had just left AIP after a dispute over casting Audrey Totter in Jet Attack. He sold his next film Life in Danger to Allied Artists. Steve Broidy of Allied agreed to provie 60% of the budget for Atomic Submarine if Gordon could find the remainder. Gordon had registered the title in August 1958.

Gordon wanted John Agar to play the lead but only had $1,500 and Agar would not reduce his price. The producer says Steve Brody insisted on a monster and that there was Navy co-operation.

Principal photography for The Atomic Submarine started 18 June 1959 and took six days. Stock footage of submarines and ship explosions were interspersed with other shots.

== Reception ==
Film historian Paul Meehan considered The Atomic Submarine as "something of a departure from the usual saucer movie formula". Reviewer David Blakeslee, in a later assessment, commented that "once you get past the wooden acting, creaky scripts, stilted narration, corny humor, low-budget props, and sheer implausibility of The Atomic Submarine's story line, you'll find themes and ideas worth pondering a bit longer than it takes to laugh away at the non-stop unraveling of sci-fi B-movie conventions". Chief among the unusual elements is "a headier-than-expected socio-political debate between a young principled pacifist and the career military man and WWII veteran sub captain over the merits of war and peace".

== Related films ==
Two later science fiction films also "starred" nuclear submarines: the USOS Seaview in Irwin Allen's Voyage to the Bottom of the Sea (1961) and the submarine Atragon in the Japanese film Atragon (1963). In all three, a high-tech nuclear submarine of the near-future travels to the deepest part of the ocean to save the Earth from destruction.

Actor Arthur Franz, who played Holloway in The Atomic Submarine, guest-starred five years later on an episode of Irwin Allen's 1964 submarine TV series Voyage to the Bottom of the Sea.

== Home media ==
The film was released by the Criterion Collection as part of their "Monsters and Madmen" DVD set on January 23, 2007.
