= Lisa Janti =

American actress, author and activist (1933–2023)

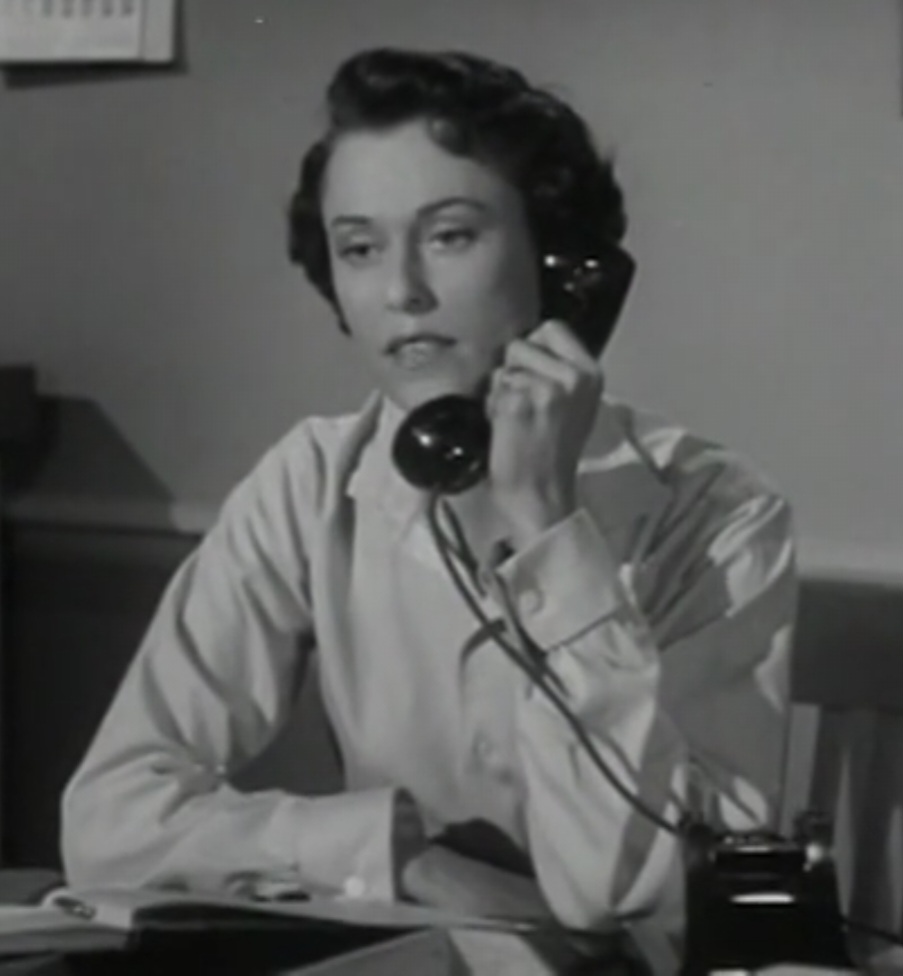
- Janti in an episode of The Public Defender (1955)
- Born: Irena Ludmila Vladimirovna Augustynowic; July 5, 1933; Warsaw, Poland
- Died: March 7, 2023 (aged 89); Van Nuys, California, U.S.
- Other names: Lisa Montell; Irene Montwill
- Occupations: Actress; author
- Years active: 1955–1988
- Spouse: Azemat Janti (m. 1957, divorced)
- Children: 1

Lisa Janti (born Irena Ludmila Vladimirovna Augustynowic; July 5, 1933 – March 7, 2023), known as Lisa Montell during her film and television career, was an American actress, author and activist. She appeared in Hollywood films during the 1950s while also pursuing a parallel career of advocacy and service to disadvantaged groups and to her adopted religion, the Baháʼí Faith.

== Early life and education ==
Irena Ludmila Vladimirovna Augustynowic was born in Warsaw, Poland on July 5, 1933. Of Russian and Polish descent, her family fled Poland before World War II. On arrival in New York they changed their last name to Montwill so she grew up Irene Montwill. They lived in New York and Irene attended the Fiorello H. LaGuardia High School of Music & Art and Performing Arts and transferred to High School of Performing Arts after it opened in 1948, where she became involved with acting.

Her family moved her senior year in high school to Fort Pierce, Florida where she graduated from St. Lucie High School, prior to taking courses at the University of Miami. Shortly thereafter, the family moved to Peru where her father had a business interest.

== Film and television career ==
After becoming involved in English-speaking theatre, she was noticed by Hollywood producer Dick Welding, who offered her a part in Daughter of the Sun God, filmed in Peru (c. 1953) with actor William Holmes; the film was released in 1962. Shortly afterwards, her father died and the family chose to give her the opportunity of a career in Hollywood. Although most of her later career was in the Western genre, Janti would become known as the "Starlet of many faces" as she was able to portray a diverse range of ethnic roles, including Polynesian, Native American, Mexican, Burmese, French, Italian, Spanish, east Indian and Persian. Janti was cast in films such as: Jump Into Hell (1955), Pearl of the South Pacific (1955), World Without End (1956), Ten Thousand Bedrooms (1957), The Lone Ranger and the Lost City of Gold (1958), and She Gods of Shark Reef (1958).

Her first role may have been in 1954 in the TV series The Public Defender, based on the film of the same name. On television, she also appeared as "Rosa" on the TV western Cheyenne, in the episode "Border Showdown" (November 22, 1955); again on Cheyenne as a captured Mexican woman married to a white man (Scott Marlowe) raised as an Apache in "Apache Blood" (1960); in Jane Wyman's Fireside Theater episode of "A Time To Live" (November 27, 1956); in the Sugarfoot episode "Guns for Big Bear" (April 15, 1958); and in the Bat Masterson episode "Pigeon and Hawk" (January 21, 1960). Two years later, she was in the Combat! episode "A Day in June" (December 18, 1962).

== Advocacy career ==
In 1956, she joined the Baháʼí Faith. Janti stated that her family background included a diverse religious family history of Orthodox Russian and Islam (paternal grandmother), Catholicism (father & paternal grandfather), Protestant (mother), and Judaism (maternal grandmother). Janti herself was baptized Lutheran. In addition to her diverse background she explored various religions and philosophies, including studying with Manly Palmer Hall, when she learned of the religion. She learned of the Baháʼí Faith from other actors in a workshop and in her first meeting with Baháʼís they resolved some questions she still had from her previous studies with the teaching of Progressive Revelation. In addition she had a profound personal experience affirming Baháʼu'lláh. For Janti joining the religion played a role in changing her career from an actor to a social development advocate which she felt was a more fulfilling way of serving the religion than as a celebrity.

Her first public talks for the religion began by 1960. She was drifting away from her acting career and began to work on several advocacy/service projects while continuing to work in the arts. About 1962–63 she was a chair of Human Relations Committee of Culver City and was giving talks on race unity. She also worked on Project People which she co-hosted with Tom Bradley around 1963–64 (before he became mayor of Los Angeles) on KCOP-TV, was among the group addressing a panel of Hopi leaders at a World Peace Day observance and gave several talks as part of World Peace Day observances in Phoenix including one in Spanish.

In 1964, she spoke at a Baháʼí youth conference in Pasadena as well as another talk at a Baháʼí event on race unity in Westwood. In 1965, she spoke at a Temple City Baháʼí event, and finally broke from acting completely. She spoke at a 100th anniversary observance of the Baháʼí Faith and moved to Tucson as a director of a reading institute Child Development Centers Inc. After some years of volunteering at Head Start beginning in 1965 in Watts by 1970, she had taken a position directing a Head Start program near Tucson Arizona for the Tohono O'odham on their Reservation.

By this time Janti had also been chair of the Spiritual Assembly of the Baháʼís of Culver City and serving as a delegate to the national Baháʼí convention multiple times. She attempted to pioneer internationally to Ghana but a change in policy of the government ended her opportunity there before she could start. Instead she continued her talks for the religion, and took a position with Bradley's administration after 1973 by being a liaison with various coalitions and commissions, dealing with various poverty, elderly, art and youth programs and continued advocacy through Baháʼí talks for equality for women at different conferences including one highlighting the 1975 UN Women's Conference in Mexico. And she served as chair of the Los Angeles Baháʼí Spiritual Assembly while honoring the educational center Plaza de la Raza with a replica of the Aztec calendar stone.

By the 1980s, Janti left Tom Bradley's staff, took graduate courses, and then served on the faculty of School of Education at National University near San Diego teaching courses in holistic education based on the ANISA model. She also continued to speak at Baháʼí conferences like the Oregon state women's conference, served on the team commemorating Dizzy Gillespie's 50th year in music in 1985 and was on the team giving a "spiritual parenting" workshop at a children's conference in Pasadena in 1987.

In 1992, she worked on projects for the city of Los Angeles and as executive director of U.P. Inc. founded by David Viscott. From November 2000 to September 2001, Janti worked on the Commission on Older Americans for Santa Monica. After publishing an introductory text on the religion in 2005, she served as the program director of the Desert Rose Baháʼí Institute at least c. 2008–09 and she continued to write.

== Personal life ==
Lisa Montell married Azemat Janti in 1957 and gave birth to a daughter, Shireen Janti, two years later.

== Death ==
Lisa Janti died from heart failure and sepsis in Van Nuys, California, on March 7, 2023, at the age of 89.

== Filmography ==
Year	Title	Role	Notes
1955	Pearl of the South Pacific	Momu	Adventure film directed by Allan Dwan
1955	Jump Into Hell	Jacqueline	War film directed by David Butler
1956	World Without End	Deena	Science Fiction film directed by Edward Bernds
1957	Tomahawk Trail	Tula (credited as Lisa Montell)	Western directed by Lesley Selander
1957	Ten Thousand Bedrooms	Diana Martelli	Romance film directed by Richard Thorpe
1958	The Lone Ranger and the Lost City of Gold	Paviva	Western film directed by Lesley Selander
1958	She Gods of Shark Reef	Mahia	Adventure film directed by Roger Corman
1962	The Music Man	Person (uncredited)	Musical film directed by Morton DaCosta; Based on Meredith Willson's musical The Music Man
1988	Big	Person (uncredited; final film role)	Comedy film directed by Penny Marshall
