= Bernard L. Kowalski =

American film director (1929–2007)

- Born: Bernard Louis Kowalski; August 2, 1929; Brownsville, Texas, United States
- Died: October 26, 2007 (aged 78); Los Angeles, United States
- Occupation: Director
- Years active: 1954–2000
- Relatives: Brian Grazer (nephew)

Bernard Louis Kowalski (August 2, 1929 – October 26, 2007) was an American film and television director of Polish descent, nominated for two Primetime Emmys.

== Selected filmography ==
- Frontier (1956) Season 1, Episode 19 The Assassin
- Hot Car Girl (1958)
- Night of the Blood Beast (1958)
- Attack of the Giant Leeches (1959)
- Blood and Steel (1959)
- Mission Impossible (TV Series) - pilot (1966)
- Krakatoa, East of Java (1969)
- Stiletto (1969)
- Macho Callahan (1970)
- Black Noon (1971)
- Terror in the Sky (TV movie, 1971)
- Women in Chains (TV movie, 1972)
- The Woman Hunter (TV movie, 1972)
- Sssssss (1973)
- The Nativity (TV movie, 1978)
- Marciano (TV Movie - 1979)
- Four Episodes of Columbo
- Four Episodes of Banacek
- Episodes of Airwolf
- Episodes of Knight Rider
