= Attack of the Giant Leeches =

1959 film

- Theatrical release poster (as The Giant Leeches)
- Directed by: Bernard L. Kowalski
- Screenplay by: Leo Gordon
- Produced by: Gene Corman
- Starring: Ken Clark; Yvette Vickers; Jan Shepard; Bruno VeSota
- Cinematography: John M. Nickolaus Jr.
- Edited by: Carlo Lodato
- Music by: Alexander Laszlo
- Production company: Balboa Productions
- Distributed by: American International Pictures
- Release date: October 1, 1959 (U.S.)
- Running time: 62 minutes
- Country: United States
- Language: English
- Budget: $70,000 (estimated)

Attack of the Giant Leeches (originally titled The Giant Leeches) is an independently made 1959 black-and-white science fiction-horror film produced by Gene Corman and directed by Bernard L. Kowalski. It stars Ken Clark, Yvette Vickers, Bruno VeSota, and Jan Shepard. The screenplay was written by Leo Gordon. The film was released on October 1, 1959 by American International Pictures on a double bill with A Bucket of Blood. (It was retitled Demons of the Swamp for its UK release.) In some areas Leeches played on a double bill with the 1960 Roger Corman film House of Usher.

Attack of the Giant Leeches was one of a spate of "creature features" produced during the 1950s in response to Cold War fears; a character in the film speculates that the leeches have been mutated to giant size by atomic radiation from nearby Cape Canaveral.

== Plot ==
Attack of the Giant Leeches

In the Florida Everglades, a group of gigantic, intelligent leeches live secretly beneath the depths of a deep swamp. Following the violent death of a local fisherman near the swamp, game warden Steve Benton (Clark) sets out to investigate the cause, despite local authorities blaming the incident on an alligator.

Only a few days after, two more locals, Liz Walker (Vickers) and Cal Moulton (Emmet) go missing near the swamp, while having an affair behind the back of her husband (VeSota), who is wrongly blamed for their deaths (eventually committing suicide while in jail). Search parties are formed throughout the surrounding area looking for the bodies but none are found, and two more men go missing.

Steve, with the aid of his girlfriend, Nan Grayson (Sheppard), and her father, Doc Grayson, discover the gruesome truth, the giant leeches are not only the cause of the disappearances, but are also feeding on their victims (who are imprisoned in an underground cave), slowly draining them of blood. Steve and his friend Mike (Kelley), both divers from the war, dive to the bottom of the swamp. They find the cave's underwater entrance, but are attacked by the leeches. With the use of spearguns and knives, they manage to kill one, but are forced to retreat before they can save a single victim, all of whom are found dead.

The creatures are finally destroyed when Steve, Mike and several state troopers blow up the underwater cavern using dynamite. The bodies of the killed leeches rise lifeless to the surface of the water, but in the film's closing moments, one of the leeches can be seen, still alive and swimming away.

== Cast ==
- Ken Clark as Steve Benton
- Yvette Vickers as Liz Walker
- Jan Shepard as Nan Greyson
- Michael Emmet as Cal Moulton
- Tyler McVey as Doc Greyson
- Bruno VeSota as Dave Walker
- Gene Roth as Sheriff Kovis
- Dan White as Porky Reed
- George Cisar as Lem Sawyer
- Joseph Hamilton as Old Sam Peters
- Walter Kelley as Mike
- Guy Buccola as Giant Leech
- Ross Sturlin as Giant Leech

== Production ==
The movie was one of a trilogy of films Bernard Kowalski made for the Corman brothers.

The film was shot over eight days, including outdoor sequences at the Los Angeles County Arboretum and Botanic Garden. During filming, Gene Corman came down with pneumonia and wound up in the hospital.

Actress Yvette Vickers had appeared as the Playmate centerfold in the July 1959 issue of Playboy magazine, several months prior to the film's release.

Producers Roger and Gene Corman begged special effects artist Paul Blaisdell to create the leech costumes for the film, but Blaisdell said the effects budget was so minute, it would not have even covered the cost of the materials he would need to make the creature suits. The costumes were eventually designed by actor Ed Nelson and Gene Corman's wife, each contributing ideas. Some reference sources say the monster suits were constructed from black raincoats that were stitched together, while others say black plastic garbage bags were used.

Attack of the Giant Leeches is now in the public domain; its copyright was never renewed.

== Critical reception ==
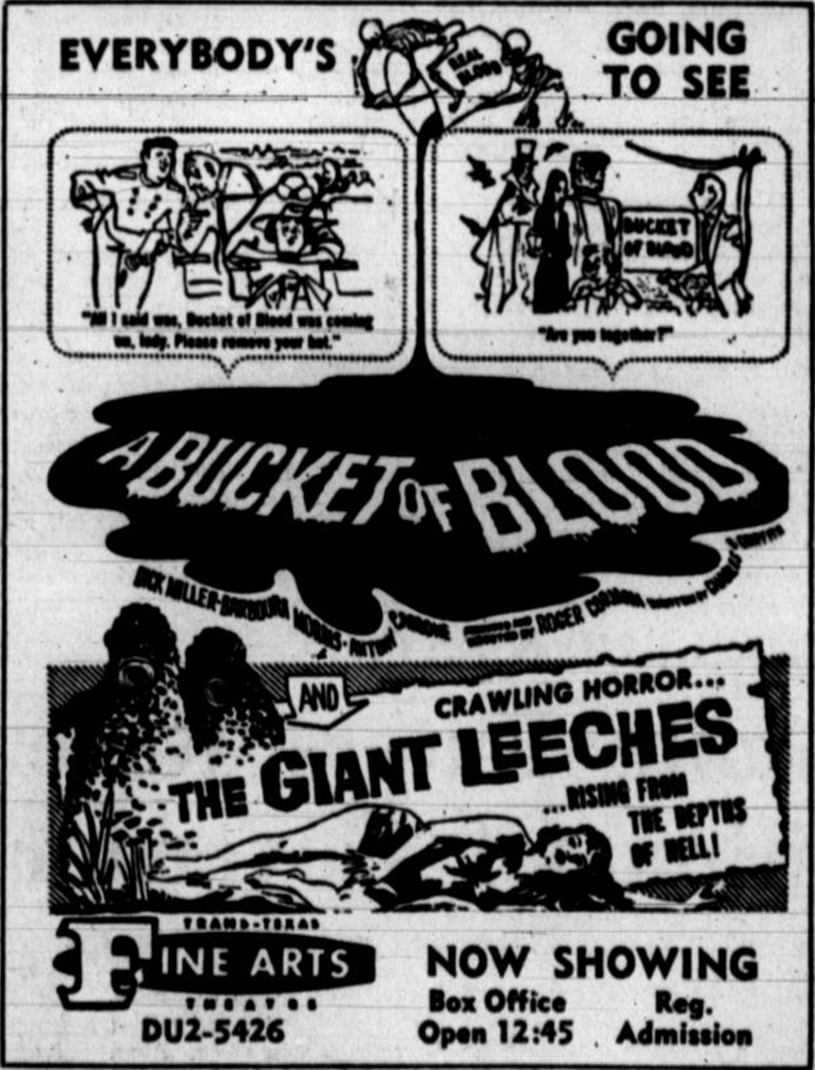
Advertisement from 1959 for Attack of the Giant Leeches and co-feature, A Bucket of Blood

Attack of the Giant Leeches holds a 70% approval rating on review aggregation website Rotten Tomatoes, based on 10 reviews; the average rating is 5.06/10. Film critic Leonard Maltin awarded the film 1.5 out of 4 stars, calling it a "ludicrous hybrid of white trash and monster genres". Other retrospective reviews either regret the lack of scenes showing the monsters (although an expected lack in B movies of the genre) or find them "ridiculous-looking".

A review of the film in AllMovie described it as "uneven at best but the swamp locations, filmed at Pasadena's Arboretum of Tarzan fame, are certainly picturesque and the cave sequence, photographed, according to co-star Yvette Vickers, at the old Charlie Chaplin Studios, at least somewhat creepy," adding that the leeches are "stunt divers wearing what appears to be small ponchos with tentacles." Also writing for AllMovie, critic Cavett Binion described the film as an "hysterical drive-in favorite [that] pits a community of swamp-dwelling yokels against the silliest-looking monsters since the shag-rug aliens of The Creeping Terror", but added that it is "hard to be too critical of this early film from [...] Kowalski, since executive producer Roger Corman allocated a budget for this production that would hardly cover the catering bill on a major studio film—even in 1960!"

== Other Media ==
=== Remake ===
A remake of the film, directed by Brett Kelly and written by Jeff O'Brien, was released on July 7, 2008.

=== Stage Play ===
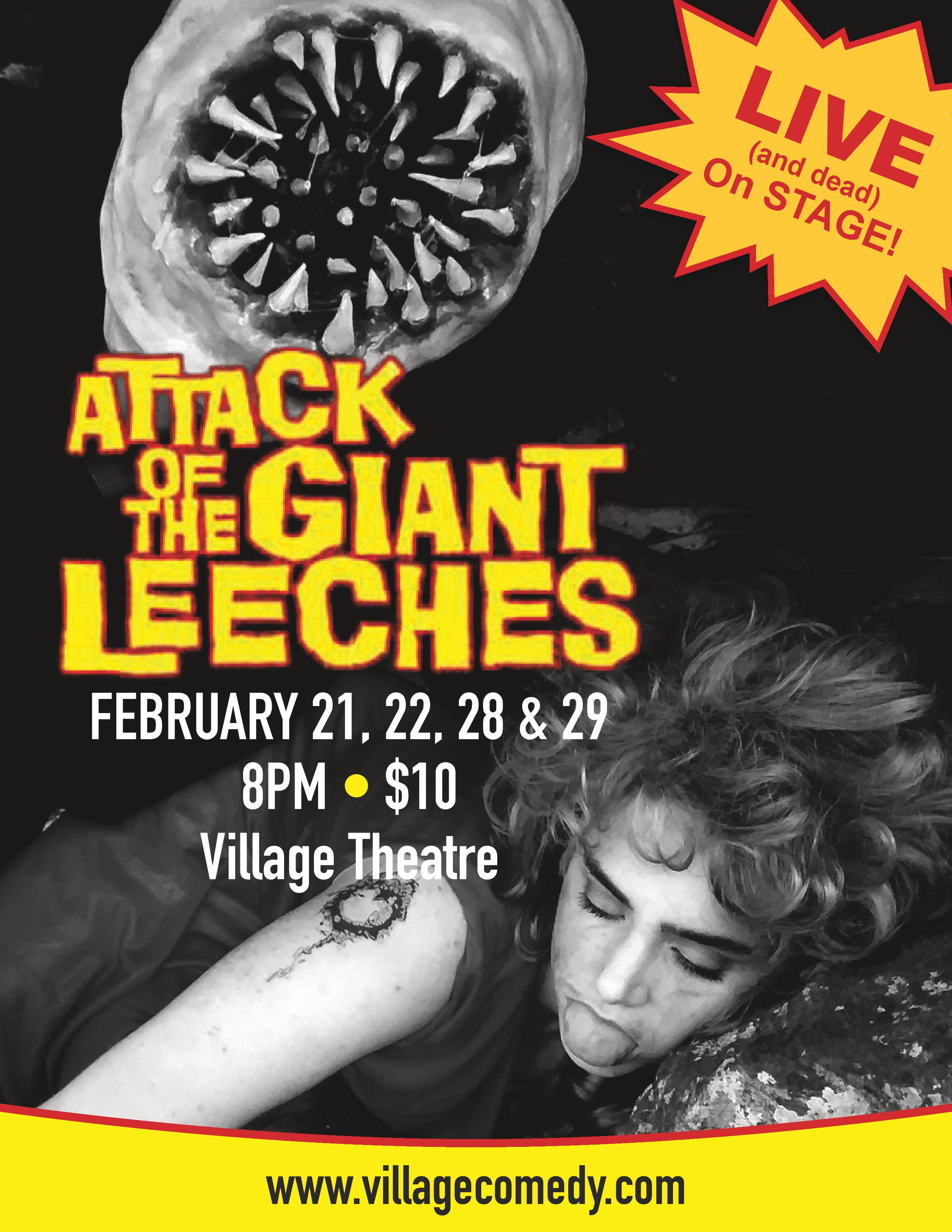
Flyer for the 2020 stage adaptation

A stage adaptation of the original was performed at The Village Theatre in Atlanta, Georgia in February 2020.

== Legacy ==
In July 1992, Attack of the Giant Leeches was featured as a fourth-season episode of the film-mocking television series Mystery Science Theater 3000. It was also featured on the nationally syndicated horror host television show Cinema Insomnia, and in the second episode of season five of Shilling Shockers, a New England–based television show hosted by the witch Penny Dreadful XIII.

== Home media ==
Being in the public domain, Attack of the Giant Leeches has received numerous bargain bin DVD releases. The MST3K version of the film was released on October 26, 2004, by Rhino Home Video as part of a box set, The Mystery Science Theater 3000 Collection: Volume 6. Cheapskate Theater released an HD download of the film on June 7, 2016, featuring a new introduction by Toby Radloff and Radloff outtakes and bloopers. Film Masters' 2024 release of a "Giant Leeches" Blu-ray features a Tom Weaver commentary plus recreations of his interviews with star Yvette Vickers, producer Gene Corman and director Bernard L. Kowalski.
