= Coopertown, Florida =

Unincorporated community in Florida, US

- Unincorporated Community
- Location within Florida
- Coordinates: 25°45′38″N 80°33′39″W
- Country: United States
- State: Florida
- County: Miami-Dade
- Elevation: 10 ft (3.0 m)

Coopertown is a small unincorporated community in Miami-Dade County, Florida, United States. It is located about 20 miles (32 km) west of Miami on U.S. Route 41 (Tamiami Trail). Coopertown is most notable for housing Coopertown Airboat Rides, a tourist attraction founded in 1945.

== Geography ==
Coopertown is located at 25.761°N 80.561°W, at an elevation of 7 feet (2.1 m).

== See also ==
- Frog City, Florida, another unincorporated community nearby on US 41
