= List of Knight Rider episodes =

There are episode lists for all three series in the Knight Rider franchise:

- List of Knight Rider (1982 TV series) episodes
- List of Team Knight Rider episodes
- List of Knight Rider (2008 TV series) episodes
