= Jean Moorhead =

American actress and model

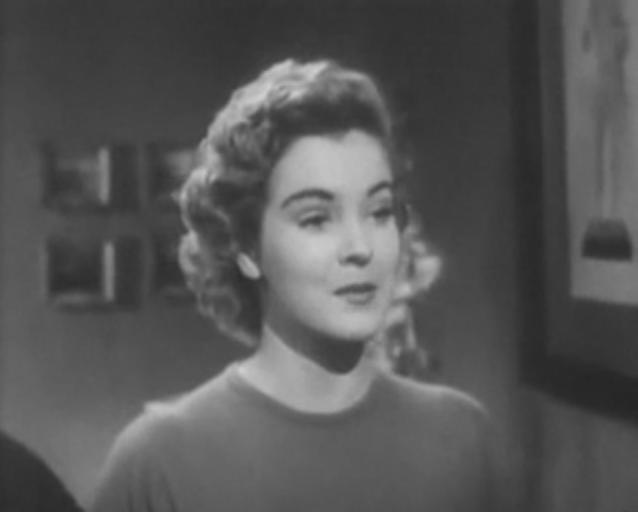
- Jean Moorhead in The Violent Years (1956)
- Born: Barbara Jean Moorhead; February 4, 1935 (age 91); Knoxville, Tennessee, U.S.
- Occupations: Actress; model
- Years active: 1947–1960

Alma Jean Moorhead (born February 4, 1935) is an American retired actress and model. Billed under an alternatively spelled surname, Jean Moorehead, she was Playboy magazine's Playmate of the Month for the October 1955 issue. Her centerfold was photographed by Hal Adams.

== Biography ==
Jean Moorhead was adopted by Henry and Estelle Moorhead. She had a sister, Marilyn Moorhead.

A former Miss Hollywood, Jean Moorhead acted in such movies as the Ed Wood-scripted The Violent Years (1956) and a guest spot on the TV Western Death Valley Days (one episode, 1957). Her last billed performances were in two low-budget 1959 films, Gunmen from Laredo and The Atomic Submarine, with one more appearance in the 1960 Metro-Goldwyn-Mayer musical Bells Are Ringing.

In the 1960s, she married Dr. Theodore Polos and had two children.

Bettie Page	Jayne Mansfield	(no Playmate)	Marilyn Waltz	Marguerite Empey	Eve Meyer
Janet Pilgrim	Pat Lawler	Anne Fleming	Jean Moorhead	Barbara Cameron	Janet Pilgrim
