= Frog City, Florida =

Frog City
- Unincorporated Community
- Location within Florida
- Coordinates: 25°45′36″N 80°35′56″W
- Country: United States
- State: Florida
- County: Miami-Dade
- Elevation: 10 ft (3.0 m)

Frog City is a ghost town and unincorporated community in Miami-Dade County, Florida, United States. It is located about 22 miles (35 km) west of Miami on U.S. Route 41 (Tamiami Trail).

== History ==
During the latter 20th century, Frog City was a small community made up of only a handful of residents. During this period, Frog City was most notable for its sausage trees and a small restaurant that specialized in frog legs, hence the community's name. However, the original community and restaurant has since been abandoned, and among the only things left is the old Frog City sign.

== Geography ==
It is located at 25.76°N 80.599°W, with an elevation 3 feet (0.91 m).

== See also ==
- Coopertown, Florida, another nearby unincorporated community on US 41
