= List of Dick Powell's Zane Grey Theatre episodes =

Dick Powell's Zane Grey Theatre is an American Western anthology television series that was broadcast on CBS from October 5, 1956, until May 18, 1961.

== Episodes ==
=== Series overview ===
Season	Episodes	Originally released		Rank	Rating	Average viewership (in millions)
Season	Episodes	First released	Last released	Rank	Rating	Average viewership (in millions)
1	29	October 5, 1956	June 21, 1957	—N/a	—N/a	—N/a
2	29	October 4, 1957	June 6, 1958	21	27.9	11.7
3	29	October 4, 1958	June 4, 1959	13	28.3 (Note: Tied with Father Knows Best)	12.4
4	29	October 1, 1959	May 5, 1960	21	24.4 (Note: Tied with General Electric Theater and Mr. Lucky (TV series))	11.2
5	30	October 6, 1960	May 18, 1961	—N/a	—N/a	—N/a

=== Season 1 (1956–1957) ===
No. overall	No. in season	Title	Directed by	Written by	Original release date
1	1	"You Only Run Once" "The Hangin' Tree"	Felix E. Feist	John McGreevey	October 5, 1956
Stars Robert Ryan, Cloris Leachman and John Hoyt. With Whit Bissell and Leo Gordon.
2	2	"Fearful Courage"	Bernard Girard	Arthur A. Ross	October 12, 1956
Stars Ida Lupino and James Whitmore. With Michael Pate.
3	3	"The Long Road Home"	Felix E. Feist	Luke Short (uncredited) and Harold Swanton	October 19, 1956
Stars Dick Powell.
4	4	"The Unrelenting Sky"	Felix E. Feist	Aaron Spelling	October 26, 1956
Stars Lew Ayres and Phyllis Avery. With Walter Sande.
5	5	"Lariat"	Felix E. Feist	Harold Shumate and Aaron Spelling	November 2, 1956
Stars Jack Palance and Constance Ford.
6	6	"Death Watch"	Bernard Girard	Otis Carney	November 9, 1956
Stars Lee J. Cobb and Bobby Driscoll. With John Larch and John Alderson.
7	7	"Stage for Tucson"	Bernard Girard	John McGreevey and Harold Shumate	November 16, 1956
Stars Eddie Albert. With Mona Freeman, Rusty Lane and DeForest Kelley.
8	8	"A Quiet Sunday in San Ardo"	Ted Post	James Edmiston and Aaron Spelling	November 23, 1956
Stars Wendell Corey. With Peggie Castle, Gerald Mohr, Morgan Woodward and Harry Lauter.
9	9	"Vengeance Canyon"	Robert Florey	Lawrence L. Goldman	November 30, 1956
Stars Walter Brennan. With Ben Cooper and Sheb Wooley.
10	10	"Return to Nowhere"	Richard Wilson	Lawrence Menkin and Aaron Spelling	December 7, 1956
Stars Stephen McNally and John Ireland. With Audrey Totter, Ralph Moody and Chris Alcaide.
11	11	"Courage Is a Gun"	John English	Frederick Louis Fox	December 13, 1956
Stars Dick Powell, Beverly Garland and Robert Vaughn. With James Westerfield and Claude Akins.
12	12	"Muletown Gold Strike"	John English	Aaron Spelling	December 21, 1956
Stars Rory Calhoun. With Barbara Eiler, Denver Pyle and Dabbs Greer.
13	13	"Star Over Texas"	Lesley Selander	Harold Shumate	December 28, 1956
Stars Ralph Bellamy, Gloria Talbott and James Garner. With Richard Farnsworth.
14	14	"Three Graves"	John English	Norman A. Daniels and John McGreevey	January 4, 1957
Stars Jack Lemmon. With Nan Leslie, Frank Ferguson and James Best.
15	15	"No Man Living"	John English	Norman A. Daniels and Stirling Silliphant	January 11, 1957
Stars Frank Lovejoy and Margaret Hayes. With Peter Whitney, Russ Conway and Stafford Repp.
16	16	"Time of Decision"	Harold D. Schuster	Luke Short (uncredited) and Sidney Morse	January 18, 1957
Stars Lloyd Bridges and Diane Brewster. With Walter Sande and Bill Irwin.
17	17	"Until the Man Dies"	John English	Harold Shumate and Aaron Spelling	July 8, 1957
Stars Carolyn Jones and John Payne. With Stuart Whitman and James Seay.
18	18	"Backtrail"	Christian Nyby	Theodore V. Olsen and Harold Swanton	February 1, 1957
Stars Dick Powell and Catherine McLeod.
19	19	"Dangerous Orders"	John English	Les Savage Jr., John McGreevey and D.D. Beauchamp	February 8, 1957
Stars Mark Stevens and Jack Elam. With Robert Cornthwaite.
20	20	"The Necessary Breed"	Christian Nyby	Clarke Reynolds and Otis Carney	February 15, 1957
Stars Sterling Hayden and Jean Willes.
21	21	"Village of Fear"	Christian Nyby	Antony Ellis	March 1, 1957
Stars David Niven and George D. Wallace.
22	22	"Black Creek Encounter"	Roy Del Ruth	Bob Barbash	March 8, 1957
Stars Ernest Borgnine, Norma Crane and Jan Merlin.
23	23	"There Were Four"	Christian Nyby	Steve Frazee and Berne Giler	March 15, 1957
Stars John Derek and Dean Jagger.
24	24	"Fugitive"	John English	Frederick Louis Fox and Aaron Spelling	March 22, 1957
Stars Eddie Albert and Celeste Holm.
25	25	"A Time to Live"	Lewis R. Foster	Joseph Chadwick and Aaron Spelling	April 5, 1957
Stars Ralph Meeker and Julie London.
26	26	"Black Is for Grief"	Lewis Allen	Aaron Spelling	April 12, 1957
Stars Tom Tully and Tom Tryon. With Mala Powers, Skip Homeier and Mary Astor.
27	27	"Badge of Honor"	Arthur Hiller	John Robinson	May 3, 1957
Stars Gary Merrill and Robert Culp. With Peggy Webber and Walter Coy.
28	28	"Decision at Wilson's Creek"	Louis King	Marc Brandel and John McGreevey	May 17, 1957
Stars John Forsythe and John Dehner.
29	29	"Man on the Run"	Felix E. Feist	Richard Wormser	June 21, 1957
Stars Scott Brady and Nancy Hale. With Hugh Sanders.

=== Season 2 (1957–1958) ===
No. overall	No. in season	Title	Directed by	Written by	Original release date
30	1	"The Deserters"	Jason Lindsey	Otis Carney	October 4, 1957
Stars Dick Powell, Margaret Hayes and Tom Pittman.
31	2	"Blood in the Dust"	Alvin Ganzer	L.A. Pogue & Sidney Morse	October 11, 1957
Stars Claudette Colbert and Jeff Morrow. With Barry Atwater and Denver Pyle.
32	3	"A Gun Is For Killing"	Thomas Carr	Peter Ballas & Aaron Spelling	October 18, 1957
Stars Edmond O'Brien, Marsha Hunt and Robert Vaughn.
33	4	"Proud Woman"	Louis King	Harold Shumate, Clarke Reynolds & John McGreevey	October 25, 1957
Stars Hedy Lamarr. With Paul Richards and Roy Roberts.
34	5	"Ride a Lonely Trail"	Alkvin Ganzer	Marion Hargrove & Kenneth Perkins	November 2, 1957
Stars Walter Brennan. With John Zaremba, Russell Thorson and Vic Perrin.
35	6	"The Promise"	Charles F. Haas	James Leiker	November 8, 1957
Stars Tommy Sands. With Gary Merrill, Carl Benton Reid and Whitney Blake.
36	7	"Episode in Darkness"	John English	Frederick Louis Fox	November 15, 1957
Stars Anne Bancroft and Dewey Martin. With John Anderson and Paul Birch.
37	8	"The Open Cell"	Robert Florey	Barney Slater	November 22, 1957
Stars Dick Powell and Marshall Thompson.
38	9	"A Man To Look Up To"	John English	Marc Brandel, Gorse O'Connor & Aaron Spelling	November 29, 1957
Stars Lew Ayres. With Will Wright, Diane Brewster and Willis Bouchey.
39	10	"The Bitter Land"	Arthur Hiller	Leonard William Moran & Barney Slater	December 6, 1957
Stars Peggy Wood and Dan O'Herlihy. With Marian Seldes and Richard Beymer.
40	11	"Gift from a Gunman"	John English	Russell S. Hughes & Charles A. Stearns	December 13, 1957
Stars Howard Keel, John Dehner and Jean Willes. With Michael Landon.
41	12	"A Gun for My Bride"	James Sheldon	Lee Loeb, Jerry Adelman & Aaron Spelling	December 27, 1957
Stars Eddie Albert.
42	13	"Man Unforgiving"	James Sheldon	Bob Barbash & Frank Waldman	January 3, 1958
Stars Joseph Cotten and Claude Akins. With Johnny Crawford and Dan Blocker.
43	14	"Trial by Fear"	James Sheldon	Howard Dimsdale	January 10, 1958
Stars Robert Ryan. With Harold J. Stone and Edward Platt.
44	15	"The Freighter"	Christian Nyby	Fred Freiberger, Luke Short & Charles A. Wallace	January 17, 1958
Stars Barbara Stanwyck. With Robert H. Harris, James Bell and John Archer.
45	16	"This Man Must Die"	James Sheldon	Jack Guss, Norman Jacob & Russell S. Hughes	January 24, 1958
Stars Dan Duryea. With Carole Mathews, Karl Swenson and Walter Coy.
46	17	"Wire"	James Sheldon	Harry Julian Fink, John McGreevey & Zane Grey	January 31, 1958
Stars Lloyd Bridges and June Vincent. With James Drury.
47	18	"License to Kill"	James Sheldon	Kyle Mason & Antony Ellis	February 7, 1958
Stars Macdonald Carey. With Jacques Aubuchon and Peter Whitney.
48	19	"Sundown at Bitter Creek"	Robert Florey	Carson A. Wiley & Aaron Spelling	February 14, 1958
Stars Dick Powell. With Cathy O'Donnell, Nick Adams, Peter Breck and Jeanne Cooper.
49	20	"The Stranger"	Robert Gordon	Irvin Elman & John Falvo	February 28, 1958
Stars Mark Stevens. With Rachel Ames, Denver Pyle and William Schallert.
50	21	"The Sharpshooter"	Arnold Laven	Sam Peckinpah	March 7, 1958
Stars Chuck Connors and Johnny Crawford. With Dennis Hopper, R.G. Armstrong and Leif Erickson. This episode serves as the pilot for the series The Rifleman.
51	22	"Man of Fear"	James Sheldon	Aaron Spelling	March 14, 1958
Stars Julie Adams and Dewey Martin.
52	23	"The Doctor Keeps a Promise"	Robert Gordon	Luke Short & Harold Swanton	March 21, 1958
Stars Cameron Mitchell. With Carolyn Kearney, Ken Lynch and Ed Nelson.
53	24	"Three Days to Death"	Robert Gordon	William L. Stuart & John McGreevey	April 4, 1958
Stars Michael Rennie. With Chris Alcaide, Earle Hodgins and Tom Brown.
54	25	"Shadow of a Dead Man"	Robert Gordon	Frederick Louis Fox, Aaron Spelling & Zane Grey	April 11, 1958
Stars Barry Sullivan and DeForest Kelley. With Carl Benton Reid and Whitney Blake.
55	26	"Debt of Gratitude"	William D. Faralla	John McGreevey	April 18, 1958
Stars James Whitmore and Steve Cochran. With Walter Sande and Robert Ellenstein.
56	27	"Handful of Ashes"	Robert Gordon	Christopher Knopf	May 2, 1958
Stars Thomas Mitchell and June Lockhart. With Dabbs Greer.
57	28	"A Threat of Violence"	Robert Gordon	John McGreevey	May 23, 1958
Stars Cesar Romero and Lyle Bettger. With Jorja Curtright and Chris Alcaide.
58	29	"Utopia, Wyoming"	William D. Faralla	Aaron Spelling	June 6, 1958
Stars Gary Merrill, Joanne Gilbert and Pernell Roberts. With Myron Healey.

=== Season 3 (1958–1959) ===
No. overall	No. in season	Title	Directed by	Written by	Original release date
59	1	"Trail to Nowhere"	William D. Faralla	Aaron Spelling	October 4, 1958
Stars Barbara Stanwyck and David Janssen.
60	2	"The Scaffold"	Robert Florey	Will Cook & Aaron Spelling	October 11, 1958
Stars Dick Powell. With Paul Richards and Willard Sage.
61	3	"Homecoming"	John English	Bob Eisenbach & Ted Sherdeman	October 18, 1958
Stars Rachel Ames and Lloyd Nolan.
62	4	"The Accuser"	John English	Gene Lesser & Christopher Knopf	October 25, 1958
Stars David Niven.
63	5	"Legacy of a Legend"	Jerry Hopper	Robert Libott	November 2, 1958
Stars Lee J. Cobb, John Dehner and J. Pat O'Malley.
64	6	"To Sit in Judgment"	John English	Harry Julian Fink	November 8, 1958
Stars Robert Ryan. With Michael Pate, Betsy Jones-Moreland and Harry Dean Stanton.
65	7	"The Tall Shadow"	John English	John McGreevey	November 15, 1958
Stars John Ericson and Julie Adams.
66	8	"The Vaunted"	David Niven	Fred Freiberger	November 22, 1958
Stars Eddie Albert and Jane Greer.
67	9	"Pressure Point"	John English	Morris Lee Green & Bill Walker	November 29, 1958
Stars Walter Pidgeon. With Carl Benton Reid, Walter Sande, Pernell Roberts, Dabbs Greer and Stafford Repp.
68	10	"Bury Him Dead"	John English	John McGreevey	December 6, 1958
Stars Barry Sullivan and Joan Tetzel.
69	11	"Let the Man Die"	Roger Kay	Dory Previn & Aaron Spelling	December 13, 1958
Stars Dick Powell. With Marsha Hunt, R.G. Armstrong and John Hoyt.
70	12	"Medal for Valor"	Jesse Hibbs	Edmund Morris & Samuel A. Peeples	December 27, 1958
Stars Richard Basehart. With Richard Anderson and Paul Fix.
71	13	"Living is a Longsome Thing"	John English	Marion Parsonnet	January 1, 1959
Stars Michael Rennie and Michael Landon. With Walter Sande.
72	14	"Day of the Killing"	John English	Frederick Louis Fox	January 8, 1959
Stars Paul Douglas and John Litel.
73	15	"Hang the Heart High"	William D. Faralla	John McGreevey & Luke Short	January 15, 1959
Stars Barbara Stanwyck. With David Janssen, Paul Richards and John Anderson.
74	16	"Welcome Home a Stranger"	Mark Sandrich Jr.	Barney Slater	January 15, 1959
Stars Dick Powell. With Torin Thatcher, Frank Albertson and James Drury.
75	17	"Trail Incident"	Alving Ganzer	Bob Barbash	February 2, 1959
Stars Cameron Mitchell. With John Ericson and Tim Considine.
76	18	"Make it Look Good"	Anton Leader	Nina Laemmle, Marianne Mosner & Francis Rosenwald	February 5, 1959
Stars Arthur Kennedy. With Jacqueline Scott, Parley Baer and Robert F. Simon.
77	19	"A Thread of Respect"	John English	Aaron Spelling	February 12, 1959
Stars Danny Thomas. With Nick Adams and James Coburn.
78	20	"Deadfall"	Jerry Hopper	Frederick Louis Fox & Sloan Nibley	February 19, 1959
Stars Van Johnson.
79	21	"The Last Raid"	John English	Christopher Knopf & Jonreed Lauritzen	February 26, 1959
Stars Fernando Lamas and Rita Moreno.
80	22	"The Loner"	Francis D. Lyon	Aaron Spelling	March 5, 1959
Stars Thomas Mitchell and Don Durant.
81	23	"Hanging Fever"	John English	Arthur A. Ross & Palmer Thompson	March 12, 1959
Stars Beverly Garland and Frank Lovejoy. With Walter Burke.
82	24	"Trouble at Tres Cruces"	Sam Peckinpah	Sam Peckinpah	March 26, 1959
Stars Brian Keith. With Neville Brand, Michael Pate and Frank Silvera. This episode serves as the pilot for the series The Westerner.
83	25	"Heritage"	David Lowell Rich	Christopher Knopf	April 2, 1959
Stars Edward G. Robinson. With Robert Blake, George D. Wallace and Edward G. Robinson Jr.
84	26	"The Sunrise Gun"	Phil Karlson	Bruce Geller	April 16, 1959
Stars Everett Sloane and Dennis Hopper. With Ben Cooper, Karl Swenson and Bill Erwin.
85	27	"Checkmate"	John English	William R. Cox, Nina Laemmle & John Marsh	April 30, 1959
Stars James Whitmore.
86	28	"Mission to Marathon"	John English	Hal Hudson & Christopher Knopf	May 14, 1959
Stars Stephen McNally. With John McIntire, Robert Cornthwaite and Peter Mark Richman.
87	29	"The Law and the Gun"	John English	Frank Gruber	June 4, 1959
Stars Lyle Bettger and Michael Ansara.

=== Season 4 (1959–1960) ===
No. overall	No. in season	Title	Directed by	Written by	Original release date
88	1	"Interrogation"	James Sheldon	Christopher Knopf	October 1, 1959
Stars Robert Ryan and Harry Townes.
89	2	"The Lone Woman"	James Sheldon	Richard Fielder	October 8, 1959
Stars Barbara Stanwyck and Martin Balsam. With George Keymas and Veronica Cartwright.
90	3	"Confession"	Frank Baur	Ellis Marcus	October 15, 1959
Stars Dick Powell. With Charles Aidman, Walter Burke, Jason Wingreen and Rance Howard.
91	4	"The Lonely Gun"	André De Toth	Richard Carr	October 22, 1959
Stars Barry Sullivan. With Wayne Rogers and Paul Birch.
92	5	"Hand on the Latch"	John English	Mary Cholmondeley & Donald S. Sanford	October 29, 1959
Stars Anne Baxter. With Paul Richards and Charles H. Gray.
93	6	"Shadows"	Robert Ellis Miller	Bob Eisenbach & Bruce Geller	November 5, 1959
Stars Frank Lovejoy and Paul Carr. With Dyan Cannon.
94	7	"Mission"	William D. Faralla	Aaron Spelling	November 12, 1959
Stars Sammy Davis Jr. With James Edwards, Felix Nelson, Hari Rhodes, Roy Glenn, Joseph Ruskin and Abraham Sofaer.
95	8	"Lonesome Road"	Sam Peckinpah	Jack Curtis & Sam Peckinpah	November 19, 1959
Stars Edmond O'Brien.
96	9	"King of the Valley"	John English	Mel Goldberg & Edward J. Lakso	November 26, 1959
Stars Walter Pidgeon. With Leora Dana and Karl Swenson.
97	10	"Rebel Range"	Don Medford	Kathleen Hite & Joseph Chadwick	December 3, 1959
Stars Joan Crawford.
98	11	"Death in a Wood"	Paul Stanley	Saul Levitt	December 17, 1959
Stars Dick Powell. With Simon Oakland.
99	12	"The Grubstake"	David Lowell Rich	Luke Short & Harold Swanton	December 27, 1959
Stars Cameron Mitchell and Ben Piazza.
100	13	"The Ghost"	Robert Morgan	Arthur Fitz-Richard & Donn Mullally	December 31, 1959
Stars Mel Ferrer.
101	14	"Miss Jenny"	Sam Peckinpah	Robert Heverly & Sam Peckinpah	January 7, 1960
Stars Vera Miles. With Ben Cooper and Jack Elam.
102	15	"The Reckoning"	Don Taylor	Richard Fielder	January 14, 1960
Stars Cesar Romero and Stephen McNally.
103	16	"Wayfarers"	David Niven	James E. Moser & Luke Short	January 21, 1960
Stars James Whitmore. With Felicia Farr and Walter Sande.
104	17	"Picture of Sal"	William D. Faralla	Laurence Heath & Robert Libott	January 28, 1960
Stars Rod Taylor and Carolyn Jones.
105	18	"Never Too Late"	William D. Faralla	Howard Dimsdale & Bruce Geller	February 4, 1960
Stars Ginger Rogers.
106	19	"The Man in the Middle"	Rudolph Maté	Howard Dimsdale	February 11, 1960
Stars Michael Rennie and Richard Jaeckel.
107	20	"Guns for Garibaldi"	Mark Stevens	Franklin Coen	February 18, 1960
Stars Fernando Lamas. With Mary LaRoche and Al Ruscio.
108	21	"The Sunday Man"	William D. Faralla	Luke Short & Charles A. Wallace	February 25, 1960
Stars Dean Jones, Brian Donlevy and Leif Erickson.
109	22	"Set-Up"	Robert Florey	Robert Blees	March 3, 1960
Stars Phyllis Kirk and Steve Forrest.
110	23	"A Small Town That Died"	Robert Florey	Bob Barbash	March 10, 1960
Stars Dick Powell. With Beverly Garland and Henry Hull.
111	24	"Killer Instinct"	Murray Golden	Larry Cohen & Elliot West	March 17, 1960
Stars Wendell Corey.
112	25	"Sundown Smith"	William D. Faralla	Heck Allen	March 24, 1960
Stars Jack Carson. With Simon Oakland and John Hoyt.
113	26	"Calico Bait"	Robert Ellis Miller	Raphael Hayes	March 31, 1960
Stars Robert Culp and Inger Stevens. With DeForest Kelley.
114	27	"Seed of Evil"	Paul Stanley	Palmer Thompson	April 7, 1960
Stars Raymond Massey and Myron Healey. With Cara Williams and Marion Ross.
115	28	"Deception"	Lamont Johnson	Terrence Kilpatrick & Harold Medford	April 14, 1960
Stars Barry Nelson. With Peggy Ann Garner, Jack Elam and Alan Hale Jr.
116	29	"Stagecoach to Yuma"	William D. Faralla	Luke Short & Charles A. Wallace	May 5, 1960
Stars Dewey Martin and Jane Greer. With J. Pat O'Malley.

=== Season 5 (1960–1961) ===
No. overall	No. in season	Title	Directed by	Written by	Original release date
117	1	"A Gun for Willie"	David Lowell Rich	Howard Dimsdale	October 6, 1960
Stars Ernest Borgnine. With Arthur Shields, Nancy Valentine and Dub Taylor.
118	2	"Desert Flight"	Budd Boetticher	Jim Byrnes & Joseph Byrnes	October 13, 1960
Stars Dick Powell. With James Coburn and John Pickard.
119	3	"Cry Hope! Cry Hate!"	Abner Biberman	Margaret Armen	October 20, 1960
Stars June Allyson. With Paul Fix and Robert Crawford Jr.
120	4	"The Ox"	David Lowell Rich	Giulio Anfuso & Estelle Conde	November 3, 1960
Stars Burl Ives and Whit Bissell. With Edward Platt and Bill Erwin.
121	5	"So Young the Savage Land"	Richard Donner	Stephen Lord & Rudolph Roderick	October 29, 1960
Stars Claudette Colbert and John Dehner.
122	6	"Ransom"	Budd Boetticher	Harry Julian Fink	November 17, 1960
Stars Lloyd Bridges. With Claude Akins and Michael Parks.
123	7	"The Last Bugle"	Budd Boetticher	Otis Carney	November 24, 1960
Stars Robert Cummings. With Michael Pate, Rodd Redwing, Robert Carricart and Rodolfo Hoyos Jr.
124	8	"The Black Wagon"	Tom Gries	David T. Chandler & Aaron Spelling	December 1, 1960
Stars Esther Williams.
125	9	"Knife of Hate"	Otto Lang	John Marsh	December 8, 1960
Stars Robert Harland, Susan Oliver and Lloyd Nolan. With Marjorie Bennett.
126	10	"The Mormons"	Dick Moder	Lou Morheim	December 3, 1960
Stars Stephen McNally and Tuesday Weld. With Mark Goddard.
127	11	"The Man from Yesterday"	Otto Lang	Don Ingalls	December 22, 1960
Stars Wendell Corey. With Marsha Hunt, John Anderson and Cubby O'Brien.
128	12	"Morning Incident"	Tom Gries	Mort Thaw	December 29, 1960
Stars Martha Hyer and Robert Culp.
129	13	"Ambush"	Budd Boetticher	Richard Fielder	January 5, 1961
Stars Dick Powell. With Arch Johnson, Jack Elam, Harry Dean Stanton and Don Dubbins.
130	14	"One Must Die"	Lewis Allen	Peter Germano	January 12, 1961
Stars Joan Crawford. With Philip Carey, Ben Wright and Carl Benton Reid.
131	15	"The Long Shadow"	Budd Boetticher	Richard Fielder	January 19, 1961
Stars Ronald Reagan and Nancy Reagan. With Roberta Shore and Walter Sande.
132	16	"Blood Red"	David Lowell Rich	Stephen Lord	January 26, 1961
Stars Carolyn Jones and Sterling Holloway. With Iron Eyes Cody, Charlie Briggs, Eddie Little Sky, Chief Yowlachie and Paul Richards.
133	17	"Honor Bright"	Robert Ellis Miller	John Furia	February 2, 1961
Stars Danny Thomas. With Ed Nelson, Grace Lee Whitney and Marlo Thomas.
134	18	"The Broken Wing"	Don Taylor	Christopher Knopf	February 9, 1961
Stars David Ladd, John Larch and Arthur O'Connell.
135	19	"The Silent Sentry"	Norman S. Powell	Aaron Spelling	February 16, 1961
Stars Dick Powell and Don Taylor. With James Whitmore.
136	20	"The Bible Man"	Don Taylor	Elizabeth Campbell Ward & Walter Wagner	February 23, 1961
Stars Art Linkletter. With Jack Linkletter and Peter Whitney.
137	21	"The Scar"	Dick Moder	Shirl Hendryx	March 2, 1961
Stars Lew Ayres and Patricia Barry. With Alan Hale Jr. and Mort Mills.
138	22	"Knight of the Sun"	Don Taylor	John Furia	March 9, 1961
Stars Dan Duryea and Constance Towers.
139	23	"A Warm Day in Heaven"	Don Taylor	Howard Dimsdale & Aaron Spelling	March 23, 1961
Stars Lon Chaney Jr. and Thomas Mitchell. With William Schallert, Hank Patterson, Bill Erwin and Ken Mayer.
140	24	"The Empty Shell"	David Lowell Rich	Paul Franklin & Bruce Geller	March 30, 1961
Stars Jan Murray and Jean Hagen. With Denver Pyle and Dub Taylor.
141	25	"The Atoner"	Laslo Benedek	Howard Dimsdale	April 6, 1961
Stars Britt Lomond. With Herbert Marshall, Edward Binns and Virginia Gregg.
142	26	"Man from Everywhere"	Don Taylor	Frederick Louis Fox	April 13, 1961
Stars Cesar Romero and King Calder. With Peter Whitney, Ruta Lee, Dabbs Greer and Burt Reynolds.
143	27	"The Release"	Joseph H. Lewis	Calvin Clements Sr.	April 27, 1961
Stars Gary Merrill and Cesare Danova. With Lee Kinsolving and Vito Scotti.
144	28	"Storm Over Eden"	Dick Moder	Stephen Lord	May 4, 1961
Stars John Derek and Nancy Gates. With Robert Middleton.
145	29	"Image of a Drawn Sword"	Bernard L. Kowalski	Christopher Knopf	May 11, 1961
Stars Lloyd Bridges, Beau Bridges and Royal Dano. With Susan Oliver.
146	30	"Jericho"	Harry Keller	Herb Meadow & Helen Ainsworth	May 18, 1961
Stars Guy Madison and Beverly Garland. With Claude Akins, John Hoyt and Les Tremayne.
