= Big Town =

Radio drama series

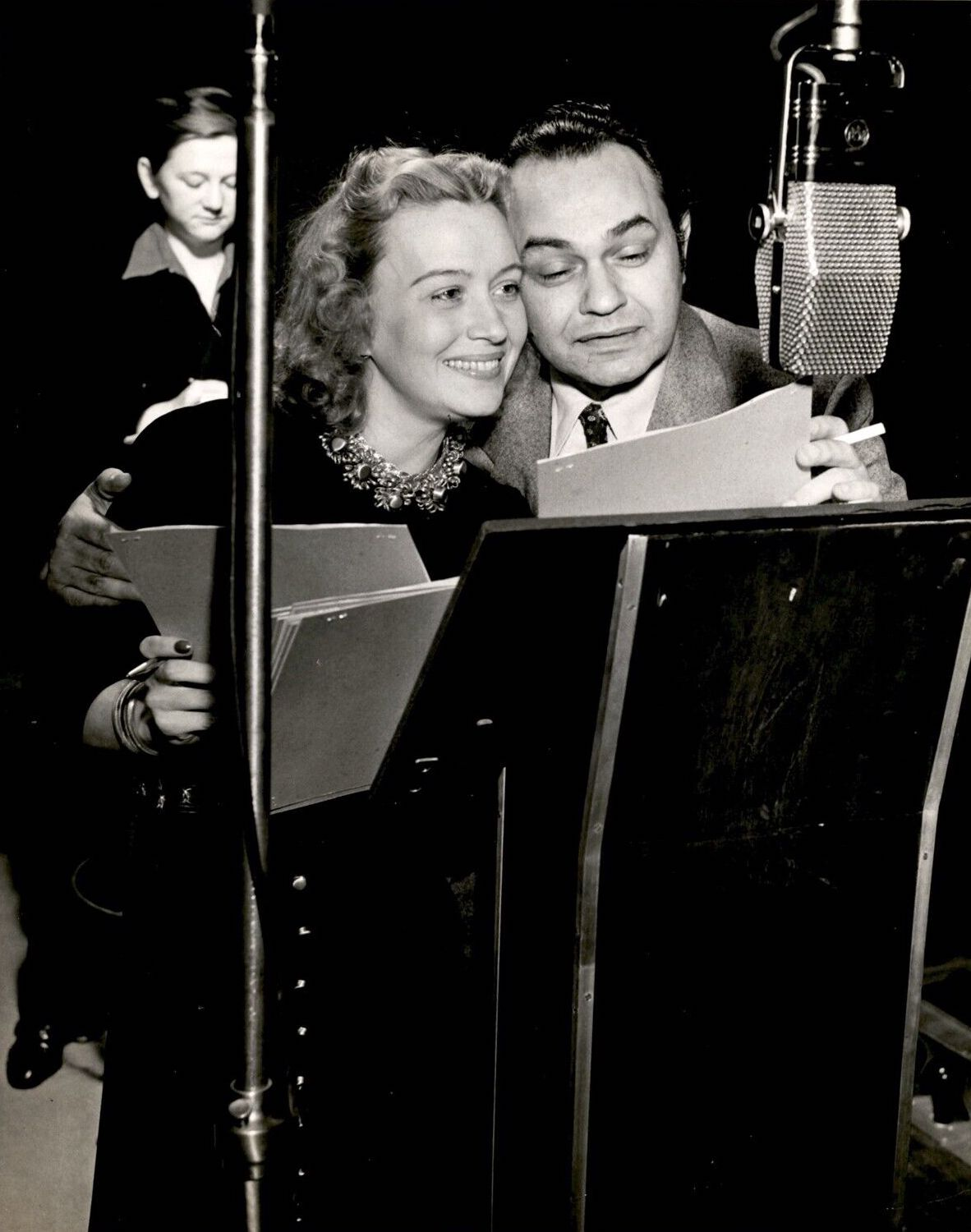
- Ona Munson and Edward G. Robinson recording the series in 1941
- Genre: Drama
- Written by: Ewald André Dupont; Lawrence Kimble
- Directed by: Busby Berkeley; Ewald André Dupont; Charles F. Haas; Mark Stevens; Gunther von Fritsch
- Country of origin: United States
- Original language: English
- No. of seasons: 6
- No. of episodes: 169

Production
- Producers: Jack J. Gross; Philip N. Krasne; Mark Stevens
- Running time: 25 mins.

Original release
- Network: CBS (1950–1954); NBC (1955–1956)
- Release: October 5, 1950 – October 7, 1956

Big Town is a popular long-running radio drama featuring a corruption-fighting newspaper editor initially played from 1937 to 1942 by film star Edward G. Robinson in his first radio role, with echoes of the conscience-stricken tabloid editor he had played in the film Five Star Final. Edward Pawley played the lead role longer, 1943–52, in plots that made the editor more of a hands-on crime-fighter. During the later Pawley years, Big Town was adapted to film and television series, and a comic book published by DC Comics.

== Radio ==
The radio program aired from October 19, 1937, to June 25, 1952. It was produced by William N. Robson and Crane Wilbur, and written by Jerry McGill. Theme music was by Fran Frey. Edward G. Robinson had the lead role of Steve Wilson, crusading editor of the Illustrated Press, from 1937 to 1943. Claire Trevor was Wilson's reporter sidekick "Lorelei," with Ona Munson taking over that role in 1939. The female lead evolved from the initial script's description as "the society editor who writes under the name of 'Lorelei'" to star crime reporter "Lorelei Kilbourne," with no hint that her first name was a stylized byline. She provided the tabloid-minded Wilson with a conscience in the early episodes, not unlike the editor's secretary in Robinson's Oscar-nominated Five Star Final in 1931.

Edward J. Pawley portrayed Steve Wilson from 1943 until 1952 when Walter Greaza was heard as Wilson in the final episodes. Fran Carlon played Lorelei to Pawley's Wilson from 1943 to 1952. During the period in which Pawley starred, Big Town was rated No. 1 among all of the reporter-type drama series on radio. It was also rated in the top 12 among all radio programs broadcast and had a listening audience rated between 10 and 20 million people.

Ken Niles was the announcer.

== Films ==
Four films based on the radio series were made by Paramount Pictures' Pine-Thomas Productions studio: Big Town (1947), I Cover Big Town (1947), Big Town After Dark (1947), and Big Town Scandal (1948). All four films starred Phillip Reed as Wilson and Hillary Brooke as Lorelei, all were based on radio- and/or screenplays by Maxwell Shane, and all were produced and directed by William C. Thomas.

== Television ==
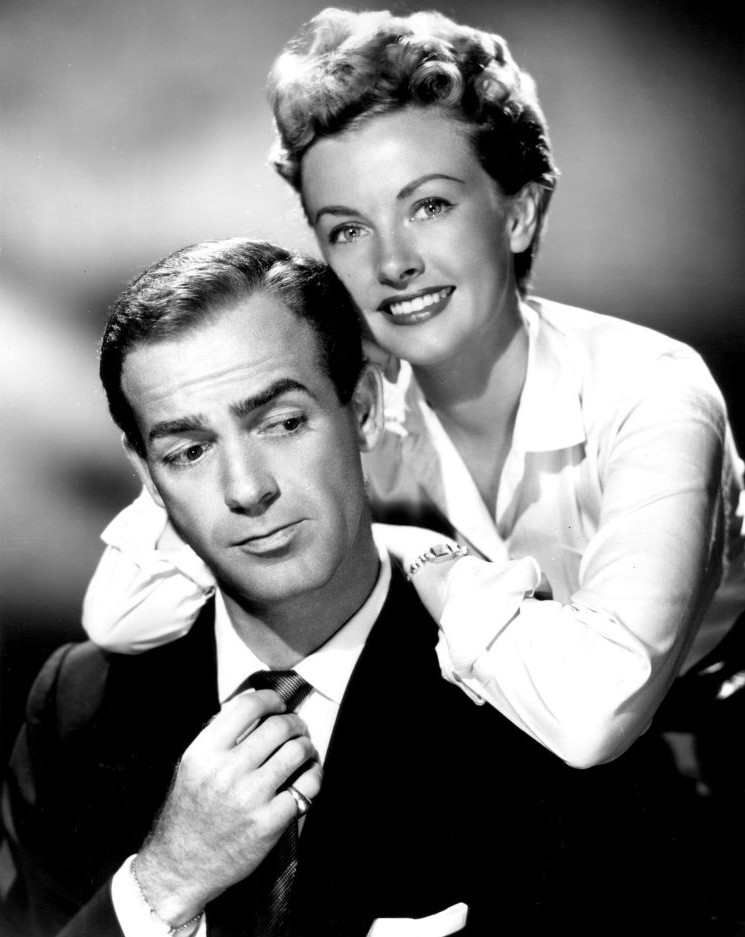
Mark Stevens as Steve Wilson and Trudy Wroe as Lorelei Kilbourne (1954)

When Big Town moved to television, the program was telecast live, but in 1952 the production switched to film after the move from New York City to Hollywood. The television series ran on CBS from 1950 through 1954, continuing on NBC from 1955 through 1956. Repeat episodes aired on the DuMont Network beginning on February 6, 1953, under the title City Assignment, while Big Town was still showing first-run episodes on CBS. Reruns were also shown under the titles Heart of the City, Headline, and Byline Steve Wilson.

The stories revolved around The Illustrated Press, the city's largest newspaper, and the people who worked for it, most particularly managing editor Steve Wilson (played by Patrick McVey from 1950 to 1954 and by Mark Stevens from 1954 to 1956). Five actresses had the role of reporter Lorelei Kilbourne. In its sixth and final season, the series would adopt the documentary style made famous by Dragnet, right down to Stevens producing, writing, and directing most of the episodes.

Jack J. Gross and Philip N. Krasne (Gross-Krasne Productions) produced the program in 1952.

== Television ratings ==
Big Town #38 (March–April 1956)

- 1950–1951: #21
- 1951–1952: #15
- 1952–1953: out of the top 30
- 1953–1954: out of the top 30

== Comic book ==
DC's Big Town comic book ran 50 issues, from January 1951 to March–April 1958. The comic book was edited by Whitney Ellsworth, and the contributing artists included Dan Barry, Carmine Infantino, Gil Kane, John Lehti, Manny Stallman and Alex Toth, with most of the later scripts written by John Broome.

== See also ==
- List of programs broadcast by the DuMont Television Network
- List of surviving DuMont Television Network broadcasts

== Listen to ==
- RadioLovers: Big Town "Occupied Paris" (9/5/42)
- Zoot Radio, free 'Big Town' old time radio show downloads
