= Trudy Wroe =

American actress (1931–2007)

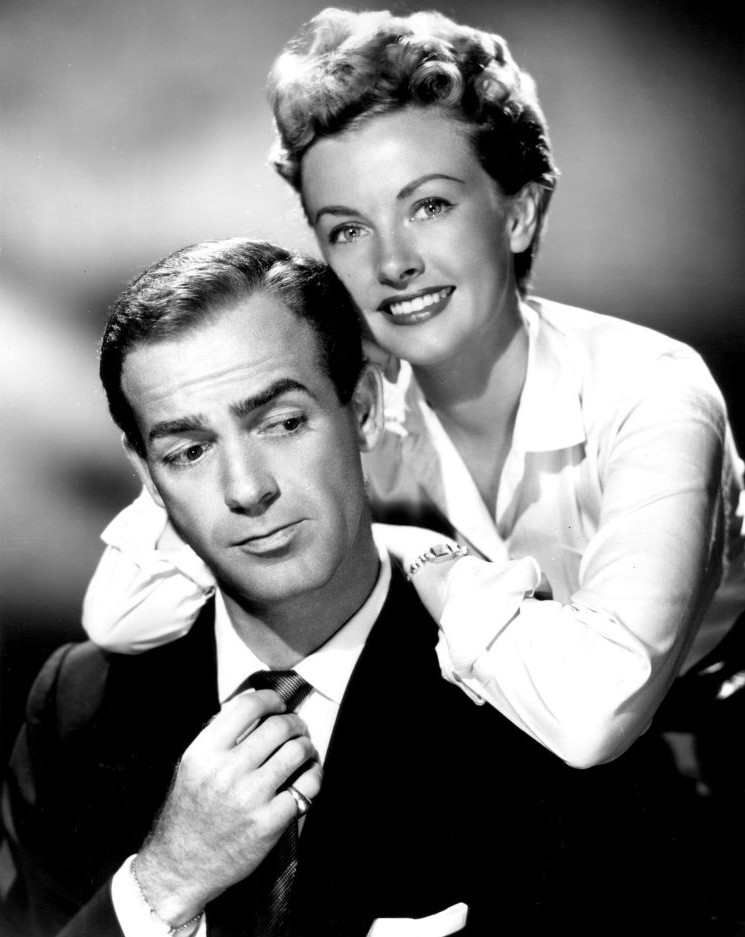
- Mark Stevens and Wroe as Lorelei Kilbourne in Big Town (1954)
- Born: May 25, 1931; Los Angeles, California, U.S.
- Died: November 10, 2007 (aged 76)
- Occupation: Actress
- Spouse: Don Durant (m. 1959; died 2005)
- Children: 2

Trudy Wroe (May 25, 1931 – November 10, 2007) was an American actress.

== Early years ==
Born in Los Angeles, Wroe majored in art at Manual Arts High School, as she planned a career as a commercial artist.

== Career ==
In the early 1950s, Wroe worked as a model for the Mary Webb Davis agency. She was selected for designations including Queen of the Exhibition of West Coast Advertising Art, Queen of Holiday on Wings, Fireworks Queen, and Queen of the National Los Angeles Home Show.

Also in the early 1950s, Wroe teamed with Tommy Irish to make television commercials for Paper Mate pens. By 1954, they had appeared in more than 5,000 radio and TV commercials for the company and had been signed to a five-year contract to continue their work. They were named "outstanding personalities in television commercials" in 1953 and received more than 300 letters a week from fans.

On television, Wroe portrayed Lorelei Kilbourne on Big Town (1954). She survived two months of competition from more than 100 actresses to become the fourth woman to play that role.

Wroe worked as a chorus girl in Las Vegas, and in 1954, she was a contract actress with Columbia Pictures. She retired from acting after her 1959 marriage.

== Personal life ==
In 1959, Wroe married actor Don Durant. They had two children and were still married when he died in 2005. She died in 2007.
