= The Dark Corner =

1946 film by Henry Hathaway

- Theatrical release one sheet poster
- Directed by: Henry Hathaway
- Screenplay by: Jay Dratler; Bernard C. Schoenfeld (as Bernard Schoenfeld)
- Based on: The Dark Corner; 1945 serial story in Good Housekeeping by Leo Rosten
- Produced by: Fred Kohlmar
- Starring: Lucille Ball; Clifton Webb; William Bendix; Mark Stevens
- Cinematography: Joseph MacDonald (as Joe Mac Donald)
- Edited by: J. Watson Webb Jr. (as J. Watson Webb)
- Music by: Cyril J. Mockridge (as Cyril Mockridge)
- Color process: Black and white
- Production company: 20th Century Fox
- Distributed by: 20th Century Fox
- Release date: May 8, 1946
- Running time: 99 minutes
- Country: United States
- Language: English
- Budget: $1.2 million
- Box office: $1 million

The Dark Corner is a 1946 American crime film noir directed by Henry Hathaway and starring Lucille Ball, Clifton Webb, William Bendix, and Mark Stevens. The film was not a commercial success, but has since been described as a "Grade A example of film noir."

Hathaway said that The Dark Corner was "not a successful film. It was dead. Mark Stevens never quite cut it. Too arrogant, cocksure."

== Plot ==
Private investigator Bradford Galt has moved from San Francisco to New York to escape a troubled past. He blames his former partner Tony Jardine for his problems. Complicating matters, he is hounded by New York police lieutenant Frank Reeves and pursued by a thug in a white suit. The thug is seemingly forced to admit that he has been hired by Jardine, but he has not been hired by Jardine. That is a lie made up by wealthy art gallery owner Hardy Cathcart, who actually hired the thug, to induce Galt to harm Jardine.

Galt suspects that Jardine is trying to frame him for a murder, but Jardine, who has been having a secret affair with Cathcart's young wife, is Cathcart's intended victim. With the help of his sharp-witted secretary Kathleen, Galt is able to overcome all of these obstacles and clear himself.

== Cast ==
- Lucille Ball as Kathleen Stewart
- Clifton Webb as Hardy Cathcart
- William Bendix as Stauffer aka Fred Foss
- Mark Stevens as Bradford Galt
- Kurt Kreuger as Tony Jardine
- Cathy Downs as Mari Cathcart
- Reed Hadley as Police Lt Frank Reeves
- Constance Collier as Mrs. Kingsley
- Eddie Heywood and His Orchestra

== Production ==
Fox paid $40,000 for the rights to Leo Rosten's story prior to its publication in Good Housekeeping. Rosten published the story under the pen name Leonard Q. Ross.

The film's locations included office buildings in Manhattan, the streets of the Bowery, and the Third Avenue El. The arcade sequence was filmed in Santa Monica, California.

Ida Lupino was initially cast as Kathleen, but was forced to withdraw because of scheduling conflicts, and Fred MacMurray was originally slated for the role of Galt.

Studio production head Darryl F. Zanuck borrowed Lucille Ball from MGM to play Kathleen. At the time, Ball was trying to break from MGM and had an "unsettled" personal life. A Henry Hathaway biographer wrote: "Early into the shoot, it was obvious to Hathaway that Ball was not concentrating on her job. After she flubbed her lines one time too many, Hathaway embarrassed her before her peers by ordering her to leave the set and actually read the script." However, some regarded the role as one of Ball's finer dramatic performances. According to Hathaway, Ball subsequently apologized for her behavior.

Hathaway described Webb as an "angel, but he never really was a good actor. He was a character. He was marvelous because he was so elegant."

== Reception ==
=== Critical ===
In a contemporary review for The New York Times, critic Thomas M. Pryor called The Dark Corner "tough-fibered, exciting entertainment" and wrote: "When a talented director and a resourceful company of players meet up with a solid story, say one such as The Dark Corner, then movie-going becomes a particular pleasure. ... Henry Hathaway has drawn superior performances from most of the cast. ... His fine craftsmanship is very evident throughout 'The Dark Corner,' and it is regrettable that he had to mar the atmospheric realism by resorting to scene-faking in a few sequences. But this is a minor shortcoming in an otherwise sizzling piece of melodrama."

Also in 1946, Baltimore Sun critic Donald Kirkley wrote that the film "is very good indeed for this sort of uninhibited whodunit" and was "sparked by a most engaging performance by Lucille Ball" and "a very fine, hard-boiled portrayal of a tough guy by William Bendix." However, Kirkley criticized the script, feeling that Webb's character's motivation is unclear, and that the film often "speeds into high gear, but just as often relaxes into spells of relative inertness and tedium."

Writing in The Nation in 1946, critic James Agee stated: "There is no point in recommending The Dark Corner at all highly; but a great deal of intelligence and a fair amount of talent not only went into it, as they do into most movies, but manage—as they do in few—to remain visible. This, I thought, kept the show alive and fairly interesting."

Leslie Halliwell wrote: "Moody, brutish, well-made thriller with a plot put together from bits and pieces of older, better movies ... " Leonard Maltin gave the film three of four stars: "Top-notch mystery ... Well-acted, exciting film noir." Writing in The BFI Companion to Crime, Tim Pulleine praised the film's "effective casting" and "narrative momentum," and called it "an ingeniously developed treatment of the 'double-jeopardy' premise."

The Dark Corner has a score of 100% at Rotten Tomatoes, indicating overall critical praise. AllMovie rates it three out of five stars and calls it "a grade-A example of 'film noir.'"

=== Box office ===
The film earned $1 million at the box office, less than its $1.2 million cost of production.

== Legacy ==
The Dark Corner was overshadowed by Hathaway's other semidocumentary and noir films such as Kiss of Death and The House on 92nd Street, but it has gained a reputation as an underappreciated classic of the film noir genre.

Bradford Galt's comment, "There goes my last lead. I'm all dead inside. I'm backed up in a dark corner, and I don't know who's hitting me," has been described as a "prime example of existential anguish" that typifies film noir.
