= Sand (1949 film) =

1949 film by Louis King

- Directed by: Louis King
- Screenplay by: Martin Berkeley; Jerome Cady
- Based on: Will James (from the novel)
- Produced by: Robert Bassler
- Starring: Mark Stevens; Coleen Gray
- Cinematography: Charles G. Clarke
- Edited by: Nick DeMaggio
- Music by: Daniele Amfitheatrof
- Color process: Technicolor
- Production company: 20th Century Fox
- Distributed by: 20th Century Fox
- Release date: June 28, 1949 (Denver)
- Running time: 78 minutes
- Country: United States
- Language: English
- Box office: $1.5 million (US rentals)

Sand is a 1949 American Western film directed by Louis King and starring Mark Stevens and Coleen Gray. It was nominated at the 22nd Academy Awards for Best Cinematography (color), which Charles G. Clarke was nominated for.

== Plot ==
Based on the 1932 novel of the same name, Jeff Keane's expensive horse show escapes and runs loose in the Colorado wilderness.

== Cast ==
- Mark Stevens as Jeff Keane
- Coleen Gray as Joan Hartley
- Rory Calhoun as Chick Palmer
- Charley Grapewin as Doug
- Robert Patten as Boyd (as Bob Patten)

== Release ==
Sand had its premiere in Denver, Colorado on June 28, 1949. It opened in 300 theaters around Independence Day in the Western United States including Kansas City, Omaha, Milwaukee, San Francisco and Seattle as well as Philadelphia and Detroit.

== See also ==
- List of films about horses
