= Johnny Ringo (TV series) =

American TV Western series (1959–1960)

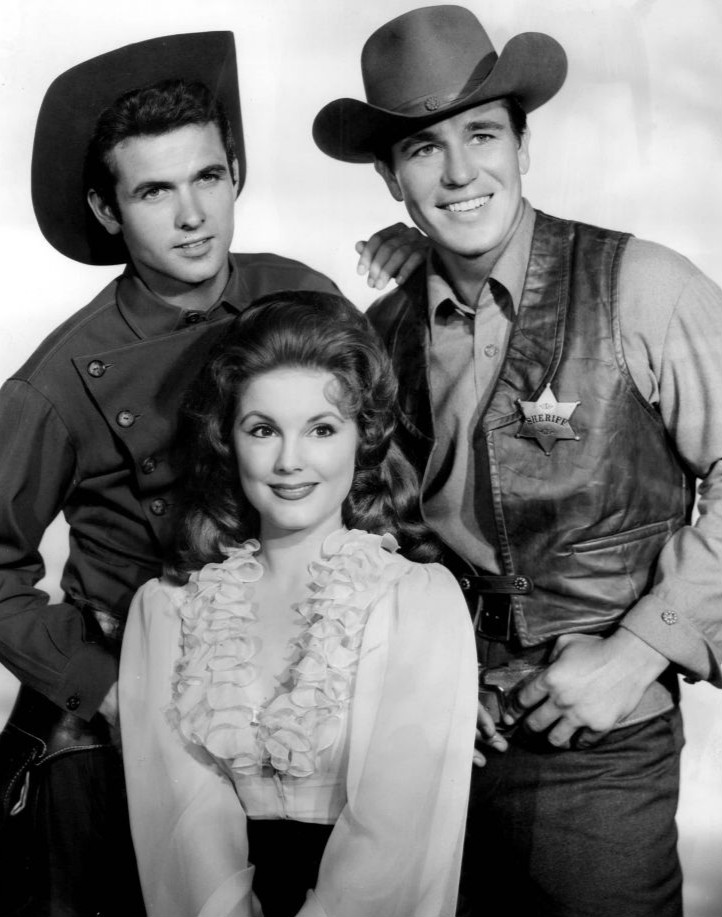
- Mark Goddard as Cully, Don Durant as Johnny Ringo and Karen Sharpe as Laura Thomas (1959)
- Genre: Western
- Created by: Aaron Spelling
- Written by: Aaron Spelling
- Directed by: Dick Moder; John English; David Lowell Rich
- Starring: Don Durant; Mark Goddard; Karen Sharpe; Terence De Marney
- Composers: Rudy Schrager; Herschel Burke Gilbert
- Country of origin: United States
- Original language: English
- No. of seasons: 1
- No. of episodes: 38

Production
- Camera setup: Multi-camera Single-camera
- Running time: 25 mins.
- Production company: Four Star Productions

Original release
- Network: CBS
- Release: October 1, 1959 – June 30, 1960

Johnny Ringo is an American Western television series starring Don Durant that aired on CBS from October 1, 1959, until September 29, 1960. It is loosely based on the life of notorious gunfighter and outlaw Johnny Ringo, also known as John Peters Ringo or John B. Ringgold, who tangled with Wyatt Earp, Doc Holliday, and Buckskin Franklyn Leslie. "There really was a gunfighter-turned-lawman named Johnny Ringo in the 1880s, though it is doubtful that his exploits resembled those portrayed in this series."

== Synopsis ==
Ringo puts aside his gunfighting ways to become the 27-year-old sheriff of fictional Velardi in the Arizona Territory. Ringo has two deputies: William Charles Jr., or Cully (Mark Goddard), and Case Thomas (Terence De Marney), who is also a storekeeper and formerly the town drunk. Case is killed in a robbery in the episode "Border Town", which aired on March 17, 1960. Case's daughter, Laura Thomas (Karen Sharpe), is Ringo's girlfriend in the series. Michael Hinn appeared in nine episodes as George Haig.

In the episode "The Posse", Richard Devon plays Jessie Mead, a former friend of Ringo who storms into town asking that he be jailed for protection from a pursuing posse, which Mead claims is really a lynch mob. Mead breaks a storefront glass to compel Ringo to arrest him. Actually, Mead has conspired with three others to rob the bank while the townspeople are diverted from their regular activities to pressure Ringo into turning Mead over to "the posse", the members of which are the other criminals. Ringo urges caution, but the irate townspeople want to take the matter into their own hands.

== Cast ==
=== Main cast ===
- Don Durant as Johnny Ringo
- Mark Goddard as Cully
- Karen Sharpe as Laura Thomas
- Terence De Marney as Case Thomas

=== Recurring cast ===
- Michael Hinn as George Haig
- Jess Kirkpatrick as Bartender

== Production ==
Johnny Ringo was broadcast on Thursdays from 8:30 to 9 p.m. Eastern Time. Durant composed and sang the theme.

=== Development ===
Aaron Spelling produced the show for Four Star Television. Spelling created Johnny Ringo at the specific request of Dick Powell as a role for Durant. It was filmed at CBS Studio Center. The pilot episode was shot as part of Dick Powell's Zane Grey Theatre, titled "Man Alone", and featured Thomas Mitchell as Case Thomas. A second pilot was shot with Terence de Marney in the role.

=== Syndication as The Westerners ===
For syndicated reruns, the show was combined with three other Western series from the same company, Black Saddle starring Peter Breck, Law of the Plainsman starring Michael Ansara, and Sam Peckinpah's critically acclaimed creation, The Westerner starring Brian Keith, under the umbrella title The Westerners, with additional hosting segments featuring Keenan Wynn.

== Episodes ==
No.	Title	Directed by	Written by	Original release date
1	"The Arrival"	Howard W. Koch	Aaron Spelling	October 1, 1959
2	"Cully"	Howard W. Koch	Stephen Lord	October 8, 1959
3	"The Accused"	Lamont Johnson	Frederick Louis Fox	October 15, 1959
4	"A Killing for Cully"	Howard W. Koch	David Chandler	October 22, 1959
5	"The Hunters"	Howard W. Koch	Barney Slater	October 29, 1959
6	"The Posse"	John English	Robert Sherman	November 5, 1959
7	"Ghost Coach"	John English	Richard Levinson & William Link	November 12, 1959
8	"Dead Wait"	William D. Faralla	John Falvo	November 19, 1959
9	"The Rain Man"	Dick Moder	Richard Levinson & William Link	November 26, 1959
10	"The Cat"	Frank Baur	T : Stephen Lord; S/T : Richard Newman	December 3, 1959
11	"Love Affair"	Don Taylor	Stephen Lord	December 17, 1959
12	"Kid with a Gun"	Paul Henreid	T. E. Brooks	December 24, 1959
13	"Bound Boy"	Tom Gries	Tom Gries	December 31, 1959
14	"East Is East"	Laurence Stewart	Wilton Schiller	January 7, 1960
15	"The Poster Incident"	Dick Moder	P. K. Palmer	January 14, 1960
16	"Die Twice"	Dick Moder	Frederick Louis Fox	January 20, 1960
17	"Four Came Quietly"	R. G. Springsteen	Frederick Louis Fox	January 28, 1960
18	"The Liars"	Laurence Stewart	Barney Slater	February 4, 1960
19	"Mrs. Ringo"	Laurence Stewart	T : Stephen Lord; S/T : Peggy Witt	February 11, 1960
20	"The Assassins"	David Lowell Rich	Teddi Sherman	February 18, 1960
21	"The Reno Brothers"	Dick Moder	S : Stephen Lord & Aaron Spelling; T : John Falvo	February 25, 1960
22	"The Raffertys"	Paul Henreid	S : Martin Berkeley; T : David Chandler	March 3, 1960
Marshal Adam Polk is played by Thomas B. Henry
23	"Uncertain Vengeance"	Laurence Stewart	John Falvo & Dan Spelling	March 10, 1960
24	"Border Town"	Don Taylor	Richard Levinson & William Link	March 17, 1960
25	"The Gunslinger"	Robert M. Leeds	Stephen Lord	March 24, 1960
26	"The Vindicator"	William D. Faralla	John Marsh	March 31, 1960
27	"Black Harvest"	Dick Moder	John Falvo	April 7, 1960
28	"Judgement Day"	Dick Moder	Frederick Louis Fox	April 14, 1960
29	"The Killing Bug"	Tom Gries	Tom Gries	April 28, 1960
30	"Soft Cargo"	Dick Moder	Barney Slater	May 5, 1960
31	"Single Debt"	Arthur Hilton	Tony Habeeb	May 12, 1960
32	"The Stranger"	Dick Moder	James Hurley	May 19, 1960
33	"The Derelict"	David Lowell Rich	John Marsh	May 26, 1960
34	"Shoot the Moon"	Dick Moder	Charles A. Wallace	June 2, 1960
35	"Killer, Choose a Card"	Don Taylor	Patricia Jenkins	June 9, 1960
36	"Coffin Sam"	Dick Moder	Dan Spelling	June 16, 1960
37	"Lobo Lawman"	Dick Moder	Charles A. Wallace	June 23, 1960
38	"Cave-In"	William D. Faralla	John Marsh	June 30, 1960

== Reception ==
Johnny Ringo scored good ratings, but was dropped at the request of a sponsor, Johnson Wax Company. After the cancellation of Johnny Ringo, Mark Goddard went on to co-star as Det. Sgt. Chris Ballard in still another Four Star Productions TV series, The Detectives Starring Robert Taylor on ABC, replacing Lee Farr. He later went on to the CBS-TV series, Lost in Space.
