= Cry Vengeance =

1954 film by Mark Stevens

- Theatrical release poster
- Directed by: Mark Stevens
- Screenplay by: Warren Douglas; George Bricker
- Produced by: Lindsley Parsons; John H. Burrows
- Starring: Mark Stevens; Joan Vohs; Martha Hyer
- Cinematography: William A. Sickner
- Edited by: Elmo Veron
- Music by: Paul Dunlap
- Production company: Lindsley Parsons Productions
- Distributed by: Allied Artists Pictures
- Release date: November 21, 1954 (United States)
- Running time: 83 minutes
- Country: United States
- Language: English

Cry Vengeance is a 1954 American film noir crime film directed by and starring Mark Stevens. The cast also includes Joan Vohs and Martha Hyer. It was produced by Lindsley Parsons and distributed by Allied Artists.

== Plot ==
San Francisco ex-cop Vic Barron's family has died in a car bombing and he has been disfigured, framed and imprisoned when he crossed the wrong mobsters. After his release, he wants revenge on gangster Tino Morelli, whom he considers responsible.

Morelli is hiding out in Ketchikan, Alaska. After his arrival there, Vic finds Morelli and Morelli's charming little daughter. With the help of tavern owner Peggy Harding, Barron discovers that Morelli did not order the bombing and that the true murderer was a hitman named Roxey. Harding also takes Barron on scenic tours of Alaska, hoping to calm his rage and make him realize that life is still worth living.

Barron intends to kidnap Morelli's young daughter Marie as "leverage", but the little girl is so friendly toward him and blind to his disfigurement that he cannot go through with it. Morelli's death also cools his initial anger.

Roxey, who has followed Barron, murders Morelli, but is wounded by Barron in a shootout, then falls from atop a dam. After saying farewell to Peggy and to Morelli's orphaned daughter, Barron travels back to San Francisco, but with a hint that he might return.

== Cast ==
- Mark Stevens as Vic Barron
- Martha Hyer as Peggy Harding
- Skip Homeier as Roxey
- Joan Vohs as Lily Arnold
- Douglas Kennedy as Tino Morelli
- Cheryl Callaway as Marie Morelli
- Mort Mills as Johnny Blue-eyes
- Warren Douglas as Mike Walters
- Lewis Martin as Nick Buda
- Don Haggerty as Lt. Pat Ryan
- John Doucette as Red Miller
- Dorothy Kennedy as Emily Miller
- Richard Deacon as San Francisco bartender (uncredited)
- Edward Clark as Pawnbroker (uncredited)
