= Between Midnight and Dawn =

1950 film by Gordon Douglas

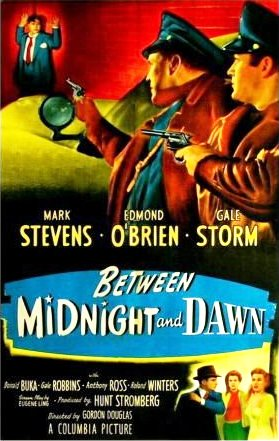
- Theatrical release poster
- Directed by: Gordon Douglas
- Screenplay by: Eugene Ling
- Story by: Gerald Drayson Adams; Leo Katcher
- Produced by: Hunt Stromberg
- Starring: Mark Stevens; Edmond O'Brien; Gale Storm
- Cinematography: George E. Diskant
- Edited by: Gene Havlick
- Music by: George Duning
- Production company: Columbia Pictures
- Distributed by: Columbia Pictures
- Release date: October 1, 1950 (New York)
- Running time: 89 minutes
- Country: United States
- Language: English

Between Midnight and Dawn is a 1950 American film noir crime film directed by Gordon Douglas and starring Mark Stevens, Edmond O'Brien and Gale Storm. It is notable as one of the earliest Hollywood police films to focus on beat cops rather than detectives and other high-ranking officers.

== Plot ==
Childhood friends Rocky Barnes and Dan Purvis are Los Angeles prowl-car cops on night duty. Barnes is easygoing while Purvis is a cynic who disdains all lawbreakers. Both men are attracted to radio communicator Kate Mallory, but she is reluctant to become involved with policemen, her cop father having been killed in the line of duty. After several pushes from her mother, she eventually falls for Barnes.

Barnes and Purvis arrest murderous racketeer Ritchie Garris, who then swears vengeance against them. Garris escapes from prison and shoots Barnes in the face several times. After months of hiding from the police, Garris finally believes that it is safe to collect his girlfriend Terry Romaine and then flee to Mexico. The police, who have been surveilling Romaine's apartment, quickly approach Garris. In a desperate attempt for his freedom, he takes a neighbor girl hostage. Purvis launches a daring solo raid, but while his smoke bomb separates the hostage from Garris, it also disorients Purvis, allowing Garris to gain the upper hand. At the last minute, Romaine jumps in front of Garris's bullet, saving Purvis' life and forcing him to rethink his cynicism.

== Cast ==
- Mark Stevens as Rocky Barnes
- Edmond O'Brien as Daniel Purvis
- Gale Storm as Katherine Mallory
- Donald Buka as Ritchie Garris
- Gale Robbins as Terry Romaine
- Anthony Ross as Lt. Masterson
- Roland Winters as Leo Cusick
- Tito Vuolo as Romano
- Grazia Narciso as Mrs. Romano
- Madge Blake as Mrs. Mallory
- Lora Lee Michel as Kathy

== Reception ==
In a contemporary review for The New York Times, critic Bosley Crowther wrote: "If you want to know how the policemen who ride the prowl cars spend their time—if not in actuality, at least in a Hollywood film—then sit yourself down before a picture entitled 'Between Midnight and Dawn' ... By this explosive exhibition, you may not be literally informed, but you'll certainly be fairly treated to a fast cops-and-robbers show. Let us advise you, however, that the general disposition of the cops and the brand of romance in this picture is on a studiously juvenile plane."

Reviewer Marjory Adams of The Boston Globe wrote: "Personally, I don't imagine that there are many such sensational stories in our police annals as we see in Hollywood films, but the preference of many film-goers for this kind of cinema is unquestioned. No realism or authenticity, but a lot of shooting and the dirty villain behind bars or bleeding out his final moments with the police in triumph at last."

Writing in the San Francisco Examiner, critic Barbara East mentioned that the film "... is a good lesson for the uninitiated in the operation of the police department of a metropolitan city and it is also a better than average cops and robbers yarn" and concluded: "'Between Midnight and Dawn' isn't the best picture in the world but it is a good one and it gives the policeman, whose job is often minimized and ridiculed, his fair share of the glory spotlight."
