= Estelle Conde =

American television writer

- Born: Estelle Schrott; January 7, 1904; New York City, New York, USA
- Died: April 30, 1973 (aged 69); Los Angeles, California, USA
- Occupations: Television writer, motion picture publicist, novelist

Estelle Schrott Conde (January 7, 1904–April 30, 1973) was an American television writer, motion picture publicist and story supervisor, and novelist.

== Early life and career ==
Born Estelle Schrott in New York City on January 7, 1904, Conde was the eldest of two children born to Mr. and Mrs. Jacob Schrott of Freehold, New Jersey.

During the 1930s, Schrott served as a publicist for Warner Brothers, Gaumont-British, and Walter Wanger.

In 1941, Schrott's completion of a new novel, entitled High Noon, dubbed "a story about Americans in South America", was reported by Boxoffice Given the preceding description, coupled with the fact that no Schrott work by that name was ever published, it seems likely that High Noon was simply the working title of what would ultimately emerge in February 1944 as Heaven Is For the Angels. In 1946, The Film Daily reported that Conde had been "notified that negotiations are now under way for the sale of her novel, 'Heaven is for the Angels,' to an independent Coast producer". The unnamed producer was never identified, and the screen adaptation evidently never materialized.

In December 1959, the Hollywood Citizen-News named nine writers signed to script upcoming episodes of the series, The Millioanaire, with the group's final two members dubbed "the team of Jan Winters and Estelle Conde". The following April, their episode aired, starring Whitney Blake as "Millionaire Nancy Cortez", a recipient whose peculiar dilemma is her fiance's seemingly unshakeable attachment to bullfighting. The episode co-stars Gustavo Rojo. Next, Conde collaborated with veteran story analyst Giulio Anfuso on the 1960 season opener of Dick Powell's Zane Grey Theatre, starring Burl Ives as "The Ox", a newly released convict intent on clearing his name. Playing widely divergent roles in this scenario are costars Whit Bissell, Edward Platt, and Jacklyn O'Donnell.

About one month prior to the Powell season opener, Conde participated in another opening of sorts, appearing as herself in a panel discussion on the topic of "American husbands' alongside Doctors Leonard Kurland and Paul Popenoe, airing on the newly all-talk radio station, KABC (AM).

== Personal life and death ==
By December 1943, Schrott had become Mrs. Estelle Schrott Conde, although she did not adopt the name professionally until December 1959.

Throughout their lives, Conde and her brother appear to remained exceptionally close, both personally and professionally. For at least the five-year period—1935-1940—immediately preceding the South and Central American sojourns which ultimately produced both one published novel and one mentioned-in-passing marriage, the siblings resided together in Brooklyn (as documented by the 1940 U.S. Census form which lists her occupation as "motion picture publicist" and his as "motion picture clerk"). Moreover, press accounts eventually revealed that Eugene Schrott had, in large part, continued to mirror his sister's career path, becoming a press spokesperson for CBS and, in particular, Ed Sullivan.

Conde died of cancer in Hollywood on April 30, 1973, at age 69, survived by her brother Eugene, and cousin, Edward Marks. Her remains are interred at Mount Sinai Hollywood Hills.

Scarcely one month after Conde's death, the trade publication Broadcasting reported the death—at age 61, cause undisclosed—of recently retired 23-year CBS press representative, Eugene Schrott, survived by his wife, daughter and son.

== Selected filmography ==
- The Millionaire
  - "Millionaire Nancy Cortez" (1960) – with Jan Winters; starring Whitney Blake and Gustavo Rojo
- Dick Powell's Zane Grey Theatre
  - "The Ox" (1960) – with Guillio Anfuso; starring Burl Ives and Whit Bissell
- Lassie
  - Unknown episode (1961)
