= Karen Sharpe =

American film and television actress (born 1934)

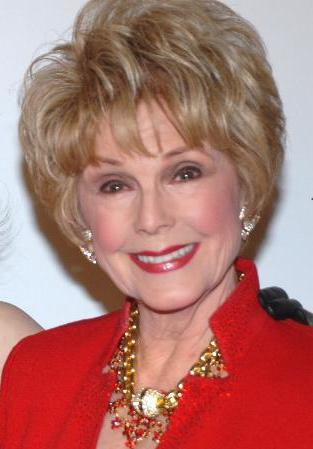
- Sharpe in 2011
- Born: Karen Kay Sharpe; September 20, 1934 (age 92); San Antonio, Texas, U.S.
- Occupations: Film and television actress
- Years active: 1952–2021
- Spouses: Charles Stevens Marshall (m. 1957; div. 1962) Stanley Kramer (m. 1966; died 2001)
- Children: 2

Karen Kay Sharpe (born September 20, 1934) is an American film and television actress. She is known for playing Laura Thomas in the American western television series Johnny Ringo.

== Life and career ==
Sharpe was born in San Antonio, Texas, the daughter of Kirk Howard Sharpe, an oilman, and Dorothy Shrout. She was an ice skater in Hollywood, California, and was a student at Hollywood Professional School. She studied dancing with choreographer Adolph Bolm in Los Angeles, California.

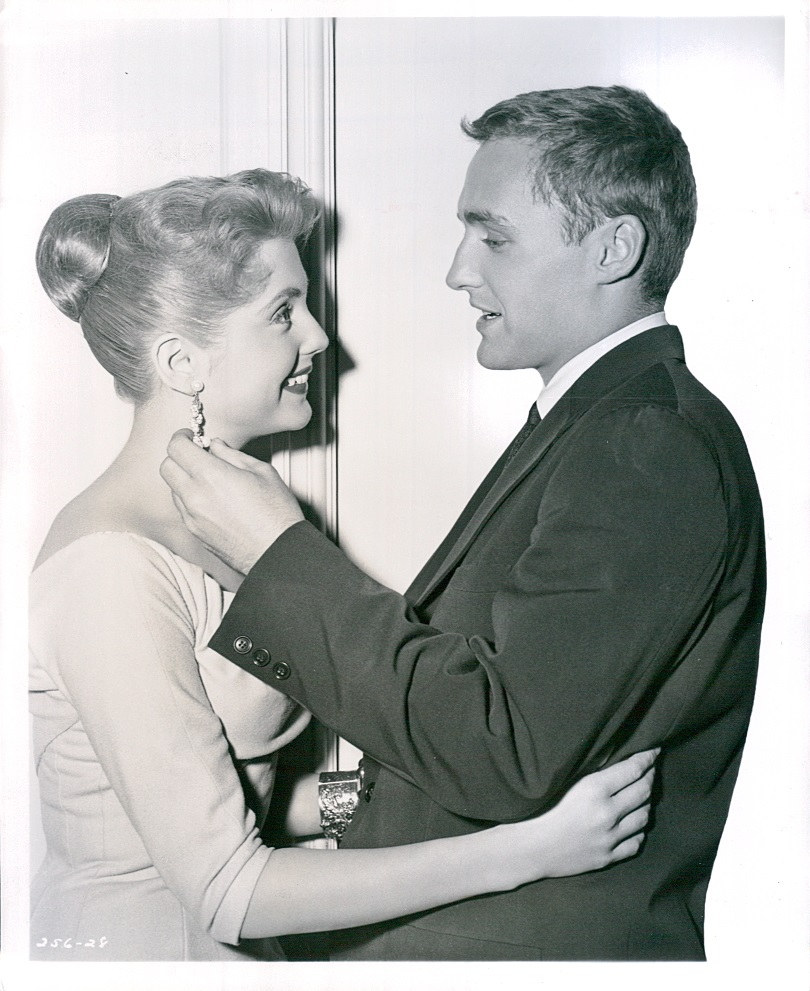
Sharpe (left) with Dennis Hopper in Conflict, 1957

Sharpe had unsuccessful screen tests while she worked as a model. After she was discovered by a talent scout, she began her screen career in 1952, starring as Jane Harris in the film Army Bound, starring along with Stanley Clements and Steve Brodie. In the same year, she appeared in the films The Sniper, Holiday for Sinners, Bomba and the Jungle Girl and Strange Fascination, and made her television debut in the ABC anthology television series Rebound. In 1955, she won a Golden Globe Award in the category New Star of the Year – Actress for her performance as Nell Buck in the 1954 film The High and the Mighty, along with actresses Shirley MacLaine and Kim Novak.

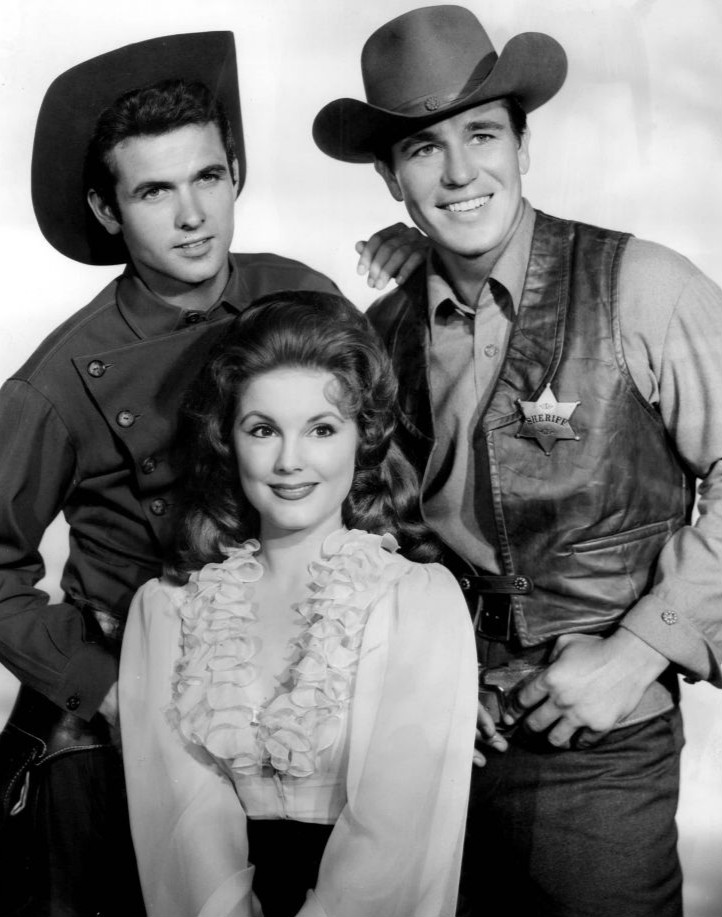
Sharpe (center) with Mark Goddard and Don Durant in Johnny Ringo, 1959

Later in her career, in 1959, Sharpe starred as Laura Thomas in the CBS western television series Johnny Ringo, starring along with Don Durant, Mark Goddard and Terence De Marney. After the series ended in 1960, she guest-starred in numerous television programs, including Gunsmoke, Bonanza, Death Valley Days, Perry Mason, The Wild Wild West, The Texan, Rawhide, Gomer Pyle - U.S.M.C., Trackdown, Mickey Spillane's Mike Hammer, 77 Sunset Strip, The Man from U.N.C.L.E., The Millionaire and I Dream of Jeannie. She also appeared in films such as Man with the Gun (as Stella Atkins), Mexican Manhunt (as Linda Morgan), Valley of Mystery, Tarawa Beachhead, The High and the Mighty and The Disorderly Orderly.

Sharpe retired from acting in 2021, last appearing in the film Fate's Shadow: The Whole Story.

== Personal life ==
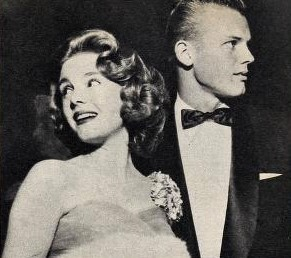
Sharpe (left) with Tab Hunter in 1954

In 1957, Sharpe married Chester Stevens Marshall, an actor. She later filed for divorce on the grounds that he had physically abused her. According to the Odessa American, due to beatings at the hands of Marshall, her rib cage was contused and her head was smashed against a brick wall. The divorce became final on September 18, 1962. Marshall was murdered at his home in 1974.

In the early 1960s, Sharpe inherited her father's business, and spent several years running it in Texas before selling up and returning to California.

On September 1, 1966, Sharpe married Stanley Kramer, a film director and producer. They married in Beverly Hills, California. They had two children. Kramer died in 2001 in Los Angeles, California.

In 2022, Sharpe revealed that she was sexually assaulted and harassed by comic actor Jerry Lewis on the set of the 1964 film The Disorderly Orderly. She stated that Lewis had sent for Sharpe to come to his office, whereupon he grabbed and fondled her, then unzipped his pants, which she stated that "I was dumbstruck." She recalls his advances, which enraged Sharpe so much that was the last time she ever worked with him. Actress Hope Holiday shared that she was similarly sexually assaulted by Lewis.
