= Mark Goddard =

American actor (1936–2023)

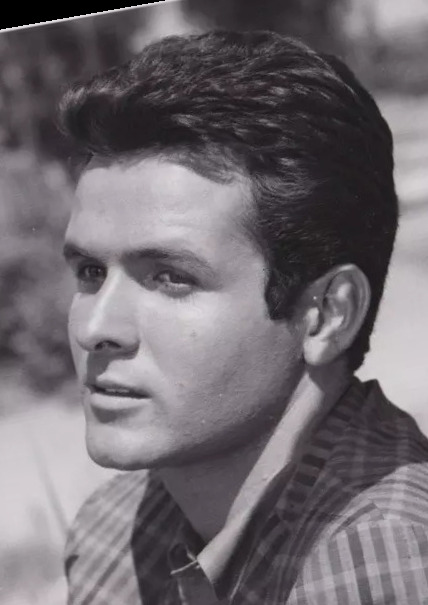
- Goddard in 1961
- Born: Charles Harvey Goddard; July 24, 1936; Lowell, Massachusetts, U.S.
- Died: October 10, 2023 (aged 87); Hingham, Massachusetts, U.S.
- Resting place: Mayflower Cemetery, Duxbury, Massachusetts, U.S.
- Education: College of the Holy Cross; American Academy of Dramatic Arts
- Occupation: Actor
- Years active: 1959–2023
- Spouses: Marcia Rogers (m. 1960; div. 1968) Susan Anspach (m. 1970; div. 1978) Evelyn Pezzulich (m. 1990)
- Children: 5

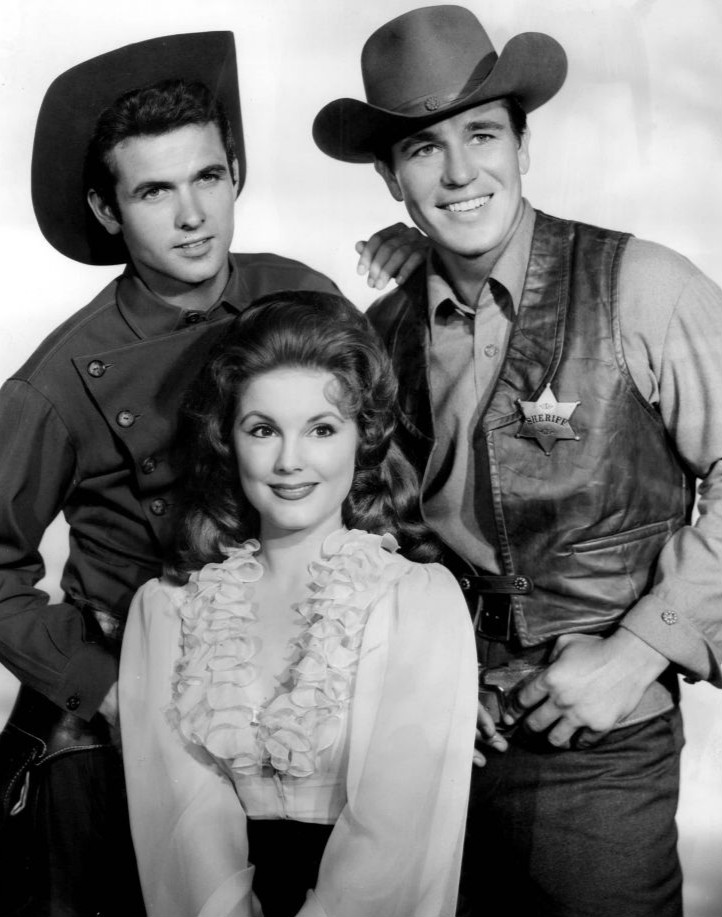
Mark Goddard (left), Karen Sharpe, and Don Durant on TV's Johnny Ringo (1959)

Mark Goddard (born Charles Harvey Goddard; July 24, 1936 – October 10, 2023) was an American actor who starred in a number of television programs. He is probably best known for portraying Major Don West in the CBS series Lost in Space (1965–1968). He also played Detective Sgt. Chris Ballard, in The Detectives, starring Robert Taylor.

== Early life ==
Charles Harvey Goddard was born in Lowell, Massachusetts, on July 24, 1936. The youngest of five children, he grew up in Scituate. He was raised Roman Catholic and described himself as "almost a good Catholic".

Goddard led both his high school baseball and basketball teams to the state championship finals. Goddard dreamed of becoming a basketball player but eventually turned to acting. He originally attended the College of the Holy Cross after high school but transferred and studied at the American Academy of Dramatic Arts in New York City. After two years, he moved to Los Angeles.

== Career ==
In 1959, after just three weeks in Hollywood, he landed a role in the CBS Four Star Television series Johnny Ringo, having played the character of Cully, the deputy to Don Durant's character of Ringo. At this time, he changed his name to Mark Goddard at the suggestion of his friend and mentor Chuck Connors of The Rifleman. Goddard appeared as Norman Tabor in the 1960 episode "Surprise Party" of the CBS anthology series The DuPont Show with June Allyson. He was cast as Sheldon Hollingsworth in the 1960 episode "To See the Elephant" of the ABC Western series The Rebel, starring Nick Adams. He played Tod Rowland in the 1960 episode "The Mormons" on Dick Powell's Zane Grey Theatre. Goddard also appeared in The Rifleman as Marty Blair in 1962 in the episode “Mark’s Rifle”. The Detectives, another production of Four Star Television, was a hit series which ran on ABC and NBC from 1958 to 1961. Goddard was signed for a role lasting three years (64 episodes). Goddard appeared as Roy Mooney on the Perry Mason 1963 episode "The Case of the Potted Planter" and in the 1965 episode "The Case of the Frustrated Folk Singer" as Lester Crawford. In 1964, Goddard appeared as Richard on The Virginian in the episode titled "The Secret of Brynmar Hall". That same year he guest starred as a wild killer named “Boyd” in the episode “Journey For Three” on the TV Western series Gunsmoke (S9E36). Goddard's next role was Major Don West on Lost in Space (1965–1968).

=== Later acting career ===
Goddard guest-starred on three ABC series, The Fugitive, The Mod Squad, and The Fall Guy and for a while, moonlighted as a Hollywood agent. In 1976, he starred as politician Edward Fleming in the film Blue Sunshine. In 1970, Goddard co-starred with Kent McCord and Martin Milner in an episode of Adam-12, in which he plays a friend of Pete Malloy (Milner), who is killed in the line of duty. The episode was titled "Elegy for a Pig" (so titled and announced by Jack Webb himself). Goddard also played Ellie May's beau on the Beverly Hillbillies episode "The Critter Doctor" (1964). He played a supporting role in a 1974 episode ("Dark Legacy") of CBS's Barnaby Jones., and portrayed an attorney in a first season episode of NBC's Quincy, M.E.

In 1978, Goddard starred with Liza Minnelli on Broadway in the musical The Act. In 1979, he was in the disco film Roller Boogie featuring Linda Blair and Jim Bray. Goddard appeared as Ted Clayton on One Life to Live in 1981, and Lt. Paul Reed on The Doctors in 1982. Later, he starred as Derek Barrington on General Hospital from 1984 to 1986. He made a cameo appearance in the 1998 reboot film Lost in Space as the general in charge of the Jupiter Mission and superior officer to his former character Major Don West.

== Personal life and death ==
Goddard's first marriage was to Marcia Rogers in 1960, which lasted until their divorce in 1968; the couple had two children. Goddard and Rogers were amongst the last people to see Karyn Kupcinet, hosting a dinner on the night of November 27, 1963. Goddard and Rogers found her dead body on November 30 after she failed to call them as promised. He and his second wife, actress Susan Anspach, were married from 1970 to 1978, and had two children together, one biological and one adopted by Goddard. Goddard finished college 30 years after beginning his studies and received his master's degree in education from Bridgewater State College.

He met his third wife, English professor Evelyn Pezzulich, while at Bridgewater, and they married in 1990. The couple had one child, a son. From 1991 through at least 2009, Goddard served as a special education teacher at the F.L. Chamberlain School in Middleboro, Massachusetts, where he taught an acting class. In 2009, he released an autobiographical memoir, To Space and Back: A Memoir.

Goddard died from pulmonary fibrosis in Hingham, Massachusetts, on October 10, 2023, at the age of 87.
