= From This Day Forward =

1946 film by John Berry

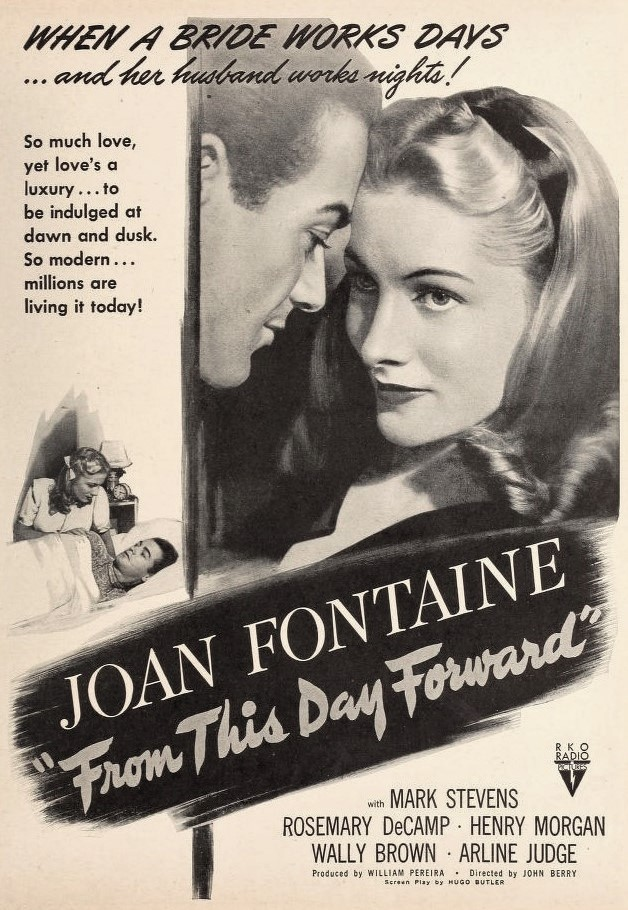
- Directed by: John Berry
- Written by: Garson Kanin (adaptation); Hugo Butler (screenplay); Clifford Odets (uncredited)
- Produced by: Jack J. Gross (executive producer); William Pereira (producer)
- Starring: Joan Fontaine; Mark Stevens; Rosemary DeCamp; Harry Morgan
- Cinematography: George Barnes
- Edited by: Frank Doyle
- Music by: Leigh Harline
- Production company: RKO Radio Pictures
- Distributed by: RKO Radio Pictures
- Release dates: March 27, 1946 (Premiere-San Francisco); April 19, 1946 (U.S.)
- Running time: 95 minutes
- Country: United States
- Language: English
- Budget: $650,000

From This Day Forward is a 1946 American drama film directed by John Berry and starring Joan Fontaine, Mark Stevens and Rosemary DeCamp. It was produced and distributed by RKO Pictures.

== Plot ==
Army sergeant Bill Cummings (Mark Stevens) is about to be discharged after service in World War II. He was a blue collar worker in civilian life and is seeking employment. As he fills out forms and speaks to personnel at the United States Employment Service, he thinks back on the life events that brought him to this point.

Flashbacks show him at various times in his prewar life. He is shown meeting and marrying his wife Susan (Joan Fontaine) in 1938. Other flashbacks describe their hardscrabble life in a poor neighborhood of New York City during the Great Depression. He and various relatives are shown as frequently unemployed and having difficulty making a living.

He and Susan's financial ups and downs are depicted, as are the humiliation of being supported by Susan's bookstore clerking job, and unfairly being prosecuted as a pornographer.

At the conclusion of the film, he is shown being referred to a badly needed job interview, and we learn that Susan is pregnant.

== Cast ==
- Joan Fontaine as Susan Cummings
- Mark Stevens as Bill Cummings
- Rosemary DeCamp as Martha Beesley
- Harry Morgan as Hank Beesley
- Wally Brown as Jake Beesley
- Arline Judge as Margie Beesley
- Renny McEvoy as Charlie Beesley
- Bobby Driscoll as Timmy Beesley
- Mary Treen as Alice Beesley
- Queenie Smith as Mrs. Beesley
- Doreen McCann as Barbara Beesley
- Erskine Sanford as Mr. Higgler
- Theodore Newton as Mr. Brewer
- Charles Wagenheim as Hoffman
- unbilled players include Ellen Corby, Ralph Dunn, Blake Edwards, Milton Kibbee, Tommy Noonan and Moroni Olsen

== Political context ==
Called "the most expressively optimistic film of the postwar Left" and "literally working-class cinema", the screenplay was adapted from the 1936 novel "All Brides are Beautiful" by working-class immigrant novelist Thomas Bell. Director Berry and screenwriter Hugo Butler would both be caught in the Hollywood blacklist, and the uncredited writer Odets appeared as a HUAC friendly witness.

== Reception ==
The New York Times reviewer called the film "a plotless succession of episodes," and said "there may be some purpose in all this but we couldn't quite make it out—unless it is simply to demonstrate that unemployment is a very bad thing." The critic said that Fontaine's performance as a Bronx housewife was unconvincing.

Variety said the flashbacks make "it sometimes difficult to follow as a whole, but there can be no quarrel with the merit of presentation and acting of the individual sequences."

A Cincinnati Enquirer reviewer praised the performances and the film's "extraordinarily realistic touches," though he noted a "somewhat involved story-telling method."

Time Out Film Guide said that "such strands as post-war optimism, the impact of neo-realism, the socialist convictions of director and chief writer (Butler), both blacklist-bound, can easily be picked out. But as ever when Hollywood tried to engage with everyday realities, the trade off came in glamourisation - syrupy music, Fontaine (as Stevens' wife) never looking less than a film star, and an idea of poverty that must have irritated many audiences on home ground, never mind in Europe."

=== Reception ===
The film made a profit of $362,000.

== Radio adaptation ==
From This Day Forward was presented on Lux Radio Theatre October 28, 1946. Fontaine and Stevens reprised their roles in the adaptation.
