= Please Believe Me =

1950 film by Norman Taurog

- Theatrical poster
- Directed by: Norman Taurog
- Written by: Nathaniel Curtis
- Produced by: Val Lewton
- Starring: Deborah Kerr; Robert Walker; Mark Stevens; Peter Lawford
- Cinematography: Robert H. Planck
- Edited by: Ferris Webster
- Music by: Hans J. Salter
- Distributed by: Metro-Goldwyn-Mayer
- Release dates: April 14, 1950 (Richmond, Virginia); May 3, 1950 (Los Angeles); June 11, 1950 (New York)
- Running time: 87 minutes
- Country: United States
- Language: English
- Budget: $1,055,000
- Box office: $769,000

Please Believe Me is a 1950 American romantic comedy film directed by Norman Taurog and starring Deborah Kerr, Robert Walker, Mark Stevens and Peter Lawford.

== Plot ==
Alison Kirbe is a young London girl who has just learned that she has inherited a Texas ranch from an old soldier whom she had befriended during World War II. Mistakenly assuming that she is now the owner of a small empire, she crosses the Atlantic Ocean by ship. On her way, she meets Terence Keath, a fellow passenger heavily in debt to casino owner Lucky Reilly. To pay his debts, he attempts to marry rich and seduces Alison, whom he believes to be a wealthy heiress. Jeremy Taylor, a millionaire bachelor accompanied by his attorney Matthew Kinston, is also attracted to Alison.

Alison enjoys the attention that she is receiving from Terence, Jeremy and Matthew, but she rejects all three men. She feels most attracted to Matthew, but he mistakenly confronts her for being part of a scheme. Trying to hurt Matthew, she borrows money from Terence and buys an expensive present for Jeremy, while posing as a wealthy heiress. After arriving in the United States, Alison stays in New York for a week before traveling to Texas. Matthew tries to find more information on the ranch that she has inherited,

Matthew confronts Alison at a casino, where she is gambling with Terence and Jeremy. He soon apologizes and they kiss. Terence and Jeremy are shocked that she prefers a penniless attorney rather than them. The next day, Matthew learns that Alison's ranch is worthless and accuses her again of swindling Jeremy. Alison is angry at Matthew for accusing that her inheritance is the basis of a supposed scheme. That night, Alison learns about Terence's financial situation and tries to help him by offering Reilly to pay Terence's debts. However, Jeremy is prepared to pay the entire debt. The three men rush to the hotel, where they all propose marriage to Alison at the same time. Alison enthusiastically accepts Matthew's proposal and the other men soon move their attention to other women.

== Cast ==
- Deborah Kerr as Alison Kirbe
- Robert Walker as Terence Keath
- Mark Stevens as Matthew Kinston
- Peter Lawford as Jeremy Taylor
- James Whitmore as Vincent Maran
- J. Carrol Naish as 'Lucky' Reilly
- Spring Byington as Mrs. Milwright
- Drue Mallory as Beryl Robinson
- Carol Savage as Sylvia Rumley

== Production ==
The film was producer Val Lewton's only film for Metro-Goldwyn-Mayer. The film was devised as a vehicle for Deborah Kerr, but MGM was so satisfied with the script that it offered to raise the budget and replace Kerr with the more famous June Allyson. However, Lewton insisted on keeping Kerr.

On May 29, 1949, it was announced that Norman Taurog was set to direct the film. By that time, Kerr, Robert Walker and Peter Lawford were already cast. On June 14, 1949, Van Johnson was assigned the remaining male lead role, with shooting beginning one month later. Filming started with Johnson, but he was replaced by Mark Stevens in August 1949, as Johnson was reportedly needed for the lead in The Big Hangover. Stevens was borrowed from Twentieth Century-Fox.

== Reception ==
In a contemporary review for The New York Times, critic A. H. Weiler wrote: "In producing 'Please Believe Me,' the powers over at Metro must have been firmly convinced that the paying customers were anxious to view Deborah Kerr being pursued by three swains instead of one, the standard for the course. And, while the race is a mite more complex than the normal, the chuckles and amour distilled from this item ... could have been handled, it seems, by fewer and less noted operatives. For this romantic comedy is much ado about a tissue-thin tale, which, at its best, is only mildly diverting."

Critic John L. Scott of the Los Angeles Times called the film "a flippant comedy" and wrote: "You might call 'Please Believe Me' a comedy of errors. The players are young, the dialogue snappy and the situations verge on the ridiculous."

Reviewer William Brogdon of Variety wrote: "'Please Believe Me' is a wacky, mildly diverting comedy. Pacing is good and the story antics broad enough to account for a good round of chuckles."

According to MGM records, the film earned $577,000 in the U.S. and Canada and $192,000 overseas, resulting in a loss of $609,000.
