= Target Unknown =

1951 film by George Sherman

- Film poster
- Directed by: George Sherman
- Written by: Harold Medford
- Produced by: Aubrey Schenck
- Starring: Mark Stevens; Alex Nicol; Robert Douglas
- Cinematography: Maury Gertsman
- Edited by: Frank Gross
- Production company: Universal-International
- Distributed by: Universal-International
- Release dates: February 8, 1951 (Baltimore); March 4, 1951 (New York); March 27, 1951 (Los Angeles)
- Running time: 90 minutes
- Country: United States
- Language: English

Target Unknown (also known as Prisoner of War) is a 1951 American war film directed by George Sherman and starring Mark Stevens, Alex Nicol and Robert Douglas.

== Plot ==
In 1944 at a United States Army Air Forces air base in England, Capt. James M. "Steve" Stevens and his Martin B-26 Marauder bomber crew are assigned to a second bombing mission of the day. The men are exhausted physically and emotionally because the squadron has been repeatedly attacked by the enemy, possibly because someone has leaked information about the raids. The men have been warned that the Germans employ clever and insidious methods of extracting vital information from downed flyers.

Over their target, their bomber is attacked and bombardier Russ Johnson is killed. The rest of the crew, consisting of Steve, copilot Sgt. Frank Crawford and gunners Sgt. Alfred Mitchell and wounded Sgt. Ralph G. Phelps, are forced to parachute from the aircraft.

Steve and Al find each other on the ground but are captured by German soldiers and brought to a holding area to prepare them for a prisoner-of-war camp, where they are greeted by a Red Cross representative, but Steve notices that the form asks for excessive information and they both refuse to complete it.

German intelligence officer Col. Von Broeck discovers clues to their personalities, including Steve's intelligence and Al's loyalty to Steve. An American Nazi intelligence officer, Capt. Fred Reiner, visits prisoner Lt. Webster, and lying that he is an Allied sympathizer, tricks Webster into revealing that Ralph is from Atlanta.

A beautiful German nurse tends to Ralph, convincing him to complete the fake Red Cross form and divulge that two new crews were recently added to the squadron. With this information, Von Broeck surmises that the Americans are planning a large bombing raid, so he pretends that he will kill Steve unless Al divulges more information. As the raid is top secret, Al only reveals the type of bombs to be used. After the fake firing squad, Von Broeck deduces that the target must be one of four French cities. Reiner interrogates Frank, who has been beaten by the Gestapo and brought to the intelligence station, and quickly discovers that the target is the town of Cambrai, where the Axis gasoline supply is stored.

Al's cellmate overhears him bragging about what the Nazis have learned. When the crew is reunited and about to be shipped away by train, a plan is hatched. With Al and Frank on the train, Steve and Al jump from the train, but Frank is shot and killed by a guard.

Steve and Al walk all night and meet a French farmer whose daughter sneaks them into the nearest city, outfits them in peasant clothing and finds them a ride to a town near Cambrai that harbors French underground agents. Their driver Jean informs them that the gasoline supply at Cambrai has been moved to another location.

The Americans find an underground bar, where an agent slips Al fake identification papers, but a singer notifies the Germans. Al is arrested, but Steve escapes with the help of the agent and brought to the underground headquarters, where he finally convinces the leader to send a warning to the Allies. As night falls, Steve and the leader see the American squadron flying away from Cambrai and realize that the raid will succeed.

== Cast ==
- Mark Stevens as Capt. Jerome "Steve" Stevens
- Alex Nicol as Sgt. Alfred Mitchell
- Robert Douglas as Col. von Broeck
- Don Taylor as Lt. Frank Webster
- Gig Young as Capt. Reiner
- Joyce Holden as German nurse
- Suzanne Dalbert as Theresa
- Malú Gatica as French Entertainer
- James Best as Sgt. Ralph Phelps
- Richard Carlyle as Brooklyn
- Steven Geray as Jean
- Johnny Sands as Sgt. Frank Crawford
- Tony Christian as Gundlach
- James Young as Russ Johnson
- Ivan Triesault as German Officer
- Hugh Beaumont as American Commanding Officer

== Production ==
In 1950, Universal-International purchased the story featured in the 1944 U.S. Army docudrama training film Resisting Enemy Interrogation from screenwriter Harold Medford to be produced as a feature film with a working title of Prisoner of War. Although the film is based on Medford's screenplay, the story's climax was changed to involve the prisoners' escape.

Production began in late August 1950 and was completed by early October.

== Release ==
The film's world premiere was held in Baltimore, Maryland on February 8, 1951. Attending the premiere was Air Force pilot Robert J. Locke, the only American prisoner of war to have escaped after having been shot down and imprisoned behind North Korean enemy lines.

== Reception ==
In a contemporary review for The New York Times, critic A. H. Weiler wrote: "[T]he adventure ... is, despite its serious and brisk manner, more garrulous than dramatic. And its climactic chase, which has but a few moments of excitement, offers little that is novel."

Critic John L. Scott of the Los Angeles Times wrote: "Except for a too-melodramatic finish, which bears the typical Hollywood stamp, the film is genuinely interesting, informative and factual."
