= Big Town (American TV series) =

American TV dramatic series (1950–1956)

- Genre: Drama
- Written by: Alvin Boretz; Jack DeWitt; E. A. Dupont; Lawrence Kimble
- Directed by: David Lowell Rich; Charles F. Haas; George Waggner; Busby Berkeley; Mark Stevens
- Starring: Patrick McVey; Mary K. Wells; Julie Stevens (American actress, born 1916); Jane Nigh; Beverly Tyler; Mark Stevens; Trudy Wroe; Doe Avedon
- Theme music composer: Albert Glasser
- Country of origin: United States
- Original language: English
- No. of seasons: 6
- No. of episodes: 249

Production
- Running time: 22–26 minutes
- Production companies: Gross-Krasne, Incorporated; Mark Stevens Television Productions

Original release
- Network: CBS
- Release: October 5, 1950 – September 16, 1954
- Network: NBC
- Release: October 11, 1954 – October 2, 1956

Big Town is an American television dramatic series that was broadcast beginning on October 5, 1950, and ending on October 2, 1956. It debuted on CBS and moved to NBC in 1954.

== Overview ==
Big Town began as an American radio series of the same name (1937–1952). The series was set in fictitious Big Town, with stories centered around The Illustrated Press newspaper, the largest and most influential paper in the city. The newspaper's motto was "Freedom of the press is a flaming sword. Use it justly; hold it high; guard it well." The main characters were Steve Wilson and Lorelei Kilbourne. Guest stars included Dennis Weaver, Tommy Kirk, Russell Thorson, Marianne Stewart, Richard Kiley, and Audra Lindley.

== CBS version ==
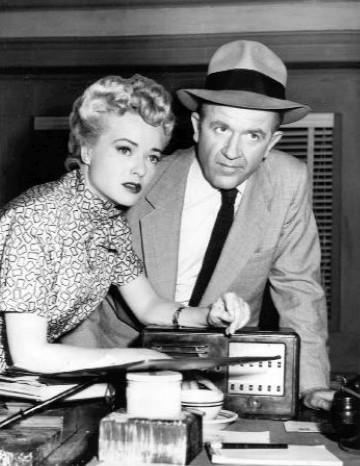
Jane Nigh As Lorelei Kilbourne and Patrick McVey as Steve Wilson in Big Town

Big Town was on CBS from October 5, 1950, through September 16, 1954. When the TV version began, Wilson was the newspaper's former managing editor who had become an "intrepid crime reporter", with Kilbourne covering society news and "obviously sweet on Wilson". Kilbourne was the first female reporter on TV. Episodes depicted her as "getting stories and sometimes getting mad, even calling out her boss." Patrick McVey portrayed Wilson, while a different actress played Kilbourne in each of the four seasons. They were Mary K. Wells, Julie Stevens, Jane Nigh, and Beverly Tyler. It was broadcast on Thursdays from 9:30 to 10 p.m. Eastern Time. From February 1953 through July 1953, Dumont carried reruns of the CBS episodes with the title City Assignment on Fridays from 8 to 8:30 p.m. E. T.

McVey eventually grew tired of working in the series. TV Guide reported, "McVey, who played Steve Wilson on Big Town until the sight of a front page made him wince, had decided ... to get out from under and look for something new." His desire to depart led to a new actor in the role of Wilson and a new network for the program.

=== Music ===
Albert Glasser composed music for Big Town, creating "one of the first scores specifically conceived as a library of original music for a single series." Glasser began by composing music for specific kinds of scenes (such as chases, romance, driving, and fighting) with scripts determining his concept of the score. He added orchestration to all of the scenes and sent the result to a friend in Paris. The friend had the music copied (at much less expense than it would have been in the United States), after which the friend gathered musicians and recorded all of the music on quarter-inch tape. Glasser said that the show's main theme was an effort to convey "the exciting rhythms of traffic in the big city, with a sweeping melodic line."

=== Episodes ===
Partial List of Episodes of Big Town on CBS
Date	Episode
October 19, 1950	"Mid-Air"
December 7, 1950	"$30,000"
November 15, 1951	"Night Trip"
December 20, 1951	"Christmas Trimmings"
December 27, 1951	"Solitaire"

== NBC version ==
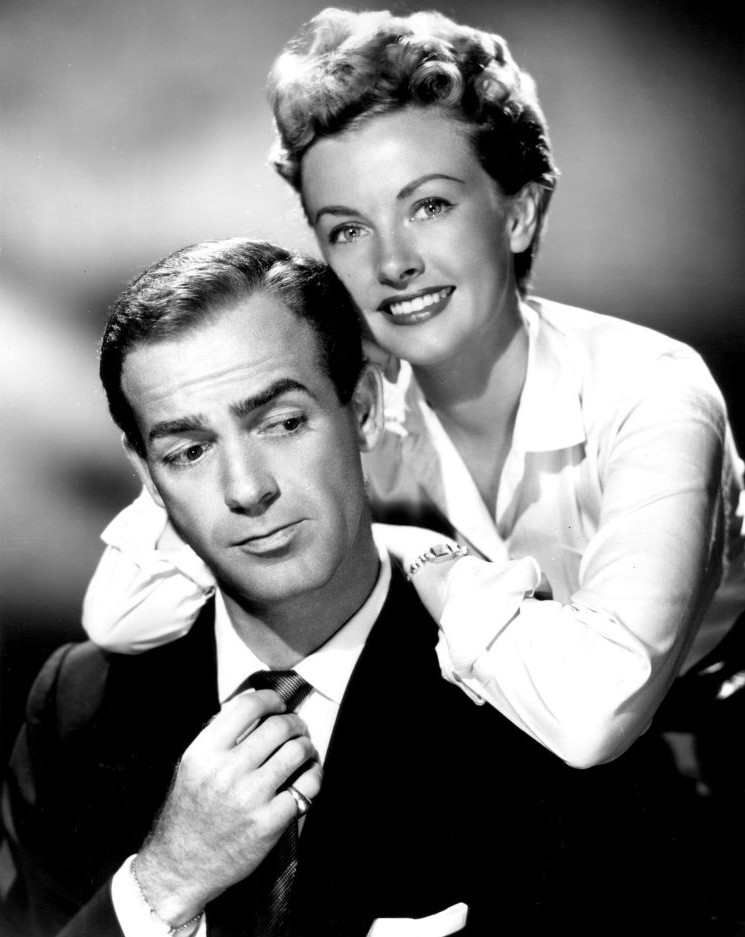
Mark Stevens as Steve Wilson and Trudy Wroe as Lorelei Kilbourne in Big Town

When Big Town was moved to NBC, beginning on October 11, 1954, Wilson was managing editor, "actively involved in investigations". Mark Stevens portrayed Wilson, in addition to producing and directing the series. Trudy Wroe (selected from auditions of 100 actresses) played Kilbourne, but when the 1954-55 season ended, her character was dropped. Doe Avedon was added as Diane Walker, a commercial artist and romantic interest for Wilson. Other additions to the show included Lyn Stalmaster as Rush, an "ambitious young cub reporter"; John Doucette as Lieutenant Tom Gregory; and Barry Kelly as Charlie Anderson.

=== Addressing social problems ===
Stories sometimes related to real-life situations. The April 20, 1955, episode dealt with the "problem of regular, full-time employment for persons over 45, many of whom are dismissed through arbitrary regulations, while still at the peak of their work capacity." After the drama ended, Stevens interviewed James P. Mitchell, the United States Secretary of Labor, about the problem. On December 20, 1955, Stevens interviewed General Omar Bradley, a member of President Dwight Eisenhower's committee on employment of the physically handicapped, following a drama on that topic. Other problems that the series addressed included "black-market traffic in blood plasma, crookedness in the boxing business, [and] the low pay of school teachers."

In a related effort, the program conducted a contest that had people ages 11 throujgh 19 submitting essays on the topic "How I Would Solve the Juvenile Delinquency Problem" in connection with the November 1, 1955, episode about juvenile delinquency. The contest offered 24 prizes worth a total of $1000, with $300 going to the writer of the best essay. Each person who entered received a "personal courtesy press card" from The Illustrated Press. A 17-year-old girl from Saginaw, Michigan, won the top prize.

=== Music ===
The 1954 shift of networks, stars, and concepts resulted in sponsors' demands for revised music. Glasser developed a five-note phrase along the lines of the four-note musical phrase associated with Dragnet. He wrote "a ton of material, all based on those five notes", scored for eight French horns and two percussionists using cymbals, snare drums, vibes, and other instruments. The music used on episodes was recorded in Glasser's Los Angeles living room, with use of overdubbing enabling two horn players and one percussionist to create complete recordings.

=== Episodes ===
Partial List of Episodes of Big Town on NBC
Date	Episode
October 18, 1955	"Source of Information"
November 1, 1955	"Juvenile Gangs"
December 20, 1955	"Handicapped Worker"
April 10, 1956	"Beauty Contest"
April 17, 1956	"Arsonist"
April 24, 1956	"Waterfront"
May 1, 1956	"Country Editor"
May 8, 1956	"Adult Delinquents"
May 15, 1956	"Crime in the City Room"

== Production ==
Producers of Big Town included Stevens, Jack J. Gross, Philip N. Krasne, Lloyd Gross, and Charles Robinson. The series was originally produced by Gross-Krasne, Incorporated. In the summer of 1955, Stevens split from Gross and Krasne, forming Mark Stevens Television Productions to produce the show.

The series initially was performed live. It was changed to film in 1952. The series was presented live from New York until April 1952. when production moved to Hollywood and it was done on film.

Big Town was owned by Lever Brothers (for Good Luck Margarine, Lifebuoy Soap, and Rinso Blue) which alternated sponsorship with General Motors's A. C. Spark Plugs. Lever Brothers decided to end the series in 1956 because of low ratings and NBC's inability to move it to a different time slot.

Stevens's off-camera involvement developed after he became the star. He complained about the show's quality: "They were hiring minimum-rate directors, and so we were getting minimum-rate performances." The response to his complaints was, "Well, why don't you direct it yourself?" He became the show's director, and by the middle of the first season on NBC he was also writing scripts. His increasing involvement eventually led to formation of his own company to produce the show.

On NBC the show used what TV Guide described as "a new, semi-documentary treatment." Off-screen narration by Stevens linked scenes and allowed bridging of longer time spans. The NBC version debuted in October 1954, seen on Wednesdays from 10:30 to 11 p.m. E. T. Effective September 20, 1955, it was moved to Tuesdays from 10:30 to 11 p.m. E. T. The program was filmed at American National Studios in Hollywood. It originated from WRCA-TV in New York City and from KRCA-TV in Los Angeles.

== Syndication ==
After episodes' original airing, they were syndicated under three titles:

- Heart of the City - Episodes starring McVey.
- Headline - Episodes starring Stevens that were made in 1954-55.
- Byline Steve Wilson - Episodes starring Stevens that were made in 1955-56.

== Critical response ==
The reference book The Complete Directory to Prime Time Network and Cable TV Shows 1946-Present said that Big Town "was an immediate hit" when it moved to TV, and the book Lou Grant: The Making of TV's Top Newspaper Drama said, "Big Town was a hit in both media" (radio and TV). Jim Harmon wrote in The Great Radio Heroes that McVey's portrayal of Wilson "did practically nothing but observe other people's problems".

TV Guide magazine described the CBS version of Big Town as "a routine cops-and-robbers show in which the managing editor and the girl reporter were forever chasing after gangsters and replating Page One." In a different review, the magazine described the NBC version as having more credible situations, resulting in "a sharper, more realistic telefilm series that should attract more viewers." It added that Stevens appeared to be "perfectly at home" as Wilson and noted the increased authenticity of the atmosphere at the newspaper.

A review of the premiere CBS episode in the trade publication Variety compared the video version favorably to the original on radio. The review complimented the script and the acting. Although it said, "Parts of Wilson and his girlfriend, Laurelei, were rather trite and cliche-ridden", it praised the characterizations of two supporting parts in the episode.
