= Mark Stevens (actor) =

American actor (1916–1994)

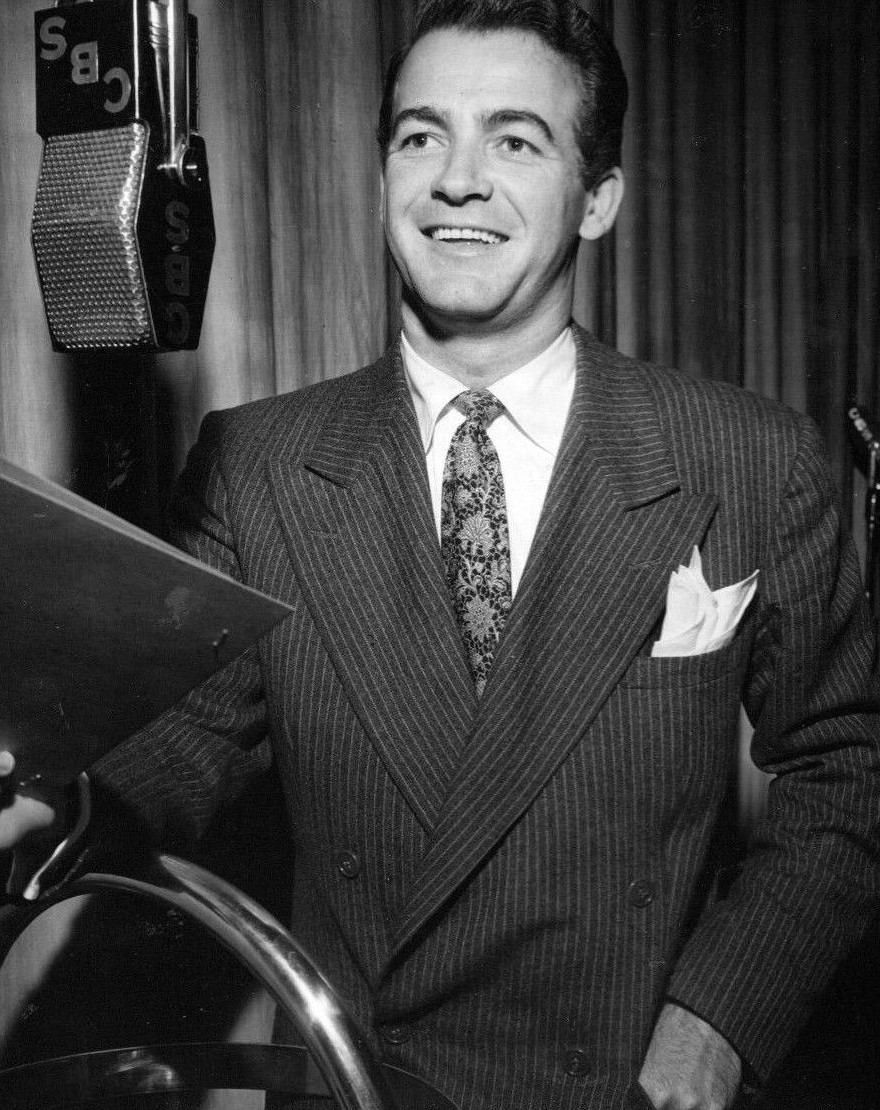
- Stevens in 1950
- Born: Richard William Stevens; December 13, 1916; Cleveland, Ohio, U.S.
- Died: September 15, 1994 (aged 77); Majores, Spain
- Other names: Stephen Richards
- Occupation: Actor
- Years active: 1943–1987
- Spouse: Annelle Hayes (m. 1945; div. 1962)
- Children: 2

Mark Stevens (born Richard William Stevens; December 13, 1916 – September 15, 1994) was an American actor who appeared in films and on television. He was one of four men who played the lead role in the television series Martin Kane, Private Eye, appearing in 1953–54.

== Early life ==
Born in Cleveland, Ohio, Stevens first studied to become a painter before becoming active in theater work. He then launched a radio career as an announcer in Akron.

== Early career ==
=== Warner Bros. ===
Moving to Hollywood, Stevens became a Warner Bros. contract actor at $100 a week in 1943. The studio darkened and straightened his curly red hair and covered his freckles. At first he was billed as Stephen Richards, assigned to small, often uncredited parts in which he played servicemen in films such as Destination Tokyo (1943), Passage to Marseille (1944), The Doughgirls (1944), Hollywood Canteen (1944), Objective, Burma! (1945), God Is My Co-Pilot (1945), The Horn Blows at Midnight (1945), Rhapsody in Blue (1945) and Pride of the Marines (1945).

== Career at 20th Century-Fox ==
Stevens was signed to 20th Century-Fox and changed his stage name to Mark Stevens at the suggestion of Darryl Zanuck.

His first film for the studio was Within These Walls (1945), playing the romantic male lead. Stevens was borrowed by RKO to play the lead role in From This Day Forward (1946) with Joan Fontaine.

At Fox, Stevens appeared in The Dark Corner (1946) with Lucille Ball and Clifton Webb, a film noir that attempted to repeat the success of Laura (1944). In 1946, exhibitors voted him the fifth-most promising "star of tomorrow."

Fox cast Stevens in the hit musical I Wonder Who's Kissing Her Now (1947), playing Joseph E. Howard. Also successful was The Street With No Name (1948), in which Stevens played an FBI man on an undercover assignment, and The Snake Pit (1948), in which he played Olivia de Havilland's loyal husband.

Stevens appeared in the Western Sand (1949) and another musical biopic with Haver, Oh, You Beautiful Doll (1949), playing Fred Fisher. He supported William Powell in Dancing in the Dark (1949). He was borrowed by MGM to play Matthew Kinston, one of Deborah Kerr's three suitors in Please Believe Me (1950). For Columbia, he starred in the film noir Between Midnight and Dawn (1950).

== Career after 20th Century-Fox ==
Stevens next signed a contract at Universal and appeared in Target Unknown (1951), Katie Did It (1951), Little Egypt (1951) and Reunion in Reno (1951).

In 1951, he starred in the DuMont series News Gal, which was later syndicated on ABC in 1957.

Stevens appeared in Mutiny (1952) for the King Brothers and traveled to England to appear in The Lost Hours (1952). He appeared in Torpedo Alley (1953) and took the lead role in the Martin Kane, Private Eye television series from 1953 to 1954.

From 1954 to 1956, Stevens played a newspaper managing editor in the series Big Town, having replaced Patrick McVey, who starred in the role from 1950 to 1954. Reruns of Big Town began airing on DuMont under the title City Assignment while new episodes of the series were still appearing on CBS.

== As director ==
In the 1950s and 1960s, Stevens directed and starred in several features: Cry Vengeance (1954), Time Table (1956), Gun Fever (1958), Man on a Raft (1958), The Man in the Water (1963) and Sunscorched (1965). In a contemporary review for Time Table, New York Times critic Milton Esterow called Stevens "the latest Hollywood triple-threat" for his versatility as a director, film actor and television star.

As an actor, he appeared in Gunsight Ridge (1956), September Storm (1960) and Fate Is the Hunter (1964).

== Later career ==
Beginning in the 1960s, Stevens lived in semi-retirement in Spain. His occasional film credits included Spain Again (1969) and The Fury of the Wolfman (1972). In the 1980s, he made guest appearances on television shows including Magnum, P.I. and Murder, She Wrote.

== Death ==
On September 15, 1994, Stevens died of cancer in Mallorca, Spain at the age of 77.

For his contribution to the television industry, Mark Stevens has a star on Hollywood's Walk of Fame at 6637 Hollywood Boulevard.

== Filmography ==
Year	Title	Role	Notes
1943	Destination Tokyo	Admiral's aide	uncredited
1944	Passage to Marseille	Lieutenant Hastings	uncredited
1944	Roaring Guns	Lance Ferris	as Stephen Richards
1944	Hollywood Canteen	Soldier on deck	uncredited
1945	Objective, Burma!	Lt. Barker	as Stephen Richards
1945	God Is My Co-Pilot	Sgt. Baldridge	as Stephen Richards
1945	The Horn Blows at Midnight	Angel	uncredited
1945	Rhapsody in Blue	Steve	uncredited
1945	Within These Walls	Steve Purcell	
1945	Pride of the Marines	Ainslee	as Stephen Richards
1946	From This Day Forward	Bill Cummings	
1946	The Dark Corner	Bradford Galt	
1947	I Wonder Who's Kissing Her Now	Joe Howard	
1948	The Street with No Name	Gene Cordell/George Manly	
1948	The Snake Pit	Robert Cunningham	
1949	Sand	Jeff Keane	
1949	Oh, You Beautiful Doll	Larry Kelly	
1949	Dancing in the Dark	Bill Davis	
1950	Please Believe Me	Matthew Kinston	
1950	Between Midnight and Dawn	Officer Rocky Barnes	
1951	Target Unknown	Capt. Jerome 'Steve' Stevens	
1951	Katie Did It	Peter Van Arden	
1951	Little Egypt	Wayne Cravat	
1951	Reunion in Reno	Norman Drake	
1952	Mutiny	Capt. James Marshall	
1952	The Lost Hours	Paul Smith	
1952	Torpedo Alley	Lt. Bob Bingham	
1953	Jack Slade	Joseph Alfred Slade	
1954	Cry Vengeance	Vic Barron	also director
1956	Time Table	Charlie Norman	also director
1957	Gunsight Ridge	Velvet Clark	
1958	Gun Fever	Luke Ram	also director
1958	Gunsmoke in Tucson	Jedediah (Chip) Coburn	
1960	September Storm	Joe Balfour	
1963	Escape from Hell Island	Capt. James	also director
1964	Fate Is the Hunter	Mickey Doolan	
1964	Frozen Alive	Dr. Frank Overton	original title: Der Fall X701
1965	Sunscorched	Sheriff Jeff Kinsley	original title: Tierra de fuego
1969	Cry for Poor Wally	Gaylord Blue – Radio DJ	

== Television ==
Year	Title	Role	Notes
1957	Wagon Train	Nels Stack	"The Nels Stack Story"
1957	Dick Powell's Zane Grey Theatre	Capt. John Hunter	episode: "Dangerous Orders"
1958	Zane Grey Theatre	Cort McConnell	episode: "The Stranger"
1958	Decision	Michael Shayne	episode: "Man on a Raft"
1962	Rawhide	John Shepard	episode: "Incident of the Hunter"
1978	The Eddie Capra Mysteries	Michael Ballinger	episode: "How Do I Kill Thee?"
1986	Murder, She Wrote	Nick Brody	episode: "Obituary for a Dead Anchor"

== Radio ==
Year	Program	Role	Notes
1947	Suspense	Jimmy Dawson	episode: "Tree of Life"
1947	Lux Radio Theater	Bradford Gault	The Dark Corner
1947	Suspense	Bill Cummings	episode: From This Day Forward
1952	Cavalcade of America	Thaddeus Fairbanks	episode: "The Yankee and the Scales"
