= Don Durant =

American actor and businessman (1932–2005)

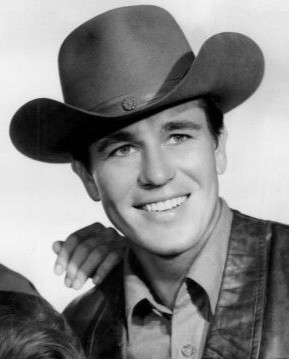
- Durant in Johnny Ringo, 1959
- Born: Donald Allison Durae; November 20, 1932; Long Beach, California, US
- Died: March 15, 2005 (aged 72); Monarch Beach, California, US
- Resting place: Pacific View Memorial Park, Corona del Mar, California
- Occupations: Actor and Businessman
- Spouse: Trudy Wroe (m. 1959)
- Children: 2
- Website: http://www.johnnyringo.net/

Don Durant (born Donald Allison Durae; November 20, 1932 – March 15, 2005) was an American actor and singer, best known for his role as the gunslinger-turned-sheriff in the CBS Western series Johnny Ringo, which ran on Thursdays from October 1, 1959 to June 30, 1960.

== Background ==
Durant was born Donald Allison Durae in Long Beach, California. His father was killed in a truck accident near Bakersfield two months before Durant's birth; his mother remarried three times before she died of lung cancer at the age of only forty-six in 1959. Durant himself was seriously injured a few weeks before his eleventh birthday, when his bicycle chain broke, and he careened into the path of a cement truck. He lay in a coma for three days, his right arm fractured, his right femur and hip so badly damaged that doctors nearly amputated the leg before his family scraped up enough money for a specialist. Young Durant was bedridden for more than a year.

== Singer and actor ==
Durant then began touring the American West as a singer/actor. He opened at many prestigious nightclubs, such as The Sands and the Sahara in Las Vegas. He garnered a small role in the 1955 Van Heflin film Battle Cry. To supplement his income, Durant taught actors how to ride horses and shoot guns, and worked at RCA as a technician. He helped to build the first kinescopic recorder and stereophonic sound recorder for Warner Brothers. In 1954, he signed with CBS to take small roles as the singer or young lover in a variety of legendary series, including The Jack Benny Show. He sang Groucho Marx's popular "It's delightful, it's Delovely, it's DeSoto" advertising jingle for the former DeSoto automobiles.

In 1955, Durant met big band leader Ray Anthony and began filming various television advertisements. One for Papermate pens featured his future wife, the former Trudy Wroe, but he did not meet her at the time because his voice was dubbed into the commercial to replace her co-star. In 1956, Durant starred and did his own stunts in Roger Corman's She-Gods of Shark Reef, which became a cult classic. Continuing to tour, he sang on Anthony's ABC variety series and recorded an album. He also appeared in an episode of Sergeant Preston of the Yukon the same year as Jack Elders, son of Tom Elders played by George Selk titled "The Limping King" and another episode titled "Phantom of Phoenixville" as Jack Flynn.

He appeared on another syndicated series, Rescue 8, starring Jim Davis and Lang Jeffries, and in the first episode of the ABC/Warner Brothers western series Maverick to feature Jack Kelly as Bart Maverick, the brother of Bret Maverick (James Garner). Durant had auditioned for the role of Bart but was instead cast as a singing bad guy in the episode. For that part, he learned to play the guitar the weekend before filming.

In 1957, celebrity journalist Walter Winchell reported that Durant was courting Carole Mathews, an actress twelve years his senior, who in 1958 joined the cast of the NBC western series, The Californians. About this time, Durant met Wroe while they were en route to film an advertisement for the Ford Motor Company. She spent most of the trip gushing over Elvis Presley. Durant told her that he had been to a few of Presley's parties, and the two began dating. They wed on February 28, 1959, and were together until his death.

On March 1, 1959, the day after Durant's marriage, he appeared on CBS in the role of Pat Sharkey in the episode "Body of the Crime" of the drama series, Richard Diamond, Private Detective, starring David Janssen. Durant also appeared as the villain in a first season episode of Wanted: Dead or Alive.

In 1958, Durant shot an unsuccessful pilot which caught the attention of actor/director/producer Dick Powell. As the host of Zane Grey Theater, Powell asked one of his writers, young Aaron Spelling, to create a series for Durant. Spelling was then in his first assignment as a creator and producer. In this heyday of the television Western, CBS quickly snapped up the pilot. Durant wrote and sang the theme and did his own stunts. Hence, Johnny Ringo, set in the Arizona Territory, debuted in the fall of 1959 in the Thursday 8:30 Eastern time slot. Costar Mark Goddard played the deputy named Cully, and Karen Sharpe was cast as Laura Thomas, Ringo's girlfriend and the daughter of Case Thomas, another deputy and a storekeeper played by Terence De Marney. Johnny Ringo's main competition came from Walter Brennan's The Real McCoys on ABC, against which Ringo achieved decent ratings. Sometimes it was in the "Top 20".

Many famous actors guest-starred on Johnny Ringo. The Johnny Ringo Playset became the most sought-after television western toy. Surprisingly, the sponsor, Johnson Wax Company, believed that there were too many Westerns (thirty at the time) on network television and wanted to replace one of their own with a sitcom. Dick Powell was out of the country, and Spelling had moved on to another project. With no strong advocates for survival, Johnny Ringo was cancelled after one season of thirty-eight episodes. Neither NBC nor ABC was interested in taking over production of Johnny Ringo.

Durant continued to make personal appearances (which paid more than his television salary had), guest-starred in CBS's Perry Mason and The Twilight Zone, and was nearly cast opposite Lucille Ball in her Broadway debut, Wildcat!, which flopped.

Durant signed a contract with another studio, but aside from a 1963 guest role on NBC's Laramie western series with John Smith and Robert Fuller as Slim Sherman and Jess Harper, respectively, few offers materialized. On Laramie, Durant was cast as Gandy Ross, a likable safecracker trying to go straight, in the episode "No Place to Run".

== Later years ==
Durant bought out his contract in 1964; and, because big bands had faded in the pop music fever, he subsequently retired from show business.

In 1992, Durant contracted chronic lymphocytic leukemia and, thereafter, lymphoma. In early 2005, he contracted a lung infection but was not hospitalized. He soon died at his home in Monarch Beach, California. He was buried at Pacific View Memorial Park in Corona del Mar, California. The Durants had a son, Jeff, and a daughter, Heidi.

== Selected filmography ==
- Perry Mason (1958) S1E27: "The Case of the Desperate Daughter" as Gary Marshall
- Wagon Train (1957) S1E8: "The John Darro Story" as Lucas, the ballad singer
- Colgate Theatre (1958) S1E6: "McCreedy's Woman" as Nicky Weston
- Alfred Hitchcock Presents (1962) S7E34: "The Twelve Hour Caper" as Lowe
