= Patrick McVey =

American actor

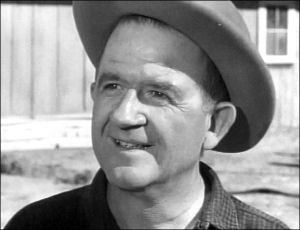
- Patrick Mcvey in The Rifleman episode "The Quiet Fear" as Jake Striker
- Born: March 17, 1910; Fort Wayne, Indiana, U.S.
- Died: July 6, 1973 (aged 63); New York City, New York, U.S.
- Other names: Pat McVeigh; Pat McVey
- Occupation: Actor
- Years active: 1941–1973
- Spouse: Courteen Landis

Patrick McVey (March 17, 1910 – July 6, 1973) was an American actor who starred in three television series between 1950 and 1961: Big Town, Boots and Saddles, and Manhunt.

== Early life ==
McVey was born in Fort Wayne, Indiana. His education included undergraduate and law degrees from Indiana University. He was an attorney before he became interested in acting. His early acting experience came in little theater productions, and he later honed his skills at Pasadena Community Playhouse.

== Career ==
McVey had experience on stage before his film debut in 1941, when he made uncredited appearances in eight films, beginning with Caught in the Draft. More than a dozen uncredited film roles followed in 1942. In 1946, he appeared in director Jean Yarbrough's thriller The Brute Man. McVey seldom rose above supporting roles in films but had more success on television.

His Broadway credits include Camino Real (1969), The Time of Your Life (1969), and Hold It! (1947).

A life member of The Actors Studio, McVey made his small screen debut on September 5, 1950, in the early series Suspense. On the following week's episode, he had his first starring role, and less than a month later, McVey began a four-year role (160 episodes) as Steve Wilson, the crusading managing editor in Big Town, a melodrama set in a newspaper office in a large American city. He left the series in 1954. The same year, McVey appeared in two episodes of Kraft Television Theater. Thereafter, McVey guest-starred on The Gale Storm Show, The Millionaire, Playhouse 90, Hazel, Bourbon Street Beat, and in four Westerns: The Restless Gun, Man Without a Gun, Sugarfoot, and Bat Masterson.

From 1957 to 1958, McVey co-starred in the syndicated series Boots and Saddles as Lieutenant Colonel Wesley Hayes. After the series ended in 1958, McVey was cast as police reporter Ben Andrews in Manhunt. Manhunt was canceled in 1961, and McVey continued his career with guest roles on various television series, including General Electric Theater, Cheyenne, Tombstone Territory, The Rifleman, Have Gun – Will Travel, The Virginian, Gunsmoke and three appearances on Perry Mason, including the role of District Attorney Covington in the 1959 episode "The Case of the Dubious Bridegroom."

McVey's last television roles were in the CBS drama The Nurses and as the character John Harris in the soap opera Dark Shadows (1966). In 1968, he was cast in Frank Sinatra's The Detective. In 1972, he played Dr. Hansen in 7 episodes of the soap opera The Doctors. McVey made his last on-screen appearance in the 1973 film Bang the Drum Slowly.

== Personal life and death ==
McVey was married to Courteen Landis, a Broadway performer. He died on July 6, 1973, at Lenox Hill Hospital in New York City, and his ashes were scattered into the Atlantic Ocean.

== Filmography ==
- Caught in the Draft (1941) - Soldier with Warning of Retreat (uncredited)
- Sergeant York (1941) - Soldier (uncredited)
- Navy Blues (1941) - Marine Military Policeman (uncredited)
- Always Tomorrow: The Portrait of an American Business (1941) - Joe - Earlier Sales Manager (uncredited)
- Blues in the Night (1941) - Waiter (uncredited)
- They Died with Their Boots On (1941) - Cpl. Jones (uncredited)
- Glamour Boy (1941) - Trooper on Phone (uncredited)
- Steel Against the Sky (1941) - Construction Worker (uncredited)
- You're in the Army Now (1941) - Supply Man - Union Suits (uncredited)
- Pacific Blackout (1941) - Police Radio Operator (uncredited)
- The Man Who Came to Dinner (1942) - Harry (uncredited)
- Private Snuffy Smith (1942) - Lloyd
- Wild Bill Hickok Rides (1942) - Chicago Fireman (uncredited)
- To the Shores of Tripoli (1942) - Radio Operator (uncredited)
- Murder in the Big House (1942) - Chief Electrician
- Tarzan's New York Adventure (1942) - Policeman (uncredited)
- In This Our Life (1942) - Minor Role (uncredited)
- Juke Girl (1942) - Bean Picker (uncredited)
- Calling Dr. Gillespie (1942) - Police Sergeant Hartwell (uncredited)
- Wings for the Eagle (1942) - (uncredited)
- Pierre of the Plains (1942) - Sgt. Dugan
- Invisible Agent (1942) - German (uncredited)
- The Talk of the Town (1942) - First Policeman (uncredited)
- Moonlight in Havana (1942) - Chuck (uncredited)
- You Can't Escape Forever (1942) - Reporter at Execution (uncredited)
- The Boogie Man Will Get You (1942) - Munitions Plant Road Guard (uncredited)
- The Mummy's Tomb (1942) - Jake Lovell, New York Record (uncredited)
- Stand By All Networks (1942) - Monty Johnson
- No Time for Love (1943) - City Chief Engineer (uncredited)
- Let's Have Fun (1943) - Bates (uncredited)
- Land and Live in the Jungle (1944) - Airman Pat McVey / Narrator (uncredited)
- Lost City of the Jungle (1946) - Police Officer [Ch. 13] (uncredited)
- O.S.S. (1946) - Plainclothesman (uncredited)
- Inside Job (1946) - Garner (uncredited)
- Two Guys from Milwaukee (1946) - Johnson
- The Brute Man (1946) - Detective at Helen's Apartment (uncredited)
- No Leave, No Love (1946) - Gruff Expectant Father (uncredited)
- Gentleman Joe Palooka (1946) - Reporter Lewis (uncredited)
- The Show-Off (1946) - Mike - Police Officer (uncredited)
- Swell Guy (1946) - Ray Link
- Easy Come, Easy Go (1947) - Gambler (uncredited)
- Suddenly It's Spring (1947) - Reporter (uncredited)
- Welcome Stranger (1947) - Ed Chanock
- Dark Passage (1947) - Impatient Cabbie (uncredited)
- The Big Caper (1957) - Sam Loxley
- The Restless Gun (1958) - as John Durant in Episode "Strange Family in Town"
- Party Girl (1958) - Detective O'Malley
- North by Northwest (1959) - Sergeant Flamm
- Perry Mason (1964) - Harry Mardig in "The Case of the Paper Bullets"
- The Detective (1968) - Tanner
- Desperate Characters (1971) - Mr. Haynes
- The Visitors (1972) - Harry Wayne
- Top of the Heap (1972) - Tim Cassidy
- Bang the Drum Slowly (1973) - Bruce's Father (final film role, posthumous release)
