= Dick Powell's Zane Grey Theatre =

American Western anthology TV series (1956–1961)

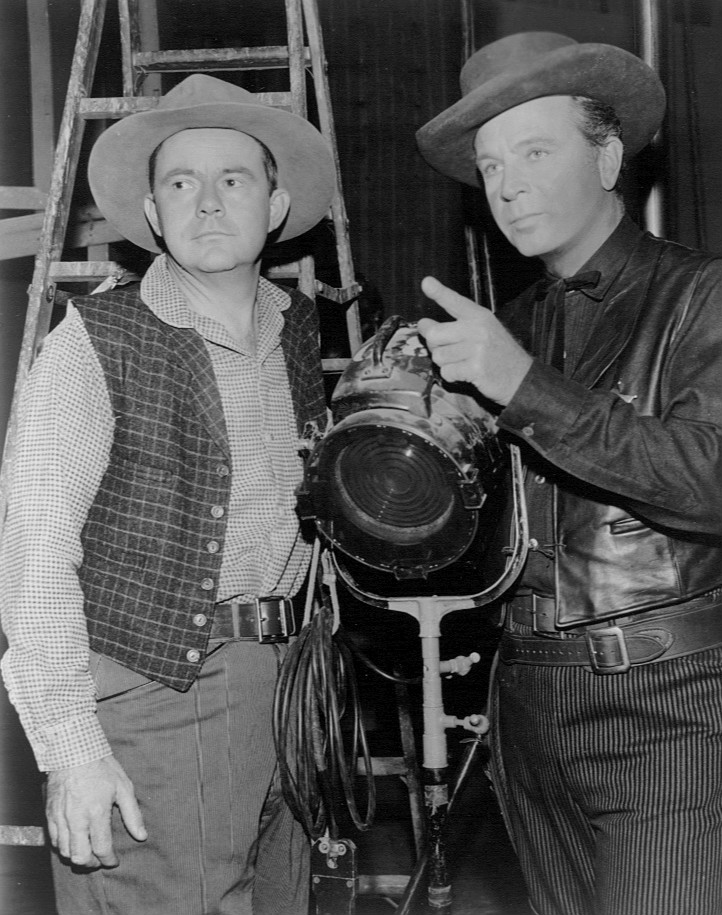
- Dick Powell with Loren Grey
- Genre: Western
- Starring: Dick Powell
- Theme music composer: Joseph Mullendore
- Composer: Earle Dearth
- Country of origin: United States
- Original language: English
- No. of seasons: 5
- No. of episodes: 146 (list of episodes)

Production
- Producer: Hal Hudson
- Production locations: Apacheland Studios, Gold Canyon, Arizona
- Camera setup: Multi-camera
- Running time: 25 minutes
- Production companies: Four Star Productions; Pamric Productions; Zane Grey Enterprises

Original release
- Network: CBS
- Release: October 5, 1956 – May 18, 1961

Dick Powell's Zane Grey Theatre is an American Western anthology television series that aired on CBS from October 5, 1956, to May 18, 1961.

== Synopsis ==
Many episodes were based on novels by Zane Grey, to all of which Four Star Films held exclusive rights. Dick Powell was the host and the star of some episodes. Many of the guest stars made their TV debuts on the program.

Powell said that working with Grey's stories proved to be both a benefit and a challenge. While he spoke of "the vast output of wonderful action stories from Zane Grey's pen", he acknowledged the challenge of "trying to compress a novel into half an hour of storytelling on television." Some stories could be adapted relatively easily, while others had to be skipped or only parts of them could be used for scripts. Over time, script writers used up the supply of adaptable material from Grey and began to adapt other authors' stories.

== Guest stars ==
Guest stars on the series included:

- Lyle Bettger
- Scott Brady
- Neville Brand
- Walter Brennan
- Lloyd Bridges
- Rory Calhoun
- Sunset Carson
- Peggie Castle
- Lee J. Cobb
- James Coburn
- Chuck Connors
- Joseph Cotten
- John Dehner
- Richard Dix
- Brian Donlevy
- Dan Duryea
- Paul Fix
- Skip Homeier
- Dennis Hopper
- John Hoyt
- Clair Huffaker
- John Ireland
- Dean Jagger
- Brian Keith
- Cloris Leachman
- Stephen McNally
- Guy Madison
- Virginia Mayo
- Vera Miles
- Edmond O'Brien
- Jack Palance
- Michael Pate
- John Payne
- Ronald Reagan
- Robert Ryan
- Barbara Stanwyck
- Barry Sullivan

== Episodes ==
Season	Episodes	Originally released		Rank	Rating	Average viewership (in millions)
Season	Episodes	First released	Last released	Rank	Rating	Average viewership (in millions)
1	29	October 5, 1956	June 21, 1957	—N/a	—N/a	—N/a
2	29	October 4, 1957	June 6, 1958	21	27.9	11.7
3	29	October 4, 1958	June 4, 1959	13	28.3 (Note: Tied with Father Knows Best)	12.4
4	29	October 1, 1959	May 5, 1960	21	24.4 (Note: Tied with General Electric Theater and Mr. Lucky (TV series))	11.2
5	30	October 6, 1960	May 18, 1961	—N/a	—N/a	—N/a

== Production ==
=== Development ===
The Zane Grey Radio Show had run for one season beginning in 1947 and had little in common with the stories of Zane Grey. The television series, however, began as an attempt to dramatize Zane Grey's short stories and novels. Four Star Films acquired the rights to at least 40 Zane Grey works before filming began. However, it soon became evident that Grey's stories were too complex to fit into a 30-minute episode, and so with few exceptions, the scripts were all original.

Four Star Films was the producing company, with Powell as executive producer. Producers included Helen Ainsworth, Hal Hudson, and Aaron Spelling. Directors included Felix Feist, William D. Faralla, James Sheldon, and Budd Boetticher. Writers included John McGreevey and Marion Hargrove.

Sponsors included Johnson Wax.

=== Preview ===
A preview of the show in the trade publication Billboard indicated that it would appeal to women viewers as well as to men. It noted that among the stories adapted from Grey's work "There will usually be strong love interests."

== Release ==
=== Broadcast ===
Season	Time
1 (1956–57)	Fridays at 8:30–9:00 PM
2 (1957–58)	Fridays at 8:30–9:00 PM
3 (1958–59)	Thursdays at 9:00–9:30 PM
4 (1959–60)	Thursdays at 9:00–9:30 PM
5 (1960–61)	Thursdays at 8:30–9:00 PM

Note: All times Eastern

Zane Grey Theatre first aired on Fridays when it replaced Our Miss Brooks in the fall of 1956. It then moved to Thursdays during its third season.

In the summer of 1959, episodes of the program were repeated on a "rerun subsidiary" titled Frontier Justice, with Melvyn Douglas as host, on Mondays from 9 to 9:30 P.M. ET.

In August 1961, Zane Grey Theatre was one of four programs whose episodes were sold to Procter & Gamble to be broadcast in Canada.

Zane Grey Theatre ended when Powell moved to NBC's, The Dick Powell Show.

There was then an additional 1962 summer run which consisted of reruns of previous episodes.

=== Home media ===
DVD name	Ep#	Release date
The Complete First Season	29	June 9, 2009
The Complete Second Season	29	September 30, 2014
The Complete Third Season	29	December 2, 2014
The Complete Fourth Season		N/A
The Complete Fifth Season		N/A

== Reception ==
In early February 1957, Billboard evaluated Zane Grey Theatre as "one of the strong contenders for the title of most important new show, according to many of its ratings."

TV Guide called the show "an educated 20th century view of the Old West".

After five seasons, CBS ran a sixth season composed of reruns of the best episodes.

== Spin-offs ==
Five television Westerns began as episodes of Zane Grey Theatre: Trackdown, starring Robert Culp ("Badge of Honor"), The Rifleman, starring Chuck Connors ("Sharpshooter"), Johnny Ringo, starring Don Durrant ("The Loner"), The Westerner, starring Brian Keith ("Trouble at Tres Cruces"), and Black Saddle, starring Chris Alcaide ("A Threat of Violence"). Alcaide was replaced by Peter Breck in the principal role when Black Saddle was sold as a series. The "lineage" of Zane Grey Theatre also includes the NBC series, Law of the Plainsman, which originated from a February 17, 1959 episode of The Rifleman starring Michael Ansara as Marshal Sam Buckhart (The Indian).
