= Peter Loves Mary =

American sitcom

- Genre: Sitcom
- Created by: Danny Simon
- Starring: Peter Lind Hayes; Mary Healy
- Composer: Buddy Bregman
- Country of origin: United States
- Original language: English
- No. of seasons: 1
- No. of episodes: 32

Production
- Camera setup: Multi-camera
- Running time: 30 minutes
- Production company: Four Star-Mirisch-Mount Tom

Original release
- Network: NBC
- Release: October 12, 1960 – May 31, 1961

Peter Loves Mary is an American sitcom starring Peter Lind Hayes and Mary Healy which centers around a show-business couple and their family who move from New York City to the suburbs. Original episodes aired from 12 October 1960 until 31 May 1961.

== Synopsis ==
Mary Healy and Peter Lind Hayes as Mary and Peter Lindsey in a promotional photograph for Peter Loves Mary.

Peter and Mary Lindsey are a headlining husband-and-wife nightclub act in which he is a corny comic and she is a singer. Mary and the Lindseys′ longtime housekeeper – the upbeat, wisecracking Wilma, who calls Peter "Squire Lindsey" — decide that it would be better for Peter and Mary's 8-year-old daughter Leslie (who without explanation ages into an 11-year-old as the season progresses) and 6-year-old son Steve to grow up in the suburbs rather than in the show-business life of the city. So, after 20 years on the road, the Lindsey family and Wilma move from New York City to 130 Maple Street in Oakdell — or Oakdale, according to some sources — Connecticut.

The move leaves the Lindseys having to juggle the competing demands of show-business life in the city and family life in the suburbs. Mary is the more level-headed and confident of the two, and her dream is to live the complete suburban lifestyle that she has read about in magazines of book clubs, the Garden Club of America, the parent–teacher association, local government, and working for social causes. Peter, who tends to be vain and paranoid, goes along with the move out of his love for Mary, but makes it reluctantly; he dislikes commuting and misses city life and socializing with their show-business friends in Manhattan. Peter still craves the spotlight and performs occasionally at the Imperial Room in Manhattan as well as for their suburban friends at parties Mary throws each week, but he also makes forays into suburban activities, serving as president of the Keep Oakdell (Oakdale) Beautiful Committee and chairman of the board of the High School Project, which seeks to finance the building of the town's first high school. Adding to the complexity – and often the chaos – of the Lindseys' move are visits from Mary's parents, the Gibneys, and the family's interactions with their neighbors and with Gladys, a sour housekeeper who works next door and is friends with Wilma.

== Production ==
In real life Peter Lind Hayes and Mary Healy were a married show-business couple who performed together for over 40 years and were famous at the time Peter Loves Mary premiered in 1960 for their work in radio, movies, and television. Also in real life, they had moved from New York City to the suburbs with their son and daughter and had juggled the demands of show-business life and those of suburban life – for example, broadcasting from their suburban home so that they could stay closer to their children – so Peter Loves Mary was semi-autobiographical for them. On television, they previously had starred together in The Peter Lind Hayes Show in 1950–1951, which had a format similar to that of Peter Loves Mary, although the earlier show had also included musical interludes.

Danny Simon created the format for Peter Loves Mary and developed it with Walter Mirisch. Billy Friedburg produced the show, and Buddy Bregman wrote the music for it.

== Cast ==
- Peter Lind Hayes as Peter Lindsey
- Mary Healy as Mary Lindsey
- Bea Benaderet as Wilma
- Merry Martin as Leslie Lindsey
- Gil Smith as Steve Lindsey
- Alan Reed as Happy Richman
- Howard Smith as Horace Gibney
- Arch Johnson as Charlie

== Broadcast history ==
Peter Loves Mary premiered on October 12, 1960, and aired on Wednesdays at 10:00 p.m. throughout its run. It was canceled after a single season and its last episode aired on May 31, 1961.

== Episodes ==
No.	Title	Directed by	Written by	Original release date
1	"The Suburbanites"	Rod Amateau	Danny Simon	October 12, 1960
Headlining nightclub entertainers Peter Lindsey and Mary Wheeler have just moved from New York City to Oakdell, Connecticut. Mary and their housekeeper Wilma believe that the suburbs will provide a better environment for Peter and Mary's children, Leslie and Steve, than the show-business world of the city. Wilma is still unpacking when Leslie and Steve decide they dislike the suburbs, but they soon change their minds when they begin playing in the back yard. Also unhappy with the move, Peter already misses city life and does not look forward to the commute, and when his business manager calls with an opportunity for Peter and Mary to star as replacements on The Jack Morgan Show, he wants to move back to New York. Mary says no, but Peter accepts his role. As he walks out the door he meets Bob Atwood, their tall, dashing, and handsome neighbor, who offers to help them get settled and is good at repairing things around the house that Peter does not know how to fix. Suspicious and jealous of Bob, Peter becomes so tense before the show in New York that his back goes into spasm, and although he recovers in time for the show, he can't get his mind off of Bob, going off-script and mixing him into a comedy routine. After the show, Peter and Mary have a heart-to-heart talk about their future. Glenn Langan and Howard McNear guest-star.
2	"High Society"	Sidney Miller	Terry Ryan, David Schwartz, and Billy Friedberg	October 19, 1960
After settling into their new home in the suburbs, the Lindseys are determined to receive an invitation to a party considered the social event of the year. Paul Hartman, Katherine Squire, Linda Watkins, Pattie Regan, Viola Harris, and Basil Howes guest-star.
3	"Wilma"	Sidney Miller	Norman Barasch and Carrol Moore	October 26, 1960
Wilma begins to act strangely, prompting Peter and Mary to fear that she is going to quit and go to work for another family they are friends with. David Lewis, Joan Tompkins, Jess Kirkpatrick, Tom Vize, and Betty Garde guest-star.
4	"Make a Million"	Sidney Miller	Terry Ryan, David Schwartz, Billy Friedberg	November 2, 1960
After Peter gets swindled out of $10,000 while trying to make some easy money, he concocts an unusual plan to get it back. Allyn Joslyn, Marianne Stewart, Edward Peck, James Cavanaugh, and Alan Hewitt guest-star.
5	"Life With Father-in-Law"	Sidney Miller	Terry Ryan, David Schwartz, Billy Friedberg	November 9, 1960
Mary's parents come for a visit and create such havoc that Peter and Mary almost lose their new house.
6	"The Classic Car"	Sidney Miller	Terry Ryan, David Schwartz, Billy Friedberg	November 16, 1960
Peter and Mary and their next-door neighbors Barry and Gloria Watkins head for a week's vacation at Lake Placid, New York, but while on the road they suddenly find themselves involved in a race between classic automobiles. Ronny Graham, Sarah Marshall, Charles Seel, Henry Hunter, George Cisar, Olan Soulé, Russel Trent, Jody Warner, and John Bernard guest-star.
7	"A Star Is Born"	Sidney Miller	Terry Ryan, David Schwartz, Billy Friedberg	November 23, 1960
Peter is named director of the school play, and when he realizes that Leslie has no talent, he cuts the script to make her part as small as possible. Leo Fuchs, Barbara Heller, Susan Crane, Molly Dodd, Juney Ellis, Gena Gilespie, Larrian Gillespie, Casey Peters, and Hal Smith guest-star.
8	"Peter Joins a Committee"	Sidney Miller	Mel Diamond and Mel Tolkin	November 30, 1960
Peter is humiliated when he fails miserably as a member of a committee, provoking him into signing himself up for a world night club tour. Marty Ingels and Robert Hastings guest-star.
9	"The Best Women"	Sidney Miller	Mel Diamond and Mel Tolkin	December 7, 1960
Mary and two of her friends are candidates for the presidency of the local chapter of the Garden Club of America, and their husbands are fighting bitterly. Ronny Graham, Sarah Marshall, David Lewis, Joan Tompkins, Carol Veazie, Forrest Lewis, and Buck Young guest-star.
10	"Wilma′s Phantom Lover"	Sidney Miller	Mel Diamond and Mel Tolkin	December 14, 1960
Attempts by Peter and Mary to find a new romantic interest for Wilma plunge Wilma into a dreamy state.
11	"Peter Gets the Business"	Sidney Miller	Mel Diamond and Mel Tolkin	December 21, 1960
When Mary's parents come to visit, her father says that show business to too uncertain a profession and talks Peter into giving it up – and Peter learns the hard way that a buffoon can't be a tycoon. Harriet E. MacGibbon, Herb Ellis, Viola Harris, and Olan Soulé guest-star.
12	"Tin Pan Ali"	Robert Butler	Sam Locke and Joel Rapp	January 4, 1961
Peter and Mary meet a prince who wants to become a songwriter. Donald Buka, Herb Ellis, Joseph Ruskin, Ben Wright, King Calder, Robert B. Williams, and Jan Peters guest-star.
13	"Operation Red Dress"	Sidney Miller	Terry Ryan, David Schwartz, Billy Friedberg	January 11, 1961
Wearing his old United States Air Force uniform and carrying Mary's gown in an attaché case, Peter heads for a reunion in Washington, D.C., with old war buddies, but because of mistaken identity he winds up at a bomb test site on an Air Force base. Robert Hastings, Alvy Moore, Barney Phillips, Harry Holcombe, Charles Seel, Alan Dexter, Joe Perry, William Erwin, John Clarke and Nicholas Saunders guest-star.
14	"The Movie Star"	Sidney Miller	Terry Ryan, David Schwartz, Billy Friedberg	January 18, 1961
To Peter's great surprise two Hollywood producers "discover" him and ask him to audition for a dramatic leading role as "Charles Norman" in a new gangster movie called Racket Man. Peter does not view himself as a serious actor and says he does not want to break up his professional partnership with Mary, but she says that she will enjoy being "just a housewife" during the movie shoot and convinces him to take advantage of the opportunity. Peter struggles with the script, finding it difficult to capture the Norman character's hostility, wild jealousy, and strange infantile streak, and decides he cannot work without Mary. On the day of the screen test, a nervous Peter asks Mary come an audition with him, portraying Norman's sister. Peter's wildly over-the-top performance and a drawn-out death scene as his character is fatally shot dismay the film's producers. Mary impresses them, though, and they offer her the part of Norman's sister. Mary at first refuses to accept the role without Peter, but he convinces her to take it. While on the movie set to provide Mary with moral support, he meets two other men, Phil and Harry, whose wives are also starring in the film. As Phil and Harry discuss their boring daily plans, Peter realizes that he has been reduced to a "mink-holding gigolo," and he calls their manager Lou and begs him to reinstate their canceled gigs for him alone, determined not to be out of work during the filming. Mary admits that she cannot perform without Peter and Peter is soon recast in the movie in the role of the butler. Later, the movie receives lukewarm reviews and Peter and Mary's performances are deemed merely "adequate," though Peter finds that he still cannot entirely shake the character of Charles Norman. Werner Klemperer, Herb Ellis, Raph Bell, Lee Goodman, Herman Rudin, Oscar Beregi, Al Checco, and Fredd Wayne guest-star.
15	"Horace Gets Into the Act"	Sidney Miller	Mel Diamond and Mel Tolkin	January 25, 1961
Mary's father, Horace, talks her into leaving the act – then has second thoughts when he sees Peter's new partner, a pretty woman named Kim Mallory. Harriet E. MacGibbon, Herb Ellis, Nelson Omsted, Terry Huntingdon, and Jerry Barclay guest-star.
16	"Wilma's Apple Butter"	Sidney Miller	Terry Ryan (story & teleplay), Billy Friedberg (story)	February 1, 1961
Peter and Mary think that Wilma makes the best apple butter and make plans to market it – without realizing it is not homemade.
17	"The Last Train from Oakdell"	Sidney Miller	Sam Locke, Joel Rapp, and Mel Tolkin	February 8, 1961
Peter heads a committee to replace the dilapidated commuter railroad system with a new freeway – then learns that the proposed highway will cut through his own property. John McGiver, Claude Stroud, Henry Hunter, Ken Berry, Johnny Silver, Howard Wright, and John Sanderson guest-star.
18	"That Certain Age"	Sidney Miller	Billy Friedberg and Mel Diamond	February 22, 1961
Peter thinks he can handle teenagers pretty well, so he consents to direct the local high school play – but he begins to have second thoughts when one of the girls in the cast, saucy young Darcy Robinson, develops a crush on him. Yvonne Craig, Richard Gaines, and Bill Tennant guest-star.
19	"The Perfect Father"	Sidney Miller	Terry Ryan	March 1, 1961
Peter has a chance to play a father on a proposed television series, so he uses every paternal trick he knows to convince a sponsor that he is the perfect father for the show. John Emery, Claude Stroud, Herb Ellis, Bob Hastings, John Zaremba, and Stewart Bradley guest-star.
20	"Peter Writes a Book"	Sidney Miller	Sam Locke, Joel Rapp, and Mel Tolkin	March 8, 1961
Peter wants to publish his life story and Mary encourages him to do it. He hires Al Burton to ghost-write it for him, and trouble ensues when Burton takes it upon himself to make Peter's life more interesting by embellishing it with extra skeletons in Peter's family closet. Jack Wesson, Wally Vernon, Ken Mayer, Regina Gleason, Stanya Lowe, Bill Mullikin, Rosemary Eliot, and Gladys Hurlbut guest-star.
21	"Doctor's Dilemma"	Sidney Miller	Terry Ryan and Mel Diamond	March 15, 1961
Also entitled "Doc Bailey Day." Peter erroneously reports that Dr. Bailey, Oakdell's leading physician, is retiring, prompting civic leaders to schedule numerous festivities in his honor. But Dr. Bailey never told anyone he was going to retire – and has no plans to. Stuart Erwin, Jean Inness, J. Pat O'Malley, Harry Holcombe, Arthur Peterson, Cully Richards, Carter De Haven, Ernest Anderson, Elizabeth Talbot-Martin, and Dick Bernie guest-star.
22	"Getting Peter's Putter"	Sidney Miller	Sam Locke, Joel Rapp, and Mel Tolkin	March 22, 1961
Peter and his friend Bill Rogers both want to buy the same set of golf clubs. They cost a lot of trading stamps, so Peter sets out to buy everything he can think of to get enough stamps before Bill does.
23	"Peter Takes Stock"	Sidney Miller	Sam Locke, Joel Rapp, Mel Tolkin, and Mel Diamond	March 29, 1961
After Peter gets tricked into investing in a failing supper club as a favor to an old friend, he ends up working at the club as a waiter and bartender, and he and Mary have to perform their nightclub act to attract patrons. Ned Glass, Peter Leeds, Waren Parker, Eddie Hanley, Jack Powers, Jesse Jacobs, and Martin Roth guest-star.
24	"The Aptitude Test"	Sidney Miller	Mel Diamond and Terry Ryan	April 5, 1961
According to an intelligence test Peter takes, he is a genius. The rest of the Lindseys are shocked by the test result and do not believe it, so the psychologist who administered the test to Peter stops by the Lindsey house to explain. Frank Behrens, Sheila Bromley, Rickey Kelman, Rod Bell, Charles Irving, and Elliott Reid guest-star.
25	"Wilma's Uncle Charlie"	Robert Butler	Joel Rapp and Sam Locke	April 12, 1961
Wilma's lovable Uncle Charlie visits the Lindseys. He repairs Mary's broken household appliances and entrances the Lindsey children with his storytelling. Peter resents Charlie and is jealous of his popularity with Mary and the children, but learns a lesson in fatherhood. Wallace Ford, Robert P. Lieb, William Erwin, Donald Losby, Elizabeth Talbot-Martin, and Eddie Hanley guest-star.
26	"Witness for the Persecution"	Sidney Miller	Sam Locke, Joel Rapp, and Mel Tolkin	April 19, 1961
Peter's father-in-law Horace gets into a minor automobile accident and insists taking the case to court. Peter witnessed the accident – but refuses to testify on Horace's behalf. Lee Krieger and Connie Sawyer guest-star.
27	"Peter's Protégé"	Sidney Miller	Mel Diamond (story & teleplay), Mel Tolkin (teleplay), Billy Friedberg (story)	April 26, 1961
Jerry Arden is looking for a chance to get into show business, and Peter volunteers to mentor him – much to the displeasure of Jerry's fiancee Janet, who wants Jerry to become a dentist. Len Weinrib and Nancy Rennick guest-star.
28	"New Deal for Wilma"	Sidney Miller	Joel Rapp and Sam Locke	May 3, 1961
Alternative title "Wilma′s New Contract." Wilma begins to feel that her employers are working her too hard and taking advantage of her, so she demands that the Lindseys sit down with her and negotiate a contract specifying her duties once and for all. Betty Garde, Byron Morrow, and Carol Fleming guest-star.
29	"Mr. Santini Writes a Letter"	Sidney Miller	Mel Diamond and Mel Tolkin	May 10, 1961
After Mary begins to receive love letters that obviously are from Mr. Santini, owner of the local flower shop, Peter storms into the shop to confront Santini. Renzo Cesana, Pilar Seurat, Armand Largo, and Martin Roth guest-star.
30	"The Bridey Lindsey Story"	Sidney Miller	Sam Locke and Joel Rapp	May 17, 1961
At a performance by the hypnotist Professor Misto, Peter pretends to fall under his spell.
31	"No, My Darling Daughter"	Sidney Miller	Mel Diamond and Mel Tolkin	May 24, 1961
Peter worries that he is losing Leslie when he learns that she has a long line of admirers in elementary school, including her current boyfriend, Michael Taft – but he warms up to Michael when he finds that the boy is a wizard at playing the stock market. Robert Crawford, Jr., Bern Hofman, and Arnold Clifford guest-star.
32	"Birth of a Salesman"	Sidney Miller	Sam Locke and Joel Rapp	May 31, 1961
Peter and Mary think their nephew Wally is a real go-getter and decide to help him get a job as a clothing salesman.
