= Romance (American TV series) =

- Genre: Anthology
- Country of origin: United States
- Original language: English

Production
- Running time: 30 minutes

Original release
- Network: CBS
- Release: November 3 – December 29, 1949

Romance, also known as Theatre of Romance, is an American anthology series that aired live on CBS on Thursday nights at 8:30 PM from November 3, 1949, until December 29, 1949. The series aired on alternate Thursdays with Inside U.S.A. with Chevrolet.

All episodes were produced and directed by Robert Stevens. Guest stars included Steven Hill, Lilia Skala, Bethel Leslie, and Cara Williams.

The series replaced Sugar Hill Times.

== Synopsis ==
The series featured adaptions of famous love stories. It premiered with an updated version of Camille.
