= The Dinah Shore Chevy Show =

American TV series (1956–1963)

- The Dinah Shore Chevy Show intro screen
- Genre: Variety
- Directed by: Bob Banner
- Presented by: Dinah Shore
- Theme music composer: Leo Corday; Leon Carr
- Opening theme: "See The U.S.A. In Your Chevrolet"
- Country of origin: United States
- No. of seasons: 7
- No. of episodes: 118

Production
- Producers: Bob Banner; Robert Wells
- Running time: 50 minutes

Original release
- Network: NBC
- Release: October 5, 1956 – May 12, 1963

The Dinah Shore Chevy Show is an American variety series hosted by Dinah Shore, and broadcast on NBC from October 1956 to May 1963. The series was sponsored by the Chevrolet Motor Division of General Motors and its theme song, sung by Shore, was "See the U.S.A. in Your Chevrolet", which continued to be used in Chevrolet advertising for several more years after the cancellation of the show.

== Synopsis ==
The program began as a series of nine monthly specials substituting in the regular time slot of the Gillette Cavalcade of Sports. NBC first tested the singing star in an hour long format with two prime time specials early in 1956. The first Chevy Show episode aired on October 5, 1956, with Frank Sinatra as guest. By this time, Shore was already a veteran television performer, having hosted five seasons of the 15-minute-long Dinah Shore Show, also sustained by Chevrolet. It was in its final season (the final season for all 15-minute prime time network entertainment series) when The Dinah Shore Chevy Show was launched. The series featured celebrity guests from the worlds of music, theater, sports, and movies. During the fourth season, Carl Reiner was one of the show's writers and sometimes appeared on-camera as well, adding levity to a show which primarily focused on music.

The program was well-received and renewed the following fall as a weekly Sunday night series, broadcast in color, where it remained until Bonanza, another Chevy sponsored hour, moved from Saturday at 7:30 p.m. into that time slot for the 1961-62 season. Dinah ended her decade-long association with Chevrolet in 1961 and returned as part of an alternating Friday night lineup, with the show retitled simply The Dinah Shore Show, with S & H Green Stamps becoming her primary sponsor. In her final season, from October 14, 1962, to May 12, 1963, she appeared on Sunday nights at 10 p.m. following Bonanza alternating with Various NBC News Specials and The Du Pont Show of the Week. After 12 years with NBC, Dinah signed with ABC-TV in the fall of 1964 hosting four hour long specials sponsored by Purex.

In 1970 Dinah Shore returned as a staple of American television in various daytime talk shows for NBC and syndication for more than twenty years after the conclusion of this series.

The show won four Emmy Awards during its run.

Beginning in 2011 black-and-white kinescope episodes of the series aired on the Jewish Life Television network. Original color videotape episodes were added to the JLTV line up in 2015. This run concluded in 2017.

== Series regulars ==
=== Performers ===
- The Skylarks (1956–1957)
- The Even Dozen (1961–1962)

=== Dancers ===
- The Tony Charmoli Dancers (1957–1962)
- The Nick Castle Dancers (1962–1963)

=== Music ===
- The Harry Zimmerman Orchestra (1957–1961, 1962–1963)
- Frank DeVol and His Orchestra (1961–1962)

== List of guest stars ==
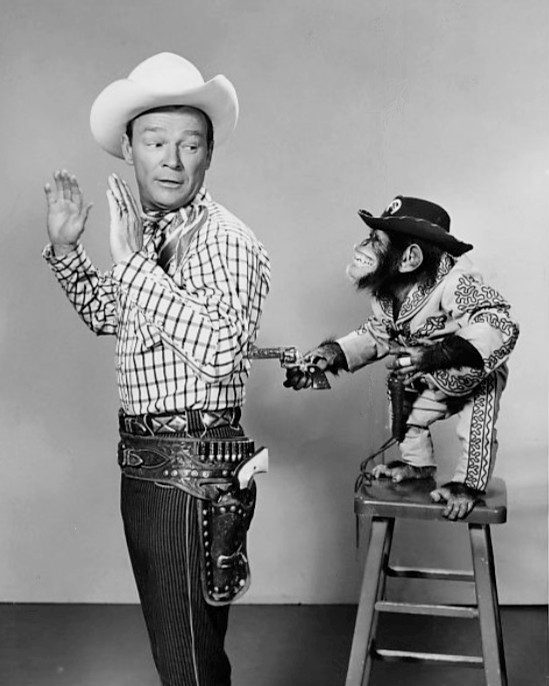
Guest star Roy Rogers (1960)

- Edie Adams (11-24-57)
- Anna Maria Alberghetti (4-20-58)
- Julie Andrews (1-12-58)
- Paul Anka (2-26-61)
- Eve Arden (4-13-58/1-11-59)
- Cliff Arquette (5-17-59/5-24-59/11-15-59)
- Pearl Bailey (1-24-60)
- Tony Bennett (5-31-59)
- Polly Bergen (1-31-60/4-9-61)
- Joey Bishop (4-19-57/3-20-60/4-30-61)
- Pat Boone (3-22-57/3-9-58/10-11-59)
- Rossano Brazzi (12-1-57/2-14-60)
- George Burns (4-19-59/4-24-60/12-29-61)
- Red Buttons (6-1-58)
- Sid Caesar (11-16-58)
- Art Carney (1-13-57/5-17-57/1-12-58/6-15-58/10-5-58/10-11-59/5-22-60/11-20-60)
- Johnny Carson (1-31-60)
- Marge and Gower Champion (4-10-56/11-24-57/2-9-58/6-15-58/10-19-58/5-10-59)
- Nat King Cole (10-9-60/12-29-61)
- Perry Como (1-17-56/1-13-57)
- Robert Cummings (10-27-57/3-9-58/11-30-58/5-10-59)
- Vic Damone (4-3-60/6-1-62)
- Bobby Darin (4-14-63)
- Bette Davis (2-23-58)
- Dizzy Dean (10-5-56/12-16-56)
- Dolores del Río (3-27-60)
- Howard Duff (5-18-58/1-10-60)
- Leo Durocher (4-16-61)
- Jimmy Durante (12-1-57/10-12-58)
- Dale Evans (12-16-56)
- Nanette Fabray (6-14-57/10-20-57/2-16-58/5-11-58/6-25-61/10-6-61)
- Douglas Fairbanks, Jr. (2-8-59)
- Ella Fitzgerald (10-12-58/3-8-59/1-10-60/12-11-60/3-17-63)
- Eddie Foy Jr. (5-11-58)
- Stan Freberg (6-29-58/7-13-58/7-27-58/8-10-58/9-28-58)
- Zsa Zsa Gabor (10-11-59)
- James Garner (2-26-61/4-16-61/11-11-62)
- Benny Goodman (2-28-60)
- George Gobel (11-30-56/2-15-59)
- Betty Grable (11-2-56/3-8-59/11-22-59/4-3-60)
- Jose Greco (4-20-58/11-16-58/4-5-59)
- Al Hirt (12-11-60/1-8-61/2-26-61/4-9-61 /10-6-61/2-17-63)
- Betty Hutton (5-17-57/3-23-58)
- Mahalia Jackson (6-1-58/11-16-58/3-22-59/12-6-59/5-22-60)
- Ingemar Johansson (10-4-59/1-24-60/2-5-61)
- Van Johnson (4-20-58/1-25-59/5-17-59)
- Dean Jones (6-14-57 /10-20-57)
- Louis Jourdan (10-5-58/2-1-59)
- Burl Ives (10-5-58/12-21-58)
- Boris Karloff (5-17-57/10-27-57)
- Stubby Kaye (1-17-56/4-10-56/1-13-57)
- Julius LaRosa (5-11-58/10-26-58)
- Peter Lawford (1-26-58/10-12-58/5-3-59)
- Steve Lawrence (2-23-58/6-8-58/5-10-59)
- Peggy Lee (5-17-59)
- Liberace (1-20-63)
- Ida Lupino (5-18-58/1-10-60)
- Gisele MacKenzie (1-17-56/5-11-58/2-22-59)
- Shirley MacLaine (11-30-56/3-22-57/11-3-57/3-9-58/6-8-58/12-14-58)
- Fred MacMurray (6-14-57/12-29-57)
- Gordon MacRae (11-23-58/2-22-59/3-20-60)
- Marcel Marceau (1-17-56/11-1-59)
- Dean Martin (4-10-56/4-19-57/11-3-61/11-11-62)
- Groucho Marx (10-4-59)
- Elaine May (5-8-58/12-28-58/5-31-59)
- Audrey Meadows (1-18-59/3-20-60/1-26-62)
- Ethel Merman (1-19-58/10-19-58)
- Ann Miller (12-29-57)
- George Montgomery (11-24-57/6-8-58/11-23-58/11-22-59/10-6-61)
- Mike Nichols (5-8-58/12-28-58/5-31-59)
- Red Norvo (1-11-59/4/12-59/4-24-60/5-14-61)
- Janis Paige (3-16-58/5-3-59/3-13-60)
- Minnie Pearl (6-14-57)
- Jane Powell (2-8-59)
- André Previn (2-15-59/3-15-59/1-31-60/4-30-61/4-14-63)
- Tony Randall (3-8-59/4-12-59)
- Carl Reiner (4-19-59/10-4-59/10-11-59/11-1-59/12-6-59/1-24-60/2-28-60/3-20-60/5-8-60)
- Ginger Rogers (5-18-58/3-22-59)
- Roy Rogers (12-16-56/12-22-57)
- Cesar Romero (3-22-59)
- Dick Shawn (1-11-59)
- Frank Sinatra (10-5-56/1-26-58/12-9-62)
- Keely Smith (11-24-57/4-5-59/2-23-62)
- Gale Storm (10-27-57/12-21-58)
- Barbra Streisand (5-12-63)
- Shirley Temple (5-4-58/12-14-58)
- Danny Thomas (10-20-57/10-19-58)
- Mel Tormé (2-16-58/2-8-59)
- Miyoshi Umeki (6-8-58/1-22-61)
- Gwen Verdon (10-5-58/10-4-59)
- Robert Wagner (11-3-57)
- Andy Williams (5-8-60/12-11-60)
- Jonathan Winters (10-23-60/3-5-61)
- Ed Wynn (2-16-58)
- Lucho Gatica (9-04-60)
