= Dr. T =

Dr. T may refer to:

- Dr. T & the Women, 2000 American romantic comedy film
- The 5,000 Fingers of Dr. T., 1953 American musical fantasy film
