= Zis Boom Bah =

1941 film by William Nigh

- Grace Hayes, Peter Lind Hayes, and Mary Healy in Zis Boom Bah (1941)
- Directed by: William Nigh
- Screenplay by: Harvey Gates; Jack Henley
- Story by: Connie Lee; Harvey Gates
- Produced by: Sam Katzman
- Starring: Grace Hayes; Peter Lind Hayes; Mary Healy
- Cinematography: Marcel Le Picard
- Edited by: Robert Golden
- Production company: Astor Pictures
- Distributed by: Monogram Pictures
- Release date: November 7, 1941
- Running time: 62 minutes
- Country: United States
- Language: English

Zis Boom Bah, also known as College Sweethearts, is a 1941 American musical comedy film directed by William Nigh, and starring Grace Hayes, Peter Lind Hayes and Mary Healy. The plot concerns a vaudeville singer who comes to a floundering college to instill values and self-confidence in its entitled students.

== Plot ==
Grace Hayes—essentially playing herself—has been playing the vaudeville circuit to finance her son's college education after her wealthy family has shunned her.

Tiring of the road, she goes incognito to visit her son, Peter Kendricks (played by her real-life son Peter Lind Hayes) with her personal assistant Mary Healy (played by her real-life daughter-in-law of the same name).

She finds her son and the college "going to Hell in a hand basket", despite the earnest efforts of the kindhearted Dean, Prof. Warren (played by Richard "Skeets" Gallagher). The college and the old families are running out of money and spirit.

Grace buys the local diner, turns it into a version of her real-life club, and encourages the kids to put on a show to raise the funds and spirit the college needs to survive.

== Cast ==
- Grace Hayes as Grace Hayes
- Peter Lind Hayes as Peter Kendricks
- Mary Healy as Mary Healy
- Huntz Hall as Skeets Skillhorn
- Jan Wiley as Annabella
- Frank Elliott as Mr. Kendricks
- Richard "Skeets" Gallagher as Professor Warren
- Benny Rubin as Nick
- Eddie Kane as James J. Kane
- Leonard Sues as Noisey
- Roland Dupree as Pee Wee
- Betty Compson (uncredited)

== Soundtrack ==
- "Annabella" (by Johnny Lange and Lew Porter)
- "It Makes No Difference When You're in the Army" (by Johnny Lange and Lew Porter)
- "I've Learned to Smile Again" (by Neville Fleeson)
- "Good News Tomorrow" (by Neville Fleeson)
- "Put Your Trust in the Moon" (by Joan Baldwin and Charles R. Callender)
- "Miss America" (by Earl Hammand and Lee Ellon)

== Production ==
Grace Hayes was famous as a performer, and for opening the "movie stars' hang-out", Grace Hayes Lodge, and the chic Las Vegas nightclub, The Red Rooster.

Peter Lind Hayes and Mary Healy were married from 1940 until Hayes' death in 1998, and regularly worked together, notably on the film The 5,000 Fingers of Dr. T. (1953).

Katzman hired a musical troupe to perform numbers live to promote the film.
