= Mary Healy (entertainer) =

American actress (1918-2015)

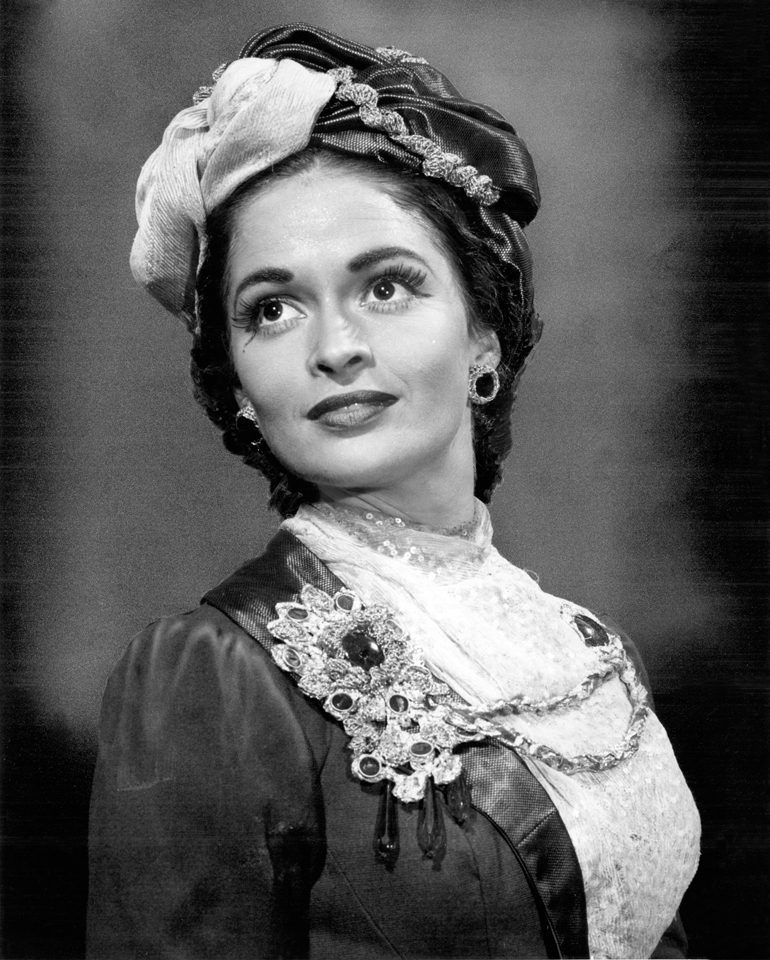
- Healy in the Orson Welles–Cole Porter extravanganza Around the World (1946)
- Born: April 14, 1918; New Orleans, Louisiana, U.S.
- Died: February 3, 2015 (aged 96); Calabasas, California, U.S.
- Occupations: Actress; singer
- Years active: 1937–1982
- Spouse: Peter Lind Hayes (m. 1940; d. 1998)
- Children: 2

Mary Sarah Healy (April 14, 1918 – February 3, 2015) was an American actress, singer, and variety entertainer.

She performed often with her husband, Peter Lind Hayes, for over 50 years, in a succession of films, television and radio shows and on the stage. She appeared in four Broadway shows between 1942 and 1958, and her film appearances include Second Fiddle, Star Dust and Theodore Geisel's musical fantasy The 5,000 Fingers of Dr. T. In 2006 she was inducted into the Nevada Entertainment/Artist Hall of Fame at the University of Nevada, Las Vegas.

== Biography ==
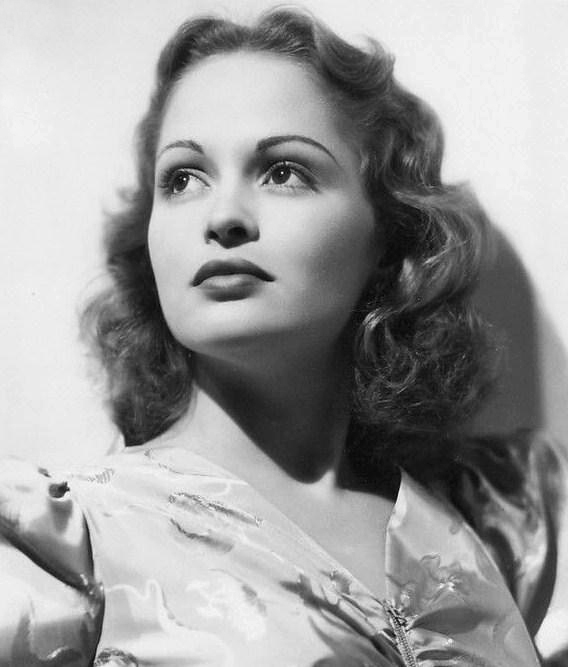
Healy in a 1939 publicity photo

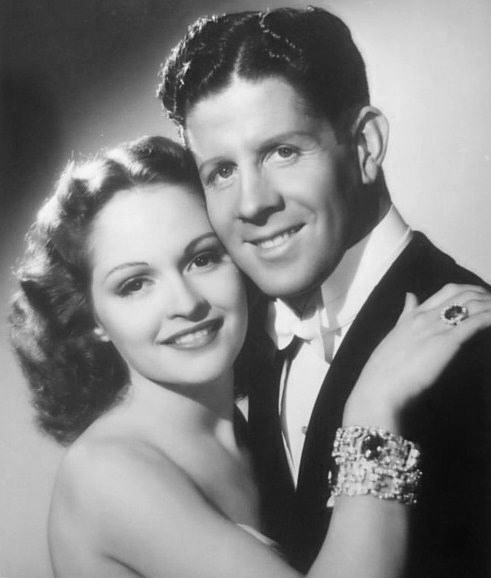
Healy and Rudy Vallee in Second Fiddle (1939)

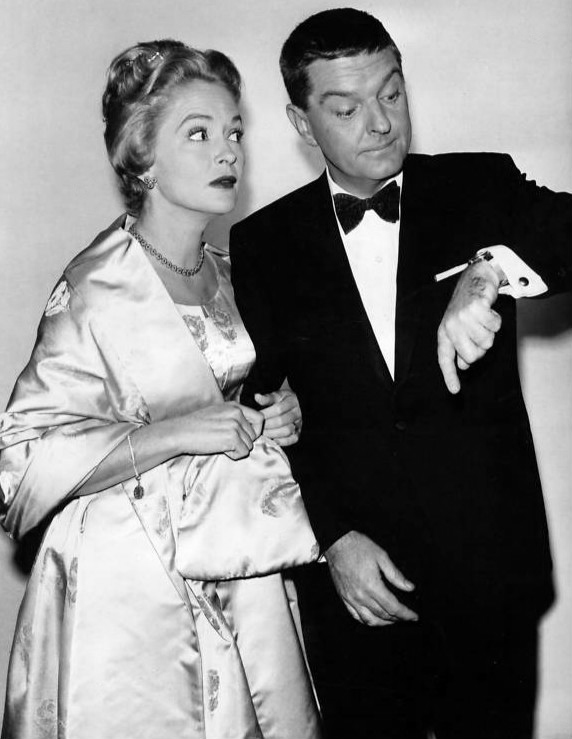
Healy and husband Peter Lind Hayes hosting The Tonight Show in 1962

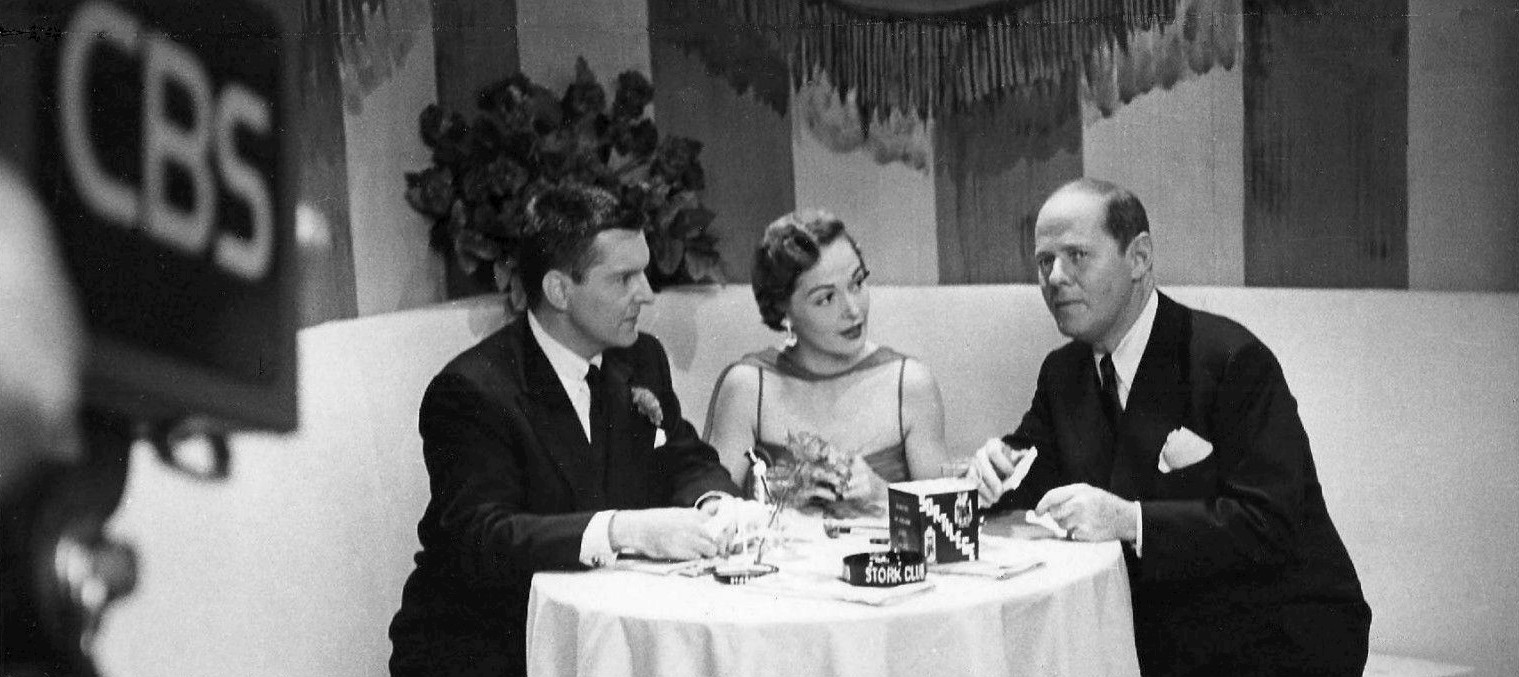
Hayes and Healy with nightclub owner Sherman Billingsley, promoting the 1950 debut of the CBS-TV talk show, The Stork Club

Healy was born April 14, 1918, in New Orleans. Crowned Miss New Orleans in 1935, she performed as a singer in the New Orleans area. She made her first screen appearance in the 1938 musical comedy Josette. In 1939 she had major film roles in Second Fiddle, and in Star Dust, where she sang the title song.

That year she met entertainer Peter Lind Hayes who, with his mother, vaudevillian Grace Hayes, was performing in North Hollywood. Healy and Hayes were married from 1940 until his death in 1998. With few exceptions, she and her husband worked together exclusively.

Healy made her stage debut in Count Me In (1942), opposite Charles Butterworth and Jean Arthur. She starred as Mrs. Aouda in Orson Welles's 1946 Broadway production of the musical Around the World in 80 Days, a role she reprised for The Mercury Summer Theatre of the Air radio adaptation.

Healy was a member of the regular cast of Hayes's CBS-TV series, Inside U.S.A. with Chevrolet (1949–50), a revue-style series that producer Arthur Schwartz based on his successful Broadway show, Inside U.S.A. Healy and Hayes were the first to sing the commercial jingle, "See the USA in Your Chevrolet", which later became a signature song for Dinah Shore.

Among the couple's other joint ventures on television were The Stork Club (1950), a CBS interview program; NBC's The Peter Lind Hayes Show (1950–51), a live situation comedy in which they played themselves on a set matching their actual New Rochelle home; the second season of the CBS variety show, Star of the Family (1951–1952); and the NBC sitcom Peter Loves Mary (1960–61), in which they played a show business couple with two children who are adjusting to suburban life. Healy and Hayes were among the substitute hosts of The Tonight Show in 1962, between Jack Paar's departure and Johnny Carson's arrival, and they were regular substitute hosts on Arthur Godfrey's TV programs. They were frequent guest panelists and once were the mystery guests on the long-running quiz show What's My Line? The couple were also celebrity contestants on the TV game show Password.

Healy and Hayes appeared in the cult fantasy film The 5,000 Fingers of Dr. T. (1953) and the Broadway comedy Who Was That Lady I Saw You With? (1958), written by Norman Krasna.

During the 1960s, they starred in a breakfast conversation show on New York radio station 710 WOR. WOR set up equipment in their house in suburban New Rochelle, New York, so that they could broadcast on weekday mornings from their home.

Over the years Healy and Hayes headlined on 14 occasions at the Sands Hotel in Las Vegas. The couple published a memoir, Twenty-Five Minutes from Broadway, in 1961. Healy self-published a second book, Moments to Remember with Peter and Mary — Our Life in Show Business from Vaudeville to Video, in 2004. In 2006 she was inducted into the Nevada Entertainment/Artist Hall of Fame at the University of Nevada, Las Vegas.

== Personal life ==
Healy and Hayes were the parents of two adopted children – a son, Peter Michael Hayes, and a daughter, actress Cathy Lind Hayes. Healy died of natural causes February 3, 2015, in Calabasas, California.

== Select filmography ==
Year	Title	Role	Notes
1938	Josette	Uncredited	Film debut
1938	Thanks for Everything	Uncredited	
1939	Second Fiddle	Jean Varick	
1939	20,000 Men a Year	Joan Marshall	
1939	Hotel for Women	Vocalist	
1940	Star Dust	Mary Andrews	
1940	He Married His Wife	Doris	
1941	Hard Guy	Julie Kavanaugh	
1941	Ride, Kelly, Ride	Entertainer	
1941	Zis Boom Bah	Mary Healy	With Peter Lind Hayes and his mother Grace Hayes
1942	Strictly in the Groove	Sally Monroe	
1942	The Yanks are Coming	Rita Edwards	
1953	The 5,000 Fingers of Dr. T.	Heloise Collins	With Peter Lind Hayes; co-written by Theodore Geisel
