= Sheila Bond =

American actress and singer (1927–2017)

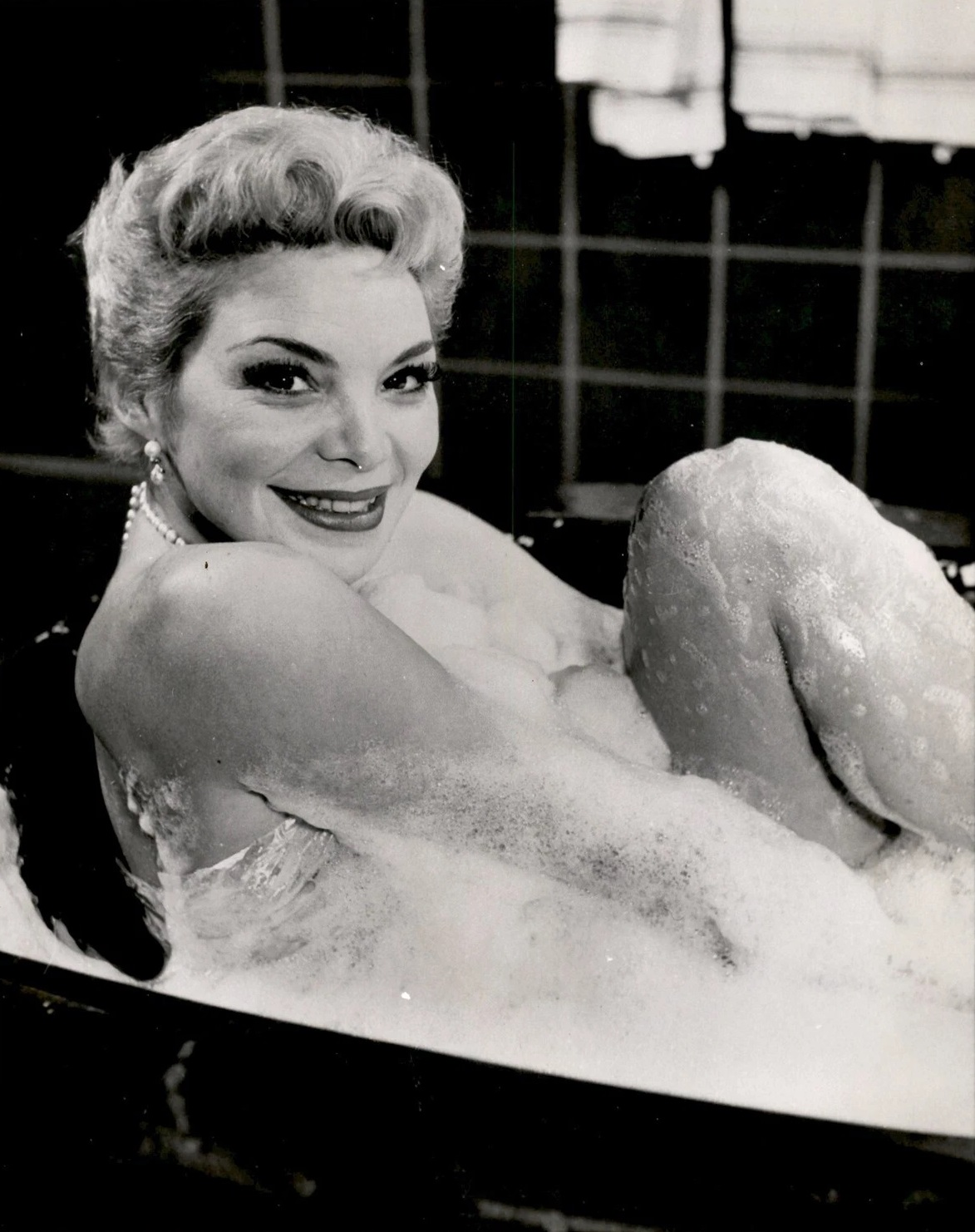
- Born: Sheila Phyllis Berman; March 16, 1927; New York City, U.S.
- Died: March 25, 2017 (aged 90); New York City, U.S.
- Occupations: Actress and singer
- Years active: 1944–1985
- Spouses: Leo Coff; Barton L. Goldberg (divorced)
- Children: 2
- Awards: Tony Award (1953)

Sheila Phyllis Bond (born Berman; March 16, 1927 - March 25, 2017) was an American actress and singer, known for her work on Broadway.

== Personal life ==
Bond was born Sheila Phyllis Berman in New York City of Jewish descent, and was educated at the Professional Children's School in New York City. She retired from show business. She was divorced from Barton L. Goldberg, with whom she had two children, Brad Goldberg and Lori Yarom. She had five grandchildren. She had a sister, Francine, currently married to singer Don Cherry. She divided her time between New York City and Boca Raton, Florida.

Bond married broker Leo Coff on March 20, 1948,

== Career ==
Bond became a professional dancer in the early 1940s. She debuted on Broadway in 1943 as a dancer in Artists and Models. She appeared in the revue, Make Mine Manhattan in 1948. Her film career began with playing the sister of Judy Holliday, whom Bond resembled, in The Marrying Kind in 1952. She is best known for her 1953 Tony Award-winning performance as Fay Fromkin in the original Broadway production of Wish You Were Here.

Bond's work on television included being the main dancer on Inside U.S.A. with Chevrolet, which led to her being featured in photographs about the program in an article in Life magazine. She also appeared on ABC Album, Appointment with Adventure, The Arthur Murray Party, The Colgate Comedy Hour, The Ed Sullivan Show, Four Star Revue, Frankie Laine Time, Playhouse 90, The Saturday Night Revue with Jack Carter, and The Texaco Star Theatre Starring Milton Berle.

== Death ==
On March 25, 2017, Bond died at her Manhattan home at the age of 90.
