= Inside U.S.A. with Chevrolet =

- Genre: Variety
- Directed by: Sherman Marks
- Presented by: Peter Lind Hayes; Mary Healy
- Country of origin: United States

Production
- Producer: Arthur Schwartz

Original release
- Network: CBS
- Release: September 29, 1949 – March 16, 1950

Inside U.S.A. With Chevrolet is an American television revue-style variety program that was broadcast on CBS September 29, 1949 – March 16, 1950. The program was not related to the book with that title but was loosely adapted from the Broadway revue of the previous year.

== Personnel ==
Peter Lind Hayes and his wife, Mary Healy, were co-hosts of Inside U.S.A. Mary Wickes, Sheila Bond and Marion Colby were regulars on the show, and Jay Blackton led the orchestra. The program was the first regular TV series for Hayes and Healy, and Wickes's role was her first on a live TV series.

Each episode featured a "star of the week". Those stars included Celeste Holm, Oscar Levant, Charles Boyer, Margaret O'Brien, Lucille Ball, Boris Karloff, Ethel Merman, and David Niven.

Producer Arthur Schwartz was also a Broadway songwriter, and he had composed the songs for the 1948-49 Broadway musical Inside U.S.A..

== Format ==
Hayes, "in the role of a contemporary minstrel", traveled across the United States, giving the audience information about the natural wonders of America and its people's diversity to complement each episode's songs, dances, and comedy sketches. Dancers performed large production numbers that viewers might have had trouble appreciating on the small TV screens of that time.

== Critical reception ==
Critic Jack Gould, in The New York Times, cited Inside U.S.A. as an example of the difficulty of adapting "the knowhow of Broadway" to television. He found that the program "fell far short" of the quality of the Admiral Broadway Revue, which had been on the air the previous season. Gould said that some segments tried to include too much material for visibility on a TV screen of that era, with the result that viewers could see only parts of production numbers rather than the numbers to their full extent. He also described one segment as "one gag stretched out to sketch length". Gould complimented Healy on her singing and Bond on her dancing.

A review in the trade publication Billboard had few positive comments about the program's November 10, 1949, episode. saying that only two segments of the show "offered any modicum of amusement". A dance number and a comedy tune received some praise, but the opening number was described as "a beat up old idea, clumsily done" and a sketch featuring guest star David Niven as a doctor was called "a direct insult". The review also panned a Chevrolet commercial in which a group of singers surrounded the car, making it "virtually invisible".

Reviewing the program's first two episodes, media critic John Crosby described Inside U.S.A. as "the closest thing to straight revue yet seen on television", and he praised the "wit, charm, and . . . high degree of organization". He complimented the show's satirical sketches except for one that featured O'Brien, who he said "seemed to think she was in a tragedy rather than a satiric revue sketch and played it accordingly to the paralyzed astonishment of the rest of the cast".

Television Magazine’s reviewer wrote “Among the many new shows opening this past month probably the biggest disappointment, at least in its first performance, was Chevrolet’s ‘Inside U.S.A.’ This in spite of having Peter Lind Hayes, one of the most personable and talented performers in the business.” The magazine also quoted from Harriet Van Horn’s New York World-Telegram review: “It’s a noisy, heavy-footed, highly-polished bore.”

== Production ==
An article in Life magazine described Inside U.S.A. as "the most ambitious and costliest (about $25,000) attempt yet by a Broadway showman . . . to apply Broadway techniques to a TV show". As the show's title indicates, Chevrolet was the sponsor. The trade publication Billboard said in 1949 that the talent budget was reported to be $25,000, with an additional $8,000 for the show's airtime. By March 1950, plans were under way to trim the budget. Billboard reported That Chevrolet had dropped its sponsorship, and that CBS had an option to sell a lower-cost package.

The program was performed in CBS Studio 52. It replaced the second half of 54th Street Revue, which moved to another night. (The Front Page debuted the same night, replacing the first half of 54th Street Revue.) It was broadcast from 8:30 to 9 p.m. Eastern Time on Thursdays, alternating initially with Sugar Hill Times and later with Romance. CBS officials wanted the program to be broadcast weekly, but the costs involved caused executives at Chevrolet to agree to only alternate weeks.

Arthur Schwartz was the producer, Sherman Marks was the director, and Paul Godkin was the choreographer. Writers of sketches and music used on the program included Franklin P. Adams, Marc Connelly, Howard Dietz, Corey Ford, Ira Gershwin, Oscar Hammerstein II, and Moss Hart.
