= Marianne Stewart =

German-American actress

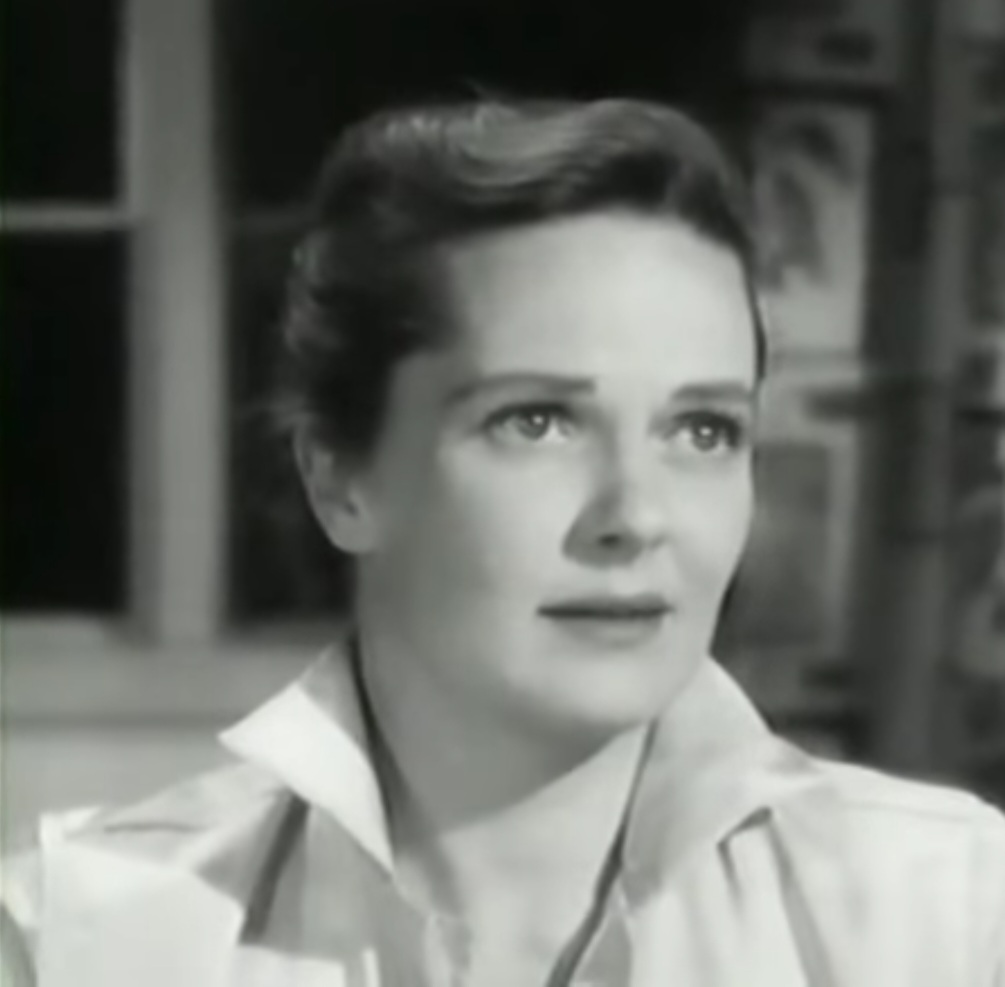
- Stewart in Time Table (1956)
- Born: Annemarie Schünzel; 16 January 1922; Berlin, Germany
- Died: 1 November 1992 (aged 70); Los Angeles, California, U.S.
- Other names: Ann Loring; Ann Sheldon (Note: A likely explanation for Schünzel's pre-Stewart metamorphosis from Loring to Sheldon was the sudden and unexpected reemergence, less than 2 weeks prior to Escape's release, of an MGM alumnus of relatively recent vintage likewise named Ann Loring. This was due to the latter's much-publicized marriage to actor Herbert Rudley.); Annemarie Stewart; Anna Maria Stewart
- Occupation: Actress
- Years active: 1943–1965
- Spouse(s): Louis Calhern (m. 1946; div. 1955) Wilbur George Dirksing (m. 19??)
- Parents: Reinhold Schünzel (father); Hanne Brinkmann (mother)

Marianne Stewart (born Annemarie Schünzel; 16 January 1922 – 1 November 1992) was a German-born American stage, film and television actress.

== Early life ==
Stewart was born Annemarie Schünzel in Berlin, Germany on 16 January 1922 to Hanne Brinkmann and Reinhold Schünzel. In 1937, she and her father emigrated to the United States, where she attended Beverly Hills High School, graduating in 1940.

== Career ==
On 1 November 1940, Stewart made her uncredited screen debut in MGM's Escape, her first credited appearance coming 2 years later in Valley of Hunted Men.

Stewart's Broadway debut came on 23 October 1944, when she replaced Annabella in Elia Kazan's production of Jacobowsky and the Colonel, opposite Oscar Karlweis and Louis Calhern. The following fall, Kazan cast Stewart, along with Edmund Gwenn and Montgomery Clift, in his staging of You Touched Me, Tennessee Williams' and Donald Windham's adaptation of the same-named D.H. Lawrence short story.

In 1946 Stewart was a member of the Summer stock cast at Elitch Theatre, the oldest Summer stock theater.

Stewart was married to her erstwhile leading man, Louis Calhern, from 1946 to 1955, and later to Wilbur George Dirksing until her death. Stewart died of cancer on 10 May 1992, in Los Angeles, California, at the age of 70.

== Filmography ==
=== Film ===
Year	Title	Role	Notes
1940	Escape	Helene - a student	Uncredited
1940	Four Sons	Peasant girl	Uncredited
1942	Valley of Hunted Men	Laura Steiner	Credited as Anna Marie Stewart
1943	Three Russian Girls	Olga	Credited as Anna Marie Stewart
1944	The Canterville Ghost	Buxom Lass at Party	Uncredited
1944	Mrs. Parkington	French maid	Uncredited
1946	Our Hearts Were Growing Up	Lowell schoolgirl	Uncredited
1950	Right Cross	Audrey	
1956	Time Table	Ruth Norman	
1957	Hot Summer Night	Ruth Childers	
1957	Back from the Dead	Nancy Cordell	
1959	The Big Fisherman	Ione	
1960	The Facts of Life	Connie Mason	
1964	Hush... Hush, Sweet Charlotte	Town Gossip	

=== Television ===
Year	Title	Role
1951	Danger (TV series; one episode – 1951, 2 January)	Not available
1954	The Danny Thomas Show (TV series; two episodes – 1954, 23 February and 2 March)	Grace
1954	Henry Fonda Presents (TV series; one episode, "A Matter of Courage" – 1954, 28 August)	Not Available
1955	The Star and the Story (TV series; one episode – 1955, 2 January)	Bess
1956-58	Schlitz Playhouse (TV series; four episodes, "The Finger of God," "Officer Needs Help," "The Big Payoff" and "A Thing to Fight For" – 1956, 30 March, 18 May, 28 December; 1958, 26 September)	Jacoba Dewet, NA, Mary, Eleanor Searcy
1956	Big Town (TV series; one episode – 1956, 10 April)	Edith Miller
1956	Medic (TV series; one episode, "The Inconstant Heart" – 1956, 23 April)	Dot Forbes
1956	Crusader (TV series; one episode, "The Farm" – 1956, 22 June)	Erna
1956	Soldiers of Fortune (TV series; one episode, "Doubled in Diamonds" – 1956, 25 November)	Gretchen Van Loon
1956–1957	General Electric Theater (TV series; three episodes, "The Pot of Gold," "The Charlatan" and "Angel of Wrath" – 1956, 7 October and 11 November; 1957, 5 May)	Alice, Mrs. Mikelson, Phyllis
1957	Gunsmoke (TV series; one episode, "Gone Straight" – 1957, 9 February)	Mrs. Timble
1957	The Millionaire (TV series; one episode, "The Jerry Patterson Story" – 1957, 6 March)	Jan Patterson
1957	NBC Matinee Theater (TV series; one episode, "The Starmaster" – 1957, 17 May)	Patricia
1957	The Web (TV series; one episode, "Kill and Run" – 1957, 11 August)	Mrs. Lanham
1957	O. Henry Playhouse (TV series; one episode, "The Lonely Man" – 1957, 14 September)	NA
1957	Alfred Hitchcock Presents (Season 3 Episode 3: "The Perfect Crime") (aired 20 October)	Alice West
1957	Dr. Hudson's Secret Journal (TV series; one episode, "Class Reunion" – 1957, 20 October)	NA
1958-59	The Thin Man (TV series; two episodes, "The Tennis Champ" and "Gory Road" – 1958, 11 April; 1959, 3 April)	Beth Harvey, Sheila Van Dyke
1958	Alcoa Theatre (TV series; one episode, "The Clock Struck Twelve" – 1958, 2 June)	Wife (uncredited)
1958	Zane Grey Theatre (TV series; one episode, "The Accuser" – 1957, 20 October)	Polly Merrick
1959	The Lineup (TV series; two episodes, "The Boylston Billing Case" and "The Hamilton Harker Case" – 1959, 23 January, 6 February)	Carmen Billing, NA
1959	Buckskin (TV series; one episode, "Who Killed Pat Devlin?" – 1959, 16 February)	Vanessa Devlin
1959	Philip Marlowe (TV series; one episode, "Prescription for Murder" – 1959, 20 October)	Ann Vincent
1959	The Man from Blackhawk (TV series; one episode, "The Gypsy Story" – 1957, 20 October)	Molly Davenant
1959	Bachelor Father (TV series; one episode, "Bentley's Double Play" – 1957, 20 October)	Miss Gunther
1959	Mike Hammer (TV series; one episode, "I Ain't Talkin'" – 1957, 20 October)	Myra Robbins
1960	Bonanza (One episode, "A House Divided" – 1960, 16 January)	Lily Van Cleet Kyle
1960	Manhunt (One episode, "The Ice Caper" – 1960, 14 April)	Ellen
1960	Dante (One episode, "One for the Birds" – 1960, 3 October)	Veronica Mizell
1960	Peter Loves Mary (One episode, "Make a Million" – 1960, 2 November)	Mrs. Crawford
1960	Michael Shayne (One episode, "Murder plays Charades" – 1960, 9 December)	Emily Tallen
1959-61	Perry Mason (Three episodes, "The Case of the Bedeviled Doctor," "The Case of the Spurious Sister" and "The Case of the Wintry Wife" – 1959, 4 April, 3 October; 1961, 18 February)	Edith Douglas, Helen Sprague, Phyllis Hudson
1961	Route 66 (One episode, "Sleep on Four Pillows" – 1961, 24 February)	Marva Emerson
1961	The Asphalt Jungle (One episode, "The Lay and the Lawyer" – 1961, 9 April)	Rose Wardell
1961	Whispering Smith (One episode, "The Mortal Coil" – 1961, 24 July)	Sarah Denton
1961	Shotgun Slade (One episode, "Skinner's Rainbow" – 1961, 24 April)	Kate Murdock
1962	Ben Casey (two episodes, "A Story to be Softly Told" and "Pick Up All My Care and Woe" – 1962, 22 January, 17 December)	Miss Masterson, Ruth Shipley
1962	Straightaway (one episode, "Escape from Darkness" – 1962, 14 February)	NA
1963	Arrest and Trial (One episode, "A Shield Is For Hiding Behind" – 1963, 6 October)	Eileen Palmer
1965	My Living Doll (One episode, "The Kleptomaniac" – 1960, 16 January)	Salesgirl #2
