= Norman Frank =

American politician (1925–2007)

Norman Joseph Fetbrod (February 18, 1925 – 11 May 2007), better known by his professional name Norman Frank, was an American public relations executive and politician who helped the Patrolmen's Benevolent Association (PBA) defeat a civilian complaint review board proposed by New York City Mayor John V. Lindsay. Frank was chief strategist for PBA president John Cassese.

Born in Manhattan, Frank worked as a law clerk after high school, then attended Michigan State University before joining the United States Army Air Corps during World War II. He worked in advertising upon return and was a producer and director of Star of the Family which ran on CBS from 1950 to 1952. He was a producer for the documentary series Wide Wide World and a producer and director of The Jonathan Winters Show.

Prior to his unsuccessful bid for his party's mayoral nomination, Frank said about Mayor Lindsay, "He's the most popular mayor in the world — outside of New York."

It took until 1992 for an independent review board to be created during the administration of Mayor David Dinkins. Frank died in Miami, Florida.
