= Star of the Family (TV series) =

American television series (1950-52)

- Genre: Variety
- Directed by: Norman Frank
- Presented by: Morton Downey (1950–1951); Peter Lind Hayes with Mary Healy (1951–1952); Frank Waldecker (announcer)
- Opening theme: Buddy Kaye
- Composer: Carl Hoff
- Country of origin: United States
- Original language: English
- No. of seasons: 2
- No. of episodes: 75

Production
- Executive producers: Perry Lafferty; Coby Ruskin
- Camera setup: Multi-camera
- Running time: 25 minutes

Original release
- Network: CBS Television
- Release: 22 September 1950 – 26 June 1952

Star of the Family is a CBS Television program which premiered on September 22, 1950, and aired until June 26, 1952.

== Overview ==
The first season featured people who might be related to a celebrity, and the show contestants tried to guess the name of the celebrity. The celebrity was then brought out to entertain the audience. In the second season, the show became a musical comedy show.

== Personnel ==
Hosts included Morton Downey (1950–1951) and Peter Lind Hayes with Mary Healy (1951–1952).

The series was directed by Norman Frank, produced by Perry Lafferty and Coby Ruskin, and written by Adrian Spies. Music was by Carl Hoff and His Orchestra, with the Beatrice Kroft Dancers also featured. Some episodes were directed by John Wray.

== Production history ==
The show aired in these time slots:

- (22 September 1950 – 15 June 1951) Fridays 10-10:30 pm ET
- (29 July 1951 – 6 January 1952) Sundays 6:30-7pm ET
- (10 January 1952 – 26 June 1952) Thursdays 8-8:30pm ET Beginning with the January 10, 1952, episode, the show alternated with The George Burns and Gracie Allen Show.

The show was sponsored by Kelvinator.

== Episode status ==
One of the few surviving episodes is available online at TV4U. This is the December 9, 1951 episode, hosted by Hayes and Healy, and featuring Duke Ellington, Gloria LeRoy, and Andy Russell.

== Critical response ==
A review in the trade publication Billboard called an episode of the first version of the program "a stilted, slow-paced show brightened only intermittently when the 'stars' themselves perform". The review said that some of the interviews "were self-conscious and dull". A subsequent Billboard review complimented Healy's singing and mimicry talents and said that Hayes's "gags were adequate, if corny".

== See also ==
- 1950-51 United States network television schedule
- 1951-52 United States network television schedule
