= Perry Lafferty =

American television producer (1917–2005)

Perry Francis Lafferty (October 3, 1917 – August 25, 2005) was an American television producer and network television executive who produced several television programs, including the CBS programs All in the Family, M*A*S*H, Maude and The Mary Tyler Moore Show. With NBC, he produced the 1985 television movie An Early Frost, one of the first dramatic films to deal with the subject of HIV/AIDS.

== Early years ==
Lafferty was born in Davenport, Iowa on October 3, 1917. He graduated from Davenport Central High School in 1935 and was inducted into the school's Hall of Honor in 2009. He graduated from the Yale School of Music and was trained in piano.

When he was 12 years old, Lafferty began playing piano on Saturdays on radio station WKBF in Rock Island, Illinois.

During World War II, Lafferty served in the U.S. Army Air Force.

== Career ==
In the early 1940s, Lafferty began working in the radio industry in New York City as a director and producer.

He was hired by CBS in 1965 as the network's West Coast programming department, leaving in 1976. He was hired by NBC in 1979 as its senior vice president of West Coast programs and talent, and was later assigned responsibility for the network's movies and mini-series. In that role, he developed and produced the 1985 made-for-television production of An Early Frost, starring Aidan Quinn as a young man who must let his parents, played by Ben Gazzara and Gena Rowlands, know that he was dying of AIDS. The critically acclaimed film won a Peabody Award and was one of the first network dramatic features to tackle the HIV /AIDS issue.

He also worked on such television series as Star of the Family, The Danny Kaye Show, Robert Montgomery Presents, Studio One, and The Waltons.

== Later years ==
After he retired from working in television, Lafferty became a writer of mystery novels, including Jablonski of L.A. (1999) and The Downing of Flight Six Heavy (1992).

== Death ==
Lafferty died at age 87 on August 25, 2005 at his home in Century City, California due to prostate cancer. He was interred in Westwood Village Memorial Park Cemetery. His 1943 marriage to the former Frances Carden, who had been a radio actress, ended with her death in 1999. Lafferty was survived by a daughter, a son and two grandchildren.
