= Ellis Brooks Auto Center =

Ellis Brooks Auto Center is an automobile dealership in San Francisco, California. It is best known for its commercials, featuring an adaptation of See the USA in Your Chevrolet. Originally Ellis Brooks Chevrolet, the company later became "Auto Center" after it began marketing other brands of automobile. The company is now located at 1565 Bush Street, but the original Ellis Brooks sign is still used. The company was founded in 1939.

== Background ==
The dealership located on Van Ness Street and Bush Avenue had been a fixture there for decades up to the late 2000s. It was founded in 1939. In 1952, it began selling new Chevrolet cars. Marie Brooks took over the company after her husband succumbed to an illness.

=== The early years ===
In the 1930s, possibly around 1936, Ellis Brooks started out with his partner Louis Cuneo. Their dealership called Brooks & Cuneo was located on 815 Van Ness Avenue and 74 12th street. Brooks was a REO dealer and then later a Hudson dealer. Around 1950, Ellis' San Francisco based Hudson HQ had Dan Albee on staff as assistant sales manager. Tony Mistlin who started there in 1948 and who would eventually work his way up to sales manager would eventually start out on his own and in later years end up with largest Honda dealership in Northern California.

=== The cessation of selling new cars ===
It was announced in November 23, 2008 edition of American City Business Journals that of the 15th of December that year, the dealership would stop selling new cars. This would mean that 45 people who worked in the parts and service departments would lose their jobs. Two reasons given were the rise in cost of doing business in San Francisco and a union pension fund which was said to be a burden. The president of the dealership at the time was Marie Brooks. She said that economic challenges were difficult for domestic-automobile dealers.

=== Later years ===
In February 2010, Wheego Electric Cars announced that it signed Ellis Brooks Auto Center as its dealer. The dealership had been given exclusive rights to exclusive sell the Wheego Electric Cars throughout California's San Francisco Bay Area. Other areas included San Mateo, Santa Cruz etc. In 2011, the company moved to its new location at 1565 Bush Street, San Francisco, California. By 2012, the site was a combined Nissan and Infiniti dealership. For years the building's owner Marie Brooks resisted offers but eventually made a deal with Roger Penske. In February 2013, while the center was looking to celebrate their 75th anniversary that year, they were getting phone calls intended for Nunavut Arctic College. This came about as a result of the college having the phone number on their website listed incorrectly. The following morning the error was corrected.

The original street corner now features auto dealerships and cafes among other buildings. The main facility specializes in used cars

== Staff ==
- John Brooks - General Manager - 2010
- Arthur Brooks (Born July 25, 1961, Died August 17, 2012) - Production Manager
