= Star Dust (film) =

1940 film by Walter Lang

- Theatrical release poster
- Directed by: Walter Lang
- Screenplay by: Helen Logan; Robert Ellis
- Based on: Jesse Malo; Kenneth Earl; Ivan Kahn (based on a story by)
- Produced by: Kenneth Macgowan; Darryl F. Zanuck
- Starring: Linda Darnell; John Payne; Roland Young; Charlotte Greenwood
- Cinematography: J. Peverell Marley
- Edited by: Robert L. Simpson
- Music by: David Buttolph
- Color process: Black and white
- Production company: 20th Century Fox
- Distributed by: 20th Century Fox
- Release date: April 6, 1940
- Running time: 86 minutes
- Country: United States
- Language: English

Star Dust is a 1940 American comedy drama film directed by Walter Lang and starring Linda Darnell and John Payne, Roland Young and Charlotte Greenwood.

== Plot ==
Amalgamated Pictures is seeking new stars for its motion pictures. Talent scout Thomas Brooke hits the road, looking for newcomers to bring back for screen tests, hopefully to impress the studio's boss, Dane Wharton.

Brooke discovers a football player in Arizona who can sing, Bud Borden, and a talented Texas singer, Mary Andrews. On a visit to Arkansas, his presence is discovered by aspiring actress Carolyn Sayres, who schemes to get Brooke to take an interest in her. He does, at least until he finds out she is still a bit too young.

Everyone travels to Hollywood for screen tests and a visit to Grauman's Chinese Theatre, where they get a kick out of the footprints of movie stars immortalized in cement. Brooke encounters the casting director's own new find, June Lawrence, a singer. He clashes with the studio, which offers a contract only to Mary and sends his other discoveries home.

Carolyn does not take no for an answer and comes back. Brooke now gets in her corner and schemes to insert footage from her screen test into a theater's newsreel. The next thing they all know, not only is Carolyn a star, Grauman's is inviting her to be immortalized in cement.

== Cast ==
- Linda Darnell as Carolyn Sayres
- John Payne as Ambrose Fillmore / Bud Borden
- Roland Young as Thomas Brooke
- Charlotte Greenwood as Lola Langdon
- William Gargan as Dane Wharton
- Mary Beth Hughes as June Lawrence
- Mary Healy as Mary Andrews
- Donald Meek as Sam Wellman
- Jessie Ralph as Aunt Martha Parker
- Walter Kingsford as Napoleon in Screen Test
- George Montgomery as Ronnie
- Robert Lowery as Bellboy
- Hal K. Dawson as Cargo
- Jody Gilbert as Swedish Maid
- Gary Breckner as Announcer
- Paul Hurst as Mac, Amalgamated Lab Tech
- Irving Bacon as Jefferson Hotel Desk Clerk
- Billy Wayne as Amalgamated Cameraman
- Fern Emmett as Hotel Stenographer
- Lynne Roberts as College Girl
