= Time Table (film) =

1956 film by Mark Stevens

Time Table (Note: The film's theatrical poster presents the title as one word, but it is displayed as two words on the film's title screen.)
- Theatrical release poster
- Directed by: Mark Stevens
- Screenplay by: Aben Kandel
- Story by: Robert Angus
- Produced by: Mark Stevens
- Starring: Mark Stevens; King Calder; Felicia Farr; Marianne Stewart
- Cinematography: Charles Van Enger
- Edited by: Kenneth G. Crane
- Music by: Walter Scharf
- Production company: Mark Stevens Productions
- Distributed by: United Artists
- Release date: February 8, 1956 (United States)
- Running time: 80 minutes
- Country: United States
- Language: English

Time Table is a 1956 American film noir crime film produced and directed by Mark Stevens, who also stars as the lead character. The film includes early appearances by Jack Klugman and Felicia Farr. Other cast members include King Calder and Marianne Stewart. The film was distributed by United Artists.

== Plot ==
Paul Bruckner, a surgeon whose license has been revoked for alcoholism, poses as Dr. Sloane aboard a train passing through Arizona. His presence there is part of a caper involving a fictitious patient, on whose behalf he gains access to his physician's bag in the baggage car. There he blows the safe and steals a cash payroll of $500,000. Bruckner and the false patient, supposedly infected with polio, disembark at a remote small town with a hospital, which is also far from any scheduled train stop, and escape with the money in an ambulance. The railroad officials do not discover the robbery until the train reaches Phoenix many hours later.

In response, the insurance company assigns claim investigator Charlie Norman to the case, forcing him to postpone his vacation to Mexico with his wife Ruth the next day. Joe Armstrong, a veteran railroad policeman who is also investigating the crime, works with him. Gradually, evidence starts to surface indicating that the thieves stole the ambulance just before the robbery, then ditched it in the desert, escaping in a stolen helicopter. The scheme was elaborate, showing that the robbery had been executed according to a strict timetable.

However, the thieves committed one misstep that kept the heist from being the perfect crime. During the escape, the thief named Lombard who played the role of the patient accidentally shot himself, forcing Bruckner—and the money—to remain with him instead of escaping to Mexico, disrupting the timetable. Charlie's assignment to the case further complicates matters.

However, Charlie is the secret mastermind behind the plot. He carefully planned the crime after meeting Bruckner, who filed a false accident claim. Charlie plans to disappear in Mexico with Bruckner's wife Linda, who pretended to be Lombard's wife, and use the cash to finance his new life. Bruckner, desperate for money, joined in the crime strictly for the cash.

Charlie decides that they should all wait for the investigation to cool before trying to continue on to Mexico. However, Joe, methodically investigating each aspect of the crime, finds an accomplice who leads to another, Wolfe, the owner of the "stolen" helicopter. Charlie realizes that Bruckner and Wolfe double-crossed him, killed Lombard and planned to keep the money for themselves. Charlie kills Wolfe to silence him and makes it appear to be a suicide. Bruckner, trying to escape to Mexico with Linda and his share of the loot, panics during a routine customs check and tries to force his way across the border, but is killed by police. Linda escapes, and Joe arranges to accompany Charlie to Mexico to find her, believing that she has the rest of the loot.

Charlie sees an opportunity to escape and stashes his cut of the money in a briefcase to smuggle into Mexico. He suspects Bruckner had already arranged to leave Mexico for another country with Linda. Charlie also discovers that an unsuspecting Ruth has tried to pull a practical joke on him by substituting fishing gear for his work reports in the briefcase. She has discovered the stolen money and returned it anonymously to the insurance company. While pursuing Linda to take Bruckner's place in the double-cross plan, Charlie draws the suspicion of Joe and the Mexican police. Forced to abandon Bruckner's plan, Charlie and Linda are cornered and killed in a shootout.

== Cast ==
- Mark Stevens as Charlie Norman
- King Calder as Joe Armstrong
- Felicia Farr as Linda Bruckner
- Marianne Stewart as Ruth Norman
- Wesley Addy as Dr. Paul Bruckner
- Alan Reed as Al Wolfe
- Rodolfo Hoyos Jr. as Lt. Castro
- Jack Klugman as Frankie Page
- John Marley as Bobik

== Reception ==
In a contemporary review for The New York Times, critic Milton Esterow wrote: "The latest Hollywood triple-threat is Mark Stevens, the gentleman currently portraying one of television's crusading editors. ... Mr. Stevens has shed his video zealousness against evil and become an insurance investigator on the wrong side of the law, the mastermind of a $500,000 train robbery and a ruthless killer. His transformation is a credit to his versatility. He comes off pretty well, even if 'Timetable' doesn't. ... Also, Mr. Stevens is thoroughly grim. Too grim. Perhaps it's the TV influence. Anyway, give us a smile once in a while, old boy, things aren't as bad as all that."

== See also ==
- List of American films of 1956
- List of films in the public domain in the United States
