= Timmie Rogers =

American singer-songwriter

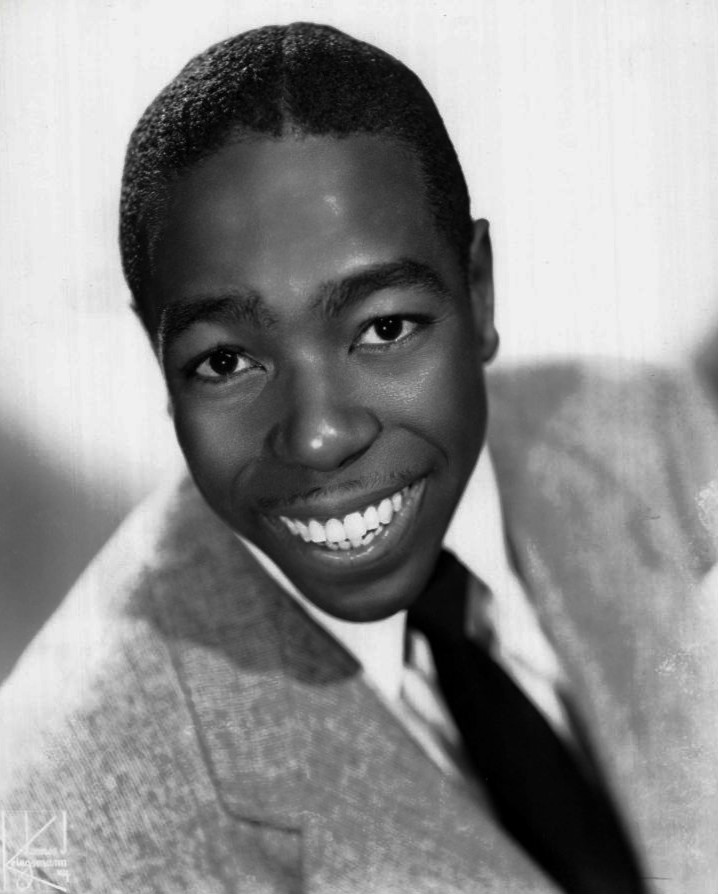
- Born: Timothy Louis Ancrum; July 4, 1915; Detroit, Michigan, U.S.
- Died: December 17, 2006 (aged 91); Los Angeles, California, U.S.
- Other name: Timmie Rodgers
- Occupations: Comedian; singer-songwriter; bandleader; actor
- Years active: 1927–1993
- Children: 2

Timmie Rogers (born Timothy Louis Ancrum July 4, 1915 – December 17, 2006) was an American comedian, singer-songwriter, bandleader and actor who appeared on many national TV shows in the 1960s and 1970s. Rogers was one of the first Black comedians allowed to directly address a white audience when he worked. Before Rogers, African-American funny men had to either work in pairs or groups, only conversing with each other, and they had to play a character, while popular white comedians, such as Bob Hope and Jack Benny got to play themselves. Rogers worked by himself, always dressed well, often wearing a tuxedo, and never wore blackface.

His humor was clean, topical, and political. Rogers was inducted into the National Comedy Hall of Fame in 1993, and is often called the Jackie Robinson of comedy, because he opened the door for other performers such as Dick Gregory and Bill Cosby.

As a singer, he often accompanied himself on a distinctive 10-stringed stringed instrument called a Martin tiple, including a 1975 television performance in a musical duet with Redd Foxx on the Sanford and Son series, playing a character named "Smiley Rogers."

== Early life ==
Timmie Rogers was born in Detroit to Lillian Ancrum. At the age of eight, he was earning money by dancing on the street. At the age of 12, Rogers ran away from home and found a job as a dishwasher on a boat, where he learned the languages of the cooks; eventually, he spoke nine. Rogers later wrote and recorded in French and German. Later he cleaned ashtrays at a local ballroom, absorbed what he saw and was invited to dance onstage before acts. By 1932, Rogers was part of a successful dance team, Timmie & Freddie, that performed on the vaudeville circuit. They split in 1944 as blacks across the country were developing a collective voice in the name of civil rights, and Rogers decided to try it on his own, his way.

== Career ==
He was known as the Unknown Pioneer of (Black) Comedy. He insisted on not wearing blackface when performing his comedy act and stood firm with his conviction. His catchphrase was "Oh Yeah!" and it was a part of his act for over 50 years. Rogers starred in US television's first black prime-time show Uptown Jubilee on CBS Television in 1949.

He was also a recurring guest star on The Jackie Gleason Show for over 12 years, and continued to work with Gleason for the next thirty years. Rogers later credited Gleason for giving him national exposure which helped his career. Rogers also wrote music including "If You Can’t Smile and Say Yes", a song recorded by Nat King Cole. He also wrote songs for Carmen McRae and Sarah Vaughan. In the late 1950s and living in Philadelphia, he recorded on Cameo and Parkway Records. His hits included "Back to School Again" and "I Love Ya, I Love Ya, I Love Ya".

== Death ==
On December 17, 2006, Rogers died of undisclosed causes in Los Angeles at the age of 91.
