= Grace Hayes =

American actress and singer

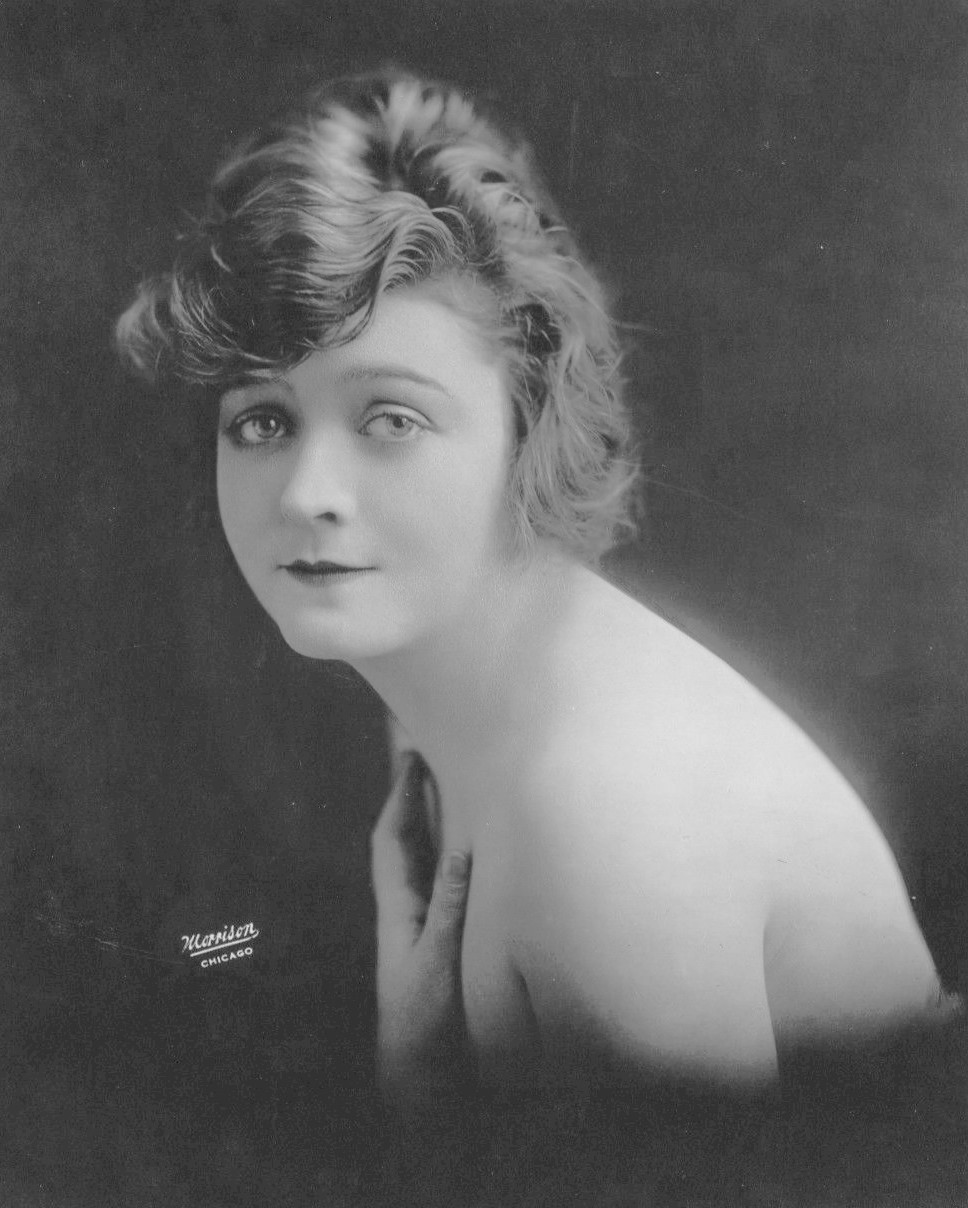
- Hayes, c. 1918
- Born: August 3, 1895; Springfield, Missouri, U.S.
- Died: February 1, 1989 (aged 93); Las Vegas, Nevada, U.S.
- Occupations: Actor; singer
- Spouses: Joseph Lind; Charlie Foy; Robert Evans Hopkins
- Children: Peter Lind Hayes

Grace Hayes (August 3, 1895 – February 1, 1989) was an American actress, singer, vaudeville entertainer and nightclub owner.

Hayes owned the Grace Hayes Lodge in the San Fernando Valley in Los Angeles, California, and later the Las Vegas nightclub, the Red Rooster which she renamed the Grace Hayes Lodge. She is the mother of Peter Lind Hayes and mother-in-law to Mary Healy. She appeared in Zis Boom Bah (1941) in which she played herself, her son and daughter-in-law also appeared in the film; as well as other films. Hayes also appeared on Broadway.

== Early life ==
Hayes was born in Springfield, Missouri, but moved to California when she was ten years old. She married Joseph Lind Sr. in 1912, when she was 17. In 1915 their son, Joseph Conrad Lind was born, later he became known as Peter Lind Hayes. In 1917, Lind Sr. died. After Lind's death, Hayes married Charlie Foy and later Robert Evans Hopkins.

== Career ==
Hayes began singing in nightclubs when she was fourteen years old. She teamed up with Neville Fleeson and performed at The Palace in New York, and later added her son, Peter Lind Hayes, to the act. She appeared in many Broadway shows including A Night in Spain.

Hayes opened a nightclub called the Grace Hayes Lodge in Los Angeles, CA. Hayes moved to Las Vegas, Nevada in 1947, where she purchased the Red Rooster and later renamed it as the Grace Hayes Lodge.

== Retirement and later years ==
After the closure of Grace Hayes Lodge in Las Vegas in 1957, Hayes remained living in a home on the property which became the last private residence on the Las Vegas Strip. She lived there until 1987 when Steve Wynn and Golden Nugget Inc. purchased the property to use for the construction of The Mirage.

== Filmography ==
=== Film ===
Year	Title	Role	Notes
1929	Grace Hayes and Neville Fleeson in 'Diamond Til' (Short)	Diamond Til/Singer	Film Debut
1930	King of Jazz	Third Reporter ('Ladies of the Press') / Rough Wife ('Do Things for You')	
1933	Hello Pop (Short)	Miss Hayes	
1933	Myrt and Marge	Grace	
1933	Rainbow Over Broadway	Trixie Valleron	
1936	Maid for a Day (Short)	Grace Hayden	
1939	Babes in Arms	Florrie Moran	
1941	Zis Boom Bah	Grace Hayes	
1942	When Johnnie Comes Marching Home	Orchestra Violinist	
1949	Always Leave Them Laughing	Mrs. Gracie Kennedy Washburn	
1950	Cage	Mugging Matron	

=== Theatre ===
Year	Title
1922-23	The Bunch and Judy
1926	The Merry World
1927	A Night in Spain
1930-31	Ballyhoo of 1930
1932	A Little Racketeer
