= The Peter Lind Hayes Show =

American radio and TV series

The Peter Lind Hayes Show is the title of two American television shows and one American radio program. One TV show was a situation comedy broadcast in prime time on NBC in 1950-1951. The other was a daytime variety program on ABC in 1958-1959. The radio program was a weekly variety show on CBS in 1954-1955.

== NBC-TV ==
The Peter Lind Hayes Show
- Genre: Sitcom
- Starring: Peter Lind Hayes; Mary Healy

Original release
- Network: NBC
- Release: November 23, 1950 – March 29, 1951

=== Format ===
Peter Lind Hayes and Mary Healy played themselves on a set that resembled their own home. Healy said, "We all felt we were taking part in something new and exciting. A lot of people were afraid to be on TV." Each episode featured a guest star and began with the star explaining in a phone call that a previous commitment for dinner with Hayes and Healy meant that he or she was unable to have dinner with the unseen person on the other end of the call. The guest then went to the Hayes house, where he or she performed during the episode.

Mary Wickes portrayed the housekeeper. Claude Stroud had the role of "an unemployed comedian who had come for a visit and become a permanent member of the household." Wickes's and Stroud's roles ended with the December 28, 1950, episode. Guest stars on the program included Gloria Swanson, Hal Le Roy, Edmond O'Brien, Olga San Juan, and Charles Boyer.

=== Production ===
The program ran from November 23, 1950, until March 29, 1951. It was broadcast live on Thursdays from 8 to 8:30 p.m. Eastern Time. It debuted as The Peter and Mary Show; on December 14, 1950, the title became The Peter Lind Hayes Show. The sponsor was Borden's Instant Coffee. It was replaced by Treasury Men in Action.

=== Critical response ===
June Bundy reviewed the program's March 8, 1951, episode in the trade publication Billboard, pointing out that the show had evolved from a "somewhat shakily constructed" program in its debut to be "in fine form". The review complimented Hayes's comedy sketches, Healy's performances in comedy and music, and their combined efforts in "a devastating satire" of a musical comedy.

== ABC-TV ==
The Peter Lind Hayes Show
- Genre: Variety show
- Written by: George Hope; Chuck Horner; Charles Slocum
- Directed by: Robert Blayer
- Presented by: Roland Winters
- Starring: Peter Lind Hayes; Mary Healy
- Music by: Bert Farber

Production
- Producer: Frank Musiello

Original release
- Network: ABC
- Release: October 13, 1958 – April 10, 1959

The variety program ran from October 13, 1958, until April 10, 1959. Its debut was part of ABC's expansion of live programming, called "Operation Daybreak". The show was one of seven that the network added then. Broadcast from 11:30 a.m. to 12:30 p.m. Eastern Time Monday through Friday, it featured John W. Bubbles, Anita Bryant, Don Cherry, and the Four Voices as performers in addition to Hayes and Healy. The announcer was Roland Winters. Guest stars included Sonny James, Ricardo Montalbán, Margaret Truman, Ray McDonald, Ferlin Husky, and Mickey & Sylvia.

A Motion Picture Daily poll of TV columnists and critics rated The Peter Lind Hayes Show second in the Best Daytime Program category.

=== Production ===
Frank Musiello was the producer. The director was Robert Blayer, and the music director was Bert Farber. Writers were George Hope, Chuck Horner, and Charles Slocum. The show usually originated from New York, but in March 1959 it was in Winter Haven, Florida, and Cypress Gardens, Florida, for a week from each site. When the program ended, its second half was replaced by The George Hamilton IV Show. Effective April 13, 1959, no network service was available for 11:30 p.m. to noon E. T. ABC wanted to continue the show in a 30-minute slot, but Hayes did not want to make that change.

=== Critical response ===
A review of the premiere episode in The New York Times said that Hayes's performance overcame even "an unconscionable number of commercials". Critic Jack Gould compared the informal nature of the program favorably to that of The Tonight Show and said that Hayes "is quick and amusing of tongue, chats with his guests in leisurely fashion and has a slight suggestion of agreeable weariness."

The trade publication Broadcasting called the program "undoubtedly the best entry in daytime tv [sic] this year". It said that Hayes was "amusing to both the ear and eye" and complimented the production, while the singers and musicians were described as "competent". It concluded that the show was "one of tv's happiest hours".

== CBS radio ==
The radio version of The Peter Lind Hayes Show was broadcast on Saturdays at 1:30 p.m. E. T. beginning February 13, 1954. It featured Hayes and Healy in a weekly half-hour variety format. Regular performers were Leslie Uggams, Jerry Vale, and Teddy Wilson. Norman Leyden's orchestra provided music. The announcer was George Bryan.

=== Production ===
Al Singer was the producer, and Frank Musiello was the director. The trade publication Variety reported that the program was "part of an ambitious attempt by program veepee [sic] Lester Gottlieb to give Saturday a bigtime [sic] commercial aura."

=== Critical response ===
A review in the trade publication Broadcasting found little to like about The Peter Lind Hayes Show. The review began by saying that although Hayes was highly regarded as an entertainer, "few of his capabilities are evident" in the program. It called his material "anything but top notch" and described it as "meaningless chatter". The review concluded by saying that the show needed planning, a script, and "the proper material and direction".

Variety said in a review that the premiere episode had "a comfortable and informal variety format" and compared Hayes favorably with Arthur Godfrey as host of a variety radio program. The review commended the singing of Vale and 10-year-old Uggams and noted that Healy was "an ideal foil" in matching wits with Hayes.
