= Peter Lind Hayes =

American actor and entertainer (1915–1998)

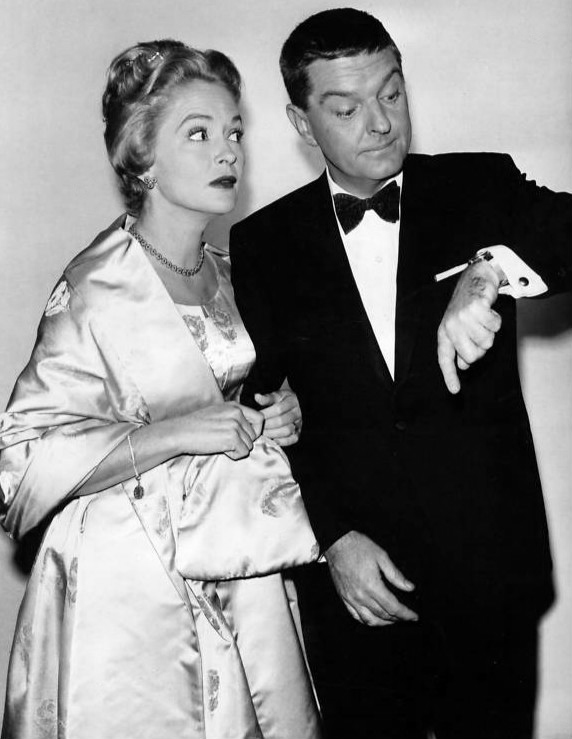
- Mary Healy and Peter Lind Hayes, guest hosts of The Tonight Show (1962)
- Born: Joseph Conrad Lind Jr. June 25, 1915; San Francisco, California, U.S.
- Died: April 21, 1998 (aged 82); Las Vegas, Nevada, U.S.
- Occupations: Stage, film and television actor
- Spouse: Mary Healy (m. 1940)
- Children: 2

Peter Lind Hayes (born Joseph Conrad Lind Jr.; June 25, 1915 – April 21, 1998) was an American vaudeville entertainer and film and television actor.

== Early life ==
Hayes was born in San Francisco, the son of Joseph Conrad Lind Sr., a railroad man and amateur singer, and vaudeville entertainer Grace Hayes (1895–1989). Joseph Lind Sr. died when his son was two years old. Hayes attended parochial school in Cairo, Illinois, during his early childhood before moving to the New York City suburb of New Rochelle and continuing his education there.

== Career ==
Hayes made his vaudeville debut with his mother at the age of six. In 1939, his mother sold some jewelry and borrowed $8,000 to open the Grace Hayes Lodge in Los Angeles, where he began working as a nightclub performer.

Hayes appeared in films throughout the 1930s and 1940s and had a significant television career in the 1950s. He often appeared with his wife Mary Healy. During World War II Hayes enlisted in the United States Army Air Forces and appeared in both the play and film of Winged Victory. In 1946, Hayes opened at the Copacabana in New York. This led to an engagement with the Dinah Shore radio show.

Hayes and Healy were the original singers of the Chevrolet jingle "See The U.S.A. In Your Chevrolet" in 1950. (Dinah Shore later sang the song for Chevrolet starting in 1952.) The couple starred in Zis Boom Bah (1941) along with Grace Hayes and were top-billed in the cult fantasy musical film The 5,000 Fingers of Dr. T. (1953). He also had a considerable reputation as a singer of comic songs, several of which made their way onto record, including "Life Gets Tee-Jus, Don't It".

Hayes may best be remembered for being designated substitute for Arthur Godfrey on both his CBS-TV and radio programs as well as several short-lived television series in which he and Healy co-hosted or co-starred, such as The Peter Lind Hayes Show (1950–51), Star of the Family (1950-1952), and Peter Loves Mary (1960–61). He also appeared on the pilot episode of The Match Game on December 5, 1962. He and his wife Mary were occasional guests on TV quiz shows To Tell the Truth, Password, and What's My Line? In 1964, he appeared in an episode of The Outer Limits, titled "Behold, Eck!", playing the lead role of Dr. Robert Stone, an absent-minded optical engineer and researcher.

== Personal life ==
Hayes was married to Mary Healy from 1940 until his death in 1998.

In 1961, Hayes and Healy co-authored their biography, titled Twenty-Five Minutes from Broadway. The title was inspired by the name of the George M. Cohan musical Forty-five Minutes from Broadway, about the community of New Rochelle, New York where the two lived. They owned Columbia Island in New Rochelle, along the Long Island Sound shore. From that house, they broadcast a weekday breakfast conversation show on New York radio station 710 WOR.

== Death ==
Hayes died from vascular problems in Las Vegas, Nevada, at the age of 82.
