= King Calder =

American actor (1898–1964)

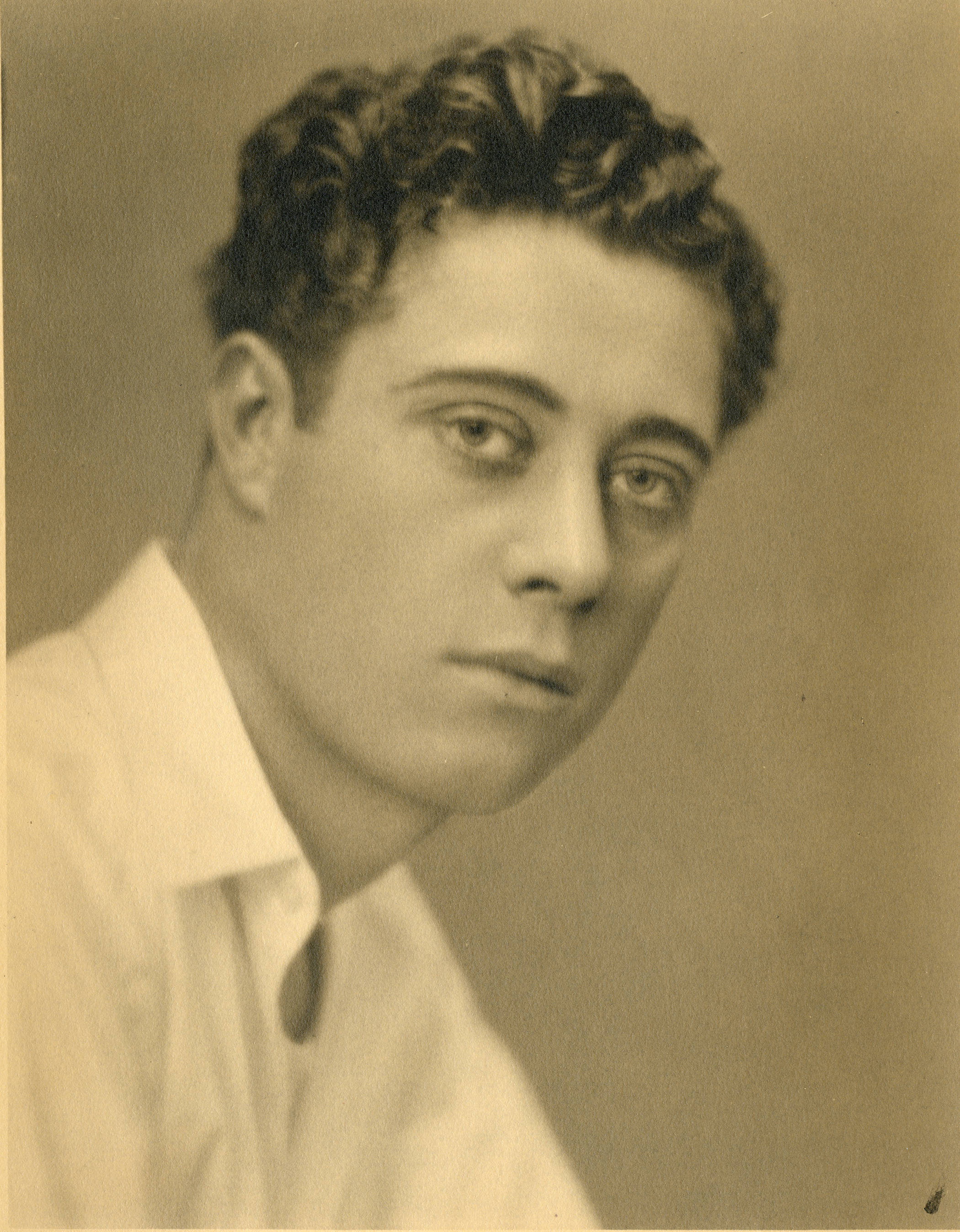
- Calder in 1926
- Born: Albert King Calder; April 21, 1898; Baltimore, Maryland, U.S.
- Died: June 28, 1964 (aged 66); Los Angeles, California, U.S.
- Resting place: Ferncliff Cemetery, Westchester County, New York
- Occupation: Actor
- Years active: 1929–1964

Albert King Calder (April 21, 1898 – June 28, 1964) was an American film, television and theatre actor.

== Early life ==
Calder was born in Baltimore, Maryland. He began his acting career in 1929 in the Broadway play The Humbug, playing Dr. Norman Ware. He also appeared in other theatre productions, including over 500 performances of the 1940 play My Sister Eileen. Calder then moved to a stage company in Chicago, Illinois stage company. His final theatre credit was in 1951.

== Career ==
Calder began his screen career in 1949, when he appeared in the anthology television series The Clock. He starred in the crime drama series Martin Kane, Private Eye from 1952 to 1954. He guest-starred in television programs including The Fugitive, Trackdown, Man with a Camera, Bat Masterson, Tales of Wells Fargo, The Virginian, The Twilight Zone, Rawhide, Alfred Hitchcock Presents, Mr. Lucky, State Trooper, Perry Mason, and The Untouchables. His film credits include Time Table, Wall of Noise, Mardi Gras, The Rains of Ranchipur, Three Came to Kill, On the Threshold of Space, Everything's Ducky and Hong Kong Confidential.

== Death ==
Calder died on June 28, 1964 of a heart attack at the Good Samaritan Hospital in Los Angeles, California, at the age of 67. He was buried in Ferncliff Cemetery.
