= See the USA in Your Chevrolet =

1948 commercial jingle

"See The U.S.A. In Your Chevrolet"
- Dinah Shore singing the song in a television advertisement for the 1959 Chevrolet Impala

Song by Dinah Shore
- Published: July 23, 1948
- Genre: Traditional pop
- Length: 0:50
- Composer: Leon Carr
- Lyricist: Leo Corday

"See The U.S.A. In Your Chevrolet" is a 1948 commercial jingle with lyrics and music by Leo Corday and Leon Carr of the American Society of Composers, Authors and Publishers (ASCAP). It was written for the Chevrolet Division of General Motors, which holds the song's 1948 (unpublished) and 1950 (published) copyrights.

The jingle was sung on the television program Inside U.S.A. with Chevrolet by real-life husband-wife duo, Peter Lind Hayes and Mary Healy. It became associated with Dinah Shore through Chevrolet's decade-long sponsorship of her television shows. Shore sang the song after 1952, and it became a signature song of hers. Later the song was also sung by Pat Boone on his Pat Boone-Chevy Showroom (ABC) from 1957 through 1960.

In the mid-1960s, Chevrolet was one of the sponsors for the Los Angeles Dodgers' radio coverage. When the Dodgers broadcast games on television, Chevrolet commercials were aired in which the song was sung by John Roseboro and Don Drysdale of the Dodgers. Upon seeing the commercials, Dodgers' announcer Jerry Doggett joked that Roseboro's and Drysdale's singing career "was destined to go absolutely nowhere."

== Adaptations ==
Over the years, this song has also been customized by local Chevrolet dealerships, incorporating the dealer name, brands and/or area they service. One example can be found in Honolulu, Hawaii, where The JN Automotive Group used the Dinah Shore commercial footage in a 2011 TV commercial that featured their customers singing the song.

Automotive dealership Ellis Brooks Chevrolet (now Ellis Brooks Auto Center) in San Francisco, California adapted the song into "See Ellis Brooks Today for Your Chevrolet". The radio and television advertisement became iconic throughout the San Francisco Bay Area.

Super Bowl XLV, the cast of Glee did a cross-promotion with Chevrolet which involved Sue Sylvester enticing the glee club to do a commercial in which they would receive a Chevrolet Cruze if they participated, knowing that doing so would disqualify the New Directions from competing in any contests. Although the song was used in a dream sequence that involved a big budget production number, the group (in reality) declined Sue's bribe upon Rachel Berry's realization of Sue's ulterior motive, which had previously caused trouble for the Glee club in a season 1 episode, "Mattress". Chevrolet ran several Super Bowl advertisements, one of which was this 30-second ad. The ad served as a teaser for a 2-minute and 20 second ad featuring the Glee cast as singers and dancers during a Lea Michele-led rendition of "See the USA in Your Chevrolet" that aired during the Super Bowl lead-out program, which was "The Sue Sylvester Shuffle" episode of Glee. A 60-second version of the ad was aired along with movie trailers at nationwide movie theaters. The commercial was also to promote the 2011 Glee Live! In Concert! tour. The "See the USA" ad was directed by Alfonso Gomez-Rejon. Russell Carpenter was the director of photography.

In 2026 country singer Brooke Lee did a new version of the song for a commercial that aired during the 2026 Winter Olympics, and has been airing since.
