= Uptown Jubilee =

All-black 1949 American TV variety show

- Also known as: Harlem Jubilee; Sugar Hill Times
- Genre: Variety
- Created by: Barry Woods
- Starring: Willie Bryant (host); Maxine Sullivan; Timmie Rogers; Harry Belafonte
- Country of origin: United States
- Original language: English
- No. of seasons: 1
- No. of episodes: 5

Production
- Running time: 30 minutes/60 minutes

Original release
- Network: CBS Television
- Release: September 13 – October 20, 1949

Uptown Jubilee is an American all-black variety show that aired on CBS Television from September 13 to October 20, 1949. The show aired live on Tuesday nights from 8pm to 9pm ET during September, and on Thursdays from 8:30pm to 9pm ET during October.

== Broadcast history ==
The program aired three times as an hour-long show, each with a different title: premiering as Uptown Jubilee, changing to Harlem Jubilee, and finally Sugar Hill Times, the title also used during the two half-hour telecasts on October 6 and 20.

The show was hosted by Willie Bryant, with performers including Maxine Sullivan, Timmie "Oh Yeah" Rogers, Harry Belafonte, The Jubileers, and Don Redman and His Orchestra.

Sugar Hill Times was among the first regularly scheduled prime time network television series with an all-black cast. This series premiered with the title Harlem Jubilee but after the first episode aired CBS learned that the title was already registered for use by KHJ, a radio station in Los Angeles. Uptown Jubilee was used for the second episode and that title was found to be too close to another title registered so CBS changed the title to Sugar Hill Times, starting with the third episode, as reported by The New York Times on October 9, 1949.

The show, scheduled against Milton Berle's Texaco Star Theater, the hottest show of the 1949-50 season, failed to find an audience, so after the third episode the shows running time was cut to 30 minutes and the show aired on alternate Thursdays. CBS couldn't find a sponsor in New York willing to pay the low price of $4,000 for the show—a typical hour went for $10,000 on a network at the time—so after five episodes the show was canceled.

Two unnamed members of the cast later complained that the shows producer, Barry Woods, had "done nothing to help keep the show alive" but Willie Bryant, host of the show, in a letter to the Washington Afro-American newspaper, dated December 27, 1949, stated "Of all the persons who were in any way connected with "Sugar Hill Times" Barry was by far the most interested and the most cooperative. Until the very last, he fought to keep the show going, and did so at the risk, sometimes of his own position at CBS. The fault of the closing down of this show lies elsewhere. And were I given the chance to return to TV and name my own producer, I would name Barry Woods!"

== See also ==
- 1949-50 United States network television schedule

== Bibliography ==
- Brooks, Tim; Marsh, Earle (1992), The Complete Directory to Prime Time Network TV Shows, Ballantine Books, ISBN 0-345-37792-3
- McNeil, Alex (1996), Total Television, Penguin Books, ISBN 0-14-024916-8
