= The 5,000 Fingers of Dr. T. =

1953 film by Roy Rowland

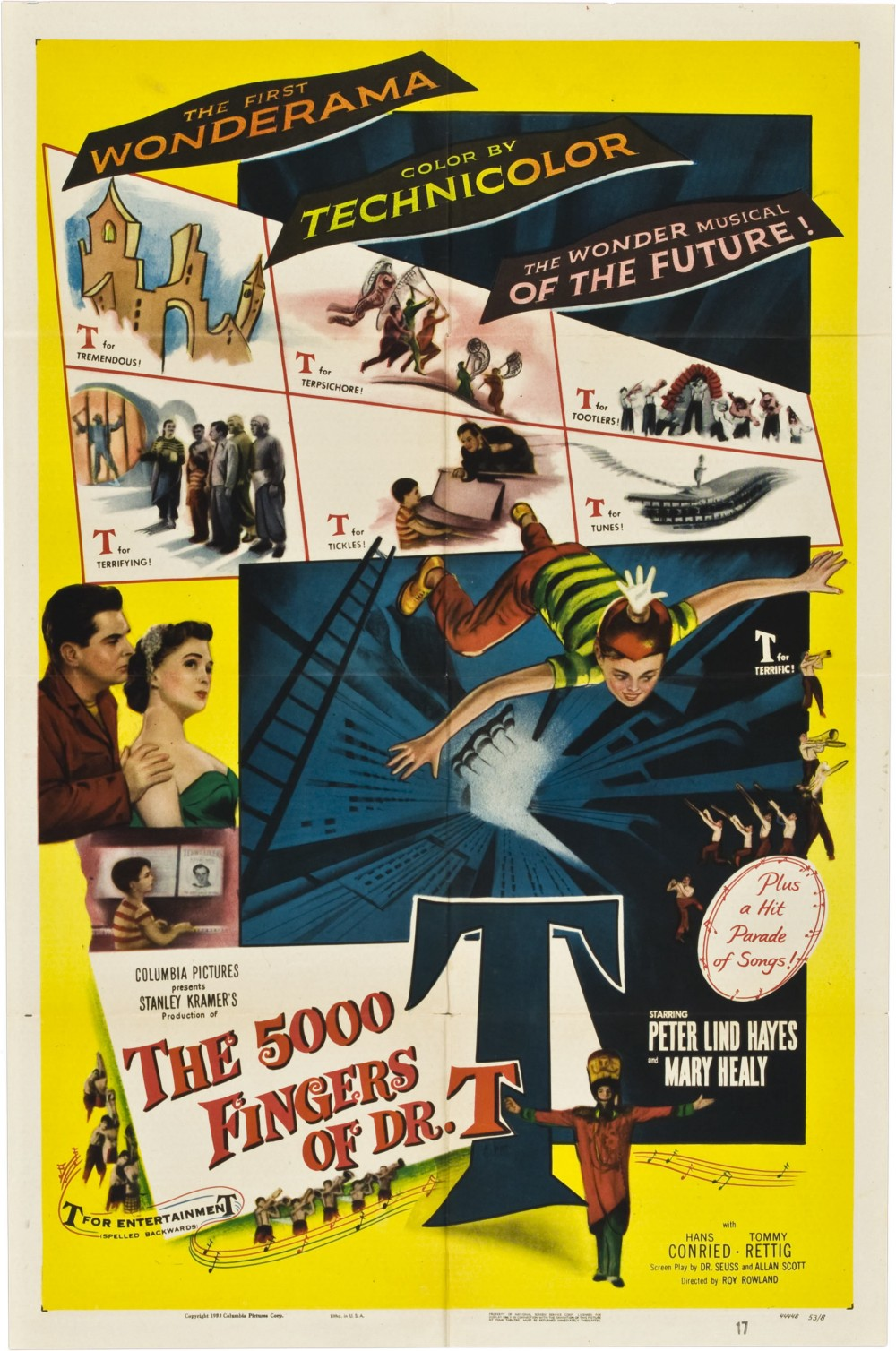
- Theatrical release poster
- Directed by: Roy Rowland
- Screenplay by: Dr. Seuss; Allan Scott
- Story by: Dr. Seuss
- Produced by: Stanley Kramer
- Starring: Peter Lind Hayes; Mary Healy; Hans Conried; Tommy Rettig
- Cinematography: Frank Planer
- Edited by: Al Clark
- Music by: Frederick Hollander
- Color process: Technicolor
- Production company: Stanley Kramer Company
- Distributed by: Columbia Pictures
- Release date: July 1, 1953
- Running time: 92 minutes
- Country: United States
- Language: English
- Budget: $2.7 million

The 5,000 Fingers of Dr. T. (also known as Crazy Music in the 1958 reissue) is a 1953 American musical fantasy film about a boy who dreams himself into a fantasy world ruled by a diabolical piano teacher enslaving children to practice piano forever. It is the only non-documentary feature film written by Theodor Seuss Geisel (Dr. Seuss), who wrote the story, screenplay, and lyrics. It was directed by Roy Rowland, with many uncredited takes directed by producer Stanley Kramer. The film stars Peter Lind Hayes, Mary Healy, Hans Conried, and Tommy Rettig.

== Plot ==
Bart Collins (Tommy Rettig) lives with his widowed mother Heloise (Mary Healy). The bane of Bart's existence is piano lessons he endures under the tutelage of the bossy and egotistical pianist, Dr. Terwilliker (Hans Conried). Bart feels that his mother has fallen under Terwilliker's influence, and gripes to their plumber, August Zabladowski (Peter Lind Hayes), without result. While hammering at his lessons, Bart dozes off and enters a musical dream.

In the dream, Bart is trapped at the Terwilliker Institute, where Terwilliker has imprisoned non-piano-playing musicians. He has built a piano so large that it requires Bart and four hundred ninety nine other boys to play it. Bart's mother has become Terwilliker's hypnotized assistant and bride-to-be, and Bart must dodge the institute's guards as he scrambles to save his mother and himself. He tries to recruit Zabladowski, who was hired to install the institute's sinks, but only after he finds evidence that Terwilliker plans to execute Zabladowski is Zabladowski convinced to help. Bart and Zabladowski free Heloise and attempt to flee, but are captured. In the dungeon, the two construct a noise-sucking contraption which ruins the mega-piano's opening concert. The enslaved boys run riot, bang out a boisterous version of "chopsticks" on the mega-piano and, when the noise-sucker explodes in spectacular fashion, Bart awakes from his dream.

When Mr. Zabladowski offers to drive Heloise to town in his jeep, Bart grabs his baseball glove and, with his dog "Sport," runs up the street to play.

== Cast ==
- Peter Lind Hayes as August Zabladowski
- Mary Healy as Heloise Collins
- Hans Conried as Dr. Terwilliker
- Tommy Rettig as Bartholomew Collins
- John Heasley as Uncle Whitney
- Robert Heasley as Uncle Judson
- Noel Cravat as Sgt. Lunk

=== Uncredited (in order of appearance) ===
- Henry Kulky as Stroogo
- George Chakiris as Dancer
- Tony Butala as Boy pianist
- Harry Wilson as Guard / doorman
- Alan Aric as Elevator operator

== Production ==
In the wake of the success of Gerald McBoing-Boing, Geisel submitted a live-action storyline for The 5,000 Fingers of Dr. T. in 1951. Geisel followed it up with a 1200-page script, with "themes of world dominance and oppression coming out of World War II." Geisel relocated from La Jolla, California, to Los Angeles during filming to "enable him to be more involved in the production." His influence on set design and choreography is evident in the film.

Although Geisel was unaware of it at the time, his film production had landed in the middle of a bitter feud between film producer Stanley Kramer and the head of Columbia Pictures, Harry Cohn. Thus the shooting of the film was fraught from the start. Kramer had been forbidden from directing the movie himself by Cohn, and instead had appointed a studio journeyman, Roy Rowland. It also did not help that Cohn interfered constantly with the production by sending voluminous and unwanted notes to Kramer and Geisel.

Hans Conried was enthusiastic about the role, saying in retrospect, "I had never had any such part before, never have since and probably never will again. We rehearsed for eight weeks before I was engaged to shoot for eight weeks, an extravagance that I as a bit player had never known ... If it had been a success, with my prominent part in the title role, it would have changed my life."

Prior to release, a "preview version" was received poorly by a test audience. That prompted heavy cuts by the studio and a week of reshoots, included a new opening scene. Of the original 20 musical numbers filmed in their entirety, nine were removed. The removed songs still survive with the complete musical soundtrack. The "preview version" featuring the removed footage is considered lost. Columbia Pictures released the film a second time in 1958 with the entire elevator scene cut, under the title Crazy Music.

== Musical score ==
The score was composed by Frederick Hollander with lyrics by Dr. Seuss. It earned an Oscar nomination for "Best Scoring of a Musical Picture".

The singing voice of Tommy Rettig was dubbed by Tony Butala, the founder of The Lettermen.

The pre-recorded piano parts were performed uncredited by veteran Hollywood studio session pianist Ray Turner (1903–1971), who was known to the public for his own recordings, and for his piano performance on the popular 1948 children's album Sparky's Magic Piano.

=== Musical numbers ===
Theatrical cut:

1. "Opening Credits / Butterfly Ballet" — Dream Sequence
2. "Ten Happy Fingers"
3. "Piano Concerto (Ten Happy Fingers variation)"
4. "Dream Stuff"
5. "Hypnotic Duel"
6. "Get Together Weather"
7. "Because We're Kids"
8. "Dungeon Ballet"
9. "We Are Victorious"
10. "Dressing Song / Do-Mi-Do Duds"
11. "End Credits"

Original "preview" version:

1. "Overture/Main Title"
2. "Ten Happy Fingers"
3. "Piano Concerto (Ten Happy Fingers variation)"
4. "Oh! We Are the Guards"
5. "Many Questions"
6. "My Favorite Note"
7. "Dungeon Ballet"
8. "Grindstone"
9. "I Will Not Get Involved"
10. "Dream Stuff"
11. "I Won't Go to Bed/Massage Opera"
12. "You Opened My Eyes"
13. "Hypnotic Duel"
14. "Because We're Kids"
15. "Money"
16. "Freckle on a Pygmy"
17. "Butterfly Ballet"
18. "We Are Victorious"
19. "Dressing Song / Do-Mi-Do Duds"
20. "End Credits"

== Reception ==
At the Hollywood premiere, the first patrons began to trickle out after 15 minutes. After an hour it had become a tsunami. The leading man Hans Conried was quoted as saying by biographer Suzanne Gargiulo, "At the end there was only one boy left and he was waiting for his mother to pick him up". At the time it was released, the film received negative reviews from critics. Bosley Crowther called the film "strange and confused" and said:

...this [film] is not only abstruse in its symbols and in its vast elaboration of reveries but [is] also dismally lacking in the humor or the enchantment such an item should contain.

Geisel regarded the film as a "debaculous fiasco" and omitted mention of it in his official biography. He even stated after the film "Hollywood is not suited for me and I am not suited for it."

Hans Conried reflected on the film's box office failure in a 1970 interview with Leonard Maltin: "The picture never made its print money back. It was comparable only to Wilson as one of the great money-losers of all time; it would stop conversation for some years at any Hollywood social gathering."

James Lowder reviewed The 5,000 Fingers of Dr. T. in White Wolf Inphobia #51 (Jan., 1995), rating it a 5 out of 5 and stated that "to make a film promoting diversity at the height of a national witch-hunt for nonconformists shows vision and courage. And it's a cool movie to boot. Don't miss it."

=== 21st century ===
The film may have fared better over the years; as of September 2026, it has an 83% positive Rotten Tomatoes rating.

The home media releases of the film have spawned many new reviews. In 2001, Glenn Erickson wrote that the film was "another flop that has since gained the reputation of an artsy classic—a real cult film. It's colorful, energetic, and indeed can boast fine work by a cadre of talented Hollywoodians. But it's not very good." Later critics were more enthusiastic. In 2002, Peter Bradshaw said the film "has charm, a riotous imagination, and some very weird dream-like sets by production designer Rudolph Sternad and art director Cary Odell"; it's "surreal, disturbing, strong meat for young stomachs." In 2005, Violet Glaze of the Baltimore City Paper called the film "refreshingly tart and defiant for a children's film, its space-age-by-way-of-Caligari world parks right on the delicious side of creepy. Bring the kids, especially the smart ones." In 2008, Dennis Schwartz wrote that it was "probably the best children's fantasy film ever made by Hollywood—even if it's rambling." Jello Biafra named it his all-time favourite movie in a 2013 interview.

The film has also inspired the name of an electronic duo, 5000 Fingers of Dr T, formed in Sydney, Australia in 1994.

== Home media ==
The film was released by RCA/Columbia Pictures Home Video in 1991. It was then re-released in 1995, as part of the Columbia Tristar family collection. It became available on DVD in 2001 by Columbia Tristar Home Entertainment. It featured the Gerald McBoing-Boing short, Gerald McBoing-Boing's Symphony, as a bonus feature. Sony then re-released the DVD in 2008 as part of the Stanley Kramer collection. Finally, it was released as a region 1 Blu-Ray and DVD in 2016 by Mill Creek Entertainment, under licence from Sony.

== Soundtrack ==
The music that was composed for the film, including material that was not used in the extant copies of the film itself, was released as a set of 3 CDs in 2010. In 2007, a soundtrack CD (ACMEM126CD) was released by Él Records in association with Cherry Red Records.
