= Rodd Redwing =

American trickshooter, actor and stuntman

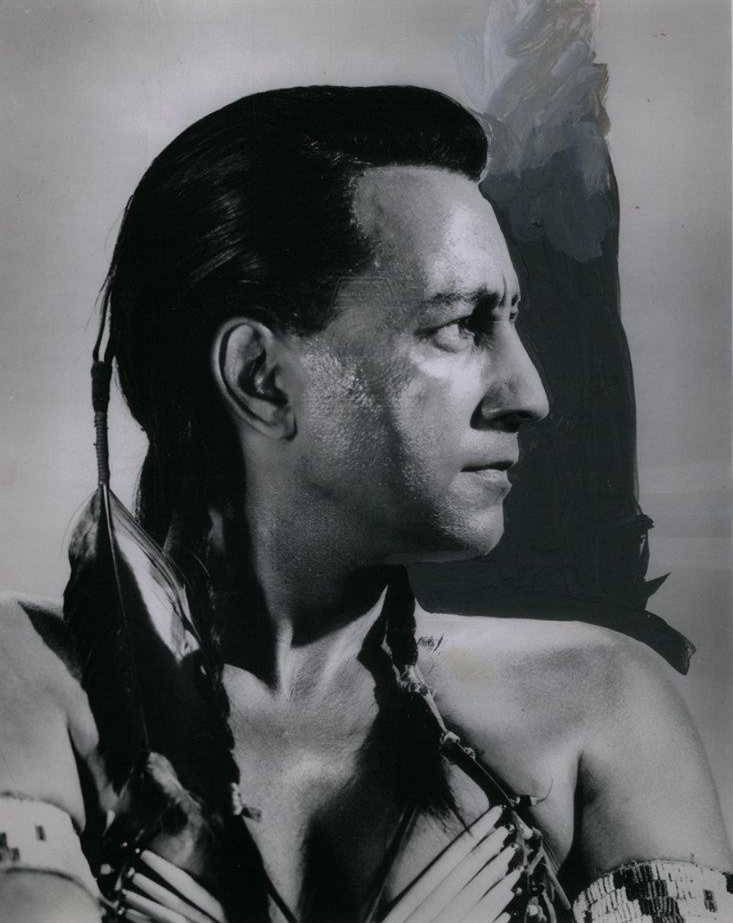
- Redwing in 1957
- Born: Webb Richardson; August 24, 1904; Tennessee U.S.
- Died: May 29, 1971 (aged 66); Los Angeles, California, U.S.
- Occupation: Actor
- Years active: 1912-1971
- Spouse: Erika Rosa Wagner

Roderic Redwing (born Webb Richardson; August 24, 1904 – May 29, 1971) was an American trickshooter, stunt performer, and actor known for his work in Western films. He was known as a top gun, knife, tomahawk, whip, and drill instructor in the Golden Age of Hollywood.

Though he presented himself as Chickasaw Native American, he was actually African American without any known Indigenous ancestry, a fact not widely revealed until after his death.

== Biography ==
Redwing was born Webb Richardson on August 24, 1904, to Black parents in Tennessee. His father, Ulysses William Richardson (b. 1873), was an elevator man. His mother, Lillian Webb (b. 1878), was a manicurist and hairdresser. Lillian divorced her husband William in 1920. Webb moved to New York City to attend New York University and pursue a career in acting; he appeared in the 1929 musical Malinda in Greenwich Village, with a cast of African American performers.

=== Native American persona ===
Webb later changed his name to Roderic "Rodd" Redwing, adopted a fictitious Native-American identity (a phenomenon sometimes now referred to as Pretendian), and reported his birthplace as New York City. Such a deception was not uncommon in early 20th-century America, where Chief Buffalo Child Long Lance (born Sylvester Clark Long) had fooled New York high society. Redwing claimed that his mother was from a Chickasaw reservation in Oklahoma, and that his father was a stage actor. Some sources reported that he used the Hindi-sounding name Roderick Rajpurkaii, Jr., and said his father was a Brahmin mind reader from India.

=== Career in Hollywood ===
As Redwing, he was one of the top gun, knife, tomahawk, and whip instructors in Hollywood. After claiming that he began in films in Cecil B. DeMille’s 1931 Western The Squaw Man (although no cast list shows that he acted in that movie), Redwing soon became a gun-handling coach to Alan Ladd, Ronald Reagan, Burt Lancaster, Glenn Ford, Richard Widmark, Anthony Quinn, Charlton Heston, Dean Martin, Fred MacMurray, and many other actors. He performed Alan Ladd's fancy gunspinning seen in the film Shane during the climatic showdown.

Between 1951 and 1967, Redwing appeared in more than a dozen television programs, including a guest appearance on the CBS celebrity quiz show, What's My Line?. He played the role of Mr. Brother, a Cheyenne friend and informer of Marshal Wyatt Earp's, in eight episodes of the television series The Life and Legend of Wyatt Earp.

=== Death ===
After filming his part in Red Sun, Redwing died at the age of 66. On a flight from Spain to Los Angeles, he suffered a heart attack and died 35 minutes later, just before the plane landed. The urn containing his ashes was buried in Hollywood Forever Cemetery.

== Filmography ==
- White Hunter (1936) - Farid (uncredited)
- Son of Fury: The Story of Benjamin Blake (1942) - Native (uncredited)
- When Johnny Comes Marching Home (1942) - Egyptian Clerk (uncredited)
- Daredevils of the West (1943) - Indian (uncredited)
- Frontier Fury (1943) - Captured Indian (uncredited)
- The Story of Dr. Wassell (1944) - Javanese Orderly (uncredited)
- Sonora Stagecoach (1944) - Indian (uncredited)
- Rainbow Island (1944) - Queen's Guard (uncredited)
- Objective, Burma! (1945) - Sgt. Chattu (uncredited)
- Out of the Depths (1945) - Mike Rawhide
- The Scarlet Horseman (1946) - Comanche Warrior (uncredited)
- Singin' in the Corn (1946) - Indian Brave
- Unconquered (1947) - Indian (uncredited)
- The Last Round-Up (1947) - Louie (uncredited)
- Intrigue (1947) - Spy in Editor's Office (uncredited)
- Key Largo (1948) - John Osceola (uncredited)
- Song of India (1949) - Kumari (uncredited)
- We Were Strangers (1949) - (uncredited)
- Riders of the Pony Express (1949) - Bearclaw - Henchman
- Laramie (1949) - Indian Lookout (uncredited)
- Rope of Sand (1949) - Oscar - Waiter (uncredited)
- Apache Chief (1949) - Tewa
- Samson and Delilah (1949) - Temple Spectator (uncredited)
- Cargo to Capetown (1950) - Native Cab Driver (uncredited)
- Kim (1950) - Creighton's Servant (uncredited)
- The Redhead and the Cowboy (1951) - Betien - Indian Guard (uncredited)
- Little Big Horn (1951) - Cpl. Arika
- Thunder in the East (1951) - Hassam (uncredited)
- Buffalo Bill in Tomahawk Territory (1952) - Running Deer
- Rancho Notorious (1952) - Rio
- Hellgate (1952) - Pima (uncredited)
- Son of Geronimo (1952) - Porico, Son of Geronimo
- The Pathfinder (1952) - Chief Arrowhead
- Winning of the West (1953) - Pete Littlewolf (uncredited)
- Last of the Comanches (1953) - Indian (uncredited)
- Conquest of Cochise (1953) - Red Knife
- Saginaw Trail (1953) - Huron Chief (uncredited)
- Flight to Tangier (1953) - Police Orderly
- Creature From the Black Lagoon (1954) - Luis - Expedition Foreman (uncredited)
- The Naked Jungle (1954) - Indian (uncredited)
- Gunfighters of the Northwest (1954) - Bear Tooth
- Elephant Walk (1954) - Servant (uncredited)
- Cattle Queen of Montana (1954) - Powhani
- The Twinkle in God's Eye (1955) - Indian (uncredited)
- The Treasure of Pancho Villa (1955) - Yaqui Tracker (uncredited)
- Jaguar (1956) - Porter #1
- The Ten Commandments (1956) - Taskmaster / Hebrew at Golden Calf
- The Mole People (1956) - Nazar
- Copper Sky (1957) - Indian (uncredited)
- The Sad Sack (1957) - Bartender (uncredited)
- The Flame Barrier (1958) - Waumi
- Wagon Train (1959) S3 E7 "The Cappy Darrin Story" - Indian Chief
- Heller in Pink Tights (1960) - Indian (uncredited)
- Flaming Star (1960) - Indian Warrior
- One-Eyed Jacks (1961)
- Sergeants 3 (1962) - Irregular
- 4 for Texas (1963) - Indian (uncredited)
- The Virginian (1964 episode "The Intruders") - Black Feather's Brave
- Apache Uprising (1965) - Archie Whitewater
- Johnny Reno (1966) - Indian Brave
- The Shakiest Gun in the West (1968) - White Buffalo (uncredited)
- Shalako (1968) - Chato's Father
- Charro! (1969) - Lige
- Red Sun (1971)

== See also ==
- Iron Eyes Cody
- Sacheen Littlefeather
