= Gunslinger (TV series) =

American TV Western series (1961)

- Starring: Tony Young
- Country of origin: United States
- Original language: English
- No. of seasons: 1
- No. of episodes: 12

Production
- Running time: 60 minutes

Original release
- Network: CBS
- Release: February 9 – June 3, 1961

Gunslinger is an American Western television series starring Tony Young that aired on the CBS television network from February 9, 1961, through September 14, 1961, on Thursdays from 9 to 10 p.m. EST. The theme song was sung by Frankie Laine. The program was also broadcast in London.

== Plot ==
Young played Cord, a young gunfighter who works undercover for the local army garrison commander at Fort Scott in the New Mexico Territory, acting as a secret law enforcement agent in the territory. Pico McGuire, Murdock, and Billy Urchin were agents working undercover with Cord. Captain Zachary Wingate was Cord's superior, and Amber Hollister was the romantic interest for Cord.

Gunslinger was the successor to Dick Powell's Zane Grey Theater.

== Cast ==
- Tony Young as Cord
- Preston Foster as Captain Zachary Wingate
- Charles Gray as Pico McGuire
- Dee Pollock as Billy Urchin
- Midge Ware as Amby Hollister
- John M. Pickard as Sgt. Major Murdock

== Guest stars ==
- Roy Barcroft
- Henry Brandon
- Anthony Caruso
- Phyllis Coates
- Lloyd Corrigan
- Royal Dano
- Jim Davis
- Buddy Ebsen
- Jack Elam
- Gene Evans
- Jock Gaynor
- Raymond Guth
- Ron Hagerthy
- Don C. Harvey
- Myron Healey
- Anne Helm
- John Hoyt
- George Kennedy
- Sandy Kenyon
- Norman Leavitt
- Celia Lovsky
- Barbara Luna
- Jock Mahoney
- Stafford Repp
- Addison Richards
- William Schallert
- Jay Silverheels
- Quentin Sondergaard
- Fay Spain
- Harry Dean Stanton
- William Tannen
- Vaughn Taylor
- Guy Teague
- Rick Vallin

Episode #	Episode title	Original airdate	Episode Summary
1-1	"The Buried People"	February 9, 1961	Cord goes undercover to hunt down a former medical officer charged with torturing and starving prisoners of war.
1-2	"The Hostage Fort"	February 16, 1961	On assignment for the commandant of Fort Scott, prevents the populace of a neighboring community from lynching a man (Jack Elam) by turning him over to the Army.
1-3	"Appointment in Cascabel"	February 23, 1961	Amby is kidnapped by a Mexican bandit who asks for a ransom that equals the price on his head.
1-4	"The Zone"	March 2, 1961	A town caught in a border dispute between the United States and Mexico because of a shift in the flow of the Rio Grande becomes a zone for the lawless.
1-5	"Rampage"	March 16, 1961	A former Confederate Army major escapes from military confinement at Fort Scott with U.S. Army uniforms, and uses them to outfit his own men.
1-6	"The Recruit"	March 23, 1961	A lost shipment of Confederate Army silver bars spurs Cord on a hunt which ends in murder.
1-7	"Road of the Dead"	March 30, 1961	Cord engages in a hunt for a killer he believes to be his own father.
1-8	"Golden Circle"	April 13, 1961	A dangerous killer is released from prison in order to lead Cord to a large sum of currency stolen from the Union Army during the Civil War.
1-9	"The Diehards"	April 20, 1961	An army patrol and several troopers are slain under mysterious circumstances.
1-10	"Johnny Sergeant"	May 4, 1961	A community, irate over the rowdy off-duty activities of the military, helps convict an innocent Native American soldier of attacking a woman.
1-11	"The Death of Yellow Singer"	May 11, 1961	A Navajo girl, turned over to the army for killing a Native American leader, would rather die than reveal the reasons for her act.
1-12	"The New Savannah Story"	May 18, 1961	A group of Southern women, survivors of the Civil War, try to establish a cotton plantation in the Arizona territory.

== Production ==
Gunslinger was the mid-season replacement for The Witness. Charles Marquis Warren was the executive producer, and Seeleg Lester was the producer. Andrew McLaglen was the director, and John Dunkel and Louis Vittes were the writers. CBS Productions produced 12 episodes of the program in black and white. The show's competition included My Three Sons and The Untouchables on ABC and The Tennessee Ernie Ford Show and Great Ghost Tales on NBC.

The trade publication Variety reported in March 1961, "... CBS is writing off 'Gunslinger' after half a season". It added that the show "hasn't made much of a rating impact and network officials aren't that high on the stanza as a qualitative entry anyway."

== Critical response ==
A review of the premiere episode in The New York Times called Gunslinger "a crisp, slick Western fashioned in the professionally competent tradition of Hollywood." The review complimented the episode's writing, visual aspects, and acting and added, "the musical background and other production elements were skillfully employed."
