= Little Big Horn (film) =

1951 film by Charles Marquis Warren

- Theatrical release poster
- Directed by: Charles Marquis Warren
- Screenplay by: Charles Marquis Warren
- Story by: Harold Shumate
- Produced by: Carl K. Hittleman
- Starring: Lloyd Bridges; John Ireland; Marie Windsor
- Cinematography: Ernest Miller (as Ernest W. Miller)
- Edited by: Carl Pierson
- Music by: Paul Dunlap
- Production companies: Bail Productions Inc. Robert L. Lippert Productions
- Distributed by: Lippert Pictures
- Release date: July 26, 1951 (New York)
- Running time: 86 minutes
- Country: United States
- Language: English
- Box office: $500,000

Little Big Horn (also known as The Fighting Seventh) is a 1951 American Western film written and directed by Charles Marquis Warren and starring Lloyd Bridges, John Ireland and Marie Windsor.

== Plot ==
Captain Phillip Donlin and his small troop rush to reach Little Big Horn to warn Lt. Colonel Custer of the Sioux attack that awaits him. As they race against time and Donlin pushes his men through an arduous and dangerous journey, the Sioux begin killing the soldiers one at a time. Donlin also clashes with Lt. John Haywood, who is having an affair with his (Donlin's) wife Celie.

== Cast ==
- Lloyd Bridges as Capt. Phillip Donlin
- John Ireland as Lt. John Haywood
- Marie Windsor as Celie Donlin
- Reed Hadley as Sgt. Maj. Peter Grierson
- Jim Davis as Cpl. Doan Moylan
- Wally Cassell as Pvt. Danny Zecca
- Hugh O'Brian as Pvt. Al DeWalt
- King Donovan as Pvt. James Corbo
- Richard Emory as Pvt. Mitch Shovels
- John Pickard as Sgt. Vet McCloud
- Richard Sherwood as Pvt. David Mason
- Sheb Wooley as Quince
- Larry Stewart as Bugler Stevie Williams
- Rodd Redwing as Cpl. Arika (as Rod Redwing)
- Dick Paxton as Pvt. Ralph Hall (as Richard Paxton)
- Gordon Wynn as Pvt. Arndt Hofstetter
- Ted Avery as Pvt. Tim Harvey
- Barbara Woodell as Margaret Owen
- Anne Warren as Anne Owen

== Production ==
The film was to be the first of a two-picture deal that Charles Marquis Warren had signed with Republic Pictures. Warren was a leading writer best known for Only the Valiant who wanted to become a director. The film was originally titled The Black Hills and was to be produced by Joseph Kane and star Rod Cameron. Filming was set to begin on March 10, 1950.

The film shifted to Lippert Pictures, and filming was rescheduled to start on November 7, 1950. The start of production was again delayed to February 1951.

Marie Windsor later recalled that a Lippert Films executive announced that the film's budget had been exhausted, forcing several pages to be removed from the script, and the film was completed without some of its intended scenes.

== Reception ==
In a contemporary review for The New York Times, critic Howard Thompson wrote: "'Little Big Horn' ... is a Western that starts off on the right hoof and ends up right back in the old tried-and-true rut. Credit the picture, though, for trying hard not to. ... Mr. Ireland looks and acts as though he'd just crawled out of bed—the wrong side. And Mr. Bridges, as their tough leader, bucking the redskins, the pallid acting of the rest of the cast, the erratic direction and a standard assignment, is mighty fine."

== Awards ==
Little Big Horn was nominated for an award by the Writers Guild of America in 1952.

== Sources ==
- Farber, Manny. 2009. Farber on Film: The Complete Film Writings of Manny Farber. Edited by Robert Polito. Library of America. ISBN 978-1-59853-050-6
