= Bing Russell =

American actor and baseball club owner (1926–2003)

- Born: Neil Oliver Russell; May 5, 1926; Brattleboro, Vermont, U.S.
- Died: April 8, 2003 (aged 76); Thousand Oaks, California, U.S.
- Occupations: Actor, owner of the Portland Mavericks
- Years active: 1951–1990
- Spouse: Louise Crone (m. 1946)
- Children: 4, including Kurt
- Relatives: Matt Franco (grandson); Wyatt Russell (grandson)

Neil Oliver "Bing" Russell (May 5, 1926 – April 8, 2003) was an American actor and Class A minor-league baseball club owner. He was the father of Hollywood actor Kurt Russell and grandfather of ex–major league baseball player Matt Franco and actor Wyatt Russell.

== Early life ==
Russell was born in Brattleboro, Vermont, the son of Ruth Stewart (née Vogel) and Warren Oliver Russell. He always wanted to become an actor and studied drama at Brattleboro High School. He grew up around the New York Yankees' spring training camp in St. Petersburg, Florida, in the 1930s and 1940s, where his father ran a floatplane service. As a result, he was an unofficial mascot of the New York Yankees, and became friendly with players including Lefty Gomez and Joe DiMaggio. When Lou Gehrig was weakened by Lou Gehrig’s disease, he gave Russell the bat he used to hit his last home run before retiring.

Russell graduated from Dartmouth College with a business degree.

== Career ==
Russell made his debut in the film Cavalry Patrol, and had some uncredited roles in his early career.

Best known as Deputy Clem Foster on Bonanza (1959) and Robert in The Magnificent Seven (1960), he guest-starred in episodes of many television series, including Playhouse 90, Highway Patrol, Wagon Train, The Life and Legend of Wyatt Earp, The Loretta Young Show, Johnny Ringo, Walt Disney's Wonderful World of Color, The Rifleman, Maverick, Zane Grey Theater, Route 66, Rawhide, Ben Casey, The Untouchables, Hazel, The Andy Griffith Show, The Twilight Zone, The Donna Reed Show, The Munsters, Gunsmoke, Combat!, Branded, The Fugitive, The Monkees, I Dream of Jeannie, Ironside, The Big Valley, Death Valley Days, Adam-12, The Virginian, Alias Smith and Jones, The Mod Squad, Mannix, The Rockford Files, The Streets of San Francisco, Emergency!, and Little House on the Prairie.

In 1963, he was cast as John Quigley, a Chicago mobster, in the episode "Five Tickets to Hell" of Jack Webb's CBS anthology series, GE True. In the storyline, Quigley travels to Chihuahua, Mexico, where he robs the mint of $500,000 and kills seven men in the commission of the crime. Police Lieutenant Juan Garcia (Carlos Romero) tracks down Quigley and his three accomplices. BarBara Luna also appears in the episode.

Russell appeared in the original pilot for The Monkees television series, filmed in November 1965, playing Rudy, a record store owner who also served as the group’s manager. After NBC approved the series, the concept of the band having a manager was dropped, and Russell’s character was written out. However, an edited version of the pilot featuring Russell was later broadcast as a regular first-season episode and remains part of the show’s syndication package.

Russell much later played Vernon Presley to his son Kurt's Elvis Presley in the television movie, Elvis (1979). Kurt, as a child actor, had appeared with the real Elvis in the film It Happened at the World's Fair, and in a later interview recalled the singer-actor, professing to be a fan, asking to meet Bing, who had accompanied his son to the set.

Russell owned the Portland Mavericks (1973–1977), the only independent team in the Short Season Northwest League. Russell kept a 30-man roster because he believed that some of the players deserved to have one last season. His motto was fun. He created a park that kept all corporate sponsorship outside the gates, hired the first female general manager, Lanny Moss in professional baseball, and named the first Asian American GM/Manager. His team set a record for the highest attendance in minor league history, but lost the 1977 pennant to the Bellingham Mariners. Subsequently, Major League Baseball regained interest in Portland. The Albuquerque, NM franchise relocated to Portland (for nine years) and resurrected the Class AAA Portland Beavers name. The Portland area was recovered but was forced to pay $206,000 to Russell after he took the matter to arbitration; it was the biggest payout in baseball history for a minor league territory. Ex-major-leaguers and never-weres who could not stop playing the game flocked to his June try-outs, which were always open to anyone who showed up. The team and archival footage of Russell were featured in the documentary The Battered Bastards of Baseball (2014).

== Personal life ==
In 1945, while working at Teddy's Restaurant in Newport, New Hampshire, a co-worker introduced Russell to his future wife, Louise "Lulu" Crone. Russell and Crone married in 1946 and had four children together, including actor Kurt Russell.

== Death ==
Russell died from complications of cancer on April 8, 2003, in Thousand Oaks, California.

== Recognition ==
In 1974, the Sporting News named Russell minor league executive of the year.

In 2020, he was inducted into the Hall of Great Westerners of the National Cowboy & Western Heritage Museum.

== Filmography ==
- The Living Christ Series (1951) as Lazarus
- Big Leaguer (1953) as Undetermined Role (uncredited)
- Soldier (1953, TV series) as Sgt. Corbett
- Public Defender (1954, TV series) as 2nd Cop
- Crashout (1955) as Young Man with Girl in Bar (uncredited)
- Kiss Me Deadly (1955) as Police Detective (uncredited)
- Cult of the Cobra (1955) as Laundry Man (uncredited)
- Tarantula (1955) as Deputy (uncredited)
- Lucy Gallant (1955) as One of Casey's Air Force Buddies (uncredited)
- You Are There (1953–1955, TV Series) as Disheartened Soldier
- Cavalry Patrol (1956, TV Movie) as Jenner
- The Price of Fear (1956) as Maxie (uncredited)
- Behind the High Wall (1956) as Guard (uncredited)
- Attack (1956) as Medic (uncredited)
- Science Fiction Theatre (1956, TV Series) as Radio Operator
- Highway Patrol (1956–1957, TV Series) as Toby Larkin
- Teenage Thunder (1957) as Used-car salesman
- Drango (1957) as Lieutenant with Supply Wagon
- The True Story of Jesse James (1957) as Jayhawker Sergeant (uncredited)
- Fear Strikes Out (1957) as Ballplayer Holding Trophy (uncredited)
- The Land Unknown (1957) as Navy Radio Operator (uncredited)
- Navy Log (1956–1957, TV Series) as Bob Harris
- The Ford Television Theatre (1957, TV Series) as Lieutenant Young
- The Silent Service (1957, TV Series) as Lieutenant Jackson
- The Deadly Mantis (1957) as State Trooper at Train & Bus Wrecks (uncredited)
- Hellcats of the Navy (1957) as Frogman on Submarine (uncredited)
- Bailout at 43,000 (1957) as Flyer at Bar (uncredited)
- Gunfight at the O.K. Corral (1957) as Harry (Griffin bartender) (uncredited)
- Playhouse 90 (1957, TV Series)
- Beau James (1957) as Reporter (uncredited)
- The Land Unknown (1957) as Radio operator (uncredited)
- The Web (1957, TV Series) as Police Officer
- The Walter Winchell File (1957, TV Series)
- Harbor Command (1957, TV Series) as Jim
- Casey Jones (1957, TV Series) as Baylor
- Wagon Train (1957, TV Series) as Private Cullen
- Bombers B-52 (1957) as Operator (uncredited)
- Ride a Violent Mile (1957) as Corporal Norman
- Tombstone Territory (1957, TV Series) as Ollie Williams
- Suspicion (1957, TV Series) as Mechanic
- Teenage Thunder (1957) as Used-Car Salesman
- Flight (1958, TV Series) as Pilot
- The Life and Legend of Wyatt Earp (1958, TV Series) as Sergeant Turner
- The Lady Takes a Flyer (1958) as First Tower Controller (uncredited)
- Suicide Battalion (1958) as Lt. Chet Hall
- The Loretta Young Show (1955–1958, TV Series) as Convict
- Sugarfoot (1958, TV Series) as Sergeant McKinnock
- Cattle Empire (1958) as Douglas Hamilton
- The Lineup (1958, TV Series) as Theodore
- Northwest Passage (1958, TV Series) as Pvt. Ben Smith
- Gunsmoke (1958, TV Series) as Ed Shelby
- Good Day for a Hanging (1959) as George Fletcher
- Rio Bravo (1959) as Cowboy murdered in saloon (uncredited)
- Colt .45 (1958–1959, TV Series) as Jack Lowden
- The Horse Soldiers (1959) as Dunker, Yankee Soldier Amputee
- Last Train from Gun Hill (1959) as Skag, Belden Hand
- The Texan (1959, TV Series) as Larry Boland
- Black Saddle (1959, TV Series) as Ken Wilson
- Johnny Ringo (1959, TV Series) as Dick Walsh
- Disneyland (1959, TV Series) as Arne
- Texas John Slaughter (1959, TV Series) as Arne
- Tales of Wells Fargo (1959, TV Series) as Captain Maynard
- The Alaskans (1960, TV Series) as Edward Carse
- Wanted: Dead or Alive (1959–1960, TV Series) as Billy Hemp
- Gunsmoke (1960) as Garve Tabor
- Shotgun Slade (1960, TV Series) as Deputy U.S. Marshal Benton
- Wrangler (1960, TV Series) as Ritter
- Tate (1960, TV Series) as Corey
- The Rifleman (1959–1960, TV Series) as Hode Evans & Sanchez
- The Magnificent Seven (1960) as Robert, (Henry's traveling companion)
- Dick Powell's Zane Grey Theater (1956–1960, TV Series) as Cole
- Bonanza (1961–1973) (TV series) as Deputy Clem Foster
- The Great Impostor (1961) as Morgan (uncredited)
- Surfside 6 (1961, TV Series) as Ron Kaslow
- Saint of Devil's Island (1961) as Gerard
- The Brothers Brannagan (1961, TV Series) as Fenner in "Tough Guy"
- The Blue Angels (1961, TV Series) as Denton in episode "The Duster"
- Maverick (1957–1962, TV Series) as Luke Storm
- Bronco (1959–1962, TV Series) as Jeb Thomas
- Rawhide (1962, TV Series) as Jack Harris
- The Virginian (1962 TV series) as Sgt. Eads, a member of Roosevelt's Rough Riders in the episode "Riff-Raff"
- Alcoa Premiere (1962, TV Series) as Hogan
- Ben Casey (1962, TV Series) as John
- Have Gun - Will Travel (1958–1962, TV Series) as Andy Dawes and Sheriff Reagan
- The Untouchables (1961–1962, TV Series) as Officer Cavanaugh
- Stakeout! (1962) as Joe
- The Andy Griffith Show (1963, TV Series) as Mr. Burton
- Stoney Burke (1963, TV Series) as Neeley
- Laramie (1960–1963, TV Series) as Reeves
- Sam Benedict (1963, TV Series) as Len George
- G.E. True (1963, TV Series) as John Quigley
- The Stripper (1963) as Mr. Mulvaney
- A Gathering of Eagles (1963) as Captain (uncredited)
- The Twilight Zone (1961–1963, TV Series) as Ben Braden
- One Man's Way (1964) as Tom Rayburn
- Cheyenne Autumn (1964) as Braden's Telegraph Operator (uncredited)
- The Donna Reed Show (1964, TV Series) as Bill Gayley
- The Munsters (1965, TV Series) as The Second Ranger
- Combat! (1965, TV Series) as Gaines
- The Hallelujah Trail (1965) as Horner (miner)
- A Man Called Shenandoah (1965, TV Series) as Clem
- Branded (1965–1966, TV Series) as Sheriff Gorman
- Incident at Phantom Hill (1966) as General's Aide (uncredited)
- The Fugitive (1963–1966, TV Series) as Davis
- Madame X (1966) as Police Sgt. Riley
- Billy the Kid versus Dracula (1966) as Dan 'Red' Thorpe
- The Monroes (1966, TV Series) as Aaron
- The Monkees (1966, TV Series) as Rudy Gunther in S1:E10, "The Monkees"
- Run for Your Life (1966, TV Series) as Deputy
- I Dream of Jeannie (1967, TV Series) as Amos Lincoln
- The Ride to Hangman's Tree (1967) as Keller (uncredited)
- Dundee and the Culhane (1967, TV Series) as H.P. Graham
- Hondo (1967, TV Series) as Thompson
- Blackbeard's Ghost (1968) as Second Official (uncredited)
- Journey to Shiloh (1968) as Greybeard
- Ironside (1968, TV Series) as Cal Bristold
- The Love Bug (1968) as Race Track Starter (uncredited)
- The Guns of Will Sonnett (1967–1969, TV Series) as Bartender
- The Outcasts (1969, TV Series) as Grainer
- The Big Valley (1965–1969, TV Series) as Clint
- Death Valley Days (1961–1969, TV Series) as Jack Alvord
- The Virginian (1962–1969, TV Series) as Donovan
- The Virginian (1970) as Sheriff Martin credit as Neil Russell
- The Computer Wore Tennis Shoes (1969) as Angelo
- Adam-12 (1969–1970, TV Series) as Johnson
- The Young Lawyers (1970, TV Series) as McCracken
- Yuma (1971, TV Movie) as Rol King (as Neil Russell)
- The Million Dollar Duck (1971) as Mr. Smith
- A Taste of Evil (1971, TV Movie) as Sheriff
- O'Hara, U.S. Treasury (1971, TV Series) as Bob Rasmussen
- Alias Smith and Jones (1972, TV Series) as Sheriff
- Longstreet (1972, TV Series) as Police Lieutenant
- Now You See Him, Now You Don't (1972) as Alfred
- Set This Town on Fire (1973, TV Movie) as Chuck
- The Mod Squad (1973, TV Series) as Kerner
- Satan's School for Girls (1973, TV Movie) as Sheriff
- Runaway! (1973, TV Movie) as Fireman
- Gunsmoke (1956–1974, TV Series) as Ed Shelby
- A Cry in the Wilderness (1974, TV Movie) as Mr. Griffey
- The Sex Symbol (1974, TV Movie) as Public Relations Man
- Death Sentence (1974, TV Movie) as Trooper
- The Rockford Files (1974, TV Series) as Lieutenant
- Mannix (1970–1974, TV Series) as George Enright
- The Apple Dumpling Gang (1975) as Herm Dally
- The Streets of San Francisco (1973–1975, TV Series) as Dan Riggs
- Emergency! (1973–1975, TV Series) as Captain Wilson
- Petrocelli (1975, TV Series) as John Miller
- Little House on the Prairie (1976, TV Series) as Len Coty
- The New Daughters of Joshua Cabe (1976, TV Movie)
- Arthur Hailey's the Moneychangers (1976, TV Mini-Series) as Timberwell
- The Loneliest Runner (1976, TV Movie) as Fred Dawkins
- Elvis (1979, TV Movie) as Vernon Presley
- Overboard (1987) as Sheriff Earl (Elk Cove)
- Sunset (1988) as Studio Guard
- Tango & Cash (1989) as Van Driver
- Dick Tracy (1990) as Club Ritz Patron #2
