= Pony Express (film) =

1953 film by Jerry Hopper

- Film poster
- Directed by: Jerry Hopper
- Screenplay by: Charles Marquis Warren
- Story by: Frank Gruber
- Produced by: Nat Holt
- Starring: Charlton Heston; Rhonda Fleming
- Cinematography: Ray Rennahan
- Edited by: Eda Warren
- Music by: Paul Sawtell
- Production company: Nat Holt Productions
- Distributed by: Paramount Pictures
- Release date: June 15, 1953
- Running time: 101 minutes
- Country: United States
- Language: English
- Box office: $1.4 million (US)

Pony Express is a 1953 American Western film directed by Jerry Hopper, filmed in Kanab, Utah, and starring Charlton Heston as Buffalo Bill, Forrest Tucker as Wild Bill Hickok, Jan Sterling as a Calamity Jane-type character, and Rhonda Fleming. The story is largely based on the 1925 silent film The Pony Express while the threat of a Californian secession is taken from Frontier Pony Express (1939).

The film is an historical account of the formation of the Pony Express rapid transcontinental mail delivery in the United States in 1860–1861. Although it gives no credit to the real founders of the Pony Express, Buffalo Bill Cody did ride for them, having signed up when he was 15 years old.

== Plot ==
In 1860, Buffalo Bill and Wild Bill Hickok join forces to establish a mail route from St. Joseph, Missouri, to Sacramento, California. On the way, they battle the weather, hostile Indians and California secessionists intent on shutting the operation down to encourage California to secede from the Union.

== Cast ==
- Charlton Heston as William Frederick 'Buffalo Bill' Cody
- Rhonda Fleming as Evelyn Hastings
- Forrest Tucker as Wild Bill Hickok
- Jan Sterling as Denny Russell
- Michael Moore as Rance Hastings
- Porter Hall as Jim Bridger
- Richard Shannon as Red Barrett
- Henry Brandon as Joe Cooper
- Stuart Randall as Pemberton
- Lewis Martin as Sergeant Russell
- Pat Hogan as Chief Yellow Hand
- Eric Alden as Miller
- Howard Joslin as Harvey

== Production ==
Charlton Heston did a film tie-in advertisement for Camel cigarettes.

Parts of the film were shot in Kanab Creek, Kanab movie fort, the Gap, and Johnson Canyon in Utah.

== See also ==
- Pony Express, TV series
