= Arrowhead (1953 film) =

1953 film by Charles Marquis Warren

- Charlton Heston and Katy Jurado
- Directed by: Charles Marquis Warren
- Screenplay by: Charles Marquis Warren
- Based on: Adobe Walls; 1953 novel by W.R.Burnett
- Produced by: Nat Holt
- Starring: Charlton Heston; Jack Palance; Katy Jurado; Brian Keith; Milburn Stone
- Cinematography: Ray Rennahan
- Edited by: Frank Bracht
- Music by: Paul Sawtell
- Distributed by: Paramount Pictures
- Release date: August 3, 1953
- Running time: 105 minutes
- Country: United States
- Language: English
- Box office: $1.2 million (US)

Arrowhead is a 1953 Western Technicolor film written and directed by Charles Marquis Warren (1912–1990), starring Charlton Heston, and featuring a supporting cast including Jack Palance, Katy Jurado, Brian Keith and Milburn Stone. The picture is based on the 1953 novel Adobe Walls by W. R. Burnett (1899–1982).

== Plot ==
Maverick scout Ed Bannon, a fictionalized depiction of real-life Army scout Al Sieber (1843–1907), is working with Army cavalry stationed at Fort Clark, near Brackettville, Texas. The United States Army Cavalry is trying to talk peace with the native Apaches and move them to reservations far to the East in Florida. Bannon's activities seem counterproductive to this new policy. Toriano, the son of the Apache chief, returns from an Eastern white education. Bannon is suspicious of his motives and their mutual distrust of each other is eventually resolved by single man combat.

== Cast ==
- Charlton Heston as Ed Bannon
- Jack Palance as Toriano
- Katy Jurado as Nita
- Brian Keith as Capt. Bill North
- Mary Sinclair as Lela Wilson
- Milburn Stone as Sandy MacKinnon
- Richard Shannon as Lt. Kirk
- Lewis Martin as Col. Weybright
- Frank DeKova as Chief Chattez
- Robert J. Wilke as Sgt. Stone
- Peter Coe as Spanish
- Kyle James as Jerry August
- John Pickard as John Gunther
- Pat Hogan as Jim Eagle
- Mike Ragan as Corporal Ives
