= Flight to Tangier =

1953 film by Charles Marquis Warren

- Directed by: Charles Marquis Warren
- Written by: Charles Marquis Warren
- Produced by: Nat Holt
- Starring: Joan Fontaine; Jack Palance; Corinne Calvet
- Cinematography: Ray Rennahan
- Edited by: Frank Bracht
- Music by: Paul Sawtell
- Production company: Nat Holt Productions
- Distributed by: Paramount Pictures
- Release date: November 21, 1953 (USA)
- Running time: 90 minutes
- Country: United States
- Language: English

Flight to Tangier is a 1953 American action film directed by Charles Marquis Warren and starring Joan Fontaine, Jack Palance, and Corinne Calvet. It was released by Paramount Pictures in Technicolor and 3-D.

This film also appeared in No Country for Old Men (2007) which, like Flight to Tangier, was then owned by Paramount Pictures (via Miramax and Paramount Vantage).

== Plot ==
Aboard a private plane, pilot Hank Brady pulls a gun on his lone passenger, Franz Kovaz, after putting the instruments on automatic pilot. Waiting at Tangier airport is another American pilot, Gil Walker, his French girlfriend Nicki and her companion Danzer, a woman named Susan Lane, and a police lieutenant, Luzon. The plane passes over the airport, then crashes and bursts into flames.

Captured by police while investigating the wreck, Gil and Susan are taken in to Luzon's superior, Col. Wier, for questioning. It is revealed that Gil had known Hank during the war and Susan had been engaged to him.

Suspicious characters follow them, led by Danzer, who forces his way into their car. It turns out Kovaz was carrying forged documents worth a great deal of money. Gil, Susan and Nicki are held by Danzer's men, but they are found by the police, led by Luzon, who is shot and killed. Gil escapes.

Gil ends up on the run, suspected of murder, and not sure whom to trust. The plot thickens when both Hank and Kovaz turn up, having parachuted to safety from the plane. In a final confrontation, Hank and Susan are both revealed to be US government agents, working undercover. Hank is killed. During a gunfight, most of the gang, and Nicki, are killed. Gil is free to go, and he and Susan board the same plane to America.

== Cast ==
- Joan Fontaine as Susan Lane
- Jack Palance as Gil Walker
- Corinne Calvet as Nicki
- Robert Douglas as Danzer
- Marcel Dalio as Goro
- Jeff Morrow as Colonel C.M. Wier
- Richard Shannon as Lieutenant Bill Luzon
- Murray Matheson as Franz Kovaz
- John Doucette as Tirera
- John Pickard as Hank Brady
- James K Anderson as Dullah
- Peter Coe as Hanrah
- John Wengraf as Kalferez
- Bob Templeton as Luzon's Policeman
