= Ray Rennahan =

American cinematographer

- Born: May 1, 1896; Las Vegas, Nevada
- Died: May 19, 1980 (aged 84); Tarzana, California
- Occupation: cinematographer
- Title: A.S.C.
- Board member of: A.S.C. President (1950–1951), (1965–1966)
- Awards: Hollywood Walk of Fame, Academy Award for Color Cinematography; Gone with the Wind 1940; Blood and Sand 1941

Ray Rennahan, A.S.C. (May 1, 1896 – May 19, 1980) was a motion picture cinematographer.

== Biography ==
For his work in films, he became one of the only six cinematographers to have a "star" on the Hollywood Walk of Fame, the other five being Haskell Wexler, Conrad L. Hall, J. Peverell Marley, Leon Shamroy and Hal Mohr.

He won two Academy Awards for Color Cinematography, for Gone with the Wind, with Ernest Haller in 1940, and Blood and Sand, with Ernest Palmer in 1942. He was also nominated in that category for Down Argentine Way in 1941, with Leon Shamroy; The Blue Bird in 1941, with Arthur Miller; Louisiana Purchase in 1942, with Harry Hallenberger; For Whom the Bell Tolls in 1944; and Lady in the Dark in 1945.

== Selected filmography ==
- Blood Test (1923)
- The Ten Commandments (1923)
- The Merry Widow (1925)
- Gold Diggers of Broadway (1929)
- The Vagabond King (1930)
- King of Jazz (1930)
- Whoopee! (1930)
- The Runaround (1931)
- Fanny Foley Herself (1931)
- Doctor X (1932)
- Mystery of the Wax Museum (1933)
- The Cat and the Fiddle (1934)
- Kid Millions (1934)
- Becky Sharp (1935)
- Ebb Tide (1937)
- Wings of the Morning (1937)
- Vogues of 1938 (1938)
- Kentucky (1938)
- Her Jungle Love (1938)
- Drums Along the Mohawk (1939)
- Gone with the Wind (1939)
- Chad Hanna (1940)
- Down Argentine Way (1940)
- The Blue Bird (1940)
- Blood and Sand (1941)
- Belle Starr (1941)
- That Night in Rio (1941)
- Louisiana Purchase (1941)
- For Whom the Bell Tolls (1943)
- Lady in the Dark (1944)
- The Three Caballeros (1944)
- Belle of the Yukon (1944)
- Up in Arms (1944)
- Incendiary Blonde (1945)
- It's a Pleasure (1945)
- A Thousand and One Nights (1945)
- Duel in the Sun (1946)
- California (1947)
- The Perils of Pauline (1947)
- Unconquered (1947)
- Whispering Smith (1948)
- The Paleface (1948)
- A Connecticut Yankee in King Arthur's Court (1949)
- Streets of Laredo (1949)
- The White Tower (1950)
- Silver City (1951)
- The Great Missouri Raid (1951)
- Warpath (1951)
- Flaming Feather (1952)
- At Sword's Point (1952)
- Denver and Rio Grande (1952)
- Hurricane Smith (1952)
- Arrowhead (1953)
- Flight to Tangier (1953)
- Pony Express (1953)
- Stranger on Horseback (1955)
- Rage at Dawn (1955)
- Texas Lady (1955)
- A Lawless Street (1955)
- The Court Jester (1955)
- 7th Cavalry (1956)
- The Guns of Fort Petticoat (1957)
- The Halliday Brand (1957)
- Terror in a Texas Town (1958)
