= Richard Shannon (actor) =

American film and television actor (1920–1989)

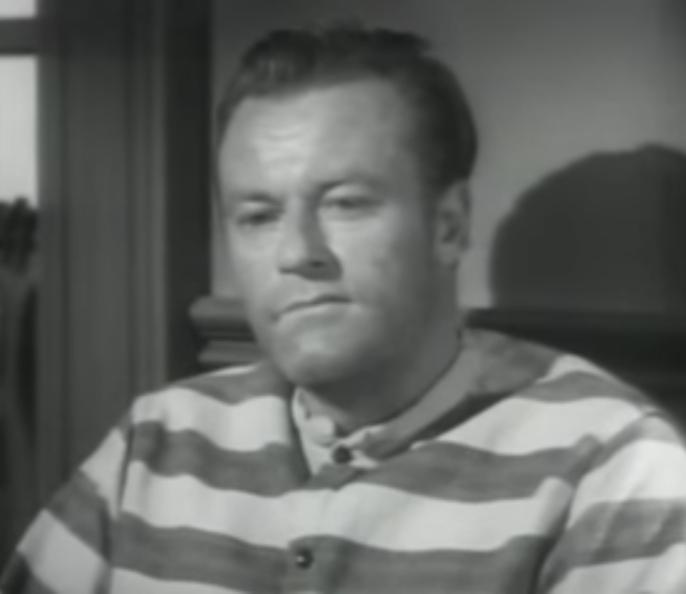
- Shannon in The Deputy, 1961
- Born: Richard Esberry Mangan; July 25, 1920; San Francisco, California, U.S.
- Died: December 2, 1989 (aged 69); Astoria, Oregon, U.S.
- Occupations: Film and television actor
- Years active: 1953–1963

Richard Esberry Mangan (July 25, 1920 – December 2, 1989) was an American film and television actor. He appeared in over 70 films and television programs, and was known for playing the role of Buck Henderson in the 1957 film The Tin Star.

== Partial filmography ==
- The Girls of Pleasure Island (1953) − Captain McKendry (uncredited)
- Pony Express (1953) − Red Barrett
- The Vanquished (1953) − Lieutenant Adams (uncredited)
- Houdini (1953) − Miner (uncredited)
- Arrowhead (1953) − Lieutenant Kirk
- Flight to Tangier (1953) − Lieutenant Bill Luzon
- Forever Female (1953) − Stage Manager
- Alaska Seas (1954) − Tom Erickson
- White Christmas (1954) − Joe the Adjutant Captain (uncredited)
- The Bridges at Toko-Ri (1954) − Lieutenant Olds
- Strategic Air Command (1955) − Flight Instructor Pilot
- Conquest of Space (1955) − Crewman (uncredited)
- The Seven Little Foys (1955) − Stage Manager
- Artists and Models (1955) − Secret Service Agent Rogers
- That Certain Feeling (1956) − Cab Driver (uncredited)
- The Leather Saint (1956) − Tom Kelly
- The Proud and Profane (1956) − Major
- The Vagabond King (1956) − Sergeant (uncredited)
- Spring Reunion (1956) − Nick
- Beau James (1957) − Dick Jackson
- Trooper Hook (1957) − Trooper Ryan
- The Tin Star (1957) − Buck Henderson
- Ride Out for Revenge (1957) − Garvin
- Ride a Violent Mile (1957) − Sam
- Kiss Them for Me (1957) − War Correspondent (uncredited)
- Cattle Empire (1958) − Garth
- The Space Children (1958) − Lieutenant Colonel Alan Manley
- Have Gun - Will Travel (1958) (Season 2 Episode 15: "Moor's Revenge") - Ben Jackson
- Desert Hell (1958) − Pvt. Hoffstetter
- The Trap (1959) − Len Karger
- Don't Give Up the Ship (1959) − Cmdr. Cross
- The Jayhawkers! (1959) − Townsman
- Steve Canyon (1959) − TV Series, Episode "The Korean Story" as Capt. Vinnie Jones
- Heller in Pink Tights (1960) − Man at Desk (uncredited)
- The Proper Time (1962) − Dr. Polery
- The Alfred Hitchcock Hour (1962) (Season 1 Episode 11: "Ride the Nightmare") − Steve
