= The Black Whip =

1956 film by Charles Marquis Warren

- Film poster
- Directed by: Charles Marquis Warren
- Screenplay by: Orville Hampton
- Story by: Orville Hampton
- Produced by: Robert Kraushaar
- Starring: Hugh Marlowe; Coleen Gray
- Cinematography: Joseph F. Biroc
- Music by: Raoul Kraushaar
- Color process: Black and white
- Production company: Regal Films
- Distributed by: 20th Century Fox
- Release date: December 1956
- Running time: 78 minutes
- Country: United States
- Language: English

The Black Whip is a 1956 American Civil War Western film directed by Charles Marquis Warren and starring Hugh Marlowe and Coleen Gray.

The film brief describes the film as "two brothers rescue four dance-hall girls, and encounter trouble from a villain wielding a wicked whip".

The film depicts the time as April 1867, when post-war derelicts, plunderers, and looters continue their crazed violence out west. The story and screenplay were written by Orville Hampton.

Sets from the Gunsmoke TV series were used.

== Plot ==
John Murdock (Paul Richards) is a notorious outlaw who leads the vicious gang known as the Blacklegs. Armed with his signature black whip, he and his men invade a small town, looking to stir up trouble. In between harassing the girls at the saloon and attacking the locals, the Blacklegs are plotting a bigger scheme: kidnapping the governor of Kentucky (Patrick O'Moore) and holding him for ransom. The only man who stands in their way is former Confederate officer Lorn Crowford (Hugh Marlowe).

== Cast ==
- Hugh Marlowe as Lorn Crawford
- Coleen Gray as Jeannie
- Adele Mara as Ruthie Dawson
- Angie Dickinson as Sally Morrow
- Richard Gilden as Dewey Crawford
- Paul Richards as John Murdock
- John Pickard as Sheriff Persons
- Dorothy Schuyler as Delilah Ware
- Charles H. Gray as Chick Hainline (as Charles Gray)
- Sheb Wooley as Bill Lassater
- Strother Martin as Thorny
- Harry Landers as Fiddler
- Patrick O'Moore as Governor
- William Hamel as Constable
- Duane Grey as Deputy Floyd (as Duane Thorsen)
- Rush Williams Jailer Garner
- Howard Culver as Dr. Gillette
- Sid Cutis as Bartender
