= Charles H. Gray =

American actor

- Gray in Junior Bonner (1972)
- Born: November 27, 1921; St. Louis, Missouri, U.S.
- Died: August 2, 2008 (aged 86); Joshua Tree, San Bernardino County, California, U.S.
- Occupation: Actor
- Years active: 1942–1979

Charles H. Gray (November 27, 1921 – August 2, 2008) was an American television and film actor.

Gray was best known for his work in the TV series Highway Patrol as Officer Edwards, trail scout Clay Forrester in Rawhide and as William "Bill" Foster, Sr. in the soap opera The Young and the Restless.

Beginning in mostly small uncredited roles in films by the middle 1950s, Gray acted primarily in Western TV series: The Life and Legend of Wyatt Earp, Gunsmoke, Black Saddle, The Texan, Yancy Derringer, Dick Powell's Zane Grey Theatre, Have Gun - Will Travel, Riverboat, Death Valley Days, Gunslinger, Laredo, The Road West, Iron Horse, The High Chaparral, The Virginian, The Men From Shiloh (rebranded name for The Virginian), Bearcats!, Bonanza and Alias Smith and Jones. He also appeared in many TV movies.

== Filmography ==
Year	Title	Role	Notes
1942	Tales of Manhattan	Rod	Uncredited
1955	One Desire	Vernon's son	Uncredited
1956	The Houston Story	Don Stokes	Uncredited
1956	Tension at Table Rock	Zecca	Uncredited
1956	The Black Whip	Chick Hainline	
1957	Trooper Hook	Soldier	
1957	God Is My Partner	Ross Newmani-Reporter	Uncredited
1957	The Unknown Terror	Jim Wheatley	
1957	Ride a Violent Mile	Dory	
1958	Cattle Empire	Tom Powis	
1958	Desert Hell	Pvt. Bandurski	
1958	I Want to Live!	Luke	Uncredited
1969	Charro!	Mody	
1971	Wild Rovers	Savage	
1971	Bless the Beasts & Children	Captain Cotton	
1971	The Organization	Night Watchman	
1972	Junior Bonner	Burt	
1972	The New Centurions	Bethel	
1973	Sleeper	Laboratory Security Guard	Uncredited
1979	Prophecy	Sheriff	(final film role)

== Television ==
Year	Title	Role	Notes
1957	Leave It to Beaver	Harry Donaldson	S1:E5, "New Neighbours"
1959	Rawhide	Flagg	S1:E10, "Incident of the Golden Calf"
1959	Rawhide	Flagg	S2:E8, "Incident of the Haunted Hills"
1961-1962	Rawhide	Clay Forrester	S4:14 Episodes
1962-1963	Rawhide	Clay Forrester	S5:31 Episodes
