= Ride a Violent Mile =

1957 film by Charles Marquis Warren

- Theatrical release poster
- Directed by: Charles Marquis Warren
- Screenplay by: Eric Norden
- Story by: Charles Marquis Warren
- Produced by: Robert Stabler
- Starring: John Agar; Penny Edwards; John Pickard; Bing Russell; Richard Shannon; Charles H. Gray
- Cinematography: Brydon Baker
- Edited by: Leslie Vidor
- Music by: Raoul Kraushaar
- Production companies: Regal Films Inc; Emirau Productions
- Distributed by: 20th Century Fox
- Release date: November 24, 1957
- Running time: 80 minutes
- Country: United States
- Language: English

Ride a Violent Mile is a 1957 American Western film directed by Charles Marquis Warren and written by Eric Norden. The film stars John Agar, Penny Edwards, John Pickard, Bing Russell, Richard Shannon and Charles H. Gray. The film was released on November 24, 1957, by 20th Century Fox.

== Plot ==
A stranger in town, Jeff Donner, intervenes when dancehall girl Susan Crowley is accosted by two men. He then discovers a man's mortally wounded body, listens to his last words, then is arrested for murder by Thorne, the new marshal.

Susan helps him get away and confides to Donner that she is actually a Union Army undercover operative. She says the dead man was to deliver a coded message to her, but was killed while she was being roughed up by the two cowboys. Donner repeats what the man said, which Susan is to pass along to a Cavalry officer. A man named Norman murders the officer and pretends to be him, then takes Susan captive.

Donner, discovering that the man's coded message involves a Confederate plot to rustle cattle and seize advantageous land, confronts Thorne, who's in league with the rebels. He is successful and rescues Susan as well.

== Cast ==
- John Agar as Jeff Donner
- Penny Edwards as Susan Crowley
- John Pickard as Marshal James Thorne
- Bing Russell as Corporal Norman
- Richard Shannon as Sam
- Charles H. Gray as Dory
- Sheb Wooley as Jonathan Long
- Rush Williams as Edwards
- Richard Gilden as Francisco Gomez
- Rocky Shahan as Outlaw

== Production ==
The film was produced by Charles Marquess Warren's Emirau Productions.

Filming started in June 1957.
