= Lewis Martin (actor) =

American actor

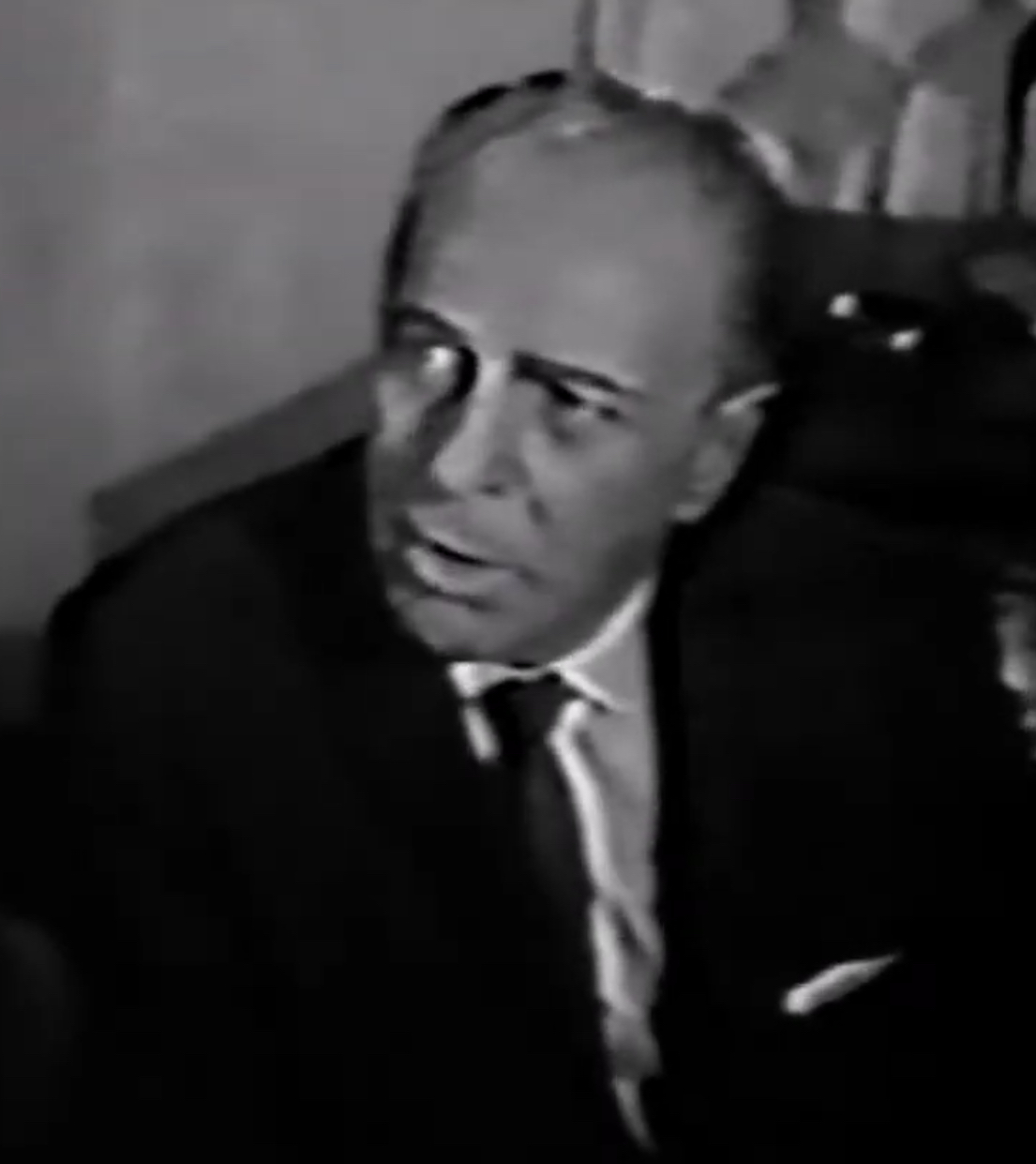
- Martin in an episode of Lock-Up (1959)
- Born: November 1, 1894; Berkeley, California
- Died: February 21, 1969 (aged 73); Los Angeles, California, U.S.
- Occupation: Actor
- Years active: 1925–1967
- Spouse: Helen Brooks (m. 1931)

Lewis Martin (November 1, 1894 – February 21, 1969) was an American actor.

== Biography ==
Lewis Martin was born in Berkeley, California. He was the son of Mr. and Mrs. John Martin.

He made his first Broadway appearance during 1925 in the play Lucky Sam McCarver. His career on Broadway was long and successful, he appeared in over 16 plays between 1925 and 1950. His film and television career started in 1950 with a supporting role in the Kraft Television Theatre. His first film was The Blazing Sun. He played supporting roles in films like The War of the Worlds (as Pastor Collins), The Court Jester (as Sir Finsdale) and Diary of a Madman (as Father Raymonde). Martin often played respectable figures like police officers, military men, judges or priests.

Martin also appeared in numerous television series of the 1950s and 1960s, including Judge Libbott in four episodes of Perry Mason and Professor Henderson in three episodes of The George Burns and Gracie Allen Show. His last role was Commissioner West in two episodes of Tarzan in 1967.

He married actress Helen Brooks on July 12, 1931, in Greenwich, Connecticut.

== Filmography ==
- The Blazing Sun (1950) - Engineer (uncredited)
- Experiment Alcatraz (1950) - Asst. District Attorney Walton
- Counterspy Meets Scotland Yard (1950) - Hugo Borne
- Operation Pacific (1951) - Squad Commander
- Three Guys Named Mike (1951) - C.R. Smith
- Ace in the Hole (1951) - McCardle
- Cattle Drive (1951) - Winston (uncredited)
- Criminal Lawyer (1951) - Judge A.T. Selders (uncredited)
- Drums in the Deep South (1951) - Gen. Johnston
- The Whip Hand (1951) - Peterson
- The Blue Veil (1951) - Archbishop (uncredited)
- The Wild North (1952) - Sergeant
- Red Planet Mars (1952) - Dr. Mitchell - Astronomer (uncredited)
- Sudden Fear (1952) - Bill, the Play Director (uncredited)
- Angel Face (1953) - Police Sergeant (uncredited)
- The War of the Worlds (1953) - Pastor Dr. Matthew Collins
- Pony Express (1953) - Sgt. Russell
- Houdini (1953) - Editor (uncredited)
- Fort Algiers (1953) - Colonel Lasalle
- Vice Squad (1953) - Police Lt. Ed Chisolm
- No Escape (1953) - Police Lt. Bruce Gunning
- Arrowhead (1953) - Col. Weybright
- The Caddy (1953) - Mr. Taylor
- Knock on Wood (1954) - Inspector Cranford
- Witness to Murder (1954) - Psychiatrist
- Prisoner of War (1954) - General (uncredited)
- Men of the Fighting Lady (1954) - Comdr. Michael Coughlin
- Cry Vengeance (1954) - Nick Buda
- Las Vegas Shakedown (1955) - Frank Collins
- The Seven Little Foys (1955) - Episcopal Minister (uncredited)
- Night Freight (1955) - Crane
- The Court Jester (1955) - Sir Finsdale
- The Man Who Knew Too Much (1956) - Detective (uncredited)
- Star in the Dust (1956) - Pastor Harris
- These Wilder Years (1956) - Dr. Miller
- The Quiet Gun (1957) - Steven Hardy
- Slander (1957) - Charles Orrin Sterling
- The Last Stagecoach West (1957) - Ben Hardy
- Rockabilly Baby (1957) - Mayor Howard Hoffman
- Crash Landing (1958) - Maurice Stanley
- Badman's Country (1958) - (uncredited)
- A Summer Place (1959) - Doctor (uncredited)
- The Runaway (1961) - Captain Dawn - U.S. Customs
- Diary of a Madman (1963) - Father Raymonde
