= Paul Brinegar =

American actor

Paul Alden Brinegar
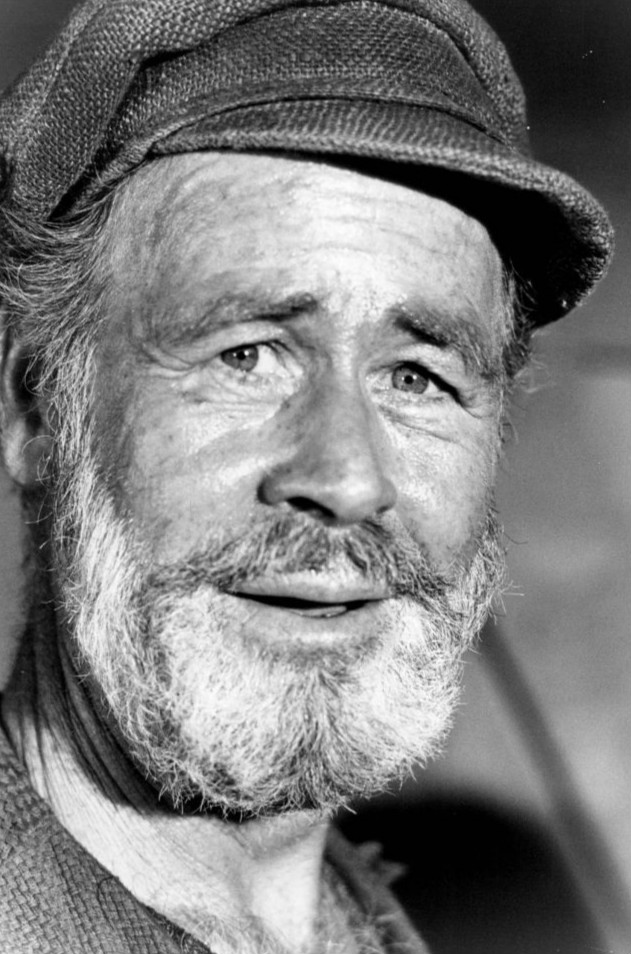
- Brinegar (1968)
- Born: Paul Alden Brinegar Jr. December 19, 1917; Tucumcari, New Mexico, U.S.
- Died: March 27, 1995 (aged 77); Los Angeles, California, U.S.
- Years active: 1946–1994
- Spouse(s): Shirley Talbott (1962-1995) (his death, 2 children)
- Children: 2

Paul Alden Brinegar Jr. (December 19, 1917 – March 27, 1995) was an American character actor best known for his roles in three Western series: The Life and Legend of Wyatt Earp, Rawhide, and Lancer.

== Early years ==
Brinegar was born in 1917 in Tucumcari in eastern New Mexico, the first child of Louise (née McElroy) and Paul A. Brinegar Sr., who was a farmer. His family relocated several times during his childhood, first moving to Alamogordo, then to Las Cruces, and finally to Santa Fe. In Santa Fe, Brinegar became interested in acting, performing in stage productions at his local high school.

After his graduation in 1935, Brinegar left Santa Fe to attend Pasadena Junior College in California. There, he studied drama, literature, and art. According to the United States Census of 1940, he was back in Santa Fe by May of that year, living with his parents and his two younger brothers, Warren and Robert.

The 1940 census also identifies him at that time as an independent "writer" and his father then as a freelancing "general short-hand reporter". Soon thereafter, young Brinegar joined the United States Navy to serve four years during World War II as a Chief Radioman in the South Pacific. After the war, he returned to California, where he applied his military training and experience to earn a living in the Los Angeles area as a radio repairman. He also resumed his pursuit of an acting career in his spare time, playing bit parts in movies.

== Career ==
Brinegar's first credited appearance in a feature film was in Larceny (1948). From there, he launched a steady film career that slowed considerably in the late 1950s, after he began appearing on television, but did not end until 1994, when Brinegar made his final screen appearance, as a stagecoach driver, in the 1994 film version of Maverick.

Brinegar was cast in more than 100 Western films produced between 1946 and 1994, often specializing in playing "feisty, grizzled cowboy sidekicks". On television, from 1956 to 1958, he played James H. "Dog" Kelley, the mayor of Dodge City, Kansas, in the ABC/Desilu series The Life and Legend of Wyatt Earp starring Hugh O'Brian. Brinegar appears in that series 33 times as Kelley and in one other episode in another role. He also portrays Ludwig, a bartender, in the 1959 episode "The Ringer" of The Texan starring Rory Calhoun. Brinegar, however, is best remembered as the cattle-drive cook George Washington Wishbone on the CBS series Rawhide (1959–1966). Earlier, he had played a similar role, as the character Tom Jefferson Jeffrey, in the 1958 movie Cattle Empire upon which Rawhide was based.

Brinegar also made two guest appearances on CBS courtroom drama Perry Mason. His first appearance on that series, prior to Rawhide, is in the 1958 episode "The Case of the Sun Bather's Diary". His second appearance on Perry Mason is in the series' ninth and final season, in the 1966 episode "The Case of the Unwelcome Well".

In the 1968–1970 CBS Western series Lancer, Brinegar had the role of Jelly Hoskins; and in 1969 he appeared in Charro! starring Elvis Presley. Then, in 1973, he played the barman in Clint Eastwood's film High Plains Drifter. From 1982 to 1983, returning to television, Brinegar portrayed a humorous cowboy-like character, Lamar Pettybone, during the first season of the ABC series Matt Houston. Later, he reprised a revised version of his Rawhide Wishbone character for the 1991 TV movie The Gambler Returns: The Luck of the Draw, in which he delivers a brief monologue that contains references to several old television Westerns.

== Death ==
Brinegar died of emphysema at the age of 77 in Los Angeles on March 27, 1995.

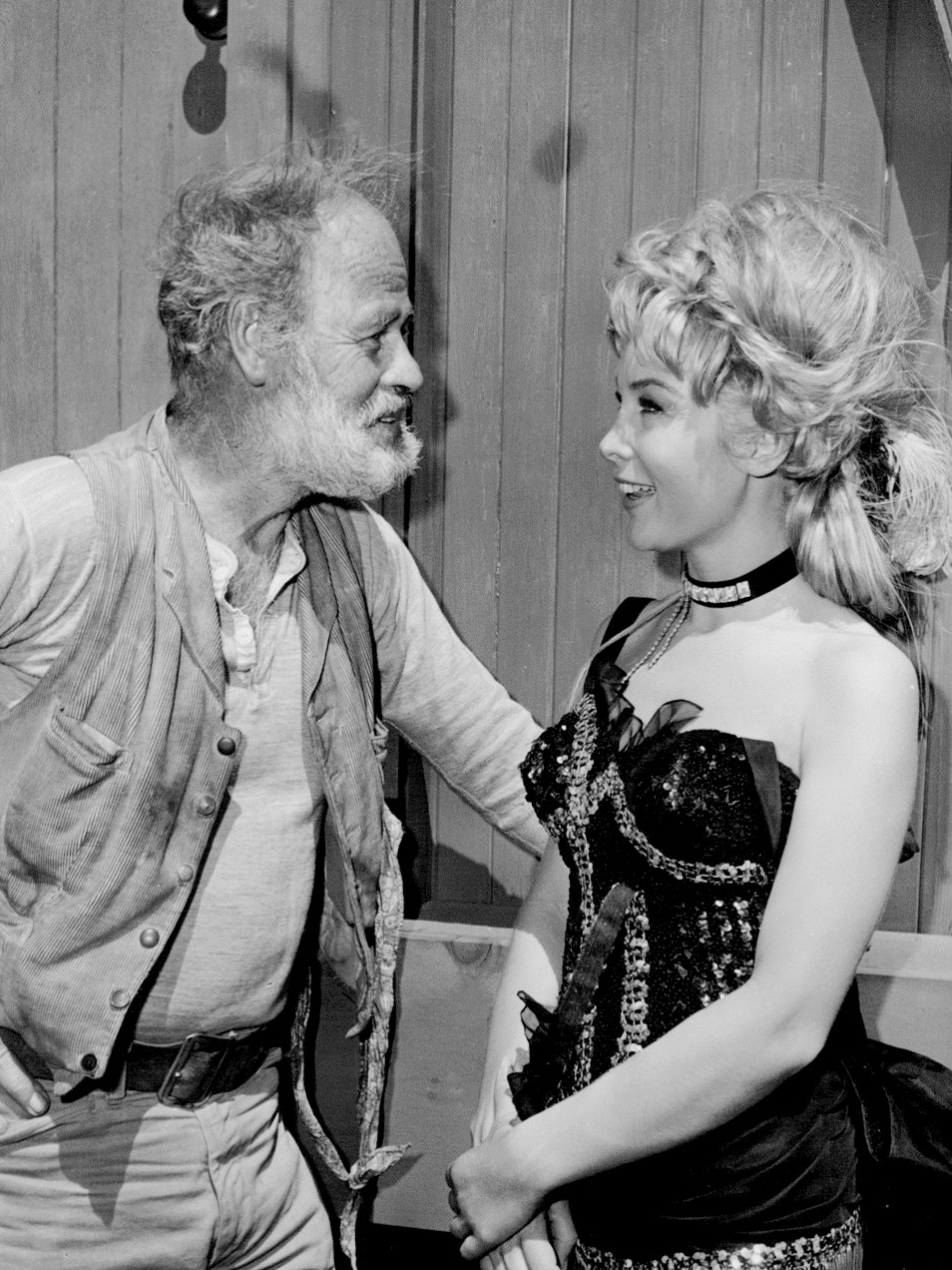
Brinegar with guest star Barbara Eden in a 1964 episode of Rawhide.

== Filmography ==
=== TV and film roles ===
(Non-Western roles included)

- Abilene Town (1946) - Gambler (uncredited)
- Larceny (1948) - Mechanic
- Take One False Step (1949) - Reporter (uncredited)
- Sword in the Desert (1949) - British Soldier (uncredited)
- Pinky (1949) - Western Union Clerk (uncredited)
- The Gal Who Took the West (1949) - Tailor (uncredited)
- Young Man with a Horn (1950) - Stage Manager (uncredited)
- A Ticket to Tomahawk (1950) - Henchman (uncredited)
- Storm Warning (1951) - Cameraman #1 (uncredited)
- Insurance Investigator (1951) - Mr. Spangler, Hotel Orderly (uncredited)
- Journey Into Light (1951) - Bum
- Here Come the Nelsons (1952) - Thin Cop (uncredited)
- The Captive City (1952) - Police Sergeant
- Pat and Mike (1952) - Caddy (uncredited)
- We're Not Married! (1952) - Beauty Contest Spectator (uncredited)
- It Happens Every Thursday (1953) - Mr. Sweetzer, Hotel Clerk (uncredited)
- Fast Company (1953) - Smokey - Poker Player (uncredited)
- Captain Scarface (1953) - Clegg
- So Big (1953) - Farmer (uncredited)
- Phantom of the Rue Morgue (1954) - Angry Accuser in Street (uncredited)
- Rails Into Laramie (1954) - Bandleader (uncredited)
- The Rocket Man (1954) - Dave Harris (uncredited)
- Human Desire (1954) - Brakeman (uncredited)
- Dawn at Socorro (1954) - Desk Clerk
- Rogue Cop (1954) - Arcade Clerk (uncredited)
- A Star Is Born (1954) - Man at Funeral (uncredited)
- Four Guns to the Border (1954) - Barber (uncredited)
- The Silver Chalice (1954) - Audience Member (uncredited)
- The Public Defender (1954-1955, TV Series) - Bud / Vic Oliver / Bailbondsman
- Cell 2455 Death Row (1955) - Prisoner (uncredited)
- I Died a Thousand Times (1955) - Bus Driver (uncredited)
- Highway Patrol (1955, TV Series) - Blainey
- Ransom! (1956) - Bank Clerk (uncredited)
- Inside Detroit (1956) - Irate Worker (uncredited)
- Tales of the Texas Rangers (1956, TV series) - Hobo
- Cheyenne (1956, TV series)
  - (Season 2 Episode 7: "Lone Gun") - Slim Mantell
- World Without End (1956) - Vida (uncredited)
- Santiago (1956) - Alkali (uncredited)
- Fighting Trouble (1956) - Mailman (uncredited)
- Flight to Hong Kong (1956) - Castairs (uncredited)
- Noah's Ark (1957, TV series) - Doug Connor
- The Spirit of St. Louis (1957) - Okie (uncredited)
- Alfred Hitchcock Presents (1955–1957, TV series)
  - (Season 1 Episode 2: "Premonition") (1955) - Mason
  - (Season 1 Episode 27: "Help Wanted") (1956) - Police Officer
  - (Season 2 Episode 31: "The Night the World Ended") (1957) - Mr. Stern
- The Iron Sheriff (1957) - Gun Salesman (uncredited)
- Tales of Wells Fargo (1957, TV series) - Shorty Tannin
- The Vampire (1957) - Willy Warner
- Hell on Devil's Island (1957) - Arneaux (uncredited)
- Copper Sky (1957) - Charlie Martin
- Perry Mason (1958) - Tom Sackett
- Cattle Empire (1958) - Tom Jefferson Jeffrey
- State Trooper (1958, TV series) - Storekeeper
- The Life and Legend of Wyatt Earp (1955-1958, TV series) - Mayor Jim Kelley
- How to Make a Monster (1958) - Rivero
- Lawman (1959, TV series) - George the Stage Line Clerk
- The Texan (1959, TV series) - Ludwig
- Trackdown (1959, TV series) - Deputy Zack Armstead
- Peter Gunn (1961, TV series) - Chigger
- Rawhide (1959-1965, TV series) - George Washington Wishbone
- Country Boy (1966) - Link Byrd Sr., the father of Nashville musician played by Randy Boone
- Bonanza (1967, TV series) - Lev Buckalew
- Iron Horse (1967, TV series) - Waco Hobson
- Daniel Boone (1967, TV series) - Gurney
- The Guns of Will Sonnett (1968, TV series) - Charlie Moss
- Lancer (1968-1970, TV series) - Jelly Hoskins
- Charro! (1969) - Opie Keetch
- Death Valley Days (1966–1969, TV Series) - James "Jimmy" Dayton / Rupert Johnson / Sawbuck - Prospector
- High Plains Drifter (1973) - Lutie Naylor
- Emergency! (1974–1976, TV series) - Max / Grady / Husband (Tom)
- Cannon (1974, TV series) - Charlie Tompkins
- The Six Million Dollar Man (1975, TV series) - Rafe Morris
- I Wonder Who's Killing Her Now? (1975) - Looney Pickup Driver
- CHiPs (1977–1982, TV series) - Keith Lawton / Old Surfer
- The Dukes of Hazzard (1979, TV series) - Dewey Stovall
- The Texas Rangers (1981, TV movie) - Old Al
- The Creature Wasn't Nice (1983) - Clint Eastwood / Dirty Harry
- Chattanooga Choo Choo (1984) - Pee Wee
- Annihilator (1986, TV movie) - Pops
- Life Stinks (1991) - Old Bellboy
- The Adventures of Brisco County, Jr. (1993, TV series) - Francis Killbridge
- Maverick (1994) - Stage Driver
