= Trooper Hook =

1957 film by Charles Marquis Warren

- Theatrical release poster
- Directed by: Charles Marquis Warren
- Screenplay by: David Victor; Martin Berkeley; Herbert Little, Jr.
- Story by: Jack Schaefer
- Based on: His short story
- Produced by: Sol Baer Fielding
- Starring: Joel McCrea; Barbara Stanwyck
- Cinematography: Ellsworth Fredricks
- Edited by: Fred W. Berger
- Music by: Gerald Fried
- Production companies: Filmaster Productions; Sol Bear Fielding
- Distributed by: United Artists
- Release date: July 12, 1957
- Running time: 82 minutes
- Country: United States
- Language: English

Trooper Hook is a 1957 American Western film directed by Charles Marquis Warren and starring Joel McCrea as the title character and Barbara Stanwyck as the woman he frees from the Indians. The fact that during her captivity she has had a son by a much-feared chief makes her situation very difficult.

== Plot ==
Led by First Sergeant Clovis Hook, the US cavalry captures Apache warriors and torches an Apache village, rounding up the women and children. Cora Sutliff, an unresponsive and silent white woman, is spotted among the prisoners. Cora had been taken captive in a raid nine years before, while travelling to join her rancher husband, Fred. She has a child named Quito. The cavalrymen return to their fort with Cora and the prisoners. Among the prisoners is Apache Chief Nanchez, Quito's father.

Most women at the fort are unsympathetic toward Cora, reasoning that any sane white woman would prefer suicide to being "defiled" by an Indian. Hook is assigned to escort Cora and Quito to Cora's husband. While Hook arranges for their stagecoach tickets, Cora and Quito wait at the general store. A man insults mother and son, grabbing Quito. Cora hits the man with a shovel, threatening to kill anyone who lays hands on Quito, the first words she has spoken since her rescue. Hook arrives and they set off on a stagecoach.

At a picnic rest stop, Cora asks Hook if he can understand wanting to live so much that you will put up with any humiliation. Hook reveals that as a prisoner of war in the Confederate prison at Andersonville, he pretended to be a dog for a month so a dog-loving prisoner, dying and hallucinating with fever, would share his rations with him.

Meanwhile, Nanchez escapes, rounds up Apache warriors, and begins tracking the stage. The stagecoach picks up and drops off other passengers, including young Jeff Bennett, whom everyone calls "Cowboy". Others include Señora Sandoval, a Spanish aristocrat, and her granddaughter, Consuela, on her way to an arranged marriage. Rancher Charlie Travers eventually boards, flush with money won in a poker game.

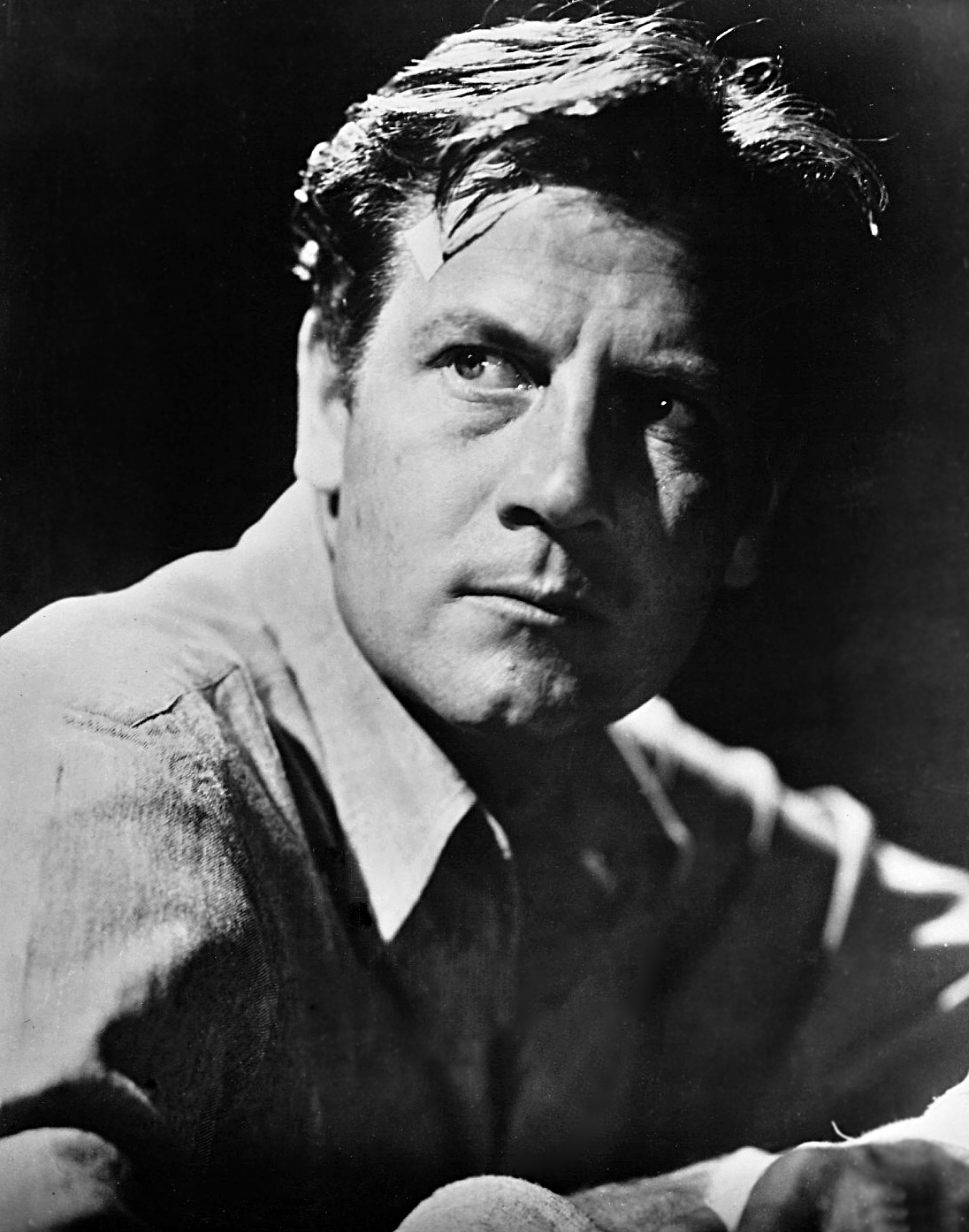
Joel McCrea plays Sgt. Clovis Hook, assigned to escort Cora Sutcliff and her son to join Cora’s rancher husband.

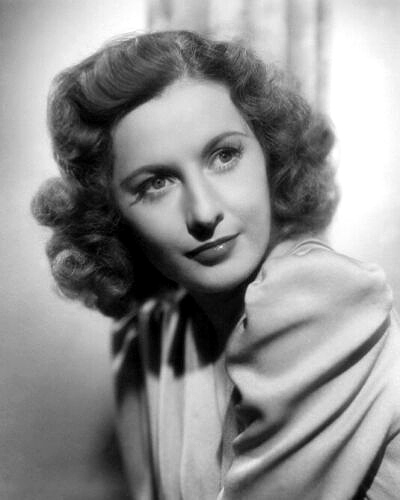
Barbara Stanwyck plays Cora Sutliff, taken captive 9 years before, while on her way to her husband. Cora has a son, Quito, by Nanchez.

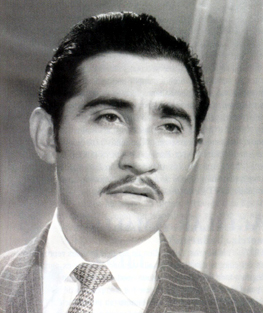
Rodolfo Acosta plays Chief Nanchez, who escapes custody, rounds up Apache warriors, and demands his son.

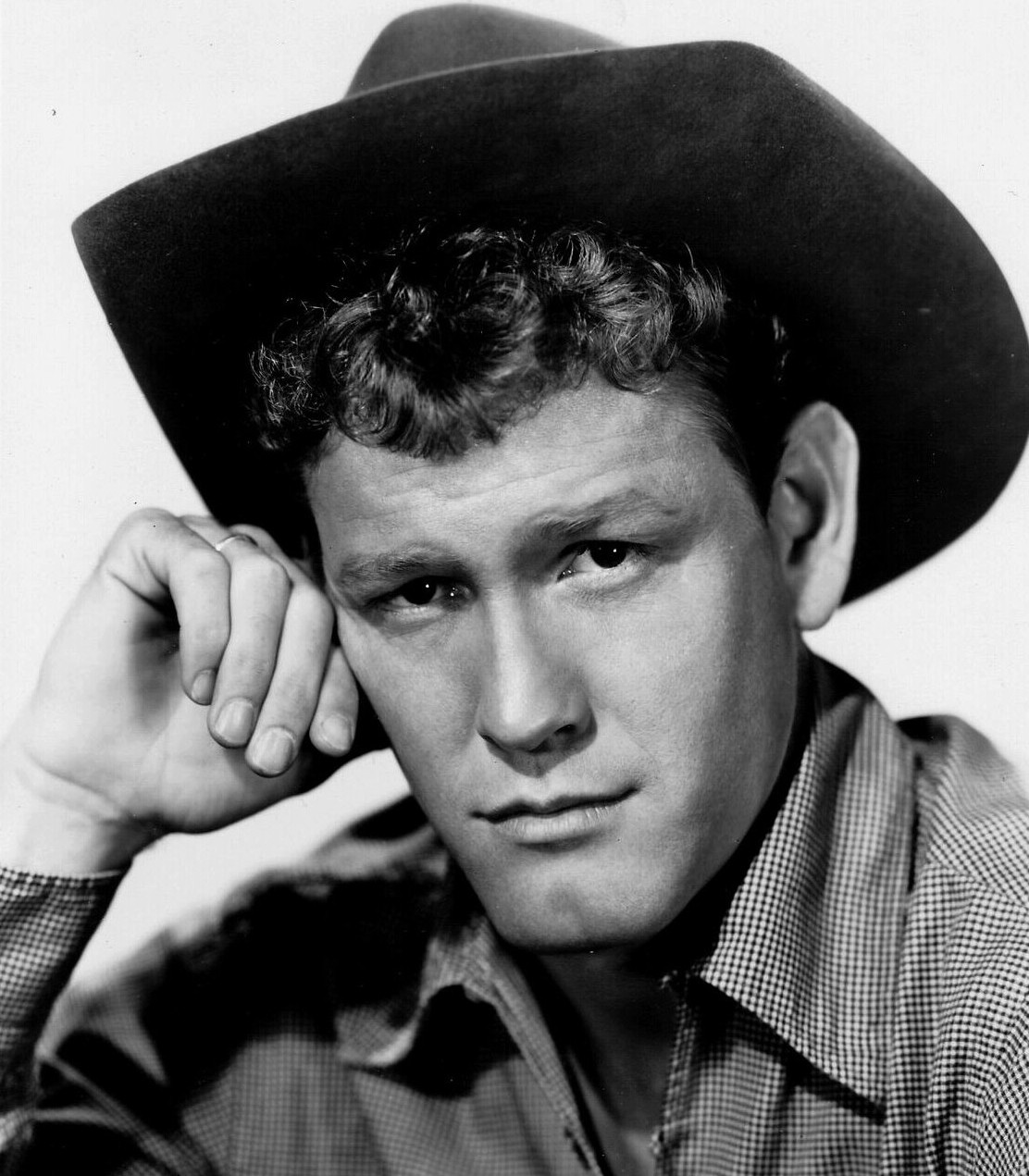
Earl Holliman plays "Cowboy", who helps protect the travelers from the Apaches.

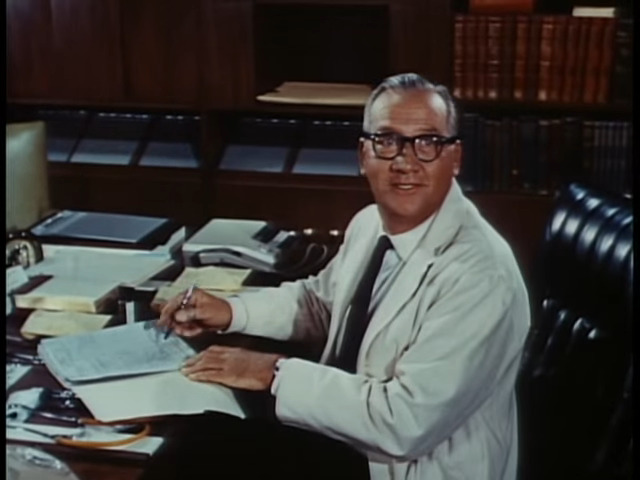
Edward Andrews plays Charlie Travers, a rancher who offers Cora money to surrender Quito.

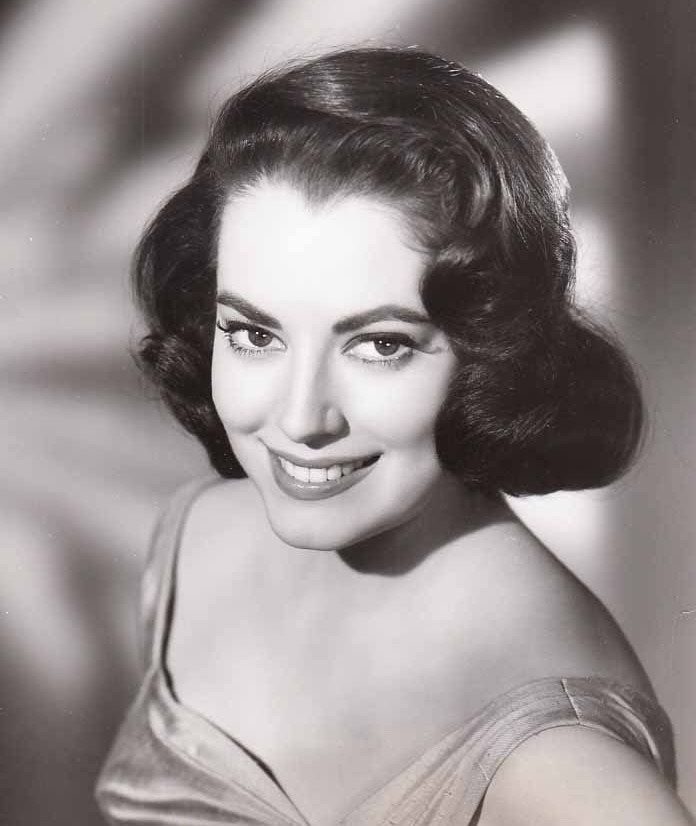
Susan Kohner plays Consuela, who on her way to an arranged marriage, becomes attracted to Cowboy.

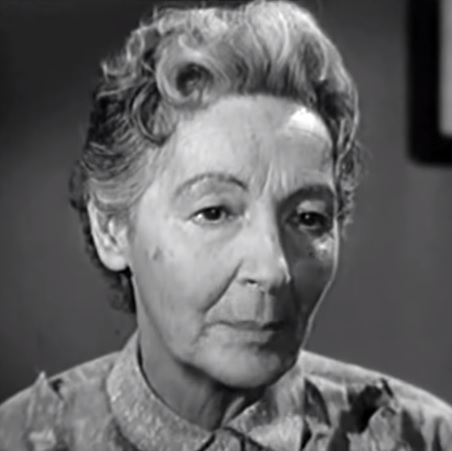
Celia Lovsky plays Spanish aristocrat Señora Sandoval, Consuela's grandmother.

At the swing station, Cowboy learns Nanchez has escaped and is likely after Quito. Setting out on a borrowed horse, Cowboy catches up with the stagecoach and warns Hook. After learning why Nanchez is stalking them, every passenger but Travers supports Cora's decision to keep Quito. While driving at a breakneck pace, the stage hits a rock and overturns, its suspension damaged.

Nanchez appears and offers a deal: The stage and its passengers will be allowed to proceed if they surrender Quito. Hook refuses the deal. They are forced to spend the night in the desert while the coach's driver, Mr. Trude, makes repairs. Cowboy and Consuela spend time together, becoming mutually attracted.

In the morning, Travers offers Cora money to surrender Quito. When Cora remains undeterred, Travers sneaks off to try to bribe Nanchez to spare the group. Nanchez kills him, leaving his money untouched. Surrounded, Hook has Trude restrain Cora and makes Cowboy hold a gun to Quito's head within sight of Nanchez, instructing Cowboy to shoot if Hook signals during his parley. Hook informs Natchez that Quito's life will be forfeit if he attacks. Thwarted, Nanchez orders his band to retreat.

The stagecoach reaches San Miguel, but Fred is not there to meet Cora. Hook rents a buckboard to take them to Fred's ranch. When they arrive, Fred makes it clear that he is willing to take Cora back, but not Quito. Cora decides to leave with Quito. Fred points a rifle at Hook, affirming that Cora belongs to him, but that he and Quito can leave. Cora tells Fred that their marriage is over and asks Hook to take her and Quito back to town.

Nanchez and his band appear and attack. Hook, Cora, Quito, and Fred pile onto the buckboard and run for it. A chase ensues. Hook drives the buckboard, while Fred rides in the back firing at the Apaches. Fred kills Nanchez, but is shot and dies. Seeing Nanchez fall, the Apaches give up the chase. (Tribal custom says that if a chief leading an attack is killed, something is wrong and the attack cannot proceed until a new chief is chosen.) Hook stops to bury Fred before continuing to town.

Returning to San Miguel, Hook tells Cora that he will be retiring in four months, if she will have him. She asks about the wife and family he has referred to, and Hook explains they are a fiction he invented to get matchmaking wives to leave him alone. The newly made family rides off into the sunset.

== Cast ==
- Joel McCrea as First Sergeant Clovis Hook
- Barbara Stanwyck as Cora Sutliff
- Earl Holliman as Jeff Bennett, aka "Cowboy"
- Edward Andrews as Charlie Travers
- John Dehner as Fred Sutliff
- Susan Kohner as Consuela
- Royal Dano as Mr. Trude
- Celia Lovsky as Señora Sandoval
- Stanley Adams as Heathcliff
- Terry Lawrence as Quito
- Rodolfo Acosta as Nanchez (as Rudolfo Acosta)
- Richard Shannon as Trooper Ryan
- Sheb Wooley as Townsman
- Jeanne Bates as Weaver's daughter
- Patrick O'Moore as Col. Adam Weaver
- Cyril Delevanti as Junius
- Rush Williams as Cpl. Stoner
- Alfred Linder
- Paul Newlan as Mr. Wilson
- Dee J. Thompson as Tess (as D. J. Thompson)
- Mary Gregory
- Charles Gray as Soldier

== Production ==
Parts of the film were shot in Kanab Canyon, Three Lakes and the Gap in Utah.

== See also ==
- The Stalking Moon, 1968 movie with a similar storyline.
