= James Anderson (American actor) =

American actor

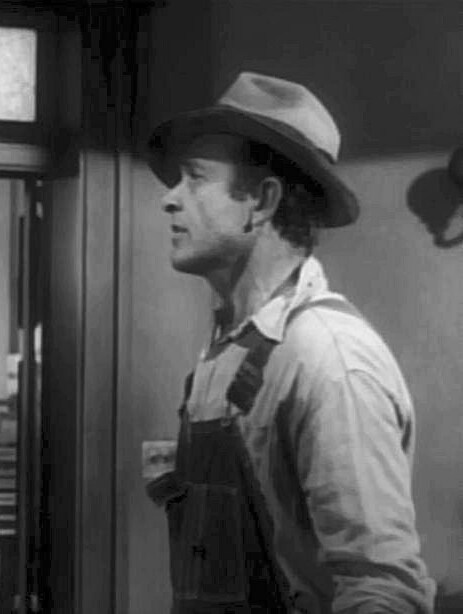
- Anderson in To Kill a Mockingbird (1962)
- Born: July 13, 1920; Birmingham, Alabama, U.S
- Died: September 14, 1969 (aged 49); Billings, Montana, U.S
- Occupation: Actor
- Years active: 1941–1969
- Family: Mary Anderson (sister)

James O. Anderson Jr. (July 13, 1920 – September 14, 1969), sometimes billed as Kyle James and known as Buddy Anderson, was an American television and film actor of the 1950s and 1960s. He is probably best known for his role as Bob E. Lee Ewell in To Kill a Mockingbird (1962).

== Early life ==
Anderson was born to J. O. Anderson and his wife. His sister was Mary Anderson, who also had an acting career.

In 1938, while attending Shades-Cahaba High School, he played halfback on the football team. He later studied acting for a year at the University of Alabama.

== Career ==
After leaving Alabama for Los Angeles, Anderson trained under Max Reinhardt for six months. While there, he starred in the play Zero Hour, written by George Sklar and Albert Maltz. Weeks after starring in the play, in November 1940, Anderson signed a contract with Warner Bros.

He made more than 120 appearances, mostly in television and several films between 1941 and 1969. He made three guest appearances on Perry Mason, including the role of murder victim Frank Anderson in the 1958 episode, "The Case of the Pint-Sized Client," and murder victim Stanley Piper in the 1960 episode, "The Case of the Ill-Fated Faker." He appeared in a number of westerns throughout his career, often playing a gun-for-hire or outlaw...including "Sanctuary at Crystal Springs", the controversial 1963 episode of the ABC/Warner Brothers western series The Dakotas, that led to the series' cancellation, where he played the main antagonist.. He also appeared on Gunsmoke in 1963, playing an outlaw named "Harmon" in S12E7's "The Wrong Man". That same year he guest starred on Alfred Hitchcock Presents in the 1963 episode "Last Seen Wearing Blue Jeans" (S1E28).

== Personal life ==
Anderson was taken to the UCLA Medical Center with a serious injury - a skull fracture - in the summer of 1956. The hospital reported the injury to the police, but newspapers at the time reported that Anderson couldn't be questioned due to the severity of his injury. He was known to be an alcoholic who was "difficult" on the set and sometimes would not show up for work at all. Before he was cast in To Kill a Mockingbird, the film's director, Robert Mulligan, made him promise to stay sober while filming and not to cause any problems on the set. Anderson agreed.

== Death ==
Anderson died suddenly on September 14, 1969 while on location for Little Big Man in Billings, Montana. He was two months past his 49th birthday and was survived by his mother and sister. His cause of death was reported as drug intoxication (barbiturate poisoning).

== Legacy ==
In 2010, Mary Badham, who starred alongside Anderson in To Kill a Mockingbird, praised his method acting style: "[W]hen he walked on the set, he was that character. He gave everybody the willies and we were all intimidated by him".

== Filmography ==
Year	Title	Role	Notes	Ref.
1941	Sergeant York	Eb	Uncredited	
1941	Dive Bomber	Pilot	Uncredited	
1942	Reap the Wild Wind	Callboy In Café	Uncredited	
1945	Mildred Pierce	Diner Customer	Uncredited	
1949	Bride of Vengeance	Guard	Uncredited	
1949	The Great Sinner	Nervous Young Gambler	Uncredited	
1950	Johnny One-Eye	Apartment House Switchboard Operator	Uncredited	
1950	The Fireball	Strong Arm Man	Uncredited	
1950	Hunt the Man Down	Richard Kincaid / William H. Jackson		
1951	Five	Eric		
1951	Along the Great Divide	Dan Roden		
1951	The Blue Veil	Jim Tappan	Uncredited	
1952	The Last Musketeer	Russ Tasker		
1952	Has Anybody Seen My Gal	Chauffeur	Uncredited	
1952	The Duel at Silver Creek	"Rat Face" Blake	As Kyle James	
1952	Hellgate	Vern Brechene	As Kyle James	
1952	The Star	Bailey – Actor playing Jed Garfield in The Fatal Winter	Uncredited	
1952	Ruby Gentry	Jewel Corey		
1953	The Great Jesse James Raid	Johnny Dorette		
1953	Arrowhead	Jerry August		
1953	China Venture	Corporal Walters	Uncredited	
1953	Donovan's Brain	Chief Tuttle		
1953	Flight to Tangier	Dullah		
1954	Riot in Cell Block 11	Guard Acton		
1954	Drums Across the River	Jed Walker		
1954	Pushover	Beery—Mechanic	Uncredited	
1954	Dragnet	Fred Kemp	Uncredited	
1954	Private Hell 36	Patrolman In Locker Room	Uncredited	
1954	The Bamboo Prison	Progressive	Uncredited	
1954	They Rode West	Wounded Trooper	Uncredited	
1954	The Violent Men	Hank Purdue	Uncredited	
1955	Highway Patrol	Gus Montana	Episode: "Phony Insurance"	
1955	Seven Angry Men	Henry Thompson		
1955	An Annapolis Story	Instructor	Uncredited	
1955	The Marauders	Louis Ferber		
1955	At Gunpoint	Barlow	Uncredited	
1956	Inside Detroit	Reller	Uncredited	
1956	Fury at Gunsight Pass	O'Neil		
1956	The Rawhide Years	Deputy Wade		
1956	Tension at Table Rock	Lerner	Uncredited	
1956	Friendly Persuasion	Poor Loser Dunked By Jess	Uncredited	
1956	Running Target	Strothers		
1956	The Rack	"Skinny"	Uncredited	
1957	The Big Land	Bob Cole		
1957	Perry Mason (1957 TV series) (Season 1 Episode 9, "The Case of the Vagabond Vixen")	Peter Handsell		
1958	The Thing That Couldn't Die	Boyd Abercrombie		
1958	As Young as We Are	Barney	Uncredited	
1958	I Married a Monster from Outer Space	Weldon		
1962	Pressure Point	Father	Uncredited	
1962	To Kill a Mockingbird	Robert E. Lee "Bob" Ewell		
1966	The Chase	Simmons	Uncredited	
1969	Take the Money and Run	Chain Gang Warden		
1969	The Ballad of Cable Hogue	Preacher		
1970	Little Big Man	Sergeant	(final film role)	

== Television ==
Year	Title	Role	Notes
1953	Dragnet	Harold Young	S3:66, The Big Trunk"
1953	Dragnet	Daniel Miller	S3:76, "The Hit and Run Killer" as Kyle James
1959	Rawhide	Troxel	S1:E8, "Incident West of Lano"
1960	The Rifleman	Johnny Denver	S2:E23, "The Grasshopper"
1961	Rawhide	Morse	S3:E25, "Incident of the Running Man"
1961	Rawhide	Sheriff	S4:E7, "The Black Sheep"
1963	The Alfred Hitchcock Hour	Vince Cates	Season 1 Episode 28: "Last Seen Wearing Blue Jeans"
1964	Gunsmoke	Hewitt	S10:E4, "The Violators"
1964	Rawhide	Sheriff	S7:E2, "The Enormous Fist"
