= Charles Marquis Warren =

American film director

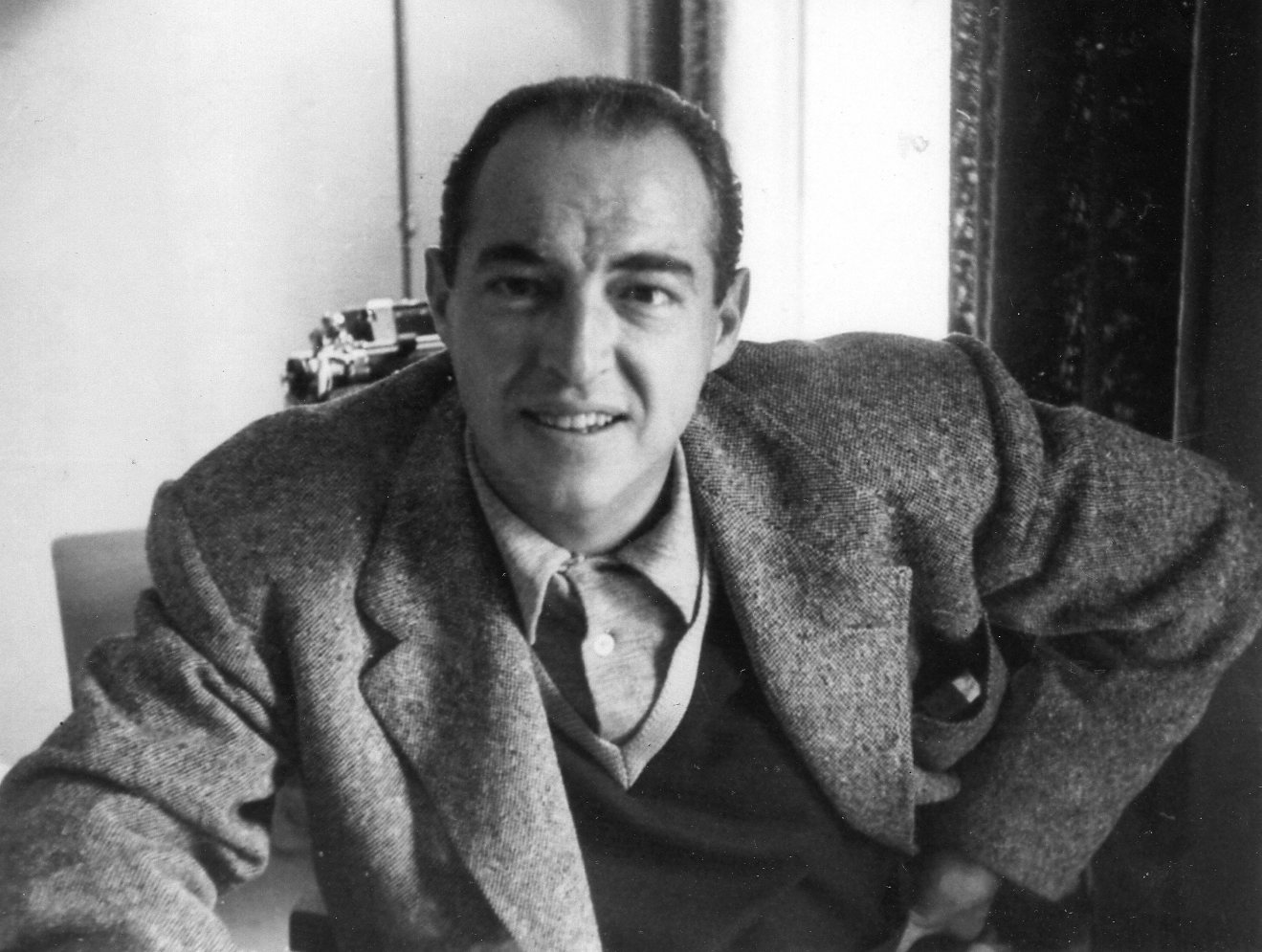
- Charles Marquis Warren, 1955
- Born: December 16, 1912; Baltimore, Maryland, U.S.
- Died: August 11, 1990 (aged 77); West Hills, California, U.S.
- Education: Baltimore City College, Princeton University
- Occupations: Motion picture and television writer, producer, and director
- Years active: 1933–1969
- Spouse: Anna C. Tootle
- Children: 3 daughters

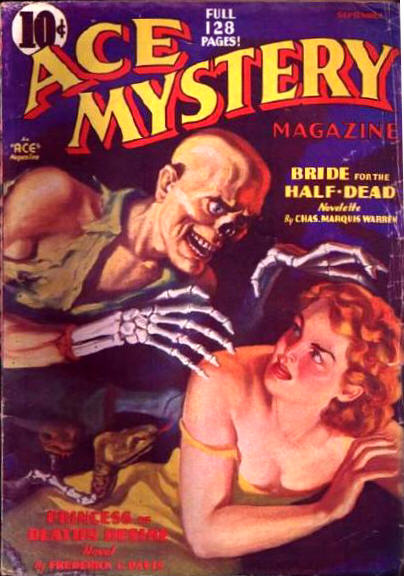
At the beginning of his film career, Warren also wrote stories for pulp magazines like Ace Mystery

Charles Marquis Warren (December 16, 1912 – August 11, 1990) was an American motion picture and television writer, producer, and director who specialized in Westerns. Among his notable career achievements were his involvement in creating the television series Rawhide and his work in adapting the radio series Gunsmoke for television.

== Biography ==
=== Early life ===
Warren was born in Baltimore, Maryland, and was the son of a real estate broker and the godson of famous American writer and fellow Baltimorean F. Scott Fitzgerald.

He was educated at The Baltimore City College, a longtime prominent secondary school in the region plus the third oldest public high school in America (founded 1839). It is known for its landmark stone "Castle on the Hill" of Collegiate Gothic architecture with a tall bell/clock tower, built in 1922-1928. With numerous famous alumni / faculty and curriculum as one of the nation's earliest Magnet schools, the City College focuses on the humanities / liberal arts, social studies and the Classics. Warren graduated in 1930, two years after the construction / opening of its current "Castle on the Hill" but began his City College tenure at its longtime earlier site and buildings from 1875/1899 at North Howard and West Centre Streets (adjacent to the first downtown campus of The Johns Hopkins University). He was inducted into its B.C.C. Hall of Fame and is remembered by a commemorative descriptive wall plaque in Memorial Corridor.

=== Writer ===
During his college years, he developed an interest in writing, resulting in a play entitled No Sun, No Moon, which was staged at Princeton University. Warren decided to go to Hollywood in 1933 when Metro-Goldwyn-Mayer took an option on the play. With the help of his godfather, Warren secured a position as a staff writer for the studio.

His early assignments included working on the scripts for Mutiny on the Bounty (1935) starring Charles Laughton and Clark Gable, and Top Hat (1935) with Fred Astaire and Ginger Rogers. He made the latter film on loan out to RKO Radio Pictures. Warren eventually left Hollywood for New York City where he found success as a fiction writer for various pulp magazines. Several of his writings were published in The Saturday Evening Post. One of his Post stories, Only the Valiant, and the Argosy serial Bugles Are for Soldiers, were published as novels and became best-sellers. Bugles Are for Soldiers book length version was retitled Valley of the Shadow.

In 1941, he married Anna Crawford Tootle. They had three daughters, Anne, Jessica, and Victoria.

=== World War II ===
During World War II, Warren joined the United States Navy and served in the Photo Science Laboratory. He rose to the rank of commander and, while serving in the South Pacific theater in 1944, was wounded by a Japanese grenade. For his wounds and service, he received decorations of a Purple Heart, a Bronze Star and five battle stars. During his recovery at Guadalcanal, his novel Only the Valiant was purchased by Warner Bros. studios.

=== Return to Hollywood ===
Following his discharge, Warren returned to Hollywood and re-established himself as a screenwriter specializing in westerns. He was the screenwriter for Beyond Glory (1948), starring Alan Ladd; Streets of Laredo (1949), with William Holden and Macdonald Carey; Oh! Susanna (1951), with Rod Cameron; The Redhead and the Cowboy (1951), with Glenn Ford and Rhonda Fleming; and Springfield Rifle (1952), with Gary Cooper. Only the Valiant was adapted by other writers for a 1951 film starring Gregory Peck.

=== Director ===
In 1951, Warren began directing films as well as writing them, starting with Little Big Horn, a western starring Lloyd Bridges. He followed this with Hellgate (1952), with James Arness and produced by Commander Films Corporation, a company that Warren founded. In 1953, he moved to Paramount, where he wrote the screenplay for Pony Express, starring Charlton Heston as Buffalo Bill. In the same year, he wrote and directed Arrowhead, starring Heston and Jack Palance, and the 3-D adventure Flight to Tangier, with Palance and Joan Fontaine. Warren also directed Seven Angry Men (1955), an Allied Artists production starring Raymond Massey.

=== Gunsmoke ===
In 1955, CBS offered Warren the position of director and producer of Gunsmoke, a new television series based on the popular radio series of the same name and produced by Norman Macdonnell. Initially interested in only making motion pictures, Warren accepted the offer when CBS agreed to pay him $7000 per week. He produced the entire first season of the series and directed the first 26 of its 39 episodes.

Warren continued as producer for the second season of Gunsmoke but left the series in mid-season due to a difficult professional relationship with Macdonnell.

=== Emirau Productions ===
After leaving Gunsmoke, Warren returned to working in the cinema as a writer, director, and producer.

He established his own production company, Emirau Productions, named after the battle in World War II in which Warren was injured.

His films from this era include the horror films Back From the Dead (1957), with Peggie Castle; The Unknown Terror (1958), with John Howard; and the war film Desert Hell (1958) with Brian Keith. His westerns include Trooper Hook (1957), featuring Joel McCrea and Barbara Stanwyck; Copper Sky (1957), with Jeff Morrow; Ride a Violent Mile (1958), starring John Agar; Blood Arrow (1958), with Scott Brady; and Cattle Empire (1958), starring Joel McCrea.

=== Return to Television ===
Warren also continued working in television. In 1957, he wrote, produced, and directed an episode of the anthology series Playhouse 90 entitled "Without Incident", which starred Errol Flynn.

In 1959, he became producer and occasional writer and director for the series Rawhide starring Eric Fleming and Clint Eastwood.

He also served briefly as producer or executive producer for three other western series, Gunslinger, The Iron Horse with Dale Robertson and The Virginian with James Drury.

He returned to film as the writer of Day of the Evil Gun (1968), featuring Glenn Ford, and as the writer and director of Charro! (1969) starring Elvis Presley.

Warren died of a heart aneurysm in 1990 at the age of 77, and is buried at Arlington National Cemetery.

== Filmography ==
Year	Title	Credited as			
Year	Title	Producer	Director	Screenwriter	Story
1948	Beyond Glory			Yes	
1949	Streets of Laredo			Yes	
1951	Oh! Susanna			Yes	
1951	The Redhead and the Cowboy				Yes
1951	Only the Valiant				Yes
1951	Fighting Coast Guard				Yes
1951	Little Big Horn		Yes	Yes	
1952	Woman of the North Country				Yes
1952	Hellgate		Yes		
1952	Springfield Rifle			Yes	
1953	Pony Express			Yes	
1953	Arrowhead		Yes	Yes	
1953	Flight to Tangier		Yes	Yes	
1955	Seven Angry Men		Yes		
1956	The Black Whip		Yes		
1956	Tension at Table Rock		Yes		
1957	Trooper Hook		Yes		
1957	The Unknown Terror		Yes		
1957	Back from the Dead		Yes		
1957	Copper Sky	Yes	Yes		
1957	Ride a Violent Mile	Yes	Yes		Yes
1958	Blood Arrow	Yes	Yes		
1958	Cattle Empire		Yes	Yes	
1958	Desert Hell	Yes	Yes		
1968	Day of the Evil Gun			Yes	Yes
1969	Charro!	Yes	Yes	Yes	
