= John Pickard (American actor) =

American actor (1913–1993)

John M. Pickard
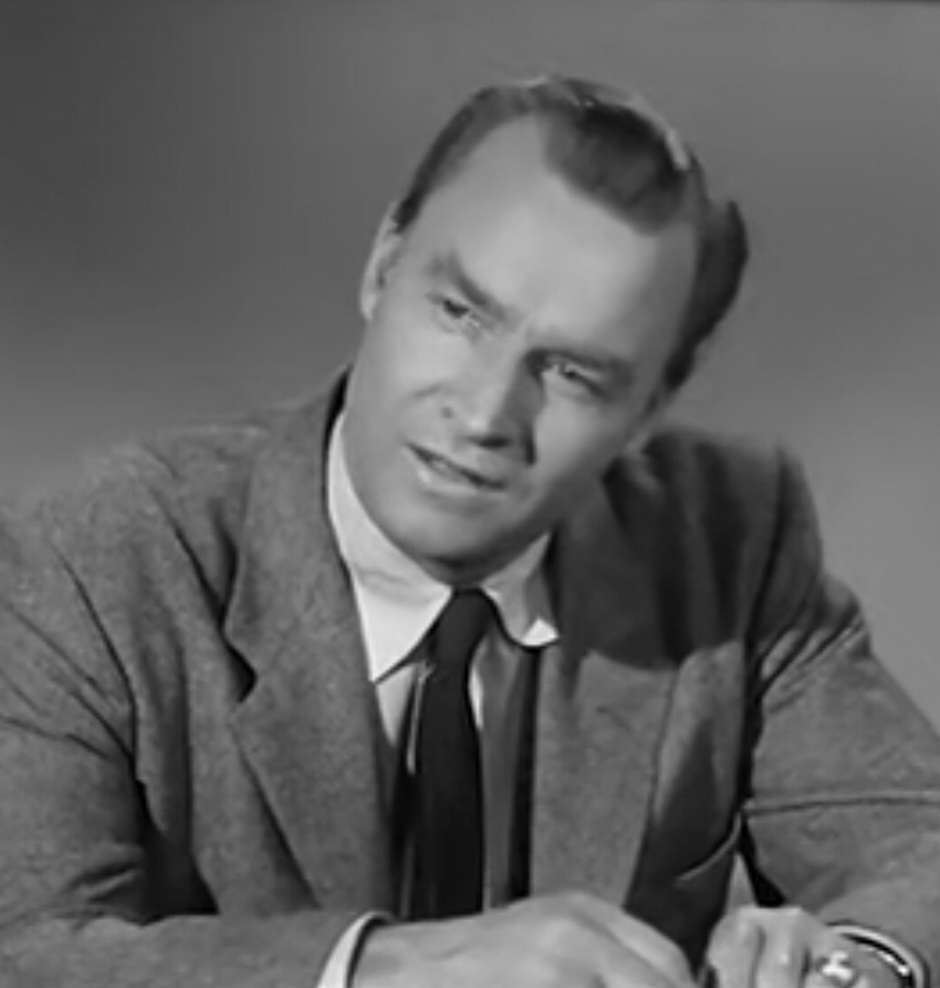
- Pickard in an episode of The Public Defender (1955)
- Born: John M. Pickard Jr. June 25, 1913; Lascassas, Tennessee, U.S.
- Died: August 4, 1993 (aged 80); Rutherford County, Tennessee, U.S.
- Occupation: Actor
- Years active: 1936–1987
- Spouse: Anne McLaurine
- Children: 1

John M. Pickard Jr. (June 25, 1913 – August 4, 1993) was an American actor who appeared primarily in television Westerns.

== Early life ==
John M. Pickard Jr. was born in Lascassas in Rutherford County, near Murfreesboro in Middle Tennessee. His parents were John M. Pickard and Rosaline Rucker Pickard. He graduated from Lascassas High School in 1932 and from the Nashville Conservatory in Nashville, Tennessee. A prize won at a bank helped Pickard to travel to Hollywood, hoping to find work in films. After a year there he went to New York with a friend.

== Career ==
Pickard's work as a model in New York included posing for war bond posters that were distributed across the United States.

His first acting roles were small parts in films, mostly uncredited, beginning in 1936 as a dueling soldier in the picture Mary of Scotland, based on the 16th century queen, Mary of Scotland.

Pickard was a chief petty officer in the Navy during World War II. Following the war he helped with a program in Vancouver, Canada, and then went to Hollywood. He acted on stage at the Pasadena Playhouse and the Geller Playhouse. He returned to acting after the war and appeared in supporting roles in scores of Westerns and action dramas before landing the starring role in the syndicated television series, Boots and Saddles, set in an Arizona fort in the late 19th century. His second film role, also uncredited, came in John Wayne's Wake of the Red Witch (1948), produced by Republic Pictures. Republic co-starred him with Walter Reed in the 12-chapter serial Government Agents vs. Phantom Legion (1951), billed as "John Pickard" without the middle initial.

Pickard's first television guest-starring roles were in crime dramas in 1951 and 1952, respectively -- Racket Squad, with Reed Hadley, and Boston Blackie. In 1954, he guest starred on the legal drama, The Public Defender, again with Reed Hadley. He was also cast on the syndicated Western anthology series, Stories of the Century, with Jim Davis, and later on Davis' other series, Rescue 8, based on stories of the Los Angeles County Fire Department. Pickard appeared on Hopalong Cassidy and in 1956 on the CBS children's Western My Friend Flicka. That same year he was cast in another anthology series, Navy Log, and in an episode of Jack Webb's NBC series, Dragnet. He appeared in a 1956 episode of the TV series The Lone Ranger entitled "Trouble at Tylerville" and in 1957 in the final episode "Outlaws in Grease Paint".

From 1957 to 1958, he filled the lead role of Captain Shank Adams on Boots and Saddles, with episodes set in the Arizona Territory on a United States Army fort. Afterward, Pickard guest starred in many more Westerns including the role of the gunfighter Johnny Ringo on The Life and Legend of Wyatt Earp, starring Hugh O'Brian as Wyatt Earp. Pickard also appeared as Derr in the series Official Detective 1958 episode "The Policeman's Gun".

Other appearances were on Tales of the Texas Rangers, Dick Powell's Zane Grey Theatre, Yancy Derringer, Wagon Train, Johnny Ringo, Tales of Wells Fargo, The Texan, The Rebel, Laramie, The Rifleman, Empire, Rawhide, The Wild Wild West, and The Virginian. From 1960 to 1975, he appeared in twelve episodes of the long-running CBS Western, Gunsmoke, with James Arness, who in 1955 had beaten out Pickard for the series lead as Marshal Matt Dillon.

In 1959, Pickard was cast, uncredited, as a Mississippi River pirate in the episode "The Unwilling" of the NBC Western series, Riverboat, starring Darren McGavin and Burt Reynolds. In the story line, businessman Dan Simpson, played by Eddie Albert, attempts to open a general store in the American West despite a raid from river pirates who stole from him $20,000 in merchandise. Debra Paget is cast in this episode as Lela Russell, and Russell Johnson, as Darius.

In 1961, Pickard had brief recurring role of Sergeant Major Murdock in the short-lived CBS Western Gunslinger, starring Tony Young.

In addition to roles in Westerns, Pickard also guest starred in several dramatic series. He made four appearances on Perry Mason, all as law-enforcement officials, with one episode reuniting him with Walter Reed from their 1951 serial. Other television series included Lassie, The Twilight Zone, Ben Casey, Ironside, Mission: Impossible, and Cannon.

In 1969, he appeared as Frank Ross in another John Wayne film, True Grit. Pickard's final on-screen appearances was in a 1987 episode of the CBS detective series, Simon & Simon.

== Personal life and death ==
Pickard married Anne McLaurine in 1936, and they had a son. On August 4, 1993, Pickard, at the age of 80, was killed by a bull on the family farm in Rutherford County, Tennessee. He was survived by his wife, Ann M. Pickard, and one adult child, three grandchildren and numerous great-grandchildren. His interment was at his family cemetery in Lascassas.

== Selected filmography ==
- Wake of the Red Witch (1948) - Second Diver (uncredited)
- City Across the River (1949) - Detective (uncredited)
- White Heat (1949) - T-Man Driving Car C (uncredited)
- Once More, My Darling (1949) - Inspector (uncredited)
- Fighting Man of the Plains (1949) - Bill - Cattleman (uncredited)
- Twilight in the Sierras (1950) - Henchman (uncredited)
- The Gunfighter (1950) - Eddie's Brother (uncredited)
- Bright Leaf (1950) - Devers (uncredited)
- David Harding, Counterspy (1950) - McCullough (uncredited)
- The Great Jewel Robber (1950) - Joe, Customs Guard (uncredited)
- Frenchie (1950) - Man in Assayer's Office (uncredited)
- California Passage (1950) - Calhoun (uncredited)
- Stage to Tucson (1950) - Sam Granger (uncredited)
- Three Guys Named Mike (1951) - Williams - Crew Schedule Man (uncredited)
- Oh! Susanna (1951) - Rennie
- Katie Did It (1951) - State Trooper (uncredited)
- Lightning Strikes Twice (1951) - Policeman at Accident (uncredited)
- Snake River Desperadoes (1951) - Dodds (uncredited)
- Little Big Horn (1951) - Sgt. Vet McCloud
- Government Agents vs. Phantom Legion (1951) - Sam Bradley
- The Desert Fox: The Story of Rommel (1951) - German Ski Trooper / Staff Aide (uncredited)
- Fixed Bayonets! (1951) - Vic (uncredited)
- The Lady Says No (1951) - Minor Role (uncredited)
- Trail Guide (1952) - Henchman Dawson
- Bugles in the Afternoon (1952) - McDermott (uncredited)
- Hoodlum Empire (1952) - Detective (uncredited)
- The Sniper (1952) - George Tinman (uncredited)
- Red Ball Express (1952) - Major (uncredited)
- Sound Off (1952) - Corporal at Induction Center (uncredited)
- Glory Alley (1952) - Policeman (uncredited)
- Hellgate (1952) - Gundy Boyd
- Battle Zone (1952) - Officer (uncredited)
- Back at the Front (1952) - Processing Announcer (voice, uncredited)
- Operation Secret (1952) - Soldier (uncredited)
- Above and Beyond (1952) - Miller
- The Blazing Forest (1952) - Helicopter Pilot (uncredited)
- The Lawless Breed (1953) - Young Army Lieutenant (uncredited)
- The Bandits of Corsica (1953) - Coachman
- The Story of Three Loves (1953) - Ship's Officer (segment "Equilibrium") (scenes deleted)
- The Charge at Feather River (1953) - Officer (uncredited)
- Arrowhead (1953) - John Gunther
- Mission Over Korea (1953) - Major McGuire (uncredited)
- Fighting Lawman (1953) - Jack Harvey - aka Jack Martin
- Crime Wave (1953) - Information Officer (uncredited)
- Flight to Tangier (1953) - Hank Brady
- Bitter Creek (1954) - Oak Mason - Henchman
- Rose Marie (1954) - Orderly (uncredited)
- Loophole (1954) - Police Detective / Interrogator (uncredited)
- Arrow in the Dust (1954) - Sgt. Lybarger
- Massacre Canyon (1954) - Lt. Ridgeford
- Black Horse Canyon (1954) - Duke
- Return from the Sea (1954) - Spike
- Human Desire (1954) - Matt Henley (uncredited)
- Two Guns and a Badge (1954) - Sharkey - Outlaw
- The Human Jungle (1954) - Examiner (uncredited)
- The Bob Mathias Story (1954) - 1948 Olympics Reporter (uncredited)
- Seven Angry Men (1955) - George Wilson
- Shotgun (1955) - Perez
- Kentucky Rifle (1955) - Reuben Hay
- Seminole Uprising (1955) - Sgt. Chris Zanoba
- Francis in the Navy (1955) - Shore Patrolman (uncredited)
- To Hell and Back (1955) - MP (uncredited)
- The McConnell Story (1955) - 2nd Military Policeman (uncredited)
- I Died a Thousand Times (1955) - Sheriff's Deputy (uncredited)
- At Gunpoint (1955) - Alvin Dennis
- Flame of the Islands (1956) - Henchman Parks (uncredited)
- Inside Detroit (1956) - Blair's U.A.W. Friend (uncredited)
- The Lone Ranger (1956) - Sheriff Sam Kimberley
- Crime Against Joe (1956) - Harry Dorn - Bartender
- The Broken Star (1956) - Van Horn
- The Great Locomotive Chase (1956) - Confederate Lt. Fletcher (uncredited)
- A Strange Adventure (1956) - Thug (uncredited)
- Walk the Proud Land (1956) - Sheriff of Tucson (uncredited)
- Away All Boats (1956) - Maj. Scott (uncredited)
- Tension at Table Rock (1956) - Cord (uncredited)
- Friendly Persuasion (1956) - Ex-Sergeant on Front Line with Josh (uncredited)
- The Black Whip (1956) - Sheriff Persons
- Three Brave Men (1956) - Naval Investigator (uncredited)
- The Night Runner (1957) - Dr. Fisher
- War Drums (1957) - Sheriff Bullard
- Badlands of Montana (1957) - Vince Branton
- The Oklahoman (1957) - Marshal Bill
- Outlaw's Son (1957) - Ed Wyatt
- Copper Sky (1957) - Trooper Hadley
- Ride a Violent Mile (1957) - Marshal James Thorne
- The Power of the Resurrection (1958) - Roman Captain (uncredited)
- The FBI Story (1959) - Klansman (uncredited)
- The Rookie (1959) - Military Policeman (uncredited)
- Cimarron (1960) - Ned - Cavalry Captain (uncredited)
- Gunsmoke (1960) - Jack Purdy
- Gun Street (1961) - Dr. Knudson
- Dangerous Charter (1962) - Police Detective (shot in 1958)
- A Gathering of Eagles (1963) - Controller (uncredited)
- The Greatest Story Ever Told (1965) - Peter's Accuser #2 (uncredited)
- Country Boy (1966) - Claude Springer
- Ride to Hangman's Tree (1967) - Pete
- Panic in the City (1968) - Williams
- Charro! (1969) - Jerome Selby
- True Grit (1969) - Frank Ross
- Chisum (1970) - Sgt. Braddock
- Rape Squad (1974) - Dr. Schetman
- The Hindenburg (1975) - Sauter (uncredited)

== Television ==
Year	Title	Role	Notes
1959	Rawhide	Clint Crowley	S1:E10, "Incident of the Golden Calf"
1960	Rawhide	Father Owens	S2:E15, "Incident of the Devil and His Due"
1960	Rawhide	Mattson	S3:E1, "Incident at Rojo Canyon"
1960	Wanted Dead or Alive	Carl Langley	Season 3 Episode 1: "The Trial"
1961	Rawhide	Sheriff	S4:E1, "Rio Salado"
1962	Rawhide	Sheriff	S4:E29, "The Devil and the Deep Blue"
1963	The Alfred Hitchcock Hour	1st Fireman	Season 1 Episode 19: "To Catch a Butterfly"
1963	Rawhide	Sheriff	S5:E31, "Abilene"
1963	Rawhide	Sheriff	S6:E6, "Incident at Farragut Pass"
1963	The Twilight Zone	Police Officer	Season 5 Episode 12: "Ninety Years Without Slumbering"
1964	Rawhide	Sheriff	S6:E24, "Incident of the Odyssey"
1964	Rawhide	Marshal Morgan	S7:E1, "The Race"
1965	Rawhide	Sam Parks	S7:E15, "Josh"
1965	Rawhide	Sheriff	S7:E24, "The Empty Sleeve"
