= Desert Hell =

1958 film by Charles Marquis Warren

- Theatrical release poster
- Directed by: Charles Marquis Warren
- Screenplay by: Charles Marquis Warren; Endre Bohem
- Produced by: Robert Stabler
- Starring: Brian Keith; Barbara Hale; Richard Denning; Johnny Desmond; Phillip Pine; Richard Shannon; Albert Carrier
- Cinematography: John M. Nickolaus, Jr.
- Edited by: Albrecht Joseph
- Music by: Raoul Kraushaar
- Production company: Regal Films
- Distributed by: 20th Century Fox
- Release date: June 25, 1958
- Running time: 82 minutes
- Country: United States
- Language: English

Desert Hell is a 1958 American adventure film directed by Charles Marquis Warren and written by Charles Marquis Warren and Endre Bohem. The film stars Brian Keith, Barbara Hale, Richard Denning, Johnny Desmond, Phillip Pine, Richard Shannon and Albert Carrier. The film was released on June 25, 1958, by 20th Century Fox.

== Plot ==
After an ambush by an Arab tribe, two surviving French Legionnaires return to their fort. One of them, Capt. Edwards, is assigned a new patrol and a mission to alert another fort that an attack may be imminent. The other, Sgt. Major Benet, remains behind. Edwards' situation is further complicated when he catches his wife, Celie, in the arms of a lieutenant, Forbes.

Forbes catches up to the patrol to inform Edwards that the mission has been called off. Edwards disobeys orders and rides on, Forbes joining him in what he calls a suicide mission. A pair of privates, Bergstrom and Hoffstetter, desert the patrol. They are ambushed and Bergstrom is killed. A scout, Kufra, is captured and tortured as well.

In another attack, five Legionnaires are killed and Edwards is mortally wounded. He places Forbes in command. Almost making it back safely, Forbes, too, is seriously wounded and expires as Sgt. Major Benet drags him back to the fort.

== Cast ==
- Brian Keith as Capt. Robert Edwards
- Barbara Hale as Celie Edwards
- Richard Denning as Sgt. Major Pierre Benet
- Johnny Desmond as Lt. Richard Forbes
- Phillip Pine as Cpl. Carlo Parini
- Richard Shannon as Pvt. Hoffstetter
- Albert Carrier as Sgt. St. Clair
- Duane Grey as Pvt. Aruazza
- Charles H. Gray as Pvt. Bandurski
- Richard Gilden as Pvt. Kabussyan
- Ron Foster as Pvt. Bergstrom
- John Verros as Pvt. Kufra, scout
- Michael Pate as Ahitagel
- Patrick O'Moore as Pvt. Corbo
- Felix Locher as Marsaya
- William Hamel as Pvt. Brocklin
- Bhogwan Singh as Holy Marabout
- Robert Etienne as Pvt. Sirmay

== Production ==
Filming started November 1957.
