= Cattle Empire =

1958 film

- Theatrical release poster
- Directed by: Charles Marquis Warren
- Written by: Daniel B. Ullman; Endre Bohem; Eric Norden; Charles Marquis Warren
- Produced by: Robert Stabler II
- Starring: Joel McCrea; Gloria Talbott
- Cinematography: Brydon Baker
- Edited by: Fred W. Berger
- Music by: Paul Sawtell; Bert Shefter
- Color process: DeLuxe Color
- Production company: Emirau Productions
- Distributed by: 20th Century-Fox
- Release date: February 1958
- Running time: 83 minutes
- Country: United States
- Language: English

Cattle Empire is a 1958 American Western film directed by Charles Marquis Warren, starring Joel McCrea. The film was shot in DeLuxe Color and CinemaScope. The film also features Gloria Talbott, Don Haggerty, Phyllis Coates, and Bing Russell and serves as something of a forerunner for director Warren's subsequent television series Rawhide starring Eric Fleming and Clint Eastwood, which used the picture's writer Endre Bohem, as well as some of its supporting cast (Paul Brinegar, Steve Raines, Rocky Shahan, and Charles H. Gray).

The film is produced by Emirau Productions and released by 20th Century Fox in February 1958.

== Plot ==
John Cord has been roped and is being dragged through the streets with the intent to kill him. Cord is despised for a range of things done to the town after the cattle crew he was responsible went on a wild drunken rampage.

Cord is saved from death by Ralph, a prominent cattle owner and major businessman of the town, who turns up with his wife and his brother. Ralph is blind, and Cord is shown to be responsible for that, as well. Ralph reveals that he invited Cord to the town. As the most experienced cattleman in the area, Cord is the only one who can drive Ralph's and the townspeople's cattle to Fort Clemson where they can be sold. The town is on the verge of economic collapse, and the sale of the cattle will save the town.

Cord is a skilled cattleman and one of the few people capable of driving the cattle across land, at a time of the year when little grass is available and many of the rivers are dry. He initially refuses the offer from Ralph. He later meets the rival of Ralph, Garth, who wants to drive his own cattle to Fort Clemson. Cord accepts an offer from Garth to drive the cattle. Then goes back to accept the offer from Ralph as well. While committing to get Garth's cattle to Fort Clemson first, he secretly plots his revenge against the townsfolk. He departs town on the cattle drive with Ralph, his wife, many of the townsfolk who tried to kill him, and a young girl who is in love with him. Things occur on the cattle drive, though, which lead Cord to reconsider his revenge on the townsfolk of Hamilton.

== Cast ==
- Joel McCrea as John Cord
- Gloria Talbott as Sandy Jeffrey
- Don Haggerty as Ralph Hamilton
- Phyllis Coates as Janice Hamilton
- Bing Russell as Douglas Hamilton
- Richard Shannon as Garth
- Paul Brinegar as Tom Jefferson Jeffrey
- Charles H. Gray as Tom Powis (billed as Charles Gray)
- Hal K. Dawson as George Washington Jeffrey
- Patrick O'Moore as Rex Cogswell
- Duane Grey as Juan Aruzza
- William McGraw as Jim Whittaker (billed as Bill McGraw)
- Jack Lomas as Sheriff Brewster
- Nesdon Booth as Barkeep
