= The Ride to Hangman's Tree =

1967 film by Alan Rafkin

- Theatrical release poster
- Directed by: Alan Rafkin
- Screenplay by: Luci Ward; Jack Natteford; William Bowers
- Story by: Luci Ward; Jack Natteford
- Produced by: Howard Christie
- Starring: Jack Lord; Melodie Johnson; James Farentino; Don Galloway; Richard Anderson; Ed Peck
- Cinematography: Gene Polito
- Edited by: Gene Palmer
- Music by: Frank Skinner
- Production company: Universal Pictures
- Distributed by: Universal Pictures
- Release date: May 1967
- Running time: 90 minutes
- Country: United States
- Language: English

The Ride to Hangman's Tree is a 1967 American Western film directed by Alan Rafkin and written by Luci Ward, Jack Natteford and William Bowers. The film stars Jack Lord, Melodie Johnson, James Farentino, Don Galloway, Richard Anderson and Ed Peck. The film was released in May 1967, by Universal Pictures.

== Cast ==
- Jack Lord as Guy Russell
- Melodie Johnson as Lillie Malone
- James Farentino as Matt Stone
- Don Galloway as Nevada Jones
- Richard Anderson as Steven Carlson
- Ed Peck as Sheriff Stewart
- Robert Yuro as Jeff Scott
- Robert Cornthwaite as T.L. Harper
- Paul Reed as Corbett
- Fabian Dean as Indian
- John Pickard as Pete
- Claudia Bryar as Mrs. Harmon
- Robert Sorrells as Blake

== Production ==
Parts of the film were shot at Cedar Breaks, Strawberry Valley, and Strawberry Point in Utah.
