= Celia Lovsky =

Austrian-American actress

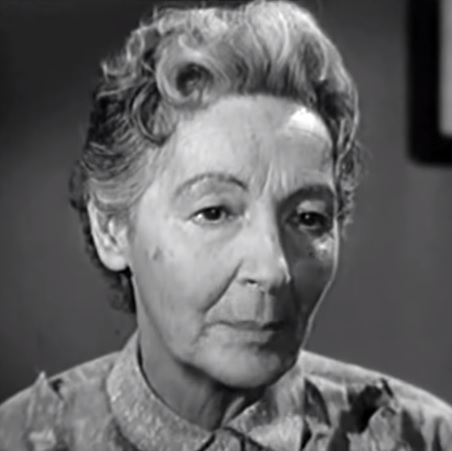
- Lovsky in the TV series One Step Beyond, episode Message from Clara, 1959
- Born: Cäcilia Josefina Lvovský; February 21, 1897; Vienna, Austria-Hungary
- Died: October 12, 1979 (aged 82); Los Angeles, California, U.S.
- Occupation: Actress
- Years active: 1930–1974
- Spouses: Heinrich Vinzenz Nowak (m. 1919; div. 1929) Peter Lorre (m. 1934; div. 1945)

Celia Lovsky (born Cäcilia Josefina Lvovský, February 21, 1897 – October 12, 1979) was an Austrian-American actress. In the original Star Trek she played the Vulcan matriarch T'Pau, and in The Twilight Zone she played the aged daughter of an eternally youthful Hollywood actress.

== Early years ==
Lovsky was born in Vienna, daughter of Břetislav Lvovský, a minor Czech opera composer, and his wife Vallee, a cellist. She studied theater, dance, and languages at the Austrian Royal Academy of Arts and Music, where she "was educated specifically for the stage".

== Career ==
Lovsky moved to Berlin, where she acted in the surrealist plays Dream Theater and Dream Play by Karl Kraus. She was in a production of William Shakespeare's Othello near Vienna. Lovsky was instrumental in bringing Peter Lorre to the attention of Fritz Lang, leading eventually to Lorre's appearance in the film M (1931) directed by Lang.

After her divorce, Lovsky started taking roles in American movies and television. She made a name for herself playing roles including the deaf-mute mother of Lon Chaney in Man of a Thousand Faces (1957) with James Cagney and as Apache Princess Saba in the 1955 film Foxfire starring Jane Russell and Jeff Chandler.

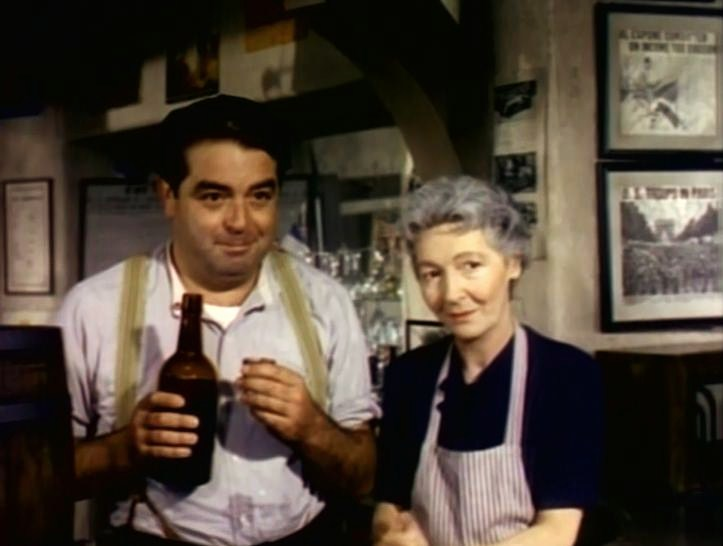
Kurt Kasznar and Lovsky in The Last Time I Saw Paris (1954)

As she grew older, she was given dowager roles, such as a Spanish matriarch in an episode of Bonanza titled "The Spanish Grant" (1960) and Have Gun Will Travel titled "The Man Who Wouldn't Talk" (1958) (with Charles Bronson), Romany matriarchs, elderly Native American women such as in the Wagon Train episode "A Man Called Horse", expatriate Russian princesses, and a role as the widowed mother of Reinhard Schwimmer, one of the victims in the film The St. Valentine's Day Massacre (1967). Her final movie appearance was of the "Exchange Leader" in Soylent Green (1973). She delivers the final confirmation to Edward G. Robinson's character Sol about Soylent Green's true ingredient.

One of her television appearances was in the Twilight Zone episode "Queen of the Nile" (1964), in which she played the elderly daughter of a never-aging actress (played by Ann Blyth); another was as the Vulcan matriarch T'Pau who presides at Mr. Spock's wedding in the Star Trek episode "Amok Time" (1967).

== Personal life and death ==
Lovsky married journalist Heinrich Vinzenz Nowak in 1919. By 1925, they were apparently estranged and she was romantically involved with playwright Arthur Schnitzler. She met and married Peter Lorre in 1934 in London and divorced in 1940 or in 1944. After the couple settled in Santa Monica, California, Lorre did not wish Lovsky to work, believing he should be the breadwinner and she should remain at home.

On October 12, 1979, Lovsky died at her home in Los Angeles, aged 82.

== Partial filmography ==
- 1930 Twice Married as Fraulein Koch
- 1930 The Jumping Jack as Unknown
- 1947 The Foxes of Harrow as Minna Ludenbach (uncredited)
- 1948 Letter from an Unknown Woman as Flower Vendor (uncredited)
- 1948 Sealed Verdict as Emma Steigmann
- 1948 The Snake Pit as Inmate Gertrude (uncredited)
- 1949 Flaming Fury as Bertha Polacheck
- 1949 Chicago Deadline as Mrs. Schleffler (uncredited)
- 1950 Captain Carey, U.S.A. as Countess Francesca de Cresci
- 1950 Bright Leaf as Dressmaker (uncredited)
- 1950 The Killer That Stalked New York as Mrs. Kowalski (uncredited)
- 1951 The Scarf as Mrs. Barrington (uncredited)
- 1951 Night Into Morning as Mrs. Niemoller
- 1951 The People Against O'Hara as Mrs. Korvac (uncredited)
- 1952 Because You're Mine as Mrs. Rossano
- 1953 The Story of Three Loves as The Governess On Ship (segment "The Jealous Lover / Mademoiselle") (uncredited)
- 1953 The Blue Gardenia as Mae, The Flower Woman (uncredited)
- 1953 Champ for a Day as Gladys Macrowitz (uncredited)
- 1953 The Big Heat as Lagana's Mother In Portrait (uncredited)
- 1954 Rhapsody as Frau Sigerlist
- 1954 Make Haste to Live as Mother
- 1954 Three Coins in the Fountain as Baroness (uncredited)
- 1954 The Last Time I Saw Paris as Mama
- 1955 New York Confidential as Mama Lupo
- 1955 Foxfire as Princess Saba
- 1955 Duel on the Mississippi as Celeste Tulane
- 1955 Texas Lady as Mrs. Gantz (uncredited)
- 1956 While the City Sleeps as Miss Dodd
- 1956 The Opposite Sex as Lutsi (uncredited)
- 1956 Death of a Scoundrel as Mrs. Sabourin, Clementi's Mother
- 1956 Rumble on the Docks as Anna Smigelski
- 1957 The Garment Jungle as Tulio's Mother
- 1957 Trooper Hook as Señora Sandoval
- 1957 Man of a Thousand Faces as Mrs. Chaney
- 1958 Crash Landing as Mrs. Ortega
- 1958 Twilight for the Gods as Ida Morris
- 1958 Have Gun Will Travel ("The Man Who Wouldn't Talk") as Aunt Anna
- 1958-1960 Playhouse 90 as First Woman / Madam Guibert / Elsa Lindnow / Mrs. Schwimmer
- 1959 I Mobster as Mme. Arle
- 1959 Alfred Hitchcock Presents (Season 4 Episode 25: "The Kind Waitress") as Sara Mannerheim
- 1959 The Gene Krupa Story as Mother
- 1962 Hitler as Frau Angelika Raubal
- 1962 The Alfred Hitchcock Hour (Season 1 Episode 9: "The Black Curtain") as Mrs. Fisher, Apartment Complex Manager
- 1963 The Alfred Hitchcock Hour (Season 1 Episode 22: "Diagnosis: Danger") as Mrs. Dominic Chitava
- 1963 The New Phil Silvers Show ("Little Old Gluemaker, Me") as Frieda
- 1964 The Twilight Zone ("Queen of the Nile") as Viola Draper
- 1965 36 Hours as Elsa
- 1965 The Greatest Story Ever Told as Woman Behind Railings (uncredited)
- 1965 Harlow as Maria Ouspenskaya
- 1966 The Big Valley ("Hide the Children") as Gypsy Grandmother
- 1966 The Doomsday Flight (continuing her Rod Serling connection) as Passenger
- 1967 The St. Valentine's Day Massacre as Josephine Schwimmer
- 1967 The Flying Nun ("Wailing in a Winter Wonderland") as Sister Olaf
- 1967 Star Trek (Season 2 Episode 1: "Amok Time") as T'Pau
- 1968 The Power as Mrs. Hallson
- 1970 Airport as Mrs. Williams, Passenger (uncredited)
- 1973 Soylent Green as The Exchange Leader
