= Copper Sky =

1957 film by Charles Marquis Warren

- Theatrical release poster
- Directed by: Charles Marquis Warren
- Screenplay by: Eric Norden
- Story by: Robert Stabler
- Produced by: Robert Stabler
- Starring: Jeff Morrow; Coleen Gray; Strother Martin; Paul Brinegar; John Pickard; Patrick O'Moore
- Cinematography: Brydon Baker
- Edited by: Michael Luciano
- Music by: Raoul Kraushaar
- Production companies: Regal Films; Emirau Productions
- Distributed by: 20th Century Fox
- Release date: September 1957
- Running time: 77 minutes
- Country: United States
- Language: English

Copper Sky is a 1957 American Western film directed by Charles Marquis Warren and written by Eric Norden. The film stars Jeff Morrow, Coleen Gray, Strother Martin, Paul Brinegar, John Pickard and Patrick O'Moore. The film was released in September 1957, by 20th Century Fox.

== Cast ==
- Jeff Morrow as Haxon 'Hack' Williams
- Coleen Gray as Nora Hayes
- Strother Martin as Pokey
- Paul Brinegar as Charlie Martin
- John Pickard as Trooper Hadley
- Patrick O'Moore as Colonel Thurston
- Jack Lomas as Lawson
- William Hamel as Trumble
- Dorothy Schuyler as Townswoman

== Production ==
It was known as The Far West.

Parts of the film were shot in Johnson Canyon and Kanab Canyon in Utah.
