= Only the Valiant =

1951 film by Gordon Douglas

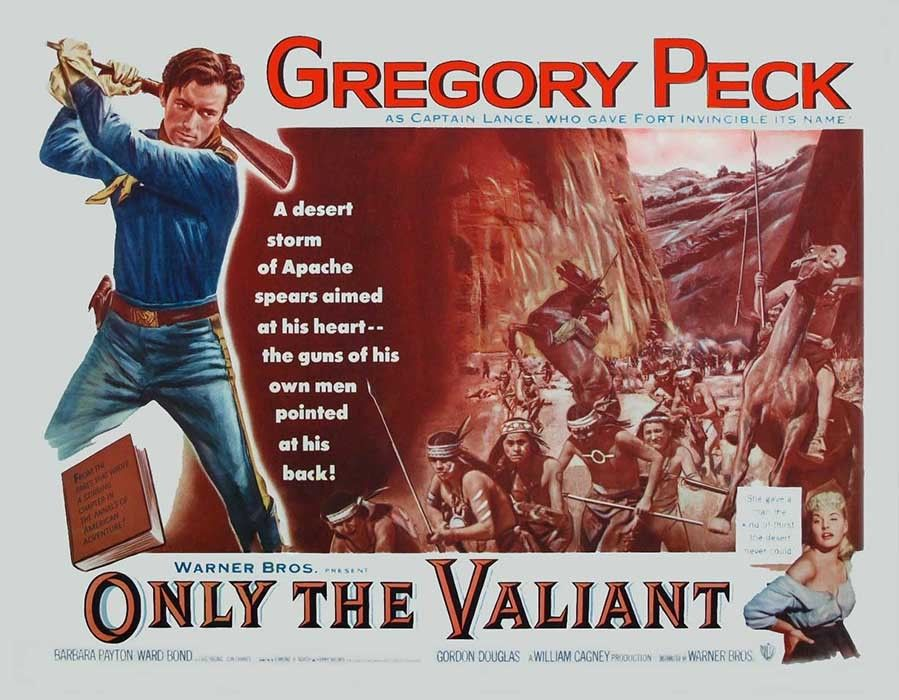
- Lobby Card
- Directed by: Gordon Douglas
- Written by: Charles Marquis Warren (novel)
- Screenplay by: Edmund H. North; Harry Brown
- Produced by: William Cagney
- Starring: Gregory Peck; Barbara Payton; Ward Bond
- Cinematography: Lionel Lindon
- Edited by: Walter Hannemann; Robert S. Seiter
- Music by: Franz Waxman
- Color process: Black and white
- Production company: William Cagney Productions
- Distributed by: Warner Bros. Pictures
- Release date: April 13, 1951 (New York)
- Running time: 105 minutes
- Country: United States
- Language: English
- Budget: $1,499,000
- Box office: $3,085,000 $2 million (US rentals)

Only the Valiant, also known as Fort Invincible, is a 1951 American Western film produced by William Cagney, directed by Gordon Douglas and starring Gregory Peck, Barbara Payton and Ward Bond. The screenplay was written by Edmund H. North and Harry Brown based on the 1943 novel of the same title by Charles Marquis Warren.

Peck considered the role a low point of his career.

== Plot ==
Following the American Civil War, peace is maintained in the New Mexico Territory by Fort Invincible, a fortification set up outside a mountain pass that blocks marauding bands of Apache Indians. The Apache are able to eventually take the fort by cutting off its water supply, then assaulting the fort when its garrison is at its weakest and killing all of the defenders.

Captain Richard Lance arrives with a patrol soon after the battle and captures Tucsos, the charismatic leader of the Apache. Lance's scout advises the captain to kill Tucsos, but Lance will not shoot a prisoner.

At the headquarters of the 5th Cavalry, the commanding officer orders Lance to assign an officer to command an escort to take Tucsos to a larger post. Lance opts to lead the patrol himself, but the colonel keeps him at the fort to defend against Apache attacks and orders him to a more popular officer, Lt. Holloway, to lead the small group escorting Tucsos. Holloway is killed and the Apache free Tucsos. The men at the fort blame Captain Lance, unaware of the colonel's order. They believe that he assigned Holloway to the dangerous mission because he and Holloway were competing for the affection of Cathy Eversham, an officer's daughter. Cathy shares this belief and bitterly ends her relationship with Lance.

Lance's standing with the soldiers at the fort worsens when he assembles a group of misfit cavalrymen to repel the rampaging Indians at the ruins of Fort Invincible, which is considered a suicide mission.

== Cast ==
- Gregory Peck as Captain Richard Lance
- Barbara Payton as Cathy Eversham
- Ward Bond as Corporal Timothy Gilchrist
- Gig Young as 1st Lieutenant William Holloway
- Dan Riss as 1st Lieutenant Jerry Winters
- Clark Howat as Lieutenant Underwood
- Neville Brand as First Sergeant Ben Murdock
- Herbert Heyes as Colonel Drumm
- Art Baker as Captain Jennings
- Hugh Sanders as Captain Eversham
- Lon Chaney Jr. as Trooper Kebussyan
- Warner Anderson as Trooper Rutledge
- Steve Brodie as Trooper Onstot
- Terry Kilburn as Trooper Saxton
- Jeff Corey as Joe Harmony
- Michael Ansara as Tucsos
- Nana Bryant as Mrs. Drumm

== Production ==
William and James Cagney acquired the rights to Charles Marquis Warren's novel Only the Valiant in 1944.

In 1950, David O. Selznick, struggling financially, loaned Gregory Peck to Warner Bros. for $150,000. Peck's costar Barbara Payton was paid $10,000 per week for her leading role. The film was shot on location in New Mexico, and Peck and Payton had a brief affair on set.

== Reception ==
In a contemporary review for The New York Times, critic Thomas M. Pryor wrote: "As action pictures go, this one has its exciting stretches for the conflict is not limited to Indians and soldiers. ... Thanks to Gregory Peck's physical authority and his ability as an actor to imbue a synthetic character with a degree of conviction that would be lost to a lesser performer, the spectator is not, at least, overwhelmed by the banality of the plot. Gordon Douglas' direction is helpful, too, in creating and sustaining an atmosphere of threatening danger."

According to Warner Bros. accounts, the film earned $1,796,000 domestically and $1,630,000 foreign.

== See also ==
- List of Western films 1950–54
