= Nat Holt =

American film producer

Nat Holt (1893–1971) was an American film producer, best known for making Westerns.

He was under contract to RKO in the 1940s then produced a variety of Westerns that were released by other studios. In the late 1950s he moved to television producing such series as Tales of Wells Fargo, Shotgun Slade and The Tall Man.

== Select filmography ==
- Badman's Territory (1946)
- Riffraff (1947)
- Cattle King (1963)
