= Indian Uprising =

Indian Uprising may refer to:

- Indian massacre of 1622, in the English Colony of Virginia
- Indian Rebellion of 1857, an uprising in India against the rule of the British East India Company
- Indian Uprising (film), a 1952 Western film
