= Bulldog Drummond Strikes Back =

Bulldog Drummond Strikes Back may refer to:

- Bulldog Drummond Strikes Back (1934 film), a 1934 American comedy-mystery-adventure film
- Bulldog Drummond Strikes Back (1947 film), a 1947 American thriller film
