= Terry Kilburn =

British-American actor (born 1926)

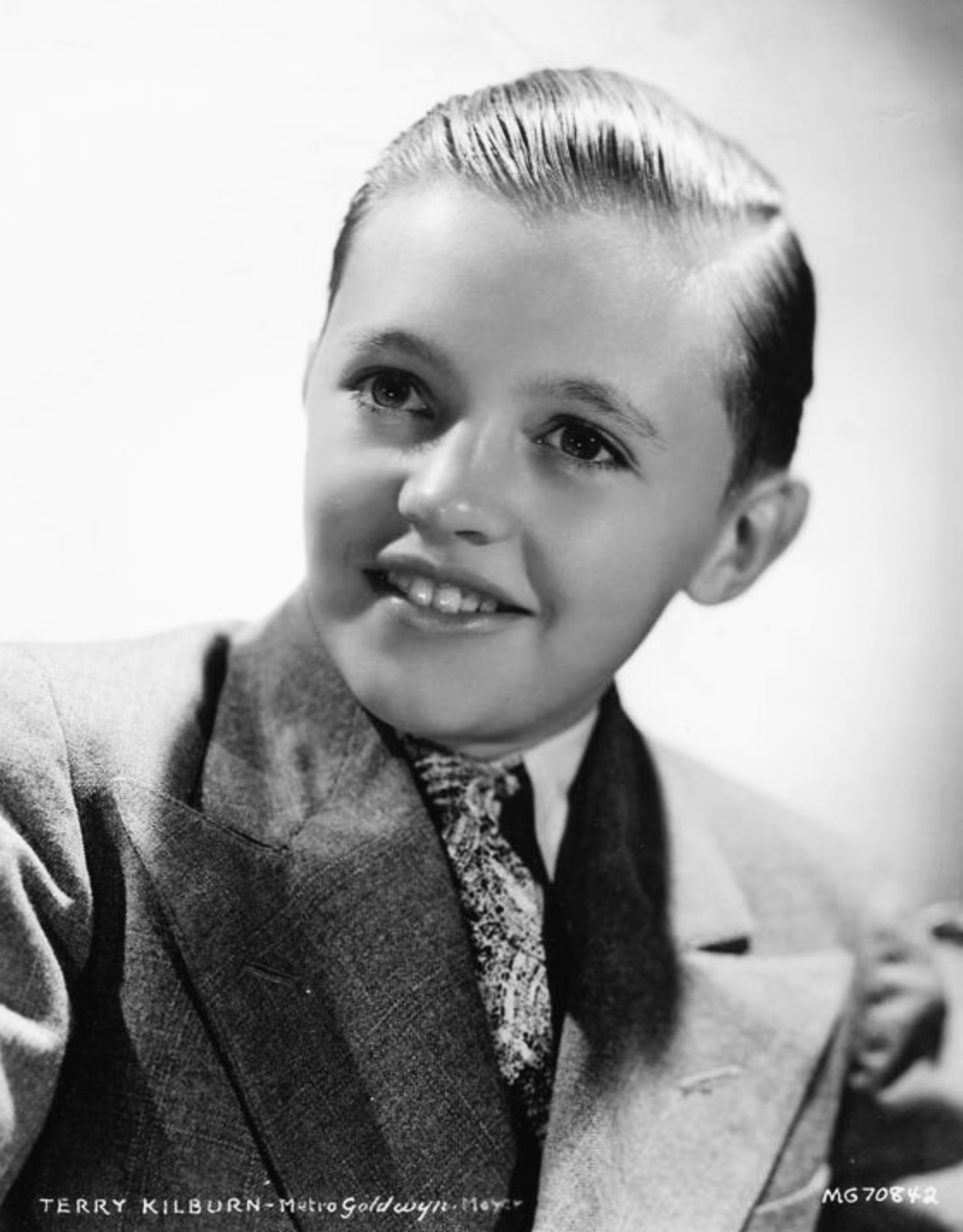
- Kilburn in 1939
- Born: Terence Edward Kilburn; November 25, 1926 (age 99); West Ham, Essex, England
- Citizenship: United Kingdom; United States
- Education: UCLA
- Occupation: Actor
- Years active: 1934–1969
- Partner(s): Charles Nolte (1957–2010, his death)

Terence Edward Kilburn (born November 25, 1926), known for his acting work prior to 1953 as Terry Kilburn, is an English-American actor. Born in London, he moved to Hollywood in the U.S. at the age of 10, and is best known for his roles as a child actor during the Golden Age of Hollywood, in films such as A Christmas Carol (1938) and Goodbye, Mr. Chips (1939) in the late 1930s and the early 1940s.

== Early life ==
Kilburn was born in 1926 in West Ham, Essex, to working-class parents Tom and Alice Kilburn.

Kilburn did some unpaid acting as a young child, and an agent encouraged him to go to Hollywood. He and his mother immigrated to the U.S. in 1937, and his father arrived the following year. A talent scout for MGM discovered him rehearsing for Eddie Cantor's radio show, and he was cast in the British-set film Lord Jeff (1938).

== Career ==
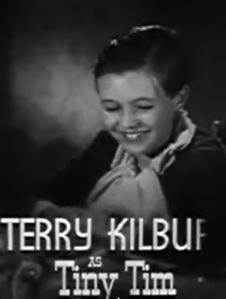
Kilburn as Tiny Tim in A Christmas Carol (1938)

=== Hollywood and Broadway ===
Known for his innocent, dreamy, doe-eyed look, Kilburn achieved fame at the age of 12 portraying Tiny Tim in the 1938 Metro-Goldwyn-Mayer film version of A Christmas Carol, and also as four generations of the Colley family in Goodbye, Mr. Chips (1939).

As a child actor, Kilburn also played leading roles in two films which starred Freddie Bartholomew: Lord Jeff (1938) and Swiss Family Robinson (1940). He was featured in The Adventures of Sherlock Holmes (1939) with Basil Rathbone. In addition to Lord Jeff (1938), he worked alongside Mickey Rooney in Andy Hardy Gets Spring Fever (1939), A Yank at Eton (1942), and National Velvet (1944).

In 1946 Kilburn was Joe, the horse's groom, in Black Beauty. In his early 20s, in 1947 and 1948, he was in four back-to-back Bulldog Drummond films, as Seymour, a reporter; and in 1950 he had small roles in two seagoing films.

After high school, Kilburn concentrated on stage work, and studied drama at UCLA. He made his Broadway debut, credited as Terrance Kilburn, portraying Eugene Marchbanks in a 1952 revival of George Bernard Shaw's Candida. He thereafter remained committed to live performances, as both actor and director.

After 1952, Kilburn was credited on screen as Terence Kilburn. His final feature film role was a small part in Lolita (1962). Between 1951 and 1969, he was also in nearly a dozen teleplays, television movies, and television series episodes.

=== After Hollywood ===
From 1970 to 1994, Kilburn was artistic director of Oakland University's Meadow Brook Theatre in Rochester, Michigan. Meadow Brook Theatre is the largest non-profit professional theater in Michigan and presents classic plays, comedies, and musicals. The theater is known for its annual production of Dickens' A Christmas Carol, adapted by Kilburn's partner, Charles Nolte.

== Personal life ==
Since 1994 Kilburn has resided in Minneapolis, Minnesota. His partner of over 50 years, actor Charles Nolte, died in January 2010.

== Filmography ==
Year	Title	Role	Notes
1934	No Greater Glory	Paul Street Boy	Film debut
1938	Lord Jeff	Albert Baker	
1938	A Christmas Carol	Tiny Tim	
1938	Sweethearts	Brother	
1939	The Great Man Votes	Student	
1939	Goodbye, Mr. Chips	John Colley; Peter Colley I, II, and III	
1939	Andy Hardy Gets Spring Fever	'Stickin' Plaster	
1939	They Shall Have Music	Limey	
1939	The Adventures of Sherlock Holmes	Billy	
1940	Swiss Family Robinson	Ernest Robinson	
1941	Mercy Island	Wiccy	
1942	A Yank at Eton	Hilspeth	Uncredited
1944	National Velvet	Ted	
1946	Black Beauty	Joe	
1947	Song of Scheherazade	Midshipman Lorin	
1947	Bulldog Drummond at Bay	Seymour	
1947	Bulldog Drummond Strikes Back	Seymour	
1948	The Challenge	Seymour	
1948	13 Lead Soldiers	Seymour	
1950	Tyrant of the Sea	Dick Savage	
1950	Fortunes of Captain Blood	Kenny Jensen	
1951	Hill Number One: A Story of Faith and Inspiration	Stephen	Teleplay, Family Theatre
1951	Only the Valiant	Trooper Saxton	
1953	Slater's Dream	Samuel Slater	Teleplay, Cavalcade of America
1953	Slaves of Babylon	King Cyrus	
1954	King Richard II	Harry Percy	TV movie
1954	Night Must Fall	Dan	Ponds Theater
1954	You Touched Me!		Kraft Theatre
1956	The Honor Code	Cadet Eddie Garley	Teleplay, West Point
1956	Miss Mabel	Peter	Lux Video Theatre
1957	The New Adventures of Martin Kane	Bill Wright	TV series, episode "The Railroad Story"
1957	The Long Christmas Dinner	Sam	TV adaptation of play
1958	Fiend Without a Face	Capt. Al Chester	
1958	The New Adventures of Charlie Chan	Col. Arthur Ross	TV series, episode "Safe Deposit"
1962	Lolita	Man	Final film
1969	Get Smart	Shirtsinger	TV series, episode "Hurray for Hollywood"
