= Ron Randell =

Australian actor (1918–2005)

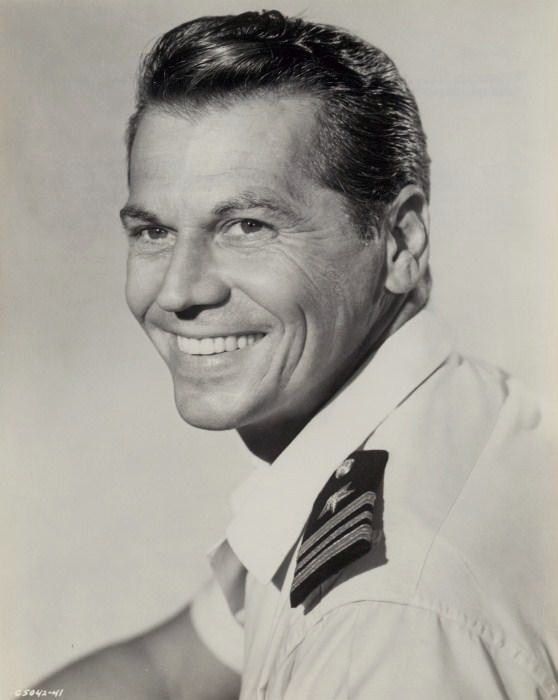
- Randell in Follow the Boys (1963)
- Born: Ronald Egan Randell; 8 October 1918; Sydney, Australia
- Died: 11 June 2005 (aged 86); Woodland Hills, Los Angeles, California, U.S.
- Resting place: Pierce Brothers Westwood Village Memorial Park and Mortuary
- Occupation: Actor
- Years active: 1937–1983
- Spouses: Elaine Diana Maltzman (m. 1948; div. 1949) Marie Keith (m. 1952; div. 1955) Laya Raki (m. 1957)

Ronald Egan Randell (8 October 1918 – 11 June 2005) was an Australian actor. After beginning his acting career on the stage in 1937, he played Charles Kingsford Smith in the film Smithy (1946). He also had roles in Bulldog Drummond at Bay (1947), Kiss Me Kate (1953), I Am a Camera (1955), Most Dangerous Man Alive (1961) and King of Kings (1961).

== Early life and career ==
Randell was the son of Ernest Randell (d. 26 May 1946) and Louisa Egan, who had married in 1912. His father was an accountant, born in Broken Hill.

Randell was born in Sydney and was the youngest of three sons, the others being Reg and Norm. The family lived for a time in Western Australia but eventually settled in Sydney.

Randell attended Marist Brothers School in North Sydney. He left school at the age of 14, and went to work as an office boy in a Sydney finance office.

=== Early career ===
Aged fourteen, Randell participated in a few sketches at a social acting club and did an unpaid job for radio station 2UE. He made his first professional appearance for the ABC at 14 for the Children's Sessions. He soon started acting regularly on children's serials. After eight months, Randell quit his office job to concentrate on acting.

He soon established himself as a leading male juvenile for radio, acting for 2KY Players, George Edwards, BAP and on Lux Playhouse. He also worked as a compère for variety shows, in particular with Jack Davey and did a two-man revue with Lloyd Lamble. He worked in both Sydney and Melbourne.

Randell made his legitimate stage debut aged 19, in a production of Quiet Wedding at the Minerva Theatre in Sydney. Randell later joked, "I moved out of radio and back into theatre because I was becoming a left-hand actor. I would hold the script in my right hand and do all my acting with my left hand."

Most of his stage work at this time was done at the Minerva Theatre, including performances in Of Mice and Men. Randell stated police were ready to arrest the cast of Of Mice and Men because the play featured the word "whorehouse". "Fortunately we received a standing ovation and the police decided in the circumstances not to make any arrests." As late as 1974, Randell would say this was his favourite performance.

In 1943 he was cast in an Australian wartime propaganda film South West Pacific (1943). Unable to serve because he was suffering tuberculosis (although he also claimed it was due to sinus trouble), he travelled to the US in mid 1943 and sought treatment at the Mayo Clinic.

=== US visit ===
In San Francisco he was cast in a stage play with Nancy Carroll. He also appeared on radio with Robert Young in Transport for Adams.

He later related that he had tested for the role of Stanley in Lifeboat (1944) for Alfred Hitchcock, but was unsuccessful – he did the test with an American accent saying he was unaware they were looking for a cockney. Through Cecil Kellaway he got a screen test at Paramount but this was unsuccessful, as was another for 20th Century Fox.

He returned to Sydney in 1944 and resumed his theatre and radio career. He MC'd the show Here are the Facts.

== Film stardom ==
=== Return to Australia and Smithy ===
In October 1944, Randell made his feature film debut in A Son Is Born, opposite Peter Finch and Muriel Steinbeck.

His big break came in November 1944, when he was spotted by producer Nick Perry at the Minerva Theatre performing in While the Sun Shines with Finch. This led to Randell being cast as the lead in Smithy, a biographical film about the pioneering Australian aviator Sir Charles Kingsford Smith, who made the first flight across the Pacific (from the United States to Australia) in 1928. His casting was announced in May 1945. Producer Perry said, "Randell has been selected not only for his achievements as a fine actor, but as the type of virile Australian who embodies the spirit and qualities so typified by 'Smithy.' We have taken a long time over our selection, but we are extremely happy with our choice."

The release of A Son Is Born was held off until after Smithy had come out, to take advantage of its publicity. Smithy was a big hit at the Australian box office, and Randell was widely acclaimed as a local star. A Ron Randell Film Club was established and Randell would be mobbed at personal appearances. It has been argued Randell "was never as good in his American films" as he was in Smithy, "moodiness suited him, as did an Australian accent."

=== Columbia Pictures ===
Smithy had been made with funds from Columbia Pictures; Columbia released it domestically under the title Pacific Adventure. Columbia offered Randell a long-term contract and he moved to Hollywood in October 1946.

Producers Lou Appleton and Bud Small had a deal with Columbia to make a new series of pictures about Bulldog Drummond. According to Appleton, "We wanted a new film face and someone with a British way of speaking." They were impressed with his Smithy footage and put him in Bulldog Drummond at Bay. (It was made for an independent company, Venture, but released through Columbia.)

Columbia liked its new screen personality, and in April 1947 cast Randell in a good support role in an expensive "A" production, It Had to Be You (1947). "I'm grateful for playing opposite people like Ginger Rogers and Cornel Wilde", said Randell. "They really know their business. You can't imagine what it means to get away from those 'Bulldog Drummond' detective roles. I was afraid I'd be typecast and never play anything else."

He was called back for another Bulldog Drummond picture, Bulldog Drummond Strikes Back, which filmed in June 1947 at the same time as The Mating of Millie (1948).

This was followed by The Sign of the Ram (1948) and the $2 million spectacular The Loves of Carmen (1948), where Randell was billed after Columbia's two biggest stars, Rita Hayworth and Glenn Ford. However his part in the final movie was very small.

Randell had been meant to make four Drummond films but only appeared in the two for Columbia. (Producer Small took the Drummond franchise to his father Bernard Small's independent company in January 1948, and Tom Conway took over the role of Drummond.)

Randell was now focused on making more important pictures. "I would like to be busy in a picture every day for the next two years, at least," he said. "With too much free time an actor, I think, loses the emotional pitch at which he works most effectively." He added he preferred comedy to drama, saying "I have a serious face, but I think I have feeling for comedy because I have a light mind." The same month it was reported he had obtained the screen rights to a story Hebridies Adventure by James MacFarlane and was trying to interest Columbia in making it.

Randell wrote a short booklet for publication in Australia, Ron Randell in Hollywood which he dedicated "to the many Australian boys and girls who have given me loyalty and support, and to express the hope that they may enjoy some of my Hollywood experiences with me." One review stated; "as an account of those experiences, ending with some pious aspirations concerning the talkies as an instrument for world peace, it's not too bad."

In February 1948 he was being sought after to appear in a Broadway play The Rats of Norway.

In July 1948, Columbia announced Randell would play one of its long-established detective characters, Michael Lanyard, alias The Lone Wolf, in The Lone Wolf and His Lady (1949), hoping it would lead to more but there was no follow-up. In November 1948 a Washington Post profile called Randell "a lot of fun, looks a bit like James Mason."

Columbia gave him a supporting role opposite Ruth Warrick in the jukebox musical Make Believe Ballroom (1949). "This will be the final major assignment, I understand", said Randell to the Los Angeles Times in September 1948. Filmink magazine later noted this was when Columbia seemed to lose interest in Randell.

== Personal life ==
In October 1948, Randell married for the first time.

In November 1948, Randell was told he needed to leave the country under the terms of his visa. By January 1949, it was announced his Columbia contract had lapsed. He was mentioned as a possible star for a production of Robbery Under Arms by Michael Balcon that was not made.

In April, he appeared in a production of Kraft Television Theatre, Wicked Is the Vine, based on a play by Australian Sumner Locke Elliott. He was in Omoo-Omoo, the Shark God (1949).

=== Return to the stage ===
In July 1949 he appeared on stage in Los Angeles in a production of Major Barbara and said he did not want to make any more "B"s. "I know I've surprised quite a few Hollywood people, because they have never seen me working in something really good", he said. "In Major Barbara I have a chance to be charming and intelligent, a chance I was never given while working in pictures." Randell admitted that his determination to refuse offers in "B" pictures might be "tough on me financially", but he would prefer fewer but better film offers to large numbers of grade "B" roles. I wasn't happy working in those pictures, anyway."

He looked to Broadway and discussed appearing in The Devil's Carnival. Instead he returned to Columbia to appear in a swashbuckler for Sam Katzman, Tyrant of the Sea (1950).

He filmed this at the same time he was cast in a double-bill Terence Rattigan plays, The Browning Version and Harlequinade, supporting Maurice Evans and directed by Peter Glenville. (Glenville cast Randell on the basis of his performance in Major Barbara.) Brooks Atkinson of The New York Times said Randell was "particularly good" in his "curious part". The production did not have a long run and closed in December.

He was announced for a film The Killer that Stalked Broadway with Maurice Evans but it was never made.

Randell was meant to follow Browning Version with The Enchanted but his employment was over-ruled by Actors Equity who said that as a foreigner he should have to wait six months before appearing in another play.

"They have made a martyr of me", said Randell. "It is a horrible thing and a backward step for the United States, which always has been a forward country as far as Equity is concerned. It is the first time I knew any American organisation did not welcome competition. This new part was going to be the big break for me. It would have meant a very great deal to my career. Now I am forced to go without a job for six months, and I can't afford that."

He spent some time in London and considered moving there. Instead he returned to Hollywood to appear in Lorna Doone (1951), although it was a support role – the star was Richard Greene.

He was to have appeared in a stage production of The Corn Is Green but pulled out when Columbia used him again for Counterspy Meets Scotland Yard. He appeared in a play, The Amazing Adele with Ruth Gordon, which was being tried out in Westport. However, he left the production to appear in another, Angel in the Pawnshop. He was cast in a play by Frederick Lonsdale, The Day After Tomorrow. However, before the play went to New York, a production was seen by Sir Cedric Hardwicke whose wife was in the show; it resulted in Randell being replaced by Jack Watling.

Randell returned to movies with China Corsair (1951) at Columbia supporting Jon Hall. He followed it with Captive Women (1952), a low budget science fiction film for RKO, in which Variety said he "occasionally shows himself to be a first rate actor." He had a smaller part in The Brigand (1952) for Edward Small. These were all B-pictures.

In September 1951 Randell went into rehearsals for a production of Candida with Olivia de Havilland. This toured America from October for the next few months, and eventually reached New York. "I don't have any desire to go back to movies", he said. "A good, adult picture, yes. But I don't care if I never do another like the kind I worked in for Columbia Pictures." Brooks Atkinson, reviewing Randell's performance in Candida, said he was "intelligent and manly but... leaves out the pompousness essential to the part and the play". Candida only had a short run on Broadway. This commitment meant he could not be in The Golden Carriage, from Jean Renoir, and Invasion U.S.A., from the makers of Captive Woman.

In August 1952, Randell's name was mentioned in connection with two films to be made about Australia with Paulette Goddard, The Queen's Mask and Melba. He also tried to raise finance for a film about Don Bradman. Of these projects only Melba was made, without Randell.

Randell was in an A picture: The Mississippi Gambler (1953). He also worked extensively in television.

=== Britain ===
By now Randell was frustrated at the progress of his career. According to one report, type cast as "the dull Englishman who invariably lost the heroine to the hero, Randell was in a rut. Feeling he was destined to play an Englishman for ever, Randell decided to go to England, where his chances of getting the girl (and the fans), might improve."

He turned down a support part in The Red Beret and instead supported Michael Denison and Dulcie Grey in a play, Sweet Peril. He took time out from rehearsals to appear in a TV series shot in Germany, Orient Express, starring in the TV special The Blue Camelia. While playing in Sweet Peril he also made the film The Girl on the Pier (1953) and appeared in American Duel on TV for Douglas Fairbanks Jnr. He was interested in producing a play in New York: Pommy by William Lipscomb.

After five months, Randell returned to Hollywood to play Cole Porter in MGM's Kiss Me, Kate (1953). While there he appeared on TV in Where Lovely Women with Arlene Dahl.

=== The Kiss ===
He came to London to appear in a West End production, The Fifth Season. It did not have a long run. Randell appeared in Theatre Royal on the BBC then took over as the Summer replacement for the host of the British TV series What's My Line? in May 1954. He blew a kiss to viewers on air, causing controversy amongst TV critics. It led to a series of offers, including a role in a national tour of Sabrina Fair and a role in I Am a Camera (1955). He was to have been in The Girl Friends directed by Michelangelo Antonioni. but did not appear in the final film.

From October 1954 to December 1955, Randell hosted the ABC anthology series The Vise. In the US he made a pilot to a TV show with Pat Crowley, My Man, Sing and the film Desert Sands (1956).

=== Return to Australia ===
In March 1955, Randell returned to Australia to appear in a stage production of The Caine Mutiny Court Martial. There was an incident when he and fellow members of the play's cast – including Americans Jeffrey Lynn and Lee Tracy – were locked in a hotel room for not paying their bill. The play was not a financial success and only played in Sydney.

== Later career ==
Randell returned to Hollywood to make Frontier Scout (1956), then went to Bermuda for Bermuda Affair (1956).

In October 1955 he got a job in London compering TV show On the Town, replacing Jack Jackson. He had to take a leave of absence to make Beyond Mombasa (1956) in Africa. He had a support role in The Story of Esther Costello (1957) shot in London.

In May 1956 he returned to Hollywood after a six-month absence and appeared in The She-Creature (1956). In September 1956 Randell told the press, "With this present phase of making films all over the world, an actor has to be ready to pack up and keep moving. In one year I have worked in these places, in this order: Hollywood. London, Hollywood, Bermuda, London, and Kenya. It seems I only get home long enough to let the ice freeze in the refrigerator."

In London he starred (with top billing) in The Hostage (1956) for Douglas Fairbanks Jnr and he had a supporting role in the film Davy (1958).

He got a job playing an American in the TV series, O.S.S. (1957–1958). He was going to make Lost Mission with his wife and James and John Woolfe but it appears to have been never made. Neither was The Mystic Confederacy which Randell optioned for his own production company.

"I belong to no one country I guess" said Randell around this time. "Australia must have checked me out some time ago. I'm neither an American citizen nor an English one."

While shooting OSS, Randell heard Joshua Logan was doing a Broadway adaptation of The World of Suzie Wong. Randell's then-wife was Eurasian so they went to Hollywood to meet Logan, hoping she would be cast in the title role. Randell ended up being cast in the third lead, only on stage for ten minutes, with Randell paid $1,000 a week. The play was a big hit.

=== 1960s ===
He had an excellent part in King of Kings (1961), shot in Spain, one of his most acclaimed later performances. He acquired the rights to a novel, Defender's Triumph, and intended to film it as 7 Soho Squared but the film was never made. Randell did play the lead in The Most Dangerous Man Alive (1960) and made a film in Germany, It's a Great Life (1961). He was going to produce and star in a war survival film, Chain of Fear, directed by Leonardo Bercovici but did not appear in it.

Randell returned to Australia briefly to promote King of Kings in late 1961. He said he wanted to make a film in Woolloomooloo based on the Camden Town Murder with Ralph Richardson, but it was not made.

He was also in The Longest Day (1962), as an American war correspondent, Follow the Boys (1963) and Gold for the Caesars (1963). He and his wife wanted to star in and produce an adaptation of Year of the Cricket by John Lorring. He did co-produce The Gallant One (1964), shot in Peru and starring his wife.

He guest starred on The Outer Limits. In 1964, he appeared as Hubert Ambrose in the Perry Mason episode "The Case of the Illicit Illusion".

He guest-starred twice in Bewitched in 1964 and 1967, and played a lead role in the two-part "The Contenders" episode in the series Mission: Impossible in 1968. During this time, Randell played in several European films such as Savage Pampas (1966).

He returned to Australia in 1967 to appear in There's a Girl in My Soup which was very popular. "As an international actor I have no home", said Randell. "My luggage is spread across nine hotels in Europe and America and so are my friends.

Randell remembered doing multiple voices in radio in his old Sydney days, but said "I just couldn't do that sort of thing today if I tried", adding that "I hate radio." He also said Australia should make more local shows.

Randell returned to Australia in 1969 to explore the possibilities of producing a play there, Houseboat in Kashmir, by the team of Jerome and Lee. He was also looking into organising luxury golf tours. He was commuting between the US and London and had recently bought in apartment in London. While in Australia he guest-starred in episodes of local TV series like The Rovers and The Long Arm, and discussed projects with Reg Goldsworthy.

=== 1970s ===
Randell returned to Australia again in 1971 to direct and star in a stage play, Come Live with Me, at the Phillip Street Theatre in Sydney. He had never directed before. He said he intended to co produce a film in Australia called Northward the Coast but it was never made.

He returned to Australia in 1974, to appear in a six-week run of a play, Champagne Complex, at Wrest Point Casino in Hobart. He said he was trying to produce a TV series based on the book Colour of the East by John Russell. However, it was not made. Randell told the press that he was not getting a lot of television work in the USA. "My face is like the Gable sort of face and when he was in fashion so was I. That's the way it works in Hollywood; for years your face is in fashion, then suddenly the Robert Redford face is in or the Al Pacino face... If you're not on TV every night, people think you're dead." He added later that year, "for most of my life I've played phonies... There is no place for an Australian... I think I'm a kamikaze actor at the moment – I think I've arrived at that. It is death or glory for me... I range the world but I'm not a superstar. The insecurity of acting never really bothers me that much. I find now that life is so exciting... The glamorous moments have been very rate. I've been working for more than 30 years and survived... and it's survival that counts."

=== New York ===
In 1975, Randell appeared on Broadway in a production of Sherlock Holmes. The following year he was in Mrs Warren's Profession; The New York Times theatre critic Clive Barnes said he "does very decently". He also appeared in Measure for Measure.

During his later career, Randell worked steadily on Broadway, though rarely in leading roles. His notable appearances included Bent.

Filmink later wrote Randell "had a long and interesting career (eg King of Kings), but never became a star – possibly that’s because he played too many heroes and affable love interests, where he wasn’t that interesting, and not enough villains, where he could be electric."

== Personal life ==
Randell was married three times. He married his first wife, stage actress Elaine Diana Maltzman, in New Canaan, Connecticut, in October 1948. They divorced in 1949.

He was engaged to actress Amanda Blake, and they planned to marry in 1951 but there seems no evidence they went through with their plans.

He was engaged to Marie Keith in September 1952, and they married in October that year. However, they separated in 1953, at which time he was seen with Amanda Blake, who was described as his "former fiancee".

Marie Keith and Randell were divorced in 1955.

He had a romance with Hildegarde Christian then married Laya Raki in 1956, and they remained together until his death in Los Angeles in 2005 following a stroke. He was 86.

== Selected credits ==
=== Filmography ===
- South West Pacific (1943) (short) as U.S. Soldier
- To Have and Have Not (1944) as Naval Ensign (uncredited)
- Smithy (1946) as Charles Kingsford-Smith
- A Son Is Born (1946) as David Graham
- Bulldog Drummond at Bay (1947) as Hugh C. 'Bulldog' Drummond
- Bulldog Drummond Strikes Back (1947) as Bulldog Drummond
- It Had to Be You (1947) as Oliver H.P. Harrington
- The Sign of the Ram (1948) as Dr. Simon Crowdy
- The Mating of Millie (1948) as Ralph Galloway
- The Loves of Carmen (1948) as Andrés
- The Lone Wolf and His Lady (1949) as Michael Lanyard / The Lone Wolf
- Make Believe Ballroom (1949) as Leslie Todd
- Omoo-Omoo the Shark God (1949) as Jeff Garland
- Tyrant of the Sea (1950) as Lt. Eric Hawkins
- Counterspy Meets Scotland Yard (1950) as Agent Simon Langton
- Lorna Doone (1951) as Tom Faggus
- China Corsair (1951) as Paul Lowell
- The Brigand (1952) as Capt. Ruiz
- Captive Women (1952) as Riddon
- The Mississippi Gambler (1953) as George Elwood
- Kiss Me Kate (1953) as Cole Porter
- The Triangle (1953) as Sam (segment "American Duel")
- The Girl on the Pier (1953) as Nick Lane
- One Just Man (1954)
- I Am a Camera (1954) as Clive
- Desert Sands (1955) as Pvt. Peter Ambrose Havers
- Three Cornered Fate (1955) as Host
- Count of Twelve (1956) as Host
- Quincannon, Frontier Scout (1956) as Capt. Bell
- Bermuda Affair (1956) as Chuck Walters
- The She-Creature (1956) as Police Lt. Ed James
- Beyond Mombasa (1956) as Eliot Hastings
- The Hostage (1956) as Bill Trailer
- Morning Call (1957) as Frank Wenzel
- The Girl in Black Stockings (1957) as Edmund Parry
- Davy (1958) as George
- Most Dangerous Man Alive (filmed 1958, released 1961) as Eddie Candell
- King of Kings (1961) as Lucius
- The Phony American (1961) as Captain Smith, USAF
- The Longest Day (1962) as Joe Williams
- Follow the Boys (1963) as Lt. Cmdr. Ben Bradville
- Gold for the Caesars (1963) as Centurion Rufus
- Legend of a Gunfighter (1964) as Al Nutting
- Savage Pampas (1966) as Padrón
- To Chase a Million (1967) as Michael
- Whity (1971, German film) as Benjamin Nicholson
- The Seven Minutes (1971) as Merle Reid
- Exposed (1983) as Curt (final film role)

=== Television credits ===
- Four Star Playhouse (1954)_ –
- Bewitched Series4 Ep18 - Once in a Vial (1967)

=== Radio credits ===
- The Cities Under the Sea (Oct 1937)
- The Fatal Truth (1938)
- Mutiny on the Bounty (radio serial) (April 1938)
- Spy Exchange (1938)
- Dad and Dave (1938) as Dr Clive Ferris
- The Queen's Necklace (November 1938)
- The Woman in White (April 1939)
- The Black Tulip
- Madame X
- Ada Beats the Drum
- Spy Exchange (Aug 1939)
- Lives of a Bengal Lancer (September 1939)
- Wings Above the Diamantina (Sept 1939) based on the story by Arthur Upfield with Randell as Boney
- Joan of Arc (radio serial) (Nov 1939)
- To Death and Back (Dec 1939)
- The First Year (Jan 1940)
- Joan of Arc (Feb 1940)
- Royal Adventure (Feb 1940)
- Spawn of the North (April 1940)
- Another Language (1940)
- Of Mice and Men (April 1940) – cast of stage show
- Star Parade (1941) – compere
- Mutiny on the Bounty (February 1941)
- The Silver King (July 1941)
- Stand Easy (September 1941)
- Cappy Ricks (November 1941)
- The Doctor's Dilemma (December 1941) – produced by Alec Coppel
- Aladdin (Dec 1941)
- Radio Hollywood (January 1942)
- Brewster's Millions (Feb 1942)
- The Sign of the Cross (April 1942)
- Three Men on a Horse (Jan 1942)
- AnoUo (Mar 1942)
- Fanny's First Play (Mar 1942)
- A Man to Remember (Mar 1942)
- Johnny Apollo (Apr 1942)
- Within the Law (May 1942)
- Bought and Paid For (Jul 1942)
- First Light Fraser (Aug 1942)
- Over Here (Nov 1942) – compare of variety show
- It Pays to Advertise (Noc 1942)
- Passport for Adams (1943) – in the US for CBD with Robert Young and Peter van Eyck
- Prisoner at the Bar (1944) – as Roger Casement
- How Green was my Valley
- Love and Diplomacy (May 1945)
- Here are the Facts (June 1945) – compere
- When a Girl Marries (May 1946)
- The Persil Show (October 1946) – variety show, last appearance on Australian radio before heading overseas
- My Cousin Rachel (7 September 1953) – as part of Lux Radio Theater with Olivia de Havilland

=== Theatre ===
- The Spirit Host (April 1937) – Sydney Players Club, St James Hall
- Love on the Dole (February 1940) – Minerva Theatre, Sydney
- Of Mice and Men by John Steinbeck (April 1940) – Minerva Theatre, Sydney – as George
- Banana Ridge (September 1940) – Theatre Royal, Adelaide
- Tony Draws a Horse (October 1940) – Theatre Royal, Adelaide
- Design for Living (November 1940) – Minerva Theatre, Sydney
- Mr and Mrs North (1943) – San Francisco – with Nancy Carroll
- While the Sun Shines (November 1944) – Minvera Theatre, Sydney
- The Voice of the Turtle (April 1945) – Minerva Theatre, Sydney
- Dangerous Corner (Jan 1946) – Minerva Theatre, Sydney
- Major Barbara (July 1949) – Circle Theatre, Los Angeles
- The Browning Version / Harlequinade (October-December 1949) – Coronet Theatre, New York – with Maurice Evans
- The Day After Tomorrow (October 1950)
- Amazing Adele (September 1950) – Westport Country Playhouse
- The Importance of Being Earnest (June 1951) – Santa Monica dinner theatre with Jane Darwell
- Broadway Bill (Aug 1952) – Pasadena Playhouse
- Candida (April–May 1952) – US tour then National Theatre New York – with Olivia de Havilland
- Sweet Peril (December 1952) – London – with Michael Denison and Dulcie Gray
- You Never Can Tell (August 1953) – La Jolla Playhouse
- The Fifth Season (Feb-May 1954) – tour of UK then Cambridge Theatre, London
- Sabrina Fair (August-Nov 1954) – national tour of England
- The Caine Mutiny Court Martial (March–May 1955) – Australian tour
- Favonia (July 1956) – UK tour
- The World of Suzie Wong (Oct 1958–Jan 1960) – Broadhurst Theatre and 54th St Theatre, New York – 508 performances
- Mary, Mary (1963) – Queens Theatre, London – with Maggie Smith
- There's a Girl in My Soup (May-Oct 1967) – Australian tour
- Come Live with Me (Feb 1971) – Philip St Theatre, Sydney
- Butley (Oct 1972–Feb 73) – Morosco Theatre, New York – standby for Alan Bates
- Champagne Complex (1974) – Macleay Theatre, Potts Point, NSW
- Sherlock Holmes (Feb 1975–Jan 76) – Broadhurst Theatre, New York – joined cast during run
- Mrs Warren's Profession (Feb-April 1976) – Vivian Beaumont Theatre, New York – with Lynn Redgrave
- No Man's Land (Nov-Dec 1976) – Longacre Theatre, New York – standby player for Ralph Richardson
- Measure for Measure (1976) – New York
- Tunnel Fever (May 1979) – New York
- Bent (Dec 1979–June 1980) – New Apollo Theatre, New York – with Richard Gere, ran 241 performances
- Measure for Measure (July 1981) – San Diego
- Duet for One (Dec 1981–Jan 82) – Royale Theatre, New York – standby player for Max von Sydow
- Ghosts (June 1982) – Adelphi Festival
- Robert and Elizabeth (October 1982) – Paper Mill Playhouse, Milburn, New Jersey
- The Patrick Pease Motel (March 1984) – Riverwest Theatre, New York
- Manoeuvres (April 1985) – South St Theatre, New York
- Candida in Concert (April 1985) – a one off reading
- Swan Song (November 1986) – Mazur Theatre, New York
- Man for all Seasons (Jan 1987)
- Rozencrantz and Guilderstern are Dead (May 1987) – off Broadway, New York – as Polonius
- King Lear (Nov 1990) – with Hal Holbrook
- Brigadoon (Nov 1991) – New York State Theatre
- The School for Scandal (Nov-Dec 1995) – Lyceum Theatre, New York – with Tony Randall

== Notes ==
- Randell, Ron (June 1946). "Just the Boy Hollywood Wanted". Cavalcade. Vol. 4, no. 1. pp. 28–33.
- Vagg, Stephen (10 August 2019). "Unsung Aussie Actors – Ron Randell: A Top Twenty". Filmink.
