= The Mississippi Gambler (1953 film) =

1953 film

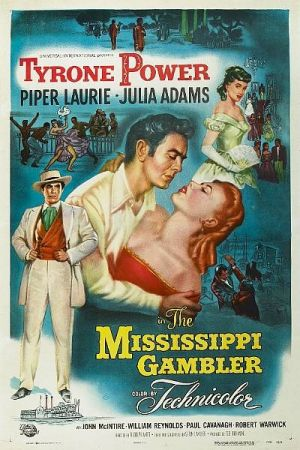
- Film poster by Reynold Brown
- Directed by: Rudolph Maté
- Written by: Seton I. Miller
- Produced by: Ted Richmond
- Starring: Tyrone Power; Piper Laurie; Julia Adams
- Cinematography: Irving Glassberg
- Edited by: Edward Curtiss
- Music by: Frank Skinner
- Color process: Technicolor
- Production company: Universal International Pictures
- Distributed by: Universal Pictures
- Release dates: January 13, 1953 (St. Louis, Missouri)
- Running time: 99 minutes
- Country: United States
- Language: English
- Box office: $5 million

The Mississippi Gambler is a 1953 American Western film directed by Rudolph Maté and starring Tyrone Power. The film was nominated for an Oscar for Best Sound Recording (Leslie I. Carey). This film was the third Universal Pictures film to bear this title—though with a different plot each time, the others being The Mississippi Gambler (1929) and Mississippi Gambler (1942).

== Plot ==
Mark Fallon persuades professional gambler "Kansas John" Polly to teach him the trade. As they board a riverboat bound for New Orleans, Kansas John advises him to be wary of F. Montague Caldwell, an unscrupulous riverboat gambler.

Mark makes the acquaintance of two fellow passengers, attractive Angelique Dureau and her brother Laurent. Laurent loses a great deal of money at poker. He gives Mark a valuable diamond necklace to redeem his gambling IOUs. When Mark learns that it is Angelique's, he offers it back to her, but she angrily declines. Caldwell hires some men to ambush and rob Mark, but a friend warns Kansas John, and he and Mark jump ashore to reach New Orleans alive.

There, he meets the father of Angelique and Laurent, the suave Edmond Dureau, a noted fencer who is impressed by Mark's own skill with the sword. He invites Mark to his home, despite Mark's warning that his son and daughter would not welcome him. Dureau wishes his daughter would feel differently toward Mark, but Angelique instead weds banker George Elwood.

Mark builds a successful casino. He and Edmond also give a helpful hand to Ann Conant, the sister of an unlucky gambler who committed suicide after losing the money entrusted to him by his firm. Laurent falls for Ann, but she is smitten with Mark, so Laurent forces Mark into a duel. As the challenged party, Mark has the choice of weapons; he selects pistols instead of swords. Laurent dishonorably fires prematurely and misses. Mark refuses to shoot back.

Angelique's husband skips town with his bank's money. Mark, who had refused to withdraw his money out of consideration for Angelique, despite widespread disquieting rumors, is left penniless, so he returns to his old life as a gambler. Angelique realizes her true feelings and asks to go along.

== Cast ==
- Tyrone Power as Mark Fallon. Life magazine reported that Power—in lieu of salary—took a 50% participation deal for his work on the film.
- Piper Laurie as Angelique Dureau
- Julia Adams as Ann Conant
- John McIntire as "Kansas John" Polly
- Paul Cavanagh as Edmond Dureau
- John Baer as Laurent Dureau
- Ron Randell as George Elwood
- Ralph Dumke as Caldwell
- Robert Warwick as Paul O. Monet
- William Reynolds as Pierre
- Guy Williams as Andre

Ron Randell had a small role.

== Reception ==
The film was very popular. Life reported that it was Universal-International's biggest moneymaker that year. Variety estimated it had earned box office rentals in America of $3 million by the end of 1953.
