= Closed Exit =

- Directed by: Ignacio F. Iquino
- Written by: José Luis Dibildos; Claus Hardt; Ignacio F. Iquino; Alfonso Paso
- Produced by: Ignacio F. Iquino
- Starring: Viktor Staal; Laya Raki; Albert Matterstock
- Cinematography: Isidoro Goldberger
- Edited by: Günther Jonas; Juan Luis Oliver
- Music by: Augusto Algueró
- Production companies: Despa Film; IFI Producción
- Release date: 14 October 1955
- Running time: 82 minutes
- Countries: Spain; West Germany
- Language: Spanish

Closed Exit (German: Gesperrte Wege, Spanish: Camino cortado) is a 1955 German-Spanish crime film directed by Ignacio F. Iquino and starring Viktor Staal, Laya Raki and Albert Matterstock.

== Cast ==
- Viktor Staal as Juan
- Laya Raki as Cecilia
- Albert Matterstock as Policía
- Franz Muxeneder as Ayudante dueño garito
- Armando Moreno as Miguel
- Eugenio Testa
- Eugenio Domingo as Antonio
- Manuel Otaola as Guardia Civil
- Juan Albert as Antonio
- Enrique Fernández as Locutor (voice)
- Ramón Hernández as Portero
- Concha Ledesma as Bailarina
- José Ocón de Eslava as Coronel de la Guardia Civil
- Ramón Quadreny as Pastor
- Joaquín Soler Serrano as Locutor (voice)
- Josefina Tapias as Vendedora de flores
- Miguel Ángel Valdivieso as Locutor (voice)
- Mahnahén Velasco as Cantante

== Bibliography ==
- Bentley, Bernard. A Companion to Spanish Cinema. Boydell & Brewer 2008.
