= Laya Raki =

German actress (1927–2018)

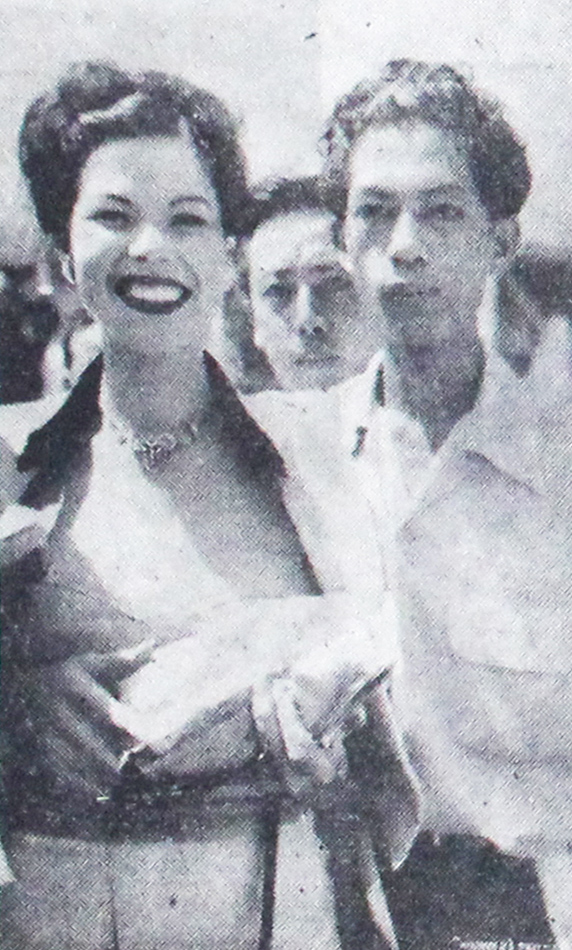
Raki (left) during a 1954 visit to Indonesia

Laya Raki (born Brunhilde Marie Alma Herta Jörns; 27 July 1927 – 21 December 2018) was a dancer and film actress popular in Germany in the 1950s and early 1960s. She also became an international star for her roles in British films and TV productions.

== Biography ==
Laya Raki was born in Hamburg, Germany, to acrobat Maria Althoff, and her partner, acrobat and clown Wilhelm Jörns. As she was an admirer of the famous dancer La Jana and liked to drink raki, she assumed the stage name Laya Raki.

She attracted attention for the first time in 1947–1950 as a dancer in Frankfurt and other German cities. When she performed in Berlin, her star began to rise: her 38–23–36 figure (5.35 ft, 110 lbs) and erotic radiance became the talk of the town.

The film company DEFA engaged her for a small role as a dancer in the film The Council of the Gods, which went on to win two awards. One newspaper, the Berliner Morgenpost, wrote that she was a great dancer with an expressive face rich in nuances. In the same year the press department of Real Film presented her as a new discovery in Die Dritte von rechts ("The Third from the Right"), a dance film, the highlight of which was a scene in which scantily clad dancer Laya Raki (with only two white stars covering her nipples) exposes herself to the male cinema audience. In 1953 she danced in the film Ehe für eine Nacht ("Marriage for One Night"). Her next film was Die Rose von Stambul ("The Rose of Stamboul"), in which the Austrian actor Paul Hörbiger wants to marry her after seeing her dance. In Roter Mohn ("Red Poppy") she plays the gypsy girl Ilonka, who acts opposite Viennese comic actor Hans Moser.

In 1954 she was lured to London by empty promises of film roles in the United Kingdom and in Hollywood. There, she found herself unemployed, but her situation made headlines that soon opened up opportunities. The J. Arthur Rank Film Company, which needed an exotic type for a film in New Zealand, received her with open arms. She was played the role of the Māori chieftain's seductive wife in The Seekers and created a worldwide stir by baring her breasts, 10 years before Rudi Gernreich's topless swimsuit made headline news.

After taking acting lessons in Hollywood, she appeared in several UK TV productions, including 39 episodes of the popular series Crane (1962–1965), which made her a well known actress. Raki starred as Halima, a Moroccan dancer and bartender, who is the partner of the title character, the bar owner and smuggler Richard Crane, played by Patrick Allen.

She appeared in revealing outfits in both film and in photographs, capturing men's attention like no other German showgirl of the 1950s. She modeled for postcards, pin-up photographs, and magazines all over the world. The Broadway columnist Earl Wilson noted her preference for scanty clothing: "You should have seen Laya Raki. Even if she is dressed, she looks like, as if she only wears the zipper and has forgotten the material". He placed photos of her in the first issue of Earl Wilson's Album of Showgirls (1956).

In 1962 she sang and recorded "Faire l'amour" and "Oh Johnny hier nicht parken", which were available as singles and on CD-ROMs. Her latter song was banned by a Nuremberg court who declared her ecstatic moaning was simulating sex.

At the age of 30, Laya Raki married Australian actor Ron Randell in London. "He is the best and most beautiful man of the world", she said. They remained married until his death in Los Angeles on 11 June 2005.

Laya Raki died peacefully on 21 December 2018 at age 91.

== Filmography ==
Year	Title	Role	Notes
1950	The Council of the Gods	Rumbatänzerin / Rhumba dancer	
1950	Third from the Right	Exotic dancer	
1953	Ehe für eine Nacht (Marriage for One Night)	Tänzerin / Dancer	
1953	The Rose of Stamboul	Dancer	
1954	The Beginning Was Sin	Moana	
1954	Up to His Neck	Lao Win Tan	
1954	The Seekers (a.k.a. Land of Fury, a.k.a. Dämonen der Südsee)	Gypsy Dancer	
1955	Die Frau des Botschafters (The Ambassador's Wife)	Manuela	
1955	Closed Exit	Cecilia	
1955	The Adventures of Quentin Durward (a.k.a. Liebe, Tod und Teufel)	Gypsy Dancer	
1956	Küss mich noch einmal	Irina	
1956	Roter Mohn	Ilonka	
1957	Song of Naples (a.k.a. Ascoltami, a.k.a. Das Lied von Neapel, ...und vergib mir meine Schuld)	Carmen Penha	
1957	O.S.S.	Kyro Caro	Episode: "Operation Sweet Talk"
1960	Hawaiian Eye	Betta Dudoit	Episode: "Kim Quixote"
1960	Alcoa Presents: One Step Beyond	Mai Ling	Episode: "House of the Dead"
1962	The Beachcomber	Taffy (Lonika in credits)	2 episodes
1962	Tales of Wells Fargo	The Gypsy Girl	Episode: "The Gold Witch"
1963–1965	Crane	Halima	39 episodes
1963	The Nylon Noose	Nicole	
1963	Das Rätsel der roten Quaste (a.k.a.: Das Geheimmnis der roten Quaste)	Sylvia	
1964	The Gallant One		
1964	Das Haus auf dem Hügel (a.k.a. Le Hibou chasse la nuit)	Suzanne, Bardame	
1965	I Spy	Tia Chang	Episode: "Dragon's Teeth"
1966	Poppies are Also Flowers (a.k.a. Danger Grows Wild (UK), Mohn ist auch eine Blume (Austria, Germany), a.k.a. Opération opium (Fr), a.k.a. The Opium Connection (USA: video title))	Luisa	
1966	Savage Pampas	Mimí	Uncredited (final film role)
