= Song of Naples =

- Film poster
- Directed by: Carlo Campogalliani
- Written by: Carlo Campogalliani; Ugo Guerra; Stefano Ubezio
- Story by: Francesco Granata-Vigo
- Starring: Joachim Fuchsberger
- Cinematography: Giuseppe La Torre
- Music by: Luciano Maraviglia
- Release date: 1 June 1957
- Country: Italy
- Language: Italian

Song of Naples (Italian: Ascoltami, German: Das Lied von Neapel, ...und vergib mir meine Schuld) is a 1957 Italian-German musical melodrama film written and directed by Carlo Campogalliani and starring Joachim Fuchsberger and Janet Vidor. It grossed over 202 million lire at the Italian box office.

== Cast ==
- Joachim Fuchsberger as Max
- Janet Vidor as Giulia
- Franco Silva as Franco
- Nino Milano as Oreste
- Laya Raki as Carmen (credited as Laja Raky)
- Peter Carsten as Ercole
- Luciano Tajoli as Luciano
- Nerio Bernardi
- Anna Campori
- Erminio Spalla
- Renato Chiantoni
