= To Death and Back =

1940 Australian radio serial about Frank Westhover

To Death and Back is a 1940 Australian radio serial about explorer Frank Westhover, best known for his expeditions in New Guinea. Westhover played himself.

Westhoven made his trip in 1935.

The show was announced in 1939 and aired in 1940 (being broadcast first in New Zealand) and again in 1942.

== Premise ==
"The story of a perilous journey in quest of gold in the heart of Papua... This is the first time the full story of the party’s adventures has been told. Listeners will be fascinated with the superstition of the natives, the bush telegraph, the relay of Tom-Tom messages from tribe to tribe, and will be thrilled with the loyalty of the brave Pugini."

== Cast ==
- Frank Westhover as himself
- Ron Randell as Alikio, his guide
- John Saul
- Marshall Crosby
- Osman Wenban
- Cecil Perry
- Eric Pearce
