= The Texas Rangers (1951 film) =

1951 film by Phil Karlson

- Directed by: Phil Karlson
- Screenplay by: Richard Schayer
- Story by: Frank Gruber
- Produced by: Bernard Small
- Starring: George Montgomery; Gale Storm
- Cinematography: Ellis W. Carter
- Edited by: Al Clark
- Music by: Paul Sawtell
- Color process: Supercinecolor
- Production company: Edward Small Productions
- Distributed by: Columbia Pictures
- Release date: June 3, 1951
- Running time: 74 minutes
- Country: United States
- Language: English

The Texas Rangers is a 1951 American SuperCinecolor Western film directed by Phil Karlson and starring George Montgomery and Gale Storm.

== Plot ==
Johnny Carver and Buff Smith are released from jail by the head of the Texas Rangers to help capture outlaw Sam Bass, who has been terrorizing Texas. The men appear to be planning a double cross in league with the outlaws until the big holdup of a gold train when they fight on the Rangers' side.

== Cast ==
- George Montgomery as Johnny Carver
- Gale Storm as Helen Fenton
- Jerome Courtland as Danny Bonner
- Noah Beery Jr. as Buff Smith
- William Bishop as Sam Bass
- John Litel as Major John B. Jones
- Douglas Kennedy as Dave Rudabaugh
- John Dehner as John Wesley Hardin
- Ian Macdonald as the Sundance Kid
- John Doucette as Butch Cassidy
- Jock O'Mahoney as Duke Fisher
- Charles Trowbridge as Texas Governor (uncredited)

== Production ==
George Montgomery had previously appeared in two Westerns for Edward Small, and The Texas Rangers was produced by Small's son Bernard.

The railroad scenes were filmed on the Sierra Railroad in Tuolumne County, California.

== Reception ==
In a contemporary review for The New York Times, critic Bosley Crowther wrote: "We cannot suggest that you are likely to encounter an element of surprise ... unless, that is, you have never before seen a Western film. ... There is nothing original about the story nor about the acting ... We can't say the SuperCinecolor in which it is filmed is either super or fair, but the action is as good as, or maybe better than, any of the sort you're likely to see on TV."

== See also ==
- List of American films of 1951
