= I Am a Camera (film) =

1955 British comedy-drama film

- Region 2 DVD cover
- Directed by: Henry Cornelius
- Screenplay by: John Collier
- Based on: The Berlin Stories by Christopher Isherwood (book); I Am a Camera by John Van Druten (play)
- Produced by: John Woolf
- Starring: Julie Harris; Laurence Harvey; Shelley Winters; Ron Randell; Lea Seidl; Anton Diffring
- Cinematography: Guy Green
- Edited by: Clive Donner
- Music by: Malcolm Arnold
- Production company: Remus Films
- Distributed by: Independent Film Distributors
- Release date: 21 July 1955
- Running time: 98 minutes
- Country: United Kingdom
- Language: English
- Box office: £144,666 (UK)

I Am a Camera is a 1955 British independent comedy-drama film based on the 1945 book The Berlin Stories by Christopher Isherwood and the 1951 eponymous play by John Van Druten.

The film is a fictionalized account of Isherwood's time living in Berlin between the World Wars. Directed by Henry Cornelius, from a script by John Collier, I Am a Camera stars Laurence Harvey as Isherwood and Julie Harris recreating her Tony Award-winning performance as Sally Bowles.

Censors in both the United Kingdom and United States demanded considerable emendations to the film which led to significant deviations from the source material by Van Druten and Isherwood. Although critically unsuccessful upon its release, the film became a smash hit at the 1955 British box office. Long overshadowed by Cabaret, the 1966 stage and 1972 film adaptation of the same source material, contemporary critics have noted the historic interest of this earlier presentation.

== Plot ==
In contemporary London, Christopher Isherwood attends a literary party for the launch of a memoir, the author of which he is surprised to learn is Sally Bowles. This knowledge sparks a reverie, and the film flashes back to Berlin, New Year's Eve 1931. Broke and frustrated with his writing, Christopher plans to spend the night in, but his would-be gigolo friend Fritz insists they go to a night club to see Fritz's new inamorata, Sally Bowles, perform. Fritz hopes to live off Sally's earnings as a film star, but his ardour quickly cools at the sight of her fiancé Pierre, with whom she plans to leave for Paris that night. Instead, Pierre absconds with her money. Chris, taking pity on her, invites her to stay at his boarding house. They arrange for Chris to move to a smaller room, and for Sally to take his old room. Over the course of a long and unproductive winter, in which Chris cannot write, and Sally finds no work, Chris attempts to initiate a sexual relationship with Sally. She rejects him, saying it would spoil their friendship.

Their spirits renewed by the Spring, Christopher and Sally splurge on a Champagne cocktail at a café, and Sally quickly orders far more cocktails and caviar than they can afford. They are extricated from the situation by wealthy American socialite Clive Mortimer, who pays their bill and takes them on a tour of Berlin night spots. Thus begins a whirlwind relationship between the three, culminating in a planned trip to Honolulu. The trip never happens, as Clive wires that his plans have changed. Chris and Sally have a terrible fight, resulting in a rift in their friendship, and Sally's planned departure.

Feeling as though he has reconnected with real life, the formerly a-political Christopher starts a street altercation with a group of Nazis. Returning home, he discovers that Sally has not left, because she is pregnant. Christopher proposes marriage, but Sally refuses him.

Writing up an account of his Nazi altercation, Chris sells his "Portrait of Berlin" to an American magazine to raise money for Sally to have an abortion. The magazine editor hires Chris to write a series of portraits of European cities, expecting him to leave the following day. When he returns home, Sally has changed her mind; she plans to keep the baby and marry Chris. The next morning, Sally tells Chris that she has miscalculated the dates, and was never actually pregnant. She is also leaving Berlin for Paris, in pursuit of a film executive with whom Clive has connected her.

Back in present-day London, Christopher and Sally reunite. Upon learning that Sally is again penniless and homeless, Chris invites her to stay in his spare room.

In a subplot, Fritz tries to secure the affections of Natalia Landauer, a wealthy Jewish department store heiress and Christopher's student of English. When Natalia fails to respond to his charms, Sally suggests that he "pounce", i.e., make a sexual advance. He reports that this tactic is unsuccessful, and Natalia refuses to see him. Fritz confesses to Christopher that he is Jewish and has been concealing it for years, but vows to stop lying about his heritage. Their story concludes with Fritz and Natalia's announcement to Chris and Sally that they plan to marry and emigrate to Switzerland.

== Cast ==
- Julie Harris as Sally Bowles
- Laurence Harvey as Christopher Isherwood
- Shelley Winters as Natalia Landauer
- Ron Randell as Clive Mortimer
- Lea Seidl as Fräulein Schneider
- Anton Diffring as Fritz Wendel
- Ina De La Haye as Herr Landauer
- Jean Gargoet as Pierre
- Stanley Maxted as Curtis B. Ryland, editor
- Alexis Bobrinskoy as proprietor, Troika
- André Mikhelson as head waiter, Troika
- Frederick Valk as doctor
- Tutte Lemkow as electro-therapist
- Patrick McGoohan as Swedish water therapist
- Julia Arnall as model
- Richard Wattis as man at book launch (uncredited)

== Production ==
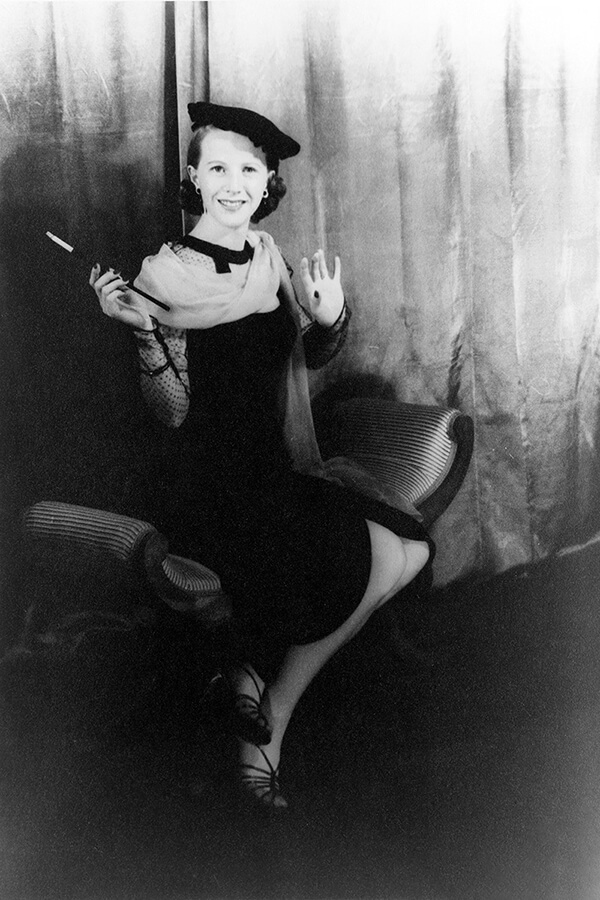
For the 1955 film, Julie Harris recreated her stage performance as Sally Bowles. Her performance in the 1951 play had garnered rave reviews.

After the play had a successful West End run in 1954, film producers John and James Woolf began exploring the idea of adapting Van Druten's play for the screen. In April 1954, director Henry Cornelius and the Woolfs sent a copy of the play to the British Board of Film Censors (BBFC) for evaluation. The Board's preliminary report found numerous problems with the play which, if unchanged, would inevitably lead to an X certificate (no one under 16 admitted). The Board's initial report offered suggestions for how the play could be adapted to secure an A certificate (suitable for children if accompanied by an adult), including shifting the play's focus away from Sally Bowles, but recognized that such changes were unlikely because of how markedly they would depart from the original play.

Director Henry Cornelius asked Isherwood to write the screenplay. He was forced to decline, as he was engaged working on the screenplay for Diane, a biopic of Diane de Poitiers, for Metro-Goldwyn-Mayer in Hollywood.

The first draft of John Collier's screenplay was submitted to the BBFC in October 1954. While the screenplay was being prepared, the Board sent four different examiners to see the play. Each agreed that the play as written was unsuitable for filming, although one held out hope that modifications could be made to allow for the A rating. The BBFC demanded changes to the script, including insisting that Sally Bowles be left poor and unsuccessful at film's end because of her sexual promiscuity in the Berlin flashbacks. Negotiations between film-makers and the Board continued through November. Finally, on 29 November, a resolution was reached which left film-makers prepared for the likelihood that the film would be certified X regardless.

Filming commenced in mid-October 1954. Cornelius had wanted to film in Berlin, but was unable to because of currency issues with the studio. Isherwood had hoped to be in London for the filming, but his lover Don Bachardy was unable to secure the permission of his local draft board to obtain a passport.

Ron Randell was cast on the strength of his stage and TV reputation.

== Ratings and certification ==
The BBFC reviewed I Am a Camera on 9 May 1955, and objected to a single line of dialogue ("Surely he hasn't got a crush on shoes at his age?") that carried an implication of foot fetishism. With that line replaced, the film received an X certificate. In 1961, Associated-Rediffusion asked the BBFC to review the film, hoping to secure an A certificate so as to broadcast the film on television. While acknowledging that the subject matter was mild in light of subsequent films like Room at the Top, Look Back in Anger, and Saturday Night and Sunday Morning, the BBFC found that the abortion subject matter prevented re-certification without re-editing.

Upon its American release, I Am a Camera was denied the Production Code Administration seal of approval. Joseph Breen of the PCA had reviewed a copy of the Van Druten play as early as May 1953, and deemed it to have multiple Code violations. His recommendations were sent to John Van Druten, who disregarded them. The PCA's Geoffrey M. Shurlock, in denying PCA approval to the finished film, cited "gross sexual promiscuity on the part of the leading lady without the proper compensating moral values required by the Code". This included the film's treatment of the subject of abortion. Many cinemas would not run the film without the seal.

Fred J. Schwartz, head of American distributor Distributors Corporation of America, tried to schedule a hearing with the Motion Picture Association of America in August 1955, hoping to overturn the PCA decision and obtain the seal. Schwartz hired civil liberties lawyer Morris Ernst, and scheduled a screening at the Museum of Modern Art in November, hoping to turn the film into a test case against the Production Code. However, the film did not rally the critical support it would have needed to defy the code in the way that the 1953 film The Moon Is Blue had. In February 1956, Schwartz wrote to Shurlock offering to include an additional scene in which Harvey as Isherwood condemned Sally's promiscuity, but would not address the subject of abortion. The Production Code section on abortion was revised in December 1956, and Schwartz once again appealed to Shurlock. Shurlock responded later that month, re-affirming the denial on the basis of the light treatment of the subject matter. Following this denial, Schwartz dropped his pursuit of the seal.

On 25 August 1955, the National Legion of Decency condemned I Am a Camera, and at least one cinema pulled the film in response to attacks on the film by Catholic priests.

== Box Office ==
The film was one of the most popular at the 1955 British box office. According to Kinematograph Weekly it was a "money maker" at the British box office in 1955.

== Reception ==
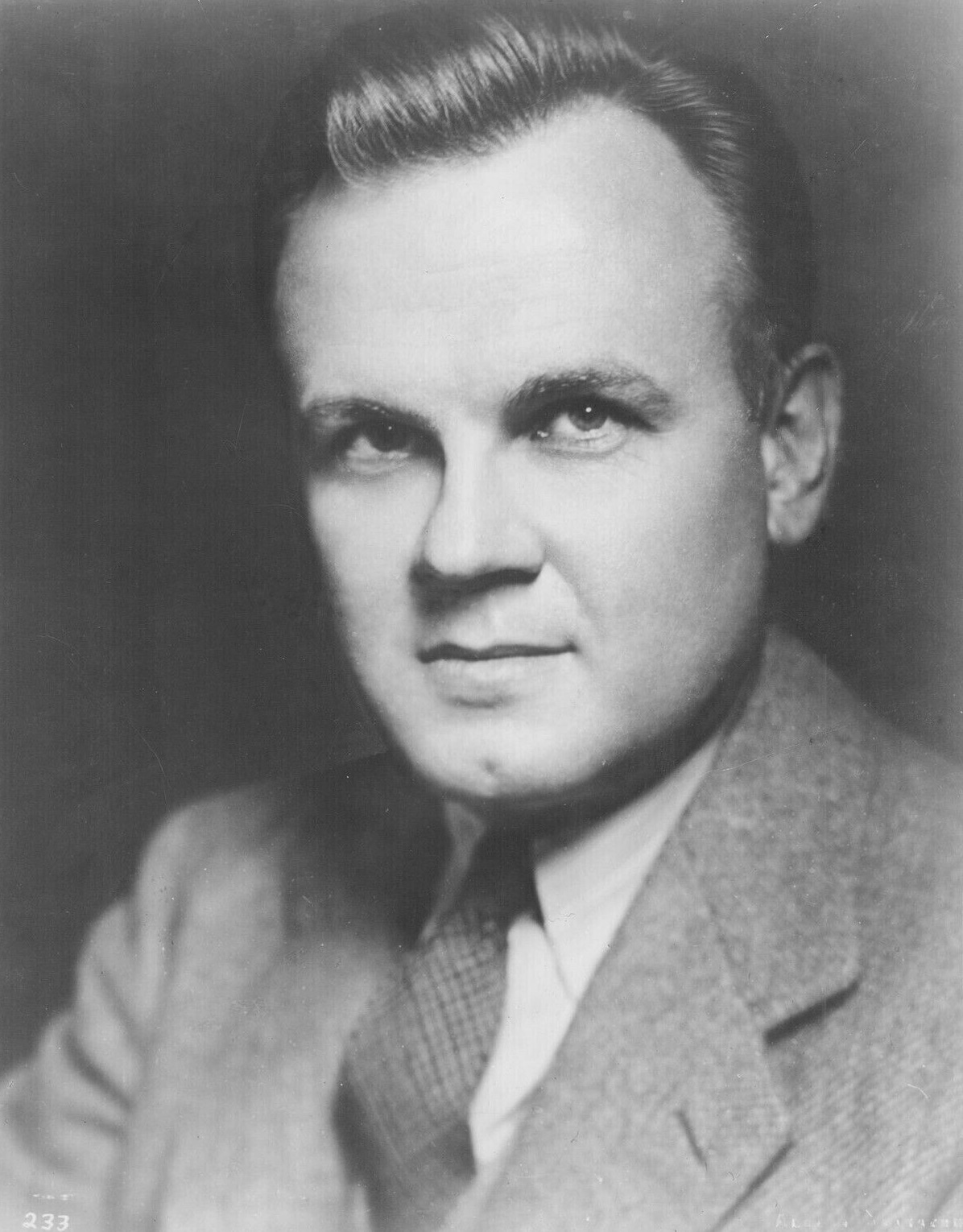
The New York Times film critic Bosley Crowther blasted the film's script by John Collier for largely discarding the original source material by Van Druten and Isherwood.

British critics were nearly uniform in their disappointment with I Am a Camera, with negative reviews appearing in the Evening News, the Daily Telegraph, the Financial Times, the Daily Mirror, the News Chronicle, and Tribune. Each believed that Laurence Harvey had been miscast as Isherwood. For the most part, they agreed that Harris's performance was a bright spot, although the Daily Sketch expressed a preference for Dorothy Tutin, who had played Sally on stage in 1954.

Bosley Crowther of The New York Times gave I Am a Camera a bad review, finding it "meretricious, insensitive, superficial, and just plain cheap". Crowther was particularly appalled by John Collier's script, blasting it for largely abandoning both the Van Druten and Isherwood source material. He also sharply criticized the abortion material, deeming it a "capstone of cheap contrivance and tasteless indelicacy". Julie Harris he labelled a "show-off", while Laurence Harvey is "an anxious straight man for her jokes", with all parties directed by Cornelius with no eye to any subtlety of character.

In an August 1955 pictorial, LIFE magazine called the film's party sequence "violently funny". LIFE praised Harris's acting, while at the same time finding the film spends too much time on Harris's character. Still, LIFE felt confident in predicting the film's success.

Julie Harris was nominated for a 1956 BAFTA Award for Best Foreign Actress.

Isherwood recorded his distaste for the film in his diary, noting his attendance at a 22 June 1955 preview. He found the film "a truly shocking and disgraceful mess. I must admit that John Collier is largely to blame – for a sloppy, confused script. But everything is awful - except for Julie, who was misdirected." In a letter to friend John Lehmann, Isherwood called the film "disgusting ooh-la-la, near pornographic trash – a shameful exhibition".

On the occasion of its video release in 1985, Lawrence Van Gelder, for The New York Times, found that this film, while suffering in comparison with the more lavish Cabaret, is still charming in its way, mostly because of Harris's performance as Sally.

Phil Hall reviewed I Am a Camera for Film Threat in 2005. He questioned the casting of Harvey as Isherwood, saying that the role called for a light comedic touch that was never Harvey's forte. Harvey's underplaying of the part, he wrote, clashes with Harris's unrestrained stage-style performance of hers. Still, he found that the film is "an intriguing curio" that garners interest for its exploration of the anti-Semitism that gave rise to the Nazis, and for its handling of "touchier aspects" of the original sources, including Isherwood's homosexuality (Note: Isherwood lived as more or less openly gay in Berlin, but concealed his homosexuality in the source material; the film would state only that the character Isherwood was a "confirmed bachelor".) and Sally's abortion, which became a false pregnancy scare for the film.
