= War Paint (1953 film) =

1953 film by Lesley Selander

- Theatrical release poster
- Directed by: Lesley Selander
- Written by: C Fred Freiberger; William Tunberg; Aubrey Schenck (uncredited)
- Produced by: Howard W. Koch; Aubrey Schenck
- Starring: Robert Stack; Joan Taylor
- Cinematography: Gordon Avil
- Edited by: John F. Schreyer
- Music by: Arthur Lange; Emil Newman
- Color process: Pathécolor
- Production companies: Bel-Air Productions; K-B Productions
- Distributed by: United Artists
- Release date: August 28, 1953 (United States)
- Running time: 85 minutes
- Country: United States
- Language: English

War Paint is a 1953 American Western film directed by Lesley Selander and starring Robert Stack and Joan Taylor. A U.S. Cavalry lieutenant is assigned to deliver a peace treaty to a powerful Indian chief, but two Indians have vowed to kill the officer before he completes his mission.

The film was shot in Pathecolor and filmed on location in Death Valley National Park.

== Plot ==
The pre-credit sequence of the film starts out with Bureau of Indian Affairs Commissioner Kirby and the last survivor of his US Cavalry escort shot and scalped by Taslik (Keith Larsen) and his squaw Wanima (Joan Taylor).

The film proper begins with Lt. Billings (Robert Stack) leading his patrol, that has escorted Cpl Hamilton (Charles Nolte), a cartographer who has been making maps of the area. On the way back to the fort they are met by a messenger (Robert J. Wilke), who brings orders that they are to meet Commissioner Kirby (Richard H. Cutting) and his party at a trading post in order to deliver a recently signed Indian treaty from Washington to the chief of the local tribe. The messenger gives the treaty to the Lieutenant, who commandeers him to join his patrol. The patrol, who are unaware of the fate of Kirby and his party, have nine days to get the treaty to the chief, lest a new uprising start.

At the trading post is Taslik, who offers to lead the patrol to the chief. Taslik is wearing war paint that he explains is from his killing members of a rival tribe who have trespassed on his tribe's land.

Unknown to the patrol, Taslik and Wanima, who is shadowing the patrol, are strongly against the peace treaty. The two sabotage the patrol's supplies at every turn in various undetected ways. On their journey the patrol discovers the remains of Commissioner Kirby's escort.

The patrol finally get wise to Taslik when they discover that he has led them in a giant circle looking for water. With time rapidly vanishing, Lt. Billings collects all the remaining water of the rapidly diminishing patrol to fill one water bottle. This is given to Trooper, former Corporal Clancy, who is to make his way overland to the Indian village while the rest of the men conserve their strength by traveling only at night. Wanima ambushes the trooper and kills him but is wounded herself and becomes unconscious.

At night the patrol discovers what has happened, but Billings refuses to kill Wanima. This causes discontent among the patrol, who have lost other members through poisoned water (Perkins) and suicide (Hamilton). Wanima agrees to lead the patrol to water but leads them to an abandoned gold mine, creating further discontent. After a brief struggle between the troopers, Wanima, and Billings, Wanima resents leading them to water. With renewed strength and the knowledge of the gold, some remaining troopers (Tolson, Grady, and Martin) plot to collect the gold and flee. When discovered a shootout occurs, ultimately only Billings and Wanima survive, finally arriving at the village to deliver the treaty.

== Cast ==
As appearing in screen credits (main roles identified):

- Robert Stack as Lt. Billings
- Joan Taylor as Wanima
- Charles McGraw as Sgt. Clarke
- Keith Larsen as Taslik
- Peter Graves as Trooper Tolson
- Robert Wilke as Trooper Grady
- Walter Reed as Trooper Allison
- John Doucette as Trooper Charnofsky
- Douglas Kennedy as Trooper Clancy
- Charles Nolte as Cpl. Hamilton
- James Parnell as Trooper Martin
- Paul Richards as Trooper Perkins
- William Pullen as Jeb
- Richard Cutting as Commissioner Kirby

== Production ==
War Paint was the first film of Howard W. Koch and Aubrey Schenck's Bel-Air Productions, who were initially signed to do three films for United Artists. As Schenck was then under contract to RKO Pictures, he did not have his name on the screenplay credits, though he initially wrote the story. Schenck recalled that when it looked as though the film financing wouldn't come in on time, Robert Stack offered to provide the money himself.

The initial draft of the screenplay featured a mercy killing to which the Production Code of America objected.
