= The Seekers (1954 film) =

1954 film

The Seekers; Land of Fury (USA)
- USA theatrical release poster
- Directed by: Ken Annakin
- Written by: William Fairchild
- Based on: The Seekers by John Guthrie
- Produced by: George H. Brown
- Starring: Jack Hawkins; Glynis Johns; Noel Purcell; Laya Raki; Inia Te Wiata
- Cinematography: Geoffrey Unsworth
- Edited by: John D. Guthridge
- Music by: William Alwyn
- Production companies: Fanfare Productions; Group Film Productions
- Distributed by: General Film Distributors; Universal-International Pictures (US)
- Release date: 22 June 1954
- Running time: 90 minutes
- Countries: United Kingdom; New Zealand
- Languages: English; Māori
- Budget: £250,000

The Seekers is a 1954 British-New Zealand adventure film directed by Ken Annakin. It starred Jack Hawkins, Glynis Johns, Noel Purcell, and Kenneth Williams. The film was produced by the Rank Organisation and was shot at Pinewood Studios with location shooting around Whakatāne. The film's sets were designed by the art director Maurice Carter with costumes by Julie Harris. It was the first major international studio film shot in New Zealand. The film was adapted from the novel The Seekers by New Zealander John Guthrie. It was released in the United States by Universal Pictures as Land of Fury.

Annakin said it "was not my greatest triumph as a filmmaker, but an enjoyable experience in living — something I was beginning to recognise as just as important as the actual movie process."

== Plot ==
In 1821, a British sailing ship, the Becket, anchors off the New Zealand coast. Philip Wayne and Paddy Clarke, respectively First Mate and Bos'un, land to explore. They discover a Māori burial cave, but are captured by the local tribe. Accused of sacrilege, they manage to impress the tribesmen enough to be offered a trial by challenge, in which Wayne succeeds. The Māori chief, Hongi Tepe, is impressed enough to adopt Wayne and allot him a portion of land. The sailors return to the ship which sails back to England.

Arriving there, Wayne and Clarke are set up by the corrupt Captain Bryce on charges of murdering the natives and bringing Britain into disrepute because they have a severed Māori head in their trunk. This had been presented to Wayne as a traditional gift by the Māori chief, but, rejected by him, Bryce had recovered it. Found guilty, Wayne and Clarke have to pay heavy fines to avoid imprisonment. Wayne decides to leave Britain to find a new life and to return to New Zealand. Nevertheless, his fiancée, Marion Southey, still wants to marry him. They sail over, with Clarke, on a private ship and Wayne builds a house close to the Māori tribe he had met before.

The house is completed and a tenuous peace is established with the local Māori, although some remain hostile. Marion starts teaching Hongi Tepe and some others English, using the Bible, and tells them about her Christian religion. The chief's wife Moana hovers around Wayne frequently.

The Becket returns and Wayne confronts Bryce, who is found to be smuggling severed heads of dead Māori captives into Britain as potentially profitable 'souvenirs'. News later arrives by the six-monthly ship that Wayne has been appointed a justice of the peace for his locality, and also that he and Clarke have been exonerated by a court of appeal.

Wishart and Sergeant Paul join the small group just as Marion finds herself pregnant. After the birth, Moana follows Wayne when he goes hunting, and as he settles down to sleep she joins him and they kiss. Hongi Tepe sees them and wants to kill Moana, as is the tribal custom, but his new-found Christianity sways him to let her live. However, a rift between the English and Māori begins.

Wishart accidentally shoots a Māori's dog (thinking it is a goat) and the owner starts fighting him. His gun goes off and shoots the warrior dead. The Māori capture Wishart. Wayne is determined to dispense justice, telling the Māori that he is acting with the authority of his own powerful king. The chief's loyalties are also torn as he knows about Wayne's treachery. Wayne gets Wishart away by promising the Māori that he will be returned to England for trial by his own people. However, they then fear a reprisal attack by the Māori.

Wayne tells Marion that he has been "unfaithful" and although deeply hurt she says she still loves him. Meanwhile, Hongi Tepe's tribe has formed a truce with their local enemy, and the enemy tribe declare a desire to kill the colonists. Moana hears this and goes to warn Wayne, but she is waylaid by the hostile Māori.

A battle begins in the night, and the colonists defend themselves. Initially successful because of their muskets, the colonists eventually find themselves outnumbered and under siege. The attackers use large catapults and fire-bombs to set the house alight. Hongi Tepe's tribe appear and start fighting their old enemies. In mid-battle, Wayne saves Hongi Tepe's life by shooting his attacker. As the battle appears won, Wishart is killed by a spear, and then, with the house ablaze, the roof collapses, killing all the colonists.

The sole British survivor is Marion's young baby, Richard, whom Marion had secreted in a safe place outside, and who is found and adopted by Hongi Tepe. Finally, the friendly Māori watch a new group of colonists arriving on the beach.

== Cast ==
- Jack Hawkins as Philip Wayne
- Noel Purcell as Paddy Clarke
- Glynis Johns as Marion Southey
- Inia Te Wiata as Hongi Tepe
- Kenneth Williams as Peter Wishart
- Laya Raki as Moana
- Thomas Heathcote as Sgt. Paul
- Francis De Wolff as Capt. Bryce
- Norman Mitchell as Grayson
- Ian Fleming as Mr. Southey
- James Copeland as Mackay
- Henare Gilbert as Aspiti Tohunga

== Production details ==
=== Development ===
The film was based on a novel by John Guthrie published in 1953.

Ken Annakin had made Hotel Sahara with producer George Brown, who had sent the director several scripts afterwards, none of which Annakin wanted to make. However he was interested in The Seekers in part because it was set in New Zealand where Annakin had lived. Annakin said, "It was based on a novel which was historically true, but the script which playwright Bill Fairchild was writing seemed to me to be full of cliches and boring characters. However, I felt I could put these things right on the location shoot." However Annakin was told by the producer that the film would be made entirely in the studio at Pinewood for money reasons.

Brown did a location scout in New Zealand in June 1953.

=== Casting ===
Jack Hawkins was attracted to the role of Philip Wayne because it represented a change of pace from the war films in which he had become a star. It was the first in a six-picture detal Hawkins had signed with Rank. Annakin later wrote he felt Hawkins "much as I liked him, seemed too old and well fed" for his part.

Eight Māori actors were imported from New Zealand along with opera singer Inia Te Wiata to play the chief Hongi Tepe.

Kenneth Williams was cast in a small role as Peter Wishart. He wrote to a friend, "It is a sort of psycho neurotic coward on the brink of adulthood and all that sort of stuff, the kind of script that falls into every conventional pattern with stock situations and cliché dialogue which is sometimes full of revolting sentimentality, but one cannot help oneself. One is at the mercy of these kind of employers and one wants the money."

Javanese-German actress Laya Raki was cast as a Māori. A publicist for the film said:

Laya has a strong Polynesian cast of feature. We had tested several Māori girls, some of them beautiful, but somehow the cameras didn't take to them. You know how people photograph differently from the way they really look... Well, when we stumbled across Laya Raki and tested her, she photographed ideally for the part. She looks more like a Māori than a Māori.

=== Filming ===
Filming took place in October 1953. Annakin said "We did our best with it during shooting, but the premise and the casting were ridiculous. The part in the opening reel about the creation of the Māori world was all right; the rest was junk."

The bulk of the movie was shot at Pinewood Studios. It was subsequently decided to film some sequences in New Zealand in January 1954 using a skeleton crew of sixteen plus Hawkins, Noel Purcell and Laya Raki. The unit was based out of Whakatāne with scenes shot at Lake Rotoiti and Rotorua. There was a twelve-day shoot including travel plus some documentary shots. Annakin recalled, "it was a fourteen-day continuous shoot and the shop steward caused us to miss the geyser blowing because the tea wagon hadn’t arrived for the morning break! I stayed behind with the cameraman and we did a lot of ‘doubling’ ourselves."

== Release ==
The world premiere of the film was held in Wellington, New Zealand on 24 June 1954. There were simultaneous premieres in other cities.

== Reception ==
=== Critical ===
Variety wrote "Considerable care and imagination have been lavished on this epic tale... hundreds of Māori providing authentic background. It is a powerful story of pioneering days in the last century, marred by man’s weakness and betrayal. But its interpretation falls short of the author’s conception, the camerawork and native players providing better value than the stars."

FilmInk called it "silly but watchable and fascinating in its depiction of 19th century New Zealand, complete with a horny Tondeleyo-like sexpot who lures Jack Hawkins away from Glynis Johns; there is splendid location footage and a genuinely surprising ending where (spoilers) all the white leads are killed by Maoris."

=== Box office ===
According to Kinematograph Weekly the film was a "money maker" at the British box office in 1954. However Variety said "Rank took a box office beating with" the film.

== Citations ==
- Annakin, Ken (2001). So you wanna be a director?. Tomahawk Press.
