= John Guthrie (novelist) =

NZ journalist, novelist, short-story writer

John Guthrie (9 July 1905 – 14 March 1955), real name John Brodie, was a New Zealand journalist and novelist from New Plymouth who moved to London in 1938. He wrote several novels about New Zealand and New Plymouth.

He was born in New Plymouth and educated at New Plymouth Boys' High School and at Canterbury University College (BA and Diploma in journalism). While studying at Canterbury College aged 26, he suffered a broken leg in a rugby accident and the leg subsequently had to be amputated; he had been regarded as a potential All Black to represent New Zealand.

He wrote his first novel The Little Country about pioneer life in 19th-century New Plymouth while recovering in bed from the rugby accident. Together with Paradise Bay, they are regarded as New Zealand classics; the English critic Marghanita Laski wrote that Paradise Bay was "an excellent book and a potential New Zealand classic if ever there was one". However, Paradise Bay has been called "thin and contrived" by comparison with his first novel. The novel The Seekers was filmed in 1954 as The Seekers. Along with The Little Country, both novels were controversial in New Plymouth as some locals thought they recognised themselves in the novels.

He moved to London in 1938, and in World War II was an intelligence officer in the Royal Air Force. Postwar in London, he edited Books of Today and then was assistant editor of World's Press News.

He married his American wife Elinor Roddam in 1952; they had no children. While returning to England from a ten-week visit to New Zealand, he died at sea from coronary thrombosis on the liner Rangitikei. The Times reported that "Mr John Brodie, a New Zealand novelist who wrote under the pen name "John Guthrie" died at sea suddenly on Monday evening at the age of 49".

== Novels and other books by John Guthrie (John Brodie) ==
- The little country (1935)
- So they began (1936)
- The man in the shadows (1937) short story, published in magazine The Grand, April 1937
- The man in our lives (1946) a biography of his father
- Journey by twilight (1949)
- Merry-go-round (1950)
- Is this what I wanted (1950)
- The Seekers (1952). A film of the book was made in 1954.
- Paradise Bay (1952)
