= Lord Jeff =

1938 film by Sam Wood

- Directed by: Sam Wood
- Written by: Bradford Ropes (story); Endre Bohem (story); Val Burton (story); James Kevin McGuinness; Frank Davis (uncredited); Walter Ferris (uncredited); Sam Wood (uncredited)
- Produced by: Frank Davis; Sam Wood
- Starring: Freddie Bartholomew; Mickey Rooney; Charles Coburn
- Cinematography: John F. Seitz
- Edited by: Frank E. Hull
- Music by: Edward Ward
- Production company: Metro-Goldwyn-Mayer
- Distributed by: Metro-Goldwyn-Mayer
- Release date: June 17, 1938
- Running time: 85 minutes
- Country: United States
- Language: English

Lord Jeff is a 1938 MGM American film set in England and starring Freddie Bartholomew, Mickey Rooney, Charles Coburn, Herbert Mundin and Gale Sondergaard. The film was directed by Sam Wood.

== Plot ==
Young orphan "Lord" Geoffrey Braemer poses as an English aristocrat for con artists Jim Hampstead and Doris Clandon, who assumed care of him when his parents were killed in a train wreck. He fakes fainting in a jewelry store, distracting the employees and allowing Jim to steal a valuable necklace. However, an astute insurance investigator catches him and Geoff is sent to Russell-Cotes, a mercantile marine school, and is warned that if he does not behave, he will be transferred to a reformatory.

The school's headmaster Captain Briggs assigns Terry O'Mulvaney to guide Geoff. However, Geoff does not wish to assimilate into the student population. He only wants to return to London to be reunited with Doris and Jim, although he waits in vain for a letter from them. He antagonizes all of the other boys except the irrepressibly cheerful Albert Baker.

While at a banquet in the town, Geoff escapes. Terry finds him and, after a fight, returns him to school. However, it is very late at night, and Terry is caught sneaking into the dormitory. When he refuses to mention Geoff to excuse his actions, he is stripped of his rank and loses his chance of securing a coveted job on the luxury liner RMS Queen Mary. Geoff smugly refuses to reveal his part, angering the other boys, who refuse to speak to him at all.

The bleak isolation begins to bother Geoff, although he tries to hide his misery. He learns several life lessons under the mentoring of kindly and wise instructor "Crusty" Jelks. Geoff confesses his runaway attempt to Captain Briggs, knowing that it could lead him to the reformatory, so that Terry might be reinstated for the Queen Mary job. He asks Captain Briggs to refrain from informing the boys that the information clearing Terry came from him.

When Doris and Jim finally manage to contact Geoff, he refuses to return to his crooked life and tells them that he will sail on the Queen Mary. As the stolen necklace is too well-known in England, Jim sews it inside Geoff's coat when Geoff is not looking and books passage aboard the Queen Mary, bound for the United States. Briggs selects Terry and Geoff to join the crew of the Queen Mary. However, the necklace is found at the school, forcing Geoff to choose between conflicting loyalties. He chooses to defy Doris and Jim, but they have gone missing. Geoff is questioned by the police, jeopardizing his chance to take the sea voyage. Luckily, one of his schoolmates recognizes Doris and Jim on the Queen Mary, and they are arrested in time for Geoff to board the ship and join Terry.

== Cast ==
- Freddie Bartholomew as Geoffrey Braemer
- Mickey Rooney as Terry O'Mulvaney
- Charles Coburn as Captain Briggs
- Herbert Mundin as Bosun "Crusty" Jelks
- Terry Kilburn as Albert Baker
- Gale Sondergaard as Doris Clandon
- Peter Lawford as Benny Potter
- Walter Tetley as Tommy Thrums
- Peter Ellis as Ned Saunders
- George Zucco as Jim Hampstead
- Matthew Boulton as Inspector Scott
- John Burton as John Cartwright
- Emma Dunn as Mrs. Briggs
- Monty Woolley as Jeweler
- Gilbert Emery as Magistrate
- Charles Irwin as Mr. Burke
- Walter Kingsford as Superintendent

== Reception ==
In a contemporary review for The New York Times, critic Frank S. Nugent wrote: "It's a compact little fairy tale, as such things go, as predictable as one of our old Annapolis or West Point films and about as easy to accept. The only appreciable difference is in the physical dimensions of the players—most of them are cut down to Freddie's size—and in the range and thickness of their accents Things considered, Master Freddie does well to be a problem child."
