= Bermuda Affair =

- Directed by: A. Edward Sutherland
- Produced by: Coolidge Adams; A. Edward Sutherland
- Starring: Gary Merrill; Kim Hunter; Ron Randell
- Cinematography: Harry W. Smith
- Edited by: Stanley Willis
- Music by: Elisabeth Lutyens
- Production company: Bermuda Studio Productions
- Distributed by: Columbia Pictures
- Release date: July 1956
- Running time: 77 minutes
- Country: United States
- Language: English

Bermuda Affair is a 1956 adventure drama film directed by A. Edward Sutherland, starring Gary Merrill, Kim Hunter and Ron Randell. Bermuda Affair was the final film directed by Eddie Sutherland.
