= The Phony American =

1961 film

- Directed by: Ákos Ráthonyi
- Starring: Michael Hinz; Christine Kaufmann; William Bendix; Ron Randell
- Release date: 22 December 1961 (West Germany)
- Country: West Germany
- Language: German

The Phony American (German: Toller Hecht auf krummer Tour) is a 1961 West German film. It stars William Bendix and Ron Randell.

== Cast ==
- Michael Hinz as Helmut Krauss
- Christine Kaufmann as Inge
- William Bendix as Sergeant Harrigan
- Ron Randell as Captain Smith
- Karl Lieffen as Moritz
