= The Extraordinary Seaman =

1969 film by John Frankenheimer

- Directed by: John Frankenheimer
- Screenplay by: Phillip Rock and Hal Dresner
- Based on: a story by Phillip Rock
- Produced by: Edward Lewis
- Starring: David Niven; Faye Dunaway; Mickey Rooney; Jack Carter; Alan Alda
- Cinematography: Lionel Lindon
- Edited by: Fredric Steinkamp
- Music by: Maurice Jarre
- Production companies: An Edward Lewis Production; A John Frankenheimer Film
- Distributed by: Metro-Goldwyn-Mayer
- Release date: December 11, 1969
- Running time: 80 minutes
- Country: United States
- Language: English

The Extraordinary Seaman is a 1969 American comedy war film directed by John Frankenheimer and starring David Niven, Faye Dunaway, Alan Alda, Mickey Rooney, and Jack Carter. Apart from his participation in the documentaries That's Entertainment! (1974), and That's Entertainment! III (1994), the film is notable for being the last film Mickey Rooney acted in which was released by Metro-Goldwyn-Mayer, his studio during the period of his major stardom during the 1930s and 1940s.

== Plot ==
Towards the end of World War II four United States Navy sailors—the accountant Lieutenant Krim, the cook Oglethorpe, the gunner's mate Toole, and the Cheyenne seaman Lightfoot—are separated from their ship and are marooned on an island in the Philippines. They discover the British Royal Navy officer, Commander Finchhaven, aboard the wreck of the gunboat HMS Curmudgeon. Finchhaven persuades them to launch an attack on Japanese positions, hoping to redeem the family honor and his own tattered record from the First World War. The sailors repair the ship with help from garage owner Jennifer Winslow. After launching the ship, Finchhaven confesses he is a ghost condemned to sail the seas forever after falling down drunk before his first battle in the Great War. With his typical luck he actually succeeds in sinking an Imperial Japanese Navy cruiser -- after it had officially surrendered to the US Navy. As a result, he is seen again consigned to sailing his ship forever, this time in a children's amusement park lake, to await another war for a chance at redemption.

== Cast ==
- David Niven as Lt. Commander Finchhaven, R.N.
- Faye Dunaway as Jennifer Winslow
- Alan Alda as Lieutenant (junior grade) Morton Krim
- Mickey Rooney as Cook 3rd Class W.J. Oglethorpe
- Jack Carter as Chief Gunner's Mate Orville Toole

== Production ==
Metro-Goldwyn-Mayer purchased the rights to Philip Rock's novel The Extraordinary Seaman in 1967. The film was primarily shot in Yucatán and Coatzacoalcos, Mexico, as well as at MGM studios in Culver City, California and in Santa Barbara, California. The film was divided into six sections named after the volumes of Winston Churchill's The Second World War.

== Reception ==
This film was widely panned by the critics and barely achieved any kind of a commercial release. Director John Frankenheimer said in an interview that of all the films he directed this was his least favorite. He said it was the only film which he ever made that he considered "an absolute disaster from beginning to end".

== See also ==
- List of American films of 1969
