= Bernard Small =

American film producer (1918–2003)

- Born: September 7, 1918; New York City
- Died: May 21, 2003 (aged 84)
- Other names: Buddy Small
- Occupation: Film producer
- Father: Edward Small

Bernard "Buddy" Small (September 7, 1918 – May 21, 2003) was an American film producer of low-budget action films and Westerns. He co-produced two Bulldog Drummond films with Louis Appleton Jr. Small also partnered with Ben Pivar as the head of Reliance Pictures, an independent company that produced films for release by 20th Century Fox as well as other studios.

He was the son of film producer Edward Small of Edward Small Productions, who collaborated with him on several projects, including The Iroquois Trail (1950).

== Selected credits ==
=== Producer ===
- Bulldog Drummond at Bay (1947)
- Bulldog Drummond Strikes Back (1947)
- 13 Lead Soldiers (1948)
- The Challenge (1948)
- The Creeper (1948)
- The Iroquois Trail (1950)
- The Texas Rangers (1951)
- Indian Uprising (1952)

=== Associate Producer ===
- Davy Crockett, Indian Scout (1950)
