= Most Dangerous Man Alive =

1961 film by Allan Dwan

- Theatrical release half-sheet display poster
- Directed by: Allan Dwan
- Screenplay by: James Leicester; Phillip Rock
- Based on: The Steel Monster by Phillip Rock; Michael Pate; Leo Gordon
- Produced by: Benedict Bogeaus
- Starring: Ron Randell; Debra Paget; Elaine Stewart
- Cinematography: Carl Carvahal
- Edited by: Carlo Lodato
- Music by: Louis Forbes
- Color process: Black and white
- Production companies: Benedict Bogeaus Production; Trans Global Films
- Distributed by: Columbia Pictures
- Release date: July 4, 1961
- Running time: 81 minutes
- Country: United States
- Language: English

Most Dangerous Man Alive is a 1961 American science fiction film, produced by Benedict Bogeaus directed by Allan Dwan (the final film of his long career), that stars Ron Randell, Debra Paget, and Elaine Stewart. The film was distributed by Columbia Pictures.

== Plot ==
Gangster Eddie Candel is framed for a crime he didn't commit. Escaping from the police he flees to the desert, stumbling by accident into an atomic bomb testing site.

Eddie is exposed to high levels of radiation, and his body begins to transform in remarkable ways. With his new mental and a near steel physical body, he sets out to take revenge against all those who betrayed him. His first target is rival gangster Andy Damon, who took over his gang and framed him for the murder. Andy fights back, but Candel's new near invulnerability makes his efforts useless. Damon does manage to kill Candel's gang girlfriend.

Candel's ex-girlfriend and a sympathetic scientist attempt to help him and dissuade him from this course of action but are unsuccessful. The scientist wants to study how Candel survived despite being exposed to so much radiation

The National Guard (United States) is called in and uses flame throwers to end Candel's life, turning him to dust.

== Cast ==
- Ron Randell as Eddie Candell
- Debra Paget as Linda Marsh
- Elaine Stewart as Carla Angelo
- Anthony Caruso as Andy Damon
- Tudor Owen as Dr. Meeker
- Gregg Palmer as Lt. Fisher
- Morris Ankrum as Capt. Davis

== Production ==
The genesis of the film is a bit vague. One source says the film began as a story by Leo Gordon called The Atomic Man. Gordon went to fellow actor Michael Pate to rewrite the story. Needing money, Gordon sold his rights to Pate who took the story to his brother-in-law, screenwriter Phillip Rock.

The screenplay was written by James Leicester and Phillip Rock and is based on The Steel Monster by Phillip Rock, Michael Pate, and Leo Gordon. Michael Pate also co-wrote the script.

Producer Benedict Bogeaus had wanted to shoot the film as a television pilot (a common creative practice of the time), to be shown on TV as three episodes, should it be picked up for syndication. Traveling to Mexico to begin shooting in 1960, Mexican film syndicates ruled that it was actually a feature film and demanded Bogeaus make it using a full crew, which would now have to be paid at feature film labor rates. With the budget now tripled, director Allen Dwan claimed he had to shoot the feature in one week, instead of five (some members of the cast disputed this statement). Dwan said:

What should have been shot in five weeks was done in one. And everything in interiors - nothing built. The actors didn’t want to stay. All they wanted to do was get home. And I was in the awkward position of trying to keep it together with all this schism going on around us. So I gritted my teeth and battled it. And that’s not fun. Nobody cared a damn. So it was just get it in the box and get home. A misfit from start to end.

It was Randell's last leading role.

== Release ==
The film was made in 1958 but not released until 1961. According to Dwan

They just didn’t let it escape until then. They were probably short of a picture so they let it get out. It might have just been an accident. Though Bogeaus sold it to Columbia at a flat price that was more than it cost. The studio thought they were buying a big bargain - they didn’t know how cheaply it had been made.

== Reviews ==
Variety called the film "a grade B melodrama" that "will not be a very handy item to have around."

The New York Times in a contemporary review warned the readers away from this movie, finding it be so bad the audience was laughing in the wrong places.

Fantastic Musings was kindlier to the movie, citing its ability to make the main character sympathetic. It did note similarities to the Lon Chaney Jr. movie The Indestructible Man

Film Fanatic found little to praise here other than effective cinematography.

== Home media ==
Most Dangerous Man Alive was released by Cinema Rarities as a manufactured on demand two-disc DVD-R set. It contains both the widescreen and pan-and-scan TV release versions. The widescreen is transferred from a surviving TV syndication print and contains occasional local station identifiers, etc.

== Notes ==
=== Bibliography ===
- Warren, Bill. Keep Watching the Skies!: American Science Fiction Movies of the Fifties, The 21st Century Edition. Jefferson, North Carolina: McFarland & Company, 2009. ISBN 978-0-89950-032-4. Covers science fiction films made from 1950 through 1962. 1040 pages.
