= Bulldog Drummond Strikes Back (1947 film) =

1947 film by Frank McDonald

- Directed by: Frank McDonald
- Written by: Lawrence Edmund Taylor (adaptation by)
- Screenplay by: Edna Anhalt & Edward Anhalt
- Produced by: Louis B. Appleton Jr. & Bernard Small
- Starring: Ron Randell; Gloria Henry; Patrick O'Moore; Anabel Shaw; Terry Kilburn
- Cinematography: Henry Freulich
- Edited by: Richard Fantl
- Production company: Columbia Pictures
- Distributed by: Columbia Pictures
- Release date: September 4, 1947
- Running time: 65 minutes
- Country: United States
- Language: English

Bulldog Drummond Strikes Back is a 1947 American adventure crime mystery film directed by Frank McDonald and starring Ron Randell, Gloria Henry and Patrick O'Moore. The film is loosely based on the H. C. McNeile novel Knock-Out.

It was the second of Randell's performances as Drummond following Bulldog Drummond at Bay.

== Cast ==
- Ron Randell as Bulldog Drummond
- Gloria Henry as Ellen Curtiss
- Patrick O'Moore as Algy Longworth
- Anabel Shaw as Ellen Curtiss II
- Terry Kilburn as Seymour
- Holmes Herbert as Inspector McIver
- Wilton Graff as Cedric Mason
- Matthew Boulton as William Cosgrove
- Barry Bernard as Vincent Cummings
- Carl Harbord as Inspector Sanderson

== Production ==
The Bulldog Drummond series had been popular B movies before the war. In June 1946 it was announced Venture Pictures, a Columbia producing unit headed by Lou Appleton and Bernard Small, had done a deal with the estate of H.C. McNeile to make two Bulldog Drummond pictures, starting with Bulldog Drummond at Bay, with an option to provide six more. In November 1946, it was announced that Drummond would be played by Ron Randell, an Australian actor who was signed to a long-term contract with Columbia off the back of his performance in Smithy.

In February 1947 it was announced the second Drummond film was Bulldog Drummond Strikes Back. The following month Frank MacDonald signed to direct and Gloria Henry was announced as Randell's co star.

Filming started May 1947.

== Bibliography ==
- Treadwell, Lawrence P. (2001). The Bulldog Drummond Encyclopedia. Jefferson: McFarland & Company. ISBN 978-0-7864-0769-9.
