= The Mating of Millie =

1948 film by Henry Levin

- Australian film poster
- Directed by: Henry Levin
- Screenplay by: Louella MacFarlane; St. Clair McKelway
- Story by: Adele Comandini
- Produced by: Casey Robinson
- Starring: Glenn Ford; Evelyn Keyes; Ron Randell
- Cinematography: Joseph Walker
- Edited by: Richard Fantl
- Music by: Werner R. Heymann
- Color process: Black and white
- Production company: Columbia Pictures
- Distributed by: Columbia Pictures
- Release date: March 8, 1948
- Running time: 87 minutes
- Country: United States
- Language: English

The Mating of Millie is a 1948 American romantic comedy film directed by Henry Levin and starring Glenn Ford, Evelyn Keyes and Ron Randell. It was produced and distributed by Columbia Pictures.

== Plot ==
Millie McGonigle is riding a bus home from work when the frustrated driver, Doug Andrews, stops the vehicle and quits. As the assistant personnel director of a large department store, Millie is impressed by his independence and hands him her business card.

The next day, Millie learns that Tommy Bassett, a young boy she knows and likes very much, has lost his mother in a traffic accident. With his father already killed in World War II, Tommy is sent to a foundling home. An orphan herself, Millie quickly decides to adopt him, but learns from Ralph Galloway, the head of orphan's home, that she must be married to adopt the boy. Desperate, she invents a fiancé on the spot (conveniently away in Alaska), but Ralph insists on interviewing her phantom boyfriend within 60 days.

When Doug shows up looking for a job, Millie considers him very suitable husband material (as does the rest of her all-female staff) and accepts an invitation to a date. However, Doug senses that there is something odd going on and gets her to confess what she is trying to do. Doug lets her know that he is a confirmed bachelor; however, he is willing to help the no-nonsense businesswoman land a spouse.

Doug's lessons prove highly effective. Both the staid, respectable Ralph and the much more dashing Phil Gowan, Millie's neighbor, fall in love with her. By this time though, Millie has lost her heart to Doug.

After Doug, an aspiring writer, learns that his book is going to be published, he quits his job at the department store and prepares to go to New York to work with the publisher. Then a couple takes an interest in adopting Tommy. Ralph informs a distraught Millie that her 60 days are up, gets her to admit there is no fiancé, and asks her to marry him. Instead, she accepts Phil's proposal. When she informs Doug, he advises her never to tell her future husband why she is marrying him, because "A man likes to think he's loved for himself alone."

Millie finds she cannot go through with the marriage. She makes an agonizing choice; she decides to chase after Doug rather than keep on fighting for Tommy. When she goes to see Tommy for the last time, Ralph informs her that the boy had been taken an hour before. Heartbroken, she returns to her lonely apartment, only to find Doug there. She kisses him repeatedly, confessing that she loves him even more than Tommy. He is unmoved, brusquely ordering her to go wipe the smudged lipstick from her face. When she does, she finds Tommy sleeping on her bed, while Doug stands behind her with a smile on his face.

== Cast ==
- Glenn Ford as Doug Andrews
- Evelyn Keyes as Millie McGonigle
- Ron Randell as Ralph Galloway
- Willard Parker as Phil Gowan
- Jimmy Hunt as Tommy Bassett
- Mabel Paige as Mrs. Hanson
- Virginia Hunter as Madge
- Virginia Brissac as Mrs. Thomas

== Production ==
In June 1946, Columbia bought a story The Mating of Millie McGonigle from Adele Commandini for $50,000.

The following month Columbia announced it would promote story editor Frances Manson to produce; it was rare for women to produce officially at the time, but Columbia had had a huge success with Virginia Van Upp in Gilda. In April 1947 Henry Levin was assigned to direct. By June it was announced that Casey Robinson would produce and Evelyn Keyes and Glenn Ford would star. The film was the fifth time Keyes and Ford worked on together. Keyes remarked that Ford had appeared discontented during production, acting unusually withdrawn and aloof. It was an early role for Australian actor Ron Randell.

Filming started June 1947.

== Reception ==
The New York Times critic Bosley Crowther described the film as "Rather painful confusion about a young lady (Evelyn Keyes) who needs a husband so she can adopt a child."
