= Patrick O'Moore =

Irish actor

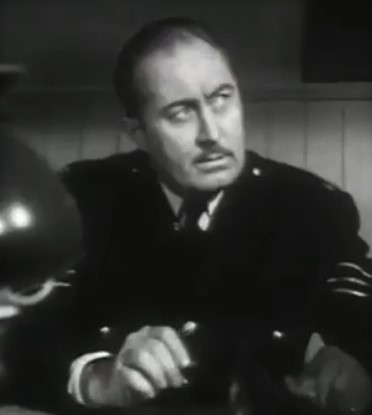
- Born: 8 April 1909; Dublin, Ireland; United Kingdom
- Died: 10 December 1983 (aged 74); Van Nuys, Los Angeles, United States
- Occupation: Actor
- Years active: 1934–1983 (film & TV)

Patrick O'Moore (8 April 1909 – 10 December 1983) was an Irish actor who appeared in a variety of American films and television shows. A character actor, he appeared in a number of Hollywood's British-themed films during the 1940s and 1950s.

O'Moore's Broadway credits included Ladies in Retirement (1940) and Yesterday's Magic (1942).

O'Moore married actress Zelma O'Neal. They later were divorced.

== Selected filmography ==
- Evensong (1934) - Bob O'Neil
- Kathleen Mavourneen (1937) - Minor Role (uncredited)
- The Get-Away (1941) - Minor Role (uncredited)
- Smilin' Through (1941) - Willie
- Captains of the Clouds (1942) - Fyffe
- Desperate Journey (1942) - Squadron Leader Lane-Ferris
- Springtime in the Rockies (1942) - Travel Clerk (uncredited)
- Assignment in Brittany (1943) - Commando Lookout (uncredited)
- The Moon Is Down (1943) - Bombardier (uncredited)
- Tonight We Raid Calais (1943) - English Pilot (uncredited)
- Stage Door Canteen (1943) - Australian
- Sahara (1943) - Osmond 'Ozzie' Bates
- Between Two Worlds (1944) - Steamship Clerk (uncredited)
- Marine Raiders (1944) - Australian Doctor - Field Hospital
- Tonight and Every Night (1945) - David Long
- The Horn Blows at Midnight (1945) - Hotel Clerk (uncredited)
- Conflict (1945) - Det. Lt. Egan
- Molly and Me (1945) - Ronnie
- To Each His Own (1946) - Rangy Cockney Sergeant (uncredited)
- Rendezvous 24 (1946) - Agent George Timothy
- G.I. War Brides (1946) - Harold R. Williams
- Cloak and Dagger (1946) - The Englishman
- The Two Mrs. Carrolls (1947) - Charles Pennington
- Bulldog Drummond at Bay (1947) - Algy Longworth
- Moss Rose (1947) - George Gilby (uncredited)
- Bulldog Drummond Strikes Back (1947) - Algy Longworth
- The Exile (1947) - Cavalier (uncredited)
- Hills of Home (1948) - Barker for Peep Show (uncredited)
- The Fighting O'Flynn (1949) - Maj. Steele
- Challenge to Lassie (1949) - Soldier (uncredited)
- Three Came Home (1950) - Australian POW (uncredited)
- The 13th Letter (1951) - Intern (uncredited)
- Soldiers Three (1951) - Cavalryman (uncredited)
- Kind Lady (1951) - Constable Orkin
- Thunder on the Hill (1951) - Mr. Smithson
- The Highwayman (1951) - Loyalist (uncredited)
- The Son of Dr. Jekyll (1951) - Joe Sorelle (uncredited)
- At Sword's Point (1952) - LaValle's Man / Monk (uncredited)
- Bwana Devil (1952) - Ballinger
- Million Dollar Mermaid (1952) - Master of Ceremonies (uncredited)
- Niagara (1953) - Detective (uncredited)
- Rogue's March (1953) - Major Bennett (uncredited)
- Titanic (1953) - Relief Man (uncredited)
- The Desert Rats (1953) - Jim (uncredited)
- Dangerous When Wet (1953) - Bob Gerrard (uncredited)
- Khyber Patrol (1954) - Brissard
- Jungle Gents (1954) - Alfie Grimshaw
- The Sea Chase (1955) - British Officer of the Watch (uncredited)
- Moonfleet (1955) - Officer (uncredited)
- The Virgin Queen (1955) - Postillion Rider (uncredited)
- The Black Whip (1956) - Governor
- Trooper Hook (1957) - Col. Adam Weaver
- The Unknown Terror (1957) - Dr. Willoughby
- Pawnee (1957) - Colonel (uncredited)
- Copper Sky (1957) - Colonel Thurston
- Ride a Violent Mile (1957) - Bartender (uncredited)
- In the Money (1958) - Reggie (uncredited)
- Cattle Empire (1958) - Rex Cogswell
- Blood Arrow (1958) - McKenzie
- Desert Hell (1958) - Pvt. Corbo
- The Rookie (1959) - Ship's Captain Weiss
- The Courtship of Eddie's Father (1963) - Man in Door (uncredited)
- Promises! Promises! (1963) - Ship's Captain (uncredited)
- What a Way to Go! (1964) - Minor Role (uncredited)
- The Twilight Zone (1964)
- 3 Nuts in Search of a Bolt (1964) - Edwards
- My Fair Lady (1964) - Man (uncredited)
- Signpost to Murder (1964) - Second Guard (uncredited)
- How to Succeed in Business Without Really Trying (1967) - Media Man No. 1
- Hello Dolly! (1969) - Officer Gogarty (uncredited)
- The Resurrection of Zachary Wheeler (1971) - Martin
- The Mechanic (1972) - Old Man
- Frasier, the Sensuous Lion (1973) - Worcester
- The Sword and the Sorcerer (1982) - Devereux

== Bibliography ==
- Keaney, Michael F. Film Noir Guide: 745 Films of the Classic Era, 1940–1959. McFarland, 2003.
- Raw, Laurence. Character Actors in Horror and Science Fiction Films, 1930–1960. McFarland, 2014.
