= Phillip Rock =

American actor

Phillip George Rock (July 30, 1927 - April 3, 2004) was an American actor, author and screenwriter.

== Biography ==
Phillip Rock was the son of Vitagraph silent film star, producer and director Joe Rock and Australian silent film actress Louise Granville and was the nephew of assistant director, cameraman and actor Murray Rock.

He was raised in both England and Beverly Hills then become a page at CBS. He made his motion picture debut as a film actor in The Mask of Dimitrios (1944). He served in the United States Navy towards the end of World War II. After completing his naval service Rock made some more film appearances and began writing screenplays.

In 1951 Rock's older sister actress Felippa Rock married the Australian actor Michael Pate. Pate and Rock collaborated on the story that became the screenplay of Escape from Fort Bravo (1953), Rock's first screenwriting credit. The pair later cooperated on the screenplay for Allan Dwan's final film Most Dangerous Man Alive (1960).

In 1967 Rock made his debut as a novelist with a novelization of his screenplay The Extraordinary Seaman for John Frankenheimer. The film was shot in 1967 but not released until 1969 with what some feel was tampering of the screenplay and completed film by MGM. The experience led Rock to vow to never have any of his novels made into films.

His next novel was The Dead in Guanajuato (1968) set in Mexico where Rock worked on The Extraordinary Seaman.

In 1969 he began a series of novelisations of successful Hollywood films such as The Cheyenne Social Club (1969), ...tick...tick...tick... (1970), Dirty Harry (1971), A Gunfight (1971), Hickey & Boggs (1972), and High Plains Drifter (1973) that led him to the attention of Ernest Tidyman. Tidyman had Rock assist him with his 1974 novel Dummy with Rock writing manuscripts for his later Shaft novels Goodbye Mr. Shaft (1973) and The Last Shaft (1975).

Rock returned to writing novels with Flickers (1977) loosely based on his father's career in 1920s Hollywood. He followed this with a trilogy of novels of an English family of the 1920s the Stanmores of Abbingdon Pryory with The Passing Bells (1979), Circles of Time (1981) and A Future Arrived (1985).

Rock died of cancer in 2004 and was survived by his son film actor Kevin Rock and two grandchildren.
