= Swiss Family Robinson (1940 film) =

1940 film by Edward Ludwig

- Film poster
- Directed by: Edward Ludwig
- Written by: C. Graham Baker; Walter Ferris; Gene Towne
- Based on: The Swiss Family Robinson by Johann David Wyss
- Produced by: C. Graham Baker; Gene Towne
- Starring: Thomas Mitchell; Edna Best; Freddie Bartholomew; Terry Kilburn; Tim Holt
- Narrated by: Orson Welles (uncredited)
- Cinematography: Nicholas Musuraca
- Edited by: George Crone
- Music by: Anthony Collins
- Production company: The Play's The Thing Productions
- Distributed by: RKO Radio Pictures
- Release date: February 8, 1940
- Running time: 92 minutes
- Country: United States
- Language: English
- Budget: $681,000
- Box office: $890,000

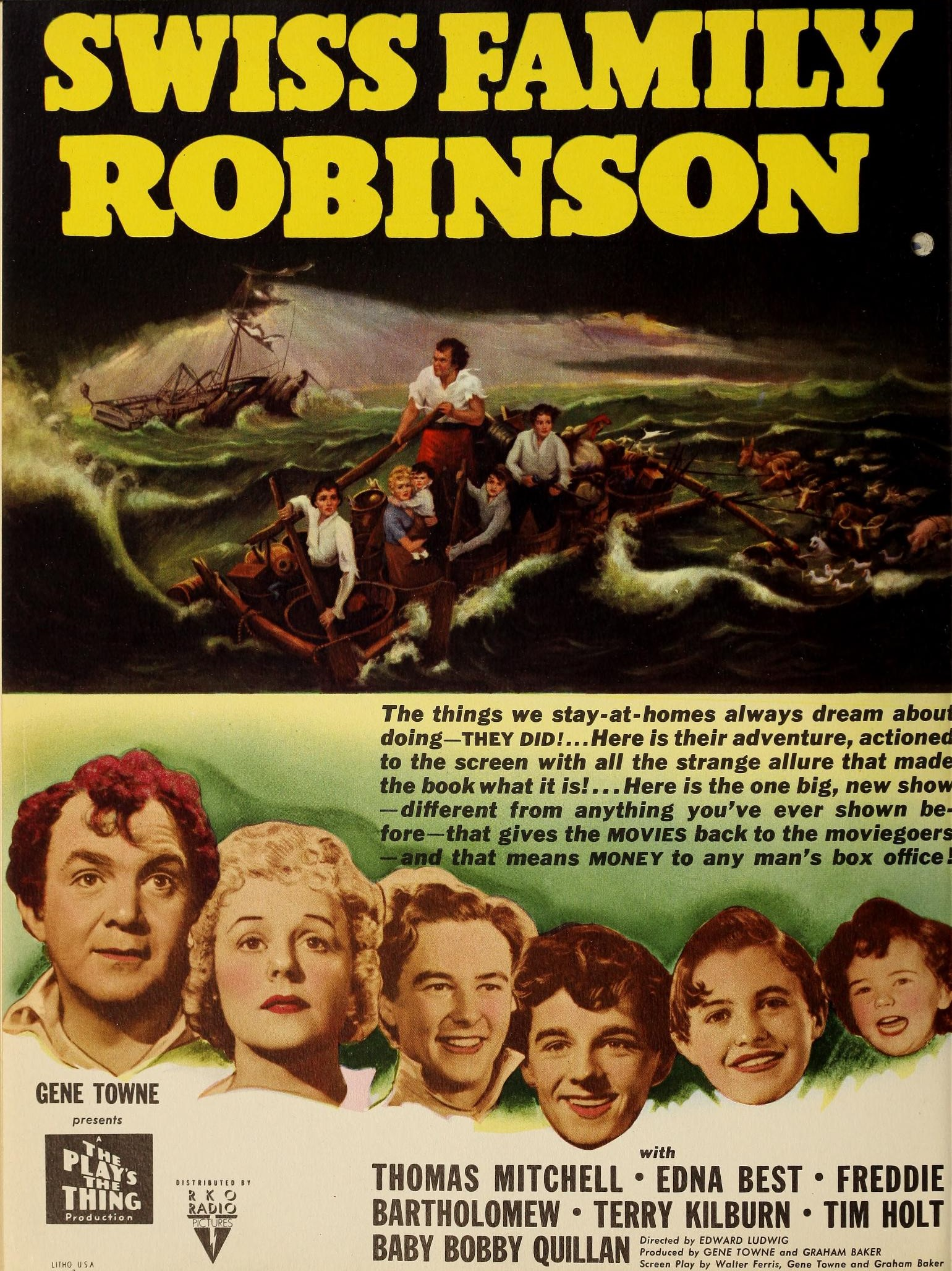
Swiss Family Robinson film 1940 advertisement

Swiss Family Robinson is a 1940 American adventure film released by RKO Radio Pictures and directed by Edward Ludwig. It is based on the 1812 novel The Swiss Family Robinson by Johann David Wyss and is the first feature-length film version of the story.

== Plot ==
In London in 1813, a Swiss father, William Robinson, wishes to escape the influence of the superficial profligacy of London on his family. His eldest son, Fritz, is obsessed with Napoleon, whom he considers his hero. His middle son, Jack, is a foolish dandy who cares only about fashion and money. And his dreamy son Ernest is preoccupied with reading and writing to the exclusion of all else.

William Robinson sells his business and house, in order to move with his wife and four sons to Australia. They set out on a brig bound for the faraway country. Following a long voyage, the family is shipwrecked on a remote deserted island after the captain and crew are washed overboard during a storm.

The family members collaborate to create a home for themselves in the alien jungle environment. They gradually learn to use the unfamiliar plants and animals to create what they need to live and thrive. They have many adventures and challenges and make many discoveries. The mother, however, misses her elegant home and community in England, and wishes to somehow be rescued and return. The father slowly convinces her that living in the natural environment is better for the family and that they are meant to be there. In the end, Fritz and Jack board a ship home while the rest of the family stay on the island.

== Cast ==
- Thomas Mitchell as William Robinson
- Edna Best as Elizabeth Robinson
- Freddie Bartholomew as Jack Robinson
- Terry Kilburn as Ernest Robinson
- Tim Holt as Fritz Robinson
- Bobbie Quillan as Francis Robinson (credited as Baby Bobby Quillan)
- Christian Rub as Thoren
- John Wray as Ramsey
- Herbert Rawlinson as Captain
- Orson Welles as Narrator (uncredited)

== Production notes ==
The producers specialised in making films based on public domain texts.

Tim Holt was the first star assigned. Freddie Bartholomew and Terry Kilburn were borrowed from MGM. This was the first feature-length film with a performance by Orson Welles, who went uncredited as the story's narrator.

A version running 108 minutes (15 minutes longer than the generally available print) is also screened occasionally.

== Critical reception ==
=== Upon release ===
The film was nominated for an Oscar for Best Special Effects (Vernon L. Walker, John O. Aalberg).

Frank Nugent of The New York Times wrote:

When it stays with the book, which was adventure plus instruction, the film is considerably better. The storm sequences—there are three of them—are properly noisy, drenching and spectacular. The salvage trips to the reef-bound brig, the lessons in candlemaking and ostrich-taking, the recipe for Mrs. Robinson's fish stew, some of the family's minor naturalistic adventures are amusingly, and often excitingly, depicted. They and the uniformly competent performance of the cast make it a moderately entertaining, if rather somnolently paced, story-book film.

Variety called it "a good adventure yarn" but suggested that the tropical storm sequences went on too long, and that Edna Best's hairdo seemed "always too perfect" for a believable castaway. Film Daily called it "an appealing picture for the family trade" and "a genuine accomplishment." Harrison's Reports wrote, "Pretty good entertainment ... adapted with imagination and produced with skill." John Mosher of The New Yorker wrote a mixed review, criticizing the change of the character of the mother from resourceful in the book to "fretful" and "discontented" in the film, a mood that "pervades the story and saps the vigor of the adventure element." However, Mosher thought that "Some pleasant domestic animals and a pet or two add variety", and he found the tropical storm "satisfactory."

The movie recorded a loss of $180,000.

=== Contemporary critics ===
Leonard Maltin calls the 93-minute version an "Excellent adaptation of [the] Johann Wyss book", and writes that it "boasts impressive special effects, strong performances, and much darker elements than the Disney film Swiss Family Robinson".

The film is one of Oscar-winning film director James Ivory's favorite movies. Ivory is quoted as saying that he liked the idea of the Robinsons transforming their deserted island with their London furnishings salvaged from their shipwreck, saying, "Swiss Family Robinson … appealed to my boyhood taste for disasters."

== Legacy and home media ==
Johann David Wyss's 1812 novel The Swiss Family Robinson was adapted again for film in 1960 by Walt Disney. Associate producer Basil Keys stated in a December 1960 Saturday Evening Post article that Walt Disney and producer Bill Anderson chose to make their version of the film after viewing the RKO version. According to a July 1959 Los Angeles Times article, director Ken Annakin used the RKO adaptation as "an example of what not to do", that is, avoiding the 1940 film's soundstage reproductions and focusing instead on location shooting and realistic art direction.

Walt Disney is said to have bought the rights to the RKO film in an effort to suppress its re-release and avoid comparisons to his 1960 version. Currently the Walt Disney Co. holds the rights to the RKO version, and 19 minutes of excerpts from the film were included as an extra on the 2002 "Vault Disney Collection" DVD release of their 1960 Swiss Family Robinson.

Although the RKO version has not been released theatrically for decades, and no home formats from Disney were previously made commercially available, the film's 92-minute version was briefly made available on DVD in 2010 from Turner Classic Movies, on their own "Vault Collection" DVD label, a library of "rare and forgotten" films, produced "in only small quantities and available for a limited time." A limited on-demand DVD release by Retro Flix has also been produced.

On October 14, 2019, the Disney+ Twitter account included both the 1940 and 1960 versions of the film amongst a list of the content available on the streaming service at its launch.
