= Edward Lewis (producer) =

American film producer and writer (1919–2019)

- Born: December 16, 1919; Camden, New Jersey, US
- Died: July 27, 2019 (aged 99); Los Angeles, California, US
- Occupations: Film producer, writer
- Years active: 1950s–1984
- Spouse: Mildred Gerchik (m. 1946; died 2019)
- Children: 2

Edward Lewis (December 16, 1919 – July 27, 2019) was an American film producer and writer. As producer, he worked on nine films in partnership with actor Kirk Douglas; from 1958 to 1966, Lewis was Vice-President of Kirk Douglas film production company, Bryna Productions, as well as its subsidiaries, Brynaprod, Joel Productions and Douglas and Lewis Productions. He also produced nine films directed by John Frankenheimer. Lewis also wrote several books.

== Biography ==
Lewis was born in Camden, New Jersey to Max Klein and Florence (Klein) Lewis, on December 16, 1919. Before graduating, Lewis went to Bucknell University, and then to dental school. Before graduating, he served in the United States Army in England as a Captain, at a military hospital. After World War II, he lived in Los Angeles, where he married Mildred Gerchik in 1946; they had two daughters.

Lewis was a financial supporter of Cesar Chavez; he fronted the purchase of an old tuberculosis sanatorium in Keene, along the foothills of the Tehachapi Mountains, for the United Farm Workers.

He died on July 27, 2019 at his home in Los Angeles, California.

== Career ==
In June 1956, Lewis began what would be a ten-year partnership with actor Kirk Douglas and his independent film production company Bryna Productions. That month, Bryna Productions acquired Lewis' original story and screenplay, Mavourneen, a comedy about three girls in an Irish town who conspire to trick the town's most eligible bachelor into marrying one of them. Lewis was appointed Associate Producer for both Mavourneen (which was never made) and Lizzie, a film about a woman with a triple personality complex, in production for Metro-Goldwyn-Mayer and starring Eleanor Parker. Lewis would quickly become a key member for the Bryna Productions organization. In September 1956, Lewis was assigned as producer for Bryna Productions' The Careless Years, a teenage drama co-starring Natalie Trundy and Dean Stockwell. In November 1957, Lewis was appointed head of Bryna Productions' television department, charged with producing and developing the series Tales of the Vikings for United Artists Television.

In late March 1958, Lewis was appointed Vice-President of Bryna Productions, a position he held for the next five years, until he was made an equal partner in the firm Douglas and Lewis Productions in December 1963, holding that position for an additional three years. During this time, he worked on such films as Spartacus, co-starring Douglas, Tony Curtis, Laurence Olivier, Charles Laughton, Peter Ustinov, John Gavin and Jean Simmons; The Last Sunset, co-starring Douglas, Rock Hudson, Joseph Cotten and Dorothy Malone; Lonely Are the Brave, co-starring Douglas and Walter Matthau; The List of Adrian Messenger, co-starring Douglas and George C. Scott; Seven Days in May; co-starring Douglas, Burt Lancaster, Fredric March and Ava Gardner; Seconds, co-starring Hudson and Salome Jens; and Grand Prix, co-starring James Garner, Yves Montand, Eva Marie Saint and Toshiro Mifune. With Spartacus, Lewis contributed to ending the Hollywood blacklist by commissioning Dalton Trumbo to write the screenplay and 'fronting' for him, only revealing the subterfuge to Universal-International when Spartacus was nearly completed. Trumbo is reported to have written of Lewis that he "risked his name to help a man who'd lost his name".

In January 1967, Edward Lewis Productions and John Frankenheimer Productions together signed a four-picture financing and distribution deal with Metro-Goldwyn-Mayer, for the production of several films which the pair had developed during the Douglas and Lewis Productions era. Lewis and Frankenheimer co-produced five additional films together, including The Fixer, The Extraordinary Seaman and The Gypsy Moths, as part of their Metro-Goldwyn-Mayer pact, followed by I Walk the Line and The Horsemen, as part of a subsequent pact with Columbia Pictures.

== Partial film credits ==
- Run for the Hills (1953)
- Spartacus (1960)
- The Last Sunset (1961)
- Lonely Are the Brave (1962)
- The List of Adrian Messenger (1963)
- Seven Days in May (1964)
- Seconds (1966)
- Grand Prix (1966)
- The Fixer (1968)
- The Gypsy Moths (1969)
- The Extraordinary Seaman (1969)
- I Walk the Line (1970)
- The Horsemen (1971)
- Executive Action (1973)
- The Blue Bird (1976)
- Missing (1982) He shared an Academy Award nomination for best picture with his wife, Mildred Lewis.
- Crackers (1984)
- The River (1984)

== Other work ==
=== Drama ===
- 1963 Broadway adaptation of Ken Kesey's novel "One Flew Over the Cuckoo's Nest", co -produced with David Merrick.

=== Television ===
- Executive producer of the series Tales of the Vikings.
- Executive producer of the mini-series The Thorn Birds. The series won an Emmy.

== Books ==
- Brothers (1977), co-authored with Mildred Lewis (fictionalized account of the relationship between black activist Angela Davis and George Jackson, a prison inmate).
- Heads You Lose (2002) co-authored with Mildred Lewis
- Masquerade (2006)
- I am Spartacus! Making a Film, Breaking the Blacklist. (2012)
