= Charles Nolte =

American actor, dramatist, educator (1923–2010)

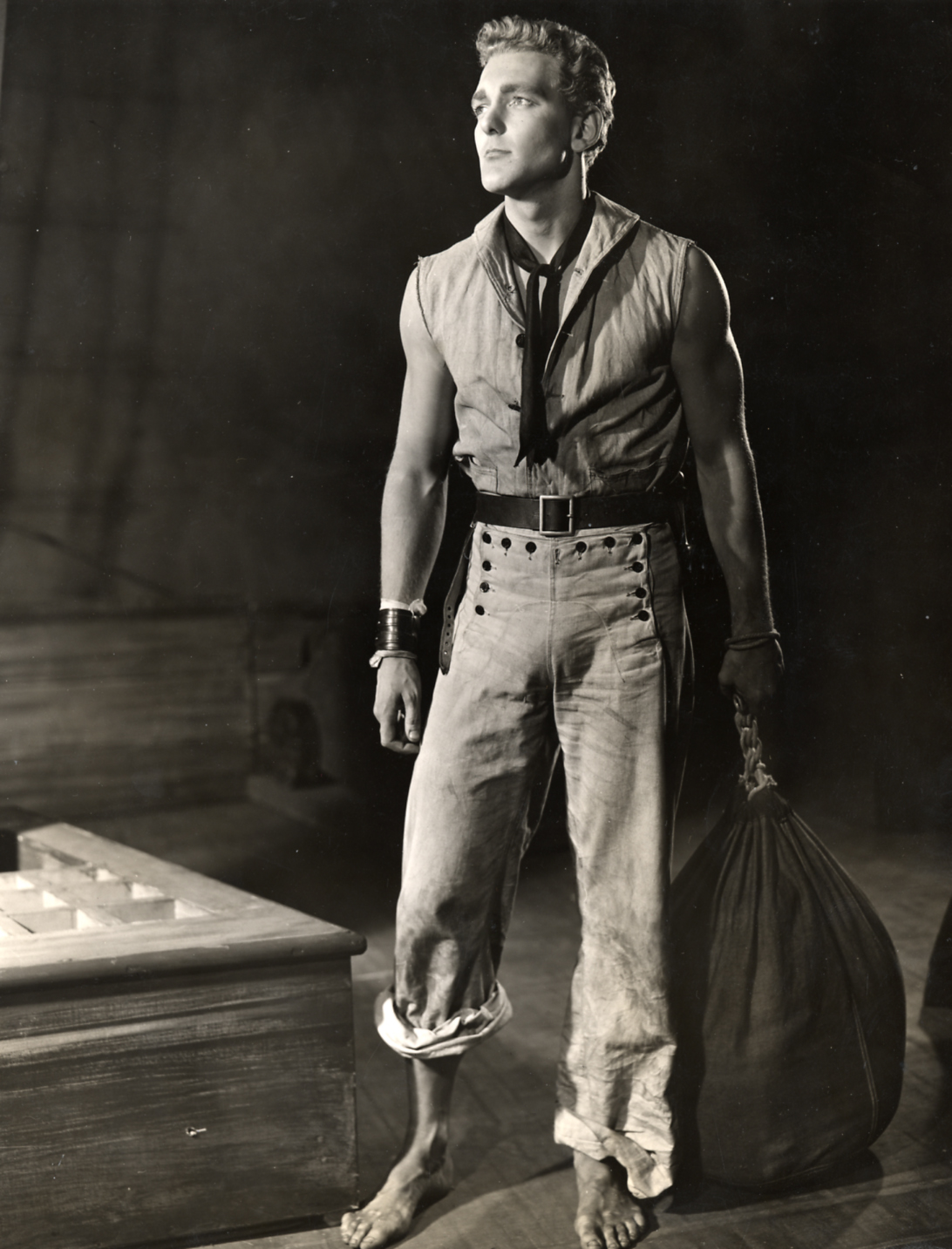
- Nolte as the title character in the 1951 Broadway production of Billy Budd
- Born: November 3, 1923; Duluth, Minnesota, U.S.
- Died: January 14, 2010 (aged 86); Minneapolis, Minnesota, U.S.
- Occupations: Actor, academic, playwright, opera librettist, theatre director
- Years active: 1951–1961
- Partner: Terry Kilburn (1957–2010)

Charles Nolte (November 3, 1923 – January 14, 2010) was an American actor of stage, film and television, theatre director, playwright, and educator.

== Early life, education and career ==
Nolte was born in Duluth, Minnesota, and moved to Wayzata, Minnesota, with his family in the early 1930s. He graduated from Wayzata High School in 1941 and performed in an acting company that later became Old Log Theater.

He studied at the University of Minnesota for two years, then served in the United States Navy from 1943 until 1945. Upon his return, he enrolled at Yale University and majored in English with a minor in history.

He made his Broadway debut in a 1947 production of Shakespeare's Antony and Cleopatra, starring Katharine Cornell and featuring Charlton Heston, Maureen Stapleton and Tony Randall. But it was his role in the 1951 Broadway production of Billy Budd playing the title role that garnered him critical attention and acclaim. He appeared in films, including War Paint (1953), The Steel Cage (1954), Ten Seconds to Hell (1959), and Under Ten Flags (1960).

He returned to the University of Minnesota and earned his doctorate in 1966. He taught at the University of Minnesota from the mid-1960s through the late 1990s.

He wrote the play Do Not Pass Go, which was produced off-Broadway, and wrote the librettos for two operas by Dominick Argento, The Voyage of Edgar Allan Poe and The Dream of Valentino.

== Personal life ==
Nolte's partner of over fifty years was British-American actor and director Terry Kilburn, who is known internationally for his film work as a child actor in the late 1930s and early 1940s. From 1970 to 1994, Kilburn was artistic director of Oakland University's Meadow Brook Theatre in Rochester, Michigan, the largest non-profit professional theater in Michigan and a venue for classic plays, comedies and musicals. It is known for its annual production of Dickens's A Christmas Carol, which was adapted by Nolte.

In 2009, Nolte donated his personal papers, including his journals, manuscripts, personal photographs, lecture notes, playbills, and films (DVDs and videos), to the Jean-Nickolaus Tretter Collection in Gay, Lesbian, Bisexual and Transgender Studies at the University of Minnesota.

Nolte died in January 2010 at the age of 86.

== Filmography ==
Year	Title	Role	Notes
1952	Tales of Tomorrow		Episode "The Tomb of King Tarus"
1953	War Paint	Cpl. Hamilton	
1954	The Steel Cage	Frank - Convict	(segment "The Hostages")
1959	Ten Seconds to Hell	Doctor	Uncredited
1960	Under Ten Flags		Uncredited
1961	Armored Command	Capt. Swain	(final film role)
