= The Cheyenne Social Club =

1970 film by James Lee Barrett

- Original cinema poster
- Directed by: Gene Kelly
- Written by: James Lee Barrett
- Produced by: James Lee Barrett; Gene Kelly
- Starring: James Stewart; Henry Fonda; Shirley Jones; Sue Ane Langdon
- Cinematography: William H. Clothier
- Edited by: Adrienne Fazan
- Music by: Walter Scharf
- Production company: National General Pictures
- Distributed by: National General Pictures
- Release date: June 10, 1970 (Salt Lake City)
- Running time: 103 minutes
- Country: United States
- Language: English
- Box office: $5,250,000 (US/Canada) (rentals)

The Cheyenne Social Club is a 1970 American Western comedy film written by James Lee Barrett, directed and produced by Gene Kelly, and starring James Stewart, Henry Fonda and Shirley Jones. The film is about an aging cowboy who inherits a brothel and decides to turn it into a respectable boarding house, against the wishes of both the townspeople and the ladies working there.

== Plot ==
In 1867, John O'Hanlan (Stewart) and his dear friend and partner of 10 years, Harley Sullivan (Fonda), are aging cowboys working on open cattle ranges in Texas. John receives a letter from an attorney in Cheyenne, Wyoming, stating his recently deceased brother, D.J., left him The Cheyenne Social Club in his will. After traveling 1,000 miles on horseback, from Texas, the pair arrives in Cheyenne. John visits D.J.'s lawyer (Greer) and is also given $1100 in the past month's profits, but discovers the club is a high-class brothel separated from the busy part of town by the railroad tracks.

Despite the money, favor and special treatment from most of the town, John is not keen on running such a sordid operation, so he gives the ladies (termination) notice and subsequently falls into disfavor with both them and Cheyenne's male population.

While visiting the lawyer again, John learns his brother's property deed to the brothel contained a land reverter clause back to the railroad, should the brothel cease operation.

Jenny (Jones), the Club's madam, is beaten by a man named Corey Bannister, whom she previously rebuffed. Enraged and protective, John, a handgun novice, challenges and kills Bannister at a local saloon, when a distracted Bannister mistakes Harley's cracking of nuts for the cocking of a gun. Afterward, John regains popularity. The sheriff, conveniently on his way out of town, warns John that Bannister's relatives are headed to Cheyenne for revenge. Harley decides to return to Texas, but he happens to ride into the Bannisters' camp, where he bums a cup of coffee. When he discovers their identity, Harley doubles back, and he, John and Jenny successfully fight them off.

When the sheriff advises John that even more of the Bannisters' relatives, the Markstones, will soon come to town, and that the sheriff will coincidentally be out of town again, John transfers ownership of the property to Jenny, and he and Harley return to Texas. Back on the range, John receives a letter of thanks from Jenny. He is touched but tosses it into their campfire. Harley is upset that he didn't have a chance to read the letter, and he and John ride off arguing.

== Cast ==
- James Stewart as John O'Hanlan
- Henry Fonda as Harley Sullivan
- Shirley Jones as Jenny
- Sue Ane Langdon as Opal Ann
- Elaine Devry as Pauline
- Jason Wingreen as Dr. Farley Carter
- Jackie Russell as Carrie Virginia
- Jackie Joseph as Annie Jo
- Sharon DeBord as Sara Jean
- Robert Middleton as Barkeep
- J. Pat O'Malley as (bar drunk) Dr. Foy
- Robert J. Wilke as Corey Bannister
- Dabbs Greer as Jedediah W. Willowby
- Charles Tyner as Charlie Bannister
- John Dehner as Clay Carroll (uncredited)

== Production ==
Set in a brothel with suggestive dialogue, this was one of the few off-color films that James Stewart did. He also specifically asked that his friend Fonda be cast; they had most recently worked together two years previously in Firecreek. Stewart and Fonda's first film together had been the comedy On Our Merry Way (1948), and they had also both appeared in How the West Was Won (1962) but had no scenes together despite playing best friends.

The exteriors were shot at two Western film lots near Santa Fe, New Mexico: the Eaves Movie Ranch, which was built for the film, and Bonanza Creek Ranch. The interiors were shot at the Samuel Goldwyn Studios in Hollywood.

A novelisation of the screenplay was written by Phillip Rock.

== Release ==
The film had its world premiere in Salt Lake City on June 10, 1970. It also opened in Provo and Ogden, Utah, and Boise, Idaho, before expanding into Des Moines and Waterloo, Iowa, and Omaha, Nebraska, as well as Montana.

=== Home media ===
The film is currently distributed by Warner Home Video, with a German DVD release in 2019 by 375 Media.

== Reception ==
The Cheyenne Social Club turned a small profit but was poorly received by critics. It didn't receive any notoriety until decades later with numerous cable television broadcasts. Barrett's script earned a 1970 Writers Guild of America nomination for "Best Comedy Written Directly for the Screen", but it lost to Neil Simon's The Out-of-Towners.

In its first five days in 15 theaters in Utah, Idaho, Iowa and Nebraska, it grossed $108,622.

== See also ==
- List of American films of 1970
