= The Gallant One =

The Gallant One is a 1964 film. It was shot in Peru with English-speaking actors. Ron Randell was a co-producer, alongside associate producer, Bruce Friddle. It was written and directed by Aaron Stell, who had edited To Kill a Mockingbird.

== Plot ==
A boy goes to live with his uncle after his father is unjustly imprisoned. The uncle sells the boy's pet burro for drink. The boy finds the burro but he is injured and needs to be put down. The boy finds evidence to clear his father and a priest gives the boy money for another burro.

== Cast ==
- Henry Heller
- Laya Raki
