= Tyrant of the Sea =

1950 film by Lew Landers

- Directed by: Lew Landers
- Written by: Robert Libott; Frank Burt
- Produced by: Sam Katzman
- Starring: Ron Randell; Rhys Williams; Valentine Perkins; Doris Lloyd
- Cinematography: Ira H. Morgan
- Edited by: Edwin Bryant
- Music by: Mischa Bakaleinikoff
- Production company: Columbia Pictures
- Distributed by: Columbia Pictures
- Release date: February 22, 1950
- Running time: 70 minutes
- Country: United States
- Language: English

Tyrant of the Sea is a 1950 American historical war film set during the Napoleonic Wars and starring Ron Randell, Rhys Williams, Valentine Perkins and Doris Lloyd. It was directed by Lew Landers.

== Plot ==
In 1803, Royal Navy Captain Blake is forced into retirement by Admiral Lord Nelson for his harsh treatment of the crew of his ship, HMS Warrior. However, when Napoleon gathers barges for an invasion of England, Nelson and Lieutenant Hawkins devise a risky plan to sneak a ship into the midst of the barges under cover of fog and destroy them, but the plan requires a superb sailor to navigate the shallow waters. Nelson believes that only Blake has the skill required for the mission.

Lieutenant Hawkins is sent to fetch Blake. He obtains directions to Blake's home from an attractive young woman whom he learns is Blake's daughter Betsy. Blake declines the admiralty's request, but his wife Elizabeth convinces Blake to change his mind. Meanwhile, Hawkins accepts a dinner invitation and becomes better acquainted with Betsy.

Nelson orders Blake that his crew must consist solely of volunteers, but Blake sets sail aboard Warrior immediately before giving his men the choice. When asked what would happen to any man who refuses to volunteer, he states that the man would be thrown overboard. Lieutenant Hawkins expresses his disapproval of Blake's behavior.

They sail to the Scheldt, but the weather proves uncooperative. Food runs very low, with rations cut repeatedly, and the crew becomes disgruntled. Daumer suggests sneaking ashore for food, but Hawkins overhears and warns the men against it. However, when a man collapses from the effects of scurvy, Hawkins leads three men ashore, including the Frenchman Daumer. They separate to search for food and Daumer seeks the authorities. When they return to the ship, Blake confines the men for their actions.

In November 1804, a fog appears. Blake releases Hawkins, but Daumer steals a flare, climbs the rigging and ignites the flare before diving overboard. This enables a French ship of the line to locate them and start firing, but Blake sinks the other ship. The crew expects to return to England because they have been discovered. However, Blake intends to proceed with the attack, believing that the French will not anticipate such an action. The crew mutiny, and Sampson Edwards, one of their ringleaders, fires at Blake. Oliver Sibley, Blake's longtime cabin boy, shields his captain at the cost of his own life. Before Edwards can fire again, Hawkins asks to speak to Blake. He proposes that Blake cede command to him, as he might be able to persuade the crew to perform their duty. When Blake refuses, Hawkins fights him, but then the French invasion fleet is sighted. While Blake fires on the barges, Hawkins leads a boarding party onto a French ship, killing Daumer in the process, but he also saves Blake's life. Nelson's fleet arrives to seal the victory.

Despite their success, Blake has both Edwards and Hawkins brought before a court-martial. Edwards is convicted, but Hawkins is sentenced to a mere public censure.

== Cast ==
- Rhys Williams as Captain Blake
- Ron Randell as Lieutenant Hawkins
- Valentine Perkins as Betsy Blake
- Doris Lloyd as Elizabeth Blake
- Lester Matthews as Lord Nelson
- Ross Elliott as Palmer
- Harry Cording as Sampson Edwards
- Terry Kilburn as Dick Savage
- Maurice Marsac as Phillipe Daumer
- William Fawcett as Shawn O'Donnell
- Don C. Harvey as Moriarty
- James Fairfax as Oliver Sibley
- Stanley Andrews as Officer
- Frank Ferguson as Officer
- Percy Helton as Crewman

Randell appeared in the film while also acting on stage in a double bill of Terence Rattigan plays, Harlequinade and The Browning Version.

== Production ==
The film began as a project titled The Return of Captain Bligh and was to star Charles Laughton, who had famously played Captain Bligh in Mutiny on the Bounty (1935). However, Laughton did not wish to repeat his performance, so the script was rewritten to focus on a fictitious character based on Bligh.

Filming began on August 16, 1950.

The sets were designed by art director Paul Palmentola.

== Reception ==
In a contemporary review for the New York Daily News, critic Dorothy Masters wrote: "'Tyrant of the Sea' is for the swashbuckling fanciers—and then only for those not too fancy in their film requirements, since the nautical saga is weak in performances as well as credulity."

Reviewer Philip K. Scheuer of the Los Angeles Times wrote: "Not bad, really, for a low-budget B filler-in".
