= Indian Uprising (film) =

1952 film by Ray Nazarro

- Directed by: Ray Nazarro
- Screenplay by: Kenneth Gamet; Richard Schayer
- Story by: Richard Schayer
- Produced by: Bernard Small
- Starring: George Montgomery; Audrey Long; Carl Benton Reid
- Cinematography: Ellis W. Carter
- Edited by: Richard Fantl
- Music by: Ross DiMaggio
- Production company: Edward Small Productions
- Distributed by: Columbia Pictures
- Release date: January 2, 1952
- Running time: 75 minutes
- Country: United States
- Language: English

Indian Uprising is a 1952 American Western film directed by Ray Nazarro and starring George Montgomery, Audrey Long and Carl Benton Reid.

The film was shot in Supercinecolor and produced by Bernard Small for Edward Small Productions.

== Plot ==
In 1885 in Arizona, U.S. Cavalry captain Case McCloud tries to maintain the treaty between the Apache Indians led by Geronimo and the government that keeps white prospectors off Apache territory. Local Tucson businessmen, including Cliff Taggert, foment trouble, and when new cavalry commander Maj. Nathan Stark arrives, he recalls his troops and allows local prospectors to return to their mines. McCloud tries desperately to prevent a war.

Taggert has an old miner killed in order to implicate the Apaches. McCloud investigates and proves that the arrow that hit the miner was from a different tribe. Nevertheless, Stark captures Geronimo and refuses to follow a treaty. Geronimo will be sent to prison in Florida, but when Case decides to resign from the Army in protest, Geronimo tells Case that Case's sword is honorable, as he fought for the Apaches' rights. Case remains in the Army and marries his schoolteacher girlfriend Norma Clemson, who operates a school for the Apaches.

== Cast ==
- George Montgomery as Capt. Case McCloud
- Audrey Long as Norma Clemson
- Carl Benton Reid as John Clemson
- Eugene Iglesias as Sgt. Ramirez
- John Baer as 2nd. Lt. Whitely
- Joe Sawyer as Sgt. Maj. Phineas T. Keogh
- Robert Shayne as Maj. Nathan Stark
- Robert Foster Dover as Tubai
- Eddie Waller as Sagebrush
- Douglas Kennedy as Cliff Taggert
- Miguel Inclán as Geronimo
- Hugh Sanders as Ben Alsop
- Stanley Blystone as Miner (uncredited)
- Charles Evans as Secretary of War (uncredited)

== See also ==
- List of American films of 1952
