= Bulldog Drummond at Bay (1947 film) =

1947 film by Sidney Salkow

- Directed by: Sidney Salkow
- Screenplay by: Frank Gruber
- Based on: Bulldog Drummond at Bay; 1935 novel by H.C. McNeile
- Produced by: Louis B. Appleton Jr. Bernard Small
- Starring: Anita Louise; Patrick O'Moore; Terry Kilburn; Holmes Herbert; Ron Randell
- Cinematography: Philip Tannura
- Edited by: Aaron Stell
- Production company: Venture Pictures
- Distributed by: Columbia Pictures
- Release date: 15 May 1947
- Running time: 70 minutes
- Country: United States
- Language: English

Bulldog Drummond at Bay is a 1947 American adventure crime mystery film directed by Sidney Salkow and starring Ron Randell for the first time as the British sleuth and adventurer Bulldog Drummond. The cast also includes Anita Louise, Patrick O'Moore and Terry Kilburn.

The film is loosely based on the novel Bulldog Drummond at Bay by H. C. McNeile.

== Plot ==
Bulldog Drummond uncovers a deadly jewel caper involving foreign agents trying to steal plans for a top-secret British aircraft.

== Cast ==
- Ron Randell as Bulldog Drummond
- Anita Louise as Doris Hamilton
- Patrick O'Moore as Algy Longworth
- Terry Kilburn as Seymour
- Holmes Herbert as Inspector McIvar
- Lester Matthews as Shannon
- Leonard Mudie as Meredith

== Production ==
The Bulldog Drummond series had been popular B movies before the war. In June 1946 it was announced Venture Pictures, a Columbia producing unit headed by Lou Appleton and Bernard Small, had done a deal with the estate of H.C. McNeile to make two Bulldog Drummond pictures, with an option to provide six more (the last one had been Bulldog Drummond's Secret Police (1939)). John Howard had played Drummond in the 1930s but it was decided to use a new actor in the part.

In November 1946, it was announced that Drummond would be played by Ron Randell, an Australian actor who was signed to a long-term contract with Columbia off the back of his performance in Smithy. Sidney Salkow would direct with filming to start in December. According to Appleton, "We wanted a new film face and someone with a British way of speaking."

Former child star Terry Kilburn was given an adult role.

== Critical reception ==
The Monthly Film Bulletin called Randell "an attractive personality... a worthy successor as Drummond."

Leonard Maltin called the film an "innocuous British 'quota quickie'".

Filmink wrote "This was an okay film, a little creaky – Randell wasn’t quite comfortable in the lead."
