= List of Rawhide episodes =

Rawhide is an American Western television series which ran from January 9, 1959 until December 7, 1965, with a total of 217 episodes across eight seasons. It aired on CBS in black-and-white and starred Eric Fleming and Clint Eastwood.

== Series overview ==
Season	Episodes	Originally released	
Season	Episodes	First released	Last released
1	23	January 9, 1959	July 10, 1959
2	31	September 18, 1959	June 17, 1960
3	30	September 30, 1960	June 16, 1961
4	29	September 29, 1961	May 11, 1962
5	31	September 21, 1962	May 31, 1963
6	30	September 26, 1963	May 14, 1964
7	30	September 25, 1964	May 21, 1965
8	13	September 14, 1965	December 7, 1965

== Episodes ==
=== Season 1 (1959) ===
No. overall	No. in season	Title	Directed by	Written by	Original release date
1	1	"Incident of the Tumbleweed"	Richard Whorf	Story by : Curtis Kenyon; Teleplay by : Fred Freiberger	January 9, 1959
Gil and Rowdy volunteer to finish the delivery of a prison wagon containing seven dangerous prisoners to Fort Craig for trial.
2	2	"Incident at Alabaster Plain"	Richard Whorf	David Swift	January 16, 1959
Rowdy finds a close friend from the army is getting married, but a visit from the bride's stepbrother causes complications.
3	3	"Incident with an Executioner"	Charles Marquis Warren	James Edmiston	January 23, 1959
The drovers rescue several passengers from a stagecoach that overturns and discover that a gunman known as "The Executioner" is following them with unknown intentions.
4	4	"Incident of the Widowed Dove"	Ted Post	David Lang	January 30, 1959
While partying in a small town, Rowdy attempts to help a woman with a dangerous husband – the town marshal.
5	5	"Incident on the Edge of Madness"	Andrew V. McLaglen	Herbert Little, Jr. & David Victor	February 6, 1959
The drovers are approached by a Colonel looking for men to join his Confederacy of Panama. Gil must act to prevent losing his cowhands.
6	6	"Incident of the Power and the Plow"	Andrew V. McLaglen	Fred Freiberger	February 13, 1959
Gil enters into a dispute between a landowner and Comanche settlers – on the side of the Comanches.
7	7	"Incident at Barker Springs"	Charles Marquis Warren	Les Crutchfield	February 20, 1959
Gil takes on two brothers as cowhands – a retired gunfighter and his masked kid brother who is determined to follow in his footsteps which leads to trouble in the small town of Barker Springs whose residents live in fear of a local rancher (DeForest Kelley) who dominates by killing those who oppose him.
8	8	"Incident West of Lano"	Charles Marquis Warren	Buckley Angell	February 27, 1959
Gil and Rowdy help four stranded women with a broken wagon, allowing them to accompany the trail herd to the next town. On the way, they reach a river crossing and enter into a dispute over who will cross first with some traders approaching from the other side.
9	9	"Incident of the Town in Terror"	Ted Post	Oliver Crawford	March 6, 1959
A suspected case of anthrax affects the trail herd, including Rowdy, preventing Gil from advancing the herd past a town where the residents fear being infected by the killer disease.
10	10	"Incident of the Golden Calf"	Jesse Hibbs	Endre Bohem	March 13, 1959
Gil takes on a wandering preacher who has been run out of a town following a gold strike. Several cowhands become anxious to learn the name of the town to try their fortune there.
11	11	"Incident of the Coyote Weed"	Jesse Hibbs	David Lang	March 20, 1959
The trail herd comes under threat after a dead man is found hanging from a tree branded with a Mexican bandit's initial.
12	12	"Incident of the Chubasco"	Buzz Kulik	Al C. Ward	April 3, 1959
Gil recruits some extra hands to help drive the herd across a difficult plateau only to discover that one of the new men is hiding another man's wife in his wagon. Soon her husband shows up, with 40 men, intent on reclaiming her at any cost.
13	13	"Incident of the Curious Street"	Ted Post	Teleplay by : N.B. Stone Jr. & Earl Baldwin; Story by : N.B. Stone Jr.	April 10, 1959
Gil and Rowdy wander into a deserted mining town only to find a pair of female stagecoach passengers being held hostage by two men.
14	14	"Incident of the Dog Days"	George Sherman	Samuel A. Peeples	April 17, 1959
Gil is determined to drive the trail across a wide stretch of dry plains, leading to low morale and heightened tensions between the cowhands.
15	15	"Incident of the Calico Gun"	Jesse Hibbs	Winston Miller	April 24, 1959
Gil allows a young lady to travel with the drive after the apparent loss of her family, unaware that she is part of an outlaw outfit preparing to steal the next payroll when it is delivered to the drovers.
16	16	"Incident of the Misplaced Indians"	Jesse Hibbs	David Victor & Herbert Little, Jr.	May 1, 1959
Rowdy discovers a house with two dead Delaware Indians lying outside showing no obvious signs of how they died. Indoors, a woman appears to be in shock and unable to speak, so Gil arranges to escort her to a nearby fort.
17	17	"Incident of Fear in the Streets"	Andrew V. McLaglen	Fred Freiberger	May 8, 1959
Gil and Rowdy ride into a town looking for a doctor after a scout, Pete, is injured. They quickly discover that the town's citizens are being held hostage by a man seeking to hang those responsible for the lynching his son.
18	18	"Incident Below the Brazos"	Jack Arnold	Herbert Purdom	May 15, 1959
The trail herd's horses break free and stampede during a lightning storm, killing a farmer. His death prompts a range war between the drovers and local farmers led by Eli Becker (Leslie Nielsen) and Cort Wesley (Martin Landau) set out to exact revenge.
19	19	"Incident of the Dry Drive"	Andrew V. McLaglen	John Dunkel	May 22, 1959
A disgruntled old rancher and ex-trail boss refuses to let Gil water his thirsty cattle on his land, knowing they will die of thirst before they reach a suitable source of water to supply the full herd.
20	20	"Incident of the Judas Trap"	Jesse Hibbs	David Lang	June 5, 1959
When wolves start attacking the herd, Gil needs the help of an unpleasant wolfer.
21	21	"Incident in No Man's Land"	Jack Arnold	Story by : Lawrence L. Goldman; Teleplay by : Buckley Angell	June 12, 1959
When explosions start unsettling the herd, Gil and Rowdy investigate the source. They soon discover a quarry being worked by chain gangs.
22	22	"Incident of a Burst of Evil"	George Sherman	Buckley Angell	June 26, 1959
After finding a wild-looking man following the cattle drive, the drovers learn that a band of Comancheros plan on attacking the herd.
23	23	"Incident of the Roman Candles"	Stuart Heisler	Jan Winters	July 10, 1959
Pete and Jim find David Colby shooting Roman candles by the trail. He says he is trying to scare away the Indians that killed his folks and burned them out. He is headed to Eberley to find his uncle but Favor suspects something different.

=== Season 2 (1959–60) ===
No. overall	No. in season	Title	Directed by	Written by	Original release date	Prod. code
24	1	"Incident of the Day of the Dead"	Stuart Heisler	David Victor & Herbert Little Jr.	September 18, 1959	169-3317
Rowdy is blackmailed into attempting to ride a horse after being seen managing a runaway, as the workers revolt from a mysterious rancho.
25	2	"Incident at Dangerfield Dip"	Robert D. Webb	Story by : Herbert Purdum; Teleplay by : Fred Freiberger	October 2, 1959	169-3320
When the herd is forcibly infected with Texas fever, Gil must keep from being blackmailed into treatment for them.
26	3	"Incident of the Shambling Man"	Andrew V. McLaglen	Story by : Charles Larson; Teleplay by : Charles Larson & Fred Freiberger	October 9, 1959	169-3321
The drovers run across an elderly man (Victor McLaglen in his final role) who experiences flashbacks to his days as a boxer that make him uncontrollably violent.
27	4	"Incident at Jacob's Well"	Jack Arnold	Robert Sherman	October 16, 1959	169-3322
The drovers come across a small farming settlement suffering from a severe water shortage.
28	5	"Incident of the 13th Man"	Jesse Hibbs	Story by : Endre Bohem; Teleplay by : Fred Freiberger	October 23, 1959	169-3317
Rowdy and Wishbone are pressured into jury duty while looking for a dentist in a town.
29	6	"Incident at the Buffalo Smokehouse"	Stuart Heisler	Story by : Joseph Vogel; Teleplay by : Louis Vittes	October 30, 1959	169-3319
In order to secure an escape from prairie fire, Gil must defend a smokehouse and its owner.
30	7	"Incident of the Haunted Hills"	Jesse Hibbs	Story by : Oliver Crawford; Teleplay by : Louis Vittes	November 6, 1959	169-3318TV
The only water available to Gil's outfit can only be procured by negotiating with the unfriendly Paneequah.
31	8	"Incident of the Stalking Death"	Harmon Jones	Story by : Oliver Crawford & Louis Vittes; Teleplay by : Louis Vittes	November 13, 1959	169-3321
Gil's best efforts to catch a dangerous puma lead to helping a woman whose son the puma has killed.
32	9	"Incident of the Valley in Shadow"	Harmon Jones	Buckley Angell	November 20, 1959	169-3325
Encounters with Cheyenne lead to Gil finding a captured girl, who must decide whether she will return to American culture.
33	10	"Incident of the Blue Fire"	Charles Marquis Warren	John Dunkel	December 11, 1959	169-3322
The drovers battle the weather, superstition, and interference to keep the herd safe when an unlucky stranger joins the outfit.
34	11	"Incident at Spanish Rock"	Harmon Jones	Story by : Clair Huffaker; Teleplay by : Louis Vittes	December 18, 1959	169-3329
One of Gil's drovers is tortured by men looking for a Mexican revolutionary, until those in power change their minds about their loyalty to the man's enemies.
35	12	"Incident of the Druid Curse"	Jesse Hibbs	Story by : Alva Hudson; Teleplay by : Louis Vittes	January 8, 1960	169-3326
The drovers meet a father and daughter searching the Texan prairie for signs that a druid civilization once lived there.
36	13	"Incident at Red River Station"	Gene Fowler Jr.	Charles Larson	January 15, 1960	169-3328
After finding a dead man, Gil and Rowdy go in search of a doctor, fearing that they have caught smallpox.
37	14	"Incident of the Devil and His Due"	Harmon Jones	Samuel Newman & Louis Vittes	January 22, 1960	169-3323
Accused of a murder, Gil aims to prove his innocence.
38	15	"Incident of the Wanted Painter"	Harmon Jones	Charles Larson	January 29, 1960	169-3331
When a painter is found wounded on the prairie, a painting of a town called Lampton where a man is due to be hanged becomes a much-wanted item.
39	16	"Incident of the Tinker's Dam"	Gene Fowler Jr.	Jan Winters	February 5, 1960	169-3330
Wishbone's storied brother pays the outfit a visit and lives up to his reputation.
40	17	"Incident of the Night Horse"	Joseph Kane	John Dunkel	February 19, 1960	169-3322
An old acquaintance demands Gil's help to capture a mustang before the herd will be allowed through a pass.
41	18	"Incident of the Sharpshooter"	Jesse Hibbs	Winston Miller	February 26, 1960	169-3333
Gil must save Rowdy when he is framed for robbery and murder.
42	19	"Incident of the Dust Flower"	Ted Post	Winston Miller	March 4, 1960	169-3335
The drovers meet an old Irishman and his daughter, and Pete helps her secure the future she has dreamed of.
43	20	"Incident at Sulphur Creek"	Harmon Jones	Story by : Sloan Nibley; Teleplay by : Louis Vittes	March 11, 1960	169-3334
The drovers find a pair of competing brothers are responsible for the loss of the remuda and some horses belonging to the Comanches.
44	21	"Incident of the Champagne Bottles"	Joseph Kane	Story by : Curtis Kenyon; Teleplay by : Louis Vittes	March 18, 1960	169-3336
Gil and Rowdy are impressed by some criminals into carrying their very fragile cargo.
45	22	"Incident of the Stargazer"	Harmon Jones	Story by : Ted Gardner & Jan Winters; Teleplay by : Louis Vittes	April 1, 1960	169-3337
Trail scout Pete, escorts a woman home where she believes the man claiming to be her husband is an impostor.
46	23	"Incident of the Dancing Death"	William F. Claxton	Story by : Dallas Gaultois & James Edmiston; Teleplay by : Buckley Angell	April 8, 1960	169-3324
The drovers experience trouble when gypsies visit their camp.
47	24	"Incident of the Arana Sacar"	Joseph Kane	Story by : Charles Marquis Warren; Teleplay by : Buckley Angell	April 22, 1960	169-3338
When some cattle skinners use the features of the natural landscape to steal the herd, Gil responds in kind.
48	25	"Incident of the Deserter"	Gerd Oswald	Story by : Buckley Angell & Jessica Benson & Louis Vittes; Teleplay by : Louis Vittes	April 29, 1960	169-3339
Suffering with a bad back, Wishbone arrives in a mining town to recuperate. There he finds reasons to consider leaving the trail drive and settle down for good.
49	26	"Incident of the 100 Amulets"	Stuart Heisler	Story by : Fred Freiberger & Lawrence Menkin; Teleplay by : Fred Freiberger & Louis Vittes	May 6, 1960	169-3327
Trail wrangler Hey Soos goes to visit his mother, but he gets a violent reception and claims that his mother is a witch who has cursed the town.
50	27	"Incident of the Murder Steer"	Joseph Kane	John Dunkel	May 13, 1960	169-3340
When a cowhand shows up dead near a steer branded "Murder", recruited from a town where three men have also been killed, the drovers begin to worry.
51	28	"Incident of the Music Maker"	R.G. Springsteen	Story by : Hendrik Vollaerts; Teleplay by : Charles Larson	May 20, 1960	169-3341
A German colony works on the drovers' pity to steal 50 steers, but the patriarch of the colony sides with Gil after he is hurt helping them.
52	29	"Incident of the Silent Web"	Joseph Kane	Winston Miller & Charles B. Smith	June 3, 1960	169-3342
Two convicts on the run, two murders on the prairie, and a young girl who is unable to speak lead the drovers into a confusing set of events.
53	30	"Incident of the Last Chance"	Ted Post	Winston Miller	June 10, 1960	169-3343
A young couple learns to understand each other better after a stint traveling with the outfit.
54	31	"Incident in the Garden of Eden"	Joseph Kane	Story by : Irwin Gielgud & Gwen Bagni and Louis Vittes; Teleplay by : Louis Vittes	June 17, 1960	169-3343
Rowdy attempts to buy 150 head of cattle from an English family to top up the trail herd, but the transaction proves to be less than ideal.

=== Season 3 (1960–61) ===
No. overall	No. in season	Title	Directed by	Written by	Original release date	Prod. code
55	1	"Incident at Rojo Canyon"	Ted Post	Budd Bankson & Steve Raines	September 30, 1960	169-TV 3353
Unaware that the Civil War has ended, a group of Confederate soldiers prepares to stop the trail herd advancing through territory they were ordered to hold.
56	2	"Incident of the Challenge"	Charles Marquis Warren	Story by : Charles Marquis Warren; Teleplay by : Charles Larson	October 14, 1960	169-3345 TV
Gil's search for water and a Mexican's search for a princess coincide to produce strange results.
57	3	"Incident at Dragoon Crossing"	Ted Post	John Dunkel	October 21, 1960	169-3347 TV
The drovers must determine whether to follow another trail boss who says Gil asked him to take over.
58	4	"Incident of the Night Visitor"	R.G. Springsteen	John Dunkel	November 4, 1960	169-3348 TV
A young boy sneaks into camp one night in search of his father that he knows has the initials "G.F.".
59	5	"Incident of the Slavemaster"	Ted Post	Story by : Clayton Fox; Teleplay by : Louis Vittes	November 11, 1960	169-3349 TV
When the drovers learn that a plantation owner is using former Union prisoners as slaves, a rescue plan is required.
60	6	"Incident on the Road to Yesterday"	R.G. Springsteen	Jan Winters & Winston Miller	November 18, 1960	169-3350 TV
An ex-outlaw trying to repay those he robbed 10 years ago returns to his home town to turn himself into the law only to find he is accused of murder.
61	7	"Incident at Superstition Prairie"	Stuart Heisler	Wilton Schiller	December 2, 1960	169-TV-3352
Wishbone violates Comanche custom when he rescues a dying man.
62	8	"Incident at Poco Tiempo"	Ted Post	Buckley Angell	December 9, 1960	169-TV-3351
Rowdy and Quince must find out why they were accused of murder, as well as who would shoot up a Catholic church and send nuns on the stagecoach.
63	9	"Incident of the Captive"	Stuart Heisler	Ted Gardner	December 16, 1960	169-TV-3355
Mushy's mother comes to take him home with her, but the cattle outfit conspires to keep him, and circumstances assist.
64	10	"Incident of the Buffalo Soldier"	Ted Post	John Dunkel	January 6, 1961	169-TV-3358
A horse belonging to the outfit is stolen by a soldier, and he and Rowdy must work together to stay alive.
65	11	"Incident of the Broken Word"	R.G. Springsteen	Louis Vittes	January 20, 1961	169-TV-3361
One of Gil's drovers is sent to a ranch where a former flame is now married, and must overcome his past to save her in the present.
66	12	"Incident at the Top of the World"	Ted Post	Story by : Peggy & Lou Shaw; Teleplay by : Louis Vitties and Peggy & Lou Shaw	January 27, 1961	169-TV-3365
As the trail herd races fast to stay ahead of a Texas Norther, Gil recruits a convalescent civil war veteran as a drover though not without risks.
67	13	"Incident Near the Promised Land"	Ted Post	Story by : Wilton Schiller; Teleplay by : John Dunkel	February 3, 1961	169-TV-3369
Arriving in Sedalia, Missouri, the drovers must prevail with an economic panic and a bitter woman to complete the cattle drive.
68	14	"Incident of the Big Blowout"	George Templeton	John Dunkel	February 10, 1961	169-TV-3370
Gil's outfit considers disbanding in Sedalia after disappointment and celebration, but the men decide to hang together when a mystery surrounding a former member of the team leads to Rowdy's possible lynching.
69	15	"Incident of the Fish out of Water"	Ted Post	Albert Aley	February 17, 1961	169-TV-3371
During Gil's visit to Philadelphia, clashes between the east and the Wild West bring difficulties with each side to light.
70	16	"Incident on the Road Back"	George Templeton	Louis Vittes	February 24, 1961	169-TV-3367
On the way back to Texas to pay cattle owners, Gil is accused of stealing a horse.
71	17	"Incident of the New Start"	Jus Addiss	Story by : Endre Bohem; Teleplay by : Charles Larson	March 3, 1961	169-TV-3372
After accepting a new herd to drive, Gil is forced to assume the role of ramrod when a cattle owner insists of being trail boss.
72	18	"Incident of the Running Iron"	Harmon Jones	John Dunkel	March 10, 1961	169-3346 TV
When Quince is accused of rebranding cattle and sentenced to hang, Gil must investigate to uncover the true rustlers.
73	19	"Incident Near Gloomy River"	R.G. Springsteen	John Dunkel	March 17, 1961	169-TV 3355
Rowdy and another drover ends up at the latter's family home looking for water, and enlist the drovers to build a new home and uncover a mystery.
74	20	"Incident of the Boomerang"	Allen Reisner	Story by : Michael Pate; Teleplay by : Charles Larson	March 24, 1961	169-TV-3359
An Australian rancher and his hand team up with the drovers to safely pass through Comanche territory.
75	21	"Incident of His Brother's Keeper"	Ted Post	Buckley Angell	March 31, 1961	169-TV-3360
While waiting for a telegraph, Nolan is asked to escort a crippled man's wife to a dance where things become complicated.
76	22	"Incident in the Middle of Nowhere"	R.G. Springsteen	Story by : Howard Rigsby & Louis Vittes; Teleplay by : Louis Vittes	April 7, 1961	169-TV-3357
Gil and Rowdy lend their help to preserve the enterprise of a reclusive man in the mountains.
77	23	"Incident of the Phantom Bugler"	George Templeton	Story by : Buckley Angell & Louis Vittes; Teleplay by : Louis Vittes	April 14, 1961	169-TV-3368
When a Judge and his son-in-law demand a toll for the herd to cross a river, Gil discovers a set of family conflicts.
78	24	"Incident of the Lost Idol"	Ted Post	Albert Aley	April 28, 1961	169-TV-3362
The drovers meet a brother and sister with a sick mother, but soon learn their father is a fugitive with a price on his head.
79	25	"Incident of the Running Man"	Justus Addiss	David Lang	May 5, 1961	169-TV-3364
Rowdy is hunted by army impersonators and must warn a nearby fort of their plot before the soldiers are all killed.
80	26	"Incident of the Painted Lady"	Harmon Jones	John Dunkel	May 12, 1961	169-TV-3363
Gil goes in search of a trail boss who stole $15,000 from some Missouri ranchers who are demanding repayment of the debt from his herd.
81	27	"Incident Before Black Pass"	Ted Post	Story by : Arthur Rowe & Don Moore; Teleplay by : Arthur Rowe & Don Moore and Louis Vittes	May 19, 1961	169-TV-3354
The drovers must help Kiowa chief White Eyes back to where whites live before he dies in order to rescue Rowdy and Pete from the Kiowa.
82	28	"Incident of the Blackstorms"	R.G. Springsteen	Story by : Sheb Wooley (story), Tony Habeeb; Teleplay by : Jan Winters	May 26, 1961	169-TV-3366
Nolan and Mushy are drawn into helping an outlaw meet his son and reclaim his former life.
83	29	"Incident of the Night on the Town"	Anton Leader	Story by : Chris Miller & Eric Fleming; Teleplay by : Louis Vittes	June 2, 1961	3002
Gil receives a lawsuit, accused of herding 750 cattle which were stolen by the rancher he drives them for.
84	30	"Incident of the Wager on Payday"	R.G. Springsteen	Louis Vittes	June 16, 1961	3003
Rowdy goes after two outlaws who steal the cashbox from the drover's chuck wagon, but with no other witnesses he appears to be the thief.

=== Season 4 (1961–62) ===
No. overall	No. in season	Title	Directed by	Written by	Original release date	Prod. code
85	1	"Rio Salado"	Ted Post	John Dunkel	September 29, 1961	3005
The drovers lose their herd when Rowdy meets a local bandit, and his own estranged father, who is looking for the reward promised by turning the bandit in.
86	2	"The Sendoff"	George B. Templeton	John Dunkel	October 6, 1961	3007
Before the team can start their new drive, a fugitive wagonmaster is hunted by the mother of a deceased member of his train. When the dead man's partner mistakes Gil for the master, the different parties prove what they're made of.
87	3	"The Long Shakedown"	Justus Addiss	Albert Aley	October 13, 1961	3008
Gil's traditional seasoning tactics for the herd and the team start to fail him, and he worries that his men are too old. When his green replacement hands let a stampede get the best of them, Gil is left wondering if he's out of business.
88	4	"Judgement at Hondo Seco"	Perry Lafferty	Story by : John Dunkel & Louis Vittes; Teleplay by : Louis Vittes	October 20, 1961	3015
Quince answers a letter for help from his niece, and is sentenced to hang by his own brother.
89	5	"The Lost Tribe"	George B. Templeton	John Dunkel	October 27, 1961	3004
A Cheyenne chief proves to be Pete Nolan's father-in-law, and the drovers change loyalties to take the Cheyenne safely to Mexico.
90	6	"The Inside Man"	George B. Templeton	Albert Aley	November 3, 1961	3009
Two strangers join the drovers and help each other decide which decision they really want to make.
91	7	"The Black Sheep"	Tony Leader	Story by : Jack Curtis; Teleplay by : Charles Larson	November 10, 1961	3012
Rowdy's temper threatens to start a war between the drovers and an outfit of sheepherders, but he is the perfect person to end it too.
92	8	"The Prairie Elephant"	Robert L. Friend	Story by : Walter Wagner & Louis Vittes; Teleplay by : Louis Vittes	November 17, 1961	3006
A circus impedes the herd's progress, and Wishbone is dispatched to move the feuding performers out of the way.
93	9	"The Little Fishes"	Justus Addiss	Charles Larson	November 24, 1961	3010
Gil tries to push the herd more than twice as hard due to bad news he has received, but is held back by his men's interest in a species of fish making its way to California.
94	10	"The Blue Spy"	Sobey Martin	Story by : Warren Douglas; Teleplay by : Tom Seller	December 8, 1961	3016
When an old enemy riles some of the men, a war against old scores and the desert lead to a life or death wager by Gil.
95	11	"The Gentleman's Gentleman"	Sobey Martin	J.E. Selby	December 15, 1961	3013
A stranded English valet who wants to be useful comes in handy when the drovers must convince a town to crack down on some buffalo hunters.
96	12	"Twenty-Five Santa Clauses"	Robert L. Friend	Charles Larson	December 22, 1961	3022
In Gil's absence, the drovers get caught up with a conniving couple, but their plans change when a doctor reveals some serious news.
97	13	"The Long Count"	Jesse Hibbs	Albert Aley	January 5, 1962	3014
The drovers run into a former member of the team, who's become a marshal with the job of taking the census. Rowdy, Pete and Wishbone are drafted to help count people and animals on a ranch where the owner is hiding something.
98	14	"The Captain's Wife"	Tay Garnett	John Dunkel	January 12, 1962	3019
A world-weary captain's wife stationed at a prairie fort goes rogue and casualties ensue. Gil and his men must defend the fort in the absence of the soldiery and eliminate the threat she causes.
99	15	"The Peddler"	Laslo Benedek	Charles Larson	January 19, 1962	3017
When a ne'er-do-well peddler joins the drovers and does his best for them, his luck turns at last.
100	16	"The Woman Trap"	George B. Templeton	Buckley Angell	January 26, 1962	3011
A deceptive land owner in West Texas fools women into becoming mail-order brides for his men, and the women and Gil's drovers must save their own lives when they refuse to follow him any farther.
101	17	"The Boss's Daughter"	Sobey Martin	Albert Aley	February 2, 1962	3018
Gil's sister-in-law and daughters meet a ranch owner en route to visiting the drovers. Gil and the owner rendezvous, where each man wants something from the land and the girls.
102	18	"The Deserter's Patrol"	Andrew V. McLaglen	Louis Vittes	February 9, 1962	3020
Gil and Pete are drawn into a battle of survival four layers deep, and with Pawnee chief Ogalla dead, they must keep a poorly-defended fort from being destroyed.
103	19	"The Greedy Town"	Murray Golden	Story by : Lew Lantz; Teleplay by : Tom Seller	February 16, 1962	3023
Clay Forrester finds himself back in a town where he was previously responsible for a criminal's death. This time he must decide on which side of the law he belongs.
104	20	"Grandma's Money"	Sobey Martin	Story by : Sonia Chernus; Teleplay by : J.E. Selby	February 23, 1962	3021
Rowdy gets mixed up with a worldly-wise woman who's a little older.
105	21	"The Pitchwagon"	Sobey Martin	Story by : Wilton Schiller; Teleplay by : Lou Morheim & Wilton Schiller	March 2, 1962	3024
The drovers meet a patent medicine man who wants to reconcile with his wife, and cook up a far-fetched scheme to raise money for the family of a deceased member of the outfit.
106	22	"The Hostage Child"	Harmon Jones	Bronson Howitzer	March 9, 1962	3028
A Tonkawa mother who has married the U.S. colonel at a Texas fort attempts to use her biracial son as a hostage to get help for her tribe.
107	23	"The Immigrants"	Tay Garnett	Elliott Arnold	March 16, 1962	3033
The drovers are impressed by an exiled German military officer, and teach the servants in his colony to think like free Americans.
108	24	"The Child-Woman"	Murray Golden	Story by : Carey Wilbur; Teleplay by : Elliott Arnold	March 23, 1962	3029
Mushy's mother's order to find his cousins and send them home to her leads to a brawl between Gil, a teenage girl, and a local saloon owner.
109	25	"A Woman's Place"	Justus Addiss	Eric Fleming & Chris Miller	March 30, 1962	3027
When one of the drovers is injured, only a female doctor is available to treat him. Her presence in town is suspicious to some of the citizens, and she and the drovers must reveal what those citizens are up to.
110	26	"Reunion"	Sobey Martin	Elliott Arnold	April 6, 1962	3030
Pete reunites with the outfit, and two fathers on opposing sides of an Indian war reunite with their own sons, with tragic results.
111	27	"House of the Hunter"	Tay Garnett	Louis Vittes	April 20, 1962	3025
Rowdy is kidnapped along with many others who knew the son of a vindinctive man. Costars James Murdock, Steve Raines, Rocky Shahan, Robert Cabal, Robert F. Simon, Rosemary DeCamp, Paula Raymond, Lester Matthews, Peter Adams, Lane Bradford, Harry Shannon and Hal Jon Norman
112	28	"Gold Fever"	James P. Yarbrough	Story by : Sid Harris; Teleplay by : J.E. Selby	May 4, 1962	3026
A bankrupt miner with a family of daughters lures drovers to his claim to get husbands for them.
113	29	"The Devil and the Deep Blue"	George B. Templeton	Story by : Endre Bohem; Teleplay by : Louis Vittes	May 11, 1962	3031
When a drover leading a herd near Gil's dies, Gil takes charge of both herds, and must face the bitterness and resignation of all his men.

=== Season 5 (1962–63) ===
No. overall	No. in season	Title	Directed by	Written by	Original release date	Prod. code
114	1	"Incident of El Toro"	Thomas Carr	Charles Larson	September 21, 1962	8502
115	2	"Incident of the Hunter"	Thomas Carr	Story by : D.D. Beauchamp; Teleplay by : Charles Larson	September 28, 1962	8506
Gil saves a bounty hunter who comes after him.
116	3	"Incident of the Portrait"	Ted Post	William Blinn & Michael Gleason	October 5, 1962	8503
A man who accidentally killed a farmer joins the drovers and must escort the farmer's daughter.
117	4	"Incident at Cactus Wells"	Christian Nyby	Albert Aley	October 12, 1962	8505
An outlaw hunting his wife's lover joins the drovers and causes trouble.
118	5	"Incident of the Prodigal Son"	Christian Nyby	Richard Fielder	October 19, 1962	8507
The drovers take on a testy young man, and he is convinced to drop the chip on his shoulder by a pal in the outfit who has one as well.
119	6	"Incident of the Four Horsemen"	Thomas Carr	Charles Larson	October 26, 1962	8508
After Gil and Clay witness a marriage and a killing between feuding families, Gil tries to push the herd across their disputed land before more trouble comes. When it proves impossible, Gil wrangles peace between sides.
120	7	"Incident of the Lost Woman"	Thomas Carr	Ward Hawkins	November 2, 1962	8504
The drovers defend a widow (Fay Spain) who is escaping her husband's family. Stars R. G. Armstrong, Dean Stanton, Hampton Fancher, and Roy Engel.
121	8	"Incident of the Dogfaces"	Don McDougall	Gene L. Coon	November 9, 1962	8509
The drovers encourage some former Yankee soldiers to face up to the Comanche, in order to free a captive woman and her son.
122	9	"Incident of the Wolvers"	Thomas Cass	William L. Stuart	November 16, 1962	8510
Rowdy hires an abusive man and his three children to kill the wolves that are attacking the herd, and must help them stand up to him.
123	10	"Incident at Sugar Creek"	Christian Nyby	Fred Freiberger	November 23, 1962	8511
A hand working with the drovers angered his wife's father in years past, and when he is injured and the drovers must seek a doctor for him in the town where the father-in-law lives, no one will help.
124	11	"Incident of the Reluctant Bridegroom"	Don McDougall	Story by : Tom Seller & William Driskill; Teleplay by : Winston Miller	November 30, 1962	8512
Rowdy must find a way out when an outlaw pretending to be a preacher marries him to a disgruntled girl.
125	12	"Incident of the Querencias"	Thomas Carr	Joseph Petracca	December 7, 1962	8513
A down-and-out former boss of Gil's joins the herd with his querencia cattle, and causes havoc with the drive.
126	13	"Incident at Quivira"	Christian Nyby	Ralphael Hayes	December 14, 1962	8514
Mushy is led away by tales of gold from an old prospector. When Rowdy goes after them, the three of them stumble onto army deserters who intend to keep the runaways in their hideout permanently to ensure their silence.
127	14	"Incident of Decision"	Don McDougall	John Dunkel	December 28, 1962	8501
When Rowdy and Quince buy some cattle from a farmer, his son insists on joining them as a hand, but he is captured by a bandit and learns some hard truths.
128	15	"Incident of the Buryin' Man"	Thomas Carr	Jack Turley	January 4, 1963	8515
A man pretending to be an undertaker attaches himself to the drovers, leaving Gil at his wits' end, until Indians present him with an apt opportunity to offload the buryin' man.
129	16	"Incident of the Trail's End"	Don McDougall	Ed Adamson	January 11, 1963	8516
A former trail boss of Gil's rides drag and takes disrespect from the drovers, until his knowledge of the trail gives him a high point on which to retire.
130	17	"Incident at Spider Rock"	Thomas Carr	Al C. Ward	January 18, 1963	8517
An heiress who ran from home ends up in the drover's camp and everyone learns to see each other differently.
131	18	"Incident of the Mountain Man"	Don McDougall	Richard Fielder	January 25, 1963	8518
Rowdy ends up escorting a mountain man and his daughter to a marshal, but the trio doesn't reach their destination.
132	19	"Incident at Crooked Hat"	Don McDougall	Joseph Petracca	February 1, 1963	8520
Gil stands between a gunfighter he hired and the man's old feuds.
133	20	"Incident of Judgment Day"	Thomas Carr	Story by : Richard Landau; Teleplay by : Paul King & Richard Landau	February 8, 1963	8519
Rowdy is tracked down by former Yankee prisoners who are determined to hang him.
134	21	"Incident of the Gallows Tree"	Christian Nyby	Story by : William L. Stuart; Teleplay by : Albert Aley	February 22, 1963	8521
Quince is in the wrong place at the wrong time, and to save him Gil must find out who has killed a prominent citizen.
135	22	"Incident of the Married Widow"	Thomas Carr	Story by : Charles Gray & Kathleen Freeman; Teleplay by : Paul King	March 1, 1963	8523
Gil must find a way to clear his own name and that of the woman who's been claiming he's her husband.
136	23	"Incident of the Pale Rider"	Christian Nyby	Dean Riesner	March 15, 1963	8522
Gil hires a man that looks like someone Rowdy shot, and Rowdy fears for his life.
137	24	"Incident of the Comanchero"	Thomas Carr	Al C. Ward	March 22, 1963	8525
A Comanchero who has been left for dead is picked up by two nursing nuns, and Rowdy meets them all and attempts to help.
138	25	"Incident of the Clown"	Don McDougall	Charles Larson	March 29, 1963	8524
The outfit makes it safely through Comanche territory by taking along a man who speaks Indian languages and has another helpful trick in his bag.
139	26	"Incident of the Black Ace"	Thomas Carr	Dean Riesner	April 12, 1963	8527
Wishbone feels sorry for himself until a gypsy convinces him he's about to die. Gil uses Wishbone's sudden kindness to the drovers to garner more appreciation for him as they confront a man claiming the gypsy's daughter in marriage.
140	27	"Incident of the Hostages"	Don McDougall	Story by : Paul King; Teleplay by : Charles Larson	April 19, 1963	8528
The drovers return a family of white children who were taken in by Apaches after Arapahos capture them and barter them to the outfit.
141	28	"Incident of White Eyes"	Christian Nyby	Story by : Paul King; Teleplay by : Edward J. Lakso & Shimon Wincelberg	May 3, 1963	8526
Gil meets a stagecoach carrying a man the Apaches want, and must save the travelers until the man will give himself up.
142	29	"Incident at Rio Doloroso"	Thomas Carr	Paul King	May 10, 1963	8529
When the drovers cross land that is claimed by a Mexican family, the chief's daughter insists on truth being told, which leads to Gil's and Rowdy's rescue from execution and the clan's workers claiming their freedom.
143	30	"Incident at Alkali Sink"	Don McDougall	Thomas Thompson	May 24, 1963	8530
Rowdy takes a newly-married couple along with the outfit in a search for water, with the bride's father in pursuit of them.
144	31	"Abilene"	Tony Leader	Story by : Charles Larson; Teleplay by : Charles Larson & Elliot Arnold	May 31, 1963*	3032
The drovers arrive at their destination but are prevented from moving on with life by a quarantine. When the quarantine is lifted, they plan to begin a new drive. * This episode appears hidden on the Season 4 DVD boxset extras as preview episode for season 5 the last disc. There has been much confusion over its actual air date and although it was originally planned for season 4, it aired at the end of season 5.

=== Season 6 (1963–64) ===
No. overall	No. in season	Title	Directed by	Written by	Original release date	Prod. code
145	1	"Incident of the Red Wind"	Thomas Carr	Dean Reisner	September 26, 1963	1401
Rowdy is sent to search for water and meets a man who claims he knows how to get the herd through the area, but Rowdy must boss when Gil falls over a cliff, and when other drovers are injured, he begins to suspect sabotage.
146	2	"Incident of Iron Bull"	Christian Nyby	Carey Wilber	October 3, 1963	1404
Former warriors meet in Gil's outfit and narrowly avoid another outbreak of war.
147	3	"Incident at El Crucero"	Earl Bellamy	Charles Larson	October 10, 1963	1402
A feisty girl with many brothers falls in love with Gil as he plots to get his herd across her land, and Gil is conflicted about whether to quit bossing and stay in El Crucero.
148	4	"Incident of the Travellin' Man"	Ted Post	Paul King	October 17, 1963	1403
A man wearing leg irons washes up in the river. Gil invites him to travel with the outfit, but comes to regret it.
149	5	"Incident at Paradise"	Thomas Carr	Charles Larson	October 24, 1963	1409
A struggling farmer attempts to convince the people of Paradise Valley to act more kindly, but is unsuccessful until a flood is averted with the drovers' help.
150	6	"Incident at Farragut Pass"	Thomas Carr	Jack Turley	October 31, 1963	1405
A wealthy woman won't let the drovers cross her land unless they will take along her unruly grandson.
151	7	"Incident at Two Graves"	Harry Harris	Story by : Al C. Ward; Teleplay by : Al C. Ward & Samuel Roeca	November 7, 1963	1410
An fighting Irishman takes a shine to Rowdy and lets him in on his last life's dream.
152	8	"Incident of the Rawhiders"	Ted Post	Story by : Jay Simms; Teleplay by : Jack Turley & Jay Simms	November 14, 1963	1414
When Rowdy stumbles into some rawhiders and is coerced into marrying one, Gil appears to be willing to give him enough rope to hang himself with.
153	9	"Incident of the Prophecy"	Thomas Carr	Samuel Roeca	November 21, 1963	1406
Gil's drovers accidentally kill a man, and the outfit is followed by the dead man's brothers looking for vengeance.
154	10	"Incident at Confidence Creek"	Harry Harris	Jack Turley	November 28, 1963	1413
A man cons the drovers out of the herd, until Rowdy and the man's partner pull a con of their own.
155	11	"Incident of the Death Dancer"	Thomas Carr	Dean Riesner	December 5, 1963	1411
An African lion who has escaped from Elitch Gardens in Denver, called Death Dancer, is hunter and huntee when the drovers meet a man looking for revenge on the animal.
156	12	"Incident of the Wild Deuces"	Harry Harris	Story by : Preston Wood; Teleplay by : Preston Wood & Jack Turley	December 12, 1963	1416
Mushy is lucky at poker and wins a crooked dealer's money, leaving Rowdy and Wishbone to save him and his money.
157	13	"Incident of the Geisha"	Ted Post	Charles Larson	December 19, 1963	1407
A Japanese servant girl and the drovers meet and learn important lessons as they handle a band of Indians who believe that the girl is a goddess.
158	14	"Incident at Ten Trees"	Ted Post	Story by : A.I. Bezzerides; Teleplay by : Carey Wilber	January 2, 1964	1412
A woman being called a witch by the Cheyenne is befriended by the drovers and reveals a tragedy.
159	15	"Incident of the Rusty Shotgun"	Ted Post	Story by : Robert M. Stevens; Teleplay by : Paul King	January 9, 1964	1415
Wishbone runs into a family who's determined that he's the long-awaited fiance of their spinster sister.
160	16	"Incident of the Midnight Cave"	Thomas Carr	Story by : Barry Trivers; Teleplay by : Barry Trivers & Samuel Roeca	January 16, 1964	1417
A mishap frightens Wishbone and leads him to think he is blind, until another frightening incident shocks him out of it.
161	17	"Incident of the Dowery Dundee"	Ted Post	Story by : Samuel Roeca & Joy Dexter; Teleplay by : Samuel Roeca	January 23, 1964	1418
Gil is called upon to judge between an expectant mother and her estranged husband, and must reunite the two of them before his herd is upset by her cattle.
162	18	"Incident at Gila Flats"	Thomas Carr	Story by : Samuel Roeca; Teleplay by : Paul King & Samuel Roeca	January 30, 1964	1419
Enemies overlook prejudices just in time to save a part of the drovers' outfit stranded between warring natives.
163	19	"Incident of the Pied Piper"	Harry Harris	Story by : Albert Aley; Teleplay by : Albert Aley & Samuel Roeca	February 6, 1964	1420
Gil must get his cattle and his money back when a stampede sends the herd toward a man running an orphanage.
164	20	"Incident of the Swindler"	Thomas Carr	Story by : Jack Turley; Teleplay by : John Hawkins & Jack Turley	February 20, 1964	1422
Wishbone is coerced into helping a former acquaintance and finds a former flame.
165	21	"Incident of the Wanderer"	Christian Nyby	Carey Wilber	February 27, 1964	1423
A man who comes upon the drovers after a storm convinces them to take him miles out of their way, seemingly for nothing.
166	22	"Incident at Zebulon"	Christian Nyby	Dean Riesner	March 5, 1964	1421
Gil is horsewhipped when he tries to save a drover from lynching, and he's determined to clean the town of Zebulon from the men who cleaned it up.
167	23	"Incident at Hourglass"	Christian Nyby	John Hawkins	March 12, 1964	1425
Gil must take his own court-martial defense in hand when a former acquaintance frames him for murder.
168	24	"Incident of the Odyssey"	Thomas Carr	Story by : Samuel Roeca & Sheldon Stark; Teleplay by : Samuel Roeca	March 26, 1964	1426
Gil is reminded to treat his drovers like grown men by a jovial traveler searching for the woman he loves.
169	25	"Incident of the Banker"	Christian Nyby	Chris Miller	April 2, 1964	1427
Gil is sick of the men's attitudes, and accepts the situation when he gets stuck trading jobs with a banker.
170	26	"Incident at Deadhorse: Part 1"	Thomas Carr	Paul King	April 16, 1964	1428
A professional hangman is rescued by Rowdy and Quince when his enemies bury him alive, and in turn saves Hey Soos when he is bitten by a rattlesnake. Burgess Meredith and Broderick Crawford from Highway Patrol guest stars.
171	27	"Incident at Deadhorse: Part 2"	Thomas Carr	Paul King	April 23, 1964	1428
The hangman whom the drovers rescued is determined to carry out his job in the town of Deadhorse despite discouragement from the townspeople, and the drovers are persuaded to back him up.
172	28	"Incident of the Gilded Goddess"	Christian Nyby	Don Brinkley	April 30, 1964	1408
An old acquaintance of Rowdy's who is accused of murder shanghais him into helping her escape the law, until he begins to see through her story and his emotions.
173	29	"Incident at Seven Fingers"	Christian Nyby	Story by : John Hawkins; Teleplay by : John Hawkins & John Dunkel	May 7, 1964	1430
A Buffalo soldier (William Marshall) escaping the army shows himself to be loyal and generous, going against the charges he faces upon capture.
174	30	"Incident of the Peyote Cup"	Thomas Carr	Dick Nelson	May 14, 1964	1424
A tribe of Indians who were half-converted to Christianity long ago attempts to kill Hey Soos and the missionary who taught them.

=== Season 7 (1964–65) ===
No. overall	No. in season	Title	Directed by	Written by	Original release date	Prod. code
175	1	"The Race"	Bernard McEveety	Robert Lewin	September 25, 1964	2704-0906
Rowdy disagrees with Gil and they each end up bossing a herd in a race to the next destination.
176	2	"The Enormous Fist"	Bernard L. Kowalski	Sam Ross	October 2, 1964	2704-0905
In the process of hiring in a town with job shortages, Gil is accused of killing a man, and his conscience keeps him working to take care of the man's widow and children.
177	3	"Piney"	Philip Leacock	Clyde Ware	October 9, 1964	2704-0911
Gil hopes to pick up some drovers when he meets an old acquaintance, but the man is carrying out his own scheme to recapture the wealth he was cheated out of.
178	4	"The Lost Herd"	Vincent McEveety	Archie L. Tegland	October 16, 1964	2704-0910
A hard decision on the trail costs Gil his herd, but his honesty gains him a new herd at the end of the driving season.
179	5	"A Man Called Mushy"	Michael O'Herlihy	John Mantley	October 23, 1964	2704-0914
A mistake and a misunderstanding lead Mushy to leave the drovers' team, and he lands in a lot of hot water.
180	6	"Canliss"	Jack Arnold	Stirling Silliphant	October 30, 1964	2704-0902
A gunfighter and his wife come to a festival, but the situation is not as it seems.
181	7	"Damon's Road: Part 1"	Michael O'Herlihy	Richard Carr & Robert Lewin	November 13, 1964	2704-0912
In a spoof of the Western, Gil and his drovers are fooled by a harsh, greedy railroad builder who's lost his crew.
182	8	"Damon's Road: Part 2"	Michael O'Herlihy	Richard Carr & Robert Lewin	November 20, 1964	2704-0912
Gil gives tit for tat and won't stop until he gets back the outfit he lost to a greedy railroader.
183	9	"The Backshooter"	Herschel Daugherty	Richard Carr	November 27, 1964	2704-0904
Rowdy is mistaken for the man who shot a robber with a price on his head, and is shunned as he works to uncover the truth.
184	10	"Corporal Dasovik"	Bernard L. Kowalski	Lionel E. Siegel	December 4, 1964	2704-0915
A minor officer with no experience stands by his convictions when his detachment and circumstances are against him.
185	11	"The Photographer"	Vincent McEveety	Clyde Ware	December 11, 1964	2704-0918
Rowdy is assigned to escort an irritating photo enthusiast to a rendezvous, and discovers just how quick-thinking the man is.
186	12	"No Dogs or Drovers"	Vincent McEveety	Sam Ross & Cliff Gould	December 18, 1964	2704-0919
Gil and Rowdy are given special treatment in town, while the rest of the drovers aren't welcomed anywhere.
187	13	"The Meeting"	Michael O'Herlihy	Robert Lewin	January 1, 1965	2704-0916
Gil and another trail boss are kidnapped by a pack of outlaws being herded by a big businessman intent on commanding a beef empire.
188	14	"The Book"	Bernard L. Kowalski	Cliff Gould	January 8, 1965	2704-0908
A bookie with no limits is responsible for many deaths in a small town, until Rowdy wins a shooting contest with a faster draw than the man's prize gunfighter.
189	15	"Josh"	Herschel Daugherty	Robert E. Thompson	January 15, 1965	2704-0920
An aging cattle man can't bring himself to accept the job Gil can give him, but his prospects everywhere else are negative.
190	16	"A Time for Waiting"	Charles Rondeau	Sy Salkowitz	January 22, 1965	2704-0903
Rowdy is asked to visit a man he helped condemn to hang and consider changing the testimony he gave at the court-martial.
191	17	"Moment in the Sun"	Bernard Girard	Bernard Girard	January 29, 1965	2704-0913
Gil is stronghanded into accepting a former drover who's bringing a wanted man into Denver, along with the expected complications.
192	18	"Texas Fever"	Harmon Jones	John Dunkel	February 5, 1965	2704-0926
To save Pete from hanging, Gil must uncover who's been rustling cattle and murdering those who could tell. Nearly a repeat episode of Season 3, Episode 18, "Incident of the Running Iron".
193	19	"Blood Harvest"	Justus Addiss	Walter Black	February 12, 1965	2704-0927
An old man brings his grandson to the boy's father working on Gil's drive, to see if the man can be trusted with the job of father.
194	20	"The Violent Land"	Harmon Jones	Buckley Angell	March 5, 1965	2704-0928
In a nod to Season 2 episode Incident of the Valley in Shadow, Rowdy experiences the same as Gil, in being captured by Indians and helping to find a white girl living with them.
195	21	"The Winter Soldier"	Justus Addiss	John Dunkel	March 12, 1965	2704-0930
A soldier deserts his post by hanging on with Gil's outfit and some travelers who have been with the cattle drive, and the cowboys are held responsible for dealing with him.
196	22	"Prairie Fire"	Jesse Hibbs	Teleplay by : Elliott Arnold & Louis Vittes; Story by : Elliott Arnold	March 19, 1965	
Wishbone and Gil each have a herd that is growing desperate for rain, and a lot of things on the prairie are burning.
197	23	"Retreat"	James Goldstone	John Dunkel	March 26, 1965	
Gil is trapped into helping a colonel right a wrong he committed on the eve of his retirement.
198	24	"The Empty Sleeve"	Justus Addiss	Story by : Endre Bohem; Teleplay by : Louis Vittes	April 2, 1965	
A one-armed drover is sent with Pete and others into a town he used to be associated with, looking for salt to keep the herd from dying, and he and those he knew face the past.
199	25	"The Last Order"	Robert L. Friend	Tom Seller	April 9, 1965	
When $50,000 shows up in camp, Gil is determined to keep it secure no matter what.
200	26	"Mrs. Harmon"	Michael O'Herlihy	John Mantley	April 16, 1965	
Wishbone meets the family of a man who no drover outfit will hire, and quits the drive to help, including covering for the man's wife when she shoots her husband.
201	27	"The Calf Women"	Tony Leader	Story by : Buckley Angell; Teleplay by : Louis Vittes & Buckley Angell	April 30, 1965	
Mushy gifts the drive's calves to two sisters who are running their father's ranch, and Rowdy falls in love with the older sister, who gives her life to save him.
202	28	"The Spanish Camp"	Harmon Jones	John Dunkel	May 7, 1965	
A dying doctor and his apprentice prevent the drovers from reaching water with their treasure digging, but both sides successfully negotiate to avoid loss of life and get what they want.
203	29	"El Hombre Bravo"	Philip Leacock	Herman Groves	May 14, 1965	
When Gil and Mushy pick up some steers from across the Mexican border, they meet an infamous man escaping the Mexican revolutionaries and the Mexican federal officers by escorting a band of children to a mission in New Mexico. Gil must take charge of helping the children to safety when the officers catch up to the man and his friends.
204	30	"The Gray Rock Hotel"	Stuart Rosenberg	Jack Curtis	May 21, 1965	
Gil's outfit arrives in a deserted town very sick with a mysterious illness, and meet a woman running from her past crimes.

=== Season 8 (1965) ===
No. overall	No. in season	Title	Directed by	Written by	Original release date
205	1	"Encounter at Boot Hill"	Sutton Roley	Anthony Spinner	September 14, 1965
Rowdy has taken control of the cattle drive, and can't find justice for a drover who is killed by a man taking the law into his own hands.
206	2	"Ride a Crooked Mile"	Justus Addiss	Story by : N.B. Stone; Teleplay by : N.B. Stone & Herman Miller	September 21, 1965
The loyalty of Rowdy's men is tested by a prize horse.
207	3	"Six Weeks to Bent Fork"	Thomas Carr	Mort R. Lewis	September 28, 1965
Rowdy is given a lucrative deal by a cattle owner, but obstacles plague the time-limited drovers all the way along the trail. Rowdy finally uses the herd to protect the whole outfit and show a corrupt sheriff and a disrespectful ramrod how much his word means.
208	4	"Walk into Terror"	Thomas Carr	Story by : Jerry Adelman; Teleplay by : Joanna Thompson & Jerry Adelman	October 5, 1965
When Simon and Quince are trapped in a mine shaft, the race is on to free them before the air runs out.
209	5	"Escort to Doom"	Alan Crosland	Walter Black	October 12, 1965
Rowdy hires some Chiricahua to move the herd along, but the drovers are unsure how things will turn out when the Chiricahuas' enemies, the Pawnee, also show up.
210	6	"Hostage for Hanging"	Herman Hoffman	Walter Black	October 19, 1965
A family reneges on a deal with the drovers and holds Rowdy for ransom.
211	7	"The Vasquez Woman"	Bernard McEveety	Boris Ingster, Louis Vittes	October 26, 1965
Rowdy's drovers have their herd commandeered for worthless money issued by the Mexican revolutionaries, and consider using the Mexican commander's estranged wife to exchange for the herd. His wife insists on returning to him, but only out of love for someone else.
212	8	"Clash at Broken Bluff"	Charles Larson	Story by : Louis Vittes; Teleplay by : Louis Vittes & Ed Adamson	November 2, 1965
The drovers are caught up in an election feud between townspeople and a female rancher who wants women's suffrage.
213	9	"The Pursuit"	Justus Addiss	John Dunkel	November 9, 1965
A marshal comes after Jed, and Jed and Rowdy stand up for each other until the case can be cleared up.
214	10	"Duel at Daybreak"	Sutton Roley	Story by : Robert Bloomfield; Teleplay by : Robert Bloomfield & Herman Miller	November 16, 1965
Rowdy contracts with a man (Charles Bronson) who has an uncertain past, and their men on both sides make the association personal.
215	11	"Brush War at Buford"	Thomas Carr	Mort R. Lewis	November 23, 1965
The drovers become mixed up with parties who can't forget the War Between the States is over, and must cut their way through the shenanigans on both sides to keep the herd moving.
216	12	"The Testing Post"	Gerd Oswald	John Hawkins, Ward Hawkins	November 30, 1965
A band of robbers posing as U.S. Army take some of the herd, and Rowdy and Jed head out to right matters.
217	13	"Crossing at White Feather"	Richard Whorf	Robert Bloomfield	December 7, 1965
A father and son pair among the drovers reminds Rowdy of his relationship with his own father, complete with a disastrous scheme.
