= Waterfront (1955 TV series) =

American television series

- Starring: Preston Foster
- Country of origin: United States
- Original language: English
- No. of seasons: 2
- No. of episodes: 78

Production
- Running time: 30 minuets
- Production company: Ziv Company

Original release
- Network: Syndication
- Release: August 21, 1954 – 1955

Waterfront is a syndicated half-hour American television drama series that starred Preston Foster as the captain of the harbor tug Cheryl Ann. The series was filmed 1954–1955 by Roland Reed Productions, Inc., for the Ziv Company, in part on location at the Port of Los Angeles. Although Foster had been a Broadway, Vaudeville, and Hollywood actor since his 20s, he grew up in coastal cities in New Jersey, worked as a clerk for a shipping company when he was 20, and was an officer in the United States Coast Guard during World War II. He was quoted as insisting on authenticity where possible in the production.

== Production ==
Preston Foster portrayed Captain John Herrick, a tugboat captain at Los Angeles Harbor, operating from Berth 14 in San Pedro, in 78 episodes, production of which concluded in 1955. It also starred Douglas Dick, Lois Moran, Willie Best and Harry Lauter. Moran portrayed Herrick's wife. Lauter and Dick played his sons, and Billy Chapin portrayed his grandson. Best was seen as the tugboat's cook. Others in the cast were Pinky Tomlin as deckhand Tip Hubbard and Eddy Waller as lighthouse keeper Jonathan Beal.

Foster said, “On Waterfront, I insisted that we use the real locale. We went down to Los Angeles harbor and got a lot of good background shots. The Coast Guard supplied the equipment we needed, and I even learned how to handle the tugboat myself.”

The actor left the program to make the pilot for a new program, “Test Pilot,” which, ultimately, did not make it into series production. Foster explained that the end of Waterfront was a financial decision.

“We’ve made 78 of them,” he said. “That’s enough for two years, including 26 weeks of reruns. The show is still riding high, and we could probably make more."

“But the profit is in the second runs. It’s important to sell them in the second-run market while the show’s popularity is high; you get a better price for them."

“Now is when the producers cash in on the investment. So far they haven’t made a profit. I’m the only one who has - because I was under salary.”

== Episodes ==
=== Season 1 (1954) ===
No. overall	No. in season	Title	Directed by	Written by	Original release date
1	1	"The Skipper's Day"	John Brahm	Teleplay by : M. Bernard Fox and Jesse L. Lasky Jr.	August 21, 1954
2	2	"Sunken Treasure Of San Pedro"	Phil Karlson	Teleplay by : Warren Wilson	August 28, 1954
3	3	"Lighthouse"	Phil Karlson	Teleplay by : Robert J. Shaw	September 5, 1954
4	4	"A New Whistle For The Cheryl Ann"	Hollingsworth Morse	Teleplay by : Warren Wilson	September 12, 1954
5	5	"Cap'n Long John"	Hollingsworth Morse	Story by : Warren Wilson; Teleplay by : Marjorie Hunt Pierson	September 19, 1954
6	6	"Term Paper"	John Brahm	Teleplay by : M. Bernard Fox and Robert J. Shaw	September 26, 1954
7	7	"Cap'n John's Dilemma"	Phil Karlson	Teleplay by : Arthur Hoerl	October 3, 1954
8	8	"Family Problems"	Phil Karlson	Teleplay by : M. Bernard Fox, Eugene Ling, and Robert J. Shaw	October 10, 1954
9	9	"Sea Bells"	John Brahm	Teleplay by : Norman Reilly Raine	1954
10	10	"Tug O'War"	Phil Karlson	Teleplay by : Charles Belden	1954
11	11	"Tailor-Made Trouble"	Hollingsworth Morse	Teleplay by : Burt Sims and Arthur Hoerl	1954
12	12	"Troubled Waters"	Phil Karlson	Teleplay by : Frank L. Moss and Lee Berg	1954
13	13	"The Rift"	Phil Karlson	Teleplay by : Lillie Hayward	1954
14	14	"First Mate"	Ted Post	Story by : Robert C. Dennis; Teleplay by : Arthur Hoerl and Louis Vittes	1954
15	15	"Warehouse Incident"	Phil Karlson	Teleplay by : David Dortort	1954
16	16	"High Water"	Ted Post	Story by : Charles Belden; Teleplay by : Charles Belden and Louis Vittes	1954
17	17	"Floating Mine"	Ted Post	Teleplay by : Sidney Biddell and Frederic M. Frank	1954
18	18	"Fog Bound"	Phil Karlson	Teleplay by : Frank L. Moss and Lee Berg	1954
19	19	"Live Cargo"	Ted Post	Teleplay by : David Dortort	1954
20	20	"Cap'n Christopher"	Ted Post	Teleplay by : James O'Hanlon	1954
21	21	"Tension"	Ted Post	Story by : Adrian Spies; Teleplay by : Arthur Hoerl and Louis Vittes	1954
22	22	"Back Wash"	Ted Post	Teleplay by : Lillie Hayward	1954
23	23	"Diamonds In The Rough"	Ted Post	Story by : John Tucker Battle; Teleplay by : John Tucker Battle, Louis Vittes, and Warren Wilson	1954
24	24	"The Long Beach Pier"	Ted Post	Story by : John Tucker Battle; Teleplay by : John Tucker Battle, Louis Vittes, and Warren Wilson	1954
25	25	"Portia Of The Sea"	Ted Post	Teleplay by : Frank L. Moss and Lee Berg	1954
26	26	"Anchors Of The Past"	Ted Post	Teleplay by : Eugene Vale and Frank L. Moss	1954
27	27	"Driftwood"	Ted Post	Teleplay by : Frank L. Moss and Lee Berg	1954
28	28	"Drawbridge Incident"	Ted Post	Teleplay by : Sidney Biddell and Frederic M. Frank	1954
29	29	"Tuna Clipper"	Ted Post	Teleplay by : Frederic M. Frank	1954
30	30	"The White Ducks"	Phil Karlson	Teleplay by : David Dortort	1954
31	31	"Star Bright"	Ted Post	Teleplay by : Frank L. Moss	1954
32	32	"Harbor Piracy"	Phil Karlson	Teleplay by : David Lang	1954
33	33	"The Sea And Captain Taggart"	Ted Post	Teleplay by : Bernie Giler	1954
34	34	"Ghost Tug"	Ted Post	Teleplay by : Elizabeth Wilson	1954
35	35	"F.O.B. Vera Cruz"	Ted Post	Teleplay by : Robert J. Shaw	1954
36	36	"Night At The Lighthouse"	Ted Post	Teleplay by : James O'Hanlon	1954
37	37	"Live Bait"	Ted Post	Teleplay by : Jack Laird	1954
38	38	"Oil Island"	Ted Post	Teleplay by : Douglas Morrow	1954
39	39	"Christmas In San Pedro"	Ted Post	Teleplay by : Eugene Ling	1954

=== Season 2 (1954–55) ===
No. overall	No. in season	Title	Directed by	Written by	Original release date
40	1	"Fisherman's Fiesta"	Ted Post	Teleplay by : Elizabeth Wilson	August 28, 1954
41	2	"Yellow Flag"	Ted Post	Teleplay by : Charles Belden and Frank L. Moss	1954
42	3	"Floating Bottle"	Ted Post	Teleplay by : Endre Bohem and Louis Vittes	1954
43	4	"The Reluctant Guest"	Ted Post	Teleplay by : Douglas Morrow	1955
44	5	"Homing Flight"	Ted Post	Teleplay by : Endre Bohem and Louis Vittes	1955
45	6	"Farnum's Folly"	Ted Post	Teleplay by : Bernie Giler, Endre Bohem, and Louis Vittes	1955
46	7	"Trial By Fire"	Ted Post	Teleplay by : David Dortort	1955
47	8	"Shipper, Beware"	Ted Post	Teleplay by : Bernie Giler	1955
48	9	"Captain Without a Ship"	Frederick Stephani	Teleplay by : Frank L. Moss	1955
49	10	"The Man"	Ted Post	Story by : Curt Siodmak; Teleplay by : John A. Kneubuhl	1955
50	11	"The Skipper and The Padre"	Ted Post	Teleplay by : James and Jean O'Hanlon	1955
51	12	"The Sea Rustler"	Frederick Stephani	Teleplay by : David Lang and Stan Jones	1955
52	13	"Shakedown Cruise"	Ted Post	Teleplay by : John Kneubuhl	1955
53	14	"Trestle Point"	Frederick Stephani	Teleplay by : David Dortort	1955
54	15	"The Search"	Ted Post	Teleplay by : Douglas Morrow	1955
55	16	"The Artful Horse"	Paul Landres	Teleplay by : Endre Bohem and Louis Vittes	1955
56	17	"Tuna Bound"	Ted Post	Teleplay by : Lee Perenchio and Violet Atkins	1955
57	18	"The Semi-Private Room"	Ted Post	Teleplay by : Douglas Morrow	1955
58	19	"Beyond The Line"	Frederick Stephani	Teleplay by : Frank L. Moss	1955
59	20	"The Angel Louise"	Ted Post	Teleplay by : Violet Atkins and Lee Perenchio	1955
60	21	"Stand By All Stations"	Paul Landres	Story by : Stan Jones; Teleplay by : David Dortort	1955
61	22	"Ferry Boat Ride"	Ted Post	Teleplay by : John Kneubuhl	1955
62	23	"The Seal"	Ted Post	Teleplay by : Douglas Morrow	1955
63	24	"Safe Harbor"	Paul Landres	Teleplay by : James and Jean O'Hanlon	1955
64	25	"The Race"	Ted Post	Teleplay by : Douglas Morrow	1955
65	26	"The Rescue"	Ted Post	Teleplay by : Douglas Morrow	1955
66	27	"Double Exposure"	Ted Post	Teleplay by : Bernie Giler	1955
67	28	"Mike"	Ted Post	Teleplay by : John Kneubuhl	1955
68	29	"The Hideout"	Ted Post	Teleplay by : Douglas Morrow	1955
69	30	"Captain For A Day"	Ted Post	Teleplay by : Endre Bohem and Louis Vittes	1955
70	31	"Catalina Swim"	Paul Landres	Teleplay by : Lee Perenchio and Violet Atkins	1955
71	32	"Beached"	Ted Post	Teleplay by : Bernie Giler	1955
72	33	"Red Label Cargo"	Ted Post	Teleplay by : John Kneubuhl	1955
73	34	"Sea Explorers"	Paul Guielfoyle	Teleplay by : Bernie Giler	1955
74	35	"Bait Cruise"	Ted Post	Teleplay by : Violet Atkins and Lee Perenchio	1955
75	36	"The Yacht Race"	Ted Post	Teleplay by : Douglas Morrow	1955
76	37	"Trouble Ship"	Ted Post	Teleplay by : David Dortort and Douglas Morrow	1955
77	38	"The Rivals"	Ted Post	Teleplay by : Douglas Morrow	1955
78	39	"Harbor Bound"	Ted Post	Teleplay by : David Dortort	1955
