= Eric Fleming =

American actor (1925–1966)

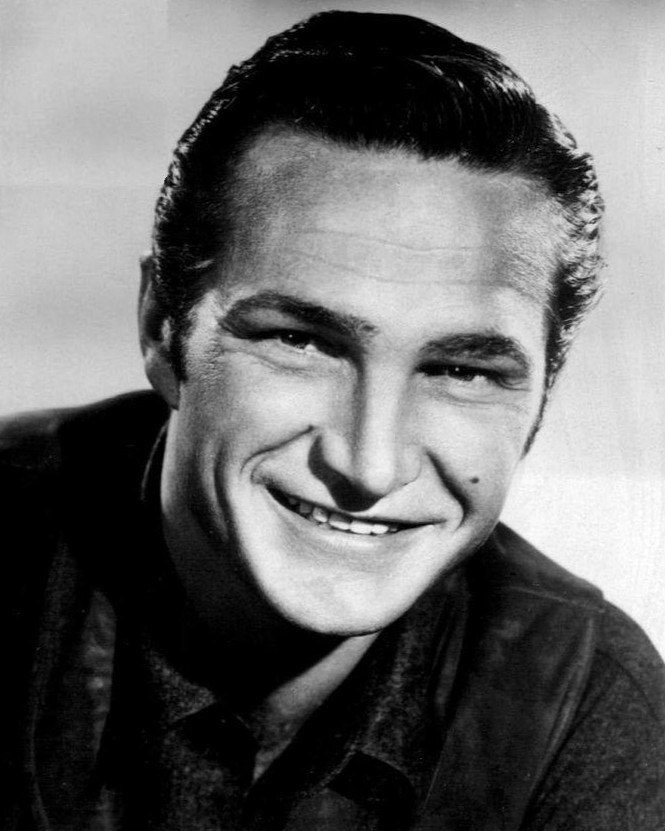
- Fleming in 1961
- Born: Edward Heddy Jr. July 4, 1925; Santa Paula, California, U.S.
- Died: September 28, 1966 (aged 41); Tingo María, Peru
- Occupation: Actor
- Years active: 1944–1966
- Partner: Lynne Garber

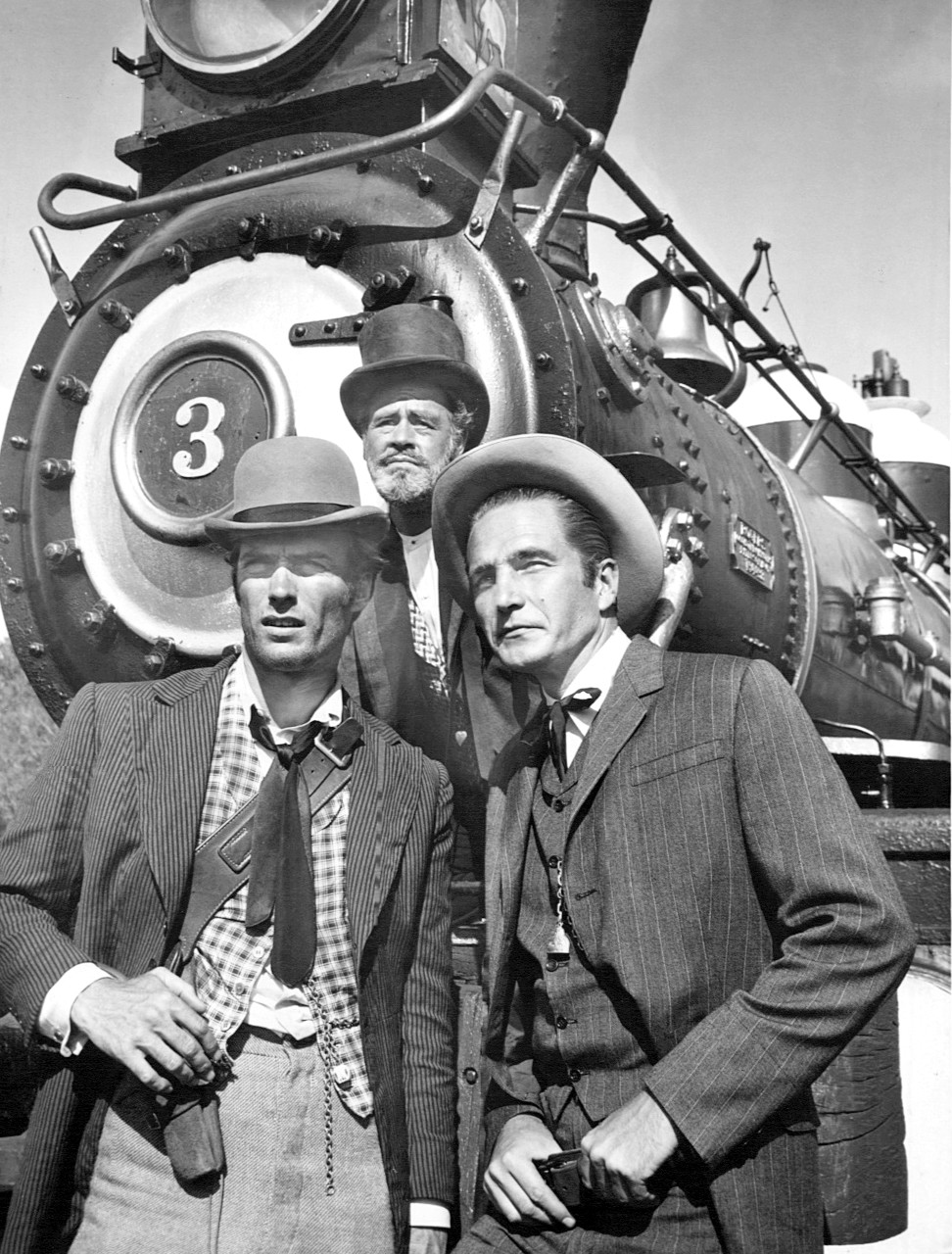
Clint Eastwood, Paul Brinegar and Eric Fleming in Rawhide (1961)

Eric Fleming (born Edward Heddy Jr.; July 4, 1925 – September 28, 1966) was an American actor known primarily for his role as Gil Favor in the long-running CBS Western television series Rawhide.

== Early life ==
Fleming was born as Edward Heddy Jr. in Santa Paula, California, the only child of Mildred (née Anderson) and Edward Heddy.

Born with a club foot, he needed crutches to get around and was often severely beaten by his father. At the age of eight, he attempted to kill his father with a gun, which jammed. He left home shortly after, first to Los Angeles, and then to Chicago, where he lived roughly and associated with gangsters, doing odd jobs for them to make money. At the age of 11, after being wounded in a gunfight between some gangsters and hospitalized, he was returned home to his mother, who had recently divorced.

During the Depression, he dropped out of school and worked at various jobs until he joined the Merchant Marine, before joining the United States Navy in 1942 for World War II. He was a Seabee in the 88th Naval Construction Battalion as a carpenter. He served until 1945 and became a petty officer second class.

He received severe facial injuries during a bet in which he was attempting to lift a 200-pound (91 kg) weight and had to undergo extensive plastic surgery to reconstruct his forehead, nose, and jaw. Before this, Fleming had always thought himself "ugly" and considered the incident a "wonderful balance of values."

After his facial reconstruction, he returned to Paramount Studios, where he had been working as a construction worker, grip, and carpenter. He made a bet with an actor that he could do a better audition. He lost the bet and it cost him $100 and "I lost a lot of pride too, which hurt but the $100 hurt worse." Upon deciding that acting had cost him $100, and acting would get it back, he entered acting classes at the studio in the evenings.

Fleming's acting debut came in a road company production of Happy Birthday. He appeared on stage in Chicago and in a number of successful Broadway plays, including the musical Plain and Fancy. He began acting in television shows about the same time. Fleming then moved to Hollywood and starred in several low-budget films, including Fright, Curse of the Undead, and the cult classic Queen of Outer Space.

== Rawhide ==
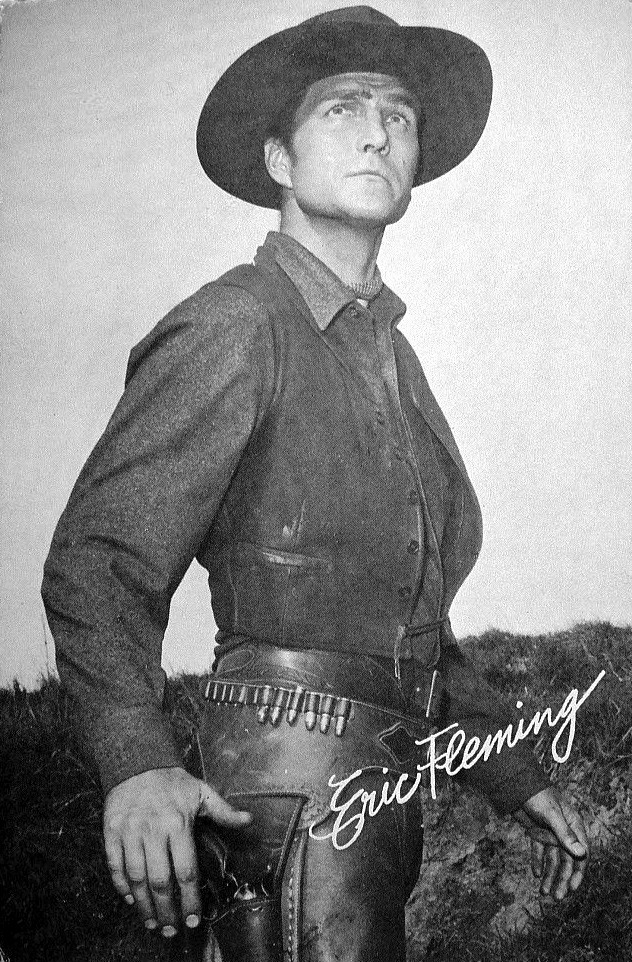
Postcard

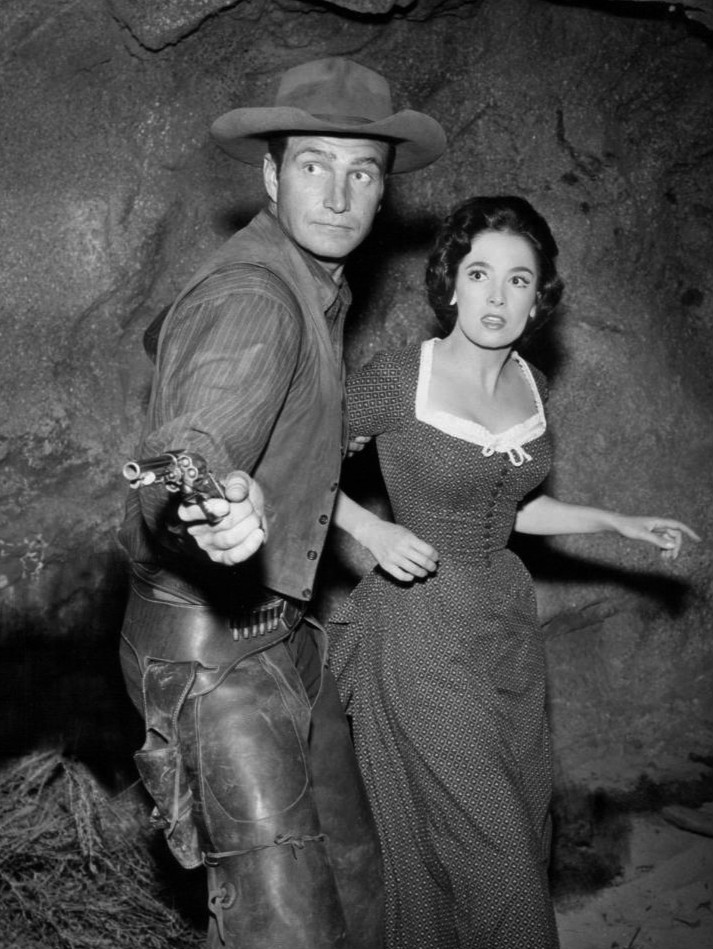
With Linda Cristal (1959)

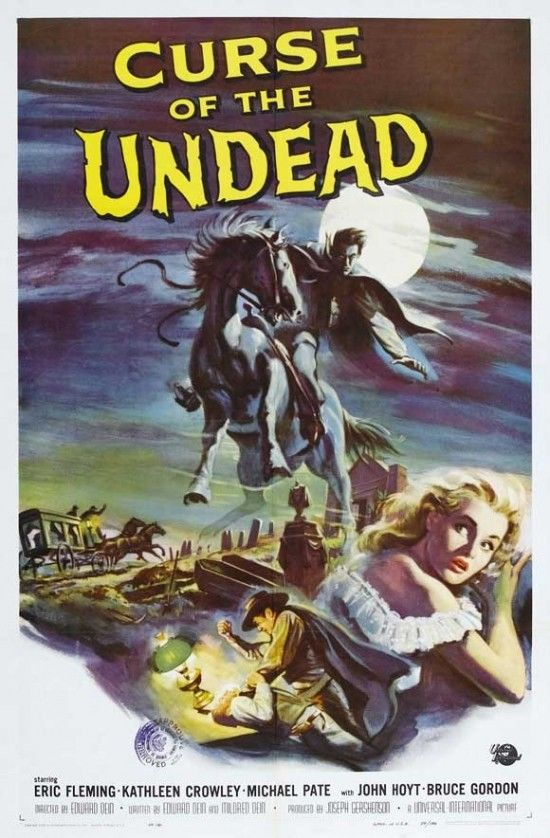
Poster with Fleming on horseback

In 1958, the 6-foot, 3 1/2-inch (192 cm) Fleming landed the starring role as trail boss Gil Favor in Rawhide. Set in the 1860s, Rawhide portrayed the challenges faced by the men of the cattle drive from San Antonio, Texas, to Sedalia, Missouri. Producer Charles Marquis Warren called on the diary written in 1866 by trail boss George C. Duffield to shape the character of Favor: a savvy, strong, and fair leader who persevered and got the job done.

The top-rated Western, with co-stars Clint Eastwood, Sheb Wooley, and Paul Brinegar, ran from 1959 to 1966. Fleming and Eastwood more or less rotated in playing the lead from week-to-week, but the former was always billed first. Fleming also co-wrote two Rawhide scripts—"Incident of the Night on the Town" (season three, episode 29) and "A Woman's Place" (season four, episode 25).

Fleming, Wooley (trail scout Pete Nolan), James Murdock (Wishbone's clumsy meal assistant Mushy), Robert Cabal (wrangler Hey Soos), and Rocky Shahan (drover Joe Scarlet) were all dismissed by Ben Brady during Rawhide’s summer 1965 hiatus prior to shooting the eighth season. The recently installed sixth executive producer of Rawhide had been tasked with revitalizing the series and reversing declining ratings. Fleming boasted to TV Guide that "CBS fired me because they were paying me a million dollars a year" (only $220,000 to be exact).

With Eastwood promoted against his better judgment to trail boss, the cattle drive continued for 13 episodes before CBS chief William S. Paley preemptively axed it that December. Another cancellation factor, according to Eastwood, was that "Rawhide had been the network's only show to get a rating on Friday night, so they switched us to Tuesday opposite a show with the same type of male audience, Combat!" (ABC's gritty World War II drama starring Rick Jason and Vic Morrow involving the Western Front).

== The Glass Bottom Boat and Bonanza ==
Fleming rebounded with a supporting role as a suave spy in The Glass Bottom Boat, a Doris Day comedy vehicle, and also guest-starred in three episodes of the number-one rated, family-themed NBC Western Bonanza alongside Michael Landon (as Little Joe Cartwright) and action director William Witney. Effective as the sadistic Wes Dunn in the titular "Peace Officer" from season seven, Fleming was brought back by series creator David Dortort for the subsequent season to star as honorable Mormon rancher Heber Clauson in "The Pursued", a two-parter exploring religious persecution and intolerance. The first installment was aired only four days after Fleming's accidental death.

== High Jungle and death ==
Fleming signed to star in High Jungle, a two-part episode of the short-lived Off to See the Wizard, also intended for theatrical distribution in Europe. Six weeks into the location shoot in Peru, Fleming and co-star Nico Minardos were in a dugout canoe that overturned in the Huallaga River. Minardos managed to swim to safety. Fleming was swept away by the current and drowned on September 28, 1966, at age 41, leaving behind fiancée Lynne Garber. His body was recovered three days later. Production of the episode was terminated.

== Selected filmography ==
Year	Title	Role	Notes
1955	Conquest of Space	Capt. Barney Merritt	
1956	Fright	Dr. James Hamilton	
1958	Queen of Outer Space	Capt. Neal Patterson	
1959	Curse of the Undead	Preacher Dan	
1966	The Glass Bottom Boat	Edgar Hill	

== Selected television appearances ==
Year	Title	Role	Notes
1956	Secret File, U.S.A.	German Sergeant	Episode "Mission Rhino"
1956	The Big Story		Episode "The Victor Reisel Story "
1956	The Phil Silvers Show	Rory Mundane	Episode "Hollywood"
1956	The Phil Silvers Show	USN Recruiting Chief	Episode "The Recruiting Sergeant "
1956	The Phil Silvers Show	Private Mike McLusty	Episode "The Face on the Recruiting Poster "
1957	Suspicion		Episode "Heartbeat"
1958	The Silent Service	Lt. Cmdr. C. C. Kirkpatrick	Episode "The Triton's Christmas"
1958	Studio One	Jace Farrow	Episode "The Strong Man"
1958	Flight		Episode "Master Sergeant"
1959-1965	Rawhide	Gil Favor	Cast Regular
1966	Bonanza	Heber Clauson	Episode "The Pursued, part I and 2"
1966	Bonanza	Wes Dunn	Episode "Peace Officer"
1967	Off to See the Wizard		Episode "High Jungle"
