= Robert J. Shaw =

American television writer

- Born: November 11, 1917; Pewaukee, Wisconsin, US
- Died: March 30, 1996 (aged 78); Los Angeles
- Occupation: Writer, teacher

Robert J. Shaw (1917–1996) was an American television writer with 39 credits and teacher of screenwriting at UCLA.

== Career ==
Shaw attended the University of Wisconsin. In 1940 he sold Front Page Farrell to NBC. He subsequently went on to work on Mr. District Attorney, The Million Dollar Face, Hawaiian Eye, Medical Center, The F.B.I., and Portia Faces Life. With Robert Montgomery Presents, Shaw launched his television writing career. He worked on Hawaiian Eye, Peyton Place, Dallas ("The Gathering Storm"), 77 Sunset Strip, Search for Tomorrow, Somerset, CBS Daytime 90 (1974: starring Constance Towers, Brett Halsey and Tom Happer) and General Hospital (ex-head writer). Shaw died on March 30, 1996, in Los Angeles

== Recognition ==
Shaw earned seven Emmy Awards nominations during his career.

== Filmography ==
=== Films ===
Year	Film	Credit	Notes
1978	The Users	Screenplay By	Television Movie
1981	The Million Dollar Face	Story By	Television Movie

=== Television ===
Year	TV Series	Credit	Notes
1950–56	Robert Montgomery Presents	Writer	13 Episodes
1953	Schlitz Playhouse of Stars	Writer	3 Episodes
1953	Suspense	Writer	1 Episode
1954	Waterfront	Writer	3 Episodes
1954–55	Danger	Writer	2 Episodes
1955	Pond's Theater	Writer	1 Episode
1955–56	Star Tonight	Writer	2 Episodes
1956	Kraft Television Theatre	Writer	2 Episodes
1956–57	NBC Matinee Theater	Writer	4 Episodes
1958	Harbormaster	Writer	1 Episode
1958	Man with a Camera	Writer	1 Episode
1958	Target	Writer	1 Episode
1958–59	Highway Patrol	Writer	3 Episodes
1959	The David Niven Show	Writer	1 Episode
1959	The Detectives	Writer	1 Episode
1959	M Squad	Writer	1 Episode
1959	The Troubleshooters	Writer	1 Episode
1959	Zorro	Writer	1 Episode
1959–60	This Man Dawson	Writer	2 Episodes
1959–63	Hawaiian Eye	Writer	19 Episodes
1960	Lock-Up	Writer	1 Episode
1960	Michael Shayne	Writer	1 Episode
1960	Surfside 6	Writer	1 Episode
1960–61	The Roaring 20's	Writer	3 Episodes
1961–63	77 Sunset Strip	Writer	3 Episodes
1962	Checkmate	Writer	2 Episodes
1963	Ripcord	Writer	1 Episode
1964	The Lieutenant	Writer	3 Episodes
1964–65	Peyton Place	Writer	16 Episodes
1965	Our Private World	Writer	2 Episodes
1966	The Long Hot Summer	Writer, Executive Story Consultant	10 Episodes
1966–67	The F.B.I.	Writer	2 Episodes
1969–73	Medical Center	Writer, Story Consultant	6 Episodes
1974	CBS Daytime 90	Writer	1 Episode
1974–75	Somerset	Head Writer	
1977–80	Search for Tomorrow	Writer	6 Episodes
1980–81	Dallas	Writer, Story Editor	12 Episodes
1981–85	General Hospital	Writer	17 Episodes
