= Mervyn Nelson =

American actor

Mervyn Nelson (c. 1915 – 17 August 1991) was a stage actor, writer, director and producer. At the age of five, he started acting in vaudeville theatre, and then performed in Broadway theatre shows during the 1940s and 1950s, including Early to Bed in 1943. His stage performances were well reviewed in Billboard.

In 1950, he wrote and produced an all-black revue called The Jazz Train which told the story of the history of jazz music and featured musical accompaniment from a number of top jazz performers. He also wrote and directed the 1971 cult gay drama movie Some of My Best Friends Are....

He died at the age of 76 on 17 August 1991. Mervyn is buried in Locust Valley Cemetery, Locust Valley, New York.
