= Off to See the Wizard =

American television series

Off to See the Wizard is an American television anthology series, partially animated but mostly live action, produced by MGM Animation/Visual Arts and telecast on ABC-TV between 1967 and 1968 that was narrated by Hal Holbrook.

== History ==
The series derived its name from the well-known song "We're Off to See the Wizard", featured in MGM's classic 1939 film The Wizard of Oz. Such was the popularity of the film among TV audiences by then that ABC decided to build an anthology series around it, a series which primarily showcased the first network telecasts of some of MGM's most popular recent live-action family films, much as Walt Disney had often showcased the first telecasts of his films on the Disney anthology television series. Animated versions of Dorothy Gale, Toto, the Scarecrow, the Tin Woodman, the Cowardly Lion, and the Wizard of Oz book-ended each episode of the series, often providing humorous introductions to the films. Chuck Jones, who provided the animation, served as executive producer.

A never-aired two-part episode consisted of a feature entitled High Jungle, which was scrapped after actor Eric Fleming drowned during filming.

The series also used music from the famous MGM film. The opening credits featured an unseen chorus singing a stanza of "Over the Rainbow" and segued into Dorothy and her three friends singing "We're Off to See the Wizard."

=== Featured films ===
The series ran only an hour, so full-length films had to be split into two parts, much as Disney used to do on its television anthology series. Films shown on the series in order of appearance include:

- Clarence, the Cross-Eyed Lion (1965)
- Flipper (1963)
- Alexander the Great filmed in 1963 with William Shatner, John Cassavetes and Adam West but never previously shown. Directed by Phil Karlson
- Hell Cats (a 1964 television pilot starring George Hamilton)
- Island of the Lost
- Lili (1953)
- Mike and the Mermaid (pilot)
- Rhino!
- The Adventures of Huckleberry Finn (1960)
- Gypsy Colt (1953)
- Untamed World
- Who's Afraid of Mother Goose?
- Wild World
- Zebra in the Kitchen (1965)
- The Glass Slipper (1955)
- Captain Sindbad (1963)

== Cast ==
- Mel Blanc - Cowardly Lion
- Daws Butler - Scarecrow, Wizard of Oz
- Don Messick - Toto, Tin Man
- June Foray - Dorothy Gale, Wicked Witch of the West
