= Some of My Best Friends Are... =

1971 film

- Directed by: Mervyn Nelson
- Written by: Mervyn Nelson
- Produced by: John Lauricella; Martin Richards
- Starring: Fannie Flagg; Rue McClanahan; Candy Darling
- Cinematography: Tony Mitchell
- Edited by: Richard Cadenas; Angelo Ross
- Music by: Gordon Rose
- Distributed by: American International Pictures
- Release date: October 27, 1971
- Running time: 110 minutes
- Country: United States
- Language: English

Some of My Best Friends Are... is a 1971 drama film written and directed by Mervyn Nelson and starring Fannie Flagg, Rue McClanahan, and Candy Darling.

== Premise ==
On Christmas Eve 1971, in Manhattan's Greenwich Village, a group of gay men and lesbians meet at the mob-owned Blue Jay Bar to talk about their lives and relationships.

== Cast ==
- Fannie Flagg as Helen/Mildred
- Rue McClanahan as Lita Joyce
- Candy Darling as Karen/Harry
- David Drew as Howard
- Tom Bade as Tanny
- Jim Enzel as Gable
- Jeff David as Leo
- Nick De Noia as Phil
- Clifton Steere as Gertie
- James Murdock (credited as David Baker) as Clint
- Paul Blake as Kenny
- Carleton Carpenter as Miss Untouchable
- Robert Christian as Eric
- Dick O'Neill as Tim
- Gary Campbell as Terry
- Gil Gerard as Scott
- Lou Steele as Barrett
- Uva Harden as Michel
- Ben Yaffe as Marvin
- Gary Sandy as Jim
- Peg Murray as Terry's mother
- Sylvia Syms as Sadie

== Reception ==
Vincent Canby, in an unfavorable review, called the movie "a second-rate spin-off from The Boys in the Band," with "hammy performances and a sentimental screenplay that sounds as if it had just been let out after 30 years in a closet."

When most of the characters in a movie are as full of dopey sentiments, as well as of self-hatred and of self-exploitation, as the movie that contains them, it's almost impossible to differentiate between an intentional second-rateness and serious moviemaking of no great quality. It's impossible, that is, until it becomes obvious that Mervyn Nelson, who both wrote the screenplay and directed the film, shares with his characters not only a large amount of boozy self-pity, but also the sort of romanticism that permits characters to define themselves—without irony—in the clichés of old-fashioned Hollywood soap opera. Better performances might possibly have given some life to such lines and situations, but under Mr. Nelson's solemn direction, they sound like parodies of real emotions.

== See also ==
- List of American films of 1971
- List of Christmas films
- List of LGBTQ-related films
