= High Jungle =

Unfinished episode of Off to See the Wizard

High Jungle was a planned two-part episode of an anthology series Off to See the Wizard. It was abandoned due to the death of star Eric Fleming.

== Cast ==
- Eric Fleming
- Anne Heywood
- Nico Minardos

== Production ==
Fleming arrived in Lima on 17 August.

Six weeks into the location shoot in Peru, Fleming and co-star Nico Minardos were in a dugout canoe that overturned in the Huallaga River. Minardos managed to swim to safety. Fleming was swept away by the current and drowned on September 28, 1966, at age 41.

In October it was decided to abandon the film.
