= Rawhide (TV series) =

American Western television series (1959–1965)

- Opening title sequence
- Genre: Western
- Created by: Charles Marquis Warren
- Starring: Eric Fleming; Clint Eastwood; Paul Brinegar; Sheb Wooley; John Ireland; Raymond St. Jacques
- Theme music composer: Dimitri Tiomkin (music); Ned Washington (lyrics)
- Opening theme: "Rawhide" performed by Frankie Laine
- Composers: Bernard Herrmann; Rudy Schrager; Nathan Scott; Fred Steiner; Lyn Murray; Richard Shores; Johnny Green; Don B. Ray; Hugo Friedhofer; Billy May
- Country of origin: United States
- Original language: English
- No. of seasons: 8
- No. of episodes: 217 (list of episodes)

Production
- Executive producer: Ben Brady
- Producers: Endre Bohem; Vincent M. Fennelly; Bruce Geller; Bernard L. Kowalski; Charles Marquis Warren; Robert E. Thompson
- Production locations: California; Tucumcari, New Mexico
- Cinematography: Neal Beckner; Philip H. Lathrop; John M. Nickolaus Jr.; Howard Schwartz; Jack Swain
- Editors: James Baiotto; Leon Barsha; Gene Fowler Jr.; George A. Gittens; Frank Gross; Roland Gross; Jack Kampschroer; George Watters
- Running time: 50 min.
- Production company: CBS Television Network Productions

Original release
- Network: CBS
- Release: January 9, 1959 – December 7, 1965

Rawhide is an American Western television series starring Eric Fleming and Clint Eastwood. The show aired for seven seasons on the CBS network on Friday nights from January 9, 1959, to September 3, 1965, before moving to its eighth and final season on Tuesday nights from September 14, 1965, until December 7, 1965, with a total of 217 black-and-white episodes. The series was produced and sometimes directed by Charles Marquis Warren, who also produced early episodes of Gunsmoke. The show is remembered by many for its theme song, "Rawhide".

Spanning 7 1/2 years, Rawhide was the sixth-longest-running American television Western, exceeded only by Wagon Train, The Virginian, Bonanza, Death Valley Days, and Gunsmoke.

== Synopsis ==
Set in the 1860s, Rawhide portrays the challenges faced by the drovers of a cattle drive as they drove cattle from Texas to Sedalia, Missouri which for a time was the western end of the railroad. Most episodes are introduced with a monolog by Gil Favor, trail boss. In a typical Rawhide story, the drovers come upon people on the trail and involve themselves in their affairs, or one or more of the crew venture into a nearby town and get themselves into trouble. Rowdy Yates was young and at times impetuous in the earliest episodes, and Favor had to keep a tight rein on him.

Story lines ranged from parched plains to anthrax, ghostly riders to wolves, cattle raiding, bandits, murderers, and others. A frequent story line was the constant need to find water for the cattle. The scout spent much of his time looking for water, sometimes finding that water holes and even rivers had dried up.

Spanning seven years, Rawhide frequently dealt with controversial topics. Robert Culp played an ex-soldier on the drive who had become dangerously addicted to morphine. Mexican drover "Hey Soos" faced racism at times from outside the crew. Some American Indians demanded cattle as payment for going through their land and several episodes deal with the aftermath of the American Civil War, which ended four years earlier.

== Cast members ==
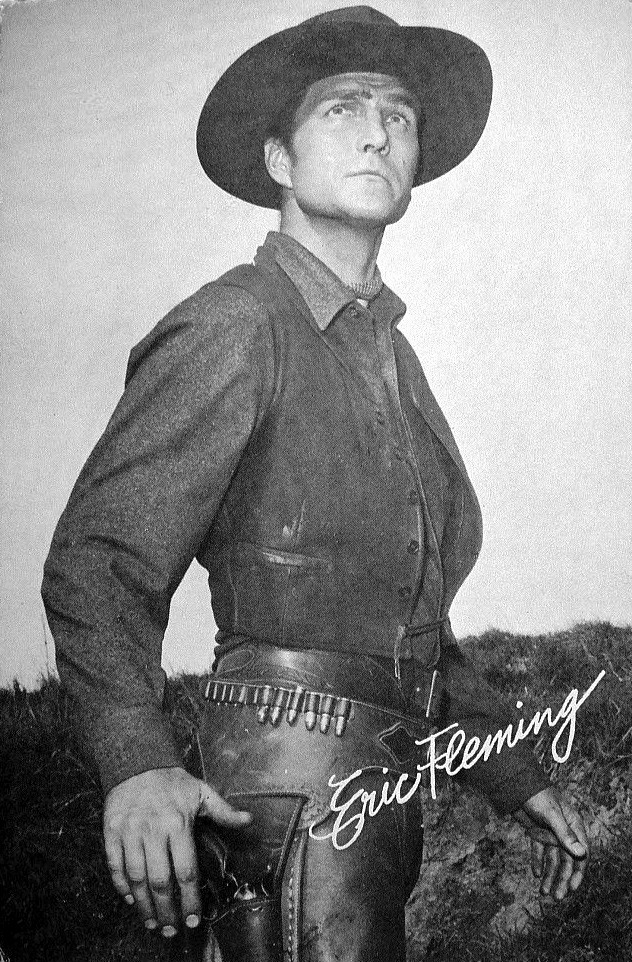
Eric Fleming postcard

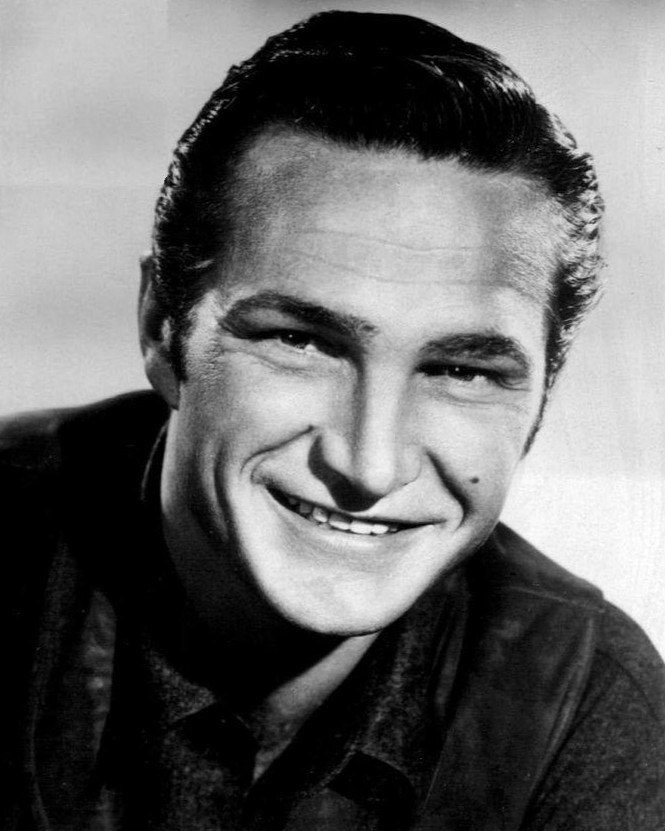
Eric Fleming as Gil Favor

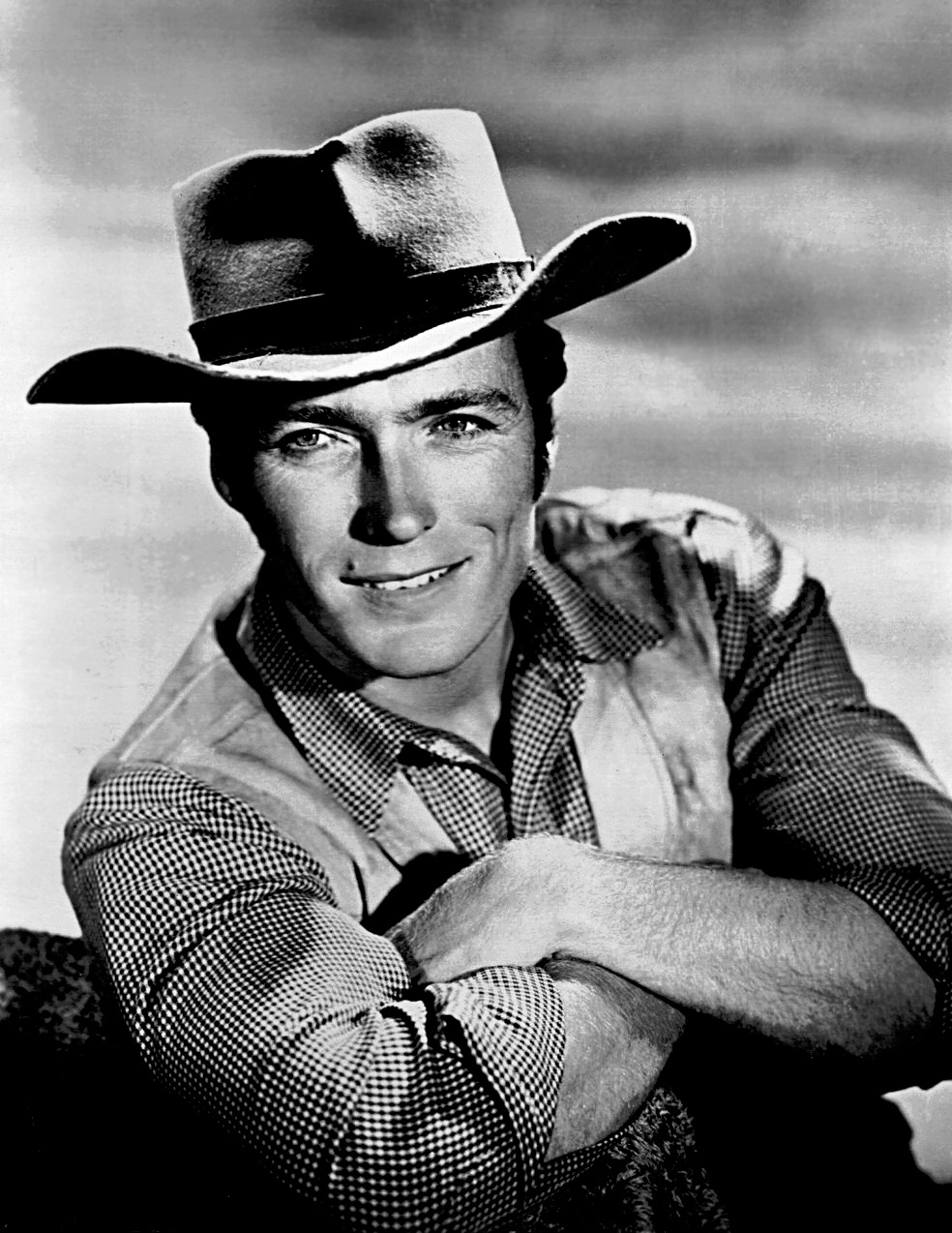
Clint Eastwood as Rowdy Yates

Regular cast members included:

- Eric Fleming as trailboss Gil Favor (seasons 1 to 7)
- Clint Eastwood as ramrod Rowdy Yates (seasons 1 to 7) (and trailboss in season 8)
- Sheb Wooley as scout Pete Nolan (seasons 1 to 4, later season 7 nine episodes)
- Paul Brinegar as the cantankerous cook, George Washington Wishbone (seasons 1 through 8)
- Robert Cabal as the wrangler, "Hey Soos" Patines (seasons 1 to 7)
- James Murdock as Wishbone's assistant, Harkness "Mushy" Mushgrove III (seasons 1 to 7)
- Steve Raines as drover Jim Quince (seasons 1 to 7, ramrod in season 8)
- Rocky Shahan as drover Joe Scarlet (seasons 1 to 7)
- Don C. Harvey as drover Collins (seasons 1 to 4)
- John Erwin as drover Teddy (seasons 2 to 4, 6 to 7)
- John Hart as drover Narbo (season 4, two appearances in season 7)
- William R. Thompkins as drover Toothless (season 2 to 7)
- John Cole as drover Bailey (season 1 to 5, one appearance in season 6)
- Milan Smith as drover Kyle (season 1 to 2)
- Charles H. Gray as Clay Forrester (seasons 4 and 5 only, one appearance in season 6)
- Paul Comi as Yo Yo (season 7 only)
- John Ireland as Jed Colby (season 8 only)
- Raymond St. Jacques as rider Simon Blake (season 8 only)
- David Watson as Ian Cabot (season 8 only)

=== Notable guest stars ===
- Nick Adams
- Claude Akins
- Eddie Albert
- Lola Albright
- Tod Andrews
- Morris Ankrum
- Michael Ansara
- Mary Astor
- Frankie Avalon
- Martin Balsam
- John Drew Barrymore
- Richard Basehart
- Arthur Batanides
- Charles Bateman
- Ed Begley
- Ralph Bellamy
- Shelley Berman
- Ken Berry
- James Best
- Lyle Bettger
- Robert Blake
- Neville Brand
- Beau Bridges
- Charles Bronson
- Rory Calhoun
- Macdonald Carey
- John Cassavetes
- Lon Chaney Jr.
- James Coburn
- Iron Eyes Cody
- Pat Conway
- Elisha Cook Jr.
- Jeff Corey
- Broderick Crawford
- Robert L. Crawford Jr.
- Linda Cristal
- Robert Culp
- Ken Curtis
- Royal Dano
- Jim Davis
- Albert Dekker
- John Dehner
- Bruce Dern
- John Dierkes
- Troy Donahue
- Ann Doran
- Bobby Driscoll
- James Drury
- Brian Donlevy
- Dan Duryea
- Buddy Ebsen
- Barbara Eden
- Jack Elam
- Leif Erickson
- Bill Erwin
- Gene Evans
- Jay C. Flippen
- Nina Foch
- Paul Fix
- Sally Forrest
- Steve Forrest
- Anne Francis
- James Franciscus
- Beverly Garland
- Leo Gordon
- Dabbs Greer
- Alan Hale Jr.
- Julie Harris
- Darryl Hickman
- Kim Hunter
- Rick Jason
- Chubby Johnson
- Russell Johnson
- Victor Jory
- Brian Keith
- DeForest Kelley
- Douglas Kennedy
- George Kennedy
- Wright King
- Frankie Laine
- Martin Landau
- Harry Lauter
- Cloris Leachman
- Ruta Lee
- Suzanne Lloyd
- June Lockhart
- Robert Loggia
- Julie London
- Jack Lord
- Peter Lorre
- Gavin MacLeod
- Jock Mahoney
- William Marshall
- Dean Martin
- Strother Martin
- Carole Mathews
- Frank Maxwell
- Mercedes McCambridge
- Darren McGavin
- Victor McLaglen
- Burgess Meredith
- Dina Merrill
- Emile Meyer
- Robert Middleton
- Vera Miles
- Martin Milner
- Elizabeth Montgomery
- Terry Moore
- Agnes Moorehead
- Ed Nelson
- Leslie Nielsen
- Leonard Nimoy
- Warren Oates
- Margaret O'Brien
- Dan O'Herlihy
- Susan Oliver
- J. Pat O'Malley
- Debra Paget
- Michael Pate
- Luana Patten
- Slim Pickens
- Walter Pidgeon
- Edward Platt
- Denver Pyle
- Claude Rains
- Cesar Romero
- Mickey Rooney
- Marion Ross
- Madlyn Rhue
- Albert Salmi
- William Schallert
- Robert F. Simon
- Everett Sloane
- Harry Dean Stanton
- Barbara Stanwyck
- Bob Steele
- Charles Stevens
- Woody Strode
- Barbara Stuart
- Olive Sturgess
- Gloria Talbott
- Rip Torn
- Audrey Totter
- Forrest Tucker
- Miyoshi Umeki
- Lee Van Cleef
- Dick Van Patten
- James Whitmore
- Frank Wilcox
- Robert J. Wilke
- Chill Wills
- Marie Windsor
- Hank Worden
- Ed Wynn
- Dick York
- John Zaremba
Rawhide cast
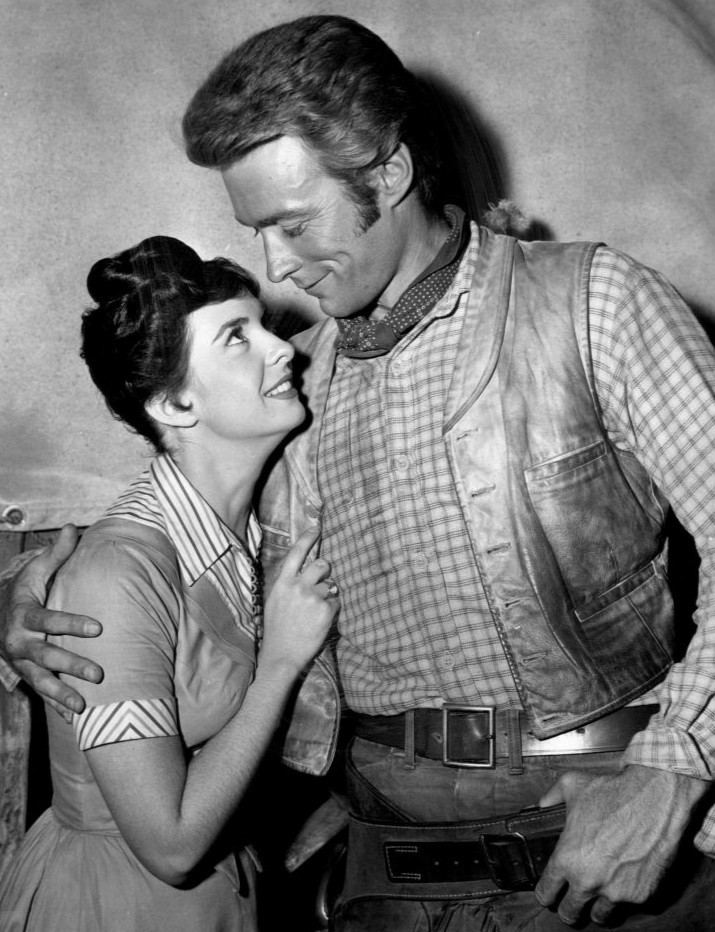
Margaret O'Brien and Clint Eastwood (1959)

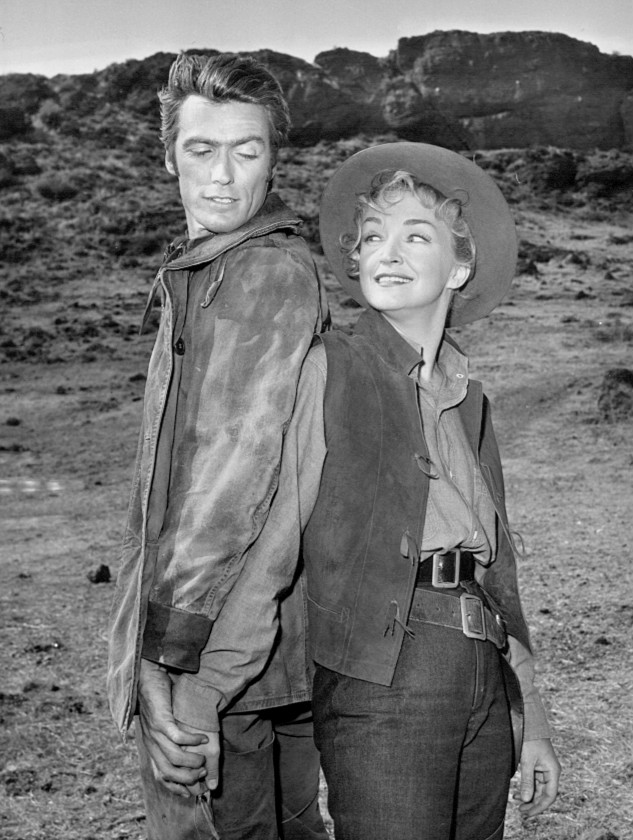
Clint Eastwood and Nina Foch (1959)

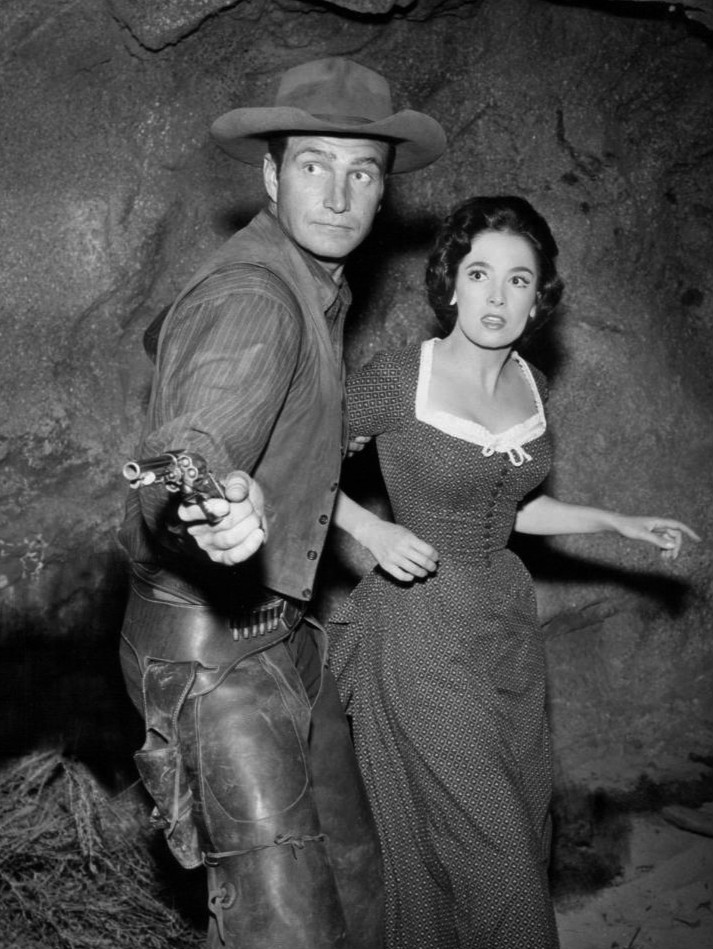
Fleming and Linda Cristal (1959)

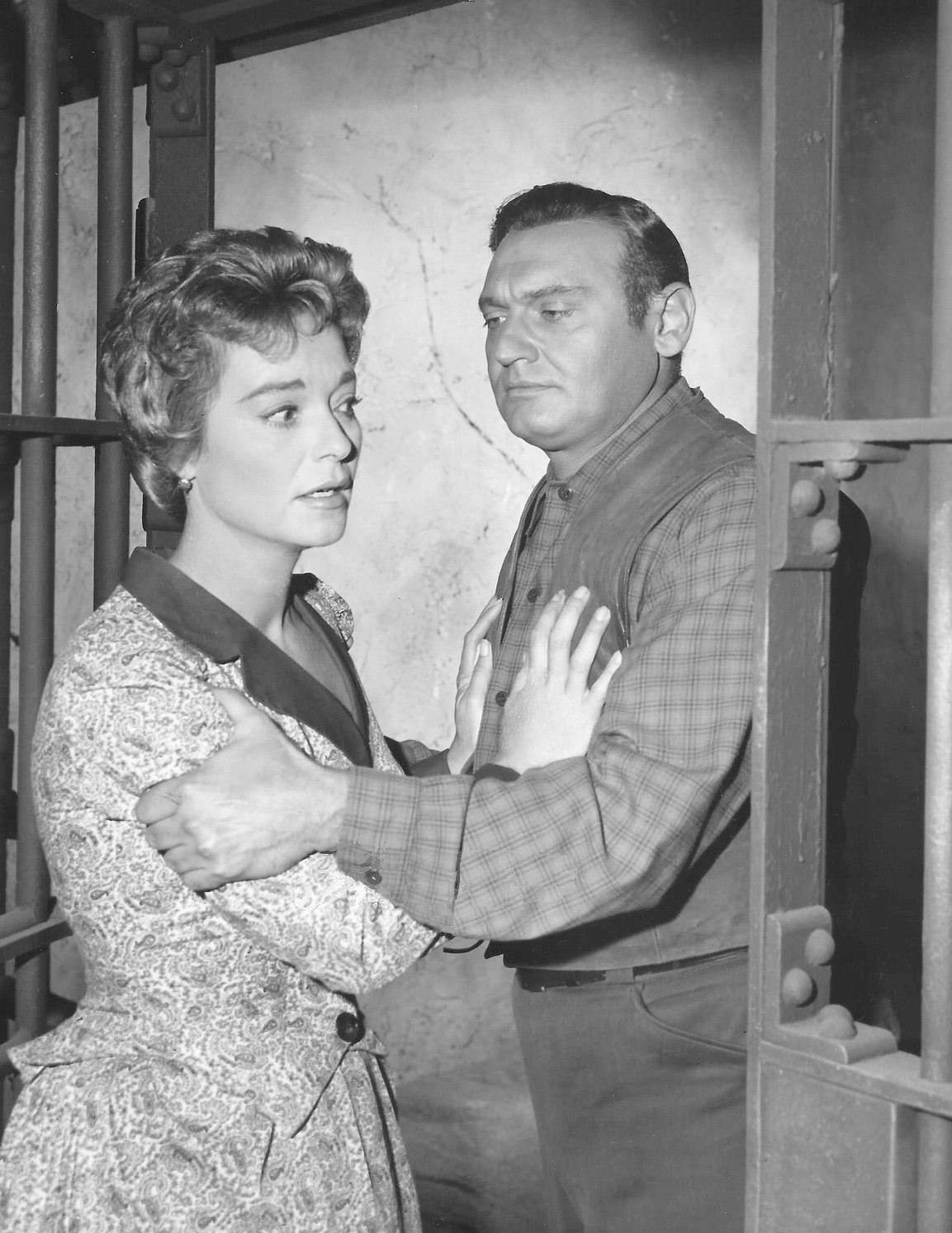
Nan Grey and Frankie Laine (1960)

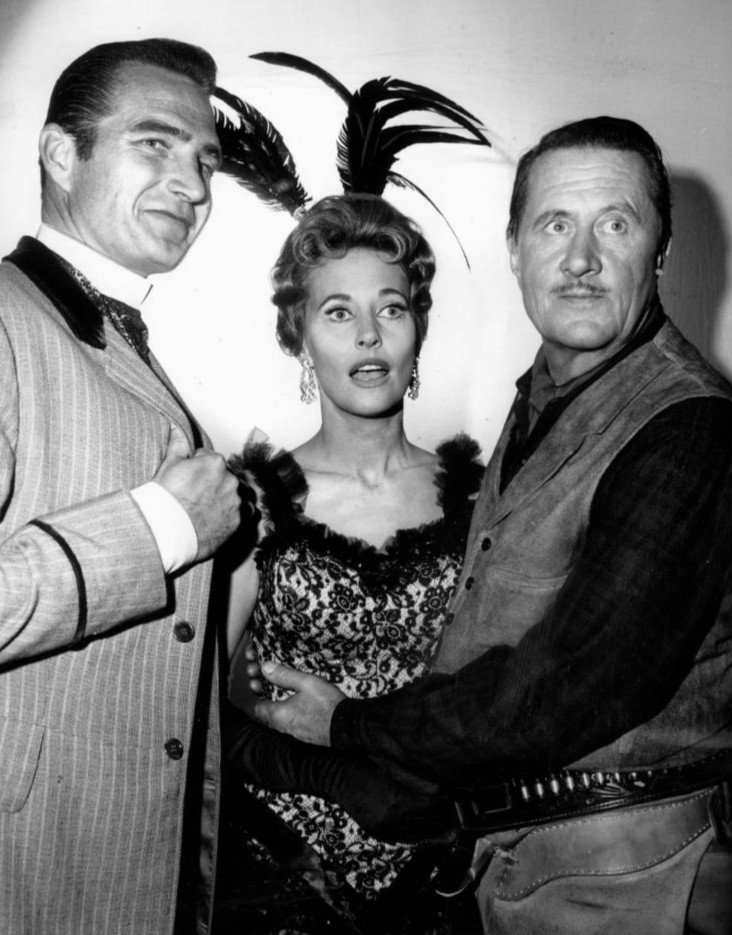
Fleming, Lola Albright, Allyn Joslyn (1964)

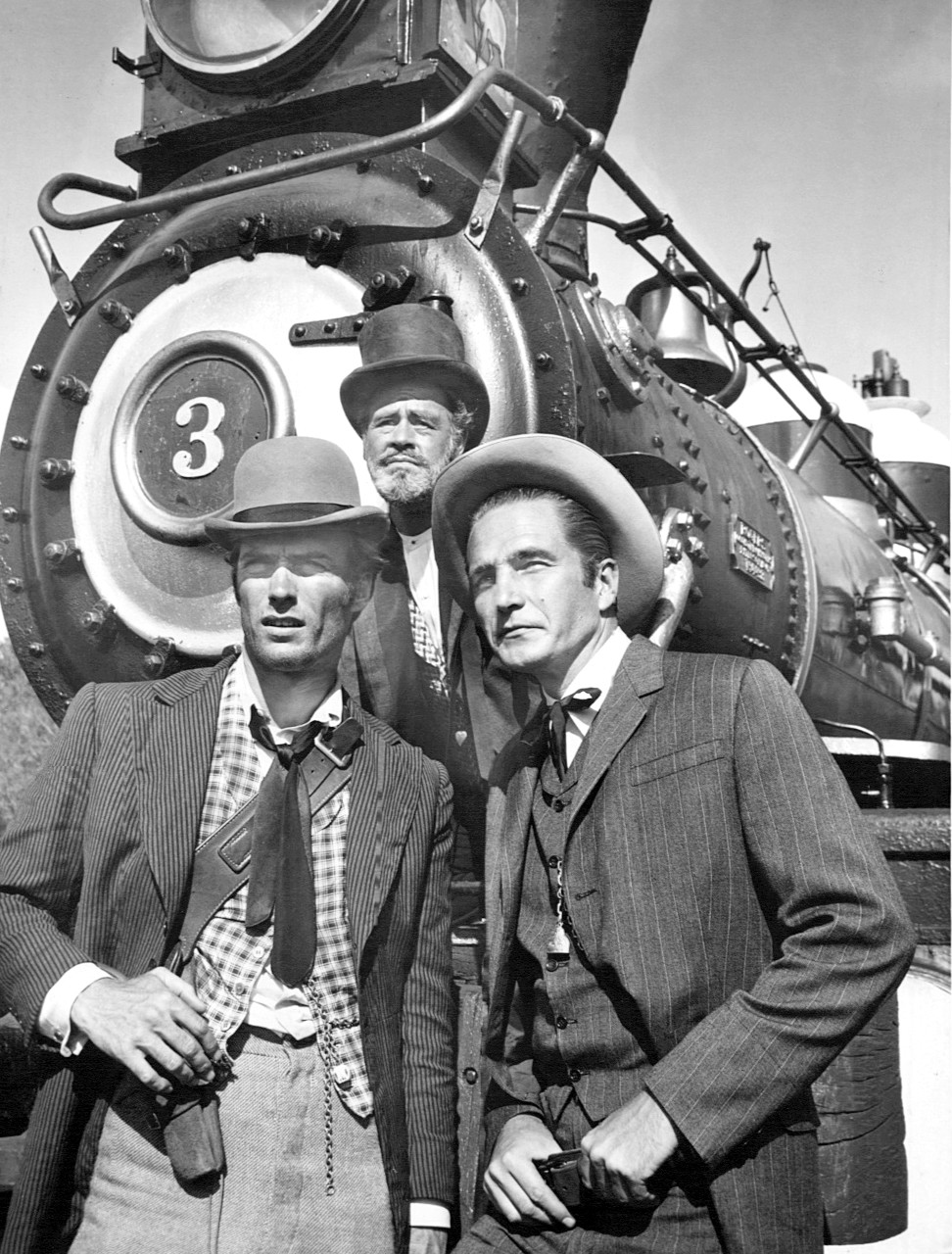
Eastwood, Brinegar, Fleming (1959)

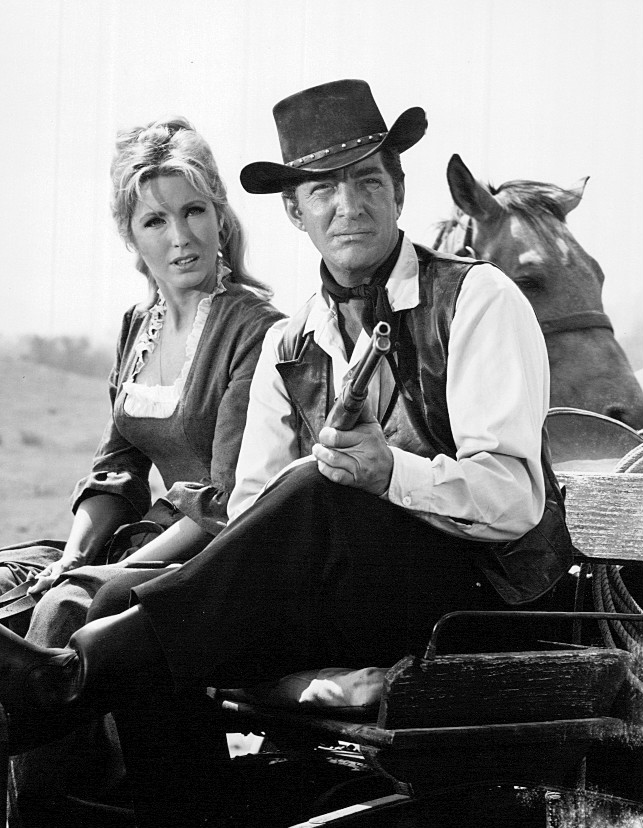
Laura Devon and Dean Martin (1964)

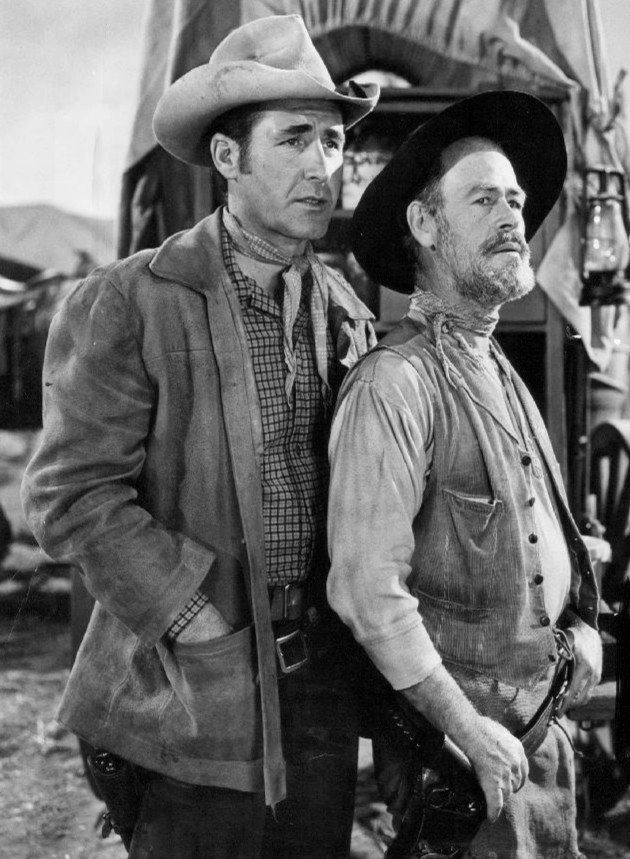
Sheb Wooley and Brinegar (1962)

== Episodes ==
Season	Episodes	Originally released	
Season	Episodes	First released	Last released
1	23	January 9, 1959	July 10, 1959
2	31	September 18, 1959	June 17, 1960
3	30	September 30, 1960	June 16, 1961
4	29	September 29, 1961	May 11, 1962
5	31	September 21, 1962	May 31, 1963
6	30	September 26, 1963	May 14, 1964
7	30	September 25, 1964	May 21, 1965
8	13	September 14, 1965	December 7, 1965

== Background and production ==
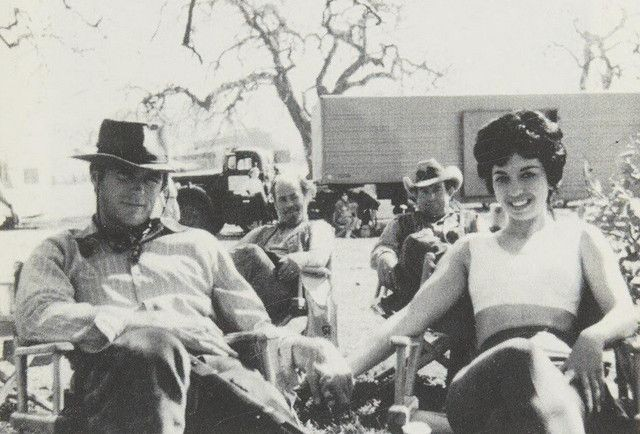
Clint Eastwood with stuntwoman Roxanne Tunis; Paul Brinegar and Rocky Shahan in background

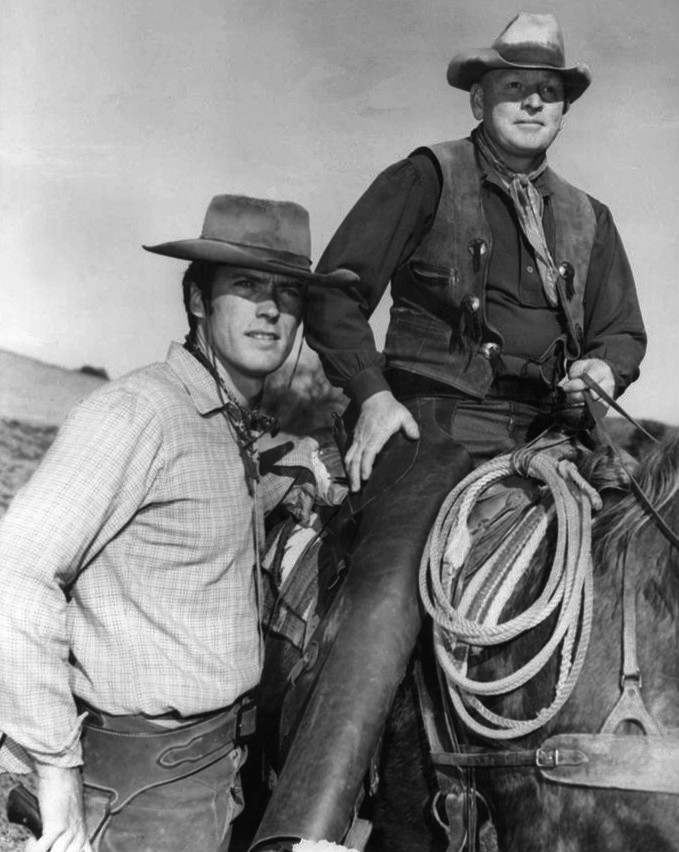
Eastwood and Don Hight (1962)

Series producer Charles Marquis Warren based Rawhide on three sources:

- Cattle Empire is the movie that he directed in 1958 and for which Endre Bohem was a screenwriter and Paul Brinegar, Steve Raines, Rocky Shahan, and Charles H. Gray were actors; all also worked in Rawhide.
- Chisholm Trail is the classic novel by Borden Chase that inspired the epic motion picture Red River starring John Wayne and Montgomery Clift.
- The diary of trail boss George C. Duffield was written during a cattle drive from San Antonio to Sedalia in 1866. The narrations with which Gil Favor begins each episode are similar in style and breadth to the entries in Duffield's journal, lending the show an extra measure of authenticity.

Filming for the first season of Rawhide took place at Universal-International Studios in Hollywood. The extensive railroad scenes in the third season were filmed in one month on the Sierra Railroad in Tuolumne County, California.

The premiere episode of Rawhide reached the top 20 in the Nielsen ratings.

The show had a grueling production schedule, being mostly weekly with a three- to four-month break between seasons. After the first season of 22 episodes, seasons two to seven were each 30 episodes. Often, the only way the lead actors could get a break was if their character was said to be off on business. On rare occasions, the show featured a smaller number of the actors and some misfortune, maybe in a town, which would give the others time off.

=== Theme song ===
The theme song's lyrics were written by Ned Washington in 1958. It was composed by Dimitri Tiomkin and sung by pop singer Frankie Laine, with the orchestra and chorus conducted by John Williams (credited as Johnny Williams). The theme song became very popular, and was covered several times and featured in movies such as The Blues Brothers and Shrek 2.

=== Title sequence ===
The eighth and final season's title sequence was animated by Ken Mundie of DePatie-Freleng Enterprises.

== Release ==
=== Home media ===
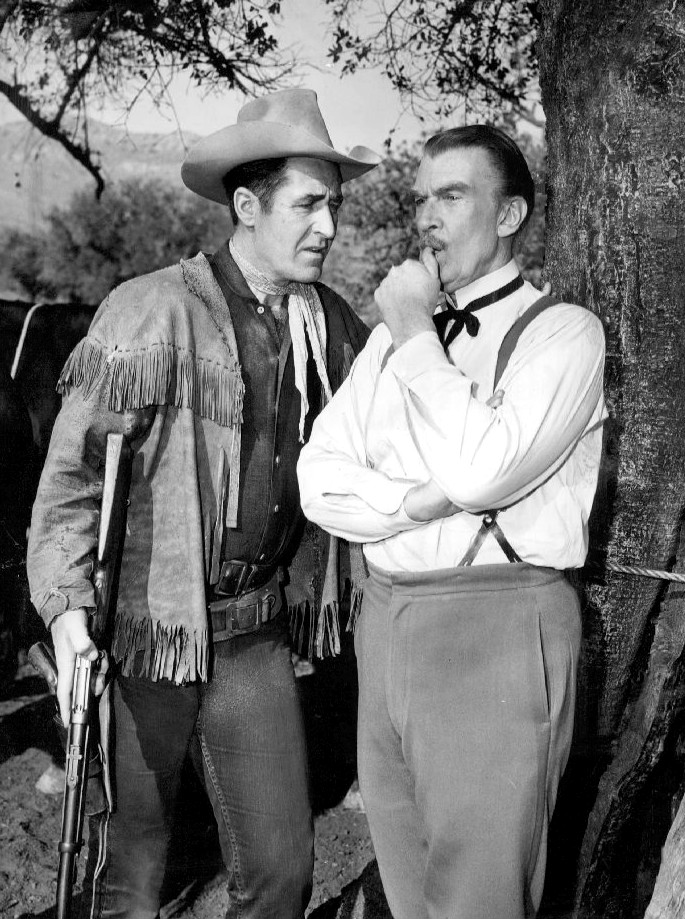
Sheb Wooley and Walter Pidgeon

CBS DVD (distributed by Paramount) has released all eight seasons of Rawhide on DVD in Region 1.

On May 12, 2015, CBS DVD released Rawhide- The Complete Series on DVD in Region 1.

In Region 2, Rawhide has been released in Scandinavia: Season 1, by Noble Entertainment, two boxes, 2009–2010, season one re-releasing in January 2014 by Soulmedia, seasons 2 and 3, by Soulmedia (season 2 in two boxes, and season 3 in four boxes). No more seasons will be released in Scandinavia.

Revelation Films has released the first three seasons on DVD in the UK. Season 4 will be released on March 23, 2015, followed by season 5 on June 22, 2015. They are released as complete season sets rather than two volumes.

In Region 4, Madman Entertainment has released all eight seasons on DVD in Australia, with each season in one box. Season 8, the Final Season, was released on October 5, 2011. DVD releases play heavily on Clint Eastwood's later fame, depicting him in the foreground as the chief character and crediting: "Clint Eastwood in...", but the original show credits for seasons one to seven actually depict the late Eric Fleming (as Gil Favor) being the lead cast member, with Eastwood as co-star (excepting a few later episodes where Eastwood is the sole star).

DVD name	Ep No.	Region 1	Region 2 (UK)	Region 2 (Scandinavia)	Region 4
Season 1	22	July 25, 2006	November 15, 2010	October 28, 2009 January 13, 2010	January 20, 2010
Season 2, Volume 1	16	May 29, 2007	April 11, 2011	September 22, 2010	March 9, 2010
Season 2, Volume 2	16	December 18, 2007	April 11, 2011	September 22, 2010	March 9, 2010
Season 3, Volume 1	15	May 27, 2008	July 11, 2011	September 28, 2011 January 11, 2012	August 11, 2010
Season 3, Volume 2	15	December 9, 2008	July 11, 2011	February 15, 2012 August 29, 2012	August 11, 2010
Season 4, Volume 1	15	June 7, 2011	June 6, 2016	Seasons 4–8, not to be released	September 27, 2010
Season 4, Volume 2	15	November 1, 2011	June 6, 2016	Seasons 4–8, not to be released	September 27, 2010
Season 5, Volume 1	15	September 18, 2012	September 5, 2016	Seasons 4–8, not to be released	February 2, 2011
Season 5, Volume 2	14	September 18, 2012	September 5, 2016	Seasons 4–8, not to be released	February 2, 2011
Season 6, Volume 1	16	June 4, 2013	TBA	Seasons 4–8, not to be released	May 2, 2011
Season 6, Volume 2	15	June 4, 2013	TBA	Seasons 4–8, not to be released	May 2, 2011
Season 7, Volume 1	15	March 4, 2014	TBA	Seasons 4–8, not to be released	August 3, 2011
Season 7, Volume 2	15	March 4, 2014	TBA	Seasons 4–8, not to be released	August 3, 2011
Season 8	13	June 3, 2014		Seasons 4–8, not to be released	October 5, 2011
The Complete Series	217	May 12, 2015			

On the Region 1 DVD sets, the episode "Incident of the Roman Candles" is included on both the Season One DVD set and the Season Two Volume One DVD set. Similarly, the episode "Abilene" is included on both the Season Four Volume Two DVD set and the Season Five Volume Two DVD set.

== Response ==
=== Nielsen Ratings ===
Season	Time slot (ET)	Rank	Rating
1958–59	Friday at 8:00 pm (Episodes 1–15); Friday at 7:30 pm (Episodes 16–23)	28	25.9
1959–60	Friday at 7:30 pm	18	25.8
1960–61	Friday at 7:30 pm	6	27.5
1961–62	Friday at 7:30 pm	13	24.5
1962–63	Friday at 7:30 pm	22	22.8
1963–64	Thursday at 8:00 pm	Not in the Top 30	
1964–65	Friday at 7:30 pm	Not in the Top 30	
1965–66	Friday at 7:30 pm (Episode 1); Tuesday at 7:30 pm (Episodes 2–12)	Not in the Top 30	

== Adaptations ==
=== Books ===
In 1961, Signet Books published a paperback original novel called Rawhide by Frank C. Robertson based upon the television show. Eric Fleming as Gil Favor and Clint Eastwood as Rowdy Yates are both on the front cover of the book. The book follows Favor, Yates, Wishbone, and others as they try to get their herd to Sedalia ahead of a rival's herd. The book was published multiple times with the last run printed in 1986.

=== Comics ===
The TV show was also adapted into a comic book by Dan Spiegle, distributed by Dell Comics.
