= Steve Raines =

American actor

- Born: June 17, 1916; Grants Pass, Oregon, U. S.
- Died: January 4, 1996 (aged 79); Grants Pass, Oregon, U. S.
- Occupation: Actor
- Years active: 1947–1974

Steve Raines (June 17, 1916 – January 4, 1996) was an American television and film actor. He appeared in many TV Western series.

== Early years ==
Born in 1916 in Grants Pass, Oregon, Raines was adopted by Mr. and Mrs. Henry Savage of San Antonio, Texas. The Savages operated a riding stable located across from the orphanage where Raines resided. He frequently visited the stable and was eventually adopted by the Savages.

== Career ==
In 1947 Raines began acting and being a stuntman in films. His first film was Along the Oregon Trail (1947). His work included being a double for Alan Ladd in Shane (1953).

Raines appeared in many television series and several films, including Naked Gun (1956), Street of Darkness (1958), and Macho Callahan (1970).

He and Savage performed in some "B" movies with Henry Garcia a local actor. After a while, he decided he would go to California to be in the movies and the rest is below.

Raines participated in bulldogging and bronco riding in rodeos in the United States and South America. He also worked as a stuntman in Hollywood and as a guide for hunters. He was in the US military during World War II.

Raines played Jim Quince in the CBS western series, Rawhide (1959–1965). Raines was featured in the episode, Judgement at Hondo Seco. From the 1950s to the 1970s, he guest-starred in The Adventures of Kit Carson, Brave Eagle, Maverick, The Life and Legend of Wyatt Earp, Laredo, and The High Chaparral.

His last appearance was in a 1974 episode of CBS's Gunsmoke, starring James Arness.

== Death ==
Raines died in Grants Pass, Oregon, of a stroke on January 4, 1996, aged 79.

== Filmography ==
Film
Year	Title	Role	Notes
1947	Along the Oregon Trail	Henchman Steve	Uncredited
1947	Colorado Skies	Henchman Pony	
1948	Oklahoma Badlands	Henchman	Uncredited
1948	Sundown in Santa Fe	Henchman	Uncredited
1948	Frontier Revenge	1st Dawson Brother	Uncredited
1949	Sheriff of Wichita	Will - Henchman	
1949	Son of a Bad Man	Henchman Larson	
1951	Border Fence	Steve Patterson	
1953	Shane	Ryker Man	Uncredited
1954	Drums Across the River		Uncredited
1954	Broken Lance	Cowboy	Uncredited
1955	Count Three and Pray	Jake Miller	Uncredited
1956	Reprisal!	Minor Role	Uncredited
1956	Naked Gun	Stevens	
1958	Cattle Empire	Paul Corbo	Uncredited
1958	Street of Darkness	Flakey	
1958	Frontier Gun	Vince	Uncredited
1967	Mosby's Marauders	Sgt. Maddux	
1969	Ride a Northbound Horse	Cowboy	
1970	Macho Callahan	Bartender	
Television
Year	Title	Role	Notes
1955	The Gene Autry Show	Henchman Pete Crowder	1 episode
1952-1956	The Roy Rogers Show	Henchman Sam Thatcher / Dan Price / Henchman Slim	6 episodes
1959-1965	Rawhide	Jim Quince	215 episodes
1966	Laredo	Frank / Stage Driver	2 episodes
1966	Daniel Boone	Horseman	1 episode
1967	Disneyland	Sgt. Maddux	1 episode
1966-1968	Bonanza	Deputy Sheriff / Darrel Brightman	2 episodes
1969	The Wild Wild West	Ben	1 episode
1966-1971	The Virginian	Carlson / Charley Kroeger / Morgan Oliver / Winky	4 episodes
1959-1974	Gunsmoke	Driver / Pete / Ed Reilly / 1st Cowboy / Steve	14 episodes, (final appearance)
