= Louis Vittes =

American screenwriter (1911–1969)

Louis Vittes (1911–1969) was an American screenwriter who mostly wrote for television and low-budget films.

== Select filmography ==
- Villa!! (1958)
- Showdown at Boot Hill (1959)
- I Married a Monster from Outer Space (1959)
- The Eyes of Annie Jones (1964)
