= Endre Bohem =

American film producer

- Born: Endre Gordon Boehme; May 1, 1901; Arad, Hungary
- Died: May 5, 1990 (aged 89); Los Angeles, California, United States
- Occupations: Screenwriter; producer
- Spouse: Hilda Bohem
- Children: Leslie Bohem

Endre Bohem (May 1, 1901 – May 5, 1990) was a Hungarian American screenwriter, film producer and television writer.

Bohem is best known for such films and television series as Twenty Bucks, The Boys of Paul Street, Monster from Green Hell and the television series Rawhide. He died on May 5, 1990 (a few days after his 89th birthday).
