= Rocky Shahan =

American actor and stuntman

- Born: Robert Ray Shahan; March 4, 1919; Corinth, Texas, U.S.
- Died: December 8, 1981 (aged 62); Denton, Texas, U.S.
- Occupations: Actor, stuntman
- Years active: 1947–1969

Rocky Shahan (March 4, 1919 – December 8, 1981) was an American actor and stuntman. He was a regular cast member of Rawhide. In 1957, he had a speaking part as Dodge’s stagecoach driver “Hank” in the ending of an episode of Gunsmoke (“Jesse”-S3E6).

== Selected filmography ==
Year	Title	Role	Notes
1947	Son of Zorro	Stagecoach Driver	
1949	Roll, Thunder, Roll!	Henchman	
1952	Wyoming Roundup	Stagecoach driver	
1952	The Lusty Men	Cowboy at Knife Fight	
1954	Phantom Stallion	Henchman	
1957	Ride a Violent Mile	Outlaw	
1958	Cattle Empire	Dan Quince	
1958	Blood Arrow	Taslatch	

== Selected television ==
Year	Title	Role	Notes
1961	Death Valley Days	Joe - Stage Driver	Episode "Appointment in Cascabel"
1957	Have Gun - Will Travel	Stage Driver	Episode "Winchester Quarantine"
1957	Gunsmoke	Jim - Stage Driver	Episode "Pucket's New Year"
1957	Have Gun - Will Travel	Stage Driver	Episode "Strange Vendetta"
1957	Gunsmoke	Hank - Stage Driver	Episode "Jesse"
1957	Have Gun - Will Travel	Gang Member	Episode "The Teacher"
1960	The Adventures of Ozzie and Harriet	Personnel Manager	Episode "Girl in the Emporium"
1959-1965	Rawhide	Joe Scarlet	Cast Regular
1964	Gunsmoke	Stage Driver	Episode "Jonah Hutchinson"
1964	Gunsmoke	Stage Driver	Episode "Chicken"
1969	The Guns of Will Sonnett	Stage Driver	Episode "The Trial"
