= James Murdock (actor) =

American film and television actor

- James Murdock in Rawhide
- Born: David Lee Baker; June 22, 1931; Normal, Illinois, U.S.
- Died: December 24, 1981 (aged 50); Calabasas, California, U.S.
- Occupations: Film and television actor
- Years active: 1958–1974
- Spouse: Julie Harris
- Children: 2

David Lee Baker (June 22, 1931 – December 24, 1981) was an American film and television actor. He was known for playing Mushy in the American western television series Rawhide.

== Life and career ==
Murdock was born in Normal, Illinois, the son of Faye Baker. He reportedly used the surname "Murdock" because he thought it sounded tougher and would help him get roles. He began his acting career in 1958 playing a young outlaw in the Western television series Have Gun, Will Travel. In 1959, he joined the cast of the new CBS Western television series Rawhide playing the assistant cook Mushy. Murdock made a guest appearance in a 1966 episode of the Western television series Gunsmoke.

Murdock had some small roles in films under the name David Baker, including Some of My Best Friends Are... in 1971 and Airport 1975 and The Godfather Part II in 1974.

== Death ==
Murdock died on December 24, 1981, of lung cancer in Calabasas, California, at the age of 50. He was buried in Cypress Lawn Memorial Park.

== Filmography ==
Year	Title	Role	Notes
1959-1965	Rawhide	Harkness 'Mushy' Mushgrove III	TV Series, 201 episodes
1971	Some of My Best Friends Are...	Clint	
1973	Airport 1975	Rev. Bob Herron - Passenger	Uncredited
1974	The Godfather Part II	F.B.I. Man #2	
