= 11th British Academy Film Awards =

1958 film awards ceremony

- Date: 6 March 1958

Highlights
- Best Film: The Bridge on the River Kwai
- Best British Film: The Bridge on the River Kwai
- Most awards: The Bridge on the River Kwai (4)
- Most nominations: The Prince and the Showgirl (5)

The 11th British Academy Film Awards, given by the British Academy of Film and Television Arts, were held on 6 March 1958, to honor the best national and foreign films of 1957.

== Winners and nominees ==
=== Best Film ===
The Bridge on the River Kwai

- 12 Angry Men
- 3:10 to Yuma
- The Bachelor Party
- Edge of the City
- The Shiralee
- That Night!
- The Tin Star
- Windom's Way
- Paths of Glory
- Pather Panchali
- Celui qui doit mourir
- Heaven Knows, Mr. Allison
- Porte des Lilas
- The Prince and the Showgirl
- A Man Escaped or: The Wind Bloweth Where It Listeth

=== Best British Film ===
The Bridge on the River Kwai

- The Prince and the Showgirl
- The Shiralee
- Windom's Way

=== Best Foreign Actor ===
Henry Fonda in 12 Angry Men

- Sidney Poitier in Edge of the City
- Ed Wynn in The Great Man
- Robert Mitchum in Heaven Knows, Mr. Allison
- Pierre Brasseur in Porte des Lilas
- Tony Curtis in Sweet Smell of Success
- Richard Basehart in Time Limit
- Jean Gabin in La Traversee de Paris

=== Best British Actor ===
Alec Guinness in The Bridge on the River Kwai

- Trevor Howard in Manuela
- Laurence Olivier in The Prince and the Showgirl
- Michael Redgrave in Time Without Pity
- Peter Finch in Windom's Way

=== Best British Actress ===
Heather Sears in The Story of Esther Costello

- Deborah Kerr in Tea and Sympathy
- Sylvia Syms in Woman in a Dressing Gown

=== Best Foreign Actress ===
Simone Signoret in Les Sorcieres de Salem

- Katharine Hepburn in The Rainmaker
- Joanne Woodward in The Three Faces of Eve
- Augusta Dabney in That Night!
- Eva Marie Saint in A Hatful of Rain
- Marilyn Monroe in The Prince and the Showgirl
- Lilli Palmer in Anastasia - Die letzte Zarentochter

=== Best British Screenplay ===
The Bridge on the River Kwai - Pierre Boulle
