= Banjo Eyes =

1941 musical

- Page from souvenir program
- Music: Vernon Duke
- Lyrics: John La Touche; Harold Adamson
- Book: Joseph Quinlan; Izzy Elinson
- Productions: 1941 Broadway

Banjo Eyes is a musical based on the play Three Men on a Horse by John Cecil Holm and George Abbott. It has a book by Joseph Quinlan and Izzy Ellinson, music by Vernon Duke, and lyrics by John La Touche and Harold Adamson.

Produced by Albert Lewis and staged by Hassard Short, the Broadway production opened on December 25, 1941, at the Hollywood Theatre, where it ran for 126 performances. The cast included Eddie Cantor, Lionel Stander, William Johnson, and, in a small role, future novelist Jacqueline Susann (Valley of the Dolls).

Although Cantor was known as "Banjo Eyes," the title referred not to his character but to a talking race horse, played in costume by the vaudeville team of Morton and Mayo. In dream sequences, Banjo Eyes would give Cantor's character tips on which horses were going to win different races, but warned him his supposed talent for picking the winners would vanish if he ever placed a bet himself. The book was a very loose adaptation of its source, and the World War II anthem "We Did It Before (And We Can Do It Again)" by Charles Tobias and Cliff Friend was interpolated into the score for no apparent reason other than to stir up patriotism among audience members. Cantor closed the show by singing a medley of his hits in his customary blackface. The show closed when its star suffered a medical emergency.

== Song list ==
Act I

- Birthday Card
- Valentine's Day Card
- Easter Greetings
- Merry Christmas
- Mother's Day
- I'll Take the City
- The Toast of the Boys at the Post (music and lyrics by George Sumner)
- I’ve Got to Hand It to You
- A Nickel to My Name
- Who Started the Rhumba?
- It Could Only Happen in the Movies

Act II

- Make with the Feet
- We’re Having a Baby
- Banjo Eyes
- The Yanks Are on the March Again
- Not a Care in the World
- We Did It Before (And We Can Do It Again)
