= Anatomy of a Psycho =

1961 film

- Film poster
- Directed by: Boris Petroff (as Brooke L. Peters)
- Screenplay by: Jane Mann; Don Devlin
- Story by: Jane Mann; Edward D. Wood, Jr. (as Larry Lee)
- Produced by: Boris Petroff (producer)
- Starring: See below
- Cinematography: Joel Colman
- Edited by: Ed Spiegel
- Music by: Michael Terr
- Production company: Alexander Film Company
- Distributed by: Unitel
- Release date: 14 June 1961
- Running time: 75 minutes
- Country: United States
- Language: English

Anatomy of a Psycho is a 1961 American crime thriller film directed by Boris Petroff (as Brooke L. Peters). Ed Wood reportedly contributed to Jane Mann's screenplay as Larry Lee. Ronnie Burns, adopted son of George Burns and Gracie Allen, plays the romantic lead. The film was shot at the Alexander Film Company studios in Colorado Springs in 1959. It was the only feature film produced by the company. The film had the working title of Young Scarface; by the time film the film received a distributor it was retitled to exploit Anatomy of a Murder (1959) and Psycho (1960).

Co-screenwriter Don Devlin who played Moe was the father of producer Dean Devlin, Jane Mann was the wife of Boris Petroff.

== Premise ==
Duke Marco has raised his kid brother Chet and his sister like a father. When Duke is sentenced to death after a trial for murder, Chet increasingly experiences paranoia and psychosis, which not even his sister, best friend or girlfriend can relieve. Ultimately losing touch with surrounding reality, he assaults the son of the prosecuting attorney, beats up the judge's son and sets his house on fire then attempts to get the son of the judge on a murder charge. However, Lieutenant Mac, a local police officer, discovers Chet's involvement and hunts him down, leading to a tragic denouement.

== Cast ==
- Ronnie Burns as Mickey
- Pamela Lincoln as Pat
- Darrell Howe as Chet
- Judy Howard as Sandy
- Michael Granger as Lt. Mac
- Frank Killmond as Bobbie
- Russ Bender as Frank
- Don Devlin as Moe
- William Salzwedel as Duke
- Robert Stabler as Defense Attorney
- John B. Lee as District Attorney
- Pat McMahon as Arthur (uncredited)

== Soundtrack ==
The film uses public domain music originally used for Wood's Plan 9 from Outer Space (1959).

Title Psycho Darrel Howe sung two songs in the film Gonna Go Round and I Make a Wish, with the 45 record crediting Young Scarface.

== DVD release ==
The film was released on DVD in 2001.

== See also ==
- Ed Wood filmography
