= John Newland =

American actor (1917–2000)

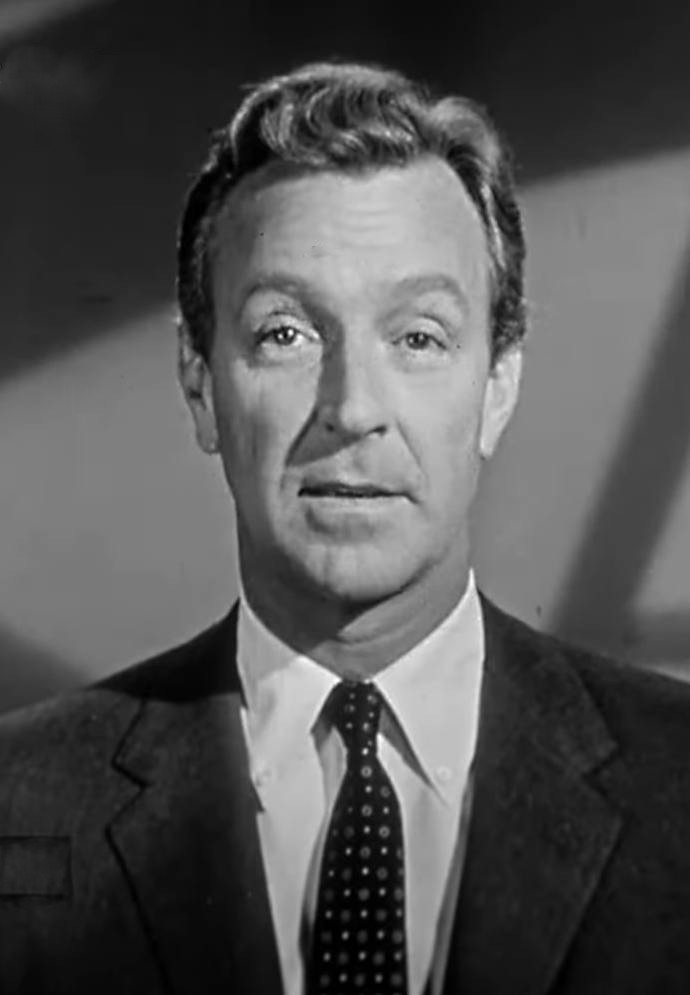
- Newland in 1959
- Born: November 23, 1917; Cincinnati, Ohio, U.S.
- Died: January 10, 2000 (aged 82); Los Angeles, California, U.S.
- Occupations: Director; actor; television producer; screenwriter
- Spouses: Helena De Castro-Palomino Suárez (m. 1964) Areta Farrell (m. 1967)
- Children: 2 (second marriage)

John Newland (November 23, 1917 – January 10, 2000) was an American film director, actor, television producer, and screenwriter.

== Early life and career ==
Born in Cincinnati, Ohio, Newland was the son of Mr. and Mrs. Robert Newland, a couple who managed small hotels in the Greater Cincinnati area. He was educated at Mt. Auburn Elementary School and Walnut Hills High School.

Newland began his career while still in his teens as an apprentice with the Stuart Walker Stock Company. He also performed in vaudeville with the Vikings song-and-dance act.

He moved to New York City to study acting, and there he performed in theaters with Milton Berle. He went on to tour in vaudeville houses around the United States.

Newland served in the United States Army Air Corps during World War II. After the war, he signed with Warner Bros. but was limited to playing bit parts. His film debut came in Adventures of Dusty Bates (1946). By the early 1950s, Newland began to focus solely on television roles, appearing in several episodes of Studio One, The Philco Television Playhouse, Tales of Tomorrow, Kraft Television Theatre, Robert Montgomery Presents and Schlitz Playhouse of Stars.

After directing episodes of Letter to Loretta in 1953, Newland went on to direct two episodes of Bachelor Father, Alfred Hitchcock Presents, and Thriller (US TV series).

His feature film directorial debut That Night! (1957) was nominated for two British Academy Film Awards.

In 1959, Newland became the host and director of the paranormal television series One Step Beyond. The series ended its run in 1961 and Newland later hosted its short-lived counterpart The Next Step Beyond in 1978.

Following the demise of his One Step Beyond, Newland directed one of the early 1964 The Man from U.N.C.L.E. episodes called "The Double Affair." His episode was given additional footage and released to cinemas as a motion picture titled The Spy with My Face. In 1966 he produced and directed all episodes but one of the serious spy series The Man Who Never Was for which he also served as a writer. Some episodes were strung together and released outside the United States as a film called Danger Has Two Faces. He later directed episodes of The Sixth Sense and Police Woman. In addition to acting, directing, and screenwriting, he produced several television movies and directed the 1967 Star Trek episode "Errand of Mercy."

== Death ==
On January 10, 2000, Newland died of a stroke in Los Angeles, age 82.

== Select filmography ==
=== Director ===
- That Night! (1957)
- The Thin Man (1 episode, 1958)
- Bachelor Father (5 episodes, 1958–1959)
- One Step Beyond (74 episodes, 1959–1961), also host
- Checkmate (1 episode, 1961)
- Thriller (4 episodes, 1961–1962)
- Route 66 (1 episode, 1962)
- Naked City (1 episode, 1962)
- The Defenders (1 episode, 1962)
- The Nurses (1 episode, 1963)
- The Man from U.N.C.L.E. (1 episode, 1964)
- The Man Who Never Was (TV series) (17 episodes 1966–1967)
- Star Trek (1 episode, 1967)
- Daniel Boone (3 episodes, 1967–1969)
- Hawaii Five-O (1 episode, 1970)
- The Name of the Game (1 episode, 1970)
- My Lover My Son (1970)
- The Legend of Hillbilly John (1972)
- Night Gallery (1 episode, 1972)
- The Sixth Sense (3 episodes, 1972)
- Don't be Afraid of the Dark (1973)
- Harry O (4 episodes, 1974–1975)
- Matt Helm (1 episode, 1975)
- Police Woman (13 episodes, 1974–1978)
- The Next Step Beyond (17 episodes, 1978–1979), also host.
- Wonder Woman (3 episodes, 1979)
- Flamingo Road (1 episode, 1981)
- Whiz Kids (1 episode, 1983)

=== Actor ===
- Gentleman's Agreement (Uncredited, 1947)
- Nora Prentiss (Uncredited, 1947)
- 13 Lead Soldiers (1948)
- Kraft Television Theatre (11 episodes, 1949–1953)
- Studio One (2 episodes, 1950–1951)
- Lights Out (4 episodes, 1950–1952)
- The Philco Television Playhouse (7 episodes, 1950–1952)
- The Web (3 episodes, 1950–1953)
- Armstrong Circle Theatre (3 episodes, 1951–1952)
- Lux Video Theatre (1 episode, 1952)
- Tales of Tomorrow (2 episodes, 1952–1953)
- Robert Montgomery Presents (36 episodes, 1952–1957)
- Schlitz Playhouse of Stars (5 episodes, 1953–1956)
- Letter to Loretta (13 episodes, 1956–1960)
- General Electric Theater (1 episode, 1958)
- The Detectives Starring Robert Taylor (1 episode, 1959)
- Thriller (Return of Andrew Bentley, 12–11–1961)
- Dr. Kildare (2 episodes, 1964)
- Night Gallery (1 episode, 1972)

=== Producer ===
- The Deadly Hunt (1971)
- Angel City (1980)
- The Five of Me (1981)
- The Execution (1985)
- Arch of Triumph (1985)
- Timestalkers (1987)
- Too Good to Be True (1988)

== Award nominations ==
Year	Award	Result	Category
1953	Emmy Award	Nominated	Best Actor
