= Derry Quinn =

English screenwriter (1918–1987)

- Born: 1918; London, UK
- Died: 1987 (aged 68–69); London, UK
- Occupations: Screenwriter, novelist
- Writing career
- Genre: Thriller fiction

Derry Quinn (1918–1987) was an English film and television screenwriter and novelist. His most famous work is as a co-author of the screenplay for the MGM's film Operation Crossbow.

== Life ==
Dermot Edward Quinn made his first film at the age of sixteen, and at seventeen directed and photographed a documentary film about bottling whisky. A year later he went to Munich to take a course at a photographic school. During World War II he was commissioned to carry out specialised photographic work for the intelligence services in the Middle East.

After the War Quinn worked for a short time in his family business while writing film stories on the side. His work attracted the attention of the Rank Organisation in 1949, when he left the family firm to become a full-time scriptwriter. After a year with Rank he joined the Douglas Fairbanks Company, where he became assistant story editor and later story editor helping to turn some eighty television films as well. He also worked for the British Picture Corporation and Metro-Goldwyn-Mayer, for whom he co-scripted the spy thriller Operation Crossbow together with Emeric Pressburger and Ray Rigby, and scripted several documentaries.

In 1973, Quinn partially quit screenwriting and moved to the South of France with his wife and son to pursue a career as a novelist. In the following years he published three thrillers. Despite lukewarm reviews, the first and the last were dramatised as part of Thames Television's suspense series Armchair Thriller, in 1978 and 1980 respectively.

== Work ==
=== Television credits ===
- Douglas Fairbanks Presents
- The Pursuers
- One Step Beyond
- Paul Temple
- Armchair Thriller

=== Film credits ===
- Rag Doll (1961)
- Operation Crossbow (1965)
- The Trygon Factor (1966; adapted from Edgar Wallace's novel)
- Cry Wolf (1969)

=== Novels ===
- The Limbo Connection (1977)
- The Solstice Man (1978)
- The Fear of God (1978)
