= 13 Lead Soldiers =

1948 film by Frank McDonald

- Film poster
- Directed by: Frank McDonald
- Written by: Irving Elman; Dwight V. Babcock
- Based on: Bulldog Drummond series by Herman C. McNeile
- Produced by: Bernard Small; Ben Pivar
- Starring: Tom Conway; Maria Palmer; Helen Westcott; John Newland
- Cinematography: George Robinson
- Edited by: Saul A. Goodkind
- Music by: Milton Rosen
- Production company: Reliance Pictures
- Distributed by: Twentieth Century Fox
- Release date: 30 April 1948
- Running time: 64 minutes
- Country: United States
- Language: English
- Budget: $150,000
- Box office: $400,000 (worldwide)

13 Lead Soldiers is a 1948 American mystery film directed by Frank McDonald and starring Tom Conway, Maria Palmer and Helen Westcott. Conway plays Captain Hugh 'Bulldog' Drummond, a role he also played in The Challenge another Twentieth Century Fox release the same year.

== Plot ==
Dr Stedman is murdered by an intruder in his study and two toy soldiers are stolen from his desk. The next day, Hugh Drummond reads about the murder in the newspaper. He is approached by a friend, Phillip Coleman, who tells him that he owns two similar figures and that he has received first offers, then threats to sell them. According to Coleman, the soldiers are 900 years old, dating back to the time of William the Conqueror. Coleman leaves the two painted lead figures with Drummond for safety and asks him to look into the affair. To flush out whoever is trying to get the figurines they plant a press story that Drummond has bought them from Coleman.

When a woman, who introduces herself as journalist Estelle Gorday, visits Drummond's apartment, she recognizes the right figures out of a collection that Drummond has assembled on his mantle piece. Drummond and his friend Longworth then visit Stedman Manor and meet the daughter of the victim, Cynthia. She tells them that her father's figures were very similar to those brought by Drummond but different in detail and that they were part of a set of 13 soldiers that Dr Stedman bought at auction together with an Anglo-Saxon palimpsest. He was translating that when he was killed and the scroll was also taken. Dr Stedman was convinced that the statues were exceedingly valuable and he received an offer to buy them from a man called Vane. Vane offered a multiple of what Stedman has paid and left very angry when rejected.

Drummond and Longworth follow an invitation by Ms Gorday. While they are there, Vane breaks into Drummond's apartment and steals the two soldiers. Coleman and Seymour, another friend of Drummond's, shadow him to a Soho flat. Seymour fetches Drummond and they return to Soho. Drummond and Longworth go up. A knife is thrown at them and they find Vane dead and the soldiers missing. The next day, Drummond and his friends are at Inspector McIver's office when Ms Stedman identifies the dead man as Vane. Drummond visits Gorday and tells her that he smelled her perfume at the Soho flat. He searches her place and finds the palimpsest. She admits to working for Vane, who was a collector who owned the other soldiers.

Drummond next shows the palimpsest to Ms Stedman in the presence of Coleman. He tells them that he has done research on the soldiers: the figurines show the 13 last leaders of the Anglo-Saxons before the Norman Conquest. Before being defeated, King Harold hid his treasure at a manor near London and had the parchment with a map and instructions written, whilst the figures served as the cipher/key to find the hiding place. After the battle of Hastings, the soldiers were dispersed. Monks overwrote the parchment and the original writing was only rediscovered by Dr Stedman.

Drummond, Cynthia Stedman and Coleman go to the spot shown on the map. The current house dates to King George I and is occupied by an antiques store. Inside, they discover a medieval fireplace and walls. When they inquire about the soldiers, the store owner asks them to leave. Later, Ms Gorday visits Drummond and threatens him with a gun, demanding the palimpsest. She admits to being the daughter of the shop keeper, Mr Prager. He owns the other nine soldiers and wants the four others and the palimpsest. Prager and his daughter hired Vane to find them but were horrified when he killed Dr Stedman. She admits to being at Soho and to throwing the knife at Drummond.

Ms Stedman comes to the store with the parchment, shadowed by Seymor and Longworth. They wait outside and meet Ms Gorday/Prager and Drummond when they arrive. Entering, they find Prager dead. Drummond discovers Coleman with all 13 soldiers inside the shop. Coleman attacks but is overpowered. They call the police and find Cynthia, who said Coleman had asked her to come and that she had been hit on the head on arrival. Drummond arranges the soldiers on a pedestal just like in the drawing and their weight distribution opens a secret door. They find the treasure. The arriving McIver takes a figure, causing the stone door to start closing. Coleman tries to flee but is shot and then trapped and crushed by the door. The others manage to leave the secret room when the figure is replaced.

== Cast ==
- Tom Conway as Capt. Hugh 'Bulldog' Drummond
- John Newland as Algernon 'Algy' Longworth
- Maria Palmer as Estelle Prager, alias Estelle Gorday
- Helen Westcott as Cynthia Stedman
- William Stelling as Phillip Coleman
- Terry Kilburn as Seymour
- Gordon Richards as Police Inspector McIver
- Harry Cording as Edward Vane
- John Goldsworthy as Dr. Ashley Stedman

== Bibliography ==
- Backer, Ron. Mystery Movie Series of 1930s Hollywood. McFarland, 2012.
- Mayer, Geoff. Historical Dictionary of Crime Films. Scarecrow Press, 2012.
