= Pamela Lincoln =

American actress (1937–2019)

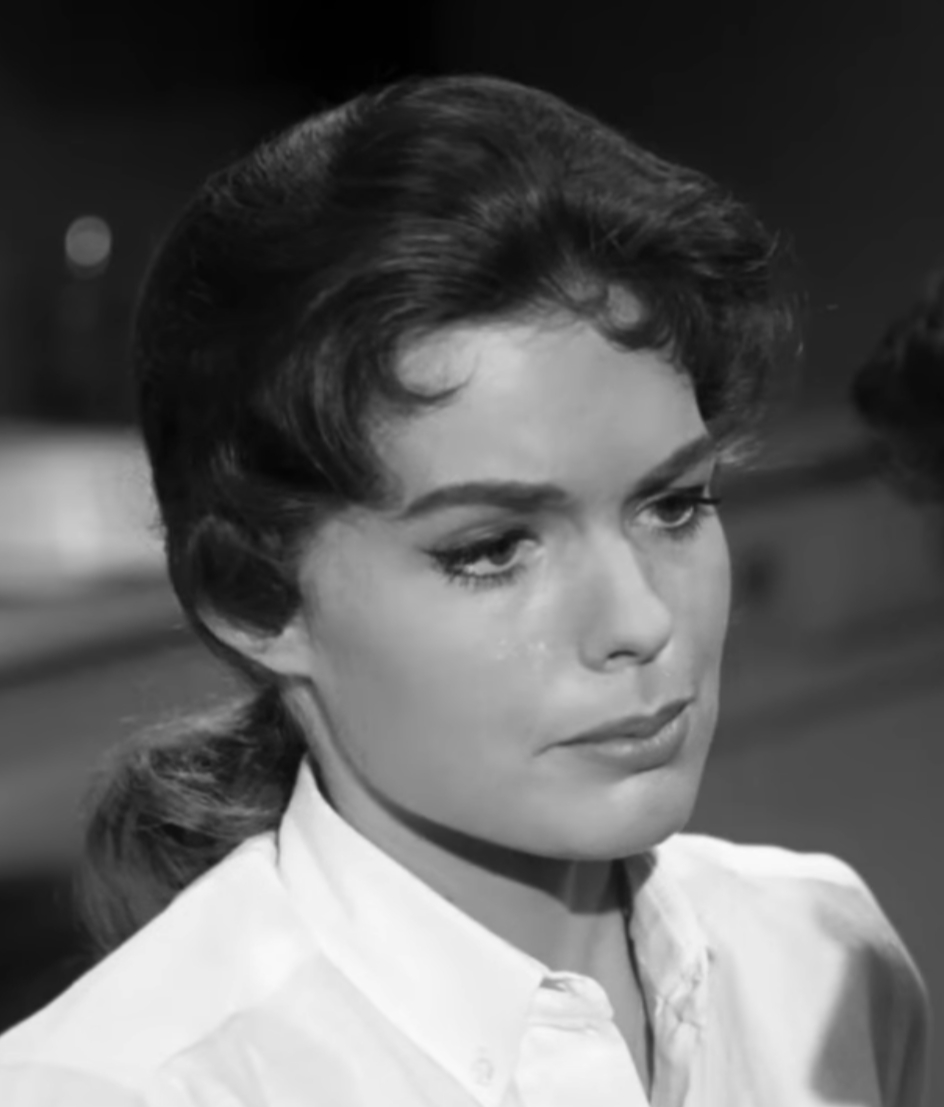
- Lincoln in Anatomy of a Psycho (1961)
- Born: Pamela Gill; June 19, 1937; Los Angeles, California, U.S.
- Died: November 21, 2019 (aged 82); Branford, Connecticut, U.S.
- Occupation: Actress
- Years active: 1959–1984
- Spouse: Darryl Hickman (m. 1959; div. 1982)
- Children: 2
- Mother: Verna Hillie

Pamela Lincoln (born Pamela Gill; June 19, 1937 – November 21, 2019) was an American actress of television and film.

== Career ==
Her best-known movie role is the William Castle film The Tingler, where her screams save the life of Vincent Price, who is being attacked by the bizarre creature. Pamela had contract roles on two daytime soap operas. From 1974 to 1977, in Love of Life, she played the tragic Felicia Fleming Lamont, who was involved with the dashing Eduardo Aleata (played by John Aniston) while married to the older Charles Lamont,

From 1977 to 1979, in The Doctors, she played the scheming Doreen Aldrich, who notoriously kidnapped heroine Carolee Aldrich (her former sister-in-law) when she falsely believed that she was dying of leukemia and decided that she wanted Carolee's husband, Steve. In 1984, Pamela appeared on One Life to Live as Suzanne Allardyce, the widow of the president of a fictional South American country.

== Personal life ==
She was born in Los Angeles, California in June 1937 to actress Verna Hillie and writer Frank Gill Jr. She was married to actor Darryl Hickman in 1959, and had two children with him. They divorced in 1982. Lincoln died in Branford, Connecticut, in November 2019 at the age of 82.

== Filmography ==
Year	Title	Role	Notes
1959	Father Knows Best	Janet Mason	1 episode
1959	One Step Beyond	Older Lisa Garrick	1 episode
1959	Zane Grey Theater	Kitty	1 episode
1959	The Tingler	Lucy Stevens	
1959	Have Gun - Will Travel	Mary - Maid	1 episode
1961	Anatomy of a Psycho	Pat	
1974–1977	Love of Life	Felicia Fleming Lamont	
1977–1979	The Doctors	Doreen Aldrich	
1982	Tootsie	Secretary	(final film role)
1984	One Life to Live	Suzanne Allardyce	3 episodes
