= Boris Petroff =

American film director

Boris Petroff (December 19, 1894 – November 1972) was a film director and producer who specialized in low budget exploitation films. He sometimes used the pseudonym Brooke L. Peters. He included stock footage in some of his films.

Petroff directed Noah's Lark in 1929 and 1930. It featured Morton and Mayo and was modeled after the 1928 film Noah's Ark.

He asked Eddie Cochran to be in his musical comedy film The Girl Can't Help It in 1956. Cochran performed the song "Twenty Flight Rock" in the movie. In 2014, the Museum of Modern Art (MoMA) screened his 1936 film Hats Off.

== Personal life ==
Petroff married Jane Mann, a screenwriter who co-wrote the scripts for The Unearthly and Anatomy of a Psycho. Gloria Petroff, their daughter, was in his films Two Lost Worlds and The Unearthly.

== Filmography ==
=== Director ===
- Hats Off (1936)
- Red Snow (1952) directed by Harry S. Franklin and Boris Petroff
- The Unearthly (1957), produced and directed by Boris Petroff (as Brook L. Peters)
- Outcasts of the City (1958)
- Anatomy of a Psycho (1961)
- Shotgun Wedding (1963)

== Other roles ==
- Arctic Fury (1949), producer
- Two Lost Worlds (1951), producer and co-writer (dba Sterling Productions Inc.)
