= Maria Palmer =

American actress

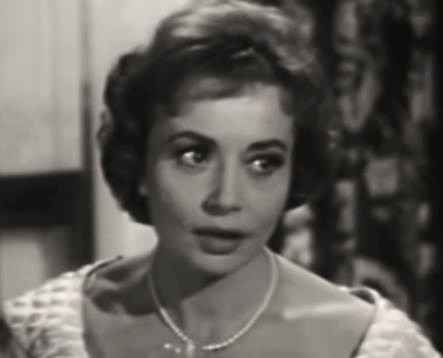
- Palmer in a 1959 episode of the anthology series One Step Beyond
- Born: Maria Pichler; 5 September 1917; Vienna, Austria
- Died: 6 September 1981 (aged 64); Los Angeles, California, U.S.
- Resting place: Forest Lawn Memorial Park (Hollywood Hills)
- Education: Vienna Conservatory
- Occupation: Actress
- Years active: 1923–1967
- Spouse(s): Dr. Franz Marmorek (1933-19??; divorced)

Maria Palmer (born Maria Pichler; 5 September 1917 – 6 September 1981) was an Austrian-born American actress. She appeared on stage as a child actor in various Max Reinhardt productions, then trained as a dancer, joining the Bodenwieser Ensemble. She studied drama and voice at the Vienna Conservatory before emigrating to the United States in 1938 and moving into film, and later television.

== Early life ==
Palmer was born and raised in Vienna, then Austria-Hungary, today Austria, on 5 September 1917. She first appeared on stage as a child actor, in various Max Reinhardt productions. She trained as a dancer, and was a member of the Bodenwieser Ensemble. She later studied drama and voice at the Vienna Conservatory.

== Career ==
In 1938, a year before the outbreak of World War II, Palmer emigrated with her parents to the United States. She first performed on the stage in New York City, most notably in the 1942 production of The Moon Is Down.

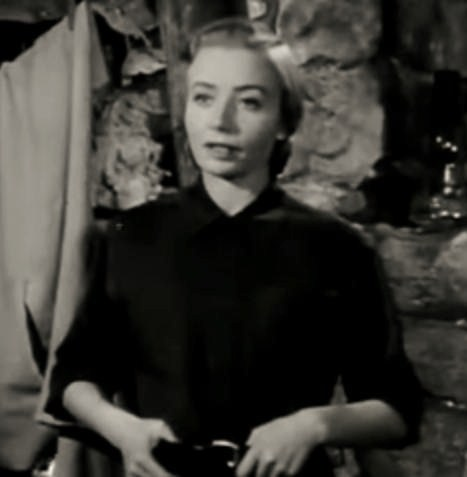
Palmer in Days of Glory (1944)

She moved into film, helping to meet Hollywood's demand for exotic foreign women for war films and films noir. Her debut was playing Catherine de' Medici in the 1942 short Nostradamus and the Queen. Her feature film debut was in Mission to Moscow (1943). She continued in 1944 with Days of Glory, opposite Gregory Peck, and later that year, Lady on a Train.

In the 1950s, her film career declined and she went into radio, television and commercials. She even started her own production company, called Maria Palmer Enterprises. In the early 1960s, Palmer hosted her own Los Angeles show, entitled "Sincerely, Maria Palmer". She appeared as Nora Krasner in the 1963 Perry Mason episode "The Case of Lawful Lazarus" and as murderer Florence Wood in the 1962 episode "The Case of the Borrowed Baby". In her later years, Palmer wrote a number of unproduced television screenplays, often using the pseudonym Eliot Parker White. In 1962, she played "Elsa" in the episode "The Immigrants" on CBS's Rawhide and Marushka Vesterhauzy on the episode "A Bird of Warning" on NBC's Sam Benedict. Her papers, covering the years 1922–1975, are held by the Academy of Motion Picture Arts and Sciences.

== Personal life ==
Palmer married Dr. Franz Marmorek at the age of 16; they later divorced.

== Later life ==
Palmer died of cancer at Cedars-Sinai Medical Center in Los Angeles on 6 September 1981, the day after her 64th birthday. She was buried at Forest Lawn Memorial Park, Hollywood Hills, California.

== Filmography ==
Year	Title	Role	Notes
1923	Rumpelstilzchen	Girl	
1943	Mission to Moscow	Tanya Litvinov	
1944	Days of Glory	Yelena	
1945	Lady on a Train	Margo Martin	
1946	Rendezvous 24	Greta Holvig	
1947	The Other Love	Huberta	
1947	The Web	Martha Kroner	
1948	13 Lead Soldiers	Estelle Prager, alias Estelle Gorday	
1950	Surrender	Janet Barton	
1951	Strictly Dishonorable	Countess Lili Szadvany	
1952	Dangerous Assignment (Season 1, Episode 16) The Caboose Story	Marta Steva	
1953	By the Light of the Silvery Moon	Renee LaRue	
1953	Flight Nurse	Captain Martha Ackerman	
1956	Three for Jamie Dawn	Julia Karek	
1958	Outcasts of the City		
1964	The Evil of Frankenstein	Rena's Mother	(additional sequence: US), Uncredited
