= Operation Crossbow (film) =

1965 film by Michael Anderson

- Theatrical release poster by Frank McCarthy
- Directed by: Michael Anderson
- Screenplay by: Richard Imrie; Derry Quinn; Ray Rigby
- Story by: Duilio Coletti; Vittoriano Petrilli
- Produced by: Carlo Ponti
- Starring: Sophia Loren; George Peppard; Trevor Howard; John Mills; Richard Johnson; Tom Courtenay
- Cinematography: Erwin Hillier
- Edited by: Ernest Walter
- Music by: Ron Goodwin
- Production company: MGM-British Studios
- Distributed by: Metro-Goldwyn-Mayer
- Release dates: 1 April 1965 (United States); 30 August 1965 (United Kingdom)
- Running time: 116 minutes
- Country: United Kingdom
- Languages: English; German
- Box office: $3.7 million (US and Canada rentals)

Operation Crossbow (later re-released as The Great Spy Mission) is a 1965 British spy thriller film directed by Michael Anderson and starring Sophia Loren, George Peppard, Trevor Howard, John Mills, Richard Johnson, and Tom Courtenay. The screenplay was written by Emeric Pressburger (under the pseudonym Richard Imrie), in collaboration with Derry Quinn and Ray Rigby, from a story by Duilio Coletti and Vittoriano Petrilli. It was filmed in Panavision and Metrocolor at MGM-British Studios.

Set during the Second World War, the film is loosely based on an actual series of events, where British bombers targeted the German manufacturing facilities for experimental rocket-bombs. Although it is largely fictional, the film touches on the main aspects of the operation, which was geared to thwart the German long-range weapons programme in the final years of World War II. The story alternates between Nazi Germany's development of the V-1 flying bomb and V-2 rocket, and the efforts of British Intelligence and its agents to counter those threats. All characters speak in the appropriate language, with English subtitles for those speaking German or Dutch.

== Plot ==
In 1943, Nazi Germany is developing the V-1 flying bomb and V-2 rocket. Technical issues with the V-1 lead the Germans to create a crewed version for flight testing, but the test pilots die flying it. Eventually, aviator Hanna Reitsch successfully flies the prototype, and realises that mechanical shifting of the missile's weight and change of speed requires the trim controls to be changed.

Winston Churchill is concerned about a rumoured flying bomb and orders Duncan Sandys, his son-in-law and a minister, to investigate. Sandys is convinced by intelligence and photo-reconnaissance reports that they exist, but scientific advisor Professor Lindemann dismisses the reports. Bomber Command launches a raid on Peenemünde to destroy the rocket complex.

The Germans move production underground to the Mittelwerk factory in Southern Germany and progress to develop the more deadly V-2 rocket. The head of British intelligence learns that engineers are being recruited across occupied Europe and decides to infiltrate the factory. He finds three volunteers, American, Dutch, and British, all experienced engineers who speak fluent German or Dutch. They are hastily trained and sent to Germany, given identities of dead men. Amongst the volunteers interviewed but not selected is a British officer named Bamford, who is later revealed as a German undercover agent.

After the agents parachute into occupied Europe, the British learn that one of them, Robert Henshaw, has been given the identity of a Dutch sailor who is wanted by German police for murder, Jakob Bijus. He is arrested but agrees to act as an informant for the Germans. However, he is recognised by Bamford, who has returned to Germany. Refusing to reveal his mission, Henshaw is shot after refusing to co-operate.

Nora, the wife of the man (Erik van Ostamgen), whom USAAF Lieutenant John Curtis is impersonating, visits the hotel where she believes her husband is staying, to obtain full custody of their children. After Curtis gains her silence with a promise to free her and leaves for the factory, Nora is killed by another agent, Frieda, who was undercover as the hotel check-in lady.

Curtis and Phil Bradley, now impersonating a Dr Engel, infiltrate the underground rocket factory. Bradley is assigned as a porter/cleaner while his papers are checked. Curtis joins the heart of the project, assigned to fix the vibration that is delaying the V-2's development. V-1 flying bombs are shown being launched from their "ski" ramps and falling on London, while others are destroyed by antiaircraft fire, after defensive guns are moved forward to the Kent coast. The more devastating V-2 attacks begin. Launched from undetectable mobile platforms, the only way to fight them is to destroy the factory. The agents learn that the Royal Air Force is mounting a night bombing raid, but the launch doors covering the large A9/A10 "New York rocket" must be opened so that the light provides a visible target. Bradley tries to discover which powerhouse switch opens the doors.

Bamford arrives and reviews the photos of the engineering staff, searching for a familiar face. He recognises no one, and orders all employee records to be checked. The face of the man Curtis is impersonating does not match that taken at the factory, and Bamford realises Curtis is a spy. He sounds the alarm just as the agents are heading for the powerhouse. Bradley is captured, but Curtis, who does not know which switch to pull, makes his way inside, sealing himself in, while holding the staff hostage.

Bamford demands that Curtis surrender, using Bradley as his bargaining chip. As the air-raid sirens sound, Bradley lunges for the microphone and tells Curtis which switch to pull and is shot by Bamford. The powerhouse workers attack Curtis, but he shoots them. One shoots Curtis as he pulls the lever, opening the launch doors. The Germans try to launch the rocket, but as it lifts off, bombs explode, obliterating the facility.

In a final scene, Churchill congratulates Sandys, who observes that the names of the agents will never be known. Churchill adds that without the RAF's courageous raid on Peenemünde, London would have been devastated. He makes Sandys Minister of Works and speaks of rebuilding London.

== Cast ==
- George Peppard as 1st Lt John Curtis
- Trevor Howard as Professor Lindemann
- John Mills as General Boyd
- Sophia Loren as Nora
- Richard Johnson as Duncan Sandys
- Tom Courtenay as Robert Henshaw
- Jeremy Kemp as Phil Bradley
- Anthony Quayle as Bamford
- Lilli Palmer as Frieda
- Paul Henreid as Brig. Gen. Ziemann
- Helmut Dantine as Gruppenführer Linz
- Barbara Rütting as Hanna Reitsch
- Richard Todd as Wing Commander Kendall
- Sylvia Syms as Constance Babington Smith
- John Fraser as Flight Lieutenant Kenny
- Maurice Denham as RAF officer
- John Alderton as RAF officer
- Patrick Wymark as Prime Minister Winston Churchill
- Wolf Frees as German Police Inspector
- Moray Watson as Colonel Kenneth Post
- Richard Wattis as Sir Charles Sims
- Allan Cuthbertson as German technical examiner
- Karel Štěpánek as Professor Hoffer
- George Mikell as German officer
- Ferdy Mayne as German officer
- Anton Diffring as SS Sturmbannfuhrer (uncredited)
- Philip Madoc as German Police Officer (uncredited)

== Production ==
William Douglas-Home, brother of Alec Douglas-Home, wrote an early draft of the screenplay. Sophia Loren and George Peppard were cast early on.

To help increase box-office receipts, Sophia Loren appears, courtesy of her husband and producer of the film, Carlo Ponti. Despite getting lead billing, she has only a modest role, in the hotel sequence. She plays the Italian wife of engineer Erik van Ostamgen, a dead man whose identity has been appropriated by Curtis, Peppard's character. To help her, he forges the signature of her dead husband on a legal document, but she later is killed to maintain secrecy.

Peppard was chosen for his role because of contract difficulties. MGM held his contract and insisted on him being in this film before he gained his release. He signed a new agreement with MGM for which Crossbow was the first, one film a year for three years.

Richard Johnson was under contract to MGM.

Filming began July 1964. Peppard said, "Mikey Anderson is one of those gifted directors who let you play it your own way and only when you see your own rushes do you realise you've been doing it his way all along".

During filming, Anderson said:

I like working in the extremes of either sheer fantasy – that's what made Around the World in 80 Days such a joy – or sheer reality. Crossbow falls into this second class and has given me a wonderful opportunity to dig into the past and into the truth. I researched Crossbow like an FBI man on a murder case, flying to the States, France, Holland, Belgium, Switzerland, and Germany because the story concentrates just as much on the Nazis' efforts to get their V rockets into the air as on the Allies' efforts to bring them down. This isn't going to be one of those films where all the German soldiers are square-headed idiots repeating 'Donner und Blitzen'. The Crossbow mission was a vital mission and had it not come off we might well have all been doing the goosestep now.

The sets were the largest ever built at MGM British studios. Stages 6 and 7 were combined into one large set of 30,000 square feet. Some scenes of the bombing of the factory at the end of the film were later used in Battlestar Galactica to show the inside of the spacecraft burning.

Ponti and the production company worried that the authentic name chosen for the film was confusing and led to a poor initial showing at the box office. This reappraisal led to new names, Code Name: Operation Crossbow and The Great Spy Mission, the name chosen for a re-release in North America. The film was also known as Operazione Crossbow in Italy.

Realistic props and detailed sets added to the look of authenticity in recreating the German secret-weapons projects. The now-defunct St. Pancras and Battersea power stations in London were used as filming locations for the powerhouse scenes.

Parts of Norfolk were used as filming locations, including the town of King's Lynn and the Holkham National Nature Reserve. Also used was the grand staircase at the former Midland Grand Hotel at St Pancras railway station and the river Rijn and skyline of Wijk bij Duurstede (the Netherlands).

=== Dialogue ===
An unusual aspect of Operation Crossbow is that all the German characters, and the disguised Allied characters in their roles, speak (subtitled) German instead of accented English. The same was true of the 1962 film The Longest Day. According to Turner Classic Movies' commentary, actor Paul Henreid argued the German would not work well, and that they should use English with a heavy German accent. Director Michael Anderson insisted on staying with the idea. It did not come across well, though, apparently leading to many of Henreid's scenes being cut.

=== Historical accuracy ===
Some real people were portrayed quite accurately in the film:

- Frederick Lindemann, 1st Viscount Cherwell, universally known as "Prof", served as the British government's leading scientific adviser in the Second World War, when Churchill became prime minister.
- Duncan Sandys was the son-in-law of Winston Churchill. He was injured in a motoring accident in 1941, giving him a permanent limp, as portrayed in the film. Sandys was chairman of a War Cabinet Committee for defence against German flying bombs and rockets. (As minister of defence in 1957, he produced the 1957 Defence White Paper, which proposed a radical shift in the Royal Air Force by ending the development of most fighter aircraft in favour of missile technology.)
- Hanna Reitsch was a well-known German test pilot, who performed such flights with the V-1, though she complained in a later interview that the film "was all technically wrong".
- Constance Babington Smith was a British Women's Auxiliary Air Force officer, who interpreted aerial photographs of Peenemünde.

Conspicuous by his absence from the film is Wernher von Braun, designer and developer of the V-2 rocket, possibly because of the sensitivity of his later role with the US military and NASA, which led to the development of the Saturn V rocket used for the Apollo Moon launches.

== Reception ==
Operation Crossbow opened in the United States on 1 April 1965. The UK premiere was on 20 May 1965 at MGM's Empire Theatre, Leicester Square, London, where it was presented in 70 mm (it was shown only in 35 mm in the US). The film played a total of 19 weeks in three West End cinemas over the next six months, highly unusual at the time for a nonroadshow presentation that had already started its general release (on 29 August). Operation Crossbow was one of the 13 most popular films in the UK in 1965.

The New York Times designated Operation Crossbow a "critic's pick" by film reviewer Bosley Crowther, who wrote that the film "is a beauty that no action-mystery-spy movie fan should miss", "part fact and part fiction", and a "grandly engrossing and exciting melodrama of wartime espionage, done with stunning documentary touches in a tight, tense, heroic story line".Variety reviewers gave a similar evaluation, praising the "suspenseful war melodrama" that boasted ambitious production values, but also commented that "what the Carlo Ponti production lacks primarily is a cohesive story line". A later review by Alun Evans reinforces the more prevalent view that a "starry cast add to the attractive vista, but a tighter script would have been appreciated".

Stanley Kauffmann of The New Republic wrote, "Michael Anderson, a capable director, has made a picture which there is no strenuous reason to see but which, if you do see it, is not boring.

Filmink called it "one of the best 'mission' films of the '60s, and should have been a bigger hit (although it did well, it just wasn't Guns of Navarone) – maybe the story takes too long to get going".

== Awards and honours ==
Lilli Palmer won the Prize San Sebastián for Best Actress at the 1965 San Sebastián International Film Festival.

== Home media ==
Operation Crossbow has been released worldwide on videocassette, with a PAL release for the United Kingdom and other markets. A DVD Region 1 version of Operation Crossbow was released in the United States and in certain parts of Europe. A Region 1 Blu-ray was released on 12 November 2019 with a runtime of 1 hour and 56 minutes. A region-free DVD has subsequently been released in Europe.

== Comic-book adaption ==
- Dell Movie Classic: Operation Crossbow (October–December 1965)
