= Outcasts of the City =

1958 film

- Theatrical release poster
- Directed by: Boris Petroff
- Screenplay by: Stephen Longstreet
- Produced by: Boris Petroff
- Starring: Osa Massen; Robert Hutton; Maria Palmer; Nestor Paiva; John Hamilton; George N. Neise
- Cinematography: Walter Strenge
- Edited by: Frank Doyle
- Music by: Harry Sukman
- Production company: Lorraine Productions
- Distributed by: Republic Pictures
- Release date: January 10, 1958
- Running time: 61 minutes
- Country: United States
- Language: English

Outcasts of the City is a 1958 American drama film directed by Boris Petroff and written by Stephen Longstreet. The film stars Osa Massen, Robert Hutton, Maria Palmer, Nestor Paiva, John Hamilton and George N. Neise. The film was released on January 10, 1958 by Republic Pictures.

== Plot ==
Leda Mueller seeks refuge in the United States, claiming to be the wife of Jerry Seabrook, a missing World War II combat pilot. A sympathetic colonel requires proof, whereupon a priest vouches for Leda's marriage and also tells the colonel she is expecting a baby.

The colonel has knowledge that Jerry is alive, so Leda explains how they Jerry. A crash landing led to his taking refuge in an empty apartment that turned out to be hers. His co-pilot Biff is seriously injured, and by the time Leda can help find him, he is dead.

Hans Welton, a German jealous over Leda's interest in the American pilot, takes up with her best friend Helena and recruits her to find out anything she can about Jerry's wartime activities. As intrigue builds, it turns out that Jerry is being court-martialed and charged with the murder of Hans. In a courtroom, the circumstances of the German's death are explained, and Jerry then rushes to the side of Leda, who has given birth prematurely and near death.

== Cast ==
- Osa Massen as Leda Mueller
- Robert Hutton as Lt. Gerald Seabrook
- Maria Palmer as Helena Schiller
- Nestor Paiva as Pastor Skira
- John Hamilton as Colonel
- George N. Neise as Hans Welton
- Leon Tyler as Biff
- Larry J. Blake as Hecker
- Norbert Schiller as Doctor
- Michael Dale as Sgt. Hammond
- George Sanders as G.I. Announcer
- John Close as Army Officer
- John Clark as Army Officer
- John Harding as Army Officer
- James Wilson as Army Officer

== See also ==
- List of American films of 1958
