= Rendezvous 24 =

1946 film

- Theatrical release poster
- Directed by: James Tinling
- Screenplay by: Aubrey Wisberg
- Produced by: Sol M. Wurtzel
- Starring: William Gargan; Maria Palmer; Patrick O'Moore; Herman Bing; Kay Connors; Kurt Katch
- Cinematography: Benjamin H. Kline
- Edited by: William F. Claxton
- Music by: Arthur Lange
- Production company: Sol M. Wurtzel Productions
- Distributed by: 20th Century Fox
- Release date: May 6, 1946
- Running time: 70 minutes
- Country: United States
- Language: English

Rendezvous 24 is a 1946 American war film directed by James Tinling and written by Aubrey Wisberg. The film stars William Gargan, Maria Palmer, Patrick O'Moore, Herman Bing, Kay Connors and Kurt Katch. The film was released on May 6, 1946, by 20th Century Fox.

== Plot ==
Following World War II a group of unrepentant German scientists scheme to detonate a radio-controlled explosion of an atomic bomb in Paris.

== Cast ==
- William Gargan as Agent Larry Cameron
- Maria Palmer as Greta Holvig
- Patrick O'Moore as Agent George Timothy
- Herman Bing as Herr Schmidt
- Kay Connors as Kay
- Kurt Katch as Dr. Heligmann
- David Leonard as Prof. Gustav Kleinheldt
- John Bleifer as Becker
- Henry Rowland as Otto Manfred
- George Sorel as Dr. Zarig
- Eilene Janssen as Anchaka Schmidt
