= Alcoa Presents One Step Beyond =

American anthology series (1959–1961)

- Also known as: One Step Beyond
- Genre: Anthology; Supernatural; Fantasy; Science fiction
- Created by: Merwin Gerard
- Directed by: John Newland
- Presented by: John Newland
- Theme music composer: Harry Lubin
- Opening theme: "Fear"
- Composer: Harry Lubin
- Country of origin: United States
- Original language: English
- No. of seasons: 3
- No. of episodes: 97

Production
- Producer: Collier Young
- Running time: 25 minutes
- Production companies: ABC Films; Joseph L. Schenck Enterprises

Original release
- Network: ABC
- Release: January 20, 1959 – July 4, 1961

Alcoa Presents: One Step Beyond (also known as One Step Beyond) is an American anthology series created by Merwin Gerard. The original series was broadcast for three seasons by the American Broadcasting Company (ABC) from January 1959 to July 1961.

== Overview ==
Created by Merwin Gerard and produced by Collier Young, One Step Beyond was hosted by John Newland, "your guide to the supernatural" (also credited as "Our guide into the world of the unknown"). Newland, who also directed every episode, presented tales that explored paranormal events and various situations that defied "logical" explanation. One Step Beyond purported only to tell stories based on "human record" (documented historical events).

Unlike other anthology programs, the ABC network series episodes were presented in the form of straightforward 30-minute docudramas, all said to be based on "human record" (implying historically factual events); however, the incidents depicted were closer to popular urban legends dramatized for the screen. The program included the corporate name of sponsor Alcoa in its title for its initial run. In syndication, the program title became simply One Step Beyond.

One Step Beyond filled the time slot at 10 p.m. Tuesday vacated by the crime/police reality show Confession.

Among its varied tales, One Step Beyond dealt with premonition of death ("The Day the World Wept: The Lincoln Story") and disaster ("Tidal Wave", "Night of April 14th"); the existence of ghosts ("The Last Round", "The Death Waltz"); and wildly improbable coincidence ("Reunion"). Paula Raymond appeared in the third episode of the first season, initially broadcast on February 3, 1959, in the episode titled "Emergency Only", which also featured Jocelyn Brando as a screaming fortune teller at a party. Joan Fontaine and Warren Beatty play husband and wife in the episode "The Visitor".

=== "The Sacred Mushroom" ===
A January 1961 episode, "The Sacred Mushroom", deals with the discovery of mind-altering drugs. Newland traveled to Mexico where he met with a local shaman who was an initiate in ritual use of magic mushrooms. The then-unknown mushrooms were purportedly able to increase the user's psychic powers. Newland ingested several mushrooms and allowed his reactions to be filmed for broadcast. This was the only episode of the entire series to have a relatively reality-based "documentary" tone, rather than the scripted docudramas that comprised all other episodes. Although the subject matter (the enhancement of psychic powers) accorded with the rest of the series, this episode was somewhat controversial and was omitted from the syndication; it has been seen only rarely since its original broadcast. However, according to Newland, it was the most popular episode of the series. A complete transcript of this episode is reproduced in chapter seven of The Sacred Mushrooms of Mexico by Brian Akers.

=== Writing staff ===
The show used a large number of writers. Larry Marcus was the most prolific contributor, with over 30 episodes to his credit. Marcus would later win an Emmy for his work on Route 66, and receive an Oscar nomination for his screenplay for the 1980 film The Stunt Man.

Other relatively frequent contributors included show creator Merwin Gerard; Don M. Mankiewicz (who would later write for Star Trek); Gabrielle Upton (who wrote for a wide range of anthology shows, including The Alfred Hitchcock Hour, and was later head writer of The Guiding Light); and Howard Rodman (later story editor of Route 66 and creator of Harry O).

Charles Beaumont wrote two episodes of One Step Beyond just before jumping over to The Twilight Zone, to which he was a major contributor. Francis Cockrell also wrote two episodes; he was a frequent writer on Alfred Hitchcock Presents and would later contribute to the second season of The Outer Limits.

=== Guest appearances ===
- Luana Anders in "The Burning Girl"
- Tod Andrews in "Brainwave"
- John Beal in "The Lovers"
- Warren Beatty and Joan Fontaine together in "The Visitor"
- Edward Binns in "Vanishing Point"
- Whit Bissell in "Brainwave"
- Robert Blake in "Gypsy"
- Charles Bronson in "The Last Round"
- Alfred Burke in "The Sorcerer"
- Walter Burke in "The Front Runner"
- Paul Carr in "Reunion"
- Veronica Cartwright in "The Haunting"
- Don Dubbins in "The Navigator" 1st Mate
- Louise Fletcher in "The Open Window"
- Byron Foulger in "Hong Kong Passage"
- Arthur Franz in "The Call from Tomorrow"
- Skip Homeier in "The Bride Possessed"
- Ronald Howard in "The Haunting"
- Werner Klemperer in "The Haunted U-Boat"
- Robert Lansing in "The Voice"
- Wesley Lau in "The Haunted U-Boat" and in "The Mask"
- Cloris Leachman and Marcel Dalio together in "The Dark Room"
- Christopher Lee in "The Sorcerer"
- Robert Loggia in "The Hand"
- Jack Lord in "Father Image"
- Patrick Macnee in "The Night of April 14th"
- John Marley in "The Night of the Kill"
- Ross Martin in "Echo"
- Patty McCormack in "Make Me Not a Witch"
- Ann McCrea in "Night of the Kill"
- Yvette Mimieux in "The Clown"
- Elizabeth Montgomery in "The Death Waltz"
- André Morell in "The Avengers"
- Patrick O'Neal in "The Return of Mitchell Campion"
- Maria Palmer in "The Secret"
- Edward Platt in "The Burning Girl"
- Donald Pleasence in "The Confession"
- Suzanne Pleshette in "Delusion"
- Paula Raymond in "Emergency Only"
- Pernell Roberts in "The Vision"
- Albert Salmi in "The Peter Hurkos Story" Part I & Part II
- William Schallert in "Tidal Wave" and "Epilogue"
- William Shatner in "The Promise"
- Olan Soule in "The Navigator" Stowaway/Deadman
- Warren Stevens in "The Riddle"
- Torin Thatcher in "Doomsday"
- Harry Townes in "The Bride Possessed"
- Yvette Vickers and Mike Connors together in "The Aerialist"
- Robert Webber in "The Captain and His Guests"
- Peter Wyngarde in "Nightmare..."
- Ken Wayne as Guard in "The Stranger"

== Production ==
The last 13 episodes of the third season were filmed at MGM Studios, Borehamwood, England, due to a suggestion by Newland. According to Newland, "I thought it would give a little boost to the show because Great Britain offered good actors, good situations, and good settings. We sought permission from Alcoa, and they okayed it."

=== Music ===
Harry Lubin composed the music for the series with a soundtrack album, Music from 'One Step Beyond' released by Decca Records (DL 8970) in 1960. The most well-known tracks of the series were entitled: "Weird" (originally composed by Lubin for the score of an April 1955 Loretta Young Show episode, "Feeling No Pain"), usually played when the supernatural aspect of the episode was being discussed, and "Fear" that became the musical theme of the series.

The Ventures included a cover version of the show's main theme music "Fear" in their 1964 Dolton Records album The Ventures in Space. The second season of The Outer Limits used a variation of "Fear" for the end titles. A heavy metal cover of the title song was recorded by the band Fantômas on their album The Director's Cut in 2001.

== Episodes ==
Season	Episodes	Originally released	
Season	Episodes	First released	Last released
1	22	January 20, 1959	June 16, 1959
2	39	September 15, 1959	June 21, 1960
3	36	August 30, 1960	July 4, 1961

=== Season 1 (1959) ===
No. overall	No. in season	Title	Directed by	Written by	Original release date
1	1	"The Bride Possessed"	John Newland	Merwin Gerard	January 20, 1959
On her honeymoon a bride (Virginia Leith) is possessed by a murdered woman, who reveals her murderer and the murder weapon.
2	2	"Night of April 14th"	John Newland	Collier Young / Larry Marcus	January 27, 1959
A woman (Barbara Lord) has a recurring nightmare of drowning in cold, dark water. The next day her fiancé (Patrick Macnee) announces that the couple will honeymoon aboard the RMS Titanic. Other premonitions of that disaster are also revealed.
3	3	"Emergency Only"	John Newland	Collier Young	February 3, 1959
In a hypnotic trance at a cocktail party, Ellen Larrabee (Jocelyn Brando) predicts a dangerous train trip for a skeptical witness, thereby preventing a collision. With Paula Raymond.
4	4	"The Dark Room"	John Newland	Francis Cockrell	February 10, 1959
A photographer (Cloris Leachman) on assignment in the south of France is almost strangled by one of her subjects (Marcel Dalio), who turns out to be the ghost of a murderer.
5	5	"Twelve Hours to Live"	John Newland	Merwin Gerard	February 17, 1959
After an argument with his wife (Jean Allison), a man drives away in a storm and suffers a car accident. She suddenly feels that his life is in danger. The telepathic clues she receives from him, and her determination, result in his rescue.
6	6	"Epilogue"	John Newland	Don M. Mankiewicz	February 24, 1959
Carl Archer (Charles Aidman), a recovering alcoholic, travels to Nevada to reconcile with his wife, Helen (Julie Adams). She and son Stevie visit a nearby silver mine when the mine collapses. Helen dies and her ghost leads Carl and others to rescue Stevie.
7	7	"The Dream"	John Newland	John Dunkel	March 3, 1959
In World War II, Herbert Blakely (Reginald Owen), on night lookout near a coastal British town, dreams about bombs falling on his wife, and she dreams of German commandos attacking his outpost. They both awaken in time to be saved as the double dream proves true.
8	8	"Premonition"	John Newland	Paul David	March 10, 1959
Lisa Garrick has everything — including a premonition of her own death. Skip Young of The Adventures of Ozzie and Harriet guest features as Martin. Beverly Washburn is young Lisa. Pamela Lincoln is older Lisa. With Julie Payne (actress, born 1940).
9	9	"The Dead Part of the House"	John Newland	Michael Plant	March 17, 1959
After the death of her mother, a haunted nursery and three dolls help a young girl reconcile with her dad. With Joanne Linville.
10	10	"The Vision"	John Newland	Larry Marcus	March 24, 1959
French troops (Pernell Roberts, Peter Miles, H.M. Wynant, and Jerry Oddo) stop fighting and desert their trenches during World War I. Based on the legend of the Angels of Mons.
11	11	"The Devil's Laughter"	John Newland	Alfred Brenner	March 31, 1959
In late 19th-century London, prison authorities are having trouble with convicted killer John Marriott: they cannot seem to execute him. Alfred Ryder stars as boastful, obnoxious Marriott; Ben Wright plays the Executioner; and Gordon Richards portrays the Doctor.
12	12	"The Return of Mitchell Campion"	John Newland	Merwin Gerard	April 7, 1959
A man (Patrick O'Neal) is known by everyone on a small Mediterranean island that he has never visited. Soon he, too, remembers being there before, but he was in the hospital at the time of the supposed visit. With Lilyan Chauvin.
13	13	"The Navigator"	John Newland	Don M. Mankiewicz	April 14, 1959
Robert Ellenstein stars as Captain Peabody, Don Dubbins as the First Mate, Joel Fluellen as Cookie. This sea yarn aired on the anniversary of the sinking of the Titanic on April 14, 1912.
14	14	"The Secret"	John Newland	Michael Plant	April 21, 1959
A young woman (Maria Palmer) is left alone and unloved by her domineering and abusive husband (Robert Douglas). With the use of a Ouija board in the attic, she soon invents an imaginary lover, Jeremy (Albert Carrier), who loves and comforts her — then she begins to suspect that her invisible "lover" may not be all that imaginary. In fact, he may have lived and died long before she was born.
15	15	"The Aerialist"	John Newland	Jack Mills / Larry Marcus	April 28, 1959
The Amazing Patruzzios are a circus trapeze act. Mario argues with his father, the patriarch Gino, about his cheating wife, Carlotta. During an act, Mario loses his grip on his father's wrist; Gino falls, is paralyzed, then is hospitalized. Mario is torn by guilt and depression, but cannot leave the circus due to his precarious financial situation. Drunk, Mario also falls during an act, but his father's grip saves him — a supernatural act of bilocation, since Gino was unable to leave the hospital. Stars Mike Connors as Mario, Yvette Vickers as Carlotta, and Robert Carricart as Gino.
16	16	"The Burning Girl"	John Newland	Catherine Turney	May 5, 1959
Alice Denning (Luana Anders) is a shy teenage girl who is trying to fit into a new community, make new friends and coexist with her controlling stepmother and alcoholic father, who insists she's a pyromaniac despite her pleas of innocence: Wherever Alice goes, fires start. With Sandra Knight and Olive Deering.
17	17	"The Haunted U-Boat"	John Newland	Larry Marcus	May 12, 1959
While transporting a Nazi official (Werner Klemperer), a German U-boat attempts to evade detection by the sonar of American and British ships. But its location is betrayed repeatedly by the noise of a rhythmic banging sound coming from the submarine, appearing to be haunted by the ghost of a worker who died on board during its construction. Wesley Lau portrays the U-boat's captain.
18	18	"The Image of Death"	John Newland	Larry Marcus	May 19, 1959
An inspector is suspicious about the death of the wife of a Marquis, who, in fact, did kill her, with his lover Charlotte as his accomplice. The Marquis becomes increasingly haunted by a stain on the wall which seems to be the image of his dead wife's face. He is ultimately tried and executed, but for the murder of Charlotte, who has been literally scared to death by the stain. Starring Max Adrian and Doris Dowling.
19	19	"The Captain's Guests"	John Newland	Charles Beaumont	May 26, 1959
A married couple (Nancy Hadley and Robert Webber) from New York rent an old house along the New England coast that the locals consider to be haunted. A sadistic 19th-century sea captain, Michael Clawson, whose portrait hangs in the house, possesses Mr. Courtney's mind and poisons their lives as he obsessively accuses Mrs. Courtney of infidelity. Jon Lormer plays the reluctant realtor, Leach.
20	20	"Echo"	John Newland	Merwin Gerard	June 2, 1959
Paul Marlin (Ross Martin) is acquitted by a jury of the murder of his wife, although most people believe he did in fact kill her. To escape questioning reporters, he takes a house in the country. Soon, however, he begins to have visions of his dead wife's brother, Roger Wiley (Ed Kemmer), in mirrors, which he sees as premonitions of his own murder. He is shocked one day when Roger arrives from New Zealand, shows up at his front door and precipitates the real culprit's capture.
21	21	"Front Runner"	John Newland	Don M. Mankiewicz	June 9, 1959
Dying in hospital, renowned jockey Ronnie Watson (Ben Cooper) tells a newsman (Sandy Kenyon) his deathbed confession. During a race, Ronnie committed an interference foul against the horse of his mentor and romantic rival, Sam Barry (Walter Burke), after learning that Sam was going to marry the woman Ronnie loved. Furious with jealousy, Ronnie won the race by cheating. Sam loses everything, while Ronnie's career takes off. Sam lays a curse on Ronnie that no one will ever believe him, then slides into a life of penury. Years later, during Ronnie's last race before retiring, Sam swerves Ronnie's horse out of the race. No one believes him, because Sam had died that day.
22	22	"The Riddle"	John Newland	Larry Marcus	June 16, 1959
An irrational hatred in an American tourist on the Bombay-Calcutta Mail Railroad train is considered in terms of metempsychosis -- the transmigration of souls. Starring Warren Stevens and Bethel Leslie.

=== Season 2 (1959–60) ===
No. overall	No. in season	Title	Directed by	Written by	Original release date
23	1	"Delusion"	John Newland	Larry Marcus	September 15, 1959
A man with a rare blood type (Norman Lloyd) has a psychic connection with people that he gives blood transfusions to. Having a vision of the murder of a woman he gave blood to (Suzanne Pleshette), he tries to prevent it.
24	2	"Ordeal on Locust Street"	John Newland	Michael Plant	September 22, 1959
A woman enlists the aid of a hypnotist in order to cure her deformed son.
25	3	"Brainwave"	John Newland	Charles Beaumont and Larry Marcus	October 6, 1959
A ship's medic, haunted by his brother's death, must save the captain's life.
26	4	"Doomsday"	John Newland	Larry Marcus	October 13, 1959
During the 1600s an innocent woman, before being burned as a witch, curses the Earl's family so that each generation the eldest son dies before the father. Starring: Don Harron, Torin Thatcher and Patricia Michon.
27	5	"Night of the Kill"	John Newland	Merwin Gerard	October 20, 1959
Little Davey Morris, lost in the woods, is protected by a giant furry friend.
28	6	"The Inheritance"	John Newland	Larry Marcus	October 27, 1959
A seemingly sentient diamond necklace strangles its wearers. Starring Sean McClory and Jan Miner.
29	7	"The Open Window"	John Newland	Larry Marcus	November 3, 1959
A struggling artist witnesses a recurring vision of a woman attempting suicide through an open window of his Greenwich Village apartment.
30	8	"Message From Clara"	John Newland	Larry Marcus	November 10, 1959
The gift of a brooch causes a woman (Barbara Baxley) teaching English to immigrants to write messages in a foreign language from a dead woman.
31	9	"Forked Lightning"	John Newland	Merwin Gerard	November 17, 1959
A premonition of death causes a desperate man to fulfill his own demise. Starring Frank Maxwell, Ralph Nelson, Roberta Haynes and Candy Moore.
32	10	"Reunion"	John Newland	Larry Marcus	November 24, 1959
A six-year-old murder is exposed at a reunion of friends after WWII in a bizarre manner. Starring Paul Carr, Betsy von Furstenberg and Rory Harrity.
33	11	"Dead Ringer"	John Newland	Catherine Turney	December 1, 1959
A woman (Norma Crane) sees a vision of her twin sister committing arson. With Grant Williams (actor).
34	12	"The Stone Cutter"	John Newland	Gail Ingram	December 8, 1959
A gravestone cutter writes people's death dates (correctly) before they die.
35	13	"Father Image"	John Newland	Merwin Gerard	December 15, 1959
A man (Jack Lord) inherits an old burlesque theater, and learns more about his father than he expected.
36	14	"Make Me Not a Witch"	John Newland	Gail Ingram	December 22, 1959
A young farm girl (Academy Award-nominated actress Patty McCormack) suddenly acquires the psychic power to read minds and, despite warnings from her parents that others will call her a witch, she sneaks off at night and assists a priest in reading the mind of an elderly stroke victim who knows the location of two missing children.
37	15	"The Hand"	John Newland	Larry Marcus	December 29, 1959
A murderer cannot seem to wash the blood off his hand.
38	16	"The Justice Tree"	John Newland	Merwin Gerard	January 5, 1960
A dangerous criminal threatens a widow and her son, but they have an unlikely protector.
39	17	"Earthquake"	John Newland	Larry Marcus	January 12, 1960
A lowly bellhop (David Opatoshu) tries to convince people of his vision of an earthquake that destroys San Francisco.
40	18	"Forests of the Night"	John Newland	Catherine Turney	January 19, 1960
Three friends play a Chinese game using Confucius' Book of Changes. Ted Dolliver's symbol is a leopard.
41	19	"Call from Tomorrow"	John Newland	Gabrielle Upton	January 26, 1960
An actress hears the sounds of a crying child while performing Desdemona in Othello. Starring: Arthur Franz and Margaret Phillips.
42	20	"Who are You?"	John Newland	Merwin Gerard	February 2, 1960
Laurie (Reba Waters) recovers from an illness, claiming her name is Alice. With: Philip Bourneuf, Anna Lee, Phyllis Hill and Jacqueline deWit.
43	21	"The Day the World Wept: The Lincoln Story"	John Newland	Larry Marcus	February 9, 1960
Several people have premonitions that Abraham Lincoln (Barry Atwater) will be assassinated, including Lincoln himself.
44	22	"The Lovers"	John Newland	Joseph Petracca, Russell Beggs	February 16, 1960
Comical love story about an older man, a young woman, and a poltergeist.
45	23	"Vanishing Point"	John Newland	Larry Marcus, J.G. Ezra	February 23, 1960
A couple go to a summer house to try to repair their marriage. The wife vanishes, and the husband is accused of murder. Edward Binns and June Vincent.
46	24	"The Mask"	John Newland	Joseph Petracca, Russell Beggs	March 1, 1960
A pilot (Wesley Lau) believes that he is possessed by an Egyptian prince.
47	25	"The Haunting"	John Newland	Gabrielle Upton	March 8, 1960
In the Swiss Alps, a paranoid man (Ronald Howard) kills the best man of his upcoming wedding. A strange chill surrounds him and anyone that he associates with. With Christine White and Veronica Cartwright.
48	26	"The Explorer"	John Newland	Don M. Mankiewicz	March 15, 1960
An explorer in the Sahara desert is led to water by a man who died the year before.
49	27	"The Clown"	John Newland	Gabrielle Upton	March 22, 1960
After murdering his wife (Yvette Mimieux, in her debut), a man continually sees the image of Pippo the Clown (Mickey Shaughnessy), whom she befriended, in reflections, trying to strangle him.
50	28	"I Saw You Tomorrow"	John Newland	Merwin Geràrd	April 5, 1960
An American diplomat staying at an Englishwoman's 'stately home' experiences a vision of a murder. Later, as fellow guests, the murderer and his victim wife arrive.
51	29	"Encounter"	John Newland	De Witt Copp	April 12, 1960
A plane disappears and the pilot turns up 1,000 miles away, claiming that he was kidnapped by a UFO.
52	30	"The Peter Hurkos Story"	John Newland	Jerome Gruskin	April 19, 1960
53	31	"The Peter Hurkos Story"	John Newland	Jerome Gruskin	April 26, 1960
Coming out of a coma after a 50-foot fall, Peter Hurkos (Albert Salmi) develops psychic powers, and goes into show business. Dissatisfied with being a carnival freak, Hurkos undergoes testing to proves he is genuine, and assists in solving a terrible murder.
54	32	"Delia"	John Newland	Merwin Gerard	May 3, 1960
A man spends eight years searching for a girl who vanished from an island.
55	33	"The Visitor"	John Newland	Larry Marcus	May 10, 1960
A bitter wife (Joan Fontaine) is visited by a younger version of her husband (Warren Beatty), who wants to rekindle their failing marriage.
56	34	"Gypsy"	John Newland	Gail Upton	May 17, 1960
After a prison escape, a young man (Robert Blake) is convinced by one of the other convicts to surrender himself. But the gypsy convict was killed in the attempt and never made it over the wall.
57	35	"Contact"	John Newland	Paul David	May 24, 1960
A gift of a pocket watch from his wife (Catherine McLeod) causes a man (Ron Randell) to foresee a murder and attempt to prevent it.
58	36	"The Lonely Room"	John Newland	Larry Marcus	May 31, 1960
Shy Henri wants to date Therese, but his biggest competition is, a more confident version of himself!
59	37	"House of the Dead"	John Newland	Don M. Mankiewicz	June 7, 1960
A Chinese girl fears that her ethnicity will harm her British fiancé's military career. She absconds to the title dwelling, while he searches for her.
60	38	"Goodbye Grandpa"	John Newland	Gabrielle Upton	June 14, 1960
Before Grandpa dies, he promises his grandchildren that he will signal them with his special train whistle.
61	39	"The Storm"	John Newland	Jerome Gruskin	June 21, 1960
"The Storm" is a new painting done in the style of a painter who died in the Korean War.

=== Season 3 (1960–61) ===
No. overall	No. in season	Title	Directed by	Written by	Original release date
62	1	"Tidalwave"	John Newland	Charles Larson	August 30, 1960
A woman who uses a wheelchair is helpless on an island with an approaching tidal wave.
63	2	"Anniversary of a Murder"	John Newland	Larry Marcus, Jane Anna Pritchard	September 27, 1960
A couple having an illicit affair accidentally hit a bicyclist while driving. Not wanting to expose their affair, they conceal their accident.
64	3	"The Death Waltz"	John Newland	Charles Larson, Amanda Ellis	October 4, 1960
Lilly (Elizabeth Montgomery), a manipulative general's daughter, arranges for one of her suitors to go on a dangerous mission so she can go to a ball with the other. When he is killed, his remark "I would come back from Hell to be with you.", becomes true.
65	4	"The Return"	John Newland	Larry Marcus	October 11, 1960
During the Korean War, a wounded soldier makes his way back, despite being blind.
66	5	"If You See Sally"	John Newland	Howard Rodman, Roberta Martin	October 18, 1960
Sally Ellis, unjustly blamed for the death of her brother, absconds from home. Finally forgiven, she tries and tries to return home, even after death.
67	6	"Moment of Hate"	John Newland	Charles Larson, David Peltz	October 25, 1960
Bad-tempered dress designer Karen Wadsworth (Joanne Linville) can, when angry, literally wish someone to death.
68	7	"To Know the End"	John Newland	Larry Marcus	November 1, 1960
During 1939 a woman has a vision of losing her husband (whom she has not met) in the war. During 1943, it begins to come true.
69	8	"The Trap"	John Newland	Larry Marcus	November 15, 1960
Dominic is in Chicago, dehydrated and suffocating, unaware his twin brother is trapped in a mine shaft in Arizona.
70	9	"The Voice"	John Newland	Charles Larson	November 22, 1960
During 1902 a reporter (Robert Lansing) covers the trial of some villagers who burned down a barn trying to kill a demon.
71	10	"The Promise"	John Newland	Larry Marcus	November 29, 1960
In London after World War II, a former German soldier (William Shatner) redeems himself defusing bombs, with a baby on the way.
72	11	"Tonight at 12:17"	John Newland	Larry Marcus, Jane Anna Pritchard	December 6, 1960
Every night at 12:17, expectant mother Laura Perkins (Peggy Ann Garner) hears the sound of a small airplane crashing through her roof.
73	12	"Where Are They?"	John Newland	Larry Marcus, Merwin Gerard	December 13, 1960
Two stories of strange disappearances. In the first a man calling himself the Ghost causes stones to rain daily on Chico, California, before vanishing. In the second, Charles Elton invents a pellet that turns water into gasoline, but disappears, taking the secret with him.
74	13	"Legacy of Love"	John Newland	Howard Rodman	December 20, 1960
A couple who have never met before are inexplicably drawn together and begin to experience memories of another life.
75	14	"Rendezvous"	John Newland	Merwin Gerard, Josefina Seiler	December 27, 1960
A widow is protected from harm by her husband's ghost.
76	15	"The Executioner"	John Newland	Bob and Wanda Duncan	January 3, 1961
A Confederate soldier is protected by the ghost of his loyal dog.
77	16	"The Last Round"	John Newland	Don M. Mankiewicz	January 10, 1961
Yank Dawson (Charles Bronson) is an aging boxer in a haunted auditorium in World War II England.
78	17	"Dead Man's Tale"	John Newland	Merwin Gerard, C.V. Trench	January 17, 1961
A former reporter having bad times spontaneously writes a story of two brothers' greed.
79	18	"The Sacred Mushroom"	John Newland	Larry Marcus, Collier Young	January 24, 1961
See section above.
80	19	"The Gift"	John Newland	Charles Larson	January 31, 1961
A fake psychic suddenly has genuine powers and sees a vision of her son committing murder.
81	20	"Person Unknown"	John Newland	Larry Marcus, James Crenshaw	February 7, 1961
In Mexico, a doctor is accused of a murder that was actually committed by an invisible ghost with huge hands.
82	21	"Night of Decision"	John Newland	Merwin Gerard	February 21, 1961
George Washington during 1777, considering surrendering, has a vision of the future.
83	22	"The Stranger"	John Newland	Larry Marcus	February 28, 1961
A prison convict, dead for 20 years, seems to help those in need.
84	23	"Justice"	John Newland	Guy Morgan	March 7, 1961
In Wales, a police officer is suspected of murder because the banker who confessed was asleep in church at the time.
85	24	"The Face"	John Newland	Derry Quinn	March 14, 1961
Stephen Bolt has a reoccurring nightmare of a bearded man (Roger Delgado) stabbing him to death. He decides to kill him first.
86	25	"The Room Upstairs"	John Newland	Merwin Gerard, Larry Marcus	March 21, 1961
Esther Hollis (Lois Maxwell) is afraid of family madness affecting both her and her unborn baby when she sees an apparition of a sick child in their upstairs sewing room.
87	26	"Signal Received"	John Newland	Derry Quinn	April 4, 1961
During World War II, three British sailors receive premonitions about their ship, HMS Hood.
88	27	"The Confession"	John Newland	Larry Marcus	April 11, 1961
An innocent man is hanged because barrister Harvey Lawrence (Donald Pleasence) destroys a confession that would have cleared the man he was prosecuting for political reasons. Later, that confession just will not go away.
89	28	"The Avengers"	John Newland	Martin Benson, Rosamunt Harcout-Smith	April 25, 1961
A ruthless Nazi general (André Morell) and his girlfriend celebrate at a chateau notorious for its vengeful ghosts.
90	29	"The Prisoner"	John Newland	Larry Marcus	May 2, 1961
During 1943, a refugee from the Warsaw ghetto finds herself in control of a wounded German soldier (Anton Diffring).
91	30	"Blood Flower"	John Newland	Merwin Gerard	May 16, 1961
A parasitic flower, grown from the blood of a South American revolutionary, turns a pacifist scholar into an assassin.
92	31	"The Sorcerer"	John Newland	Derry Quinn	May 23, 1961
During 1915, a German officer (Christopher Lee) insists that he murdered his unfaithful lover, despite the fact that he was 800 kilometers away at the time.
93	32	"The Villa"	John Newland	Derry Quinn	June 6, 1961
A flashing strobe light causes a woman to see a vision of someone dying in a lift in a dark villa.
94	33	"Midnight"	John Newland	Martin Benson and Hendrik Vollaerts	June 13, 1961
Walking across a foggy London Bridge one night, a writer falls in love with a beautiful woman he meets. However, she is not quite what she seems to be.
95	34	"The Tiger"	John Newland	Ian Stuart Black	June 20, 1961
A cruel governess locks little Pamela in a "punishment room" where her only friend is an imaginary tiger.
96	35	"Nightmare"	John Newland	Martin Benson	June 27, 1961
No matter how hard he tries, Paul Rollins (Peter Wyngarde) can only paint a woman named Claire, much to the dismay of his fiancée, Jill.
97	36	"Eyewitness"	John Newland	Derry Quinn	July 4, 1961
One night during 1883, the night editor of the newspaper Boston Star has a seizure, and writes about the eruption of Krakatoa, weeks before it could be confirmed.

== Syndication ==
After its cancellation during 1961, the series continued to be shown throughout the United States in off-network syndication until the early 1980s.

For its re-release to television for the Sci-Fi Channel during the 1990s, the initial and end titles were given new theme music and graphics designed for the time, as if the show had continued into the 1990s. These episodes were also edited for time from 25 minutes to 22 minutes.

Despite the public domain status for most episodes, the series' remaining copyrights belongs to its distributor CBS Television Distribution. CTD is the successor to the series' previous distributors, which include ABC Films successor Worldvision Enterprises and CTD's predecessor Paramount Domestic Television.

Episodes are currently broadcast by the Retro TV available as a digital subchannel in some US markets. Full episodes are also available for digital streaming on Amazon Prime Video (charge per episode as of 2021), FMC Movie Classics (free), Tubi (free), Amazing Classics (free), and YouTube (free).

In May 2021 the UK nostalgia channel Talking Pictures TV began to broadcast the series, with the first episode airing on 11 May. The show continues to air periodically as of 2026.

== Home media ==
Delta Entertainment Corporation in 2005 released a collection of 33 (presumably public domain) episodes on eight region-free DVDs.

During 2007, Mill Creek Entertainment released a 4-disc Region 1 DVD set entitled The Very Best of One Step Beyond. The set contains 50 episodes. The quality varied drastically from episode to episode.

On September 15, 2009, CBS Home Entertainment (distributed by Paramount under this label) released One Step Beyond - The Official 1st Season on Region 1 DVD.

The Film Chest Media Group released the series in a six-disc Collector's Box on April 7, 2015. The boxset contains 70 episodes of the series in total across six DVDs, which consist of all 22 episodes of Season 1, 32 of the 39 episodes of Season 2, but only 16 of the 36 episodes of Season 3. The set also includes synopses of the episodes inside.

One Step Beyond was the first pre-1973 in-house production of ABC to get a DVD release from CBS/Paramount. Other shows once distributed by ABC Films (which became Worldvision Enterprises) were either released by CBS/Paramount because the company owns the libraries of the actual producers of the shows (such as The Fugitive or The Mod Squad), or were released by different companies because ancillary rights are owned by other entities (such as George of the Jungle).

== The Next Step Beyond ==
During 1978, the series was remade partly by Gerard and Young, with John Newland hosting and directing most of the episodes; the new series was named The Next Step Beyond. The series was broadcast for one year with 25 episodes, 14 of which were remakes of One Step Beyond episodes.

== See also ==
- Beyond Belief: Fact or Fiction
- The Outer Limits
- The Twilight Zone
- Night Gallery
- Science Fiction Theatre
- Twin Peaks
- The X-Files
- The Hunger
- Masters of Horror
- Masters of Science Fiction
- Suspense
- Alfred Hitchcock Presents
- Hammer House of Horror
- Science fiction on television

== Bibliography ==
- Muir, John (2001). An Analytical Guide to Television's One Step Beyond, 1959-1961. Jefferson, N.C: McFarland & Company. ISBN 978-0-7864-0969-3. OCLC 45743343.
