= The Next Step Beyond =

- Title screen
- Genre: Horror
- Created by: Merwin Gerard
- Directed by: John Newland
- Starring: John Newland (Host)
- Theme music composer: Mark Snow
- Country of origin: United States
- Original language: English
- No. of seasons: 1
- No. of episodes: 25

Production
- Producers: Alan Jay Factor; Collier Young; Mitchell L. Gamison
- Editors: Phil Tucker; Bernard Gribble; Douglas M. Stewart, Jr.
- Running time: 30 minutes
- Production company: Factor-Newland Productions

Original release
- Release: 1978 – 1979

Related
- One Step Beyond; One Step Beyond

The Next Step Beyond is a 1978 remake of the 1950s–1960s American television series One Step Beyond, hosted by original host John Newland. Like One Step Beyond, the series purported to tell true stories of the supernatural. Unlike the original, this series had a short run of one season of 25 episodes, 14 of which were remakes.

== Background ==
Inspired by the syndication success of the original series as well as The Twilight Zone, Star Trek and especially Space: 1999, John Newland and Collier Young who participated in the original series, and Alan J. Factor decided to produce a new version of One Step Beyond to be titled The Next Step Beyond, for syndication. Original series creator Merwin Gerard came back as story editor. Newland returned as series host, sporting white hair and large eyeglasses, otherwise looking the same.

Worldvision Enterprises, distributor of the original series, distributed the new series as well. Without the benefit of a sponsor like Alcoa, the series only had a budget of $92,000 an episode.

There were several drawbacks. The series was shot on videotape, and lacked the noirish look of the original.

Several episodes of the original series were remade. All of the remakes were based on Merwin Gerard originals. The budget limit also limited the series' ability to present stories in other times, because of the lack of period costumes and settings, which had been lavish in One Step Beyond. The budget also meant the series could not afford any big name guest stars. The series was canceled after 25 episodes were produced. After running a few cycles on television, the series disappeared and has not been seen since.

The remakes were a bad idea, we thought we could fool the audience, and we soon learned we couldn't.

— John Newland

== Episodes ==
No.	Title	Directed by	Written by	Original release date
1	"Tsunami"	John Newland	Merwin Gerard	January 5, 1978
A crippled woman (Laraine Stephens) is threatened by a tsunami, and only an autistic boy can help her. (remake of Tidal Wave)
2	"The Return of Cary De Witt"	John Newland	Merwin Gerard	TBA
A man recovering from a coma discovers that he may have a double life. (remake of The Return of Mitchell Campion)
3	"Possessed"	John Newland	Merwin Gerard	TBA
A woman is possessed by the spirit of a woman who died three months earlier. (remake of The Bride Possessed)
4	"The Love Connection"	John Newland	Story by : Merwin Gerard; Teleplay by : Christopher Loftin	TBA
A little girl faints in gym class. When she recovers, she insists she is the daughter of a grieving family who lost their daughter. (remake of Who Are You?)
5	"Ondine's Curse"	John Newland	Merwin Gerard	TBA
A man has a disease which mimics the appearance of death. (remake of Twelve Hours to Live)
6	"Dream of Disaster"	John Newland	Merwin Gerard	TBA
A woman has a recurring dream about a plane crash. (remake of Tonight at 12:17)
7	"Ghost Town"	John Newland	Arthur C. Pierce	TBA
A fashion model witnesses events of a 25-year-old murder at a photo shoot.
8	"Drums at Midnight"	John Newland	Harry Spaulding	TBA
A woman uses voodoo to get revenge on her stepmother.
9	"Portrait of the Mind"	Alan J. Factor	Jerry Sohl	TBA
A police sketch artist is aided by his ability to read minds.
10	"Other Voices"	Alan J. Factor	Story by : Merwin Gerard; Teleplay by : Arthur C. Pierce	TBA
A man has a vision of a murder yet to happen. (remake of I Saw You Tomorrow)
11	"A Matter of Pride"	John Newland	Peter Germano	TBA
A hypnotist dies after giving a boxer a posthypnotic suggestion.
12	"Ghost of Cellblock 2"	John Newland	Shelley Hartman, Clifford Campion	TBA
Six women have committed suicide in the same cell over the last 50 years. A female police officer decides to find out why.
13	"The Legacy"	John Newland	Christopher Lofton	TBA
A toy train set becomes a means of communication between a boy and the ghost of his grandfather.
14	"Cry Baby"	John Newland	Ed Burnham	TBA
The crying of his unborn baby leads a man to the rescue of his pregnant wife.
15	"Greed"	John Newland	Merwin Gerard	TBA
A desperate writer pens a story of two brothers destroyed by greed, that turns out to be true. (remake of Dead Man's Tale)
16	"Out of Body"	John Newland	Bernard Gerard	TBA
An innocent man convicted of murder avenges himself via astral projection.
17	"Key to Yesterday"	Alan J. Factor	Merwin Gerard	TBA
Inheriting a burlesque theater, a man has a vision of his father-as a murderer! (remake of Father Image)
18	"Woman in the Mirror"	John Newland	Merwin Gerard	TBA
Acquitted of murdering his wife, the guilty husband sees her reflection in the mirror firing a gun at him. (remake of Echo)
19	"The Haunted Inn"	Alan J. Factor	Harry Spaulding	TBA
An artist on the road crosses paths with a beautiful woman, and is directed towards an inn that's off the beaten path. Though the sounds of partying guests are frequently heard throughout the inn, the only other guests are Lucianne and Mrs. Argus.
20	"The Pact"	John Newland	Robert S. Biheller, W. Dal Jenkins	TBA
The curse of a gypsy fortune teller.
21	"Sin of Omission"	Alan J. Factor	Merwin Gerard	TBA
A woman fears for her sanity when she sees the ghost of a little girl in pain, until her husband sees it too. (remake of The Room Upstairs)
22	"Thunderbolt"	John Newland	Merwin Gerard	TBA
Forked lightning brings on a pair of premonitions. (remake of Forked Lightning)
23	"The Confession"	John Newland	Story by : Merwin Gerard; Teleplay by : George Arthur Bloom	February 7, 1978
A man accused of his wife's murder is plagued by visions, convincing him that he must be guilty.
24	"Trance of Death"	John Newland	Story by : Merwin Gerard; Teleplay by : Arthur C. Pierce	TBA
After an accident in karate class, a woman develops psychic powers. (remake of The Peter Hurkos Story)
25	"To Fight a Ghost"	John Newland	Story by : Merwin Gerard; Teleplay by : Harry Spaulding	April 1, 1979
A woman cannot accept that her husband is dead. (remake of Rendezvous)
