= George N. Neise =

American actor (1917–96)

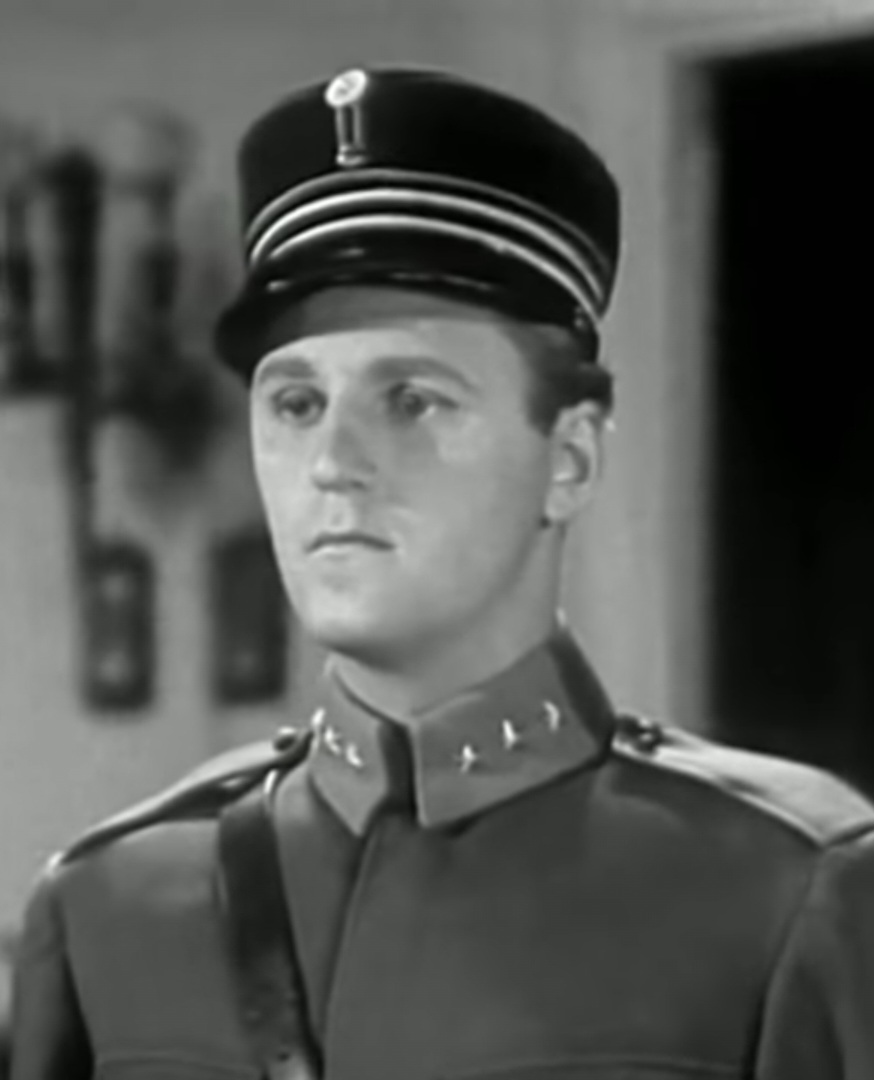
- Neise in They Raid by Night (1942)
- Born: February 16, 1917; Chicago, Illinois, US
- Died: April 14, 1996 (aged 79); Los Angeles, California, US
- Education: University of Wisconsin
- Occupation: Actor
- Years active: 1942–1978
- Spouse(s): Danielle Gentile; Lorna Thayer
- Children: 5

George N. Neise (February 16, 1917 – April 14, 1996) was an American character actor. He made over 120 film and television appearances between 1942 and 1978.

== Early years ==
Born in Chicago, Illinois, Neise was the son of Edwin Neise (1887–1942) and Bertha Neise (née Hagen, 1888–1968). He graduated from the University of Wisconsin, where he studied finance.

== Career ==
Neise began his career playing soldiers in war-themed films. (Note: An article in the September 19, 1948, issue of the Brooklyn Daily Eagle says, "Mr. Neise began his career in 1937 in Chicago's radio world ...")

Beginning in 1937, Neise acted in radio in Chicago, playing a variety of roles in programs. He acted in stock theater with the Peninsula Players in the summers of 1938 and 1939. His Broadway credits include Grandma's Diary (1948).

Neise served for four-and-a-half years as a pilot in the U.S. Army Air Corps during World War II. After that, he became an in-demand character actor, playing everything from Greek kings to angry bosses to airline pilots.

He may be best remembered for the dual role as the patronizing pharmacist Ralph Dimsal and powerful Ancient Greek king, Odius in the Three Stooges feature The Three Stooges Meet Hercules. He also appeared as the Martian Ogg and an unnamed airline pilot in the trio's next feature, The Three Stooges in Orbit.

Neise played Nat Wyndham on the television Western Wichita Town (1959–1960). His other TV appearances in Westerns were The Lone Ranger, Death Valley Days, Cheyenne, Zorro, Have Gun – Will Travel, The Rifleman, Maverick and as the wanted man in the episode of Robert Culp's TV series, Trackdown, which essentially became the pilot episode of Wanted: Dead or Alive.

Neise played in television dramas such as Perry Mason, in which he made five appearances. Because of the dishonest character roles he played, he was the murder victim in four of the episodes: Albert Tydings in the 1957 episode, "The Case of the Baited Hook," Wilfred Borden in the 1959 episode "The Case of the Calendar Girl," Morley Theilman in the 1962 episode "The Case of the Shapely Shadow," and Stacey Garnett in the 1965 episode "The Case of the Golden Girls." Neise continued being cast as a 'heavy', appearing as a safe cracker in Official Detective TV series episode The Blind Man in 1957. He also appeared on sitcoms such as The Dick Van Dyke Show, Green Acres, The Andy Griffith Show, Mister Ed, The Addams Family, Gilligan's Island, Hogan's Heroes, Adam-12, and Get Smart.

In one of The Honeymooners "Classic 39" episodes, Mr. Neise portrays Mr. Faversham, the play director who talks Ralph into doing the lead in the Raccoon Lodge play.

== Death ==
Neise died from cancer at his home in Hollywood on April 14, 1996, at age 79.

== Selected filmography ==
- They Raid by Night (1942) – Lt. Erik Falken
- Flight Lieutenant (1942) – Radio Operator (uncredited)
- War Dogs (1942) – Hans
- Valley of Hunted Men (1942) – Paul Schiller
- USS VD: Ship of Shame (1942) – Sailor (uncredited)
- Chetniks! The Fighting Guerrillas (1943) – German Scout (uncredited)
- They Got Me Covered (1943) – Matthews (uncredited)
- Air Force (1943) – Hickam Field Radio Operator (uncredited)
- Hangmen Also Die! (1943) – Mueller (uncredited)
- Action in the North Atlantic (1943) – German Lieutenant (uncredited)
- Bomber's Moon (1943) – The Gestapo Lieutenant
- Sahara (1943) – British Sergeant (uncredited)
- Once Upon a Time (1944) – Aviator Lieutenant (uncredited)
- Ladies of Washington (1944) – Radio Commentator (uncredited)
- Man from Frisco (1944) – Narrator (uncredited)
- Experiment Perilous (1944) – Alec
- Romance on the High Seas (1948) – Michael's Assistant (uncredited)
- One Sunday Afternoon (1948) – Chauncey (uncredited)
- My Dream Is Yours (1949) – Party Guest (uncredited)
- I'll See You in My Dreams (1951) – Isham Jones (uncredited)
- The Sharkfighters (1956) – Cmdr. George Zimmer
- Tomahawk Trail (1957) – Lt. Jonathan Davenport
- Pharaoh's Curse (1957) – Robert Quentin
- Jeanne Eagels (1957) – Jerry the Traveling Salesman (uncredited)
- The Tall Stranger (1957) – Mort Harper
- Outcasts of the City (1958) – Hans Welton
- Fort Massacre (1958) – Pendleton
- No Time for Sergeants (1958) – Baker (uncredited)
- Twenty Plus Two (1961) – Walter Collinson
- The Three Stooges Meet Hercules (1962) – Ralph Dimsal / King Odius
- Rome Adventure (1962) – Benjamin Bentley (uncredited)
- The Three Stooges in Orbit (1962) – Ogg / Airline Pilot
- Cattle King (1963) – Clancy – Reporter (uncredited)
- Johnny Cool (1963) – Adrian Guinness
- Looking for Love (1964) – Mr. Harvey Miller (uncredited)
- Two on a Guillotine (1965) – Reporter at Funeral (uncredited)
- Brainstorm (1965) – Party Guest (uncredited)
- I'll Take Sweden (1965) – Man in Bed with Blonde (uncredited)
- Do Not Disturb (1965) – Swedish Delegate (uncredited)
- Inside Daisy Clover (1965) – Director (uncredited)
- A Fine Madness (1966) – Television Interviewer (uncredited)
- Any Wednesday (1966) – Art Gallery Visitor (uncredited)
- Penelope (1966) – Mr. Halliday (uncredited)
- A Guide for the Married Man (1967) – Man in bed at Banner Motel
- Did You Hear the One About the Traveling Saleslady? (1968) – Ben Milford
- The Girl Who Knew Too Much (1969) – Marvin Easely
- The Computer Wore Tennis Shoes (1969) – College of Knowledge Sponsor (uncredited)
- On a Clear Day You Can See Forever (1970) – Wytelipt
- The Wacky Zoo of Morgan City (1970) – Councilman Thompson
- The Barefoot Executive (1971) – Network Executive
