= Morton and Mayo =

American Vaudeville dance and comedy duo

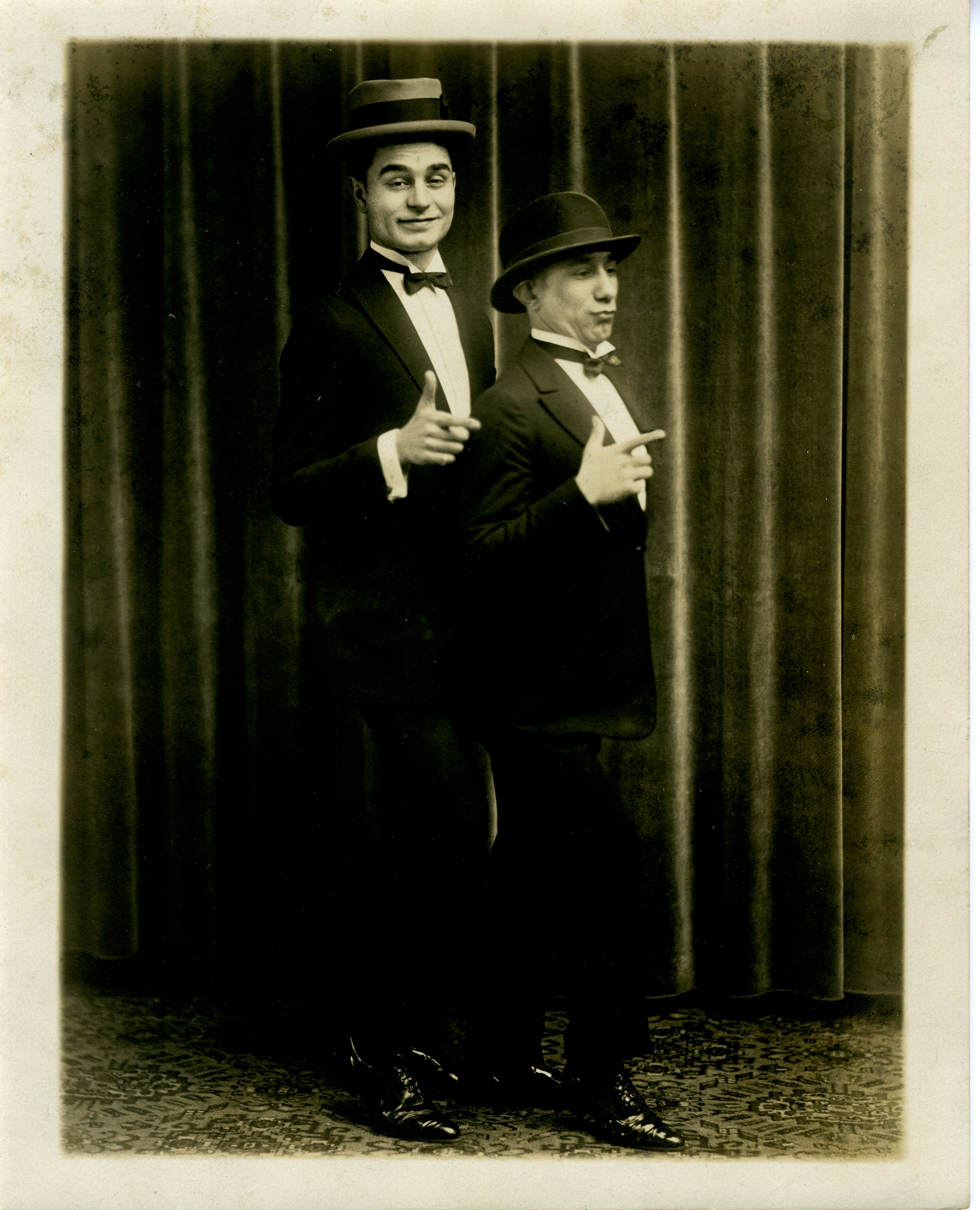
Andy Mayo and Al Morton of Morton and Mayo in 1925

Morton and Mayo were a Vaudeville dance and comedy duo from approximately the 1920s to the 1940s who were predominantly known for an artificial horse act known as Pansy the Horse. "Mayo" was Andy Mayo and "Morton" was portrayed by both Al Morton from 1923 to 1931 and by Nonnie Morton from 1931 to 1942.

== First Morton and Mayo (1918-1930) ==
Al Morton and Andy Mayo toured the United States on a variety of Vaudeville stages including the Orpheum Circuit in various singing, dancing and comedy shows. These shows would typically include a feature film presentation and several other live Vaudeville acts including dancing girls and a band. In 1925 they were featured in Chicago's Frolics cafe's Frivolous Frolics and toured the US as Two Nuts left over from xmas. In 1926 they traveled to Hawaii as the featured act in Maurice Kusel's Melody Maid Revue at Hawaii Theatre in Honolulu, HI. In 1930 they began acting as a three-person act with Al Morton (front) and Andy Mayo (rear) performing in a two-person artificial horse costume and a third female performer acting as the horse's trainer. The peak of the first Morton and Mayo's career was a Paramount Publix Theaters production that was devised and directed by Boris Petroff modeled after Noah's Ark and called Noah's Lark. Noah's Lark toured the United States for the last half of 1930 beginning in New York City. In New York, a rising Ethel Merman performed with the show in Brooklyn at the Brooklyn Paramount Theater.

After Noah's Lark, it appears Morton and Mayo appeared together as Pansy into early 1931 travelling to various US cities as a single act. The Pansy the horse act earned as much as $550/week in 1931.

== Second Morton and Mayo (1931-1942) ==
In 1931 Andy Mayo recruited Nonnie Morton out of high school to continue the Pansy the Horse act with him and his wife, Florence Mayo. Nonnie took the place of Al Morton in the front of the horse and Florence acted as the horse's trainer. Morton and Mayo toured Europe in 1937 and in 1942 starred in Billy Rose's Diamond Horseshoe club in New York, NY.

In 1943 Nonnie joined the army and continued his Vaudeville career raising money for war bonds.

== Andy Mayo ==
Andy Mayo was born Andrew C Guariglia on 1 August 1901 in Italy to Emil and Columbia Guariglia. In 1903 the family emigrated to Philadelphia, Pennsylvania, where they lived at 1330 Moore St in South Philadelphia, Pennsylvania. Mayo was the oldest of began his Vaudeville career in 1918 and took his stage name from his mother's maiden name, DiMaio. Andy became a naturalized citizen of the United States in 1918 and he toured on the Vaudeville stage circuit most of his life. He married and was divorced 1927, remarried to Florence Mayo on 7 January 1932 who performed with him throughout the remainder of his career. In 1938, with Florence attending to the birth of their first child, Mayo discovered Virginia Mayo in St Louis to take Florence's place as the female horse trainer. In 1939 Florence. Andy and Virginia Mayo were featured in the musical short Gallons and Guys. In 1943 Virginia Mayo's movie career started to gather attention and Andy left the Pansy the Horse act to manage the blossoming actress's career and leaving Pansy to his brother Allen and Frances Englebrecht in the horse costume and Dorthy Carlson as the trainer.

In 1944 Andy and Florence were featured as Pansy in the feature film Take it Big, costarring Jack Haley and Ozzie Nelson. Also in 1944, Pansy (with Connie Haas as the trainer) was part of the short Jazz on the Screen. This short film was released into the public domain.

Mayo died in Orange County, CA on 11 September 1983 at age 82.

== Al Morton ==
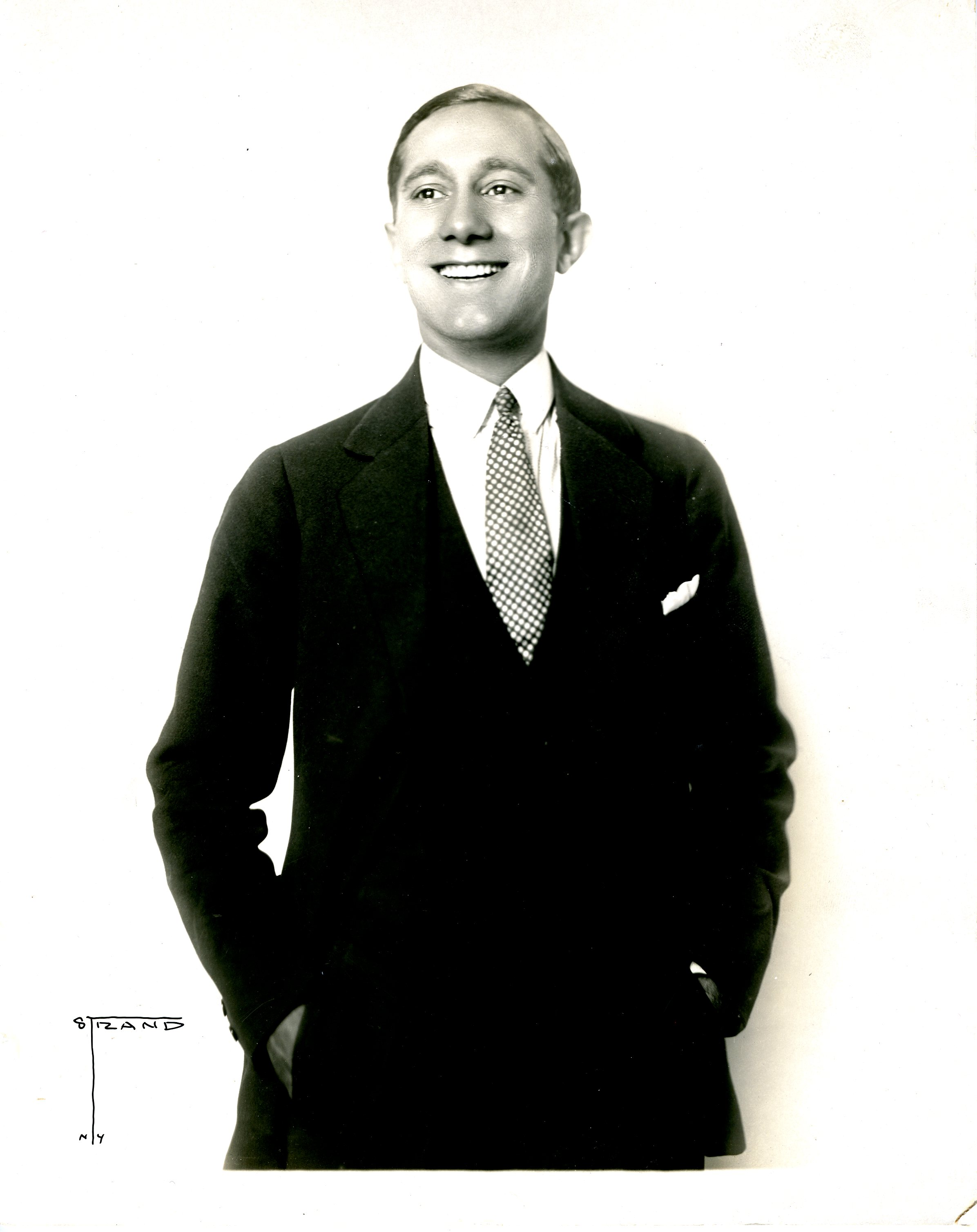
Al Morton in 1924

Al Morton was born Dominic Colafrancessco on 30 January 1899 as the 4th of 5 children born to Italian Immigrants named Joseph and Filomena (née DeCarlo) Colafrancesso of 602 League St, Philadelphia, PA. He toured throughout the United States from the early 1920s as a singer, actor and dancer. In 1927 he married Antoinette Gelone and starred in the Morton and Stanley Revue. In 1930 Al became the front half of the dancing horse act known as Pansy the Horse. After Morton and Mayo split up in 1931, Morton continued in a similar act known as Sparkplug the horse. In 1933 Al's health became an issue and he slowly gave up his career in Vaudeville. He died suddenly on the 4th of July in 1937 at age 38.

== Nonnie Morton ==
Nonnie Morton was born Dominic Anthony Rebecca in Philadelphia, Pennsylvania, on 5 July 1913 to Anthony and Rachel (Rae) (née Westle) Rebecca. Nonnie enlisted in the US Army on 23 January 1943 and was released on 9 March 1946 after spending 28 April 1945 to 2 March 1946 overseas. In the Army, Nonnie raised money for war bonds with various Vaudeville shows including Pennsylvania on Parade. Nonnie died on 26 April 2003 in Killeen, Texas.

== Vaudeville shows ==
Show	Year	Theater	City, state	Photos	Clippings
Frivolous Frolics	1925	Frolics Cafe	Chicago, Ill	Morton and Mayo as they appeared in Frivolous Frolics	News Clipping for Morton and Mayo 1925 - unknown source
Two Nuts Left Over from Xmas	1925	Numerous	Numerous	Morton and Mayo in Two Nuts Left Over from Christmas	
Melody Maid Revue	1926	Hawaii	Honolulu, HI	Melody Maid Revue Troupe	
Noah's Lark	1930	Numerous	1930-Noahs-Lark-Typed-Itinerary-001	1930-Noahs-Lark-Stage-Ensemble-Pansy-in-raincoat	
Pansy the horse	1930/31	Numerous	Detroit, Baltimore, Rochester and Syracuse	Typical Contract	
