= That Night! =

1957 film by John Newland

- Directed by: John Newland
- Screenplay by: Jack Rowles; Robert Wallace
- Story by: Jack Rowles; Robert Wallace
- Produced by: Himan Brown
- Starring: John Beal; Augusta Dabney; Shepperd Strudwick; Rosemary Murphy; Malcolm Brodrick
- Cinematography: Maurice Hartzband
- Edited by: David Cooper
- Music by: Mario Nascimbene
- Production companies: Galahad Productions; RKO Pictures
- Distributed by: Universal-International
- Release date: August 22, 1957
- Running time: 88 minutes
- Country: United States
- Language: English

That Night! is a 1957 American drama film directed by John Newland and written by Jack Rowles and Robert Wallace. The film stars John Beal, Augusta Dabney, Shepperd Strudwick, Rosemary Murphy and Malcolm Brodrick. The film was released on August 22, 1957 by Universal-International.

The film was nominated for the BAFTA Award for Best Film, won that year by The Bridge on the River Kwai, as well as a BAFTA Award for Best Actress in a Leading Role nomination for Dabney.

== Plot ==
Chris Bowden works at a New York City agency, writing commercials for television, and commutes to his Connecticut home daily on the train. One day, late for his daughter's birthday, Chris suffers a heart attack while aboard the train. An unscheduled stop is made to rush him to a hospital.

Although he is in his early 40s, Chris becomes concerned that his life could be near an end, particularly after a second attack. His wife Maggie also reevaluates her life, wondering if the stress of a marriage and work has led to this development. Each vows to reconsider what's important to them after Chris is finally released to come home.

== Cast ==
- John Beal as Commuter Christopher J. Bowden
- Augusta Dabney as Wife Maggie Bowden
- Shepperd Strudwick as Dr. Bernard Fischer
- Rosemary Murphy as Nurse 'Chorny' Chornis
- Malcolm Brodrick as Tommy Bowden
- Dennis Kohler as Chrissie Bowden
- Beverly Lunsford as Betsy Bowden
- Bill Darrid as Dr. Perroni
- Joseph Julian as Mr. Rosalie
- Staats Cotsworth as Salesman
- Peg Hillias as Doctor
- John McGovern as Ward Neighbor
- Mercer McLeod as Resident Doctor
- Vera Allen as Ward Nurse
- Floyd Ennis as Orderly
- Fran Bennett as Attendant
- Ray Doyle as Policeman
- Jackson Beck as Man on Train
- Leora Thatcher as Woman on Train
- Humphrey Davis as Conductor
- John Raby as Brakeman
- Sam Grey as Film Cutter
- Karl Swenson as McAdam
- Ann Loring as Mrs. McAdam
