= Augusta Dabney =

American actress (1918–2008)

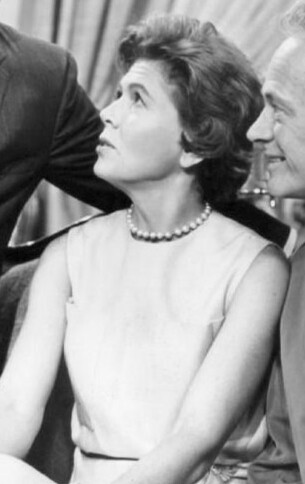
- Dabney in Young Doctor Malone in 1962
- Born: Augusta Keith Dabney; October 23, 1918; Berkeley, California, U.S.
- Died: February 4, 2008 (aged 89); Dobbs Ferry, New York, U.S.
- Occupation: Actress
- Years active: 1949–2001
- Spouses: Kevin McCarthy (m. 1941; div. 1964) William Prince (m. 1964; died 1996)
- Children: 3

Augusta Keith Dabney (October 23, 1918 – February 4, 2008) was an American actress known for her roles on many soap operas, such as the wealthy but kindly matriarch Isabelle Alden on the daytime series Loving. She played the role from 1983 to 1987, from 1988 to 1991, and again from 1994 to 1995.

== Early years ==
Dabney was born on October 23, 1918, the daughter of Thomas G. Dabney and Jessie Dabney. She was born and raised in Berkeley, California, and graduated from the University of California at Berkeley, where she was a member of Kappa Kappa Gamma sorority and two honor societies. In 1937, she moved to New York so that she could study at the American Academy of Dramatic Arts.

== Career ==
Dabney acted in stock theater and on Broadway. Her Broadway debut was in Abe Lincoln in Illinois (1938), and her final Broadway appearance was in Sacrilege (1995).

In the early days of live television, Dabney appeared in numerous episodes of such anthology drama series as Studio One, Kraft Television Theatre, and Robert Montgomery Presents. On November 21, 1950, she co-starred in "The Perfect Type" on Armstrong Circle Theatre.

She also had roles on numerous other daytime soaps, including Young Dr. Malone as leading character Tracey Malone, Another World as Laura Baxter (1964–1965), As the World Turns in two different roles, Love is a Many-Splendored Thing, Guiding Light as the original Barbara Norris (1970), A World Apart as leading character Betty Kahlman Barry (1970–1971), General Hospital as Lee Baldwin's second wife, Caroline Chandler (1975–1976), One Life to Live as Pat Kendall's mother, Helena Ashley (1979) and The Doctors as Theodora Van Allen (1980–1981).

Dabney's film debut came in That Night! (1957), and her final film appearance was in The Paper (1994).

== Personal life ==
On September 12, 1941, in New York City, Dabney married actor Kevin McCarthy, with whom she had three children. They were divorced in 1964. She was sister-in-law to writer Mary McCarthy during this marriage. Her second husband was actor William Prince. They were married from 1964 until his death in 1996. Dabney and Prince appeared together on at least four soaps: Young Dr. Malone (before their marriage), Another World, As the World Turns, and A World Apart. They also appeared together in one film, The Paper (1994), where they portrayed a married couple (the parents of the lead character, Henry Hackett, played by Michael Keaton). Her last performance was on an episode of 100 Centre Street (2001).

In 1957, Dabney was nominated for a BAFTA Award for Best Actress in a Leading Role for her starring performance in the film drama That Night.

== Death ==
Dabney died after an extended illness on February 4, 2008, aged 89, in Dobbs Ferry, New York.

== Filmography ==
Year	Title	Role	Notes
1957	That Night!	Wife Maggie Bowden	
1971	Plaza Suite	Mrs. Eisler	
1972	The Heartbreak Kid	Colorado Woman	
1977	Fire Sale	Mrs. Cooper	
1982	Cold River	Elizabeth Allison	
1986	Violets Are Blue	Ethel Sawyer	
1988	Shakedown	Judge Maynard	
1988	Running on Empty	Abigail Patterson	
1988	Bum Rap	Mon	
1994	The Paper	Sarah Hackett	
2000	Fear of Fiction	Mrs. Anderssen	
