= List of American films of 1960 =

More than 154 American feature films were released in 1960.

The Apartment won the Academy Award for Best Picture.

== A-C ==
Title	Director	Cast	Genre/Note	
The 3rd Voice	Hubert Cornfield	Edmond O'Brien, Laraine Day, Julie London	Mystery	20th Century Fox
12 to the Moon	David Bradley	Ken Clark, Tom Conway, Michi Kobi	Science fiction	Columbia
13 Fighting Men	Harry W. Gerstad	Grant Williams, Carole Matthews, Brad Dexter	War	20th Century Fox
13 Ghosts	William Castle	Charles Herbert, Jo Morrow, Rosemary DeCamp	Horror	Columbia; remade in 2001
The Adventures of Huckleberry Finn	Michael Curtiz	Tony Randall, Patty McCormack, Eddie Hodges, Archie Moore	Family	MGM. From Mark Twain book
The Alamo	John Wayne	John Wayne, Richard Widmark, Laurence Harvey, Chill Wills, Frankie Avalon, Richard Boone	Biography, Western	United Artists. 7 Oscar nominations
All the Fine Young Cannibals	Michael Anderson	Natalie Wood, Robert Wagner, George Hamilton	Drama	MGM
All the Young Men	Hall Bartlett	Alan Ladd, Sidney Poitier, James Darren	War	Columbia
The Amazing Transparent Man	Edgar G. Ulmer	Marguerite Chapman, Douglas Kennedy, James Griffith	Science fiction	AIP
The Angel Wore Red	Nunnally Johnson	Ava Gardner, Dirk Bogarde, Joseph Cotten	War	MGM
The Apartment	Billy Wilder	Jack Lemmon, Shirley MacLaine, Fred MacMurray, Ray Walston, Jack Kruschen, Edie Adams	Drama, Comedy	United Artists. 10 Oscar nominations; Best Picture
Because They're Young	Paul Wendkos	Dick Clark, Tuesday Weld, Victoria Shaw (actress)	Drama	Columbia
The Bellboy	Jerry Lewis	Jerry Lewis, Bob Clayton, Milton Berle	Comedy	Paramount
Bells Are Ringing	Vincente Minnelli	Judy Holliday, Dean Martin, Fred Clark	Musical comedy	MGM. Based on stage show
Beyond the Time Barrier	Edgar G. Ulmer	Darlene Tompkins, Robert Clarke, Vladimir Sokoloff	Sci-fi	AIP
The Big Night	Sidney Salkow	Venetia Stevenson, Randy Sparks, Dick Contino	Drama	Paramount
The Boy and the Pirates	Bert I. Gordon	Charles Herbert, Susan Gordon, Murvyn Vye	Adventure	United Artists
The Bramble Bush	Daniel Petrie	Richard Burton, Angie Dickinson, Barbara Rush	Drama	Warner Bros.
A Breath of Scandal	Michael Curtiz	Sophia Loren, Maurice Chevalier, John Gavin	Drama	Paramount
Butterfield 8	Daniel Mann	Elizabeth Taylor, Laurence Harvey, Eddie Fisher, Dina Merrill	Drama	MGM. Oscar for Taylor
Cage of Evil	Edward L. Cahn	Ron Foster, Pat Blair	Crime	United Artists
Can-Can	Walter Lang	Frank Sinatra, Shirley MacLaine, Maurice Chevalier, Louis Jourdan, Juliet Prowse	Musical	20th Century Fox. Based on stage show
The Cape Canaveral Monsters	Phil Tucker	Scott Peters, Jason Johnson	Science-fiction	
Cash McCall	Joseph Pevney	James Garner, Natalie Wood, Nina Foch, E. G. Marshall	Drama	Warner Bros.
Chartroose Caboose	William Reynolds	Molly Bee, Ben Cooper	Comedy	Universal
Cimarron	Anthony Mann	Glenn Ford, Maria Schell, Anne Baxter	Western	MGM. Remake of 1931 film
Cinderfella	Frank Tashlin	Jerry Lewis, Ed Wynn, Anna Maria Alberghetti	Musical comedy	Paramount
College Confidential	Albert Zugsmith	Steve Allen, Mamie Van Doren, Herbert Marshall, Jayne Meadows	Teen	Universal
Comanche Station	Budd Boetticher	Randolph Scott, Nancy Gates, Claude Akins	Western	Columbia
Crack in the Mirror	Richard Fleischer	Orson Welles, Juliette Gréco, Bradford Dillman	Drama	20th Century Fox
The Crowded Sky	Joseph Pevney	Dana Andrews, Rhonda Fleming	Drama	Warner Bros.

== D-H ==
Title	Director	Cast	Genre	Note
The Dark at the Top of the Stairs	Delbert Mann	Robert Preston, Dorothy McGuire, Eve Arden, Shirley Knight, Angela Lansbury	Drama	Warner Bros.; from William Inge play
Desire in the Dust	Robert L. Lippert	Raymond Burr, Martha Hyer, Joan Bennett	Drama	20th Century Fox
Dinosaurus!	Irvin Yeaworth	Ward Ramsey, Paul Lukather, Kristina Hanson	Sci-fi	Universal
Elmer Gantry	Richard Brooks	Burt Lancaster, Jean Simmons, Arthur Kennedy, Shirley Jones, Dean Jagger, Patti Page	Drama	United Artists. From novel by Sinclair Lewis; Oscars for Lancaster, Jones, screenplay
Esther and the King	Raoul Walsh	Joan Collins, Richard Egan, Denis O'Dea	Biblical	20th Century Fox
Exodus	Otto Preminger	Paul Newman, Eva Marie Saint, Ralph Richardson, Sal Mineo, Peter Lawford, Lee J. Cobb, Jill Haworth, Hugh Griffith, John Derek	Drama	United Artists. From the Leon Uris novel; 3 Oscar nominations
The Facts of Life	Melvin Frank	Bob Hope, Lucille Ball, Ruth Hussey	Comedy	United Artists. 5 Oscar nominations
Five Branded Women	Martin Ritt	Silvana Mangano, Jeanne Moreau, Vera Miles, Barbara Bel Geddes, Carla Gravina	War drama	Paramount
Five Guns to Tombstone	Edward L. Cahn	James Brown, Walter Coy	Western	United Artists
Flaming Star	Don Siegel	Elvis Presley, Steve Forrest, Barbara Eden, John McIntire, Dolores del Río, Richard Jaeckel	Western	20th Century Fox
Four Fast Guns	William J. Hole Jr.	Martha Vickers, James Craig	Western	Universal
Freckles	Andrew V. McLaglen	Carol Christensen	Drama	20th Century Fox
From the Terrace	Mark Robson	Paul Newman, Joanne Woodward, Myrna Loy, Ina Balin, Leon Ames, George Grizzard	Drama	20th Century Fox. From John O'Hara novel
G.I. Blues	Norman Taurog	Elvis Presley, Juliet Prowse, Robert Ivers, Leticia Roman	Musical	Paramount
The Gallant Hours	Robert Montgomery	James Cagney, Dennis Weaver	Biography, War	United Artists. Story of "Bull" Halsey
The Giant of Marathon	Jacques Tourneur	Steve Reeves, Mylène Demongeot, Sergio Fantoni	Epic	MGM
Girl of the Night	Joseph Cates	Anne Francis, Lloyd Nolan, Kay Medford	Drama	Warner Bros.
The Grass Is Greener	Stanley Donen	Cary Grant, Deborah Kerr, Robert Mitchum, Jean Simmons	Comedy	Universal. Based on the play
Gunfighters of Abilene	Edward L. Cahn	Buster Crabbe, Barton MacLane, Judith Ames	Western	United Artists
Guns of the Timberland	Robert D. Webb	Alan Ladd, Jeanne Crain, Gilbert Roland	Western	Warner Bros.
Hell Bent for Leather	George Sherman	Audie Murphy, Felicia Farr, Stephen McNally	Western	Universal
Hell to Eternity	Phil Karlson	Jeffrey Hunter, David Janssen, Vic Damone	War	Allied Artists
Heller in Pink Tights	George Cukor	Sophia Loren, Anthony Quinn, Margaret O'Brien, Steve Forrest	Western	Paramount
The High Powered Rifle	Maury Dexter	Allison Hayes, Willard Parker	Western	20th Century Fox
High Time	Blake Edwards	Bing Crosby, Fabian, Tuesday Weld, Nicole Maurey	Musical	20th Century Fox
Home from the Hill	Vincente Minnelli	Robert Mitchum, Eleanor Parker, George Peppard, George Hamilton	Drama	MGM. From William Humphrey novel
The Horse with the Flying Tail	Larry Lansburgh	George Fenneman (narrator)	Documentary	Academy Award winner
House of Usher	Roger Corman	Vincent Price, Mark Damon, Myrna Fahey	Horror	AIP
Hyde and Go Tweet	Friz Freleng		Animated	
The Hypnotic Eye	George Blair	Jacques Bergerac, Allison Hayes	Sci-fi	Allied Artists

== I-M ==
Title	Director	Cast	Genre	Note
I Aim at the Stars	J. Lee Thompson	Curd Jürgens, Herbert Lom, Gia Scala	Biography	Columbia. Based on life of Wernher von Braun; Co-production with United States
Ice Palace	Vincent Sherman	Richard Burton, Robert Ryan, Martha Hyer, Jim Backus, Carolyn Jones	Drama	Warner Bros. Based on a novel by Edna Ferber
I'll Give My Life	William F. Claxton	Angie Dickinson, Ray Collins	Drama	
Inherit the Wind	Stanley Kramer	Spencer Tracy, Fredric March, Gene Kelly, Harry Morgan, Claude Akins, Dick York	Drama	United Artists. Based on the play; 4 Oscar nominations
It Started in Naples	Melville Shavelson	Clark Gable, Sophia Loren, Vittorio De Sica	Romantic comedy	Paramount
Key Witness	Phil Karlson	Jeffrey Hunter, Pat Crowley, Dennis Hopper	Crime	MGM
The Last Voyage	Andrew L. Stone	Robert Stack, Dorothy Malone, George Sanders, Woody Strode, Jack Kruschen	Adventure	MGM
Last Woman on Earth	Roger Corman	Betsy Jones-Moreland, Antony Carbone, Robert Towne	Science-fiction	Filmgroup
The Leech Woman	Edward Dein	Grant Williams, Coleen Gray, Phillip Terry, Gloria Talbott	Science-fiction	Universal
Let's Make Love	George Cukor	Marilyn Monroe, Yves Montand, Tony Randall, Frankie Vaughan, Milton Berle, Gene Kelly, Bing Crosby	Musical comedy	20th Century Fox. Monroe's last musical
Let No Man Write My Epitaph	Philip Leacock	Burl Ives, Shelley Winters, James Darren, Jean Seberg	Drama	Columbia
The Little Shop of Horrors	Roger Corman	Jonathan Haze, Jackie Joseph, Mel Welles, Dick Miller, Jack Nicholson	Sci-fi comedy	remade in 1986
The Lost World	Irwin Allen	Michael Rennie, Jill St. John, David Hedison, Fernando Lamas, Claude Rains	Science-fiction	20th Century Fox
Macumba Love	Douglas Fowley	Walter Reed, Ziva Rodann	Horror	United Artists
The Magnificent Seven	John Sturges	Yul Brynner, Eli Wallach, Steve McQueen, Charles Bronson, Robert Vaughn, James Coburn, Brad Dexter, Horst Buchholz	Western	United Artists. Based on Seven Samurai; inspired 3 sequels and remake
Man on a String	André de Toth	Ernest Borgnine, Kerwin Mathews	Crime, Drama	Columbia; Remade in 1972
Mice Follies	Robert McKimson		Animated	
Midnight Lace	David Miller	Doris Day, Rex Harrison, John Gavin, Roddy McDowall, Myrna Loy	Suspense	Universal
Moment of Danger	Laszlo Benedek	Trevor Howard, Dorothy Dandridge	Drama	
The Mountain Road	Daniel Mann	James Stewart, Lisa Lu, Glenn Corbett, Harry Morgan	War	Columbia
Murder, Inc.	Stuart Rosenberg	Stuart Whitman, May Britt, Peter Falk, Henry Morgan	Crime	20th Century Fox
The Music Box Kid	Edward L. Cahn	Ron Foster, Luana Patten	Crime	United Artists

== N-S ==
Title	Director	Cast	Genre	Note
Never on Sunday	Jules Dassin	Melina Mercouri, Jules Dassin, Giorgos Fountas	Drama	United Artists. Greek/US production; 5 Oscar nominations
None but the Brave	George Sherman	Richard Basehart, Stuart Erwin, Arthur Shields	Western	20th Century Fox
Noose for a Gunman	Edward L. Cahn	Jim Davis, Lyn Thomas	Western	United Artists
North to Alaska	Henry Hathaway	John Wayne, Stewart Granger, Capucine, Fabian, Ernie Kovacs, Mickey Shaughnessy	Western comedy	20th Century Fox
Ocean's 11	Lewis Milestone	Frank Sinatra, Dean Martin, Sammy Davis Jr., Peter Lawford, Joey Bishop, Angie Dickinson, Richard Conte, George Raft, Cesar Romero, Henry Silva, Norman Fell	Crime, Drama	Rat Pack; Warner Bros.; remade in 2001
Oklahoma Territory	Edward L. Cahn	Bill Williams, Gloria Talbott, Ted de Corsia	Western	United Artists
Once More, with Feeling!	Stanley Donen	Yul Brynner, Kay Kendall, Gregory Ratoff	Comedy	Columbia; based on Henry Kurnitz play
One Foot in Hell	James B. Clark	Alan Ladd, Dan O'Herlihy	Western	20th Century Fox
Pay or Die	Richard Wilson	Ernest Borgnine, Zohra Lampert	Crime	Allied Artists
Pepe	George Sidney	Cantinflas, Dan Dailey, Shirley Jones	Comedy	Columbia
Platinum High School	Charles F. Haas	Mickey Rooney, Dan Duryea	Drama	MGM
Please Don't Eat the Daisies	Charles Walters	Doris Day, David Niven, Janis Paige	Comedy	MGM. From Jean Kerr book; inspired TV series
The Plunderers	Joseph Pevney	Jeff Chandler, John Saxon, Dolores Hart	Western	Allied Artists; Remake of 1948 film
Pollyanna	David Swift	Hayley Mills, Jane Wyman, Richard Egan, Karl Malden	Family comedy	from Eleanor Porter book; Disney
Portrait in Black	Michael Gordon	Lana Turner, Anthony Quinn, Richard Basehart, Sandra Dee, John Saxon	Suspense	Universal
Pretty Boy Floyd	Herbert J. Leder	John Ericson, Barry Newman	Drama	
The Private Lives of Adam and Eve	Mickey Rooney	Mickey Rooney, Mamie Van Doren, Mel Tormé, Tuesday Weld, Fay Spain, Paul Anka	Comedy	Universal
Private Property	Leslie Stevens	Corey Allen, Warren Oates	Crime drama	lost film, re-released 2016
The Purple Gang	Frank McDonald	Barry Sullivan, Robert Blake	Crime	Allied Artists
Psycho	Alfred Hitchcock	Anthony Perkins, Janet Leigh, Vera Miles, John Gavin, John McIntire, Martin Balsam	Suspense	Paramount. From Robert Bloch novel; remade in 1998
The Pusher	Gene Milford	Robert Lansing, Felice Orlandi	Crime	United Artists
The Rat Race	Robert Mulligan	Tony Curtis, Debbie Reynolds, Don Rickles	Drama	Paramount
Raymie	Frank McDonald	David Ladd, Julie Adams, Charles Winninger	Drama	Allied Artists
The Rise and Fall of Legs Diamond	Budd Boetticher	Ray Danton, Karen Steele, Elaine Stewart	Crime	Warner Bros. Based on Jack Diamond
The Savage Innocents	Nicholas Ray	Anthony Quinn, Peter O'Toole, Yoko Tani	Drama	Paramount
Scent of Mystery	Jack Cardiff	Denholm Elliott, Peter Lorre	Mystery	
The Secret of the Purple Reef	William Witney	Richard Chamberlain, Peter Falk, Margia Dean	Adventure	20th Century Fox
September Storm	Byron Haskin	Joanne Dru, Mark Stevens, Robert Strauss	Adventure	20th Century Fox. Filmed in 3-D
Sergeant Rutledge	John Ford	Jeffrey Hunter, Woody Strode, Constance Towers	Western	Warner Bros.
Seven Thieves	Henry Hathaway	Edward G. Robinson, Rod Steiger, Joan Collins	Film noir	20th Century Fox
Seven Ways from Sundown	Harry Keller	Audie Murphy, Barry Sullivan	Western	Universal
Sex Kittens Go to College	Albert Zugsmith	Mamie Van Doren, Tuesday Weld, John Carradine	Comedy	Allied Artists
Song Without End	Charles Vidor, George Cukor	Dirk Bogarde, Capucine, Patricia Morison	Biography	Columbia
Spartacus	Stanley Kubrick	Kirk Douglas, Laurence Olivier, Jean Simmons, Tony Curtis, Peter Ustinov, Charles Laughton, John Gavin, Woody Strode, John Ireland, John Dall	Epic	Universal; from Howard Fast novel; won 4 Oscars
Squad Car	Ed Leftwich	Vici Raaf, Paul Bryar	Crime	20th Century Fox
Stop!, Look and Laugh			Animated film	
The Story of Ruth	Henry Koster	Stuart Whitman, Tom Tryon, Peggy Wood, Elana Eden	Biblical	20th Century Fox
Strangers When We Meet	Richard Quine	Kirk Douglas, Kim Novak, Ernie Kovacs	Drama	Columbia
Studs Lonigan	Irving Lerner	Frank Gorshin, Jack Nicholson, Venetia Stevenson	Drama	United Artists
The Subterraneans	Ranald MacDougall	Leslie Caron, George Peppard, Janice Rule	Drama	MGM; based on Jack Kerouac book
Summer of the Seventeenth Doll	Leslie Norman	Ernest Borgnine, Anne Baxter, John Mills, Angela Lansbury	Adventure	set in Australia
The Sundowners	Fred Zinnemann	Deborah Kerr, Robert Mitchum	Drama	Warner Bros. Set in Australia; 5 Oscar nominations
Sunrise at Campobello	Vincent J. Donehue	Ralph Bellamy, Greer Garson	Biography	Warner Bros. Story of FDR
Swiss Family Robinson	Ken Annakin	John Mills, Dorothy McGuire, Tommy Kirk	Adventure	Disney

== T-Z ==
Title	Director	Cast	Genre	Note
Tall Story	Joshua Logan	Anthony Perkins, Jane Fonda, Ray Walston	Comedy	Warner Bros. Fonda's first film
Tarzan the Magnificent	Robert Day	Gordon Scott, Alexandra Stewart	Adventure	Paramount
A Terrible Beauty	Tay Garnett	Robert Mitchum, Anne Heywood, Dan O'Herlihy	Drama	United Artists
Tess of the Storm Country	Paul Guilfoyle	Diane Baker, Jack Ging	Drama	20th Century Fox
This Rebel Breed	Richard L. Bare	Rita Moreno, Gerald Mohr, Dyan Cannon	Crime drama	Warner Bros.
The Threat	Charles R. Rondeau	Robert Knapp, Linda Lawson, Mary Castle	Crime	Warner Bros.
The Three Worlds of Gulliver	Jack Sher	Kerwin Mathews, June Thorburn	Fantasy	Columbia. Based on Gulliver's Travels
Thunder in Carolina	Paul Helmick	Rory Calhoun, Connie Hines	Drama	
The Time Machine	George Pal	Rod Taylor, Sebastian Cabot, Yvette Mimieux, Alan Young	Science fiction	MGM. From H. G. Wells book; special effects Oscar
Three Came to Kill	Edward L. Cahn	Cameron Mitchell, Lyn Thomas	Crime	United Artists
Toby Tyler	Charles Barton	Kevin Corcoran	Family	Disney
Too Hot to Handle	Terence Young	Jayne Mansfield, Leo Genn, Karlheinz Böhm	Comedy	
Tormented	Bert I. Gordon	Richard Carlson, Lugene Sanders	Horror	Allied Artists
Twelve Hours to Kill	Edward L. Cahn	Nico Minardos, Barbara Eden, Russ Conway	Crime drama	20th Century Fox
The Unforgiven	John Huston	Burt Lancaster, Audrey Hepburn, Audie Murphy	Western	United Artists
Valley of the Redwoods	William Witney	John Hudson, Ed Nelson	Action	20th Century Fox
Vice Raid	Edward L. Cahn	Mamie Van Doren, Richard Coogan	Crime	United Artists
Village of the Damned	Wolf Rilla	George Sanders, Barbara Shelley, Martin Stephens	Horror, Sci-fi	MGM; Remade in 1995
Visit to a Small Planet	Norman Taurog	Jerry Lewis, Joan Blackman, Earl Holliman	Comedy	Paramount
The Wackiest Ship In the Army	Richard Murphy	Jack Lemmon, Ricky Nelson	Comedy	Columbia; became TV series
Wake Me When It's Over	Mervyn LeRoy	Ernie Kovacs, Dick Shawn, Margo Moore	Comedy	20th Century Fox
Walk Like a Dragon	James Clavell	Jack Lord, Nobu McCarthy, Mel Tormé	Drama	Paramount
Walk Tall	Maury Dexter	Willard Parker, Joyce Meadows	Western	20th Century Fox
The Walking Target	Edward L. Cahn	Joan Evans, Merry Anders	Crime	United Artists
The Wasp Woman	Roger Corman, Jack Hill	Susan Cabot, Anthony Eisley	Sci-fi	Filmgroup
Weddings and Babies	Morris Engel	Viveca Lindfors	Drama	20th Century Fox
Where the Boys Are	Henry Levin	George Hamilton, Connie Francis, Yvette Mimieux, Paula Prentiss	Comedy	MGM; Remade in 1984
Who Was That Lady?	George Sidney	Dean Martin, Tony Curtis, Janet Leigh	Comedy	Columbia; nominated for 2 Golden Globes
Why Must I Die?	Roy Del Ruth	Terry Moore, Debra Paget	Crime	A.I.P.
The Wild Ride	Harvey Berman	Jack Nicholson	Drama	
Wild River	Elia Kazan	Montgomery Clift, Lee Remick	Drama	20th Century Fox
The World of Suzie Wong	Richard Quine	William Holden, Nancy Kwan, Sylvia Syms	Romance	Paramount
Young Jesse James	William F. Claxton	Ray Stricklyn, Willard Parker, Merry Anders	Western	20th Century Fox
The Young One	Luis Buñuel	Zachary Scott, Bernie Hamilton	Drama	

== See also ==
- AFI Catalog of Feature Films
- 1960 in the United States
