= Frank Sully =

American actor (1908–1975)

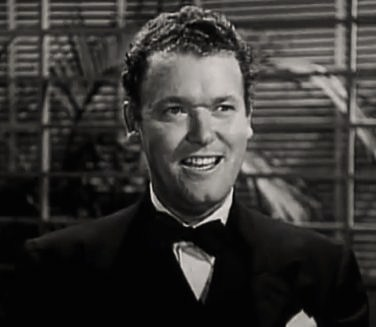
- Frank Sully in Let's Go Collegiate (1941)
- Born: Francis Thomas Sullivan; June 17, 1908; St. Louis, Missouri, U.S.
- Died: December 17, 1975 (aged 67); Los Angeles, California, U.S.
- Resting place: Forest Lawn Memorial Park, Long Beach, California
- Occupation: Actor
- Years active: 1934–1968

Francis Thomas Sullivan (June 17, 1908 – December 17, 1975), known professionally as Frank Sully, was an American film actor. He appeared in over 240 films between 1934 and 1968. Today's audiences know him best as the dumb detective in the Boston Blackie features, and as the foil in many Three Stooges comedies.

== Career ==
After working on the vaudeville stage, Sully entered the film industry in 1934. He played small parts and bits for several years at various studios, usually as tough guys. Gradually he was cast in higher-budgeted features, including Another Thin Man (1939) where Sully plays one of Nick Charles's streetwise pals, and John Ford's The Grapes of Wrath (1940) with Sully cast as Noah Joad, whose family treks across America for a new life.

Sully's first major role came in 1941 for Monogram Pictures, a "budget" studio that often gave opportunities to ambitious actors. In the Frankie Darro campus comedy Let's Go Collegiate, Sully was featured as a dumb truck driver recruited to masquerade as a star athlete. The role gave Sully good exposure, and the actor received excellent notices. The Exhibitor noted that "Sully takes acting honors, with Darro, (Keye) Luke, and (Jackie) Moran very good in their roles."

In 1942 Sully signed with Columbia Pictures. The studio had a company policy of casting its contract players in as many films as possible, regardless of class or budget, and Sully kept busy in dozens of Columbia's feature films, series comedies, westerns, and short subjects. When the studio's series of Boston Blackie comedy-mysteries needed a new sidekick for detective inspector Farraday (Richard Lane), Sully was recruited and remained in the role of the slow-witted "Matthews" until the end of the series in 1949.

In 1943 Sully began working in Columbia's two-reel comedy unit, where he remained a familiar presence off and on through 1957. He supported star comedians Hugh Herbert, Vera Vague, Slim Summerville, Wally Vernon and Eddie Quillan, Joe Besser, and most memorably The Three Stooges. Sully is featured in such Stooge comedies as Fling in the Ring, Pardon My Backfire, and Guns a Poppin!. He is most prominent in A Merry Mix Up as the bewildered waiter who thinks he's seeing triple; Sully also narrates the film.

=== Television ===
In addition to his film work, Sully also had bit parts in several television shows. Credits include Maverick, The Alfred Hitchcock Hour, Leave It to Beaver, I Love Lucy and The Beverly Hillbillies and "Charley" on Topper. Sully also had a recurring role as Danny the bartender on The Virginian.

== Death ==
Sully died on December 17, 1975, at the Motion Picture & Television Country House and Hospital. He is buried in Forest Lawn Memorial Park in Long Beach, California.

== Selected filmography ==
- Caravan (1934) .... Hungarian Soldier (uncredited)
- Murder at the Vanities (1934) .... Chorus Boy (uncredited)
- 365 Nights in Hollywood (1934) .... Mr. Sully, Student Actor (uncredited)
- Alibi Ike (1935) .... Ball Player (uncredited)
- Fighting Youth (1935) .... Football Player from St. Louis
- Mary Burns, Fugitive (1935) .... Steve
- Follow the Fleet (1936) .... Sailor (uncredited)
- Gentle Julia (1936) .... Mr. Toms
- Small Town Girl (1936) .... Bill (uncredited)
- Fury (1936) .... Dynamiter (uncredited)
- Poppy (1936) .... Bit part (uncredited)
- We Went to College (1936) .... Student as Othello (uncredited)
- Rhythm on the Range (1936) .... Splashed Rodeo Cowboy (uncredited)
- Theodora Goes Wild (1936) .... Clarence (uncredited)
- Black Legion (1937) .... Truck Driver's Helper (uncredited)
- Criminals of the Air (1937) .... Contact (uncredited)
- They Gave Him a Gun (1937) .... Comedy Soldier (uncredited)
- Captains Courageous (1937) .... Taxi Driver (uncredited)
- Riding on Air (1937) .... Harrison's Truck Driver (uncredited)
- High, Wide and Handsome (1937) .... Gabby Johnson (uncredited)
- White Bondage (1937) .... Man in Pool Room (uncredited)
- Life Begins in College (1937) .... Acting Captain
- Radio Patrol (1937) .... Flynn (uncredited)
- That's My Story (1937) .... Reporter (uncredited)
- Live, Love and Learn (1937) .... Marine (uncredited)
- Daughter of Shanghai (1937) .... Jake Kelly (uncredited)
- White Banners (1938) .... Butcher's Delivery Man (uncredited)
- Start Cheering (1938) .... Jimmy - Student Accosting Jean (uncredited)
- Test Pilot (1938) .... Pilot in Cafe (uncredited)
- The Crowd Roars (1938) .... Harry, Second Croquet Player (uncredited)
- Hold That Co-ed (1938) .... Steve
- Youth Takes a Fling (1938) .... Jim (uncredited)
- His Exciting Night (1938) .... Milk Truck Driver (uncredited)
- Thanks for Everything (1938) .... Lem Slininger
- Newsboys' Home (1938) .... Assistant to Hartley (uncredited)
- The Great Man Votes (1939) .... Policeman at Parade (uncredited)
- Society Lawyer (1939) .... First Cab Driver (uncredited)
- Sorority House (1939) .... The Caterer (uncredited)
- Some Like It Hot (1939) .... Sailor Burke / The Living Corpse
- Second Fiddle (1939) .... Townsman (uncredited)
- Mickey the Kid (1939) .... Curly (uncredited)
- Another Thin Man (1939) .... Pete, a Father (uncredited)
- The Night of Nights (1939) .... Taxi Driver (uncredited)
- The Grapes of Wrath (1940) .... Noah Joad
- The Fighting 69th (1940) .... Sergeant (uncredited)
- Castle on the Hudson (1940) .... Second Prisoner (uncredited)
- Women Without Names (1940) .... Friendly Motorist (uncredited)
- The Doctor Takes a Wife (1940) .... Slapcovitch
- Lillian Russell (1940) .... Hank
- Escape to Glory (1940) .... Tommy Malone
- I Can't Give You Anything But Love, Baby (1940) .... Henchman Wilky (uncredited)
- Cross-Country Romance (1940) .... Mike (motorcycle cop #2)
- The Return of Frank James (1940) .... Actor
- Young People (1940) .... Jeb
- He Stayed for Breakfast (1940) .... Butcher
- Yesterday's Heroes (1940) .... Curly Walsh
- City for Conquest (1940) .... Radio Listener (uncredited)
- Spring Parade (1940) .... Bert, Shawl Salesman (uncredited)
- Street of Memories (1940) .... Elliott (uncredited)
- Dr. Kildare's Crisis (1940) .... John Root (uncredited)
- Golden Hoofs (1941) .... Ed Muckle (uncredited)
- Nice Girl? (1941) .... Jake (uncredited)
- Murder Among Friends (1941) .... Service Station Attendant (uncredited)
- A Girl, a Guy, and a Gob (1941) .... Salty
- Double Date (1941) .... Hank
- The Flame of New Orleans (1941) .... Oyster Bed Cafe Waiter (uncredited)
- She Knew All the Answers (1941) .... Cop
- Mountain Moonlight (1941) .... Bill Jackson
- Private Nurse (1941) .... Eddie
- Let's Go Collegiate (1941) .... Hercules 'Herk' Bevans
- You'll Never Get Rich (1941) .... Robert's Guard (uncredited)
- The Body Disappears (1941) .... Rest Home Attendant (uncredited)
- You're in the Army Now (1941) .... Hog Caller (uncredited)
- All Through the Night (1942) .... Spence
- Sleepytime Gal (1942) .... Dimples
- Rings on Her Fingers (1942) .... Taxi Driver
- True to the Army (1942) .... Mugg
- To the Shores of Tripoli (1942) .... Truck Driver (uncredited)
- Two Yanks in Trinidad (1942) .... Mike Paradise
- Inside the Law (1942) .... Jim Burke
- Yankee Doodle Dandy (1942) .... Army Recruiter (uncredited)
- Parachute Nurse (1942) .... Sergeant Peters
- The Talk of the Town (1942) .... Policeman in Station Wagon (uncredited)
- A Man's World (1942) .... Sammy Collins
- My Sister Eileen (1942) .... Jenson
- Lucky Legs (1942) .... Mugg (uncredited)
- Daring Young Man (1942) .... Luke
- The Boogie Man Will Get You (1942) .... Police Officer Joe Starrett (uncredited)
- Laugh Your Blues Away (1942) .... Buck
- One Dangerous Night (1943) .... Hertzog, Henchman
- Power of the Press (1943) .... Mack Gibbons (uncredited)
- They Got Me Covered (1943) .... Red
- Murder in Times Square (1943) .... Benny the Baboon (Snake Exhibit Owner) (uncredited)
- Redhead from Manhattan (1943) .... Henchman (uncredited)
- The More the Merrier (1943) .... FBI Agent Pike
- It's a Great Life (1943) .... Elevator Starter (uncredited)
- Two Señoritas from Chicago (1943) .... Bruiser
- Good Luck, Mr. Yates (1943) .... Joe Briggs
- Thousands Cheer (1943) .... Alan
- Dangerous Blondes (1943) .... Detective Joe Henderson
- There's Something About a Soldier (1943) .... Alex Grybinski
- The Ghost That Walks Alone (1944) .... Beppo
- "Bachelor Daze" (1944, Short) .... Ezra's Neighbor
- Two Girls and a Sailor (1944) .... Private Adams
- Secret Command (1944) .... Shawn
- Boston Blackie Booked on Suspicion (1945) .... Sergeant Matthews
- Boston Blackie's Rendezvous (1945) .... Detective Sergeant Matthews
- Along Came Jones (1945) .... Avery de Longpre
- I Love a Bandleader (1945) .... Dan Benson
- Out of the Depths (1945) .... 'Speed' Brogan
- One Way to Love (1946) .... Hopkins
- A Close Call for Boston Blackie (1946) .... Sergeant Matthews
- The Gentleman Misbehaves (1946) .... Taxi Driver
- Throw a Saddle on a Star (1946) .... Lawyer
- Talk About a Lady (1946) .... Rocky Jordan
- The Phantom Thief (1946) .... Detective Sergeant Matthews
- Renegades (1946) .... Link
- Dangerous Business (1946) .... Bert
- It's Great to Be Young (1946) .... Burkett
- Crime Doctor's Man Hunt (1946) .... Rigger
- Boston Blackie and the Law (1946) .... Sergeant Matthews
- South of the Chisholm Trail (1947) .... Big Jim Grady (uncredited)
- Wild Harvest (1947) .... Nick
- Trapped by Boston Blackie (1948) .... Sergeant Matthews
- Blondie's Reward (1948) .... Officer Carney
- Let's Live a Little (1948) .... Artist (uncredited)
- Gun Smugglers (1948) .... Corporal Clancy
- Boston Blackie's Chinese Venture (1949) .... Detective Sergeant Matthews
- Joe Palooka in the Counterpunch (1949) .... Looie
- Trapped (1949) .... Sam, Bartender (uncredited)
- Tell It to the Judge (1949) .... Waiter (uncredited)
- Bodyhold (1949) .... 'Killer' Cassidy
- Joe Palooka Meets Humphrey (1950) .... Looie
- Blondie's Hero (1950) .... Mike McClusky, the Snorer (uncredited)
- Killer Shark (1950) .... Patrick, bartender (uncredited)
- The Good Humor Man (1950) .... Cop (uncredited)
- Square Dance Katy (1950) .... Workman
- Beauty on Parade (1950) .... Murph
- The Reformer and the Redhead (1950) .... Joe, Cop with Blackeye (uncredited)
- Joe Palooka in Humphrey Takes a Chance (1950) .... Looie
- When You're Smiling (1950) .... Cab Driver (uncredited)
- Rookie Fireman (1950) .... Charlie
- Watch the Birdie (1950) .... Street Construction Workman (uncredited)
- Prairie Roundup (1951) .... Sheriff (uncredited)
- Father's Little Dividend (1951) .... Infant Service Diaper Man (uncredited)
- The Big Gusher (1951) .... Barfly (uncredited)
- Rich, Young and Pretty (1951) .... Legionnaire (uncredited)
- The Tall Target (1951) .... Telegram Messenger (uncredited)
- Rhubarb (1951) .... Big Head Charlie, Bookie (uncredited)
- The People Against O'Hara (1951) .... Fishmonger (uncredited)
- The Red Badge of Courage (1951) .... Veteran (uncredited)
- Behave Yourself! (1951) .... Bill's Taxi Driver (uncredited)
- Let's Make It Legal (1951) .... Laborer (uncredited)
- Man in the Saddle (1951) .... Lee Repp
- I Want You (1951) .... Bartender (uncredited)
- Mutiny (1952) .... Crewman (uncredited)
- The Sniper (1952) .... Man at Carnival Dunking Concession (uncredited)
- Night Stage to Galveston (1952) .... Policeman Kelly
- With a Song in My Heart (1952) .... Vociferous Texan G.I. (uncredited)
- No Room for the Groom (1952) .... Cousin Luke
- Young Man with Ideas (1952) .... Salesman (uncredited)
- The Girl in White (1952) .... Pool Player (uncredited)
- Pat and Mike (1952) .... Photographer (uncredited)
- Washington Story (1952) .... Bystander (uncredited)
- Rainbow 'Round My Shoulder (1952) .... Harry (uncredited)
- Down Among the Sheltering Palms (1953) .... Sergeant (uncredited)
- Man in the Dark (1953) .... Yellow Cab Driver (uncredited)
- Take Me to Town (1953) .... Sammy, Stagehand (uncredited)
- Northern Patrol (1953) .... Bartender
- Pardon My Backfire (1953, Short) .... Algernon, Escaped Convict
- Bad for Each Other (1953) .... Tippy Kashko, Townsman
- The Battle of Rogue River (1954) .... Private Kohler
- Loophole (1954) .... Charlie, Cab Driver (uncredited)
- Massacre Canyon (1954) .... Army Private (uncredited)
- Silver Lode (1954) .... Paul Herbert, Telegrapher
- The Law vs. Billy the Kid (1954) .... Deputy Jack Poe (uncredited)
- Fling in the Ring (1955, Short) .... Big Mike
- Women's Prison (1955) .... Frank, Turnkey (uncredited)
- Wyoming Renegades (1955) .... Williams (uncredited)
- The Man from Bitter Ridge (1955) .... Billy Bundy (uncredited)
- Jungle Moon Men (1955) .... Max
- Seminole Uprising (1955) .... Sergeant (uncredited)
- Bring Your Smile Along (1955) .... Call Boy (uncredited)
- Apache Ambush (1955) .... Pioneer (uncredited)
- The Naked Street (1955) .... Nutsy (uncredited)
- Blunder Boys (1955, Short) .... Watts D. Matter (uncredited)
- The Tender Trap (1955) .... Doorman (uncredited)
- Last of the Desperados (1955) .... Tim, Murder Victim (uncredited)
- The Spoilers (1955) .... Miner (uncredited)
- The Adventures of Rin-Tin-Tin (1955) (Season 1 Episode 34: "The Lonesome Road") .... Detective
- Fury at Gunsight Pass (1956) .... Frank (uncredited)
- The Houston Story (1956) .... Taxicab Driver (uncredited)
- Flagpole Jitters (1956, Short) .... Jim (uncredited)
- Frontier Gambler (1956) .... Bartender
- The Unguarded Moment (1956) .... Taxi Driver (uncredited)
- You Can't Run Away from It (1956) .... Red
- Friendly Persuasion (1956) .... Rebel Looter (uncredited)
- The Desperados Are in Town (1956) .... Carl Branch
- A Merry Mix Up (1957, Short) .... Waiter / Narrator (uncredited)
- Guns a Poppin (1957, Short) .... Sheriff
- The Buckskin Lady (1957) .... Jed
- The Helen Morgan Story (1957) .... Vendor (scenes deleted)
- Pal Joey (1957) .... Barker (uncredited)
- Rockabilly Baby (1957) .... Bum
- Domino Kid (1957) .... Red - Bartender (uncredited)
- Cheyenne (1957-1961) (2 episodes)
  - (Season 2 Episode 16: "The Brand") (1957) .... Bartender
  - (Season 6 Episode 2: "Trouble Street") (1961) .... Counterman
- Maverick (1957-1961) (6 episodes)
  - (Season 1 Episode 1: "War of the Silver Kings") (1957) .... Arthur
  - (Season 1 Episode 2: "Point Blank") (1957) .... Poker Player
  - (Season 2 Episode 2: "The Lonesome Reunion") (1958) .... Townsman
  - (Season 4 Episode 13: "Dodge City or Bust") (1960) .... Stableman
  - (Season 4 Episode 19: "Dutchman's Gold") (1961) .... Bartender
  - (Season 5 Episode 3: "The Golden Fleecing") (1961) .... Wilson
- The Female Animal (1958) .... Taxicab Driver (uncredited)
- Return to Warbow (1958) .... Bartender (uncredited)
- Man from God's Country (1958) .... Trail Cook (uncredited)
- The Last Hurrah (1958) .... Fire Lieutenant (uncredited)
- Tales of Wells Fargo (1958) (Season 2 Episode 36: "The Renegade") .... Laramie Wells Fargo Agent
- Wagon Train (1958-1962) (2 episodes)
  - (Season 1 Episode 25: "The Marie Dupree Story") .... Pietro Vandero
  - (Season 5 Episode 17: "The Malachi Hobart Story") .... Wagon Train Member
- Alfred Hitchcock Presents (1959-1961) (2 episodes)
  - (Season 5 Episode 3: "Appointment at Eleven") (1959) .... Piano Player
  - (Season 6 Episode 21: "The Kiss-Off") (1961) .... Desk Clerk
- The Rifleman (1959) (Season 1 Episode 27: "The Wrong Man") .... Carnival Barker
- The Gunfight at Dodge City (1959) .... Drunken Cowboy Who Throws Bottle (uncredited)
- Let No Man Write My Epitaph (1960) .... Drunk at Bar (uncredited)
- The Alfred Hitchcock Hour (1962) (Season 1 Episode 9: "The Black Curtain") .... The Drunk
- Gypsy (1962) .... Wichita Burlesque Audience Member (uncredited)
- The Virginian (1963-1967) (25 episodes)
  - (Season 1 Episode 26: "Echo of Another Day) .... Danny
- Bye Bye Birdie (1963) .... Maude's Bartender (uncredited)
- Zebra in the Kitchen (1965) .... Motorist Surrounded by Elephants (uncredited)
- Alvarez Kelly (1966) .... Prisoner (uncredited)
- The Beverly Hillbillies (1966) (Season 5 Episode 12: "The Gloria Swanson Story") .... Second Mover
- The Wild Wild West (1967) (Season 2 Episode 28: "The Night of the Bogus Bandits") .... Telegrapher
- Funny Girl (1968) .... Bartender (uncredited) (final film role)
