= Russ Bender =

American actor (1910–1969)

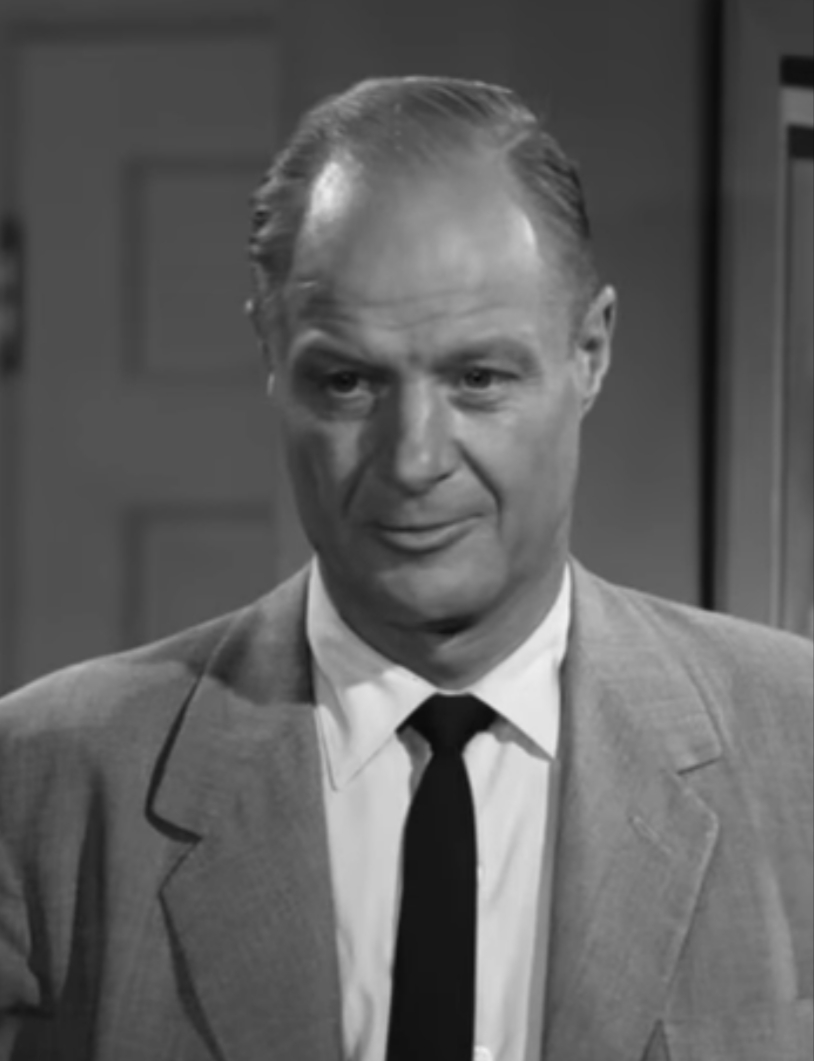
- Bender in Anatomy of a Psycho (1961)
- Born: January 1, 1910
- Died: August 16, 1969 (aged 59)
- Occupation: Actor
- Years active: 1952–1969

Russ Bender (January 1, 1910 – August 16, 1969) was an American actor.

== Career ==
Before becoming an actor, Bender wrote detective stories for magazines. That part of his life was interrupted when he joined the Army. By the time he returned to civilian life, the market for such material had decreased. At that point, he became an actor, appearing in the Gunsmoke episode “Gold Mine” (S11E15 of 1965). Even then, he continued to write to some extent, creating script for five films as well as "numerous television scripts". He frequently appeared in B-movies, and often worked with director Maury Dexter.

== Filmography ==
He appeared in the films

- 1952: Paula - Cop (uncredited)
- 1953: The War of the Worlds - Dr. Carmichael (uncredited)
- 1956: It Conquered the World - Brig. Gen. James Pattick
- 1957: Kelly and Me - Police Captain (uncredited)
- 1957: Dragstrip Girl - Police Lt. Bradley
- 1957: Badlands of Montana - George Johannson
- 1957: Beau James - Reporter (uncredited)
- 1957: Invasion of the Saucer Men - Doctor
- 1957: Man of a Thousand Faces - Divorce Judge (uncredited)
- 1957: The Joker Is Wild - Man in Hotel Suite (uncredited)
- 1957: The Amazing Colossal Man - Richard Kingman
- 1958: Motorcycle Gang - Lt. Joe Watson
- 1958: Cowboy - Joe (uncredited)
- 1958: Flood Tide - Surgeon (uncredited)
- 1958: Suicide Battalion - Sgt. Harry Donovan
- 1958: War of the Colossal Beast - Dr. Carmichael
- 1958: I Bury the Living - Henry Trowbridge (uncredited)
- 1958: Hot Rod Gang - Bill
- 1958: The Restless Years - Tom Mitchell (uncredited)
- 1959: No Name on the Bullet - Storekeeper
- 1959: Compulsion - Edgar Llewellyn - Attorney (uncredited)
- 1959: Ghost of Dragstrip Hollow - Tom Hendry
- 1959: Vice Raid - Drucker (uncredited)
- 1960: Walk Tall - Col. Stanton
- 1961: The Little Shepherd of Kingdom Come - Col. Jackson
- 1961: The Big Bankroll - Racetrack Official (uncredited)
- 1961: Anatomy of a Psycho - Frank
- 1961: The Purple Hills - Deputy Marshal
- 1961: Lover Come Back - Mr. Gates - Partner in Advertising Company (uncredited)
- 1962: That Touch of Mink - Williams (uncredited)
- 1962: Panic in Year Zero! - Harkness
- 1962: Air Patrol - Sgt. Lou Kurnitz
- 1962: Hemingway's Adventures of a Young Man - Serviceman at Train Station (uncredited)
- 1962: Days of Wine and Roses - (uncredited)
- 1963: A Gathering of Eagles - Col. Torrance
- 1964: The Brass Bottle - Official (uncredited)
- 1964: A Tiger Walks - Frightened Hunter (uncredited)
- 1964: The Strangler - Dr. Clarence Sanford
- 1964: Raiders from Beneath the Sea - Tucker
- 1965: The Satan Bug - Mason (uncredited)
- 1965: I Saw What You Did - Police Sgt. Harris
- 1965: Wild on the Beach - Shep Kirby
- 1965: Space Probe Taurus - Dr. Paul Martin
- 1966: The Navy vs. the Night Monsters - Chief Warr. Off. McBride
- 1967: Devil's Angels - Royce
- 1968: Maryjane - Harry Braxton
- 1968: Wild in the Streets - Politician at Meeting (uncredited)
- 1968: Live a Little, Love a Little - Editor (uncredited)
- 1968: The Young Animals - Coach Simms

== Television ==
Year	Title	Role	Notes
1953	You Are There	Nathaniel Cary	S1:E9, "The Witch Trial at Salem, Massachusetts (August 1692)"
1956	Highway Patrol	Dr. Walters	S2:E6, "Typhoid Carrier"
1956	The Millionaire	Burns	S3:E12, "The Harvey Borden Story"
1956	The Life and Legend of Wyatt Earp	Deacon	S2:E3, "Fight or Run"
1957	The Adventures of Jim Bowie	Captain Gunderson	S1:E31, "The Pearl and the Crown"
1957	The Californians	Prospector	S1:E1, "The Vigilantes Begin"
1957	The Californians	Steve Thompson	S1:E2, "All That Glitters"
1957	Code 3	Lieutenant Al Byrne	S1:E31, "Harbor Incident"
1957	The Millionaire	Fred	S4:E9, "The Frank Keegan Story"
1957	The Sheriff of Cochise	Paul Orville	S2:E39, "Federal Witness"
1957	The Gray Ghost	Lane	S1:E2, "The Missing Colonel"
1957	Broken Arrow	Marshal	S1:E20, "Powder Keg"
1957	Broken Arrow	Marshal	S1:E29, "The Assassin"
1957	Telephone Time	Sheriff	S2:E23, "The Intruder"
1957	Colt .45	Townsend	S1:E11, "The Gypsies"
1957	The Life and Legend of Wyatt Earp	Hanford Craig	S2:E29, "Young Gun"
1958	Sugarfoot	Sheriff	S1:E10, "Bullet Proof"
1958	The Adventures of McGraw	Prison Official	S1:E30, "Time for Dying"
1958	Broken Arrow	Marshal	S2:E17, "Bad Boy"
1958	Maverick	Doctor	S1:E21, "Trail West to Fury"
1958	Telephone Time	Matt Heller	S3:E29, "Trail Blazer"
1958	Whirlybirds	Tom Baker	S2:E16, "Blind Date"
1958	Alcoa Theatre	Perkins	S1:E16, "The Perfectionist"
1958	M Squad	Police Lt. Dan Casey	S1:E37, "The Woman from Paris"
1958	The Silent Service	Messecar the Cook	S2:E17, "The Cavalla Story"
1958	Trackdown	Sheriff John Kemp	S1:E13, "The Reward"
1958	Trackdown	Townsman	S2:E7, "Matter of Justice"
1958	The Rough Riders	Colonel Rayford	S1:E6, "The Governor"
1958	U.S. Marshal	Mike Lynch	Episode: "Highway Robbery"
1958	The Veil	Calvin Logan	S1:E3, "Food on the Table"
1958	Men of Annapolis	Colonel Keller	S1:E29, "Rapid Fire"
1958	The Life and Legend of Wyatt Earp	Lem Evans	S4:E13, "Plague Carrier"
1958	77 Sunset Strip	Humphries	S1:E4, "Casualty"
1958	Wanted: Dead or Alive	Sheriff	S1:E5, "Passing of Shawnee Bill"
1958	Wanted: Dead or Alive	Sam Cameron	S1:E14, "Die by the Gun"
1958	Have Gun - Will Travel	Wilbur Macon	S1:E24, "Girl from Piccadilly"
1958	Gunsmoke	Dealer	S3:E21, "Ma Tennis"
1959	Frontier Doctor	Frank Saunders	S1:E24, "The Big Gamblers"
1959	The Ann Sothern Show	Doctor	S1:E23, "Katy's Big Surprise"
1959	Richard Diamond, Private Detective	Sheriff	S3:E10, "Two for Paradise"
1959	Colt .45	Stagedoor Man	S2:E5, "The Man Who Loved Lincoln"
1959	Zane Grey Theatre	Judge Langford Peel	S3:E29, "The Law and the Gun"
1959	The David Niven Show	Detective	S1:E12, "The Vengeance"
1959	Markham	Ronnie Evans	S1:E17, "Deadline Date"
1959	Cheyenne	Sheriff Edwards	S4:E6, "Prisoner of Moon Mesa"
1959	Black Saddle	Denham Talbot	S1:E19, "Client: Reynolds"
1959	The Deputy	Jordan	S1:E10, "The Big Four"
1959	77 Sunset Strip	Captain Bradford	S1:E13, "Hit and Run"
1959	Rawhide	Storekeeper	S1:E22, "Incident of a Burst of Evil"
1959	Perry Mason	Sgt. Givens	S2:E25, "The Case of the Petulant Partner"
1959	Laramie	Sheriff	S1:E12, "Man of God"
1960	Johnny Ringo	Jason	S1:E14, "East Is East"
1960	The Life and Legend of Wyatt Earp	Horace Granby	S5:E24, "The Case of Senor Huerto"
1960	Black Saddle	Jack Dutro	S2:E17, "The Indian Tree"
1960	The Deputy	Bert	S1:E23, "The Two Faces of Bob Claxton"
1960	Overland Trail	Stagecoach Driver	S1:E6, "All the O'Mara's Horses"
1960	Hotel de Paree	Willie Barnes	S1:E23, "Sundance and the Black Widow"
1960	Hotel de Paree	Willie	S1:E28, "Sundance and the Good-Luck Coat"
1960	77 Sunset Strip	Chief Bob Howard	S2:E36, "Family Skeleton"
1960	Wanted: Dead or Alive	Sheriff Tom Brice	S3:E3 "Journey for Josh"
1960	The Tall Man	Townsman	S1:E5, "The Lonely Star"
1960	Thriller	Arresting Officer	S1:E3, "Worse Than Murder"
1960	Lassie	Dr. Hayden	S7:E11, "Visiting Colt"
1960	Rawhide	Sheriff	S3:E9, "Incident of the Captive"
1960	Perry Mason	Policeman	S4:E2, "The Case of the Credulous Quarry"
1960	Laramie	Hotel Clerk	S2:E3, "Three Rode West"
1960	The Twilight Zone	Counterman	S1:E16, "The Hitch-Hiker"
1960	Death Valley Days	Billy Rogers	S8:E34, "Human Sacrifice"
1961	Thriller	Burdett	S1:E18, "Man in the Cage"
1961	The Untouchables	George Cooper	S2:E15, "The Organization"
1961	Gunslinger	Hanton	S1:E1, "The Buried People"
1961	Coronado 9	Ted Bowen	S1:E28, "Three's a Shroud"
1961	Lassie	Dr. Hayden	S7:E30, "Long Chase"
1961	Shannon	Elliot Humphrey	S1:E2, "The Embezzler's Daughter"
1961	Rawhide	Gilmore	S4:E9, "The Little Fishes"
1961	Have Gun - Will Travel	Doctor	S4:E28, "The Siege"
1961	Perry Mason	Chief Hagerty	S4:E20, "The Case of the Barefaced Witness"
1962	Have Gun - Will Travel	Arthur - Beatrice's Husband	S5:E29, "Silent Death, Secret Death"
1962	Perry Mason	Deputy Bowman	S5:E27, "The Case of the Counterfeit Crank"
1962	Leave It to Beaver	Mr. Barnsdall	S6:E3, "Wally's License"
1962	Dr. Kildare	Government Man	S2:E3, "The Visitors"
1962	The Beachcomber	Brink	S1:E38, "Roll of Thunder"
1962	The Twilight Zone	Doctor	S3:E25, "The Fugitive"
1962	The Virginian	Todd	S1:E11, "The Devil's Children"
1963	Laramie	Red Wheeler	S4:E17, "The Wedding Party"
1963	The Twilight Zone	Hank	S4:E16, "On Thursday, We Leave for Home"
1963	Breaking Point	Police Sergeant	S1:E14, "Heart of Marble, Body of Stone"
1963	Ben Casey	Mr. Martin	S3:E16, "The Last Splintered Spoke on the Old Burlesque Wheel"
1963	Kraft Suspense Theatre	Sergeant Aikes	S1:E7, "The Machine That Played God"
1963	The Virginian	Bartender	S2:E6, "It Takes a Big Man"
1963	Death Valley Days	Judge	S12:E4, "Diamond Field Jack"
1963	Bonanza	Walt	S5:E7, "Calamity Over the Comstock"
1964	Kraft Suspense Theatre	Sergeant Pingitore	S1:E24, "The Sweet Taste of Vengeance"
1964	My Three Sons	Carl Pendleton	S5:E2, "A Serious Girl"
1964	The Virginian	The Land Office Clerk	S3:E15, "A Man of the People"
1964	Gunsmoke	Store Proprietor	S10:E4, "The Violators"
1964	Bonanza	Station Master	S5:E30, "Enter Thomas Bowers"
1964	Bonanza	George	S6:E5, "Logan's Treasure"
1965	The Fugitive	Timekeeper	S2:E20, "Scapegoat"
1965	The Farmer's Daughter	Richwood	S2:E31, "Never Listen to Rumors"
1965	The Virginian	Doc Linell	S4:E8, "Nobility of Kings"
1965	Gidget	Tacky	S1:E11, "My Ever Faithful Friend"
1965	Gunsmoke	Sheriff	S11:E15, "Gold Mine"
1966	Iron Horse	Costello	S1:E8, "War Cloud"
1967	The F.B.I.	Boat Owner	S2:E22, "The Hostage"
1967	Cimarron Strip	Mort	S1:E7, "Whitey"
1967	Mission: Impossible	Duty Guard	S2:E9, "The Seal"
1967	Iron Horse	Sergeant	S2:E14, "Wild Track"
1967	Death Valley Days	Hoffman	S15:E18, "A Wrangler's Last Ride"
1968	Green Acres	Sheriff	S3:E18, "Home Is Where You Run Away From"
1968	Death Valley Days	Dr. Harper	S16:E15, "Dress for a Desert Girl"
1968	Death Valley Days	Ceasar Twitchell	S16:E21, "A Friend Indeed"
1969	The Big Valley	Driver	S4:E13, "Top of the Stairs"
1969	Petticoat Junction	Farmer	S6:E22, "Uncle Joe Retires"
1969	Bonanza	Garvey	S10, E26, "The Running Man"

== Books ==
Russell Bender, Shag & Bones: The Complete Series (Steeger Books, 2023); intro by John Wooley
