= Woman Hunt =

Woman Hunt may refer to:

- Womanhunt, 1962 American crime film
- The Woman Hunt, 1972 American action film shot in the Philippines
