= Ivan Bonar =

American actor (1924–1988)

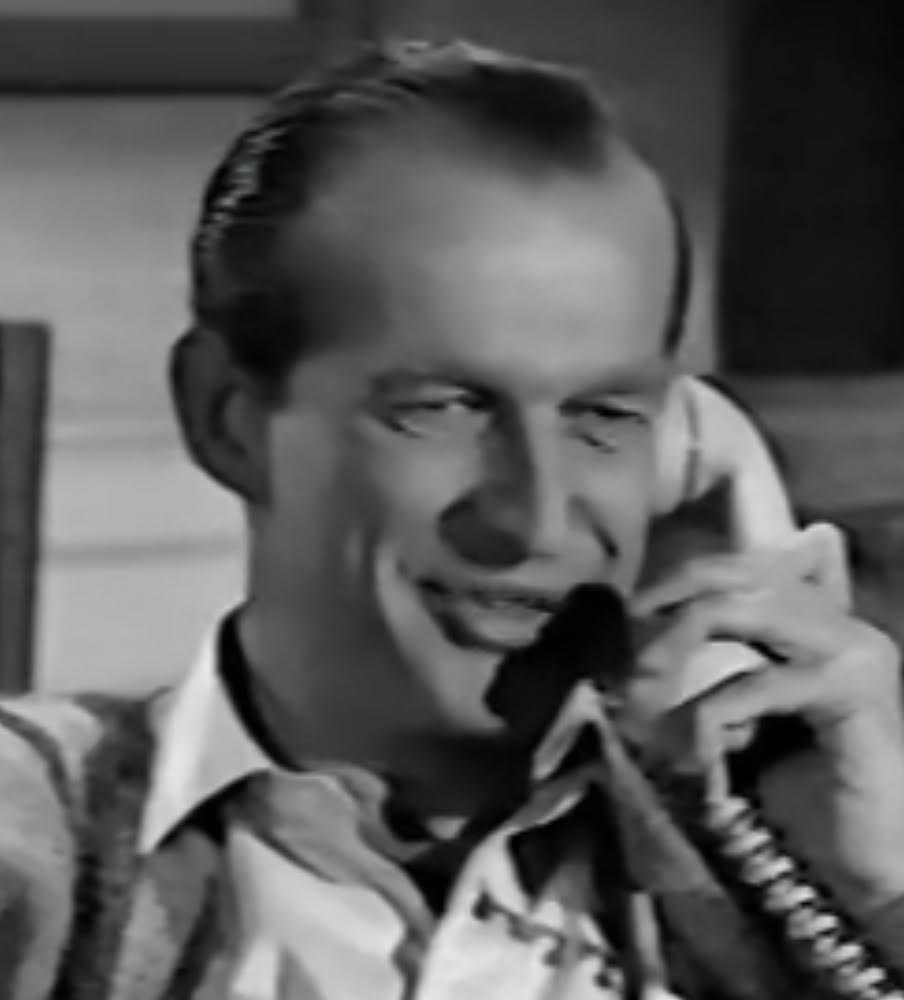
- Bonar in an episode of The Adventures of Ozzie and Harriet (1964)
- Born: Ivan Eugene Bonar; October 31, 1924; New London, Iowa, U.S.
- Died: December 8, 1988 (aged 64); Los Angeles, California, U.S.
- Occupation(s): Actor, Voice Actor/Artist
- Years active: 1958–1988

Ivan Eugene Bonar (October 31, 1924 – December 8, 1988) was an American character actor whose career in Hollywood, in films and television, spanned four decades, from the mid 1950s into the 1980s.

== Life and career ==
A vaunted character actor, Bonar appeared in the play The Country Girl. He also made appearances in many films, such as Night of the Quarter Moon (1959), Air Patrol and Womanhunt (1962), Gable and Lombard (1976), MacArthur (1977), where he played U.S. Army Lt. General Richard K. Sutherland, Same Time Next Year (1978, with Alan Alda and Ellen Burstyn) and the 1983 made-for-TV movie Rita Hayworth: The Love Goddess as Hollywood film director Howard Hawks.

Bonar is perhaps better known for his career in television, as he guest starred in episodes of many hit TV series such as The Adventures of Ozzie and Harriet, McHale's Navy, Perry Mason, Dennis the Menace, the ABC-TV version of My Three Sons, I Dream of Jeannie, where he served as the voice of the announcer in one episode, The Partridge Family, and the NBC-TV series Ironside, amongst many other appearances which continued into the 1980s, on such shows as Dallas, Dynasty, and Hart to Hart. From 1966 to 1971, and then 1973 to 1979, he had a recurring role as Chase Murdock on the ABC-TV daytime soap opera series General Hospital. In 1973, he appeared in Hawkins: Death and the Maiden, a TV movie that served as the pilot for the series Hawkins starring James Stewart.

== Death ==
Bonar died in 1988 in Los Angeles.

== Filmography ==
Year	Title	Role	Notes
1959	Night of the Quarter Moon	Photographer	Uncredited
1962	Womanhunt	Jacobs	
1962	Air Patrol	Oliver Dunning	
1963	Police Nurse	Dr. C. F. Sears	
1965	Love and Kisses	Assemblyman Potter	
1967	Hotel	Silverstein	Uncredited
1967	Countdown	Nogrady	Uncredited
1968	Maryjane	Roger Campbell	
1968	Project X	Col. Cowen	
1976	Gable and Lombard	Brogan	
1977	MacArthur	General Sutherland	
1978	Same Time Next Year	Chalmers	
1980	Getting Wasted	Dr. Carson	
1982	Tag: The Assassination Game	Patterson	
1982	Waltz Across Texas	A.J. Profit	
1983	Over Here, Mr. President		
1989	Animal Behavior	Dr. Ridley	(final film role)
