= The Vanquished =

1953 film by Edward Ludwig

- Theatrical release poster
- Directed by: Edward Ludwig
- Screenplay by: Lewis R. Foster; Winston Miller; Frank L. Moss
- Based on: story by Karl Brown
- Produced by: William H. Pine; William C. Thomas
- Starring: John Payne; Jan Sterling; Coleen Gray; Lyle Bettger; Willard Parker; Roy Gordon; John Dierkes
- Cinematography: Lionel Lindon
- Edited by: Frank Bracht
- Music by: Lucien Cailliet
- Production company: Pine-Thomas Productions
- Distributed by: Paramount Pictures
- Release date: June 3, 1953
- Running time: 84 minutes
- Country: United States
- Language: English

The Vanquished is a 1953 American Western film directed by Edward Ludwig, written by Lewis R. Foster, Winston Miller and Frank L. Moss, and starring John Payne, Jan Sterling, Coleen Gray, Lyle Bettger, Willard Parker, Roy Gordon and John Dierkes. It was released on June 3, 1953, by Paramount Pictures.

== Plot ==
The war over, civil administrator Roger Hale has become the scourge of the Southern town of Galeston, exacting his own kind of justice. He and his ex-prostitute lover Rose Slater also have moved into the Grayson manor, childhood home of Rockwell Grayson, who has been away fighting in the war.

After ostensibly going to see inspector general Hildebrandt to request he investigate Hale's activities, Rock instead returns to form an alliance with Hale, offering to become his tax collector and siding with him publicly against the townspeople. Jane Colfax, his former sweetheart, is shocked by Rock's behavior, as are others.

Rose's greed leads her to purchase a nearby plantation with Hale's ill-gotten gains and offer to cut Rock in on their profits. She also persuades Hale to sign a document bequeathing his possessions to her should anything happen to him.

Rock is revealed to be working undercover on the general's behalf, gaining information to use against Hale. A former union officer, Kirby, learns of Rock's real mission. Rock is shot and reveals his true purpose to Jane, who forgives him and threatens Rose with a pair of scissors. Rose then shoots Hale, possibly by mistake, possibly not. Rock gets the better of Kirby and reunites with Jane.

== Cast ==
- John Payne as Rockwell 'Rock' Grayson
- Jan Sterling as Rose Slater
- Coleen Gray as Jane Colfax
- Lyle Bettger as Roger Hale
- Willard Parker as Captain Kirby
- Roy Gordon as Doctor Colfax
- John Dierkes as General Morris
- Charles Evans as General Hildebrandt
- Strother Martin as Scott
- Ellen Corby as Mrs. Barbour
- Ernestine Barrier as Mrs. Colfax
- Russell Gaige as Reverend Babcock
- Leslie Kimmell as Colonel Ellansby
- Voltaire Perkins as Harvey Giddens
- Sam Flint as Connors
- Freeman Morse as Randy Williams
- Denver Pyle as Fairchild
- Richard Shannon as Lieutenant Adams
- Karen Sharpe as Lucy Colfax

== Production ==
In May 1951 Pine-Thomas Productions signed a contract with Paramount to turn out at least eight films in 1952 and 1953. The proposed projects included an adaptation of the unpublished novel The Rebel by Karl Brown. They also signed a contract with John Payne to make six films in three years.

In April 1952 it was announced Pine-Thomas would make the film as Thunderbolt and it would star Payne and Arlene Dahl, who had just made Caribbean for Pine-Thomas. The film would be the second of a three-picture deal Dahl had signed with the company. It was described as a "Scarlet Pimpernel of the south". Edward Ludwig signed to direct.

By June the film's title had been changed to The Lion's Share and then Violence at Thunder Run. Dahl had dropped out and Jan Sterling and Colleen Grey signed to co star.

The film was also known as The Conquerors, and Brazen.

Filming took place in August 1952 under a new title Rock Grayson's Women. In December the title was changed yet again, to The Vanquished.

== Comic book adaptation ==
- Eastern Color Movie Love #22 (August 1953)
