= Emergency Wedding =

1950 film by Edward Buzzell

- Directed by: Edward Buzzell
- Written by: Nat Perrin; Claude Binyon
- Produced by: Nat Perrin
- Starring: Larry Parks; Barbara Hale; Willard Parker
- Cinematography: Burnett Guffey
- Edited by: Al Clark
- Music by: Werner R. Heymann
- Production company: Columbia Pictures
- Distributed by: Columbia Pictures
- Release date: November 15, 1950
- Running time: 78 minutes
- Country: United States
- Language: English

Emergency Wedding (titled Jealousy in the UK) is a 1950 American comedy film directed by Edward Buzzell and starring Larry Parks, Barbara Hale and Willard Parker. It is a remake of You Belong to Me (1941), a film in which Parks had also appeared.

== Plot ==
Dr. Helen Hunt is a physician married to millionaire Peter Judson Kirk Jr., who is jealous that his wife is spending too much time with her male patients. He makes a fool of himself trying to prove her guilt, which causes her to leave. But when he donates funds for a new hospital, she returns to him.

== Cast ==
- Larry Parks as Peter Judson Kirk
- Barbara Hale as Dr. Helen Hunt
- Willard Parker as Vandemer
- Una Merkel as Emma
- Alan Reed as Tony
- Eduard Franz as Dr. Heimer
- Irving Bacon as Filbert - Mechanic
- Don Beddoe as Forbish - Floorwalker
- Jim Backus as Ed Hamley
- Vince Gironda as Gym Guy

== Reception ==
In a contemporary review for The New York Times, critic A. H. Weiler wrote: "'Emergency Wedding,' except for a titter or two and an attempt to diagnose what ails organized medicine, is an unimpressive reproduction. ... 'Emergency Wedding,' to render a terse diagnosis, is not precisely what the doctor ordered."
