= Father Is a Bachelor =

1950 film by Abby Berlin

- Directed by: Abby Berlin; Norman Foster
- Screenplay by: Aleen Leslie; James Edward Grant
- Story by: James Edward Grant
- Produced by: S. Sylvan Simon
- Starring: William Holden; Coleen Gray
- Cinematography: Burnett Guffey
- Edited by: Jerome Thoms
- Music by: Arthur Morton
- Color process: Black and white
- Production company: Columbia Pictures
- Distributed by: Columbia Pictures
- Release date: February 22, 1950
- Running time: 84 minutes
- Country: United States
- Language: English

Father Is a Bachelor is a 1950 American musical romantic comedy film directed by Abby Berlin and Norman Foster. It stars William Holden and Coleen Gray.

== Plot ==
Carefree vagabond Johnny Rutledge lives in a small town after his medicine show employer and friend Professor Mordecai Ford is arrested. He befriends a young girl named May Chalotte and her older brothers January ("Jan"), February ("Feb") and twins March and April. Jan received word six months before that their parents had died in a riverboat accident, but has not told anybody but Feb, and now Johnny, fearing they would be sent to an orphanage. Johnny makes it clear that he is adamantly opposed to taking on any responsibilities, but somehow finds himself becoming their "uncle" anyway. He works on a farm during the week, and sings and waits tables on Sunday in a restaurant owned by Jericho Schlosser to provide for the children.

When Prudence Millett, daughter of the local judge, comes to inquire why the boys are not in school, Johnny is forced to claim he is their uncle. A romance begins to blossom, despite his strong aversion to being tied down. (He had worked to drag himself out of poverty to half-ownership of a paper mill, only to have his partner abscond with all the company funds, so he gave up being a responsible citizen.)

When wealthy, unloved Jeffrey Gilland Sr. orders Johnny to keep his disreputable children away from his son Jeffrey Jr., Johnny scuffles with him and gets arrested. Prudence posts his bond, but his troubles are not over. Plato Cassin, Gilland's lawyer, finds out about the children's parents and blackmails Johnny into agreeing to marry one of his older, spinster sisters, Genevieve and Adelaide, in order to keep the kids. (Adelaide wins a game of quoits for the privilege.) Plato convinces Prudence that Johnny was using the children to court her.

After thinking it over, Johnny decides to leave with the now-released Ford. May overhears and invites people to her birthday party the next day, intending it to be a going-away party for Johnny. Meanwhile, Johnny dissuades Gilland's young son from running away himself. At the party, a grateful Gilland drops the charges against him.

When May asks why Prudence cannot be her aunt instead of Adelaide, the young woman is quite willing, having seen how far Johnny is willing to go for the children. Johnny tells Adelaide that he loves Prudence. She proves to be a sport and the two women gamble for him. Ford offers what he, Johnny, and Jan believe is Johnny's two-headed coin. Prudence wins the toss. Later, Johnny is shocked to learn that they inadvertently used a regular coin. Ford leaves town, leaving Johnny with his new family.

== Cast ==
- William Holden as Johnny Rutledge
- Coleen Gray as Prudence Millett
- Mary Jane Saunders as May Chalotte
- Charles Winninger as Professor Mordecai Ford
- Stuart Erwin as Constable Pudge Barnham
- Clinton Sundberg as Plato Cassin
- Gary Gray as Jan Chalotte
- Sig Ruman as Jericho Schlosser
- Billy Gray as Feb Chalotte
- Lloyd Corrigan as Judge Millett
- Frederic Tozere as Jeffrey Gilland Sr.
- Peggy Converse as Genevieve Cassin
- Lillian Bronson as Adelaide Cassin

== Songs ==
Johnny sings a number of songs in the film, including "Wait 'Till the Sun Shines, Nellie" in blackface in the opening scene. His singing was dubbed by Buddy Clark.

== Reception ==
Bosley Crowther called the film a "saccharine, paper-thin little romance" in his New York Times review.
