= Bandit Queen (1950 film) =

1950 film by William A. Berke

- The Bandit Queen with her avenging bullwhip
- Directed by: William Berke
- Written by: Orville H. Hampton (additional dialogue)
- Screenplay by: Victor West; Budd Lesser
- Story by: Victor West
- Produced by: William Berke executive Robert L. Lippert; Murray Lerner
- Starring: Barbara Britton; Willard Parker; Phillip Reed
- Cinematography: Ernest Miller (as Ernest W. Miller)
- Edited by: Carl Pierson
- Music by: Albert Glasser
- Production company: Lippert Pictures
- Distributed by: Lippert Pictures
- Release dates: December 9, 1950 (Premiere); December 22, 1950 (United States)
- Running time: 70 minutes
- Country: United States
- Language: English

Bandit Queen is a 1950 American black-and-white Western film directed by William Berke and starring Barbara Britton and Phillip Reed as two Robin Hood-type bandits.

Set near Madera, California during the California Gold Rush, the film includes a fictional depiction of legendary bandit Joaquin Murrieta (Reed).

== Plot ==
Zara Montalvo, the daughter of an American father and Spanish mother, returns to California from abroad and witnesses her parents' murder at the hands of a gang. On the advice of Father Antonio, she approaches sheriff Jim Harden for help, but recognizes him as one of the murderers. She assumes the alias of Lola Belmont and teams with Joaquin Murietta, who uses the name Carlos del Rio.

Attorney Dan Hinsdale informs Zara that he has purchased her family's rancho at a reduced fee because of back taxes owed by Zara's parents. Father Antonio warns Zara that her outlaw gang is wanted by the authorities. Upon learning this, Zara and Joaquin secretly work to regain stolen gold and land rights on the behalf of other neighboring rancheros.

== Cast ==
- Barbara Britton as Zara Montalvo/Lola Belmont
- Willard Parker as Dan Hinsdale
- Phillip Reed as Joaquin Murietta/Carlos del Rio
- Barton MacLane as Jim Harden
- Martin Garralaga as Father Antonio
- Victor Kilian as Jose Montalvo
- Thurston Hall as Governor
- Angelo Rossitto as Nino
- Anna Demetrio as Maria
- Paul Marion as Manuel
- Mikel Conrad as Captain Gray
- Margia Dean as Carol Grayson
- Minna Phillips as Mrs. Grayson
- John Merton as Hank

== Production ==
Bandit Queen was produced by Lippert Pictures and shot in the Vasquez Rocks Natural Area Park as well as in the San Fernando Valley.

Production took place from mid-September to early October 1950.

Martha Vickers was initially slated to play the lead female role but was forced to withdraw because she had recently given birth and her doctor feared the effects of acting in a rugged Western on her 98-pound body. Barbara Britton was cast in her place.

== See also ==
- 1950 in film
- Cinema of the United States
- Lady Robinhood
- List of American films of 1950
- Queen of Swords (TV series)
- Senorita (1927 film)
- Zorro's Black Whip
