= Renegades (1946 film) =

1946 film by George Sherman

- Directed by: George Sherman
- Screenplay by: Melvin Levy; Francis Edward Faragoh
- Story by: Harold Shumate
- Produced by: Michael Kraike
- Starring: Evelyn Keyes; Willard Parker; Larry Parks; Edgar Buchanan
- Cinematography: William E. Snyder
- Edited by: Charles Nelson
- Music by: Paul Sawtell
- Color process: Technicolor
- Production company: Columbia Pictures
- Distributed by: Columbia Pictures
- Release date: June 13, 1946 (United States)
- Running time: 88 minutes
- Country: United States
- Language: English

Renegades is a 1946 American Technicolor Western film directed by George Sherman and starring Evelyn Keyes, Willard Parker, Larry Parks and Edgar Buchanan. It was produced and distributed by Columbia Pictures.

== Plot ==
Western of a girl who marries the son of an outlaw, but when he is killed in a fight, she marries the ever loving doctor.

== Cast ==
- Evelyn Keyes as Hannah Brockway
- Willard Parker as Dr. Sam Martin
- Larry Parks as Ben Dembrow / Ben Taylor
- Edgar Buchanan as Kirk Dembrow
- Jim Bannon as Cash Dembrow
- Forrest Tucker as Frank Dembrow
- Ludwig Donath as Jackorski
- Frank Sully as Link
- Willard Robertson as Nathan Brockway
- Paul E. Burns as Alkali Kid

== See also ==
- List of American films of 1946
