= Willard Parker =

American actor (1912–1996)

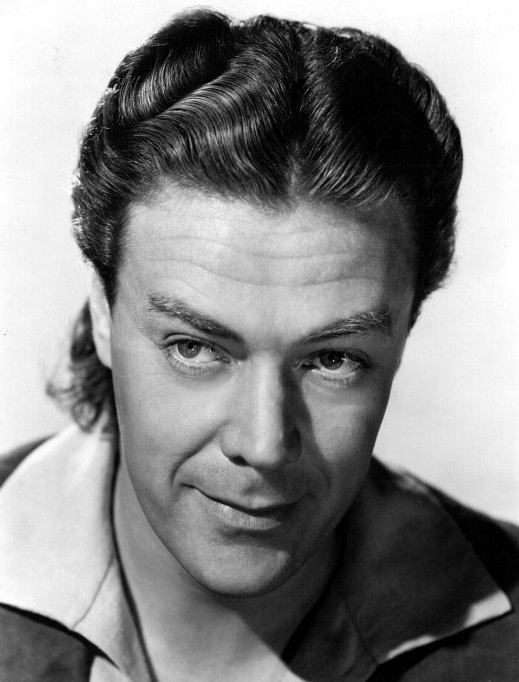
- Parker in The Fighting Guardsman (1946)
- Born: Worster Van Eps; February 5, 1912; New York City, U.S.
- Died: December 4, 1996 (aged 84); Rancho Mirage, California, U.S.
- Occupation: Actor
- Years active: 1937–1972
- Spouses: Marion Pierce (m. 1939; div. 1951) Virginia Field (m. 1951; died 1992)
- Children: 1

Willard Parker (born Worster Van Eps; February 5, 1912 – December 4, 1996) was an American film and television actor. He starred in the TV series Tales of the Texas Rangers (1955–1958).

== Biography ==
Parker was born in New York City. Some sources report his birth name as Worcester. He was a meter reader and a tennis pro. While working as the latter in Hollywood he was spotted by Zeppo Marx, then working as an agent. Marx arranged a screen test and he signed a contract with Warner Bros. He changed his name to "Willard Parker".

=== Warner Bros ===
Parker signed to Warner Bros in the late 1930s. He made his debut with an uncredited bit in the Dick Foran Western, The Devil's Saddle Legion (1937). He had small parts in That Certain Woman (1937) with Bette Davis; Back in Circulation (1937) with Pat O'Brien; the short subject Love is on the Air (1937) with Ronald Reagan; Alcatraz Island (1937) with John Litel; Over the Goal (1937) with June Travis; The Adventurous Blonde (1937) with Glenda Farrell; Missing Witnesses (1937) with Litel; and The Invisible Menace (1938) with Boris Karloff.

Parker's first notable film role was in A Slight Case of Murder (1938) with Edward G. Robinson. He followed it with Accidents Will Happen (1938) with Reagan, but then left the studio.

Parker went to Republic Pictures for The Zero Hour (1939). At Paramount he had a minor role in The Magnificent Fraud (1939).

=== Broadway ===
Parker decided to go to the stage to hone his acting skills. He worked for a stock company then tried Broadway, where he had a role in a hit play, Johnny Belinda (1940) by Elmer Rice. He then replaced Victor Mature in the cast of the musical Lady in the Dark (1941) opposite Gertrude Lawrence. He went with the show when it toured on the road in 1943. This brought him to the attention of executives at Columbia Pictures who signed him to a long-term contract.

=== Columbia ===
Parker was the second male lead in What a Woman! (1943), a romantic comedy with Rosalind Russell and Brian Aherne.

His career was interrupted by service with the US Marines. Then when he returned Columbia promoted him to leading man status in the swashbuckler The Fighting Guardsman (1946). Then they starred him in a comedy One Way to Love (1946); and a Western, Renegades (1946).

These films were not particularly successful and Parker went back to being the third lead in Relentless (1948), a Western, and in The Mating of Millie (1948), he was billed after Glenn Ford, Evelyn Keyes and Ron Randell. Columbia tried him in the lead of a drama, The Wreck of the Hesperus (1948).

Universal borrowed him for a support role in You Gotta Stay Happy (1948) with Joan Fontaine and James Stewart. Back at Columbia he supported Don Ameche and Dorothy Lamour in the musical Slightly French (1949). Universal borrowed him for another support part, this time in the Yvonne De Carlo Western Calamity Jane and Sam Bass (1949).

Columbia gave him the lead in some "B"s, Bodyhold (1949), as a wrestler, with Lola Albright; and David Harding, Counterspy (1950), playing the title role. He played the third lead in the comedy Emergency Wedding (1950), supporting Larry Parks and Barbara Hale.

Parker went to Lippert Pictures to make Bandit Queen (1950), co-starring with Barbara Britton.

For RKO he did Hunt the Man Down (1951) then he made another for Columbia, My True Story (1951), playing the male lead under the direction of Mickey Rooney.

Universal used Parker as the third lead in the Western Apache Drums (1951). He had support roles in three films for Pine-Thomas Productions, Caribbean Gold (1952), Sangaree (1953) and The Vanquished (1953). He guest-starred on TV in The Adventures of Ellery Queen (1952).

Parker returned to leads with the role of Jesse James in The Great Jesse James Raid (1953) for Lippert Pictures. He had a small role in Kiss Me Kate (1953)at MGM.

=== Television ===
Parker and his wife Virginia Field appeared in "Mr. And Mrs. Trubble" for Schlitz Playhouse (1952). That show invited him back for "Twenty-two Sycamore Road" (1953, with Nancy Reagan), "Little War at San Dede" (1954), and "Visitor in the Night" (1955).

He also guest-starred on Fireside Theatre in "A Mother's Duty" (1954) and "No Time for Susan" (1955, with his wife), and The Ford Television Theatre in "Kiss and Forget" (1953, with his wife), and "The Mumbys" (1955, with his wife).

Parker was cast as Ranger Jace Pearson in the 52-episode CBS television series, Tales of the Texas Rangers, which aired from 1955 to 1958. His co-star was Harry Lauter as Ranger Clay Morgan. The series was rerun thereafter on ABC.

Parker starred in low-budget Western for Fox, Naked Gun (1956), and Lure of the Swamp (1957). He guest-starred in Lee Marvin's NBC crime drama, M Squad (1958) then starred in some low budget Westerns, Lone Texan (1959), Young Jesse James (1960) and Walk Tall (1960). He did "Dr Kate" for Westinghouse Desilu Playhouse (1960). Walk Tall was directed by Maury Dexter who used Parker in The High Powered Rifle (1961) and Air Patrol (1962).

=== Later career ===
He guest-starred in ABC's religion drama series, Going My Way, starring Gene Kelly and Leo G. Carroll as Roman Catholic priests in New York City. Parker was cast as Msgr. Joe Giblin in the 1962 episode, "The Crooked Angel."

He had the lead in the British film The Earth Dies Screaming (1964) and was one of many names in Waco (1966).

== Personal life ==
Parker was married to Marion Pierce from 1939 to 1951. They had one child. They were divorced, and Parker was married to Virginia Field from 1951 until her death in 1992.

Parker died of a heart attack at the age of 84 in Rancho Mirage in Riverside County, California.

== Partial filmography ==
- The Devil's Saddle Legion (1937) - Hub Ordley
- That Certain Woman (1937) - Reporter (uncredited)
- Back in Circulation (1937) - Ben (uncredited)
- Love Is on the Air (1937) - Les Quimby
- Alcatraz Island (1937) - Reporter (uncredited)
- Over the Goal (1937) - Duke Davis
- The Adventurous Blonde (1937) - Clerk (uncredited)
- Missing Witnesses (1937) - Hotel Clerk (uncredited)
- The Invisible Menace (1938) - Pvt. Booker (uncredited)
- A Slight Case of Murder (1938) - Dick Whitewood
- Accidents Will Happen (1938) - Gas Station Attendant (uncredited)
- The Zero Hour (1939) - Lansdowne
- The Magnificent Fraud (1939) - Airline Steward (uncredited)
- What a Woman! (1943) - Michael Cobb
- The Fighting Guardsman (1946) - Baron Francois de St.-Hermain, alias Roland the Bandit
- One Way to Love (1946) - Mitchell Raymond
- Renegades (1946) - Dr. Sam Martin
- The Wreck of the Hesperus (1948) - John Macready
- Relentless (1948) - Jeff Moyer
- The Mating of Millie (1948) - Phil Gowan
- You Gotta Stay Happy (1948) - Henry Benson
- Slightly French (1949) - Douglas Hyde
- Calamity Jane and Sam Bass (1949) - Sheriff William 'Will' Egan
- Bodyhold (1949) - Tommy Jones
- The Secret Fury (1950) - Smith (uncredited)
- David Harding, Counterspy (1950) - Lt. Comdr. Jerry A. Baldwin
- Emergency Wedding (1950) - Vandemer
- The Bandit Queen (1950) - Dan Hinsdale
- Hunt the Man Down (1950) - Burnell 'Brick' Appleby
- My True Story (1951) - Bill Phillips
- Apache Drums (1951) - Mayor Joe Madden
- Caribbean (1952) - Shively, MacAllister's Overseer
- Sangaree (1953) - Gabriel Thatch
- The Vanquished (1953) - Captain Kirby
- The Great Jesse James Raid (1953) - Jesse James
- Kiss Me Kate (1953) - Tex Callaway
- Naked Gun (1956) - Breen Mathews
- Lure of the Swamp (1957) - James Lister
- Lone Texan (1959) - Clint Banister
- Young Jesse James (1960) - Cole Younger
- Walk Tall (1960) - Captain Ed Trask
- The High Powered Rifle (1960) - Stephen Dancer
- Air Patrol (1962) - Lt. Vern Taylor
- The Earth Dies Screaming (1964) - Jeff Nolan
- Waco (1966) - Pete Jenner (final film role)
