= Apache Drums =

1951 film by Hugo Fregonese

- Theatrical release poster
- Directed by: Hugo Fregonese
- Screenplay by: David Chandler
- Story by: Harry Brown
- Based on: His original story "Stand at Spanish Boot"
- Produced by: Val Lewton
- Starring: Stephen McNally; Coleen Gray
- Cinematography: Charles P. Boyle
- Edited by: Milton Carruth
- Music by: Hans J. Salter
- Color process: Technicolor
- Production company: Universal Pictures
- Distributed by: Universal Pictures
- Release dates: May 6, 1950 (New York); June 20, 1950 (Los Angeles)
- Running time: 75 minutes
- Country: United States
- Language: English
- Budget: $395,000
- Box office: $1.4 million (US rentals)

Apache Drums is a 1951 American Western film directed by Hugo Fregonese, produced by Val Lewton and starring Stephen McNally, Coleen Gray and Willard Parker. The film is based on the story Stand at Spanish Boot, written by Harry Brown.

== Plot ==
A notorious gambler is evicted from the town of Spanish Boot, New Mexico, but he quickly returns when he discovers that the town is threatened by the Mescalero Apaches, led by Chief Victorio.

== Cast ==
- Stephen McNally as Sam Leeds
- Coleen Gray as Sally
- Willard Parker as Joe Madden
- Arthur Shields as Reverend Griffin
- James Griffith as Lt. Glidden
- Armando Silvestre as Pedro-Peter
- Georgia Backus as Mrs. Keon
- Clarence Muse as Jehu
- Ruthelma Stevens as Betty Careless
- James Best as Bert Keon
- Chinto Guzman as Chacho
- Ray Bennett as Mr. Keon

== Production ==
The film is based on the Harry Brown story Siege at Spanish Boot, which was purchased by Universal Pictures in May 1950. The film's working title was War Dance.

The film was shot in Apple Valley, California and in the Mojave Desert.

Universal wanted producer Val Lewton to produce additional films, but he accepted an offer to work for Stanley Kramer just before Lewton's death from a heart attack in 1951.

== Reception ==
In a contemporary review for The New York Times, critic A. H. Weiler wrote: "It's true, of course, that the boys in blue take an awful long time in coming to the aid of the beleaguered party, but the late Val Lewton, who produced, and Hugo Fregonese, who directed, have trained their Technicolor cameras so as to capture majestic stretches of multi-colored, towering buttes and shimmering desert wastes. ... 'Apache Drums' is tense and exciting fare when its green and red-painted Indians, yelping and keening, ride to attack or literally bite the dust with authentic thuds. When it is loquaciously appraising its principals, it is, to quote one of them, 'kind of dull and tame.'"

Critic John L. Scott of the Los Angeles Times wrote: "There's nothing new or halfway startling about this shoot-'em-up tale of life in a settlement called Spanish Boot, N.M., except, perhaps, the premise that Spanish Boot is made up of law-abiding, God-fearing villagers who will not tolerate gamblers or female camp followers. ... Western devotees will get their fill of action in this one as bodies of white and redskin pile up."

The film was successful at the box office.
