= Naked Gun (1956 film) =

1956 movie

- Willie Parker breaks up a fight between blonde Veda Ann Borg and brunette Mara Corday in lobby card from Naked Gun
- Directed by: Eddie Dew
- Written by: Guy Tedesco (additional dialogue)
- Screenplay by: Ron Ormond; Jack Lewis
- Produced by: Ron Ormond
- Starring: Willard Parker; Mara Corday; Barton MacLane
- Cinematography: John M. Nickolaus Jr.
- Edited by: Gilbert Warrenton
- Music by: Walter Greene
- Color process: Black and white
- Production company: Ron Ormond Enterprises
- Distributed by: Associated Film Releasing
- Release date: November 1, 1956
- Running time: 69 minutes
- Country: United States
- Language: English

Naked Gun is a 1956 American Western film directed by Eddie Dew and starring Willard Parker, Mara Corday and Barton MacLane.

== Plot ==
American insurance agent Breen Mathews is hired to transport a family treasure from Mexico to the United States. The treasure was stolen from Indians to finance the overthrow of the Mexican government. Unbeknownst to Mathews is the curse that has been placed on the treasure. Traveling by stagecoach to San Francisco, Mathews stops at a small town in Texas. As the treasure is too big for a safe, he arranges to have it locked up in the town jail for safekeeping, but the following day discovers that it has been stolen. While in the town, Mathews falls in love with Louisa, one of the saloon girls. He soon suspects the local judge is involved in the theft. Eventually, Mathews finds the chest and kills the judge and several of his accomplices in a fight. He then resumes his journey, along with Louisa, to return the treasure to its rightful owners, the Indians, and lift the curse.

== Cast ==
- Willard Parker as Breen Mathews
- Mara Corday as Louisa Jackson
- Barton MacLane as Joe Barnum
- Tom Brown as Sonny Glenn
- Veda Ann Borg as Susan Stark
- Chick Chandler as "Shakey" Wilson
- Jody McCrea as Young man
- Billy House as Judge Cole
- Morris Ankrum as Sheriff Jim Jackson
- Rick Vallin as Savage

== Production ==
According to Mara Corday, the movie's name changed several times while being filmed. Originally titled as the Sarazin Curse, it was retitled to The Hanging Judge and then finally to Naked Gun. Decades later, in an interview with Tom Weaver, Corday called the movie "horrible", saying "I knew it was going to be atrocious when the producer said to me 'Do you want to be the ingenue or the heavy?' Right then, I knew I was in trouble."

Primarily a television director, Eddie Dew was hired with the intent of filming the entire movie in five days. Dew was unable to work effectively with the prominent actors starring the film, and his work was subsequently criticized by those involved in the production, with several of the scenes needing to be re-shot after the movie's completion.
