= The Purple Hills =

1961 film by Maury Dexter

- Theatrical release poster
- Directed by: Maury Dexter
- Written by: Russ Bender; Edith Cash Pearl
- Produced by: Maury Dexter
- Starring: Gene Nelson; Kent Taylor; Danny Zapien; Medford Salway; Russ Bender; Joanna Barnes
- Cinematography: Floyd Crosby
- Edited by: Jodie Copelan
- Music by: Richard LaSalle
- Production company: Associated Producers Inc
- Distributed by: 20th Century Fox
- Release date: November 1961
- Running time: 60 minutes
- Country: United States
- Language: English

The Purple Hills (originally titled "The Vanishing Frontier") is a 1961 American Western film directed by Maury Dexter and written by Russ Bender and Edith Cash Pearl. The film stars Gene Nelson, Kent Taylor, Danny Zapien, Medford Salway, Russ Bender and Joanna Barnes. The film was released in November 1961, by 20th Century Fox.

== Plot ==
After killing wanted outlaw A.J. Beaumont, a claim for a $8,225 reward is put in by Gil Shepard, then also by Johnny Barnes, the dead man's partner. While the sheriff tries to decide whose claim is valid, teenaged Martin Beaumont turns up, looking to avenge his brother's death. They also meet Amy Carter, who is attracted to Shepard.

After a discovery that Beaumont had been doing business with Apaches, it's clear even to Martin that his brother was a lawbreaker. Barnes shoots the sheriff, but Shepard gets the better of him and ends up with Carter.

== Cast ==
- Gene Nelson as Gil Shepard
- Kent Taylor as Johnny Barnes
- Danny Zapien as Chito
- Medford Salway as Young Brave
- Russ Bender as Deputy Marshal
- Joanna Barnes as Amy Carter
- Jerry Summers as Martin Beaumont
- Jack Carr as A.J. Beaumont

== Production ==
The movie was one of the first three in a new eight-picture deal between API and 20th Century Fox, the others being Desire in the Dust and Freckles.

The Purple Hills was a remake of a 1915 film.

It was shot in Apacheland, Arizona. Dexter called it "a very simple little trek Western."
