= Harbor Lights (1963 film) =

1963 film by Maury Dexter

- Directed by: Maury Dexter
- Written by: Harry Spalding
- Produced by: Maury Dexter
- Production companies: Associated Producers (API); La Cooperative De Artes Cinematograficos, Producciones Del Viejo San Juan
- Distributed by: Twentieth Century-Fox
- Release date: July 1963
- Running time: 63 minutes
- Country: USA
- Language: English

Harbor Lights is a 1963 American film directed by Maury Dexter.

It was shot in San Juan, Puerto Rico.

== Plot ==
The film follows Dan Crown, a professional gambler, where he travels to San Juan, Puerto Rico to solve the mystery of his brother Alex's death.

== Cast ==
- Kent Taylor as Dan Crown, a professional gambler
- Míriam Colón as Gina Rosario
- Jeff Morrow as Cardinal

== Production ==
It was the first of a two-picture deal between Míriam Colón and Robert L. Lippert.

== Reception ==
The film was received positive reviews from critics. Howard Thompson from The New York Times applauded Kent Taylor for his acting within the film.
