= The Wreck of the Hesperus (1948 film) =

1948 film by John Hoffman

- Directed by: John Hoffman
- Written by: Aubrey Wisberg; Edward Huebsch
- Based on: the poem The Wreck of the Hesperus, by Henry Wadsworth Longfellow
- Produced by: Wallace MacDonald
- Starring: Willard Parker; Edgar Buchanan; Patricia Barry
- Cinematography: Allen G. Siegler
- Edited by: James Sweeney
- Music by: Michael Bakaleinikoff
- Production company: Columbia Pictures
- Distributed by: Columbia Pictures
- Release date: February 5, 1948
- Running time: 70 minutes
- Country: United States
- Language: English

The Wreck of the Hesperus is a 1948 American adventure film directed by John Hoffman and starring Willard Parker, Edgar Buchanan and Patricia Barry. It was produced by silent film actor Wallace MacDonald in association with Columbia Pictures, which also distributed the film. It is preserved in the Library of Congress collection.

== Plot ==
Captain John McReady loses his ship in a storm when he is misled by a fake channel light. With no shipowner willing to give him another command, he accepts a job offered by George Lockhart, managing a salvaging warehouse. It turns out, however, that Lockhart is the man responsible for wrecking McReady's ship and others.

== Cast ==
- Willard Parker as John McReady
- Edgar Buchanan as George Lockhart
- Patricia Barry as Deborah Allen
- Holmes Herbert as Pastor West
- Wilton Graff as Caleb Cross
- Boyd Davis as Governor Lincoln
- Jeff Corey as Joshua Hill
- Paul Campbell as Ned Jones
- Paul E. Burns as Rudolph Zeiss
