= Air Patrol (film) =

1962 film

- Theatrical release poster
- Directed by: Maury Dexter
- Screenplay by: Harry Spalding
- Produced by: Maury Dexter
- Starring: Willard Parker; Merry Anders; Robert Dix; John Holland; Russ Bender; Douglass Dumbrille
- Cinematography: John M. Nickolaus, Jr.
- Music by: Albert Glasser
- Production company: Associated Producers Inc
- Distributed by: 20th Century Fox
- Release date: July 17, 1962
- Running time: 62 minutes
- Country: United States
- Language: English

Air Patrol is a 1962 American CinemaScope drama film directed by Maury Dexter and written by Harry Spalding. The film stars Willard Parker, Merry Anders, Robert Dix, John Holland, Russ Bender and Douglass Dumbrille.

The film was released on July 17, 1962, by 20th Century Fox.

== Plot ==
A Los Angeles detective, Lt Tyler, and his two partners investigate the robbery of a valuable Fragonard painting. Mona Whitney, the secretary of the owner of the painting, is injured by the thief during the robbery. The thief escapes by going to the roof of the building where he stole the painting and his associate picks him up in a helicopter. The thief demands a ransom or the painting will be destroyed. One of the policemen, Sgt Castle, is new to the department and is a former military helicopter pilot. His skill is instrumental in helping to catch the thief. Sgt Castle falls in love with Mona Whitney.

== Cast ==
- Willard Parker as Lt. Vern Tyler
- Merry Anders as Mona Whitney
- Robert Dix as Sgt. Bob Castle
- John Holland as Arthur Murcott
- Russ Bender as Sgt. Lou Kurnitz
- Douglass Dumbrille as Millard Nolan
- George Eldredge as Howie Franklin
- Ivan Bonar as Oliver Dunning
- Jack Younger as Paper Boy
- Glen Marshall as Security Guard
- Ray Dannis as Security Guard
- Stacey Winters as Mrs. Hortense Jackter
- LaRue Farlow as Nolan's Associate

== See also ==
- List of American films of 1962
