= Desire in the Dust =

1960 film by William F. Claxton

- Directed by: William F. Claxton
- Written by: Charles Lang
- Based on: novel by Harry Whittington
- Produced by: William F. Claxton executive Robert L. Lippert
- Starring: Raymond Burr; Martha Hyer; Joan Bennett
- Cinematography: Lucien Ballard
- Edited by: Richard W. Farrell
- Music by: Paul Dunlap
- Production company: Associated Producers, Inc.
- Distributed by: 20th Century Fox
- Release date: October 11, 1960 (New York City)
- Running time: 102 minutes
- Country: United States

Desire in the Dust is a 1960 American neo noir crime film released by the Twentieth Century-Fox Film Corporation, directed by William F. Claxton, produced by Robert L. Lippert and starring Raymond Burr, Martha Hyer and Joan Bennett. The screenplay was written by Charles Lang based on a novel by Harry Whittington.

== Plot ==
Lonnie Wilson, the son of sharecropper Zuba Wilson, returns to his small southern hometown of Clinton, Louisiana after spending six years on a chain gang for killing Colonel Ben Marquand's son Davey in an automobile accident. He revives his love affair with Melinda Marquand, who married Dr. Ned Thomas while Lonnie was serving time for the accident that she had actually caused.

Lonnie incites Ned about his wife's infidelity, which Ned verifies when he catches Lonnie and Melinda in an embrace in Colonel Marquand's hunting lodge. Melinda, looking for an explanation, shoots and wounds Lonnie to defend her innocence by claiming that she was being raped.

Colonel Marquand, who had paid Lonnie to take the blame for his daughter, uses her story to have Sheriff Wheaton kill Lonnie. Mrs. Marquand eventually faces Davey's death and realizes that she witnessed Melinda run down her little brother.

Peter Marquand and Ned return to the lodge and inform Otis that the charges against Lonnie are based on lies. Exonerated, Lonnie gives Zuba the deed to the farm, and Zuba dances in delight, thrilled to finally own his land.

== Cast ==
- Raymond Burr as Col. Ben Marquand
- Martha Hyer as Melinda Marquand
- Joan Bennett as Mrs. Marquand
- Ken Scott as Lonnie Wilson
- Brett Halsey as Dr. Ned Thomas
- Ed Binns as Luke Connett
- Margaret Field as Maude Wilson (later Maggie Mahoney, mother of Sally Field)
- Douglas Fowley as Zuba Wilson
- Kelly Thordsen as Sheriff Wheaton
- Rex Ingram as Burt Crane
- Jack Ging as Peter Marquand
- Anne Helm as Cass Wilson
- Irene Ryan as Nora Finney
- Paul Baxley as Thurman Case
- Robert Earle as Virgil

== Production ==
In September 1959, Robert L. Lippert bought the screen rights to Harry Wittington's novel Desire in the Dust. He wanted Patricia Owens and Tuesday Weld for the leads. Along with Freckles (1960) and The Purple Hills (1961), the film was part of a new eight-picture deal between API and Twentieth Century-Fox Film Corporation. Other films produced as part of the agreement included Squad Car, Secret of the Purple Reef and Frontier Judge. Lippert wanted to film the novel to attract a more adult audience and "attract important people in the business to what we're trying to do."

Dana Andrews was originally cast in the lead but backed out. He was replaced by Raymond Burr, then three years into Perry Mason, which was on a production break because of a writers' strike.

Filming began in July 1960 in Baton Rouge, Louisiana.

== Reception ==
In a contemporary review for The New York Times, critic Howard Thompson called Desire in the Dust "an interesting little picture" while noting the film's striking similarities with The Long, Hot Summer (1958), although with one important difference: "[W]hereas 'Summer' collapsed in honeysuckle absurdity, 'Desire' explodes theatrically in about three directions, bloodhounds included." Thompson praised the performances, especially that of Martha Hyer as "an ice-cold vixen, indeed," but ended his review by summarizing the film as a "... curious picture, which shifts from the beguiling to the ridiculous."

== See also ==
- List of American films of 1960
