= The Young Animals =

1968 film directed by Maury Dexter

- Directed by: Maury Dexter
- Screenplay by: James Gordon White
- Produced by: Maury Dexter
- Starring: Tom Nardini; Patty McCormack; Joanna Frank; David Macklin; Arthur Petersen; Russ Bender
- Cinematography: Kenneth Peach
- Edited by: Sidney Levin
- Music by: Les Baxter
- Production company: American International Pictures
- Release date: October 1968
- Running time: 100 minutes
- Country: United States
- Language: English

The Young Animals, also known as Born Wild, is a 1968 drama film directed by Maury Dexter. It was the second in a four-picture deal he did with AIP and was filmed at Tucson, Arizona.

== Plot ==
WASP Bruce (David Macklin) and his gang beat up Mexican American Paco (Zooey Hall) and rape his girlfriend, Raquel (Joanna Frank). Super cool Latino Tony (Tom Nardini) comes to town and hits it off with the blonde Janet (Patty McCormack), who Bruce thinks is his girl. Bruce and his pals chase Tony down, but let him go with a warning to stay away from Janet. Tony decides to organize the Mexican-American students at school, and when principal Wilson (Arthur Petersen) refuses to even listen to their complaints, organizes a walk out by the Mexican-American students. The students picket the school and even brawl with Bruce's gang. After Raquel tells Janet that she was raped, some of the white students walk out in solidarity. Then Paco and a group of students who favor a more radical approach, attack Din-din (Keith Taylor), a member of Bruce's group and his girlfriend. Bruce and his followers get their revenge, killing Paco and Raquel in a staged road "accident". Bruce and his pals try to kill Tony and Janet, but in the end Bruce is arrested. Principal Wilson finally agrees to talk with the students and the walk out ends.

== Cast ==
- Tom Nardini as Tony
- Patty McCormack as Janet
- Joanna Frank as Raquel
- David Macklin as Bruce
- Zooey Hall as Paco
- Arthur Petersen as Principal Wilson
- Keith Taylor as "Din-Din"

According to IMDB, Cher appeared in this film as an uncredited extra.
