= Frontier Gambler =

1956 film by Sam Newfield

- Theatrical release poster
- Directed by: Sam Newfield
- Screenplay by: Orville H. Hampton
- Produced by: Sigmund Neufeld
- Starring: John Bromfield; Coleen Gray; Kent Taylor; Jim Davis; Margia Dean; Veda Ann Borg
- Cinematography: Edward Linden
- Edited by: Dwight Caldwell
- Music by: Paul Dunlap
- Production company: Sigmund Neufeld Productions
- Distributed by: Associated Film Releasing Corporation
- Release date: July 1, 1956
- Running time: 71 minutes
- Country: United States
- Language: English

Frontier Gambler is a 1956 American Western film directed by Sam Newfield and written by Orville H. Hampton. The film stars John Bromfield, Coleen Gray, Kent Taylor, Jim Davis, Margia Dean and Veda Ann Borg. The film was released on July 1, 1956, by Associated Film Releasing Corporation.

== Cast ==
- John Bromfield as Deputy Curt Darrow
- Coleen Gray as Sylvia 'The Princess' Melbourne
- Kent Taylor as Roger 'The Duke' Chadwick
- Jim Davis as Tony Burton
- Margia Dean as Gloria Starling
- Veda Ann Borg as Francie Merritt
- Stanley Andrews as Philo Dewey
- Nadine Ashdown as Sylvia
- Tracey Roberts as Helen McBride
- Roy Engel as Tom McBride
- John Merton as Shorty
- Frank Sully as Bartender
