= The Devil's Saddle Legion =

1937 film by Bobby Connolly

- Theatrical release poster
- Directed by: Bobby Connolly
- Screenplay by: Ed Earl Repp
- Produced by: Bryan Foy
- Starring: Dick Foran; Anne Nagel; Willard Parker; Gordon Hart; Ernie Stanton; Max Hoffman Jr. Jeff York
- Cinematography: Ted D. McCord
- Edited by: Frank Magee
- Music by: Howard Jackson
- Production company: Warner Bros. Pictures
- Distributed by: Warner Bros. Pictures
- Release date: August 14, 1937
- Running time: 52 minutes
- Country: United States
- Language: English

The Devil's Saddle Legion is a 1937 American Western film directed by Bobby Connolly and written by Ed Earl Repp. The film stars Dick Foran, Anne Nagel, Willard Parker, Gordon Hart, Ernie Stanton, Max Hoffman Jr. and Jeff York. The film was released by Warner Bros. Pictures on August 14, 1937.

== Plot ==
A rancher finds out that a dam is planned which will cover some of his lands and divert a river, taking some territory from Texas. He successfully fights the plan.

== Cast ==
- Dick Foran as Tal Holladay
- Anne Nagel as Karan Ordley
- Willard Parker as Hub Ordley
- Gordon Hart as John Ordley
- Ernie Stanton as Reggie
- Max Hoffman Jr. as Butch
- Jeff York as Chris Madden
- Glenn Strange as Pewee
- Carlyle Moore Jr. as Chip Carter
- John 'Skins' Miller as Spooks Wilkins
- Frank Orth as Judge Barko
- Jack Mower as Slats Dawson
- Milton Kibbee as Spane
- George Chesebro as Red Frayne
- Charles Le Moyne as Caliope
- Ray Bennett as Sheriff Duke Gorman
