= Arthur Peterson (actor) =

American actor (1912–1996)

Arthur Peterson Jr.
- Born: November 18, 1912; Mandan, North Dakota, U.S.
- Died: October 31, 1996 (aged 83); Los Angeles, California, U.S.
- Education: University of Minnesota
- Occupation: Actor
- Years active: 1948–1983
- Notable work: Soap

Arthur Peterson Jr. (November 18, 1912 – October 31, 1996) was an American actor. He played character and supporting roles on stage, television, and feature films. On television, he played the Major in the TV series Soap (1977–1981).

== Early life ==
Arthur Peterson was born and raised in Mandan, North Dakota, the son of the bank cashier Arthur Henry Peterson Sr. (1879–1964) and Ruth Marian Peterson (née Myers, 1883–1961). Peterson first obtained a degree in theater from the University of Minnesota before becoming a professional actor with the first Federal Theatre Project. Peterson made his media debut in 1937 with the central role on the radio serial The Guiding Light. During World War II, Peterson fought within General Patton's Third Army.

== Acting career ==
In the era of old-time radio, Peterson portrayed Wilton Comstock on Bachelor's Children, Bill Baxter on The Baxters, Judge Parsons on The Tom Mix Ralston Straightshooters, and John Ruthledge on Guiding Light. In June 1948 he was in the initial episode of Richard Durham's Destination Freedom radio anthology.

In 1949, Peterson appeared in the ABC network's first sitcom, That's O'Toole. In 1960, he appeared in the episode “The Peace Officer” (S6E6) in the TV Western Gunsmoke, as well as in 1961 as Sam Frazer in “A Man A Day” and in 1966 as a drunk in “Champion of the World”.

Peterson's stage work included appearances in such plays as Inherit the Wind. His film career has been sporadic, including such titles as The Young Animals (AKA Born Wild) (1968) and Rollercoaster (1977). Peterson was guest artist at George Mason University, where he taught classes in acting and developed original materials such as The Monster, The Bride and Stephen based on the writings of Stephen Crane. He also co-authored with June August, a one-man show titled Robert Frost: Fire and Ice, based on the life and works of the famous poet.

After the premiere of the one-man show at the Pasadena Playhouse Interim Theatre, Peterson spent 1981 to 1991 touring the United States with the Robert Frost piece, which alternated with a Pasadena Playhouse production of The Gin Game, performed with his wife Norma, (a play previously performed on Broadway by Jessica Tandy and her husband Hume Cronyn). During Arthur's residency at George Mason, he met David Arrow, who was instrumental in bringing Robert Frost: Fire and Ice off-Broadway, where it played during the summer of 1984. Peterson also recorded the piece for AudioBooks. When the long run ended for these plays, Peterson retired from acting in 1991.

== Personal life and death ==
Peterson was married to Norma Ransom, an actress whom he met when the two were students at the University of Minnesota. He died on October 31, 1996, of Alzheimer's disease in the Amberwood Convalescent Hospital in Los Angeles. He was a member of Calvary Presbyterian Church in South Pasadena, California, and his funeral was held there as well.

== Filmography ==
Year	Title	Role	Notes
1948	Call Northside 777	Keeler's Polygraph Assistant	Uncredited
1961	Return to Peyton Place	Selectman Seth	Uncredited
1964	One Man's Way	Instructor	
1964	Invitation to a Gunfighter	Schoop	Uncredited
1968	Yours, Mine and Ours	Priest	
1968	Targets	Ed Loughlin	
1968	The Young Animals	Principal Wilson	
1972	The Great Northfield Minnesota Raid	Jefferson Jones	
1975	At Long Last Love	George (Nightclub)	
1977	Rollercoaster	Owner #4	
