= One Way to Love =

1946 film by Ray Enright

- Directed by: Ray Enright
- Written by: Lester Lee; Larry Marks; Joseph Hoffman; Jack Henley
- Produced by: Burt Kelly
- Starring: Willard Parker; Marguerite Chapman; Chester Morris; Janis Carter
- Cinematography: Charles Lawton Jr.
- Edited by: Richard Fantl
- Music by: Marlin Skiles
- Production company: Columbia Pictures
- Distributed by: Columbia Pictures
- Release date: January 9, 1946
- Running time: 83 minutes
- Country: United States
- Language: English

One Way to Love is a 1946 American comedy film directed by Ray Enright and starring Willard Parker, Marguerite Chapman, Chester Morris and Janis Carter. It was produced and distributed by Columbia Pictures. The plot has some similarities to Columbia's 1934 screwball comedy Twentieth Century.

== Plot ==
Hit radio scriptwriter Barry Cole is offered a lucrative new job, but can't work without his old writing partner Mitchell who has quit under pressure from his fiancée Marcia. Enlisting the help of his own girlfriend Josie, Barry sets out to break the engagement up and recruit Mitchell to work with him. On a train heading for Los Angeles Barry tries to manipulate the various other characters while also securing a sponsor for his new show.

== Cast ==
- Willard Parker as Mitchell Raymond
- Marguerite Chapman as Marcia Winthrop
- Chester Morris as Barry Cole
- Janis Carter as Josie Hart
- Hugh Herbert as Eustace P. Trumble
- Dusty Anderson as WAAC Captain Henderson
- Jerome Cowan as A.J. Gunther
- Irving Bacon as Train Conductor
- Roscoe Karns as Hobie Simmons
- Frank Sully as Hopkins
- Frank Jenks as Jensen
- Lewis L. Russell as Roger Winthrop
- Nick Stewart as Julius
- Joseph Crehan as Chief Dispatcher
- Sam McDaniel as Porter
- Dudley Dickerson as Porter
- Pat O'Malley as Pullman Conductor
