= Joyce Meadows =

Canadian-American film and television actress

- Meadows in 1964
- Born: Joyce Johanna Burger; April 13, 1933 (age 93); Arrowwood, Alberta, Canada
- Occupations: Film and television actress
- Years active: 1956–1995
- Spouse: Merrill Harrington (m. 1984)
- Website: joycemeadows.net

Joyce Meadows (born Joyce Johanna Burger; born April 13, 1933) is a Canadian-American film and television actress.

== Life and career ==
Meadows was born in Arrowwood, Alberta. She emigrated to the United States, and moved with her family to Montana and then California. She worked as a singer while in high school, and was a winner of the Miss Sacramento pageant, after which she moved to Hollywood, California. She studied acting there under Jeff Corey, earning her scholarship to the Pasadena Playhouse. She moved to Los Angeles, California, where she began her screen career in the 1956 film Flesh and the Spur.

Later in her career, in 1960, Meadows starred as Stacy in the syndicated western television series Two Faces West, starring along with Charles Bateman and Francis DeSales. After the series ended in 1961, she guest-starred in numerous television programs including Bachelor Father, 77 Sunset Strip, Harbor Command, Perry Mason, Alfred Hitchcock Presents, Wagon Train, Tales of Wells Fargo, The Restless Gun, Highway Patrol, Wanted: Dead or Alive, The Millionaire, Kraft Suspense Theatre, The Man and the Challenge, and Maverick. She also starred as television series Two Faces West. She also appeared in films such as The Brain from Planet Arous, Frontier Gun, The Girl in Lovers Lane, Walk Tall, and Zebra in the Kitchen.

Meadows retired from acting in 1995, but later appeared in the 2009 short film A Golightly Gathering.
