= Walk Tall (film) =

1960 film by Maury Dexter

- Theatrical release poster
- Directed by: Maury Dexter
- Screenplay by: Joseph Fritz
- Story by: Joseph Fritz
- Produced by: Maury Dexter
- Starring: Willard Parker; Joyce Meadows; Kent Taylor; Russ Bender; Ron Soble; William Mims
- Cinematography: Floyd Crosby
- Edited by: Edward Dutko
- Music by: Richard D. Aurandt
- Production company: Associated Producers Incorporated
- Distributed by: 20th Century Fox
- Release date: September 1, 1960
- Running time: 61 minutes
- Country: United States
- Language: English
- Budget: $250,000

Walk Tall is a 1960 American Western film directed by Maury Dexter and written by Joseph Fritz, presented in CinemaScope and DeLuxe Color. The film stars Willard Parker, Joyce Meadows, Kent Taylor, Russ Bender, Ron Soble and William Mims. The film was released on September 1, 1960, by 20th Century Fox.

== Plot ==
Lawman Ed Trask (Willard Parker) tries to bring in outlaw Ed Carter (Kent Taylor). Carter nearly provokes a war when he and his gang brutally raid a Shoshone community.

== Cast ==
- Willard Parker as Captain Ed Trask
- Joyce Meadows as Sally Medford
- Kent Taylor as Frank Carter
- Russ Bender as Col. Stanton
- Ron Soble as Leach
- William Mims as Jake
- Alberto Monte as Carlos
- Felix Locher as Chief Black Feather
- Dave DePaul as Buffalo Horn

== Production ==
The film was shot in San Bernardino National Forest in June, 1960.
