= Bodyhold =

1949 film by Seymour Friedman

- Directed by: Seymour Friedman
- Screenplay by: George Bricker
- Produced by: Rudolph C. Flotlow
- Starring: Willard Parker; Lola Albright; Hillary Brooke
- Cinematography: Henry Freulich; Philip Tannura
- Edited by: James Sweeney
- Production company: Columbia Pictures
- Distributed by: Columbia Pictures
- Release date: December 8, 1949
- Running time: 63 minutes
- Country: United States
- Language: English

Bodyhold is a 1949 American crime film noir sport film directed by Seymour Friedman and starring Willard Parker, Lola Albright, and Hillary Brooke.

== Plot ==
Tommy Jones, a well-built plumber, is invited to join a troupe of wrestlers, but is surprised to learn that the sport of exhibition wrestling is not on the up-on-up.

== Cast ==
- Willard Parker as Tommy Jones
- Lola Albright as Mary Simmons
- Hillary Brooke as Flo Woodbury
- Allen Jenkins as Slats Henry
- Roy Roberts as Charlie Webster
- Gordon Jones as Pat Simmons
- John Dehner as Sir Raphael Brokenridge

== Reception ==
The New York Times called it a "dim saga".
