= The High Powered Rifle =

1960 film by Maury Dexter

- Theatrical release poster
- Directed by: Maury Dexter
- Screenplay by: Joseph Fritz
- Story by: Harry Spaulding as Thomas Geary
- Produced by: Maury Dexter
- Starring: Willard Parker; Allison Hayes; Dan Simmons; John Holland; Shirley O'Hara; Terrea Lea
- Cinematography: Floyd Crosby
- Edited by: Eddie Dutko
- Music by: Albert Glasser
- Production company: Capri Productions
- Distributed by: 20th Century-Fox
- Release date: September 1960
- Running time: 62 minutes
- Country: United States
- Language: English
- Budget: $50,000

The High Powered Rifle (also known as Duel in the City) is a 1960 American action film produced and directed by Maury Dexter and written by Joseph Fritz. The film stars Willard Parker, Allison Hayes, Dan Simmons, John Holland, Shirley O'Hara and Terrea Lea. The film was released in September 1960, by 20th Century-Fox.

== Plot ==
A private eye is attacked by an assassin.

== Cast ==
- Willard Parker as Stephen Dancer
- Allison Hayes as Sharon Hill
- Dan Simmons as Lt. Sam 'Mac' Donald
- John Holland as District Attorney
- Shirley O'Hara as Jean Brewster
- Terrea Lea as Terrea Lea
- Leonard P. Geer as Gus Alpert
- Clark Howat as George Merkle
- A.G. Vitanza as Little Charlie Roos

== Production ==
In the mid-1950s 20th Century-Fox created a separate film company to make second features in CinemaScope initially called Regal Pictures, then Associated Producers Incorporated or API. Each of their features was shot in seven days in black and white with a budget of $100,000. Unlike other B Picture producers, Regal and API maintained motion picture union standards of salaries and schedules. With Fox's decreasing main feature production schedule, there was a fear that API would have to be disbanded as there were not enough main features to support (which eventually happened in the mid-1960s).

As an experiment, Robert Lippert told API producer Maury Dexter he wished to make films at half the budget and release them as double features in the manner of American International Pictures and Roger Corman's Filmgroup.

Dexter was skeptical, but made his directorial debut when he leapt to the challenge. He completed the film at $50,000 on actual locations, including the house of Gary Cooper's mother.

Dexter said the film's title came from Lippert and Harry Spaulding had to write a script to suit it. It was Dexter's directorial debut.

== Reception ==
Variety wrote: "That seemingly inexhaustible source of modern melodramatics, the private-eye, is the center of attention once again in this swift, efficient, but uninspired program item out of 20th by Capri Productions. In many ways, it's no more and no less than an extension of the sort of super-sleuthing that can be found all over the network airwaves, but there are several areas in which it-is a cut above the average for a film of its genre. As lower-half fare, The High-Powered Rifle is just aboul on target."

The Hollywood Reporter wrote: "The High-Powered Rifle is a lowcalibre crime suspense entry that will do for double-billing. Maury Dexter, who produced and directed the 20th-Fox release, has achieved some feel of realism in filming his story, but the story isn't much to work on in the first place. The situations and some of the dialogue in Joseph Fritz's screenplay are sometimes reminiscent of the private eye school of Dashiell Hammett and Raymond Chandler, but without the clarity of story line that distinguished those writers. ... The story line in High-Powered Rifle is hard to follow, despite its basic simplicity. Dialogue tends to get rather self-consciously clever, and is often thrown in for its own sake rather than to speed plot or for character development or revelation."
