= Womanhunt =

1962 film by Maury Dexter

- Theatrical release poster
- Directed by: Maury Dexter
- Screenplay by: Russ Bender; Edward J. Lakso
- Story by: Harry Spalding
- Produced by: Maury Dexter
- Starring: Steven Piccaro; Lisa Lu; Berry Kroeger
- Cinematography: Floyd Crosby
- Edited by: Jodie Copelan; Carl Pierson
- Music by: Henry Vars
- Production company: Associated Producers Inc
- Distributed by: 20th Century Fox
- Release date: June 3, 1962
- Running time: 60 minutes
- Country: United States
- Language: English

Womanhunt is a 1962 American drama film directed by Maury Dexter and written by Russ Bender and Edward J. Lakso. The film stars Steven Piccaro, Lisa Lu, Berry Kroeger, Bob Okazaki, Ann Carroll, Tom Daly and Ivan Bonar. The film was released on June 3, 1962, by 20th Century Fox.

== Cast ==
- Steven Piccaro as Hal Weston
- Lisa Lu as Li Sheng
- Berry Kroeger as Petrie / Osgood
- Bob Okazaki as Dr. Sheng
- Ann Carroll as Janet Oberon
- Tom Daly as Mr. Davalos
- Ivan Bonar as Jacobs

== Production ==
Womanhunt was an original story by Jesse Lasky Jr and Pat Silver.

The film was shot in and around Los Angeles.
