= Coleen Gray =

American actress (1922–2015)

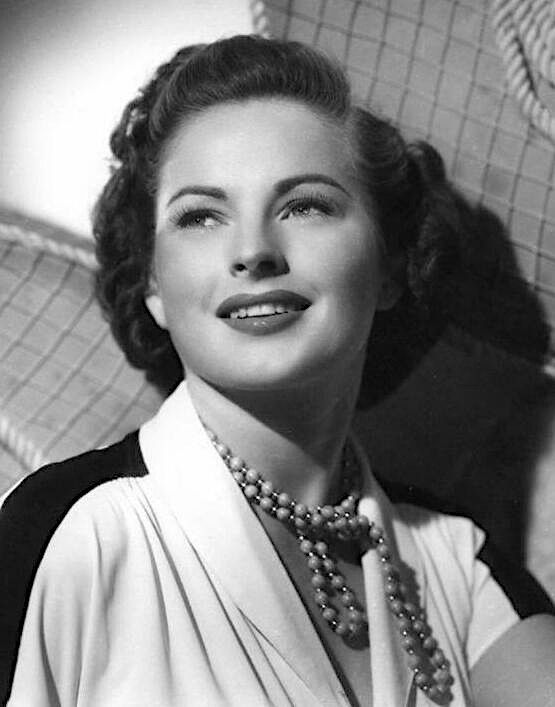
- Born: Doris Jensen; October 23, 1922; Staplehurst, Nebraska, U.S.
- Died: August 3, 2015 (aged 92); Los Angeles, California, U.S.
- Education: Hutchinson High School; Hamline University (BA)
- Occupation: Actress
- Years active: 1944–1986
- Known for: Nightmare Alley; Red River; The Killing; The Phantom Planet
- Political party: Republican
- Spouses: Rod Amateau (m. 1945; div. 1949) William Bidlack (m. 1953; died 1978) Joseph Fritz Zeiser (m. 1979; died 2012)
- Children: 2

Coleen Gray (born Doris Jensen; October 23, 1922 – August 3, 2015) was an American actress, best known for her roles in the films Nightmare Alley (1947), Red River (1948), and Stanley Kubrick's The Killing (1956).

== Early years ==
Born to Danish parents in Staplehurst, Nebraska, Gray grew up on a farm. After graduating from Hutchinson High School as Doris Jensen, she studied art, literature, and music at Hamline University, and graduated summa cum laude with a Bachelor of Arts. She travelled to California, and worked as a waitress in a restaurant in La Jolla. After several weeks there, she moved to Los Angeles and enrolled at UCLA. She also worked in the school's library and at a YWCA while a student.

== Stage ==
She had leading roles in the Los Angeles stage productions Letters to Lucerne and Brief Music, which won her a 20th Century Fox contract in 1944.

== Film appearances ==
When I attended the University, I daydreamed about being a movie star. I would do my dressing room in Early American and give lovely presents to my make-up man and hairdresser for making me look so lovely, and so on. When I got my contract at 20th I was in seventh heaven, but I found out that a movie career is mostly hard work laced with disappointments.

— Coleen Gray, The Boston Sunday Post November 9, 1947

After playing a bit part in State Fair (1945), she became pregnant and briefly stopped working, only to return a year later as the love interest of the character played by John Wayne in Red River (1948), which was shot in 1946 but held for release until 1948. Gray appeared in two 1947 films noir: in Kiss of Death as Victor Mature's ex-con character's wife and Richard Widmark's character's target; and in Nightmare Alley as Tyrone Power's character's carnival performer wife, "Electra." In 1947, Gray used her musical abilities as she sang her part live while filming (rather than having her voice dubbed) opposite Bing Crosby in Riding High, directed by Frank Capra. Riding High was not a success and Fox ended her contract in 1950.

Gray worked steadily in the 1950s, but mostly in smaller movies. She played a crooked nurse in The Sleeping City (1950) and appeared in Kansas City Confidential (1952) and in the Stanley Kubrick film noir The Killing (1956), in which she plays the loyal girlfriend of criminal Sterling Hayden. In the 1953 Western The Vanquished, she played a woman who attacks Jan Sterling's character with a pair of scissors in a crazed attempt to exonerate the man she loves (John Payne). Other films included Father Is a Bachelor (1950), The Leech Woman (1960), The Phantom Planet (1961), and P.J. (1968).

Gray appeared in The Late Liz (1971), and acted in the films Forgotten Lady (1977), and Mother (1978) with Patsy Ruth Miller. Mother had a premiere at the Museum of Modern Art in New York City. Both Mother and Forgotten Lady were written for Gray by Brian Pinette, who also served as director and producer. She appeared in the religious film Cry From the Mountain (1986, in the USA), directed by James F. Collier.

== Television ==
From the 1950s, Gray guest-starred in episodes of television series such as Four Star Playhouse, Maverick, Alfred Hitchcock Presents, Perry Mason, Mr. Ed, Tales of Wells Fargo in 1960 in the episode "The Journey" as Sandra Morton, Rawhide in 1962 in the episode "The Devil and the Deep Blue" as Helen Wade, 77 Sunset Strip, Bonanza, The Deputy, Have Gun Will Travel, The Dakotas, Family Affair, Ironside, Lawman, The Name of the Game, Branded, and Tales from the Darkside. On May 23, 1962, she was cast as Miss Wycliffe in the series finale, "A Job for Summer", of the CBS comedy/drama series, Window on Main Street, starring Robert Young as a widowed author in his hometown. She made four guest appearances on Perry Mason, including the title role of defendant Lorraine Kendall in the 1960 episode, "The Case of the Wandering Widow." Gray was a regular on the daytime dramas Bright Promise and Days of Our Lives.

== Personal life ==
Gray married Rod Amateau, a screenwriter, on August 10, 1945; they divorced on February 11, 1949, and had one daughter, Susan. Gray's second husband was William Clymer Bidlack, an aviation executive. They were married from July 14, 1953, until his death in 1978. The union produced a son, Bruce Robin Bidlack.

In 1979, Gray married widowed Biblical scholar Joseph Fritz Zeiser; they remained together until his death in March 2012. They worked together in Presbyterian causes and the non-profit organization, Prison Fellowship, founded in 1976 by Chuck Colson.

Gray was a Republican and supported Barry Goldwater in the 1964 United States presidential election. That same year, along with actors Victor Jory and Susan Seaforth, she testified before the United States Congress as part of "Project Prayer", arguing in favor of a constitutional amendment allowing school prayer.

Gray, at age 92, died of natural causes in her Bel Air home in Los Angeles on August 3, 2015.

She was cremated at Pierce Brothers Westwood Village Memorial Park Cemetery and her ashes given to her stepson, Rick Zeiser. Her memorial service was held at the Bel Air Presbyterian Church where she, and her third husband, Joseph Fritz Zeiser, had been active members.

== Public service ==
Gray was a member of the board of directors at her alma mater, Hamline University. She was also active within the following organizations: WAIF, the child adoption organization as president, The March of Dimes, American Cancer Society, American Red Cross, American Mental Health Association, Los Angeles Epilepsy Society, Junior Blind, The Bel-Air Republican Women's Group, and the Boy Scouts of America and the Girl Scouts of the United States of America.

== Complete filmography ==
- State Fair (1945) - Girl with Pappy (uncredited)
- Three Little Girls in Blue (1946) - Girl at the Beach (uncredited)
- The Shocking Miss Pilgrim (1947) (scenes cut)
- Kiss of Death (1947) - Nettie
- Nightmare Alley (1947) - Molly
- Fury at Furnace Creek (1948) - Molly Baxter
- Red River (1948) - Fen
- Sand (1949) - Joan Hartley
- Father Is a Bachelor (1950) - Prudence Millett
- Riding High (1950) - Alice Higgins
- The Sleeping City (1950) - Ann Sebastian
- I'll Get You for This (1951) - Kay Wonderly
- Apache Drums (1951) - Sally
- Models Inc. (1952) - Rusty Faraday
- Kansas City Confidential (1952) - Helen Foster
- The Vanquished (1953) - Jane Colfax
- Sabre Jet (1953) - Mrs. Gil Manton, aka Jane Carter
- The Fake (1953) - Mary Mason
- Arrow In the Dust (1954) - Christella Burke
- Las Vegas Shakedown (1955) - Julie Rae
- Tennessee's Partner (1955) - Goldie Slater, w/Ronald Reagan
- The Twinkle in God's Eye (1955) - Laura
- The Wild Dakotas (1956) - Sue "Lucky" Duneen
- Star in the Dust (1956) - Nellie Mason
- The Killing (1956) - Fay
- Frontier Gambler (1956) - Sylvia "The Princess" Melbourne
- Death of a Scoundrel (1956) - Mrs. Edith Van Renasslear
- The Black Whip (1956) - Jeannie
- Destination 60,000 (1957) - Mary Ellen
- The Vampire (1957) - Carol Butler
- Copper Sky (1957) - Nora Hayes
- Hell's Five Hours (1958) - Nancy Brand
- Johnny Rocco (1958) - Lois Mayfield
- The Leech Woman (1960) - June Talbot
- The Phantom Planet (1961) - Liara
- Alfred Hitchcock Presents (1962) (Season 7 Episode 33: "The Opportunity") - Mrs. Lois Callen
- Town Tamer (1965) - Carol Rosser
- The Virginian (1965) - Mrs Marsh
- P.J. (1968) - Betty Orbison
- The Late Liz (1971) - Sue Webb
- Ellery Queen: Don't Look Behind You (1971, TV Movie) - Mrs. Cazalis
- Mother (1978) - Angela Harding
- The Best Place to Be (1979, TV Movie) - Dottie Parker
- Cry From the Mountain (1985) - Marian Rissman

== Radio appearances ==
Year	Program	Episode/source
1952	Theatre Guild on the Air	The Meanest Man in the World
1953	Lux Radio Theatre	Appointment with Danger
