= Maryjane (film) =

1968 film by Maury Dexter

- Directed by: Maury Dexter
- Written by: Dick Gautier; Peter Marshall
- Based on: story by Maury Dexter
- Produced by: Maury Dexter
- Starring: Fabian; Diane McBain
- Cinematography: Richard Moore
- Edited by: Sidney Levin
- Music by: Mike Curb; Lawrence Brown
- Production company: American International Pictures
- Distributed by: American International Pictures
- Release date: January 24, 1968
- Country: United States
- Language: English
- Box office: $1,000,000 (US/ Canada)

Maryjane is a 1968 American feature film directed by Maury Dexter and starring Fabian and Diane McBain. It was written by Dick Gautier and Peter Marshall. A high school art teacher is framed for drug possession.

== Plot ==
A car driven by a driver intoxicated by marijuana plunges off a cliff, killing the driver and injuring a female passenger.

It turns out marijuana use is rife at a small town high school, led by the clique of Jordan Bates. Art teacher Phil Blake tries to persuade student Jerry Blackburn not to smoke. Jerry borrows Phil's car and Jordan leaves some marijuana in it. Phil gets arrested for possession of marijuana.

== Cast ==
- Fabian as Phil Blake
- Diane McBain as Ellie Holden
- Michael Margotta as Jerry Blackburn
- Kevin Coughlin as Jordan Bates
- Patty McCormack as Susan Hoffman

== Production ==
According to Maury Dexter "there was nothing salacious or offensive about" the film "but it did have some provocative scenes that showed the results of overindulging and the risks taken when someone needs 'a fix.'"

The movie was shot almost entirely in the Hollywood area. The Doheny Mansion in Beverly Hills was used for some scenes. "The stark beauty of the estate set against the ramblings of a young 'user' was, I thought, quite effective," wrote Dexter later.

Some scenes, including the shoplifting event, were shot in the Conejo Valley and the Decker Canyon Road area between Thousand Oaks and Malibu.

Fabian later described the film as being about "a Good Humor Man who sold marijuana to high school kids."

== Reception ==
Dexter said "the film did very well at the box office, although, it was far from a big hit."

Variety wrote: "The most depressing thing about this slickly filmed Maury Dexter production is that nothing is answered after the film has run its course. Is it really taking a stand? ... All the adults in the film are stereotypes with less than a modicum of intelligence among them. The students, many of whom seem quite old to be at the high school level, are at least more energetic."

Boxoffice wrote: "Since one of the young teachers turns out to be a 'pusher' in the film, it is not all juvenile delinquency. The police chief and the town mayor are not given a very good image and there are sadistic angles to the juveniles' conduct that have the shock impact intended. Nor are the teachers or the coach the best examples for the young. A popcorn-crowd thriller that asks topical questions. The film would be less shocking if poorly acted or if made in black and white instead of Pathe Color."

Diabolique magazine later wrote: "It’s bewildering to think that AIP made this the year after The Trip (1967)… but then Sam Arkoff and Jim Nicholson [sic] were concerned about the former movie being too pro-drug so maybe they churned this out to cover their bases. Maury Dexter’s handling is generally quite lively and there is some decent enough acting, but this is just silly, with gangs of kids puffing weed and driving off cliffs, like in Reefer Madness (1936). It’s a little odd seeing Fabian play a teacher... it’s a shame this wasn’t made a few years earlier when he could have played the charismatic bad student."
