= Maury Dexter =

American film director (1927–2017)

- Born: Morris Gene Poindexter; June 12, 1927; Paris, Arkansas U.S.
- Died: May 28, 2017 (aged 89); Simi Valley, California, U.S.
- Occupations: TV and film producer, director and actor
- Years active: 1946–1991
- Known for: Directorial work for Little House on the Prairie and Highway to Heaven TV shows

Maury Dexter (born Morris Gene Poindexter; June 12, 1927 – May 28, 2017) was an American producer and director of film and TV. He worked several times for Robert L. Lippert and American International Pictures.

== Life and career ==
Dexter was born in Paris, Arkansas, to William Henry and Emma (née Foster) Poindexter. He has three brothers, Foster, William Jr., and James.

Dexter first entered show business as a teenaged actor in The Three Stooges short, Uncivil War Birds (1946). After a few additional movie roles, he busied himself with stage and television work until the Korean War and military service intervened; following his discharge, he landed an acting job on The Hank McCune Show (1950) and was soon working there behind the scenes. A clerical job at filmmaker Robert L. Lippert's Regal Films eventually led to Dexter producing and directing gigs at that independent production company, where many of the movies were shot in seven days on $100,000 budgets.

A member of the Directors Guild of America since 1956, Dexter once directed 20 films in a year's time for 20th Century Fox. By the 1960s, he had his own production company, but the apex of his career came when he became a director for two highly successful NBC-TV series produced by actor Michael Landon, who co-created, starred in, and produced both Little House on the Prairie (1974–83) and Highway to Heaven (1984–89).

== Death ==
Dexter died in Simi Valley, California, at the age of 89.

== Filmography ==
- Walk Tall (1960)
- The High Powered Rifle (1960)
- The Purple Hills (1961)
- Womanhunt (1962)
- Air Patrol (1962)
- The Firebrand (1962)
- Young Guns of Texas (1962)
- The Day Mars Invaded Earth (1963)
- House of the Damned (1963)
- Police Nurse (1963)
- Harbor Lights (1963)
- The Young Swingers (1963)
- Surf Party (1964)
- Raiders from Beneath the Sea (1964)
- The Naked Brigade (1965)
- Wild on the Beach (1965)
- Django the Condemned (1965)
- Maryjane (1968)
- The Mini-Skirt Mob (1968)
- The Young Animals (1968)
- Hell's Belles (1969)
