= Roberta Haynes =

American actress (1927–2019)

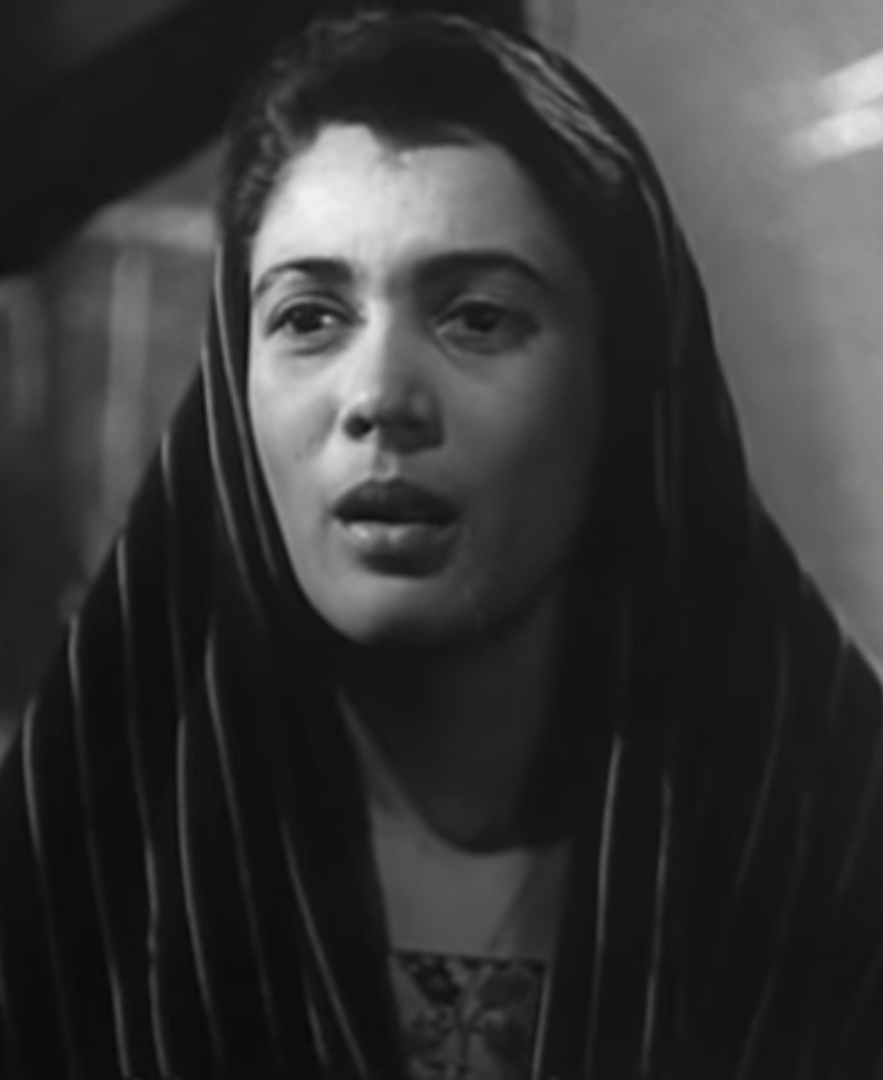
- Haynes in The Fighter (1952)
- Born: Roberta Arline Schack; August 19, 1927; Wichita Falls, Texas, U.S.
- Died: April 4, 2019 (aged 91); Delray Beach, Florida, U.S.
- Resting place: Upolu, Samoa
- Education: HB Studio
- Alma mater: UCLA (attended)
- Occupations: Actress; producer; author
- Years active: 1947–1989
- Spouses: John E. Freund (m. 1945; div. 1946); Jay I. Kanter (m. 1947; div. 1948); Larry M. Ward (m. 1962; div. 1973)
- Children: 1

Roberta Haynes (born Roberta Arline Schack; August 19, 1927 – April 4, 2019) was an American actress who was active from 1947 until 1989.

== Early life ==
She was born Roberta Arline Schack in Wichita Falls, Texas on August 19, 1927, to William Schack and Jewel Eichel Schack. She had one older brother. Her parents were both originally from New York City. Her mother had been a dancer with a Shubert road company and an Eddie Cantor revue. Her father was an electrical engineer; in 1930 he took a job with the Canada Electric Company in Toronto. Canadian border control records from that time identified the family as being of "Hebrew" race. By 1935 the family had moved to Los Angeles, California.

She attended John Burroughs Junior High School through 1942, where the yearbook listed her desired occupation as "actress". She took dancing lessons from an early age, studied with drama coach Grace Bowman, and performed in variety shows for charity. She then went to North Hollywood High School where as a senior she played a 19th Century California senorita in a student stage production. This event marked two "firsts" that would be repeated many times in her long career: getting her photo in the newspaper, and being cast as an ethnic "type".

== Early stage career ==
After graduating from high school in June 1945, "Bobbi" Schack married John E. Freund, who had just received a master's degree at UCLA. The couple moved to New York City, where Freund entered a Ph.D. program at Columbia University, while she studied drama with Herbert Berghof. Schack also took a course in modern dance from Martha Graham. But her marriage ended by January 1946, so Schack returned to Los Angeles and enrolled in classes at UCLA, majoring in Drama and French.

Her first known professional credit as "Roberta Haynes" came in February 1947, with her casting in a production of Charley's Aunt. This old farce hadn't played in Los Angeles for twenty-five years; it was presented by the "Stage Inc." troupe and mounted at the Musart Theater. Critics seemed to like Haynes, despite what was felt to be weak staging, and her photo appeared in several Los Angeles newspapers. For Haynes, it also meant getting her Actors' Equity card.

Her next known performance was an original play by John Bright called City of Angels, which premiered at the Musart Theater in June 1948. Directed by Anthony Quinn, Haynes had a minor role as a pachuca in East Los Angeles who gets swept up in riots following a policeman's murder. The play itself nearly caused a riot; fourteen cast members walked out on opening night due to shoddy production values. When the play finally did open a week later, it was shut down after two nights by the Los Angeles Police, ostensibly because it lacked a permit. They refused to issue a permit until the playwright and producer agreed to drop certain objectionable lines from the script. The play then reopened for another two weeks of performances.

The notoriety of City of Angels coupled with newspapers running photos of Haynes in it may have led to her receiving uncredited parts in two movies, Knock on Any Door and We Were Strangers, filmed in 1948 for release the next year.

Haynes next known stage credit was for Elaine Ryan's adaption of Bemelmans' 1943 novel Now I Lay Me Down To Sleep. The production was produced and directed by Hume Cronyn and combined professional actors with drama students at Stanford University. Performed at Stanford's Memorial Theatre during July 1949, the production starred Jessica Tandy and Akim Tamiroff, with Jeanne Bates, Feodor Chaliapin, Milton Parsons and Haynes as the supporting professionals.

== The Madwoman of Chaillot ==
Haynes went to New York City in September 1949 to make an episode of a combined radio and TV show, Starring Boris Karloff. (She may also have had some expectation of resuming her role in Now I Lay Me Down To Sleep, which Cronyn had sold to new producers for Broadway). This was her first experience with television, which would become her predominant performing medium in later years. While in New York she was offered a part in the touring company for The Madwoman of Chaillot, which she joined in late December 1949. The touring company included Martita Hunt in the title role, with Estelle Winwood, John Carradine, Jacques Aubuchon, Jonathan Harris, Martin Kosleck, Fay Roope and a dozen others.

Haynes, as "Irma the Waitress", replaced Leora Dana, who had been with the play since it opened on Broadway in 1948. Her character had the only romance in the story, with "Pierre the Architect" (Alan Shayne).

The tour played Philadelphia and Detroit, where reviewers mentioned Haynes favorably, Boston, and Baltimore, where the local paper ran a photo of Haynes as "Irma" accepting a flower from John Carradine as "The Ragpicker". By March 1950 it was in Chicago, where the Tribune printed a series of photos illustrating the storyline of the play. The play stayed six weeks at Chicago's Erlanger Theater before moving on to a host of smaller cities.

By June 1950 the production was back on Broadway, where it finished up with a three-week run at the City Center theatre. (Note: According to IBDB this was a standard practice after a successful tour, letting the production go back to Broadway for a brief run at discounted prices) Haynes had clearly established herself as a stage actress with this long tour.

== Back to West Coast ==
In the remaining months of 1950 Haynes did episodes of two New York based shows, Somerset Maugham TV Theatre and the hour-long Pulitzer Prize Playhouse. She did another episode of the former in January 1951. During the fall months of 1950 she also had an understudy role in The House of Bernarda Alba for American National Theater and Academy. By February 1951 Haynes was back on the West Coast, where she and her mother were contestants on a radio quiz show called Managing Editor, broadcast on KGIL.

Haynes appeared as the daughter in a barebones version of Tartuffe, the Imposter during May 1951. Presented at the Ivar Theater in Los Angeles for a two-week run, it starred Sam Jaffe in the title role, with Alec Gerry, D. J. Thompson, William Schallert, Richard Vath, Mira McKinney, Kathleen Freeman, and Lamont Johnson. Albert Band produced and directed the production. While most reviewers praised Haynes performance, one said she was "quite competent but not overly inspired".

Haynes was signed for the cast of High Noon in early September 1951. A columnist who met her that fall on location in Sonora described her: "She's slender, dark-skinned, Latin in looks and not at all a Hollywood 'cover girl' type". Unfortunately, her part in the well-known western classic was cut during editing.

During December 1951 and January 1952 Haynes filmed her brief but important part in The Fighter, where she plays star Richard Conte's doomed fiancé. March 1952 saw the broadcast of the first of two episodes she made for the series Rebound, with the other hitting the airwaves in May.

== Return to Paradise ==
After the disappointment of High Noon Haynes received a second chance to work with Gary Cooper. Producer Theron Warth and director Mark Robson selected her for one of the two female leads in Return to Paradise. Based on James Michener's short story Mr. Morgan set on the fictional island of Matareva, the film was to be shot on location in the South Pacific.

Haynes and director Robson left from Honolulu for the island of Upolu in Western Samoa on May 9, 1952. She would spend a month in the small village of Matautu, Lefaga before the rest of the Hollywood cast and crew arrived, to soak up local customs, speech patterns, and ways of moving. The other female lead was played by local Moira MacDonald, whom Robson had discovered in Apia, the capital of Western Samoa.

Her selection as Cooper's romantic interest after being edited out of High Noon triggered a wave of "Cinderella" themed stories in the press. (MacDonald would play their characters' daughter, the storyline taking place over a period of twenty years).

Haynes would spend four and half months in Samoa making the film. She wrote occasional letters back home from which her mother fed snippets to the local papers, and even spoke with her parents via short-wave radio courtesy of a neighboring ham. She also wrote an article for Jimmie Fidler's syndicated column about her experiences and the film company's progress in making the movie. (Note: Mark Robson wrote a similar article detailing the enormous effort involved in filming at such a remote locale. Over 100 tons of equipment and material had to be shipped out from the states, and several temporary buildings, including a refrigerated storage area for the technicolor film, had to be constructed. See "Life on an Island Paradise" in Los Angeles Daily News for July 10, 1952, page 29)

Location filming completed in late September 1952, and the Hollywood cast flew back to Los Angeles by the end of the month. As in The Fighter, Haynes character would die midway through the film, nevertheless she had finally broken out of ingenue roles into leading woman status. Return to Paradise was released in late July 1953 to a generally favorable reception by critics. Edwin Schallert said "Haynes depicts the native girl Maeva like a native, one of the most convincing portrayals in the picture...". Howard McClay wrote Haynes "brings a warm, almost childlike quality to a role that could easily have been overdone in less understanding hands".

== Controversial photo ==
During October 1952 a full page photo of Haynes appeared on the back cover of a trade magazine that caused a stir in Hollywood. (Note: Columnist Herb Rau said the credit lines on the page read "Lingerie by Juel Park, Photo by John Engstead, Public Relations by Birdwell, Roberta Haynes by God".) According to Hedda Hopper's syndicated column "the Breen Office put in a strong objection to it, and three studios asked to interview Roberta". Louella O. Parsons denounced the photo ad as "bad taste". Y. Frank Freeman issued a statement for the Association of Motion Picture Producers denouncing "salacious" photos of females and warning they would not lead to success.

However, columnists Erskine Johnson and Sheilah Graham both wrote in praise of Haynes and her career prospects. Parsons reversed herself quickly when it became known that Columbia had signed Haynes to a contract, stating the photo ad wasn't Haynes fault. Haynes told her side of the story to journalist Aline Mosby in a later interview carried by UPI. The interview reproduced the photo, letting readers judge for themselves.

== Columbia contract ==
Shortly after returning to the states, Haynes option with Aspen Productions (Note: This was director Mark Robson, producer Theron Warth, and financier Harry Lenart. Gary Cooper was also part owner of Aspen, which wasn't widely known) was picked up for a picture per year over four years time. It was not an exclusive contract, so Haynes was free to take on other work when Aspen didn't need her.

When Columbia signed Haynes to a long-term contract in December 1952, (Note: Columbia may have bought out her Aspen contract; nothing more is heard of it) the prevailing rumor was that she would be cast in From Here to Eternity. She was given five screen tests for the part that eventually went to Donna Reed. The rumor reported by Sheilah Graham was that producer Jerry Wald wanted Haynes, but director Fred Zinneman didn't. Harry Cohn cast the tie-breaker, giving the nod to Donna Reed.

Haynes was then said to be set for a 3-D remake of Golden Boy called Strong Arm, which would co-star Broderick Crawford and John Derek, but the project was abandoned. Sent out on a tour to the East Coast to promote Return to Paradise for Aspen Productions, Haynes alarmed her new bosses at Columbia with her frankness in interviews:

[The Samoans] can't pronounce their R's... They always talk about when the U.S. Malines were there. The Malines left about 1800 children there.

[Samoa] is about 90 miles long and 30 miles wide, and supports about 30,000 people, of whom only 300 are European. About half of that small group are of mixed blood. Segregation is unknown. For that, you have to go to American Samoa, about 90 miles away.

Haynes learned from the newspapers that she had been assigned a role with Rock Hudson in a 3-D western called Gun Fury. The film would also star Donna Reed, an irony not lost on columnists aware of their rivalry for From Here to Eternity. Two weeks of location shooting in Sedona, Arizona wrapped up in early June 1953 and production moved back to the Columbia ranch in California.

While she was still working on Gun Fury and awaiting release of Return to Paradise, Columbia announced Haynes would be starred in another 3-D western, The Nebraskan. She would have top billing with Phil Carey, who had also been on Gun Fury. (Note: Billed as "Philip Carey" at Warner Brothers, when he signed at Columbia in 1953 it was decided to shorten his stage name. He returned to "Philip" after leaving Columbia) The Nebraskan went into production during late June 1953, completing location shooting at Burro's Flats in early July.

After finishing both Gun Fury and The Nebraskan, Haynes was asked to do a third western. She would again be the secondary female lead, playing an Apache girl, in Massacre at Moccasin Pass. Set to star Phil Carey and Audrey Totter, Charlita was cast when Haynes declined, and the film was eventually renamed to Massacre Canyon.

Her Columbia contract ran through December, but Haynes was too bitter about the "quickie" westerns and her secondary roles to stay. She forgo a settlement and was released from her contract at the end of September 1953.

== Abroad ==
Haynes made the second of two appearances on Juke Box Jury for 1953 at the end of October. (Note: This long-running CBS music show had celebrity judges giving their opinions on recorded songs) For some time snippets had appeared in newspapers that Haynes was learning Italian in preparation for making films abroad. However, before going to Europe she committed to a service tour of Korea. Johnny Grant took Haynes, Merry Anders, Terry Moore, and others in December 1953 to entertain US military personnel stationed there for Christmas and New Year's. When Haynes returned to Hollywood in January 1954, she gave a candid interview about the trip.

In late May 1954 Haynes sailed from New York City to Le Havre for a year's stay abroad. Her parents informed the local paper she would be doing some television in Paris, and later going to Rome for a new film. She was reported to have signed in Rome for a role in Garden of the Semiramis, to start filming in October. She was also reported to have signed in February 1955 for a film to be called Bombay Flight. (Note: This may be the Anglo-Indian film Three Headed Cobra which was also known as Bombay Flight 417; if so, Haynes is not listed among the cast) She is credited on IMDb with a 1955 Franco-Italian film called Tua per la vita, for which she was either a very minor actor or possibly provided English dialogue. She did one episode of the syndicated series Captain Gallant of the Foreign Legion while in Italy.

She returned to Paris in June 1955, to make an episode of the television series Sherlock Holmes. While there, producer-director Sheldon Reynolds also persuaded Haynes to do a cameo in his film Foreign Intrigue. Haynes returned to the US in late July 1955.

== Television 1956-1960 ==
During December 1955 Jon Hall cast Haynes in two half hour pilot episodes for a new series called Knight of the South Seas, in which he would star. Hall and Haynes visited Allentown, Pennsylvania in March 1956 for a department store opening and to promote the new series. Haynes pretended to not know English, while Hall introduced her as a Parisian starlet and translated for her. A reporter bought it completely and the story appeared that way in the local paper (without a byline, fortunately for the reporter). (Note: Haynes motivation for this bit of foolery was due to a recent Earl Wilson column in which he asked about whatever happened to Roberta Haynes. Hall, raised in Tahiti, was fluent in French, probably far more so than Haynes.) The pilots never sold, so Hall combined them with additional footage for a film called Hell Ship Mutiny, released in 1957, which would be Haynes last film for a decade.

For the next five years Haynes screen work would be confined to television. She appeared on a local primetime quiz show Mr. Genius during January 1956. The next month she made an episode of Warner Bros. Presents, for its Casablanca series. During March she appeared on an episode of Crusader. She made another episode for Warner Bros. Presents in October 1956, this time for its Conflict series.

For the 1956-57 holiday season, Haynes once again volunteered for a tour to entertain US servicemen. This time she would head a unit of entertainers visiting European posts. Upon return to the US, Haynes next performing work was a live color broadcast of Matinee Theater for The Importance of Being Earnest in February 1957. She did another Matinee Theater in April, this time for the Old Testament story of Joseph and his brothers. She did an episode of Climax! in June, and an episode of M Squad in October 1957.

Haynes did another Matinee Theater in March 1958, and an episode of United States Steel Hour in early June. She performed in a Studio One story in September.

The year 1959 was the high point in Haynes television career; she did six different series, including Behind Closed Doors, The Lawless Years, Not For Hire, One Step Beyond, Black Saddle, and Richard Diamond, Private Detective. During this year she also made some pilot episodes for a new MGM series called Provost Marshall, which co-starred Ralph Meeker and Mari Blanchard.

July 1959 saw her return to the stage for the first time in eight years. She appeared in Look Back in Anger at the Laguna Beach Playhouse, with Don Harron, Marcia Henderson, Michael Gibson, and Nelson Welch. Reviewer Velma Dunlap credited Haynes with "a very good performance" in this production directed by Patrick Macnee.

Haynes had episodes of five series broadcast in 1960, all within the first three months. She guest-starred in The Man and the Challenge, Lawman, The Rebel, Hawaiian Eye, and Johnny Staccato. The last named had her playing a woman blinded in an accident, foreshadowing her own life.

== Later career ==
Eye injuries from explosions and gunfire during the making of a Western film kept Haynes out of acting for eight years (1960–1967). Two operations restored her sight after "She lost virtually all of her vision and faced the prospect of permanent blindness". It's not known for which film or TV episode this accident occurred.

Her first known performing credit in eight years was a cameo in the film Point Blank, released in October 1967. She served as a dialogue coach for the Franco-Italian The Thirteen Chairs in 1969, and did minor bits in four films over the next three years: The Adventurers (1970), The Martlet's Tale (1970), Valdez Is Coming (1971), and Pete 'n' Tillie (1972).

She resumed television acting in 1973 with a part in an episode of The F.B.I.. Thereafter, she would alternate acting with producing roles for television, doing two TV movies in the latter capacity: Summer Girl (1978) and Nowhere to Hide (1983). Her final acting roles on television were all minor bits, including a TV movie The Rules of Marriage and the series Falcon Crest in 1982, and episodes of Knots Landing and Knight Rider in 1986. Her final performing credit was for the 1989 film Police Academy 6: City Under Siege.

Haynes and Wende Hyland co-authored a compilation of interviews with Hollywood professionals called How to Make It in Hollywood. Published in 1975, it contained interviews with producers, directors, agents, and casting directors, as well as performers such as Jack Lemmon and Walter Matthau. The book was well received by critics and was recommended reading by Joseph Bernard, executive director of the Lee Strasberg Theatre Institute.

== Personal life ==
Haynes and talent agent Jay Kanter took out a marriage license in late September 1947. The actual ceremony was held in late November at the backyard of her parents home in North Hollywood. There is no public record of their divorce available, though columnist Edith Gwynn reported it lasted only six months.

Haynes was allergic to nuts; upon return from Samoa in September 1952 she had dinner at a Chinese restaurant in Waikiki with other members of the film company. One dish contained finely chopped nuts. Haynes suffered an allergic reaction, began convulsing, and had to spend the night in a hospital emergency room. She recovered quickly and was able to fly to Los Angeles the next day.

She had an on-again, off-again romance with Marlon Brando during the early 1950s.

Columnist Lee Berg described her in an interview: "Roberta is a tense, enigmatic young lady, who conceals her drive behind a placid exterior and a gentle voice that is almost a whisper". Sidney Skolsky wrote "She always looks sad, as if she had just finished singing a torch song". He added that she lived by herself in a modest Hollywood apartment, did her own housekeeping and cooking, loved coffee, and dressed more for comfort than style. Haynes had brown hair and dark brown eyes, was 5 ft 3 1/2 in (161.3 cm) tall and weighed 114 pounds (52 kg) at age 24.

As Roberta Schack, Haynes married actor Larry M. Ward in Las Vegas, Nevada during August 1962. The couple had one son together, Haynes only child. Their relationship was creative as well as personal, as they collaborated on screenplays (A Free Trip to Naples, French Leave) and a novel. They divorced in Los Angeles during February 1973.

Haynes attended LSD therapy sessions.

Roberta Haynes died on April 4, 2019, in Delray Beach, Florida at the age of 91. She was cremated, and the following July her family took her ashes to Samoa, where they were interred during a public ceremony at the Return to Paradise Resort.

== Stage performances ==
Listed by year of first performance (excluding student productions)
| Year | Play | Role | Venue | Notes |
|---|---|---|---|---|
| 1946 | Charley's Aunt | Amy Spettigue | Musart Theater | Three-week run drew praise for Haynes but not the production |
| 1948 | City of Angels | | Musart Theater | Drama about ethnic tensions in East L.A. suffered through a cast revolt and later provoked a police shutdown |
| 1949 | Now I Lay Me Down To Sleep | | Memorial Theatre | Hume Cronyn was artist-in-residence at Stanford when he directed this play |
| 1949 | The Madwoman of Chaillot | Irma | Touring Company | Twenty-week tour saw Haynes join in late December 1949 through May 1950 |
| 1950 | Madwoman of Chaillot | Irma | City Center | Production returned to Broadway for 17 performances after tour finished |
| 1950 | House of Bernarda Alba | (Understudy) | ANTA Theatre | |
| 1951 | Tartuffe, the Imposter | Marianne | Ivar Theater | This was the Old Vic version, cut down to two acts with long speeches omitted |
| 1959 | Look Back in Anger | Helena Charles | Laguna Beach Playhouse | Two-week run for this Irish Players/Michael Gibson production |

== Filmography ==
Film (by year of first release)
| Year | Title | Role | Notes |
|---|---|---|---|
| 1949 | Knock on Any Door | Woman | Uncredited |
| 1949 | We Were Strangers | Lolita Valdés | Uncredited |
| 1952 | High Noon | | Haynes part in this classic film wound up on the cutting room floor |
| 1952 | The Fighter | Nevis | The death of Haynes character early in the film drives the plot |
| 1953 | Return to Paradise | Maeva | Filmed on location in Samoa; playing Gary Cooper's love interest was the high point of her film career |
| 1953 | Gun Fury | Estella Morales | |
| 1953 | The Nebraskan | Mrs. Paris Elliott | |
| 1955 | Tua per la vita | | Franco-Italian production filmed in Italy |
| 1956 | Foreign Intrigue | | Haynes, Paulette Goddard, Dawn Addams, and Mary Sinclair had cameos in this |
| 1957 | Hell Ship Mutiny | Princess Mareva | Spliced together from two unsold TV pilots and location footage |
| 1967 | Point Blank | Mrs. Carter | Cameo appearance marked her return to acting after eight years |
| 1969 | The Thirteen Chairs | (Dialogue Coach) | Franco-Italian production with Orson Welles and Sharon Tate |
| 1970 | The Adventurers | Dax's Mother | Uncredited |
| 1970 | The Martlet's Tale | | Italian-made film |
| 1971 | Valdez Is Coming | Polly | Uncredited |
| 1972 | Pete 'n' Tillie | Woman at Party | Uncredited |
| 1989 | Police Academy 6: City Under Siege | Bus Passenger | |
| 2004 | The Copper Scroll of Mary Magdalene | Mary the Mother | Filmed in Tunisia during 1970's but only released after death of director Larry Buchanan |

Television (in original broadcast order)
| Year | Series | Episode | Role | Notes |
|---|---|---|---|---|
| 1949 | Starring Boris Karloff | Mad Illusion | | ABC show from New York may have been filmed rather than a live broadcast |
| 1950 | Somerset Maugham TV Theatre | (Unknown Episode) | | Her first appearance on this show is known only from a newspaper column |
| 1950 | Pulitzer Prize Playhouse | The Ponzi Story | | Her appearance on this show is known only from a newspaper column |
| 1951 | Somerset Maugham TV Theatre | Honolulu | Island Girl | With Luther Adler |
| 1952 | Rebound | The Prize | Janie | Lawyer (John Ridgely) and wife (Haynes) hide fugitive |
| 1952 | Rebound | The Henchman | | |
| 1952 | Invitation Playhouse | Lucky Money | | Taxi driver is given fake $20 bill. With Tom D'Andrea and Jimmy Cross |
| 1953 | Juke Box Jury | (1953-06-27) | Herself | Fellow judges were Mickey Rooney, Tom Drake, Coleen Gray, and Richard Jaeckel |
| 1953 | Juke Box Jury | (1953-10-31) | Herself | Fellow judges were Jan Clayton, Katy Jurado, Norm Van Brocklin, and Herb Jeffries |
| 1955 | Sherlock Holmes | The Case of the Night Train Riddle | Lydia | Filmed in Paris |
| 1955 | Captain Gallant of the Foreign Legion | Pipeline | Kelly Mitchell | Filmed in Italy |
| 1955 | Paris Precinct | | | Another show filmed in Paris, known only from a later interview |
| 1956 | Mr. Genius | (1956-01-25) | Herself | Quiz show in which panellists try to beat Mr. Genius in answering questions |
| 1956 | Crusader | The Threshold | Anya | Set in Berlin, with Brian Keith, Corey Allen, and Nan Boardman |
| 1956 | Casablanca | Siren Song | Maria Valenti | This was part of the wheel series Warner Bros. Presents |
| 1956 | Conflict | Silent Journey | Maria | Haynes plays mother of deaf-mute Mexican boy |
| 1957 | Matinee Theater | The Importance of Being Earnest | Gwendolyn Fairfax | With Hermione Gingold, Roger Moore, and Philip Tonge |
| 1957 | Matinee Theater | The Story of Joseph | Potiphar's Wife | Stars Brett Halsey, with Nan Boardman, Forrest Taylor, and Paul Lambert |
| 1957 | Climax! | The Man Who Stole the Bible | | |
| 1957 | M Squad | Pete Loves Mary | Mary Kearney | Haynes plays girl of escaped con (Mike Connors) |
| 1958 | Matinee Theater | The Prophet Hosea | Gomer | Haynes deserts Hosea (Joseph Wiseman) for a priest (Robert Loggia) |
| 1958 | The United States Steel Hour | A Family Alliance | Dorie Schaeffer | Small town boy (Bill Hayes) and girl (Florence Henderson) meet in New York |
| 1958 | Studio One | No Place to Run | Amy Garnet | Haynes plays wife of blackmailer (Barry Atwater); with Harry Townes and Rosemary DeCamp |
| 1959 | Behind Closed Doors | The Quemoy Story | Anna Sung | Haynes is Eurasian agent for US, kidnapped in Macau |
| 1959 | The Lawless Years | Lucky Silva | Petrina Nuccio | |
| 1959 | Not For Hire | The Soldier's Story | Cleo | |
| 1959 | One Step Beyond | Forked Lightning | Ellen Chambers | Bank employee (Ralph Nelson) defies wife's premonition |
| 1959 | Black Saddle | Apache Trail | Chata | Haynes plays an Apache woman seeking vengenance |
| 1959 | Richard Diamond, Private Detective | The Caller | Audry Billings | Diamond (David Janssen) gets mysterious phone calls while romancing Haynes |
| 1960 | The Man and the Challenge | The Storm | Patricia Halakua | |
| 1960 | Lawman | The Showdown | Mattie Creedy | |
| 1960 | The Rebel | Gold Seeker | Destarte | Once again Haynes is an Apache woman who gets killed |
| 1960 | Hawaiian Eye | A Cut of Ice | Alice Thomas | Haynes plays a doubly treacherous receptionist |
| 1960 | Johnny Staccato | The Mask of Jason | Betty Bryn | Foreshadowing... Haynes plays a woman blinded by accident |
| 1973 | The F.B.I. | The Big Job | Landlady | |
| 1977 | Nowhere to Hide | (TV Movie) | (Associate Producer) | |
| 1982 | The Rules of Marriage | (TV Movie) | Elaine Fine | |
| 1982 | Knots Landing | Abby's Choice | Anesthesiologist #2 | |
| 1983 | Summer Girl | (TV Movie) | (Producer) | |
| 1986 | Falcon Crest | Conundrum | Donna Nettles | |
| 1986 | Knight Rider | Deadly Knightshade | Maid | |
| 1988 | The Secret Life of Kathy McCormick | (TV Movie) | Woman #2 | |
