= Silao Vaisola-Sefo =

Samoan rugby union player

Lemalu Silao Vaisola-Sefo MNZM
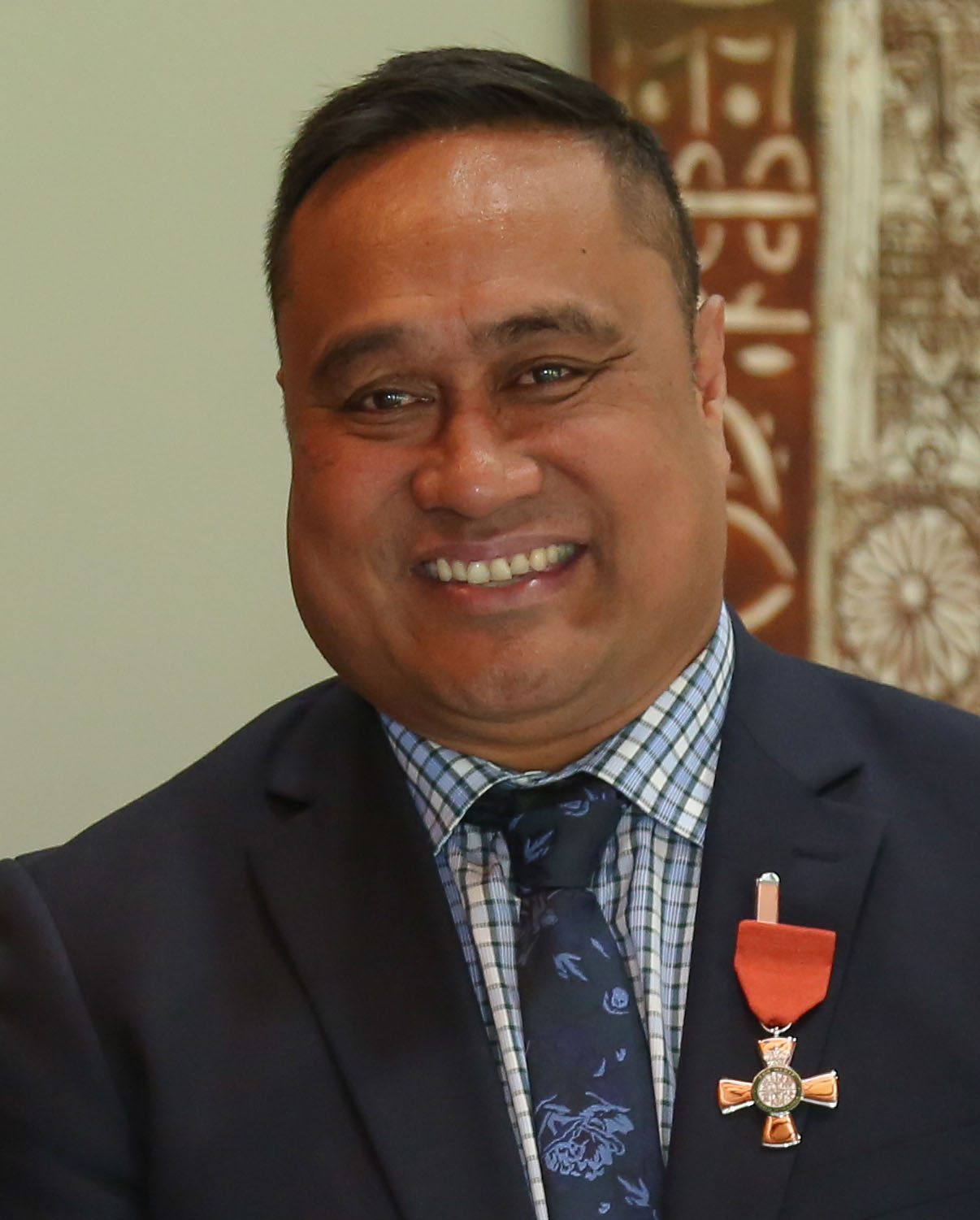
- Vaisola-Sefo in 2024
- Born: Silao Vaisola-Sefo; 15 January 1979 (age 47) Lefaga, Samoa
- Height: 1.89 m (6 ft 2 1/2 in)
- Weight: 108 kg (238 lb)
- University: University of Otago
- Occupation: Health administrator

Rugby union career
- Position: Hooker
International career
Years	Team	Apps	(Points)
2007	Samoa	1	(0)

Lemalu Silao Vaisola-Sefo MNZM (born 15 January 1979) is a New Zealand health administrator and former Samoan rugby union prop.

== Biography ==
Vaisola-Sefo was born in Gagaifo o le Vao. His chiefly title—Lemalu—is from Matautu, Lefaga.

Vaisola-Sefo was a member of the Samoa national rugby union team and participated with the squad at the 2007 Rugby World Cup.

Vaisola-Sefo was employed by Counties Manukau District Health Board. He moved to South Seas Healthcare in 2013 and became the group's chief executive officer in 2016. He holds three degrees and has graduated from the University of Otago. He graduated with a bachelor of commerce majoring in management, tourism and sports.

In the 2024 New Year Honours, Vaisola-Sefo was appointed a Member of the New Zealand Order of Merit, for services to Pacific health.
