= Tupua Tigafua =

Samoan choreographer and dancer based in New Zealand

Tupua Tigafua is a Samoan choreographer and dancer based in New Zealand. Tigafua was a recipient of the Creative New Zealand Arts Pasifika Award for Emerging Artist in 2017. In 2021, the Wellington Theatre Awards presented him with the Excellence Award for Choreography and Movement for original work Ciggy Butts in the Sand.

== Early life ==
Born in Mount Wellington, Auckland. Tigafua is of Samoan descent with links to Safa’ato’a, Lefaga and Faleū, Manono. The youngest of five siblings, he was a practitioner of Samoan and Tongan dance. Tigafua's first attempt to transition to contemporary dance resulted in not completing studies at Unitec.

== Career ==
At 20 years of age, Tigafua was approached to dance with Black Grace, which he did for three years. Soon he was to follow it up with a stint in Lemi Ponifasio's Mau. The company's work was based primarily in Berlin centred around stories of immigrants who lived in the city. In 2012 he joined The New Zealand Dance Company and four years later, Tigafua made the decision to continue as an independent choreographer and dancer.

“It’s important to tell, or to add to our conversation but not to repeat the same thing or say it louder. From my perspective as New Zealand-born I got to travel a lot so you learn to be more curious about things around you — like the garage drink-up but I’m adding my perspective.” (Tigafua)

== Performances, Choreography and Works ==
2012-2014 Language of Living, The New Zealand Dance Company, New Zealand

2013-2015 Rotunda, The New Zealand Dance Company, Australia, Netherlands, New Zealand

2015-2017 Double Derelicts, White Face Crew, Kia Mau Festival, Wellington, Matariki on the Move programme, Auckland, Centrepoint Theatre, Palmerston North, Hawkes Bay Arts Festival, Hamilton Gardens Festival, New Zealand

2016 Lumina, The New Zealand Dance Company, Germany, Holland, New Zealand

2016 Plan B, SIVA, Niu Sila, Auckland Tempo Dance Festival, Q Theatre, Auckland, New Zealand

2016 Ghostdance, Brouhaha, The New Zealand Dance Company, White Night, Auckland Arts Festival

2018 Home Sweet Home, Search Engine, Footnote New Zealand Dance, New Zealand

2019 Shel We? Kia Mau Festival, Wellington, New Zealand

2019 Alofagia:Le Opera, TAPA, Auckland Council, Nathan Homestead, Manurewa Local Board, Auckland, New Zealand

2020 Ngā Wai, Rangatira, Atamira Dance Company, The New Zealand Dance Company, Q Theatre, Auckland, New Zealand

2021 Songs of Protest, Toi Whakaari, Wellington, New Zealand

2021 Shel We? Pacific Dance Festival, ASB Waterfront Theatre, Auckland New Zealand

2021 Ciggy Butts in the Sand, Te Papa Soundings Theatre, Wellington, New Zealand

== Awards ==
2021 Shel We? Excellence Award for Choreography and Movement, The Wellington Theatre Awards

2017 Emerging Artist Award, Creative New Zealand Pasifika Arts

== External References ==
1. Studio Cam 2014 Tupua Tigafua's Dreamy McFloat https://www.youtube.com/watch?v=frnISMVa4t4
2. The New Zealand Dance Company Short Series 4: Tupua Tigafua Language of Living photo shoot https://www.youtube.com/watch?v=eiBCInHwtDI
3. Tupua Tigafua discussing work Home Sweet Home https://www.youtube.com/watch?v=NzuiUsZwQCc
