= Return to Paradise =

Return to Paradise may refer to:

== Film and television ==
- Return to Paradise (1935 film), a French film directed by Serge de Poligny
- Return to Paradise (1953 film), an adaptation of James Michener's book (see below), directed by Mark Robson
- Return to Paradise (1998 film), a remake of the 1989 French film Force majeure, directed by Joseph Ruben
- Return to Paradise (Philippine TV series), a 2022 Philippine drama romance series
- Return to Paradise (2024 TV series), an Australian-British crime drama TV series

== Literature ==
- Return to Paradise (short story collection), a 1951 novel by James A. Michener
- Return to Paradise, a 1992 book by Breyten Breytenbach

== Music ==
- Return to Paradise (Randy Stonehill album), 1989
- Return to Paradise (Sam Sparro album) or the title song, 2012
- Return to Paradise (Styx album), 1997
- "Return to Paradise", a song by Elton John from A Single Man, 1978
- "Return to Paradise", a song by X-Perience from Lost in Paradise, 2006
- "Return to Paradise", a song written by Dimitri Tiomkin and Ned Washington for the 1953 film
