= Lefaga =

Coordinates: 13.955°S 171.959°W

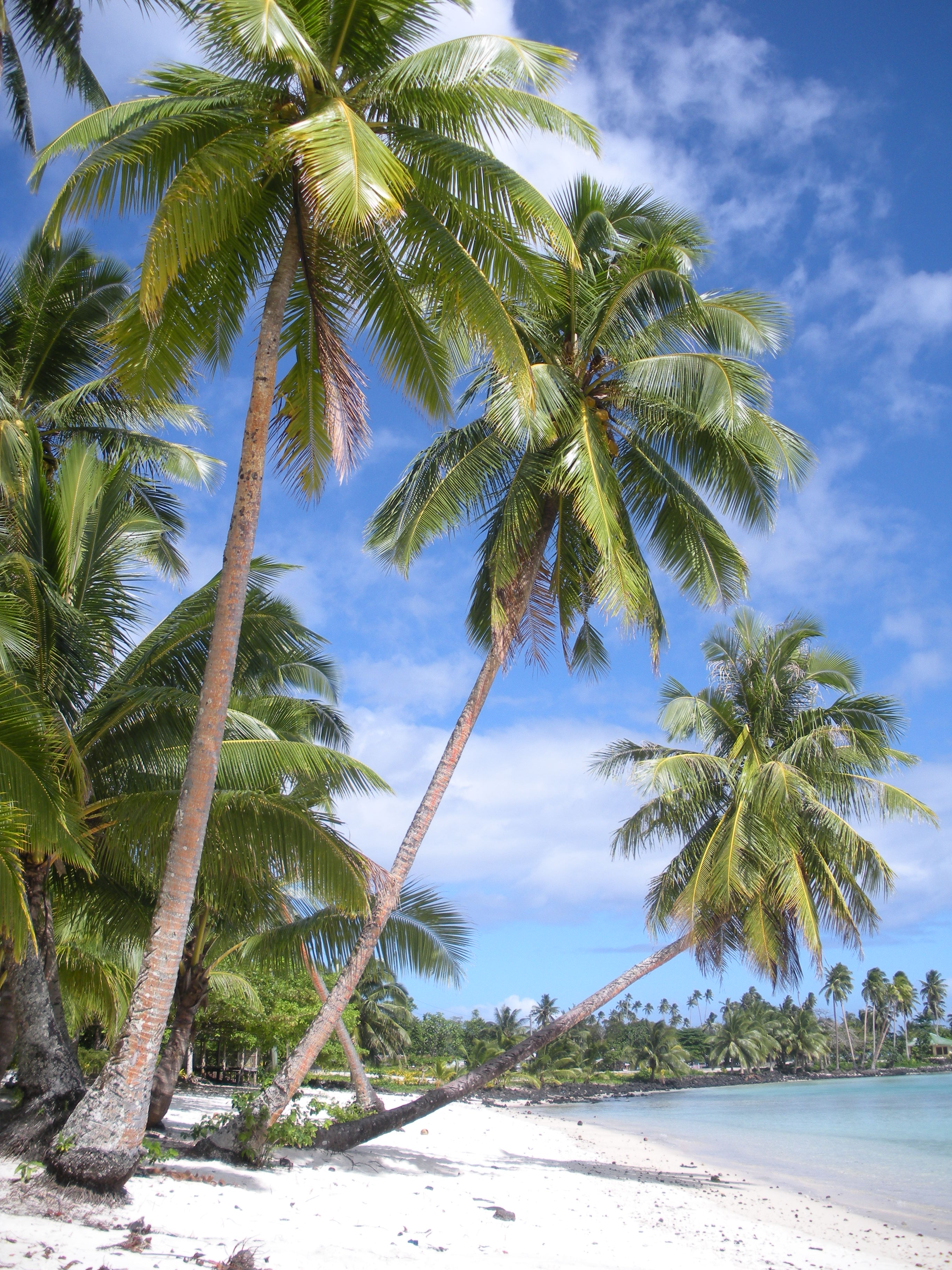
Return to Paradise beach, Lefaga, 2009

Lefaga is a village district on the south west coast of the island of Upolu in Samoa. The American movie Return to Paradise (1953), starring Gary Cooper was filmed at Matautu village in Lefaga. The 50th anniversary celebrations of the making of the movie took place in Lefaga in November 2003.

A number of villages and districts in Samoa are called 'Matautu.'

There are seven sub-villages, pito nu'u in Lefaga;

- Safa'atoa
- Matafa'a
- Falese'ela
- Tafagamanu
- Savaia
- Gagaifo o le Vao
- Matautu (Lefaga)

Lefaga was one of the areas hit by the 2009 Samoa earthquake and tsunami with fatalities and extensive damage.
