= Nebraskan =

Nebraskan may refer to:

- A person from the U.S. state of Nebraska
- Daily Nebraskan, the student newspaper of the University of Nebraska–Lincoln
- The Nebraskan, a 1953 American Western film
- Nebraskan stage, a discarded geological period now incorporated in the Pre-Illinoian stage
