= The Bridges at Toko-ri (novel) =

1953 novella by James A. Michener

- First edition cover
- Author: James A. Michener
- Cover artist: H. Lawrence Hoffman
- Language: English
- Publisher: Random House
- Publication date: 1953
- Publication place: United States
- Media type: print
- Pages: 147
- ISBN: 0-394-41780-1

The Bridges at Toko-ri (1953) is a novella by American author James A. Michener. The book details the experiences of United States Navy pilots in the Korean War as they undertake a mission to destroy heavily protected bridges in enemy territory.

== Influences ==
In 1951, Michener, a former United States Navy officer, was an embedded reporter with the Navy's Task Force 77. He was on the aircraft carriers USS Essex (CV-9) and USS Valley Forge (CV-45) offshore in Korea, and wrote for The Saturday Evening Post and Reader's Digest on the Korean air war. The rescue climax of the story echoes the exploits of Lt. John Kelvin Koelsch who was the first helicopter pilot awarded the Medal of Honor and Duane Thorin, a helicopter pilot on the USS Rochester (CA-124).

== Film adaptation ==
The Bridges at Toko-ri was made into a film of the same name and released in 1955 by Paramount Pictures, just two years after the book's publication. Starring William Holden and Grace Kelly, it was directed by Mark Robson, who had also brought Return to Paradise, another Michener book, to screen one year earlier. Commander Marshall Beebe who led the Carrier Squadron when Michener was aboard acted as technical adviser to the film and had a cameo role in the film as a pilot.

The giant pistons that launched the fighting planes into the air were found in the catapult room of the carrier and as a cure for loss of nerve Brubaker stood in the catapult room where the piston swung back within inches of his face and he without flinching was braced by the exposure to the immediate halting proximity of the immensity of the force. This was eliminated from the film and was replaced with the airman simply standing on the prow of the carrier allowing the swiftly passing salt air to refresh his spirit.
