= Return to Warbow =

1958 film by Ray Nazarro

- Theatrical release poster
- Directed by: Ray Nazarro
- Written by: Les Savage Jr.
- Screenplay by: Les Savage Jr.
- Based on: Return to Warbow by Les Savage Jr.
- Produced by: Wallace MacDonald
- Starring: Philip Carey
- Cinematography: Henry Freulich
- Color process: Technicolor
- Production company: Columbia Pictures
- Distributed by: Columbia Pictures
- Release date: January 1958
- Running time: 67 minutes
- Country: United States
- Language: English

Return to Warbow is a 1958 American Western film directed by Ray Nazarro and starring Philip Carey. The film is based on the novel Return to Warbow by Les Savage Jr. (New York, 1955).

== Plot ==
Philip Carey plays Clay Hollister, an escaped prisoner, who returns to his native town of Warbow together with two accomplices, Red and Johnny, to recover $30,000 that he stashed there 11 years before. To achieve his goal, he takes local boy David Fallam (Christopher Olsen) hostage—only to learn later that the boy is his son.

== Cast ==
- Philip Carey as Clay Hollister
- Catherine McLeod as Kathleen Fallam
- Andrew Duggan as Murray Fallam
- William Leslie as Johnny
- Robert J. Wilke as Red
- James Griffith as Frank Hollister
- Jay Silverheels as Indian Joe
- Christopher Olsen as David Fallam
- Harry Lauter as Tom - Deputy Sheriff
- Francis DeSales as Sheriff

== Production ==
The film was shot at the Corriganville Ranch at Simi Valley and the Iverson Movie Ranch at Chatsworth, Los Angeles, California, from July 22 to August 2, 1957.
