= Penny Santon =

American film, stage and television actress (1916–1999)

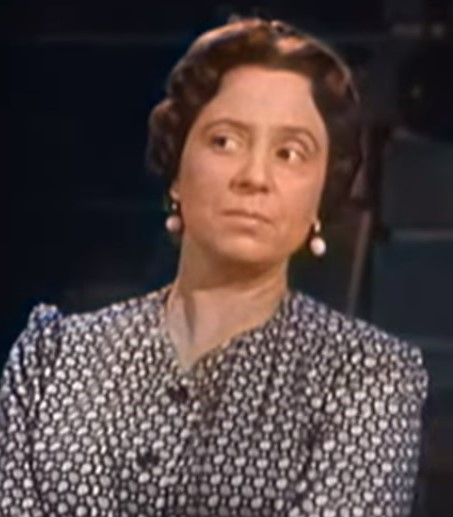
- Santon in The Adventures of Jim Bowie (1956)
- Born: Pierina Burlando; September 2, 1916; New York, U.S.
- Died: May 12, 1999 (aged 82); Burbank, California, U.S.
- Occupation: Actress
- Years active: 1952–1999

Penny Santon (born Pierina Burlando, September 2, 1916 – May 12, 1999) was an American film, stage and television actress, who played the role of Mama Rosa Novelli in the American crime drama television series Matt Houston. Santon died in May 1999 in Burbank, California, at the age of 82.

== Partial filmography ==
- Interrupted Melody (1955) - Madame Gilly's Secretary (uncredited)
- Alfred Hitchcock Presents (1956) (Season 2 Episode 6: "Toby") as Italian Tenant
- The Wrong Man (1956) – Spanish Woman (uncredited)
- Full of Life (1956) – Carla Rocco
- Dino (1957) – Mrs. Minetta
- This Earth Is Mine (1959) – Mrs. Petucci
- Cry Tough (1959) – Señora Estrada
- The Miracle (1959) – Undetermined Secondary Role (uncredited)
- West Side Story (1961) – Madam Lucia (uncredited)
- Lover Come Back (1961) – Hotel Maid (uncredited)
- Rawhide (1961) (Season 4 Episode 1: "Rio Salado") – Servant
- California (1963) – Dona Ana Sofia Hicenta
- Love with the Proper Stranger (1963) – Mama Rossini
- Captain Newman, M.D. (1963) – Waitress at Blue Grotto (uncredited)
- Wagon Train (1963) (Season 6 Episode 27: "The Adam MacKenzie Story") – Carlota Perez
- The Spy in the Green Hat (1967) – Grandma Monteri
- Don't Just Stand There! (1968) – Renée
- Funny Girl (1968) – Mrs. Meeker
- Kotch (1971) – Mrs. Segura
- Laverne & Shirley (1978) (Season 4 Episodes 1 and 2: "The Festival") – Grandma DeFazio
- The Last Word (1979) – Mrs. Tempino
- Rhinestone (1984) – Mother
- Fletch (1985) – Velma Stanwyk
- Short Circuit (1986) – Mrs. Cepeda
- One Good Cop (1991) – Mrs. Cristofaro
- Friends (1997) (Season 3 Episode 11: "The One Where Chandler Can't Remember Which Sister") – Nonna
