= California (1963 film) =

1963 film by Hamil Petroff

- Directed by: Hamil Petroff
- Screenplay by: James West
- Story by: James West
- Produced by: Hamil Petroff
- Starring: Jock Mahoney; Faith Domergue
- Cinematography: Ed Fitzgerald
- Edited by: Bert Honey
- Music by: Richard LaSalle
- Color process: Black and white
- Production company: Caren Productions
- Distributed by: American International Pictures
- Release date: March 3, 1963
- Running time: 76 minutes
- Country: United States
- Language: English

California is a 1963 American Western film directed by Hamil Petroff and starring Jock Mahoney and Faith Domergue.

== Plot ==
Revolutionaries rise up against the Mexican government in California in 1841. Mexican general Don Francisco Hernandez pits his troops against a tenacious team of revolutionaries led by his half-brother Don Michael O'Casey. Marianna De La Rosa is an heiress pledged to marry Don Francisco although she secretly loves Don Michael.

== Cast ==
- Jock Mahoney as Don Michael O'Casey
- Faith Domergue as Carlotta Torres
- Michael Pate as Don Francisco Hernandez
- Susan Seaforth Hayes as Marianna De La Rosa (as Susan Seaforth)
- Rodolfo Hoyos Jr. as Padre Soler (as Rodolfo Hoyos)
- Penny Santon as Dona Ana Sofia Hicenta
- Jimmy Murphy as Jacinto
- Nestor Paiva as Gen. Micheltorena
- Roberto Contreras as Lt. Sanchez (as Roberto Contreres)
- Felix Locher as Don Pablo Hernandez
- Charles Horvath as Manuel

== Production ==
The film was shot on the old Republic lot. The sword fight at the end was director Hamil Petroff's last-minute idea and it did not appear in the original script.

== See also ==
- List of American films of 1963
