= We Were Strangers =

1949 film

- Theatrical poster
- Directed by: John Huston
- Written by: John Huston; Peter Viertel
- Based on: Rough Sketch by Robert Sylvester
- Produced by: Sam Spiegel
- Starring: Jennifer Jones; John Garfield; Pedro Armendáriz; Gilbert Roland; Ramon Novarro; Wally Cassell; David Bond
- Cinematography: Russell Metty
- Edited by: Al Clark
- Music by: George Antheil
- Color process: Black and white
- Production company: Horizon Pictures
- Distributed by: Columbia Pictures
- Release date: April 27, 1949
- Running time: 106 minutes
- Country: United States
- Language: English

We Were Strangers is a 1949 American adventure drama film directed by John Huston and starring Jennifer Jones and John Garfield. Set in 1933, the film concerns a group of revolutionaries attempting to overthrow the Cuban government of Gerardo Machado. The story is based loosely on an episode in Robert Sylvester's novel Rough Sketch and draws on historical events.

== Plot ==
A group of revolutionaries plot to bring down their corrupt government. China Valdés is a bank clerk whose brother Manolo distributes anti-government flyers. She watches as a plain clothes police officer guns him down on the steps of the University of Havana. She vows to kill his assassin, Armando Ariete. At Manolo's funeral, Tony Fenner, an American, asks her to join his anti-government underground group instead of taking revenge on her own.

When Fenner learns that China's house is next to a cemetery, he devises a scheme to dig a tunnel from China's house and under the cemetery, then assassinate prominent senior government official Contreras whose family plot is in that cemetery, and detonate a bomb during Contreras' funeral, killing the government officials among the mourners. His disparate group of tunnelers includes dockworker Guillermo Montilla, bicycle mechanic Miguel, and graduate student Ramón Sánchez. The revolutionaries spend days digging the tunnel, and struggle with the fact that they will kill some officials who are less than entirely evil and also take the lives of innocent bystanders. Ramón goes mad thinking of these issues, and wanders off and dies in a traffic accident. Meanwhile, Ariete harasses China, jealous of her relationship with Fenner, whom he has learned is actually Cuban by birth.

When the tunnel is ready, Contreras is assassinated as planned. A munitions expert prepares to set the bomb in place, but they learn that the burial will not take place at the family tomb as expected, and their plan has failed. They make arrangements for Fenner to leave Cuba before he is arrested by Ariete. China is to get the necessary funds from Fenner's account at her bank. Fenner rages about his failure, and the disgrace of returning to the people who funded his trip with small donations, after he had fled as a boy with his father. China declares her love for him.

China obtains the funds but sends a fellow employee with them because she is being tailed by one of Ariete's men. Fenner, unwilling to leave without her, comes to China's house, and they have a gun battle with the police. China takes up a submachine gun and gives cover as Fenner lobs sticks of dynamite. He is mortally wounded but hears the bells ringing for the outbreak of revolution and popular celebration.

== Cast ==
- Jennifer Jones as China Valdés
- John Garfield as Tony Fenner
- Pedro Armendáriz as Armando Ariete
- Gilbert Roland as Guillermo Montilla
- Ramon Novarro as Chief
- Wally Cassell as Miguel
- Tito Renaldo as Manolo Valdés
- David Bond as Ramón Sánchez
- José Pérez as Toto
- Morris Ankrum as Mr. Seymour
- Roberta Haynes as Lolita Valdés

== Production ==
The story, as originally told as a segment entitled "China Valdez" in Robert Sylvester's novel Rough Sketch, draws on events that occurred as part of the political violence that led to the overthrow of Cuban dictator Gerardo Machado y Morales in 1933. In 1932, a violent opposition group, the ABC (abecedarios), assassinated the President of the Cuban Senate Clemente Vázquez Bello. They had previously constructed a tunnel into the Vázquez family crypt in Havana's Colón Cemetery and planted an explosive device there, anticipating that Machado would attend the funeral. The plan failed when the family decided to bury Vázquez elsewhere.

=== Pre-production ===
John Huston, recognizing the sensitive nature of the film's politics, formed an independent production company, Horizon Films, to finance the film. One critic wrote that the film was "a barely disguised indictment of U.S. foreign policy" as well as a study of "the poetry of failure" typical of Huston's style. Huston cast John Garfield partly because they shared the same political outlook.

Most of the film was shot at the Columbia Pictures studio in Los Angeles, with additional second unit work done in Havana. The second unit footage employed locally hired doubles for Jennifer Jones and other cast members.

Much of the script was written as filming progressed. According to Peter Viertel, "Huston was going through a lot of personal problems at the time, and he was unable to concentrate on the film" even though it presented serious challenges: "It was a very difficult story with an ending that wasn't exactly considered happy by Hollywood standards." The ending was repeatedly rewritten by a variety of writers, with the final version by Ben Hecht. The title, chosen by the distributor Columbia Pictures in place of Rough Sketch, refers to how the revolutionaries come together with no prior associations, sharing only their political principles.

The supporting players include Mexican film star Pedro Armendáriz as the corrupt police chief Armando Ariete, and former silent stars Gilbert Roland and Ramon Novarro as members of the resistance Guillermo Montilla and Chief. John Huston makes a cameo appearance as a bank teller. Many of the film's outdoor scenes were shot against rear projections, which are quite noticeable, including views of Havana Harbor, Havana University, Morro Castle, and Colon Cemetery. The film, however, achieves an almost documentary-like feel with its stark black-and-white photography. The film was evidently unavailable for viewing until it was made available for domestic video sale in 2005, long after Huston's other films became available.

During filming, Huston was asked to give Marilyn Monroe, then unknown, a screen test. As a result, he cast her in a small role in his next film, The Asphalt Jungle.

== Reception ==
Huston directed the film between two box office successes: The Treasure of Sierra Madre (1948) and The Asphalt Jungle (1950). We Were Strangers was released in April 1949 and received mixed reviews. In The New York Times, Bosley Crowther praised the physical and psychological realism of the conspirators, but he disliked Jennifer Jones' performance and missed a central romance: "the real emotional tinder which is scattered within this episode is never swept into a pyramid and touched off with a quick, explosive spark". Reviews in Time and Collier's were more positive, but The Hollywood Reporter denounced its politics: "a shameful handbook of Marxian dialectics ... the heaviest dish of Red theory ever served to an audience outside the Soviet". The film was withdrawn from theaters shortly after its release. The Communist Party's Daily Worker accused the film of being "capitalist propaganda."

Variety listed the film as a box office disappointment.

American audiences were perplexed by it, its largely Hispanic cast did not resonate with white Americans, and its shocking presidential assassination theme may have offended some sensibilities.

On the review aggregator website Rotten Tomatoes, 73% of 11 critics' reviews are positive.

=== Claimed effect on Lee Harvey Oswald ===
According to Priscilla Johnson McMillan's biography of Lee Harvey Oswald and his wife, Marina, Oswald was "greatly excited" while watching We Were Strangers on television in October 1963, just a few weeks before he assassinated President John F. Kennedy.
