= The Deadly Years =

- Star Trek: The Original Series episode
- Episode no.: Season 2 Episode 12
- Directed by: Joseph Pevney
- Written by: David P. Harmon
- Cinematography by: Jerry Finnerman
- Production code: 040
- Original air date: December 8, 1967

Guest appearances
- Charles Drake – Commodore Stocker; Carolyn Nelson – Yeoman Atkins; Sarah Marshall – Dr. Janet Wallace; Laura Wood – Elaine Johnson; Felix Locher – Robert Johnson; Beverly Washburn – Lt. Arlene Galway; Roger Holloway – Lt. Lemli; Eddie Paskey – Lt. Leslie; Frank Da Vinci – Lt. Brent

Episode chronology
← Previous "Friday's Child"	Next → "Obsession"
- Star Trek: The Original Series season 2

"The Deadly Years" is the twelfth episode of the second season of the American science fiction television series Star Trek. Written by David P. Harmon and directed by Joseph Pevney, it was first broadcast December 8, 1967.

In the episode, strange radiation causes members of the crew of the Enterprise to age rapidly.

== Plot ==
The USS Enterprise is ferrying a senior officer, Commodore Stocker, to Starbase 10 where he is due to assume command. On the way, the ship makes a stop at planet Gamma Hydra IV to resupply the research station there. A landing party consisting of Captain Kirk, First Officer Spock, Chief Medical Officer Dr. McCoy, Chief Engineer Scott, navigator Ensign Chekov, and Lieutenant Arlene Galway beam down to the facility. The station seems completely deserted, until Ensign Chekov discovers the body of a man who apparently has died of old age, and panics. Robert Johnson, a member of the station crew, appears with his wife Elaine. Both claim to be in their late 20s, yet appear 50 years older. They soon die in the Enterprise sickbay.

Mr. Spock and civilian scientist Dr. Janet Wallace begin an investigation. Their only clue is a comet that passed Gamma Hydra IV recently. Soon the landing party, with the exception of Chekov, begin to age rapidly as well. Lt. Galway ages most rapidly and soon dies. By now they have learned that the comet gave off low-level radiation that most likely caused the aging effect.

As Kirk continues to age, he becomes increasingly forgetful, including ordering the use of an obsolete code despite having recently been told the code had been broken by the Romulans. This leads Commodore Stocker to order Spock to convene a hearing, in which Kirk is found unfit to command. With Spock also afflicted, Stocker assumes command, and orders a direct course to Starbase 10, ignoring warnings that this will take the ship through the Romulan neutral zone.

Meanwhile, Kirk, McCoy, and Spock discuss Chekov's immunity to the affliction. Remembering Chekov's fright at the discovery of the dead body, McCoy surmises that Chekov's increased adrenaline levels may have had some effect, and recalls that adrenaline had once shown promise as a treatment for radiation sickness. Mr. Spock and Dr. Wallace, assisted by Nurse Chapel, begin work on an adrenaline-based compound to test on the landing party.

As Enterprise enters the neutral zone, Romulan vessels attack, ignoring all attempts at contact. Stocker, having no field command experience and paralyzed with indecision, considers surrendering, but is reminded that Romulans do not take prisoners. In sickbay, Spock announces that the drug is ready, warning that it may kill as well as cure. Kirk insists on taking the first injection. The drug reverses the aging effect, and Kirk races to the bridge to relieve Stocker.

Kirk bluffs the Romulans by sending a message to Starfleet Command, deliberately using the broken code, warning that Enterprise will self-destruct using the "corbomite device", which will also destroy any nearby ships. The Romulans move to a safe distance, giving Enterprise room to make a surprise escape.

== Production and reception ==
DeForest Kelley (Dr. McCoy) said of the make-up used in this episode, "I only worked half days on that show because I was in makeup the other half. I'd sit in the chair for a while, then I'd take a break, go to the john, come back and they'd work some more. It was a tremendous makeup effort. There were three makeup men working on me all the time, on my hands and on my face. Leonard [Nimoy] was lucky on that show. He was blessed by the fact that Vulcans don't age as fast as humans."

Critic Darren Mooney notes that the aging in the episode focuses on the negative, physical process, and none of the grace and enjoyment of life's accomplishments. Part of this focus on the physical aspects of aging came from associate producer Robert Justman's notes to producer Gene Coon where he details the steps of Kirk's aging.

Zack Handlen of The A.V. Club gave the episode a "B−" rating, noting the focus on the physical aspects of aging, saying, "Nobody learns a valuable lesson about how getting old is just a natural part of life."

== Sequel ==
An episode of the Star Trek: New Voyages series, created by fans of the series, called "To Serve All My Days" is a sequel to this episode. The screenplay was written by D. C. Fontana and stars Walter Koenig as a rapidly aging Chekov.
