= Sarah Marshall (British actress) =

British actress (1933–2014)

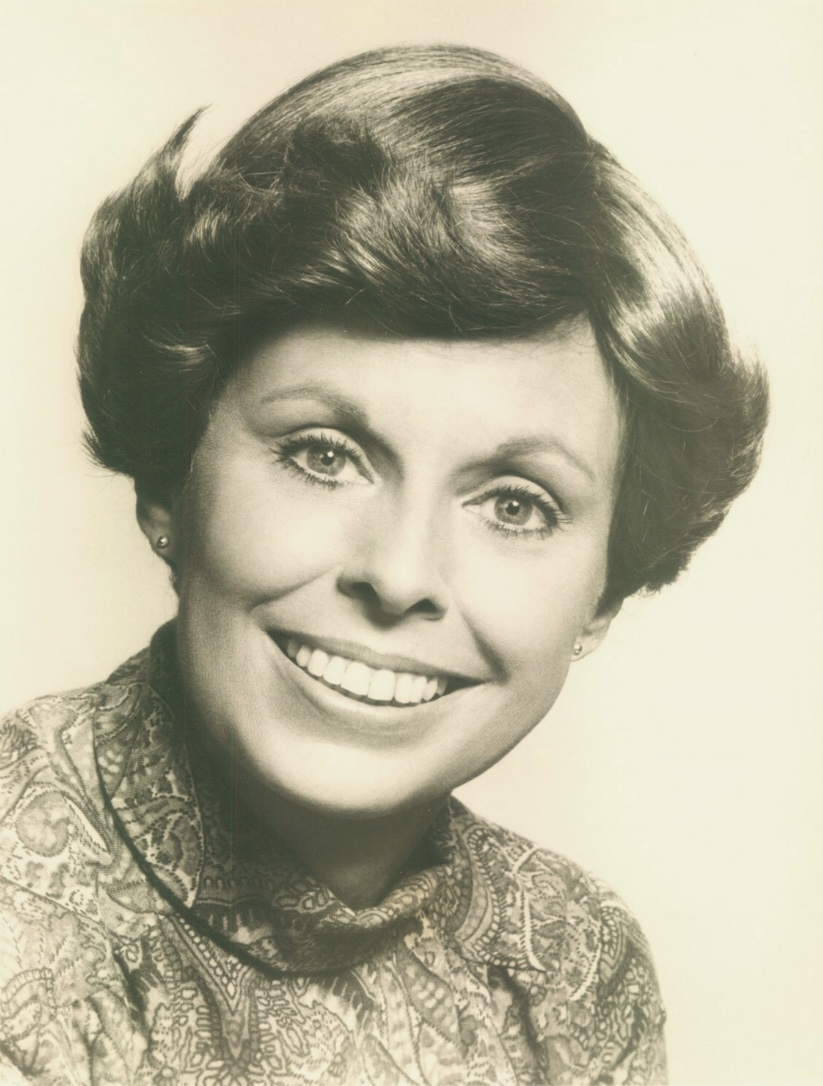
- Marshall in 1979
- Born: Sarah Lynne Marshall; 25 May 1933; London, England
- Died: 18 January 2014 (aged 80); Los Angeles, California, U.S.
- Occupation: Actress
- Years active: 1951–2012
- Spouses: Mel Bourne (m. 1952; div. 1957) Carl Held (m. 1964)
- Children: 1
- Parent(s): Herbert Marshall; Edna Best

Sarah Lynne Marshall (25 May 1933 – 18 January 2014) was a British actress. She received a nomination for the Tony Award for Best Featured Actress in a Play for her performance in Goodbye Charlie.

== Early life ==
Marshall was born in London, to actors Edna Best and Herbert Marshall. After her parents divorced, Marshall and her mother moved to Los Angeles.

== Career ==
Marshall made her Broadway debut in 1951 as an usher in a short revival of Elmer Rice's Dream Girl. Her next performances were in three revivals of Robert E. Sherwood plays and a new S.N. Behrman play opposite her mother, all to small audiences. Marshall won a Theatre World Award in 1956 for her role as Bonnie Dee Ponder in the adaptation of Eudora Welty's The Ponder Heart. She was nominated for the Tony Award in 1960 for her role in George Axelrod's play Goodbye Charlie.

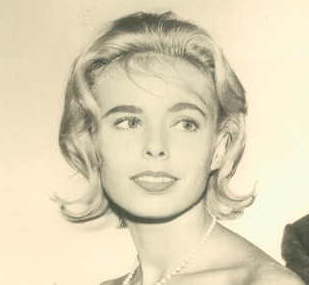
Marshall in 1961

Marshall also had a starring role in Alfred Hitchcock Presents as Poopsie (Mrs. Barrett) in "The Baby Blue Expression". Throughout the 1960s, she appeared in a variety of other television series, including The Twilight Zone (episode "Little Girl Lost" in 1962, in which she played Ruth, the mother of Tina), The Tab Hunter Show, Thriller, Kentucky Jones, F Troop, Perry Mason, Get Smart, Star Trek (episode "The Deadly Years" in 1967), and in one 1966 episode (Doggone Martian) of My Favorite Martian She guest-starred in three episodes of Daniel Boone: "Cry of Gold" (1965), "Take the Southbound Stage" (1967) and "Hero's Welcome" (1968). She played the murderous Eugenia Rawlins in The Wild Wild West S3 E7 "The Night of the Hangman" (1967).

From the 1970s until shortly before her death, Marshall appeared in numerous television series and in several films. On television, her only full-time regular series role was on the sitcom Miss Winslow & Son in 1979, in which she played Evelyn Winslow, the mother of the series' main character Susan Winslow. Her final film performance was that of Mrs. Weston in Bad Blood (also known as Bad Blood...The Hunger), released in 2012.

== Personal life ==
On 13 June 1952, Marshall married production designer Mel Bourne. They had one child, a son, before divorcing in 1957. In 1964, she married actor Carl Held. They remained together until her death.

== Death ==
Marshall died on 18 January 2014, after a lengthy battle with stomach cancer. She was 80 years old.

== Partial filmography ==
Year	Title	Role	Notes
1958	The Long, Hot Summer	Agnes Stewart	
1960	Alfred Hitchcock Presents	Mrs. Barrett	Season 6 Episode 12: "The Baby-Blue Expression"
1961	Perry Mason	Judy Bryant	Season 5 Episode 15: "The Case of the Roving River"
1962	Alfred Hitchcock Presents	Miss Pomfritt	Season 7 Episode 34: "The Twelve Hour Caper"
1962	The Twilight Zone	Ruth Miller	Season 3 Episode 26: "Little Girl Lost"
1963	The Alfred Hitchcock Hour	Louise Trevor	Season 1 Episode 21: "I'll Be Judge- I'll Be Jury"
1964	Wild and Wonderful	Pamela	
1965	A Rage to Live	Connie	
1966	Lord Love a Duck	Miss Schwartz	
1967	Star Trek	Dr. Janet Wallace	Season 2 Episode 12: "The Deadly Years"
1972	Embassy	Miss Harding	
1983	Hart to Hart	Mrs. Wentworth-Hays	
1993	Dave	Diane	
1995	Dangerous Minds	Librarian #2	
2012	Bad Blood	Mrs. Weston	(final film role)
