= Philip Marlowe (TV series) =

American TV crime series (1959–1960)

- Created by: Raymond Chandler
- Starring: Philip Carey
- Country of origin: United States
- No. of seasons: 1
- No. of episodes: 26

Production
- Running time: 30 minutes per episode
- Production companies: Mark Goodson-Bill Todman Productions in association with California National Productions

Original release
- Network: ABC
- Release: October 6, 1959 – March 26, 1960

Philip Marlowe is an ABC crime series, featuring Philip Carey as Marlowe, the fictional private detective created by Raymond Chandler. It was broadcast from October 6, 1959, until March 29, 1960.

== Premise ==
Like the Marlowe in Chandler's novels, the detective worked alone in the TV show, but he "had become a much more gentlemanly sort than on the printed page." He avoided personal involvement while he sought "to protect people, solve crimes, and track down missing persons." In at least one episode, "Murder is a Grave Affair", Marlowe says he was an "ex-cop", a departure from Chandler where his working background was the district attorney's office.

Episodes of the series contained no surprise endings. As each episode progressed, viewers had the same information that Marlowe had, enabling them to try to solve the crime along with him.

== Cast ==
- Philip Carey as Philip Marlowe
- William Schallert as Lt. Manny Harris
- Ed Kemmer as Ralph Craig

== Episodes ==
No.	Title	Directed by	Written by	Original release date
1	"The Ugly Duckling"	Robert Ellis Miller	Gene Wang	October 6, 1959
2	"Prescription for Murder"	Unknown	Unknown	October 13, 1959
3	"Buddy Boy"	Unknown	Unknown	October 20, 1959
4	"Death in the Family"	Unknown	Unknown	October 27, 1959
5	"Mama's Boy"	Unknown	Unknown	November 3, 1959
6	"Child of Virtue"	Unknown	Unknown	November 10, 1959
7	"Bum Wrap"	Unknown	Unknown	November 17, 1959
8	"The Temple of Love"	Unknown	Unknown	November 24, 1959
9	"The Mogul"	Unknown	Unknown	December 1, 1959
10	"Hit & Run"	Unknown	Unknown	December 8, 1959
11	"Mother Dear"	Unknown	Unknown	December 15, 1959
12	"The Hunger"	Unknown	Unknown	December 22, 1959
13	"Ricochet"	Unknown	Unknown	December 29, 1959
14	"The Scarlet A"	Unknown	Unknown	January 5, 1960
15	"A Standard for Murder"	Edward Dein	Barry Trivers	January 12, 1960
16	"Poor Lilli, Sweet Lilli"	Unknown	Unknown	January 19, 1960
17	"Death Takes a Lover"	Unknown	Unknown	January 26, 1960
18	"One Ring for Murder"	Unknown	Unknown	February 2, 1960
19	"Gem of a Murder"	Unknown	Unknown	February 9, 1960
20	"Time to Kill"	Unknown	Unknown	February 16, 1960
21	"Murder in the Stars"	Unknown	Unknown	February 23, 1960
22	"Murder by the Book"	Unknown	Unknown	March 1, 1960
23	"Murder is a Grave Affair"	Paul Stewart	Gene Wang	March 8, 1960
24	"Murder is Dead Wrong"	Unknown	Unknown	March 15, 1960
25	"Last Call for Murder"	Unknown	Unknown	March 22, 1960
26	"You Kill Me"	Unknown	Unknown	March 29, 1960

== Production ==
NBC-TV financed the original pilot for a Marlowe series starring Carey, but it sold the program and Carey to ABC, which revamped it. Mark Goodson and Bill Todman produced the series. The directors were Irvin Kershner, Robert Ellis Miller, and Paul Stewart. The writers were Charles Beaumont and Gene Wang.

The program's lack of success was attributed to its similarity to other contemporary detective series. Sponsors were Brown & Williamson and American Home Products. The series had 26 episodes. It was broadcast from 9:30 to 10 p.m. Eastern Time on Tuesdays. Its competition included The Red Skelton Show on CBS. NBC initially had Startime, which was succeeded by The Arthur Murray Party.
