= Hell Ship Mutiny =

1957 film by Elmo Williams, Lee Sholem

- Original film poster
- Directed by: Lee Sholem; Elmo Williams
- Written by: DeVallon Scott; Wells Root
- Produced by: George Bilson; Jon Hall
- Starring: Jon Hall; John Carradine; Peter Lorre; Roberta Haynes; Mike Mazurki
- Cinematography: Sam Leavitt
- Edited by: Elmo Williams
- Music by: Paul Sawtell; Bert Shefter
- Production company: Lovina Productions
- Distributed by: Republic Pictures
- Release date: 6 December 1957 (United States)
- Running time: 66 minutes
- Country: United States
- Language: English

Hell Ship Mutiny is a 1957 American South Seas adventure film directed by Lee Sholem and Elmo Williams starring Jon Hall who also produced and narrated the film. It is a compilation of a 1955 unsold television pilot Knight of the South Seas. Hall's father Felix Locher plays the role of a native chief.

This film is now in the public domain.

== Plot ==
Captain Jim Knight, and his crew Roxy, Tula, and a chimp named Salty sail the South Seas in search of adventure. They discover a criminal gang has taken over a small island, forcing the native pearl divers to dive beyond safe limits.

After capturing the three-man gang, Knight takes them to Tahiti for trial where the men escape and force Knight to sail them to New Zealand. Knight subdues them again but this time a minor French magistrate is sent to the island to try them there. The magistrate joins the criminals when a native boy locates the wreck of a lost ship containing a Burmese king's treasure.

== Cast ==
- Jon Hall as Capt. Jim Knight
- John Carradine as Malone
- Peter Lorre as Commissioner Lamoret
- Roberta Haynes as Princess Mareva
- Mike Mazurki as Ross, chief henchman
- Charles Mauu as Tula, sailor
- Stanley Adams as Roxy, first mate
- Danny Richards Jr. as Tatoa, native boy
- Felix Locher as King Parea
- Peter Coe as Prince Terahi
- Michael Barrett as Pinky, Malone Henchman
- Salvador Baguez as Kuala
- Salty the Chimp as Salty

== Production ==
In October 1955 Jon Hall, who had just finished starring in Ramar of the Jungle, announced he would play a sea captain in a new TV series Knight of the South Seas. It would be made by his own production company, Lovina. In December Hedda Hopper reported that Hall had already shot footage in the south seas and signed his first co-star, John Carradine.

Filming started 15 December 1955 at Fox Western Avenue studios. Two episodes were filmed.

In May 1956 Hall announced the series would premiere in Tahiti, where Hall grew up.

The pilot was not picked up so Hall combined the episodes for a feature film.

== Reception ==
The Monthly Film Bulletin said "apart from the fights and good underwater shots this juvenile adventure film sadly lacks vitality."

== See also ==
- Public domain film
- List of American films of 1957
- List of films in the public domain in the United States
