= Until They Sail =

1957 film by Robert Wise

- Original poster
- Directed by: Robert Wise
- Screenplay by: Robert Anderson
- Based on: Until They Sail; Return to Paradise; 1950 story by James A. Michener
- Produced by: Charles Schnee
- Starring: Jean Simmons; Joan Fontaine; Paul Newman; Piper Laurie; Sandra Dee
- Cinematography: Joseph Ruttenberg
- Edited by: Harold F. Kress
- Music by: David Raksin
- Distributed by: Metro-Goldwyn-Mayer
- Release date: October 8, 1957
- Running time: 94 minutes
- Country: United States
- Language: English
- Budget: $1,841,000
- Box office: $1,420,000

Until They Sail is a 1957 American black-and-white CinemaScope drama film directed by Robert Wise and starring Jean Simmons, Joan Fontaine, Paul Newman, Piper Laurie and Sandra Dee. The screenplay by Robert Anderson, based on a story by James A. Michener included in his 1951 anthology Return to Paradise, focuses on four New Zealand sisters and their relationships with U.S. Marines during World War II.

== Plot ==
The film opens in a Christchurch courtroom, where testimony prompts Barbara Leslie to flashback to the events that led to the trial. She and her sisters Anne, Evelyn, and Delia live in Christchurch, where most of the male residents, including their brother Kit and Barbara's new husband Mark, are preparing to leave for World War II duty. Delia announces her engagement to Phil "Shiner" Friskett, who is one of the city's few remaining bachelors, but word of Kit's death dampens the celebration. Repressed and judgmental spinster sister Anne disapproves of the upcoming nuptials, but Barbara defends Delia's decision.

Within weeks of the marriage, the sisters come to resent Shiner's abuse and are happy to see him leave for active duty. Delia moves to Wellington to work for the New Zealand Navy. When several hundred U.S. Marines are shipped to Christchurch following the 1941 attack on Pearl Harbor, the lonely local women are flattered by the attention they pay them. When Evelyn invites Capt. Richard "Dick" Bates to dinner, he declines the offer, but not without attracting Anne's eye.

Concerned about Delia, Anne sends Barbara to Wellington, where she discovers her sister is registered at the St. George Hotel under her maiden name. Shiner is now a prisoner of war, and Delia has become involved with an American lieutenant named Andy. She plans to divorce Shiner and emigrate to the United States. Andy introduces Barbara to his friend Jack Harding, a Marine reviewing the backgrounds of prospective New Zealand brides of American soldiers. Although Barbara intends to remain faithful to her husband, she finds herself attracted to Jack.

Back in Christchurch, Anne is outraged by the lewd comments made by American servicemen in the lingerie shop where she works and writes a letter of complaint to the local paper. Following its publication, Dick is sent to the Leslie home to deliver a formal apology on behalf of the Marine Corps. Anne invites him to dinner, and Dick arrives with a gift of perfume for each sister. Anne accuses him of trying to seduce them.

Soon after, Barbara and Anne learn of Mark's death in North Africa and Dick's departure for active duty. He eventually returns to New Zealand to recuperate from an injury, and a romance between him and Anne blossoms. He proposes, but before the required marital investigation can take place, he is given offshore duty, leaving Anne expecting their child and unsure of what the future holds for them.

Jack arrives at the Leslie home to conduct his investigation of Anne, and he advises her that wartime romances stem from loneliness rather than love. Barbara tells him his assessment is heartless. Shortly after, she discovers Dick's name on the latest casualty list. Weeks later, Jack runs into Barbara at a local dance, where she suggests he uses alcohol to avoid intimacy. He breaks down in her arms, and a strong friendship between the two blossoms.

Jack celebrates Christmas Eve with the Leslie family, which now includes Anne's newborn son. When he announces his imminent departure, he and Barbara share an amorous embrace. Months later, Evelyn's sweetheart Tommy returns from war and proposes to her. Barbara sees an item from Richard's mother in the personals section of the newspaper, containing a request from Dick's mother to hear from any New Zealand family who knew her son. After Barbara writes to her, Dick's mother sends money to finance Anne and her baby's move to Oklahoma to live with their family.

The day of Anne's departure coincides with the Japanese announcing the end of hostilities. Delia has arrived in Wellington to see Anne off and to ask Shiner, recently rescued from a P.O.W. camp, for a divorce so she can leave for America with her latest lover. Infuriated, Shiner kills his wife with a Japanese sword he brought back from the war.

Weeks later, during the murder trial, Jack is forced to reveal his investigation report detailing Delia's seven affairs with American soldiers. Upset that her sister's infidelities seemingly have justified her savage murder, Barbara refuses Jack's invitation to leave New Zealand with him. Upon reflection, she packs her belongings and arrives at Jack's hotel to tell him she's ready to embark upon a new life with him.

== Cast ==
- Jean Simmons as Barbara Leslie Forbes
- Joan Fontaine as Anne Leslie
- Paul Newman as Capt. Jack Harding
- Piper Laurie as Delia Leslie Friskett
- Charles Drake as Capt. Richard Bates
- Sandra Dee as Evelyn Leslie
- Wally Cassell as Phil "Shiner" Friskett
- Alan Napier as Prosecution Attorney
- Ralph Votrian as Max Murphy
- John Wilder as Tommy
- Tige Andrews as US Marine #1 (store customer)
- Adam Kennedy as Lt. Andy
- Mickey Shaughnessy as US Marine #2 (store customer)

== Music ==
The score for the film was composed and conducted by David Raksin. The title song included lyrics by Sammy Cahn and was performed under the main titles by vocalist Eydie Gorme.

The complete score was issued on CD in 2009, on Film Score Monthly records.

== Production ==
Robert Wise and Mark Robson had originally purchased the rights for Michener's story when they were at RKO. Casting problems forced them to delay the filming when the rights went to Hecht-Hill-Lancaster Productions who were going to cast Burt Lancaster. When the company made The Kentuckian instead, MGM acquired the rights, first intending their contract lead Glenn Ford playing the lead Marine. Robert Wise then reacquired the film through MGM in his last film of his contract with the studio.

Wise visited New Zealand to familiarise himself with the nation and the people. Location filming took place in Christchurch and Wellington in February 1957, but most of the movie was shot on the MGM back lot. Wise originally intended to shoot the film in colour.

It was Sandra Dee's first film. (The 1957 Soviet animated feature The Snow Queen is often listed as Dee's first film credit, because she and other Hollywood stars did the voices for the English-language version, but that English-language audio was not actually made until 1959.)

Stewart Granger was once announced for the lead.

== Box office ==
According to MGM records, the film earned $745,000 in the US and Canada and $675,000 elsewhere, resulting in a loss of $1,055,000.

== Critical reception ==
Bosley Crowther of The New York Times observed, "The genuine tugs at the heart are few and far between in this bittersweet but basically restrained chronicle. Robert Anderson's adaptation . . . is honest and straightforward . . . Unfortunately there is a good deal of introspective soul-searching before this narrative arrives at its sad and happy endings."

William K. Zinsser of the New York Herald Tribune wrote that the film "has moments of genuine tenderness and truth."

== See also ==
- List of American films of 1957
- List of films set in New Zealand
