= Felix Locher =

Swiss actor (1882–1969)

- Publicity Photo of Felix Locher
- Born: July 16, 1882
- Died: March 13, 1969 (aged 86)

Felix Maurice Locher (pronounced Lo-Shay) (July 16, 1882, Bern, Switzerland – March 13, 1969, California) was a Swiss actor and inventor and father of actor Jon Hall.

== Career ==
Felix Locher was an inventor who held over 100 copyrights and patents relating to a mapping system that he used when lecturing to insurance salesmen. Locher started acting late in life: when he began his career in 1955 (performing in an unsold TV show which became the 1957 film Hell Ship Mutiny) he was 73 years old. The father of actor Jon Hall (born Charles Felix Locher), he visited his son on the set when he was discovered by director Elmo Williams who convinced him to play the part of an elderly Tahitian Chief. From then on he appeared in numerous television productions throughout the 1950s and 1960s until his death in 1969 at age of 86.

He also appeared in Star Trek ("The Deadly Years," season 2), The Munsters – Season 2, Episode 18 "Heap Big Herman" (1966), Combat! episode "The Mockingbird" Season 4 as Brother Jasper (1965) ,Gunsmoke (1968) The Man from U.N.C.L.E., House of the Damned (1963), Mission: Impossible (1967) with Joseph Campanella, The Twilight Zone: The Silence (TV), Thunder in the Sun, and Curse of the Faceless Man (1958). He is considered the oldest Star Trek actor of all time by birth year (the second-oldest is Leonard Mudie, born 1883).

He was buried at the Forest Lawn, Hollywood Hills Cemetery in Los Angeles.

== Filmography ==
| Year | Title | Role | Notes |
|---|---|---|---|
| 1957 | Hell Ship Mutiny | King Parea | |
| 1958 | Desert Hell | Marsaya, scout | |
| 1958 | Curse of the Faceless Man | Dr. Emanuel | |
| 1958 | Frankenstein's Daughter | Prof. Carter Morton | |
| 1959 | Thunder in the Sun | Danielle | |
| 1960 | Walk Tall | Chief Black Feather | |
| 1962 | The Firebrand | Ramirez | |
| 1963 | California | Don Pablo Hernandez | |
| 1963 | House of the Damned | Corpse | Uncredited |
| 1965 | The Greatest Story Ever Told | Elderly Man Who Touches Jesus | Uncredited |
| 1966 | Made in Paris | Leon | Uncredited |
