= Gun Fury =

1953 Western film by Raoul Walsh

- Theatrical Poster
- Directed by: Raoul Walsh
- Screenplay by: Irving Wallace; Roy Huggins
- Based on: Ten against Caesar; 1952 novel by K.R.G. Granger
- Produced by: Lewis J. Rachmil
- Starring: Rock Hudson; Donna Reed; Philip Carey; Roberta Haynes
- Cinematography: Lester White
- Edited by: Jerome Thoms; James Sweeney
- Music by: Mischa Bakaleinikoff; Arthur Morton
- Color process: Technicolor
- Production company: Columbia Pictures
- Distributed by: Columbia Pictures
- Release date: November 11, 1953
- Running time: 82 minutes
- Country: United States
- Language: English

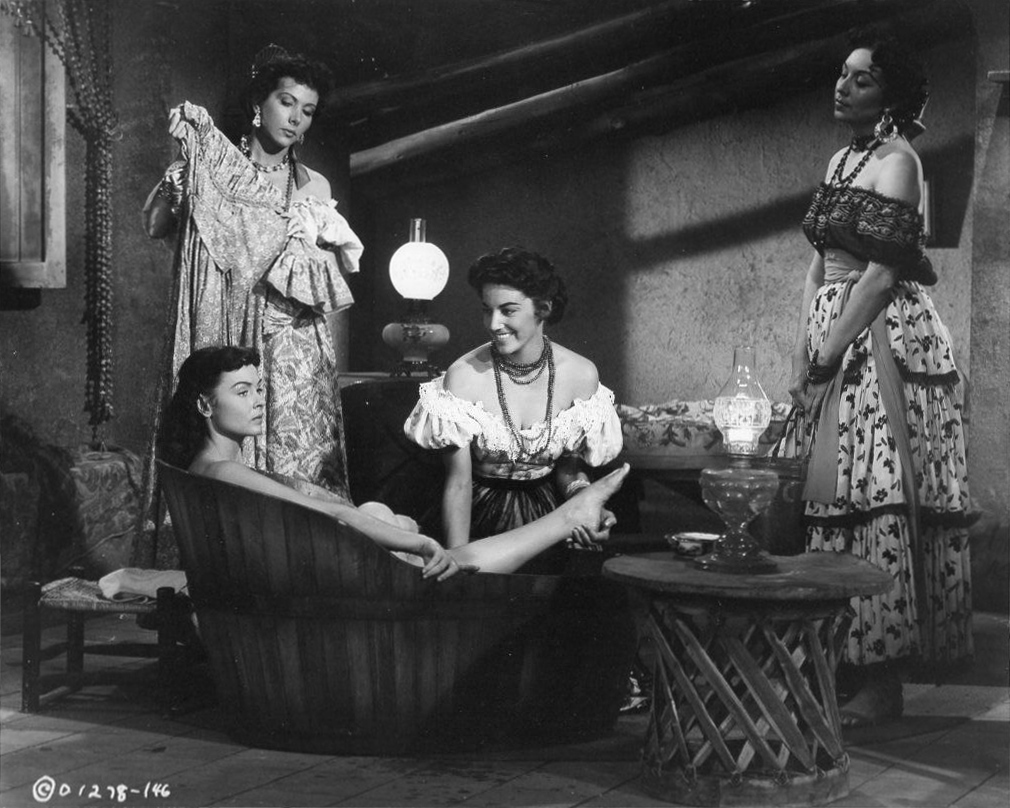
Donna Reed and Alma Beltran

Gun Fury is a 1953 3-D American Western film, directed by Raoul Walsh and starring Rock Hudson and Donna Reed, with major supporting roles for Philip Carey and Leo Gordon. The supporting cast includes Lee Marvin and Neville Brand. The film is based on the novel Ten Against Caesar by Kathleen B. George and Robert A. Granger.

== Plot ==
After a stagecoach holdup, Frank Slayton's notorious outlaw gang leave Ben Warren for dead and head off with his fiancée. Warren follows, and although none of the townspeople he comes across are prepared to help, he manages to recruit two men who have sworn revenge on the ruthless Slayton.

One is Jess Burgess, gang member who had objected to the kidnapping and was abandoned to die in the desert. The other is Johash, an Indian with an equally personal grudge---his sister was abducted and murdered by Slayton under identical circumstances.

As the pursuit continues, "Southern Gentleman" Slayton kills three members of his gang for real and/or imagined offenses.

Just short of the Mexican border, his gang is forced to take shelter in a ghost town. Johash's deadly skill with a sniper rifle cuts off the gang's escape route, as three more gang members fatally discover.

Warren places the only available water in an open space and challenges Slayton to come and get it. Slayton is out of ammunition, and Warren eventually wins a lengthy fistfight that begins at the top of a steep hill and slowly and dangerously progresses to ground level.

Warren's experiences during the American Civil War had made him basically a pacifist. But thanks to Johash, he is able to keep his own hands basically clean; and he and fiancé Jennifer Ballard are re-united.

== Production ==
The film was shot in the Red Rocks area near Sedona, Arizona, with the striking features of Cathedral Rock as the backdrop in a number of scenes.

The film was shot in 3D, and features several shots of objects being thrown directly at the camera, to create an exciting visual effect.

== Cast ==
- Rock Hudson as Ben Warren
- Donna Reed as Jennifer Ballard
- Philip Carey as Frank Slayton
- Roberta Haynes as Estella Morales
- Leo Gordon as Jess Burgess
- Lee Marvin as Blinky
- Neville Brand as Brazos
- Ray Thomas as Doc
- Bob Herron as Curly Jordan (as Robert Herron)
- Phil Rawlins as Jim Morse
- Forrest Lewis as Weatherby
- Pat Hogan as Johash
