= Mel Bourne =

Production designer

- Born: Melvin B. Bornstein; November 22, 1923; Chicago, Illinois
- Died: January 14, 2003 (aged 79); New York City, New York
- Occupations: Production designer Art director
- Years active: 1950–2000
- Spouse: Sarah Marshall (m. 1952; div. 1957)
- Children: 1

Mel Bourne (November 22, 1923 – January 14, 2003) was an American production designer and art director. He was nominated for three Academy Awards in the category Best Art Direction. He was born Melvin B. Bornstein in Chicago, Illinois, the son of Frieda and Max Bornstein.

== Family ==
Bourne married actress Sarah Marshall June 13, 1952. They had one child, Timothy Bourne, and they divorced in 1957.

== Selected filmography ==
Bourne was nominated for three Academy Awards for Best Art Direction:

- Interiors (1978)
- The Natural (1984)
- The Fisher King (1991)
