= Hotel St George, Wellington =

Building in Wellington, New Zealand

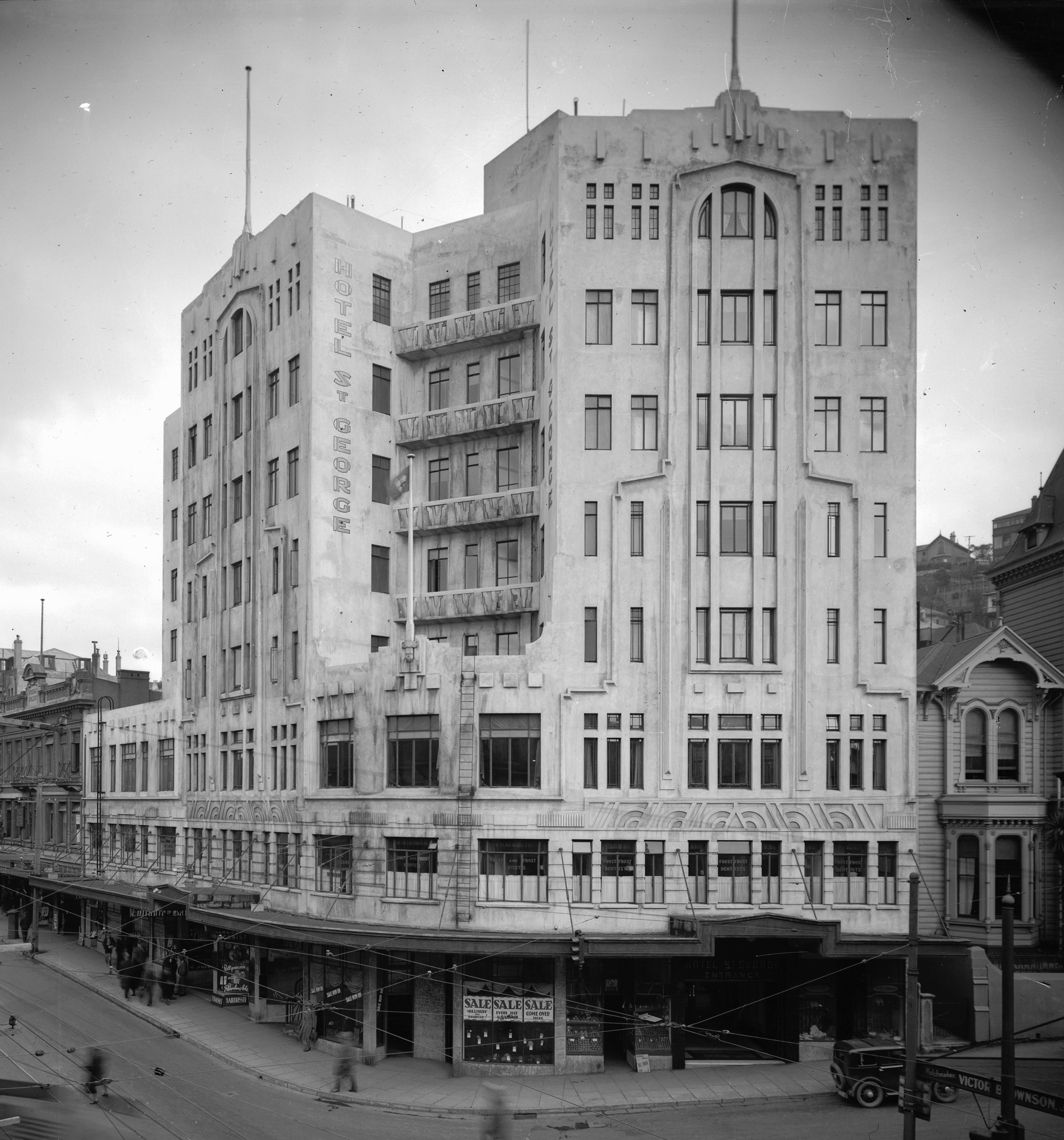
Hotel St George, corner of Willis Street (at left) and Boulcott Street, 1930s.

The Hotel St. George was once one of Wellington, New Zealand's top hotels. It is a significant building on a prominent corner site, and notable for being the hotel where the Beatles stayed during a tour of New Zealand.

== Overview ==
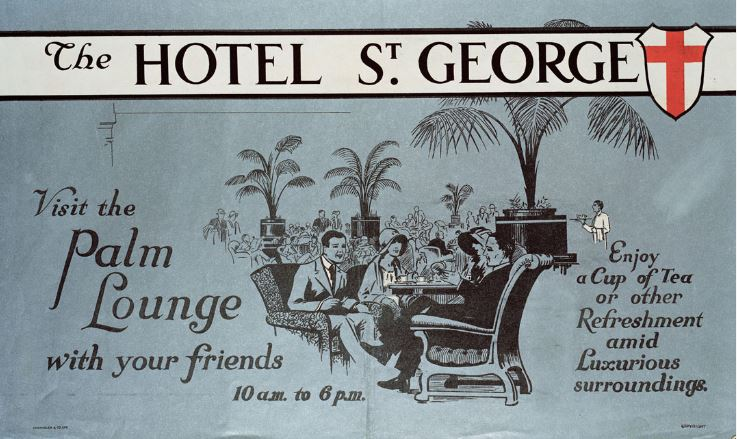
Advertisement for the Palm Lounge, ca 1930s.

The hotel was built on a site that had previously been taken by the Union Bank, whose building was converted about 1877 into the Albert Hotel (nicknamed the "Old Identities") by early Wellington settler John Plimmer.

The hotel was designed by architect William Prouse in the Art Deco style and built in 1929-30 of steel-framed reinforced concrete at a cost of almost £100,000. The hotel was originally to be called the Majestic Hotel, as Prouse had also designed the nearby Majestic Theatre and the two buildings had features in common, but the name was changed during the construction period. During excavation for the foundations it was discovered that the site contained substantial deposits of blue clay, so the builders had to put in deep concrete piles to ensure stability. Hotel St George opened on 1 December 1930. The hotel's main entrance was on Boulcott Street but the bars could be accessed directly from an entrance on Willis Street. Originally the hotel had over 100 guest bedrooms, including some suites, and 30 staff bedrooms, with each guest bedroom having its own bathroom and telephone. The bedrooms were in two identical eight-storey wings facing Boulcott and Willis Streets, while the central area housed lounges and public areas. The dining room could seat over 200 people, and the Palm Lounge was available for afternoon teas and functions.

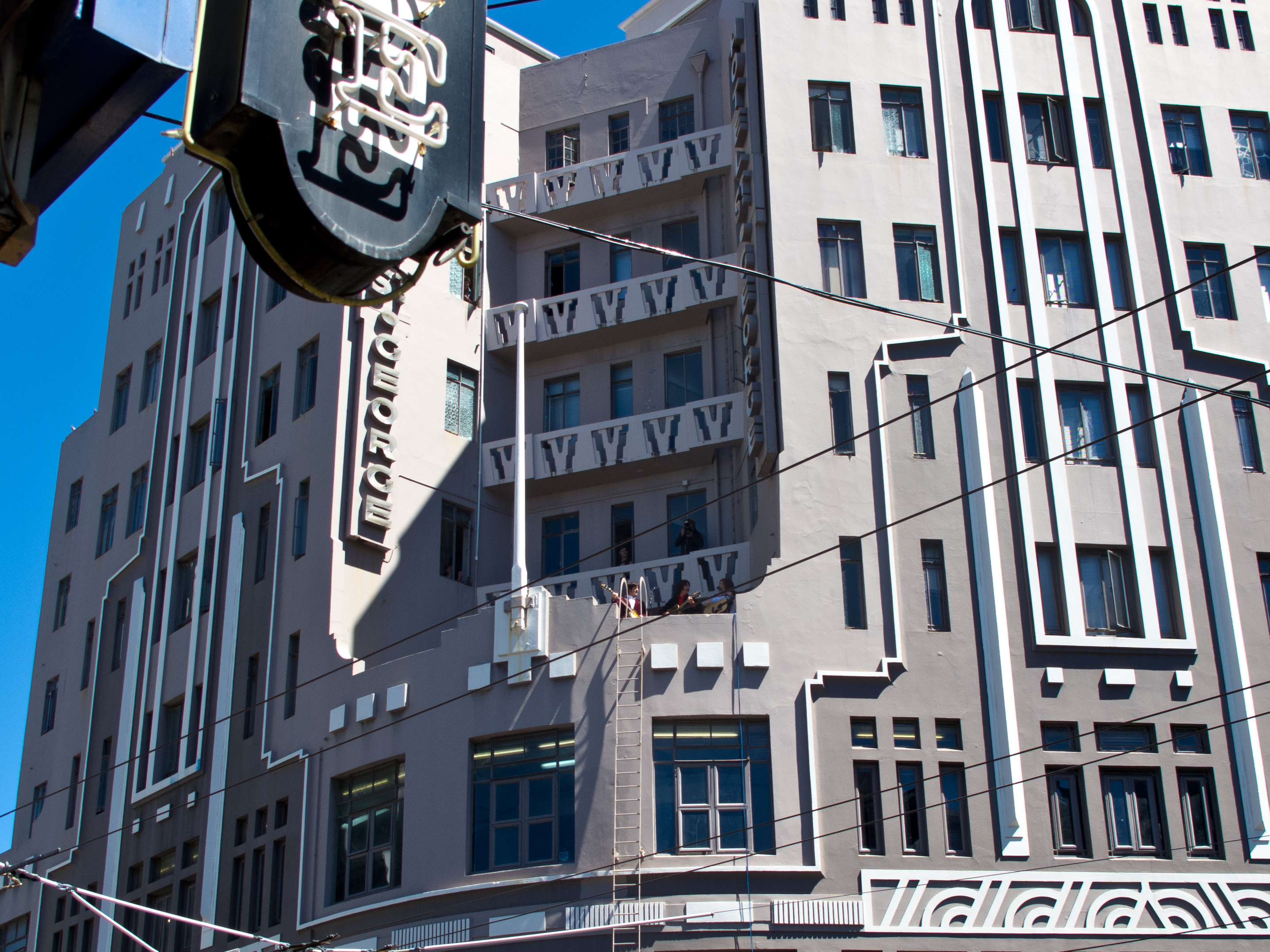
The Bootleg Beatles in October 2012, re-enacting the June 1964 Beatles visit with a performance from the same balcony.

The hotel was widely regarded as the capital city's top hotel, and played host to many events in its Palm Lounge. After the 1942 entry of the United States into World War II its accommodation was briefly seconded by US Marines and it featured with them in the 1957 movie Until They Sail. It was the first choice of hotel for visiting dignitaries for many years, from royalty to the Beatles to international sports teams.

The Beatles stayed in two suites on the sixth floor at the Hotel St George during their 1964 tour of New Zealand. Thousands of fans crowded the intersection in front of the hotel on the day the Beatles arrived, erupting into "a screaming frenzy" when the Beatles appeared to greet the crowd from the third-floor balcony at the front of the hotel. Two fans climbed a fire escape from the verandah to get to the group. In October 2012, The Bootleg Beatles re-enacted the Beatles' visit with a concert from the same balcony.

The hotel was also host to the inaugural New Zealand national science fiction convention in 1979, and was a venue for the convention in 1980 and 1987.

Hotel St George has a Category 2 listing with Heritage New Zealand.

== Festival of The Arts late night venue ==
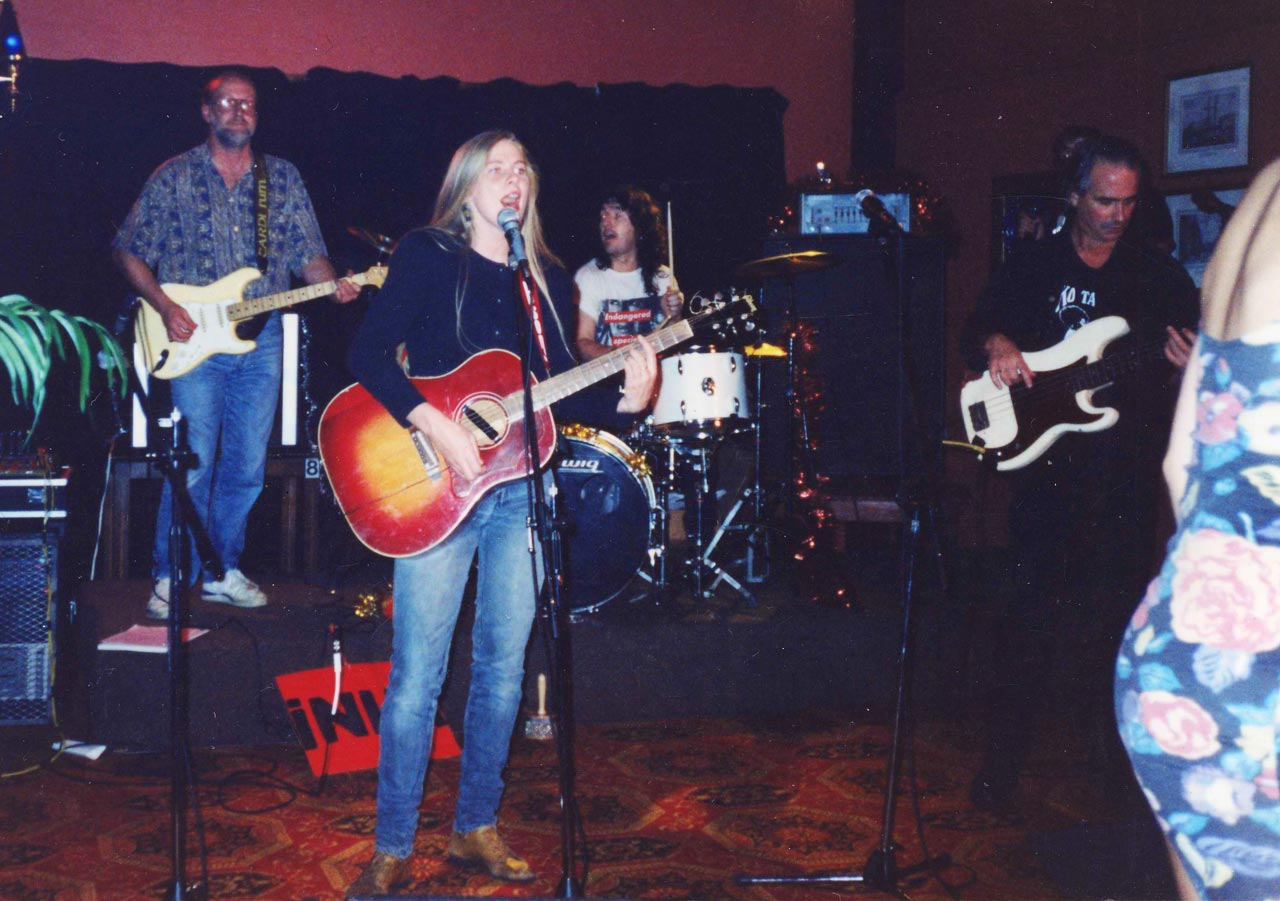
Mike Knapp, Simon Morris, Paul Walker, Wellington 1992

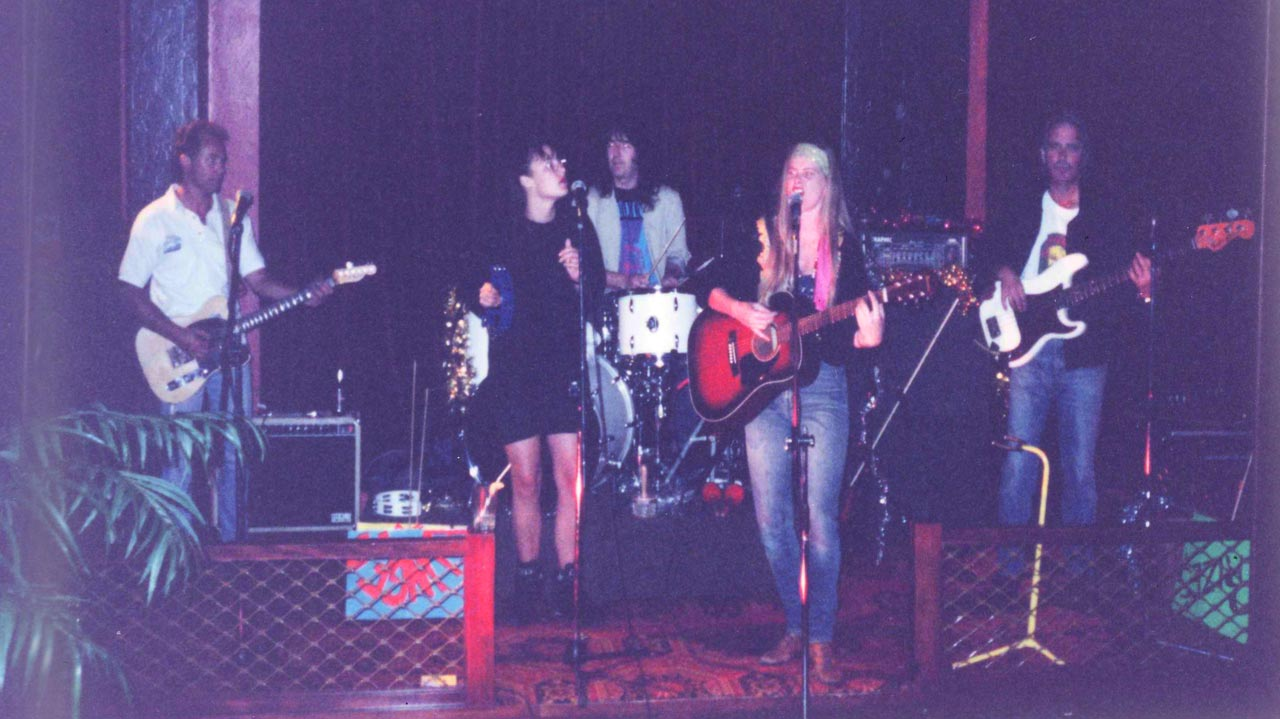
St George entertainment - Wellington 1992

In 1992 the third floor was used as an entertainment venue, for late night shows after the main performances around Wellington city. Many well known musicians from around New Zealand turned up to play in their own bands, or spontaneously created 'jam' bands. the television sets from all the unused rooms (the entire third floor) were arranged in an array, and computer graphics shown.

== Student accommodation ==
Wellington Polytechnic bought the hotel in September 1994, and after conversion opened it in 1995 as a 143-room student hostel. Massey University inherited the building after it merged with the polytechnic in 1999, and until 2006 used it for student accommodation, known as St George Hall. The building was sold again in 2004. Earthquake strengthening and other alterations were carried out during 2005 – 2006. In 2007 the hostel was being run by EdPac but they had financial problems and were put into receivership, so Victoria University took over the lease in 2008.

In 2009, Victoria University of Wellington decided not to renew the lease of St George Hall hostel, after the building was found not to meet modern earthquake codes.

In December 2010, Eyal Aharoni and his wife Antonietta (of Primeproperty Group) bought the mostly-vacant building with plans to eventually renovate it and turn it back into a hotel. Until then, it would be used as long-stay hostel accommodation. As of 2023 the operation is known as 'St George Accommodation', renting out single and double rooms with private or shared bathrooms for long-term stays.
