= Return to Paradise (short story collection) =

Book by James A. Michener

- First edition
- Author: James A. Michener
- Language: English
- Publisher: Random House
- Publication date: April 23, 1951
- Publication place: United States
- Media type: print
- Pages: 437

Return to Paradise (1951) is a collection of short stories written by American author James A. Michener. The collection is a sequel to the Pulitzer Prize-winning book Tales of the South Pacific, the collection that launched his career in 1947. In Return to Paradise, Michener revisits the islands and cultures of the South Pacific in the late 1940s, combining factual descriptions and tales set in such exotic places as Tahiti, Fiji, New Zealand, and Australia.

== Contents ==
- The Mighty Ocean
- The Atoll
- Mr. Morgan
- Polynesia
- Povenaa's Daughter
- Fiji
- The Mynah Birds
- Guadalcanal
- The Story
- Espiritu Santo
- The Good Life
- New Zealand
- Until They Sail
- Australia
- The Jungle
- New Guinea
- The Fossickers
- Rabaul
- What I Learned

== Reception ==
Orville Prescott of The New York Times wrote that all eight stories were "intelligent, competent, professional. But none of them can compare with the dozen or so best in 'Tales of the South Pacific.' To repeat an earlier success has always been one of the most difficult of literary tasks. Mr. Michener hasn't been able to bring it off." A. J. Liebling of The New Yorker wrote that Michener "has had to assume a number of expert roles, including those of anthropologist, linguist, historian, gastronome, economist, and expert on colonial administration, but he's handled this Hydra-headed assignment modestly and in an easy-going and sometimes distinguished style. His fictional pieces, however, seem to have been tossed off without any long period of incubation, and the points they make, while undoubtedly estimable, are arrived at in fairly obvious ways."

== Film adaptations ==
The story "Mr. Morgan" from Return to Paradise was made into a film of the same name in 1953 by United Artists. Starring Gary Cooper and Roberta Haynes, it was directed by Mark Robson, who also brought The Bridges at Toko-Ri, another Michener book, to screen one year later.

The story "Until They Sail" was filmed in 1957 as Until They Sail with Paul Newman and Jean Simmons and was directed by Robert Wise.
