= The Nebraskan =

1953 film directed by Fred F. Sears

- Directed by: Fred F. Sears
- Written by: David Lang, Martin Berkeley
- Produced by: Wallace MacDonald
- Starring: Phil Carey; Roberta Haynes; Lee Van Cleef
- Cinematography: Henry Freulich
- Edited by: Al Clark; James Sweeney
- Color process: Technicolor
- Production company: Columbia Pictures
- Distributed by: Columbia Pictures
- Release date: December 2, 1953 (Los Angeles)
- Running time: 68 minutes
- Country: United States
- Language: English

The Nebraskan is a 1953 3-D American Western film directed by Fred F. Sears starring Phil Carey and Roberta Haynes. The Nebraskan was one of seven feature films from prolific director Fred Sears that were released that year.

== Plot ==
Set in 1867 in the newly formed state of Nebraska, cavalry scout Wade Harper (Phil Carey) attempts to make peace with the Sioux Indians, who demand the handover of Wingfoot (Maurice Jara), an Indian scout who is believed to be responsible for the murder of their chief Thundercloud. While being held in the guardhouse at Fort Kearny, Wingfoot escapes with Reno (Lee Van Cleef), an army private awaiting trial for murder.

== Cast ==
- Philip Carey as Wade Harper
- Roberta Haynes as Paris
- Wallace Ford as McBride
- Richard Webb as Ace Eliot
- Lee Van Cleef as Reno
- Maurice Jara as Wingfoot
- Regis Toomey as Col. Markham
- Jay Silverheels as Spotted Bear
- Pat Hogan as Yellow Knife
- Dennis Weaver as Capt. DeWitt
- Boyd "Red" Morgan as Sgt. Phillips
