= Massacre Canyon (film) =

1954 film

- Theatrical release poster
- Directed by: Fred F. Sears
- Screenplay by: David Lang
- Produced by: Wallace MacDonald
- Starring: Philip Carey; Audrey Totter; Douglas Kennedy; Jeff Donnell; Guinn "Big Boy" Williams
- Cinematography: Lester White
- Edited by: Aaron Stell
- Music by: Mischa Bakaleinikoff
- Production company: Columbia Pictures
- Distributed by: Columbia Pictures
- Release date: May 1, 1954
- Running time: 66 minutes
- Country: United States
- Language: English

Massacre Canyon is a 1954 American Western film directed by Fred F. Sears and written by David Lang. The film stars Philip Carey, Audrey Totter, Douglas Kennedy, Jeff Donnell and Guinn "Big Boy" Williams. The film was released on May 1, 1954, by Columbia Pictures.

== Plot ==
An army detail transporting Henry rifles through Apache territory encounters a gun-runner, mail-order brides, a traitorous wife and a drunken army lieutenant. They find their escort massacred by renegade Apache Black Eagle.

== Cast ==
- Philip Carey as 2nd. Lieutenant Richard Arlington Faraday
- Audrey Totter as Flaxy
- Douglas Kennedy as Sergeant James Francis Marlowe
- Guinn "Big Boy" Williams as Private Archibald Peaceful Allen
- Ross Elliott as Private George W. Davis
- James Flavin as Colonel Joseph Tarant
- Bill Hale as Lt. Farnum
- John Pickard as Lt. Ridgeford
- Jeff Donnell as Cora
- Charlita as Gita
- Ralph Dumke as Phineas J. 'Parson' Canfield
- Mel Welles as Gonzáles
- Chris Alcaide as Running Horse
- Steven Ritch as Black Eagle
