= Philip Carey =

American actor (1925–2009)

- Carey in Philip Marlowe, 1959
- Born: Eugene Joseph Carey; July 15, 1925; Hackensack, New Jersey, U.S.
- Died: February 6, 2009 (aged 83); New York City, U.S.
- Other name: Phil Carey
- Occupation: Actor
- Years active: 1951–2008
- Spouses: Maureen Peppler (m. 1949; div. 1972); Colleen Harris (m. 1976)
- Children: 5

Philip Carey (born Eugene Joseph Carey, July 15, 1925 – February 6, 2009) was an American actor, well-known for playing the role of Asa Buchanan on the soap opera One Life to Live for nearly three decades.

== Early life and education ==
On July 15, 1925, Carey was born in Hackensack, New Jersey. He grew up in Rosedale, Queens, and Malverne, New York.

Carey studied drama at the University of Miami.

== Career ==
Carey served in the United States Marine Corps, was wounded as part of the ship's detachment of the USS Franklin during World War II, and served again in the Korean War.

Carey's acting career began in 1950. One of his earliest roles was Lt. (jg) Bob Perry in John Wayne's Operation Pacific. Carey also made appearances in films such as I Was a Communist for the FBI (1951), This Woman Is Dangerous with Joan Crawford (1952), The Nebraskan (1953), Calamity Jane with Doris Day (1953), They Rode West (1954), Pushover (1954), Mister Roberts (1955), The Long Gray Line (1955), Port Afrique (1956), and Screaming Mimi (1958).

In 1956, Carey starred on the NBC series Tales of the 77th Bengal Lancers. Carey's character was portrayed as Canadian because Carey reportedly could not master a British accent. Carey starred as Raymond Chandler's famous private eye in the short-lived 1959–1960 ABC television series Philip Marlowe. He played the character Dr. Simon Battle, gunfighter turned doctor in the 1961 episode "Death Trap" of The Rifleman. In 1961, he guest-starred in an episode of The Asphalt Jungle.

In a following 1962 episode, "Johnny Brassbuttons", Carey plays Marshal Frank Nolan assigned to bring back to justice a Native Indian accused of conspiracy to commit murder.

Carey had played General Custer himself in The Great Sioux Massacre (1965) and played Captain Myles Keogh at the Battle of the Little Big Horn in Walt Disney's Tonka in 1959.

During this period, Carey also appeared on CBS-TV hit sitcom The Lucy Show. The episode entitled "Lucy and the Runaway Butterfly" was broadcast on April 22, 1963. In that installment, Carey played Howard McClay, a boyfriend of Lucy Carmichael's (played by Lucille Ball).

In the 1970 television series Ironside, he guest starred with Vera Miles in a multi-part episode titled "Goodbye to Yesterday".

In 1971, Carey guest-starred on the landmark fifth installment of All in the Family, playing Steve, an ex–professional football player friend of Archie Bunker's, who tells Archie that he is gay. The episode is titled "Judging Books by Covers".

He also appeared in the low-budget horror film Monstroid in 1980.

Carey became well known for a series of tongue-in-cheek television commercials for Granny Goose potato chips, in which he self-identified as "Granny Goose", portraying the company's spokesperson as a tough cowboy.

=== One Life to Live ===
Carey joined the cast of One Life to Live in 1980, originating the role of ruthless business tycoon Asa Buchanan. During his time portraying the patriarch of the Buchanan family, he became one of the most often-married characters in daytime television. In addition to One Life to Live, he also played the role in one episode of All My Children in 2003 and another in 2004. A lifelong smoker, he was diagnosed with lung cancer in January 2006, and underwent chemotherapy.

In late March 2007, Carey was announced to be leaving One Life to Live, turning down an offer to go to recurring status with the show. The character subsequently died offscreen in August 2007, coinciding with the series' 10,000th episode celebration, which brought back characters from the show's past to attend the funeral. In November 2007, Carey briefly reprised the role for three episodes in Asa's videotaped will, airing November 9 to November 13, 2007. On July 16, 2008, he appeared as Asa's ghost, and also returned on July 21, 2008, for the series' 40th anniversary, as character Victoria Lord, Asa's former daughter-in-law visits Heaven after a car accident. He returned on August 19, 2008, as Asa's ghost. Carey appeared one last time on December 29, 2008, in a videotaped message recorded by Asa before his death.

== Personal life ==
In 1949, Carey married Maureen Peppler. They had three children, Jeff, Linda and Lisa. The marriage ended in a divorce. In 1976, Carey married Colleen Welch. They had two children, Sean and Shannon.

Carey was close friends with his on-screen sons Clint Ritchie (who died six days before Carey) and Robert S. Woods.

=== Death ===
On February 6, 2009, Carey died of lung cancer at age 83.

== Filmography ==
- Three Husbands (1950) as Officer McCarthy (uncredited)
- Operation Pacific (1951) as Lt. (j.g.) Bob Perry
- I Was a Communist for the FBI (1951) as Mason
- Inside the Walls of Folsom Prison (1951) as Red Pardue
- Tomorrow Is Another Day (1951) as Radio Announcer (voice, uncredited)
- Force of Arms (1951) as Military Police Sgt. Fred Miller (uncredited)
- The Tanks Are Coming (1951) as Lieutenant Rawson
- This Woman Is Dangerous (1952) as Will Jackson
- Cattle Town (1952) as Ben Curran
- Springfield Rifle (1952) as Capt. Edward Tennick
- Operation Secret (1952) as Captain Johnson / Radio Announcer (voice, uncredited)
- The Man Behind the Gun (1953) as Capt. Roy Giles
- The System (1953) as Radio Broadcaster (voice, uncredited)
- Gun Fury (1953) as Frank Slayton
- Calamity Jane (1953) as Lieutenant Danny Gilmartin
- The Nebraskan (1953) as Wade Harper
- Massacre Canyon (1954) as Lieutenant Richard Faraday
- The Outlaw Stallion (1954) as 'Doc' Woodrow
- Pushover (1954) as Rick McAllister
- They Rode West (1954) as Capt. Peter Blake
- Wyoming Renegades (1955) as Brady Sutton
- The Long Gray Line (1955) as Charles 'Chuck' Dotson
- Mister Roberts (1955) as Mannion
- Count Three and Pray (1955) as Albert Loomis
- Three Stripes in the Sun (1955) as Col. William Shepherd
- Port Afrique (1956) as Rip Reardon
- Wicked As They Come (1956) as Tim O'Bannion
- The Shadow on the Window (1957) as Detective Sgt. Tony Atlas
- Return to Warbow (1958) as Clay Hollister
- Screaming Mimi (1958) as Bill Sweeney
- Tonka (1958) as Capt. Miles Keogh
- The Trunk (1961) as Stephen Dorning
- Tales of Wells Fargo (1961) Season 6, Episode 2 "The Dodger"
- Cheyenne (1962) as Marshal Frank Nolan
- Black Gold (1962) as Frank McCandless
- FBI Code 98 as Inspector Leroy Gifford
- Dead Ringer (1964) as Sergeant Hoag
- The Time Travelers (1964) as Steve Connors
- Town Tamer (1965) as Jim Akins
- The Great Sioux Massacre (1965) as Colonel Custer
- A Time for Killing (1967)
- Three Guns for Texas (1968) as Capt. Edward A. Parmalee (1965 episodes of Laredo turned into a film)
- Once You Kiss a Stranger (1969) as Mike
- The Rebel Rousers (1970) as Rebel
- The Seven Minutes (1971) as Elmo Duncan
- Scream of the Wolf (1974) as Sheriff Vernon Bell
- Fighting Mad (1976) as Pierce Crabtree
- Monstroid (1980) as Barnes
