= The Bridges at Toko-Ri =

1954 American war film by Mark Robson

- Theatrical release poster
- Directed by: Mark Robson
- Screenplay by: Valentine Davies
- Story by: James Michener
- Produced by: William Perlberg; George Seaton
- Starring: William Holden; Mickey Rooney; Fredric March; Grace Kelly; Robert Strauss
- Cinematography: Loyal Griggs
- Edited by: Alma Macrorie
- Music by: Lyn Murray
- Production companies: Perlberg-Seaton Productions; Paramount Pictures Corp.
- Distributed by: Paramount Pictures
- Release dates: December 31, 1954 (Canada); January 20, 1955 (U.S.)
- Running time: 102 minutes
- Country: United States
- Language: English
- Box office: $4.7 million (US/Canada rentals)

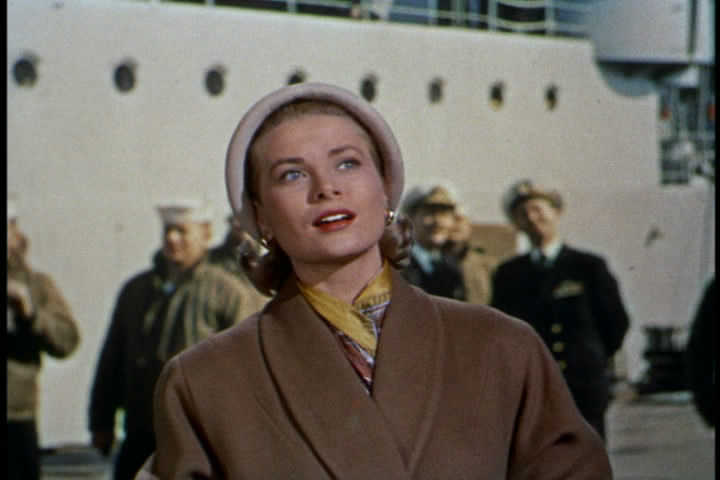
Grace Kelly as Nancy Brubaker.

The Bridges at Toko-Ri is a 1954 American war film about the Korean War and stars William Holden, Grace Kelly, Fredric March, Mickey Rooney, and Robert Strauss. The film, which was directed by Mark Robson, was produced by Paramount Pictures. (Note: Robson had earlier directed I Want You (1951), also dealing with the Korean War.) Dennis Weaver and Earl Holliman make early screen appearances in the film.

The screenplay is based on the 1953 novel The Bridges at Toko-ri by Pulitzer Prize winner James Michener. The story, which closely follows the novel, is about the U.S. Navy pilots assigned to bomb a group of heavily defended bridges in North Korea. It emphasizes the lives of the pilots and crew in the context of the Korean War; a conflict that seems remote to all except those who fight in Korea.

== Plot ==
Lieutenant Harry Brubaker is a Naval Reserve aviator called back to active duty to fly F9F Panthers in the Korean War. Returning from a mission with battle damage, he is forced to ditch and is rescued by a Sikorsky helicopter manned by Chief Petty Officer Mike Forney and Airman Nestor Gamidge.

Forney had been in trouble for brawling and wearing a non-regulation green top hat and scarf while flying his helicopter as encouragement to downed pilots in the water. Back aboard USS Savo Island, (Note: The real USS Savo Island (CVE-78) was actually decommissioned after World War II, before the Korean War) Brubaker is called to the quarters of Rear Admiral Tarrant, the Carrier Task Force 77 commander. Tarrant is interested in Brubaker, who reminds him of his son, a Navy Pilot killed in World War II. Brubaker complains about the unfairness of leaving his civilian attorney practice but Tarrant advises that, "All through history, men have had to fight the wrong war in the wrong place, but that's the one they're stuck with."

The Savo Island returns to Japan where Brubaker is given a three-day shore leave in Tokyo with his wife Nancy and their children. The reunion is interrupted when Gamidge asks Brubaker to bail Forney out of the brig after another brawl. Tarrant explains to a confused Nancy that Forney saved her husband from freezing to death when he ditched his jet, and warns her Brubaker will have to carry out a dangerous attack on the bridges at Toko-Ri once back in Korea.

Brubaker returns to duty flying wingman for Commander Lee on a dangerous reconnaissance mission to photograph the bridges. Lee uses the imagery to brief his pilots on their attack mission. Brubaker is unnerved but can't bring himself to quit the mission or compose a final letter to Nancy. The captain of the Savo Island exiles Forney to a helicopter scow as punishment for his indiscipline, and as he leaves the ship he shares with Brubaker his personal "cure" for bad nerves. Brubaker follows his advice of standing on the bow of the ship facing the waves and finds renewed strength.

The squadron attacks through intense antiaircraft fire and the bridges are destroyed without a loss, but Brubaker's jet is hit after Lee leads them to a secondary target. He tries to return to the carrier, but loss of altitude and fuel forces a crash-landing. Forney and Gamidge attempt to rescue him, but communist troops shoot down their helicopter. Gamidge is killed, and Forney takes cover in a muddy ditch with Brubaker. They try to hold off the enemy with pistols and M1 carbines but are overwhelmed by North Korean and Red Chinese soldiers. Tarrant, angered by news of Brubaker's death, demands Commander Lee explain why he attacked the second target. Lee defends his actions, noting that Brubaker was his pilot too, and that despite his loss, the mission was a success. Tarrant, realizing that Lee is correct, rhetorically asks, "Where do we get such men?"

== Cast ==
- William Holden as LT Harry Brubaker
- Grace Kelly as Nancy Brubaker
- Fredric March as RADM George Tarrant
- Mickey Rooney as CPO (NAP) Mike Forney
- Robert Strauss as "Beer Barrel"
- Charles McGraw as CDR Wayne Lee
- Keiko Awaji as Kimiko
- Earl Holliman as AMN (NAC) Nestor Gamidge
- Richard Shannon as Lieutenant Olds
- Dennis Weaver as Flight Intelligence Officer (uncredited)
- US Navy Commander Marshall Beebe as Pilot

== Production ==
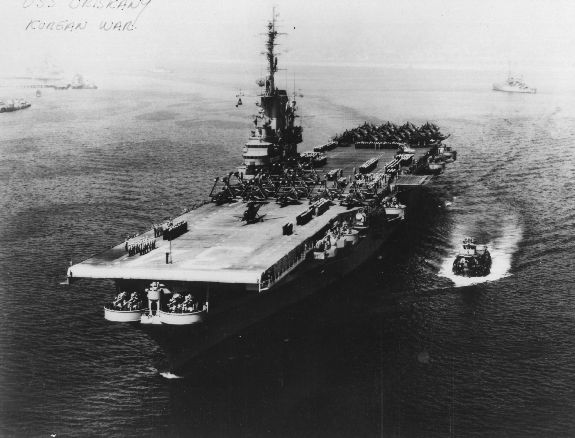
USS Oriskany during the Korean War

=== Writing ===
Michener based his novel on actual missions flown against the railroad bridges at Majon-ni and Samdong-ni, North Korea, during the winter of 1951–52, when he was a news correspondent aboard the aircraft carriers USS Essex and USS Oriskany. Michener based the character of Harry Brubaker on Lieutenant Donald S. Brubaker, who like his counterpart, was a 29-year-old Naval Reservist from Denver recalled to active duty aboard USS Valley Forge. The basis for Admiral Tarrant was Rear Admiral John Perry, the carrier division commander at the time; that of Lee was Commander Marshall U. Beebe, CAG aboard Essex in 1951 and technical advisor for the film; and Forney on Chief (NAP) Duane Thorin, himself a colorful enlisted pilot known for his trademark non-regulation green headgear.

The pilot's rescue attempt at the climax of the novel and film was a composite of a pair of unrelated rescue attempts on February 8, 1952, both in the area of Wonsan, North Korea, with the second one involving a propeller-driven Douglas AD-1 Skyraider from Valley Forge that had been shot down while bombing the railroad bridges at Samdong-ni. However, though the shot-down aviators in the second attempt were initially listed as missing in action, they survived their ordeal, and they were captured by North Korean soldiers.

In the attacks against the historical bridges, the McDonnell F2H Banshee fighter-bombers (represented by Grumman F9F Panther) that are at the heart of the story did not bomb the bridges themselves, since they did not have the capability of carrying the heavy aerial bombs that were needed. Instead, they carried out the perilous mission of suppressing enemy anti-aircraft fire.

=== Development ===
Film rights were purchased for $100,000 by the team of George Seaton and William Perlberg, who had a production unit at Paramount. They wanted Spencer Tracy for the role of admiral, but this was played by Fredric March.

=== Filming ===
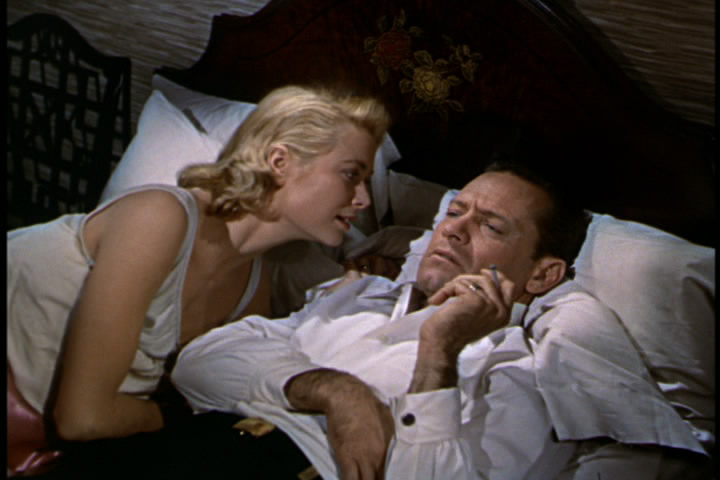
Grace Kelly and William Holden

Exteriors were shot aboard USS Oriskany and USS Kearsarge, 27,100-ton Essex-class aircraft carriers standing in for USS Savo Island. The aircraft used in the film is the Grumman F9F-2 Panther, a Korean War workhorse still in service and equipping the air groups of both carriers at the time the film was made. In the novel, however, Brubaker's squadron flew McDonnell F2H Banshees. The squadron depicted is an actual unit, Fighter Squadron 192 (VF-192) "Golden Dragons," which was aboard Oriskany during the filming, and from its part in the movie, thereafter, billed itself as the "World Famous Golden Dragons." VF-192 had two war deployments to Korea, but aboard USS Princeton and flying Vought F4U-4 Corsairs. (Note: Former child star and actor, Frank Coghlan, Jr., who was also a serving U.S. naval officer, provided the armed forces liaison for the film.) The movie also took advantage of the early uses of helicopters in the military. Rooney's character flies a S-51/HO3S-1/H-5F, G, H Sikorsky "DragonFly" which was well known as a naval rescue aircraft.

Location filming was also done in Post-War Japan at the US Naval Base in Yokosuka, Kanagawa, and the historic Fujiya Hotel at Hakone. A ranch in Thousand Oaks, California, was also used for filming.

== Release ==
Although the film was released in Canada in December 1954, it opened in the rest of the world, including the U.S., in 1955.

== Reception ==
The Bridges at Toko-Ri was well received by critics and public alike. As an example of the films that came out of the Korean War, it was considered more of a multi-faceted account that dealt with both ordinary seamen and command officers involved in combat. Typical of the reviews was one by Bosley Crowther of The New York Times, who noted how the film adaptation was true to the original story and was "vividly and movingly developed in this punctilious film." The movie premiered at the Radio City Music Hall. The close cooperation of the U.S. Navy led to spectacular aerial scenes as well as carrier action. A raid sequence with large scale models intercut with combat footage was a particularly effective scene that was later recognized in the Academy Awards.

=== Awards and honors ===
The Bridges at Toko-Ri won the Academy Award for Best Special Effects (1956) and Alma Macrorie was nominated for an Academy Award for Best Editing (1956). Mark Robson was also nominated for Outstanding Directorial Achievement in Motion Pictures in the Directors Guild of America Awards (1956).

=== Anti-war themes ===
Atypical of the World War II movies produced by Hollywood, The Bridges at Toko-Ri was considered a quiet anti-war themed movie. The Korean War never got the same attention in media as World War II as its geopolitical purpose in world security was considered dubious. Brubaker's character questions the purpose of the Korean War with the Rear Admiral and others. The final scenes of the movie document the hopeless deaths of the main protagonists as they lie in a muddy ditch in a foreign land. As the movie progresses through dangerous missions (ditching, flak fly throughs), Brubaker experiences moments of panic and PTSD as the Bridge mission looms closer and closer. Grace Kelly's character being a metaphorical representation of the country's confusion over the Korean War but remaining dutiful and unquestioning in its purpose.

=== In popular culture ===
In a scene from the 2021 movie Licorice Pizza, Sean Penn plays an aging actor named "Jack Holden" who starred with Grace Kelly in a film called The Bridges of Toko-San. Despite the name changes, this scene is an obvious allusion to William Holden and The Bridges at Toko-Ri (as is Tom Waits' character, director "Rex Blau", an obvious allusion to Mark Robson, director of Toko-Ri, in the same scene).
