= Gagaifo o le Vao =

Coordinates: 13.964°S 171.955°W

Gagaifo o le Vao is a village on the island of Upolu in Samoa. It is on the south coast of the island, in the Lefaga ma Faleaseela Electoral Constituency (Faipule District) which forms part of the larger A'ana political district.

The population is 585.

The village is also a sub-village pito nu'u of the larger village enclave of Lefaga.
