= Savaia =

Village in Upolu, Samoa

Coordinates: 13°57′18″S 171°57′30″W

Sāvaia is a village on the island of Upolu in Samoa. It is situated on the south west coast of the island and is part of the Lefaga ma Faleaseela Electoral Constituency (Faipule District) which forms part of the larger A'ana political district.

The population is 340.
