= Matautu, Lefaga =

Coordinates: 13.97°S 171.95°W

Matautu is a village in the large traditional settlement of Lefaga in Samoa. The village is situated on the south west coast of Upolu island and is part of the Lefaga ma Faleaseela Electoral Constituency (Faipule District) which forms part of the larger A'ana political district.

The population is 972.

It was the film location of Return to Paradise, starring Gary Cooper.

There are a number of villages and geographic areas called Matautu in Samoa.
