= Return to Paradise (1953 film) =

1953 film by Mark Robson

- Theatrical poster
- Directed by: Mark Robson
- Screenplay by: Charles Kaufman
- Based on: Return to Paradise; 1951 novel by James A. Michener
- Produced by: Harry Lenart; Mark Robson; Theron Warth; Robert Wise
- Starring: Gary Cooper; Barry Jones; Roberta Haynes; John Hudson
- Cinematography: Winton C. Hoch
- Edited by: Daniel Mandell
- Music by: Dimitri Tiomkin
- Color process: Technicolor
- Production company: Aspen Productions
- Distributed by: United Artists
- Release date: July 10, 1953 (United States)
- Running time: 100 minutes 88 minutes (TCM print)
- Country: United States
- Language: English
- Budget: $515,00
- Box office: $1.8 million (US)

Return to Paradise is an American South Seas adventure drama film released by United Artists in 1953. The film was directed by Mark Robson and starred Gary Cooper, Barry Jones and Roberta Haynes. It was based on a short story, "Mr. Morgan", by James Michener in his 1951 short story collection Return to Paradise, his sequel to his 1947 novel Tales of the South Pacific. It was filmed on location in Matautu, Lefaga Western Samoa (present-day Samoa).

== Plot ==
During the 1920s, itinerant American beachcomber Mr. Morgan is deposited in the village of Matareva on the island of Upolu, Samoa in the South Pacific. When he decides to stay he is confronted by Pastor Cobbett, who lost both his father and his wife as a young missionary on the island. Cobbett rules Matareva as a Puritanical despot, using local bullies as "wardens" to enforce his rules. "Morgan Tane" stays on Matareva by winning the support of the natives after he defeats the wardens with the aid of a shotgun (which is later revealed to be unloaded). Morgan has an illegitimate child, Turia, by island girl Maeva. When Maeva dies after childbirth, the distraught Morgan departs the island, leaving Turia behind with her grandmother.

Morgan returns to Matareva during World War II, where he reconciles with Cobbett, who has become a friend and teacher to the islanders, and meets Turia. She falls in love with an Army Air Force pilot, Harry Faber, after he crash-lands his cargo plane in the lagoon. An interesting irony is that when Morgan first arrived, Cobbett tried to force him to leave the island lest he get an island girl pregnant. Now he faces the same thing when Faber tries to seduce his daughter, Turia, as a diversion while awaiting pickup by the Navy. Morgan intervenes and makes Faber and his crew leave, using the same empty shotgun as an inducement. When Turia forgives him, Morgan decides to remain with her on Matareva.

== Cast ==
- Gary Cooper as Mr. Morgan
- Barry Jones as Pastor Thomas Cobbett
- Roberta Haynes as Maeva
- Moira MacDonald as Turia
- John Hudson as Capt. Harry Faber
- Le Mamea Matatumua Ata as Tonga
- Hans Kruse as Rori, age 21
- Terry Dunleavy as Mac
- Howard Poulson as Russ
- Donald Ashford as Cutler
- Herbert Ah Sue as Kura
- Va'a as Rori, age 9

== Soundtrack ==
The title song "Return to Paradise," by Dimitri Tiomkin and Ned Washington, was featured in the soundtrack. It has been recorded by artists including Nat King Cole, Bing Crosby and Shirley Horn.

== Home media ==
Return to Paradise was released on DVD on December 31, 2009, as part of the MGM Limited Edition Collection series.
