= Five Gates to Hell =

- Theatrical release poster
- Directed by: James Clavell
- Written by: James Clavell
- Produced by: James Clavell
- Starring: Dolores Michaels; Patricia Owens; Neville Brand; Ken Scott; Nobu McCarthy; Benson Fong
- Cinematography: Sam Leavitt
- Edited by: Harry W. Gerstad
- Music by: Paul Dunlap
- Production company: Associated Producers International
- Distributed by: 20th Century-Fox
- Release date: September 23, 1959
- Running time: 98 minutes
- Country: United States
- Language: English
- Budget: $300,000 approx

Five Gates to Hell is a 1959 American adventure film written and directed by James Clavell in CinemaScope. The film stars Dolores Michaels, Patricia Owens, Neville Brand, Ken Scott, Nobu McCarthy and Benson Fong. It was Clavell's directorial debut.

The film was released on September 23, 1959, by 20th Century-Fox.

== Plot ==
Several nurses including Athena Roberts, Joy Brooks and a Catholic nun, Sister Marie, and a surgeon, Dr. Richter, are taken captive in Indochina by a band of marauders led by Chen Pamok. He leads them to a jungle fortress guarded by five gates and heavily armed men and demands Dr. Richter treat the gravely ill Gung Sa, a warlord.

Chen becomes infatuated with Athena and, after she resists, she is raped. Richter diagnoses a malignant brain tumor and is told that, if his surgery does not save Gung Sa, he and the other prisoners will be put to death. When the patient survives, Richter is told the women will be kept as sex slaves but, as a reward, the doctor may choose one woman as his own. Although he is in love with Athena, he chooses Sister Marie, to spare her virtue.

Athena uses her wiles to lead a revolt, mowing down guerrillas with machine guns and leading an escape into the wild, Richter sacrificing his own life to help save theirs. Chen's men pursue and many from both sides are killed. Sister Marie, appreciating how protective the others have been of her, ultimately picks up a weapon to fight back. Athena is able to shoot Chen, who dies pledging his love for her.

== Cast ==
- Dolores Michaels as Athena Roberts
- Patricia Owens as Joy Brooks
- Neville Brand as Chen Pamok
- Ken Scott as Dr. John Richter
- Nobu McCarthy as Chioko
- Benson Fong as Gung Sa
- Nancy Kulp as Susette
- John Morley as Dr. Jacques Minelle
- Gerry Gaylor as Greta
- Shirley Knight as Sister Marie
- Greta Chi as Yoette
- Linda Wong as Ming Cha
- Irish McCalla as Sister Magdalena

== Production ==
The film was made by the production company of Robert L. Lippert who produced low budget films for distribution by 20th Century-Fox. Lippert wanted to make a modern-day war film set in Asia. Clavell had just written the very successful The Fly (1958) for Lippert was hired to write the script. Lippert was struggling to find a director and Harry Spalding, who was Lippert's story editor, suggested Clavell. Lippert had enjoyed success with first time directors before, such as Sam Fuller, and agreed. Spalding said Clavell's first draft "was practically perfect".

Irish McCalla was originally announced for the female lead. The role went to Gerri Gaylor.

The original title was Black Dragon, White Huntress. Filming started 22 June 1959.

== Reception ==
Robert L. Lippert described the film as a "sleeper".
