= Samuel Prescott (disambiguation) =

Samuel Prescott (1751–c. 1777) was a Massachusetts Patriot during the American Revolutionary War.

Samuel or Sam Prescott may also refer to:

- Samuel Cate Prescott (1872–1962), American food scientist and microbiologist
- Sam Prescott, character in Ambush at Cimarron Pass
