= Dolores Michaels =

American actress (1933–2001)

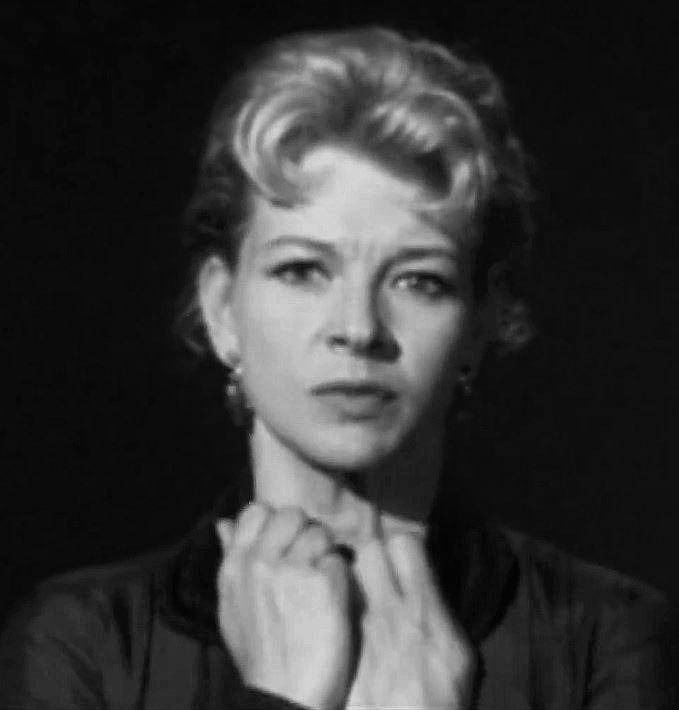
- Dolores Michaels in trailer for The Fiend Who Walked The West (1958)
- Born: Dolores Rae Michaels; January 30, 1933; Kansas City, Missouri, U.S.
- Died: September 25, 2001 (aged 68); West Hollywood, California, U.S.
- Other names: Sparky; Dolores Michaels Wolfe
- Occupation: Actor
- Years active: 1953–1963
- Spouse(s): Maurice Martiné (1953-1959; divorced); Bernard Wolfe (1964-1969; divorced)
- Children: 2

Dolores Rae Michaels (January 30, 1933 – September 25, 2001) was an American actress.

== Biography ==
=== Early life ===
Michaels was born in Kansas City, Missouri, to Raymond Roscoe Michaels and his wife Esther Marie Holcomb. Her father had been a baseball catcher. He then became a food broker.

Michaels had the same birthday as Franklin D. Roosevelt and was born five weeks before he was inaugurated as president of the United States on March 4. Before her third birthday her father sent the president a birthday card informing him of the connection. Roosevelt replied sending Dolores his best wishes on her birthday.

She began studying ballet at age five, and went to New York City to study dance and drama before she graduated from Bishop Hogan High School. Her older sister, Gloria Michaels, had gone to New York City and joined the traveling cast of Brigadoon. When the musical came to Kansas City, 16-year-old Dolores was invited to join them.

Michaels moved to Laguna Beach, California after she married interior decorator Maurice Martiné in 1953. They separated in 1958. In January 1959, she filed for divorce. At the hearing, she testified that Martiné had moved them into an expensive unfinished house, without heat or water, and that he expected her to bathe in the ocean, something she didn't want to do because she was constantly catching a cold. The divorce became final on September 29, 1959. During her separation and after the divorce, she dated actor John Duke.

=== Acting career ===
Michaels was discovered when she was doing a scene in an acting class at 20th Century-Fox's talent school. A group of producers and directors were in the audience, and after the scenes were finished, the audience voted on who gave the best performance. She won and got a contract with 20th Century-Fox.

Joanne Woodward was supposed to have the part of Mildred Pritchard in The Wayward Bus (1957), but Woodward dropped out to star in The Three Faces of Eve, and the part went to Michaels at the last minute, her first acting role. United Press International wrote in a review of the film that Michaels' "torrid" scene, a seduction scene in a hayloft where she makes a pass at the bus driver (Rick Jason), "manages to steal the sexiest scene in the picture", over better known sirens as Jayne Mansfield and Joan Collins, and wrote that Hollywood had not had a scene like this since Jane Russell in The Outlaw. Director Victor Vicas shot the scene twice, an "A" scene and a "B" scene, because of the censors.

Her publicist released a biography that stated she had attended the University of Kansas for one year and was a member of the Kappa Kappa Gamma sorority. But, people, trying to remember if they knew her, at both the university and the sorority could find no record of her at either entity. The fact was that she had enrolled at the university in the fall of 1951 and was "rushed" by the sorority, but she only stayed at the school a few weeks and then dropped out, and she did not join the sorority. Her publicist had fabricated her biography to enhance it.

Early in her Hollywood career, she struggled with her weight as she was a compulsive eater. After trying all kinds of diets, she realized that the problem was "mental". While a ballet dancer in New York City, her weight reached 152 pounds, this on a five-foot-five-inch frame. By the time she signed her contract with 20th Century-Fox, though, she weighed 135 pounds. She developed work-related anxiety; she lost weight when she was not working, but once she got a role, she started eating again, at times eating a two-pound box of chocolates in a single sitting. Michaels would eat fruit and cottage cheese all day and then raid the refrigerator at midnight, sometimes not even remembering that she had until she opened the refrigerator the next morning. The turning point came after the death of her father (he died April 15, 1959); he was the one who had pushed her in her career, and without him, she felt lost. She went into psychological analysis and learned that she needed to "respect" her job. Michaels went down to 115 pounds and her career took off. She told Associated Press Hollywood reporter Bob Thomas: "I'm convinced that most weight problems stem from mental causes. But most people who lose weight on diets gain it back because they don't know the reasons why they crave food. Generally it is because of some frustration in their lives." Her psychologist told her to act and not dance ballet.

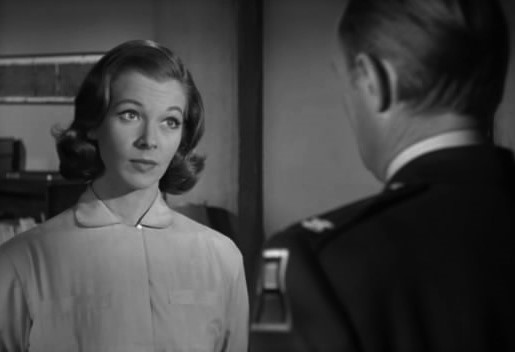
Michaels in Time Limit

Michaels wanted to be taken seriously as an actress and not be treated as a sex symbol. When one reporter asked her for her measurements, she responded "You can go to the wardrobe department and find out." She also said that she had never been asked to go to the studio photo gallery, stating, "That's part of the old Hollywood glamour nonsense. Also, it's in bad taste. I'm not a sexpot, I'm an actress." Later she told Hollywood columnist Erskine Johnson: "I favor the truly sensual photograph over the coyly teasing garter shots. I'd even rather be posed artistically nude than photographed giggling from behind a Venetian blind. I have never objected to posing. It's just that I wanted to build a career as an actress first."

Michaels' acting career lasted 10 years, from 1953 to 1963. Among her final appearances was the role of murderer Jo Sands in the 1962 Perry Mason episode "The Case of the Playboy Pugilist". She made her final appearance the following year on an episode of The Lloyd Bridges Show.

=== Later life ===
After dating actor John Duke, Michaels started dating Argentine actor Alejandro Rey, whom she met on the set of Battle at Bloody Beach. She then started dating novelist-screenwriter Bernard Wolfe (1915–1985), who proposed to her in 1962, but she sent the engagement ring back to him with a note that read "I don't wanna." Michaels and Wolfe married in Los Angeles on June 1, 1964. The marriage was her second and his first. He was 48 and she was 31. She and Wolfe had twin daughters, Jordan and Miranda, born in Los Angeles on July 23, 1970. Most sources say they divorced in 1969, one says they remained married until Wolfe's death.

=== Death ===
Dolores Michaels Wolfe died at the age of 68 in West Hollywood, California of natural causes on September 25, 2001.

== Filmography ==
- The French Line (1953) (uncredited) as Model
- Son of Sinbad (1955) (uncredited) as Harem Girl
- Science Fiction Theatre as Desk Clerk (1 episode, 1956)
- The Wayward Bus (1957) as Mildred Pritchard
- Time Limit (1957) as Cpl. Jean Evans
- April Love (1957) as Fran Templeton
- Fräulein (1958) as Lori the piano player
- The Fiend Who Walked the West (1958) as May Matthewson
- Warlock (1959) as Jessie Marlow
- Five Gates to Hell (1959) as Athena
- One Foot in Hell (1960) as Julie Reynolds
- Battle at Bloody Beach (1961) as Ruth Benson
- Bus Stop as Louise Willis (1 episode, 1961)
- Laramie as Nona (1 episode, 1962)
- Perry Mason as Jo Sands (1 episode, 1962)
- Route 66 as Medith (1 episode, 1962)
- The Lloyd Bridges Show as Carol Wade (1 episode, 1963)
