= Ken Scott (actor) =

American actor (1928–1986)

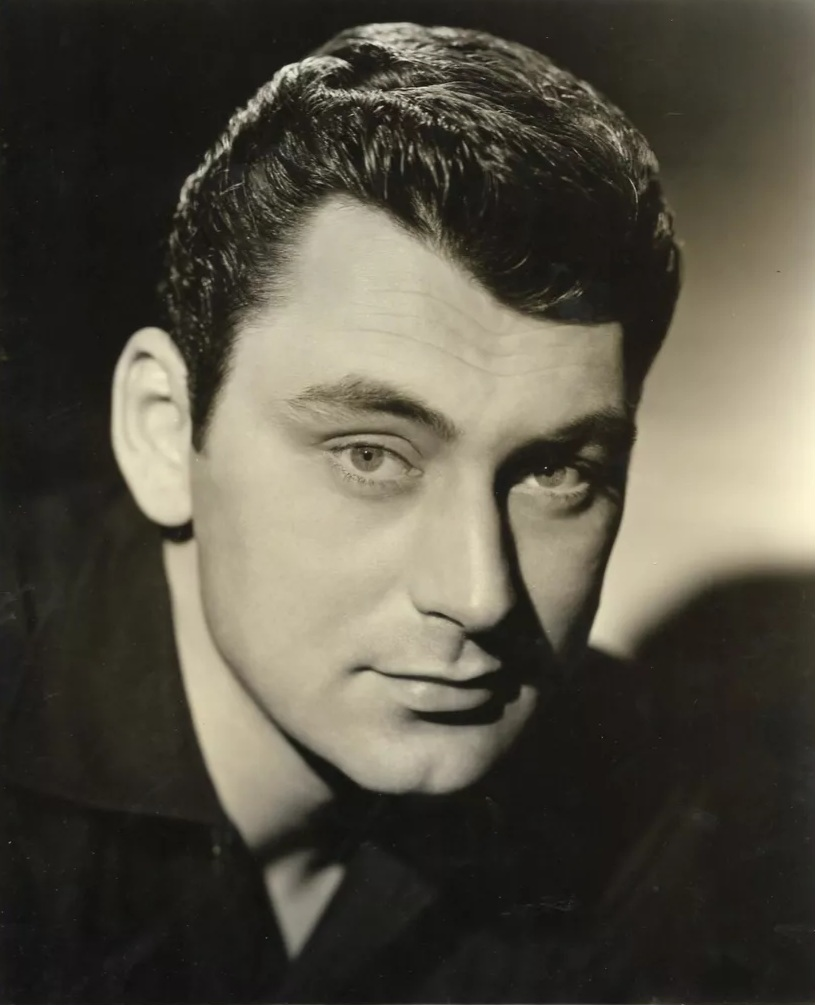
- Scott in the 1930s
- Born: Kenneth E. Schibath; October 13, 1928; Brooklyn, New York, U.S.
- Died: December 2, 1986 (aged 58)
- Occupation: Actor
- Years active: 1956–1984

Kenneth E. Schibath (October 13, 1928 – December 2, 1986), known professionally as Ken Scott, was an American actor best known for his work in the film industry during the 1950s, and career in television beyond that.

== Biography ==
Born in Brooklyn, New York, Scott was the son of interior decorator Ernst Schibath and attended school at Erasmus Hall High School and Colby Academy. He worked as a truck driver, an artist, an actor, a salesman, and finally a TV announcer at WDSU-TV in New Orleans. Discovered by producer Buddy Adler on a television show, he was contracted to 20th Century Fox on Oct. 8, 1956, with his first work narrating the film Three Brave Men.

Scott had lead roles in several of the studio's API second features and made appearances in some of Fox's major films. Following his years at Fox he appeared as a guest star on numerous American television series,

Scott was cast as Johnny Ringo in the 1963 episode, "The Melancholy Gun", of the syndicated television anthology series, Death Valley Days, hosted by Stanley Andrews. In the storyline, Ringo, an expert gunslinger with a mysterious past, seeks to lead a more respectable life. However, many want to build their reputations by challenging Ringo's shooting skills. Other stars cast in the episode include Elizabeth MacRae who was cast as Ringo's romantic interest, Myra Engles, as well as Denver Pyle, cast as a physician.

In the 1964 Death Valley Days episode, "Trial at Belle Springs", Scott played historical figure Virgil Earp, who goes undercover to break a robbery ring run by Belle Wilgus (Lynn Bari).

In 1965, Scott teamed up again with McRae (under a more jaded romantic interest) in the season 10, episode 20 offering “Circus Trick” on Gunsmoke.

== Select credits ==
- Three Brave Men (1956) – Naval Investigator (uncredited)
- The True Story of Jesse James (1957)
- The Way to the Gold (1957) – Intern
- The Three Faces of Eve (1957) – Earl
- Stopover Tokyo (1957) – Tony Barrett
- From Hell to Texas (1958) – Otis Boyd
- The Bravados (1958) – Primo – Deputy Sheriff
- The Fiend Who Walked the West (1958) – Paul Finney
- Woman Obsessed (1959) – Sergeant Le Moyne
- This Earth Is Mine (1959) – Luigi Griffanti
- A Private's Affair (1959) – Sgt. Tevlin (uncredited)
- Five Gates to Hell (1959) – Dr. John Richter
- Beloved Infidel (1959) – Robinson
- Desire in the Dust (1960) – Lonnie Wilson
- The Fiercest Heart (1961) – Harry Carter
- Pirates of Tortuga (1961) – Bart Paxton
- The Second Time Around (1961) – Sheriff Burns
- Police Nurse (1963) – Art Devlin
- Raiders from Beneath the Sea (1964) – Bill Harper
- Death Valley Days (1965) - Ken Scott, Episode: The Red Shawl
- The Naked Brigade (1965) – Christo
- The Murder Game (1965) – Steve Baldwin
- Fantastic Voyage (1966) – Secret Service
- Batman (1967) – Riddler henchman (Down)
- The St. Valentine's Day Massacre (1967) – Policeman (uncredited)
- Psych-Out (1968) – Preacher
- The Roommates (1973) – Marty
- Fabulous Fanny (1975) - Rabbi
- The Gumball Rally (1976) - Fred
- Double Exposure (1982) – Husband
