= House of the Damned (1963 film) =

1963 film by Maury Dexter

- Theatrical poster
- Directed by: Maury Dexter
- Written by: Harry Spalding
- Produced by: Maury Dexter
- Starring: Ron Foster; Merry Anders; Richard Crane; Erika Peters
- Cinematography: John M. Nickolaus, Jr.
- Edited by: Jodie Copelan
- Music by: Henry Vars
- Color process: Black and white
- Production company: Associated Producers
- Distributed by: 20th Century Fox
- Release date: March 26, 1963
- Running time: 63 minutes
- Country: United States
- Language: English

House of the Damned is a 1963 American horror thriller film shot in CinemaScope. It was directed and produced by Maury Dexter, and stars Ron Foster, Merry Anders, Richard Crane and Erika Peters. It was written by Harry Spalding and was an Associated Producers production.

== Plot ==
Architect Scott Campbell and his wife survey an old mansion where the previous tenant disappeared. Strange noises, eerie sights and vanishing keys ruin their attempt at a wedding anniversary. Things get worse after Scott's employer and his wife arrive, and his employer's wife is kidnapped.

== Cast ==
- Ron Foster as Scott Campbell
- Merry Anders as Nancy Campbell
- Richard Crane as Joseph Schiller
- Erika Peters as Loy Schiller
- Dal McKennon as Mr. Quinby
- Georgia Schmidt as Priscilla Rochester
- Stacey Winters as Nurse
- Richard Kiel as The Giant
- Ayllene Gibbons as The Fat Woman
- John Gilmore as The Legless Man
- Frieda Pushnik as The Legless Girl

== Production ==
Harry Spalding said he was inspired to write the film by the movie Freaks (1932) and wondering what happened to the sort of characters who used to work in freak shows in circuses.

Exteriors are filmed at the former Bugsy Siegel Mansion (later owned by Madonna) in the Hollywood Hills overlooking Lake Hollywood reservoir.

The movie was shot over seven days.

== Home media ==
The film was released on DVD by 20th Century Fox on September 5, 2006. The company would release the film again in 2010 as a part of its 4-disc 75th Anniversary Studio Classics collection. It was later released by Fox on June 27, 2017.

== Reception ==
The Monthly Film Bulletin wrote: "Here is another example of a small-budget thriller given a fresh look by means of clean, sharp direction and photography and a cunning awareness of audience gullibility. Basically, the film is a collection of corny haunted house tricks – mysterious sealed doors, looming shadows, strange confrontations – yet the tension is artfully sustained as one red herring gives way to another. It also confirms that Maury Dexter is the most capable second-feature director working in Hollywood at present (an embryo Corman perhaps?), who is able to make a compact and professional job from very limited means. The appearance of genuine freaks at the end is both surprising and rather touching, and makes a change from the usual blood-letting finale."

Boxoffice wrote: "At best a feeble imitation of some of the fondly remembered adventures in nail-chewing, seat-gripping suspense-shock yarns, this Maury Dexter produced-and-directed effort ... carries little distinction and will get its best reaction as supporting fare. Harry Spalding's screenplay is a relatively shockless conglomeration of events and episodes all too familiar to the crowd ... Since the pattern of plotting isn't particularly imaginative, the force of impact is little, if any. Maury Dexter, valiantly striving to provide a stream of modest-budgeted attractions for API, directs spiritedly enough, but he is handicapped from opening to closing shots by a hopelessly inept screenplay."

Author and film critic Leonard Maltin awarded the film two out of four stars, calling it "Modestly suspenseful" but criticized the film's ending as being "surprisingly wistful".

Brett Gallman from Oh, the Horror! gave the film a mixed review, commending the film's moody cinematography, atmosphere, and occasional chills generated by the title house's tenants, but criticized the film's underwhelming revelation, and "failure to deliver on its intrigue".
