= The Wayward Bus (film) =

1957 film directed by Victor Vicas

John Steinbeck's The Wayward Bus
- Theatrical release poster
- Directed by: Victor Vicas
- Screenplay by: Ivan Moffat
- Based on: The Wayward Bus; 1947 novel by John Steinbeck
- Produced by: Charles Brackett
- Starring: Joan Collins; Jayne Mansfield; Dan Dailey; Rick Jason
- Cinematography: Charles G. Clarke
- Edited by: Louis Loeffler
- Music by: Leigh Harline
- Distributed by: 20th Century-Fox
- Release date: May 27, 1957 (United States)
- Running time: 87 minutes
- Country: United States
- Language: English
- Budget: $1.4 million
- Box office: $1.75 million (US rentals)

The Wayward Bus is a 1957 American drama film directed by Victor Vicas and starring Joan Collins, Jayne Mansfield, Dan Dailey and Rick Jason. Released by 20th Century-Fox, the film was based on the 1947 novel of the same name by John Steinbeck.

== Plot ==
Alice Chicoy is the wife of driver Johnny. He owns a small, rundown bus that makes side trips. Alice is the owner of a little restaurant in Rebel Corners and likes liquor a bit too much.

Unhappy with what has become of her life, she decides to "surprise" her husband midway through his bus trip. Among the passengers, Camille Oakes is a burlesque dancer on the way to a well-paying job in San Juan. Camille gets caught up in a flirtation with traveling salesman Ernest Horton.

Most of the story takes place on the bus. Slowly making their way through a treacherous California mountain region, the passengers undergo a variety of life-altering experiences. The journey has its most profound effects upon the iconoclastic salesman and the lonely burlesque dancer.

== Cast ==
- Joan Collins as Alice Chicoy
- Jayne Mansfield as Camille Oakes
- Dan Dailey as Ernest Horton
- Rick Jason as Johnny Chicoy
- Betty Lou Keim as Norma, the counter girl
- Dolores Michaels as Mildred Pritchard
- Larry Keating as Elliott Pritchard
- Robert Bray as Morse
- Kathryn Givney as Mrs. Bernice Pritchard
- Dee Pollock as Pimples Carson
- Will Wright as Van Brunt

Uncredited (in order of appearance)
Max Wagner	Passenger trying to sleep in left front seat of bus arriving at Johnny and Alice's bus stop café
Anna Luther	Passenger sleeping in right front seat of bus arriving at Johnny and Alice's bus stop café
Tom Greenway	Mr. Breed, owner of gas station servicing Johnny's bus after landslide
Joe Devlin	Bus dispatcher at San Juan bus terminal who tells Johnny, "You're blocking number six... get on your loading spot"
Milton Frome	Mr. Stanton at San Juan bus terminal who tells Celeste that her performance is scheduled for tomorrow night
Minta Durfee	Woman at San Juan bus terminal who is annoyed at Johnny standing in front of ladies room door waiting for Alice

== Production ==
=== Development ===
Steinbeck completed the novel in 1946 for publication in 1947. Because it was his first novel since The Grapes of Wrath, there was Hollywood interest in it prior to publication.

In March 1947 George Stevens announced that he had bought screen rights to the novel on behalf of Liberty Films, the production company he established after the war along with Frank Capra, William Wyler and Sam Briskin. Steinbeck received a cash down payment and a percentage of the profits. He wanted Barbara Bel Geddes to star.

=== Charles Feldman ===
Liberty Films wound up folding relatively quickly. In June 1949, Charles Feldman announced the novel was one of four properties he was developing for screen treatment (others being the plays The Silver Whistle and Finian's Rainbow and the novel Tender Mercy). Gene Solow was writing a script based on the novel. Feldman wanted Charles Boyer and Gertrude Lawrence to star.

In January 1952 Feldman announced that William Saroyan had written a script and he wanted to start filming in April at Sam Goldwyn Studios. He said Jennifer Jones wanted to star and he hoped to get Marlon Brando as the male lead under the direction of George Stevens. Feldman said Saroyan's screenplay had some new characters not in the book and a "more sharply defined love story" which took the book out of its "original Grand Hotel style."

In February 1953 Feldman announced that one of the key roles would be played by Geraldine Page who had just signed a seven-year contract with Feldman off the back of her stage success.

In July 1954 Henry Hathaway was announced as director.

=== 20th Century-Fox ===
In September 1955, Feldman sold his rights in the novel to 20th Century-Fox. It was part of a package deal along with five other properties, the others being Bernadine, Heaven Knows, Mr Allison, Hilda Crane, Lonely Steeple and Tender Mercy.

By May 1956. Charles Brackett was assigned as producer, and Susan Hayward was going to star as Alice. Jayne Mansfield was going to star but could not get out of a commitment to appear in Will Success Spoil Rock Hunter? on Broadway. Robert Mitchum was going to star under a new long-term contract he had signed with 20th Century-Fox. Hathaway was attached to direct.

In June 1956 Hayward pulled out, declaring that she had just played an alcoholic in I'll Cry Tomorrow and did not want to play another one.

Fox eventually decided to delay production until Mansfield had finished her run in Rock Hunter so she could appear in the film.

In August. Richard Widmark signed to star. He was soon followed by Gene Tierney. By October, Hathaway dropped out as director. Tierney also pulled out, saying she did not feel up to the role.

The studio wanted to cast Shelley Winters in a key role but she would only do it if the studio would also cast her in the big screen version of A Hatful of Rain, which she had played on Broadway. Fox refused and Joan Collins was cast instead. Studio contract player Rick Jason was given a key part.

Joanne Woodward intended to play Mildred Pritchard, but dropped out to star in The Three Faces of Eve, and the role went to Dolores Michaels, her first acting role.

=== Shooting ===
Victor Vicas was chosen to direct. He also wrote the script with Ivan Moffat. "We've had to make a few changes," said Vicas about the novel. "We've reduced the sex angle so it's acceptable to the film medium, lowered the overall ages of the passengers and thrown in a few of the modern conveniences such as a helicopter rescue service. In addition, we've supplied a bit more suspense to the bus ride. A landslide which just misses the bus for example, and a bridge going out under the weight of the vehicle. And instead of the bus getting mired in the mud, we have it caught with one wheel over the edge of a cliff on a washed out road."

Filming started January 1957.

== Reception ==
The film received disappointing reviews. Fox had hoped to repeat the success of 1956's Bus Stop (starring Marilyn Monroe), but ended up crafting the Steinbeck novel into what one commentator called "the kind of lowbrow schlock the novel had satirized".

United Press International wrote in a review of the film that Michaels' "torrid" scene, a seduction scene in a hayloft where she makes a pass at the bus driver (Rick Jason), "manages to steal the sexiest scene in the picture," over better known actresses Jayne Mansfield and Joan Collins, and wrote that Hollywood had not had a scene like it since Jane Russell in The Outlaw. Director Victor Vicas shot two versions, an "A" scene and a "B" scene, because of the censors.

== Award nominations ==
The Wayward Bus was one of 33 films nominated for the Golden Berlin Bear Award at the 7th Berlin International Film Festival.

== Home media ==
The film was released on Blu-ray in June 2012 by Twilight Time under license from 20th Century Fox.
