= Jo Helton =

American actress (1933–2021)

- Born: Joan Jeter; June 7, 1933; Jackson, Tennessee, U.S.
- Died: March 26, 2021 (aged 87); Nashville, Tennessee, U.S.
- Education: Memphis State University; University of Tennessee
- Occupations: Actress, social worker
- Spouse: Ray Wintker (m. 1968; died 1997)
- Children: 2

Jo Helton (born Joan Jeter; June 7, 1933 – March 26, 2021) was an American actress on stage, film, and television and a social worker.

== Early years ==
Helton was born Joan Jeter in Jackson, Tennessee, on June 7, 1933, the daughter of Mr. and Mrs. W. H. Jeter. She graduated from Jackson High school and Memphis State University (MSU), where her studies focused on acting. While she was there, she married her high-school sweetheart. He was drafted and stationed in New Jersey, and while they lived there she studied under actress Uta Hagen. During that time she worked as a typist, secretary, and file clerk, taking "whatever was available" to meet expenses.

== Career ==
Before she became a professional actress, Helton was a copywriter for an advertising agency in Memphis, Tennessee.

=== Acting ===
Helton performed in Memphis with Theatre 12 (later known as Front Street Theatre). In 1958, she was leading lady of the Cincinnati Summer Playhouse. While she was in New York City, she was the stand-in for Kim Novak during filming of Middle of the Night (1959). Then she went to Hollywood and began acting on film and television. She portrayed nurse Conant on Dr. Kildare on TV. Other shows on which she appeared included Gunsmoke, The Twilight Zone, and The Untouchables.

She portrayed nurse Everley Hayes in the film Bill Wallace of China (1967) and appeared in the films The Young Swingers (1963), The Yellow Canary (1963), Ready for the People (1964), and The Slender Thread (1965).

Helton's work on stage included acting at the Theaterama Playhouse and the Professional Theater Center in California.

=== Social work ===
Acting left Helton feeling unsatisfied. She said, "I knew there were people on the other side of the bright lights with problems and feelings and I had a growing compulsion to be with those people -- to help them." She left California, selling one house and giving up the lease on another, and applied to be a volunteer with Volunteers in Service to America. Although that application was rejected, she put her "treasured antiques" in her station wagon, gave away the rest of her things, and returned to Tennessee.

After taking a class in sociology at MSU, Helton enrolled in the University of Tennessee-Knoxville's vocational rehabilitation counselor training program. University officials granted her a leave of absence for one quarter to make the Wallace film. She returned to the program and graduated with a master's degree in rehab counseling. Over the course of her graduate studies she did internships as a counselor in Oak Ridge, Tennessee; Milledgeville, Georgia; and Knoxville, Tennessee. After graduating, she became superintendent of the Vocational School for Girls in Nashville. She initiated a program there that had girls volunteering to help people with mental or physical handicaps at Outlook Nashville, and she later became executive director of Outlook Nashville.

== Personal life and death ==
After Helton made the Wallace film, which related the life and death of a Southern Baptist medical missionary who was killed in China, she spoke to Baptist groups about her experiences, sometimes along with the showing of the film.

Helton was divorced from her first husband after she had become known as an actress, so she kept her married name. She married Ray Wintker in 1968, and they remained wed until his death in 1997. They had two daughters. She died on March 16, 2021, in Nashville, Tennessee.

== Selected filmography ==
- North to Alaska (1960) as Dance Hall Girl (uncredited)
- Peter Gunn (1961) (Season 3 Episode 27: "Short a Motive") as Ellen Clary
- The Twilight Zone (1961) (Season 3 Episode 3: "The Shelter") as Martha Harlowe
- Alfred Hitchcock Presents (1962) (Season 7 Episode 14: "Bad Actor") as Secretary
- The Twilight Zone (1963) (Season 4 Episode 16: "On Thursday We Leave for Home") as Julie Baines
- Gunsmoke (1963) (Season 8 Episode 32: "Tell Chester") as Wendy
