= The Young Swingers =

1963 film by Maury Dexter

- Theatrical release poster
- Directed by: Maury Dexter
- Screenplay by: Harry Spalding
- Produced by: Maury Dexter
- Starring: Rod Lauren; Molly Bee; Gene McDaniels; Jack Larson; Karen Gunderson; Jo Helton
- Cinematography: Jacques R. Marquette
- Edited by: Jodie Copelan
- Music by: Hank Levine
- Production company: 20th Century Fox
- Distributed by: 20th Century Fox
- Release date: September 1963
- Running time: 71 minutes
- Country: United States
- Language: English

The Young Swingers (also known as Come to the Party) is a 1963 American musical comedy film directed by Maury Dexter and written by Harry Spalding. The film stars Rod Lauren, Molly Bee, Gene McDaniels, Jack Larson, Karen Gunderson and Jo Helton. It was released in September 1963 by 20th Century Fox.

== Plot ==
Vicki Crawford's aunt owns a building currently being used as a nightclub. Vicki takes a job there and falls in love with singer Mel Hudson, together hoping her Aunt Roberta will change her mind about tearing the building down.

A party is planned for Vicki's 21st birthday, but the club is destroyed by a fire. Vicki suspects her aunt of arson, but Mel proves to her satisfaction that faulty wiring was responsible for the blaze. Roberta has a change of heart, and she is willing to build a new club for Vicki and the other performers.

== Cast ==
- Rod Lauren as Mel Hudson
- Molly Bee as Vicki Crawford
- Gene McDaniels as Fred Lewis
- Jack Larson as Pete Mundy
- Karen Gunderson as Judi Sherwood
- Jo Helton as Roberta Crawford
- John Merritt as Ken Sherwood
- Justin Smith as Bruce Webster
- Jerry Summers as Roger Kelly
- Jack Younger as Irving Bird

== Reception ==
Boxoffice wrote: "Admirably compact and concisely concerned with the reigning young folk appeal of the day – Hootenanny – this latest by Associated Producers, Inc., Maury Dexter produced-and-directed, should please the general mass market. Predictably, it's at its best when the sound of music holds forth. The Harry Spalding screenplay isn't in the best tradition, being more a compilation of interwoven events and episodes spun out haphazardly against the setting of a young-folk club. ... The pacing is light and demands on absorbing not too great."
