= Greta Chi =

Danish born actress

- Born: Chi Ke Ping; Copenhagen, Denmark
- Other names: Chi Ke Ping, Greta Maxwell
- Occupations: Actress, business owner
- Years active: 1959–1976

Greta Chi (born July 4, 1940) Chi Ke Ping; Copenhagen, Denmark), is an actress who was active in the 1960s and 1970s in the U.S.

== Biography ==
The daughter of a Chinese diplomat father and a German mother, she had some cachet as an "exotic" starlet in the 1950s and '60s. She appeared in supporting parts in lower-budget U.S. and foreign movies, as well as some television shows. Although she had only one starring role in the movie Lisette (Fall Girl) in 1961 with John Agar, she is best known for her role as Ling-Ling, a Siamese cat transformed into a human by Samantha Stephens in a 1965 episode of Bewitched titled "Ling Ling" (Season 1 episode 21)

=== Personal life ===
Chi is currently living in Lucerne, Switzerland, where she has spent most of her life. She married and became known as Greta Maxwell. Her father founded a Chinese restaurant, Li Tai Pe, in Lucerne. After her parents' deaths, she became the owner and manager of the restaurant.

== Filmography ==
1. Five Gates to Hell (as Yoette; 1959)
2. Lisette (Fall Girl) (as Lisette; 1961)
3. Queen of The Chantecler (as Mata Hari; 1962)
4. Coffin from Hong Kong (1964)
5. Fathom (as KGB Major Jo May Soon; 1967)
6. Farewell to Manzanar (documentary; 1976)

== Television appearances ==
1. The Brothers Brannagan (as Tina in "The Key of Jade"; 1960)
2. Adventures in Paradise (as Tara in "The Beach at Belle Anse"; 1962)
3. Bewitched (as Ling Ling; 1965)
4. The Rogues (1965)
5. Burke's Law (as Kara in "The Prisoners of Mr. Sin"; 1965)
6. Get Christie Love! ("Deadly Justice"; 1974)
7. Police Story (as Barbara Chang in "Year of the Dragon: Part 2"; 1975)
