= The Wayward Bus =

Novel by John Steinbeck

- First edition cover
- Author: John Steinbeck
- Cover artist: Robert Hallock
- Language: English
- Publisher: Viking Press
- Publication date: 1947
- Publication place: United States
- Media type: Print (hardcover)
- Pages: 352

The Wayward Bus is a novel by American author John Steinbeck, published in 1947. The novel's epigraph is a passage from the 15th-century English play Everyman, with its archaic English intact; the quotation refers to the transitory nature of humanity. Although considered one of Steinbeck's weaker novels at the time of its original publication, The Wayward Bus was financially more successful than any of his previous works.

Steinbeck dedicated this novel to "Gwyn", thought to be a reference to his second wife, Gwyndolyn Conger. The couple divorced less than a year after the book was published.

== Plot summary ==
No single character dominates The Wayward Bus. The viewpoint shifts frequently from one character to another, often taking the form of internal monologue so that we are experiencing a given character's thoughts. Much of the novel's length is simply devoted to establishing and delineating the various characters.

This novel takes place firmly within the "Steinbeck country" of California's Salinas Valley (although the three primary locations described are all fictional): most of the narrative occurs at Rebel Corners, a crossroads 42 miles south of a San Ysidro, California that is described as being north of Los Angeles. Juan Chicoy (half-Mexican, half-Irish) maintains a small bus, nicknamed "Sweetheart". He earns his living as a mechanic, and by ferrying passengers between Rebel Corners and San Juan de la Cruz. The larger Greyhound Bus Company serves both of those locations on separate routes, but does not have service connecting the two.

Juan and his wife Alice also own a small lunch counter at Rebel Corners. The Chicoys supplement their income by selling food, coffee and candy to people who pass through on the bus route. Rebel Corners is such an obscure place that nobody actually lives there except for the Chicoys and their employees. Alice is devoted to her marriage but is in all other ways a deeply unhappy woman, who despises and distrusts all other women.

The Chicoys have two employees: one is a teenager named Ed Carson, who works as Juan's assistant mechanic and general helper. Carson claims to be descended from the famous frontiersman Kit Carson, and he wants to be called "Kit", but he is usually called "Pimples" because of his extreme facial acne. Pimples Carson (as he is identified through most of the novel) is constantly helping himself to cake or candy from the lunch counter, telling Alice to deduct it from his wages. Alice, deeply suspicious of everyone but her husband, asserts that Carson's "tab" for the food and sweets he consumes has exceeded what her husband is paying him; she also accuses Carson of stealing food.

The lunch counter's other employee is Norma, a young waitress. Because of Alice's bad temper and misogyny, waitresses tend not to last long at Rebel Corners: Norma is merely the latest in a long series of waitresses. Norma is obsessed with film star Clark Gable. She writes long fan letters to Gable which she mails to him at his studio Metro-Goldwyn-Mayer, but these are never answered. Norma maintains a semi-paranoid delusion that there is an employee at MGM who maliciously intercepts Norma's letters so that Gable will never find out she is in love with him. At one point, Norma claims to be Gable's cousin.

A family of three, on vacation, have been forced to spend the night at Rebel Corners because the bus, named "Sweetheart", needed repair. Juan, Alice, Norma and Pimples gave up their beds to the travelers and spend the night sitting up in the diner. The family now hopes to travel to San Juan on Juan Chicoy's bus: these are self-important businessman Elliott Pritchard, his wife Bernice and their daughter Mildred, a college student. The novel's description of Mr. Pritchard is an example of Steinbeck's concise character delineation: "One night a week he played poker with men so exactly like himself that the game was fairly even, and from this fact his group was convinced that they were very fine poker players."

Two more transients are waiting for the bus. One of these is Ernest Horton, a traveling salesman for a novelties company. Horton makes a very colorful entrance in this novel: he limps into the lunch counter, claiming to have injured his foot in a road accident. He then takes off his shoe, revealing a bloody sock. He removes the sock, exposing a badly maimed foot. As soon as this gets the desired response, Horton peels off the "injury": it's actually one of the gag novelties made by his company. Horton is a frustrated man who hopes to launch one or more of his many get-rich ideas, but lacks the funding to put them into practice. His favored project is a kit for men who cannot afford formal attire: a set of satin lapels and satin trouser stripes that can convert a black business suit into a tuxedo.

The other transient is a young blonde woman whose face and curvaceous figure attracts male attention. This woman's real name is never disclosed: she is always passing through somewhere on the way to somewhere else, and so she uses a series of false names in her encounters with men she never expects to meet again. Shortly after she arrives at Rebel Corners, she sees an advertisement for Camel cigarettes near an oak tree, so she introduces herself as Camille Oaks. (She is identified by this alias through the rest of the novel.) Later, seeing an advertisement that reads "Chesterfields: They Satisfy", she claims to be a dental nurse employed by Dr. T.S. Chesterfield. In fact, she is a stripper who earns her living performing at stag functions. Camille has a low opinion of men, possibly stemming from the type of men she meets. She respects the very few men who are honest enough to offer her a sexual proposition right away, but she has no patience for the men who more typically waste her time by trying to be "friends" with her, and who only gradually reveal their true intent.

One chapter of the novel is a sympathetic depiction of George, a low-paid Negro who works as a "swamper" at the Greyhound bus depot, cleaning the buses and retrieving lost property. George finds a wallet containing $100, a windfall by his standards. He schemes to keep the money, but is seen handling the wallet by another employee. Louie, a white bus driver, returns the wallet to its owner, promising to split any reward money evenly with George. Louie receives a decent reward but then cheats George, telling him that the owner's reward was only a dollar ... all of which Louie "generously" gives to George. As George never interacts with the characters at Rebel Corners, it is interesting that Steinbeck made room for this vignette which is irrelevant to the main narrative.

Very little actually happens in The Wayward Bus. Norma discovers Alice reading her letter to Clark Gable and after a lifetime of mistreatment she stands up for herself by quietly packing her cardboard suitcase. Ignoring Alice's defense, Norma collects some money from the register and walks out to board Sweetheart for the next trip to San Juan.

Juan has made this bus run many times, and he is bored with the dull routine. This time, however, the heavy rain that has fallen makes a bridge unsafe, and so he asks the passengers to decide whether to return to Rebel Corners or attempt to reach their destination via an old dirt road. They choose the road. En route, he deliberately runs the bus into a ditch, telling the passengers it was an accident. The symbolism here is, by Steinbeck's standards, unusually heavy-handed: Juan, whose life is trapped in a figurative rut, escapes it by driving into a literal rut.

The "accident" has temporarily stranded Juan and his passengers in a remote area. While they are waiting for Juan to seek help on foot, a walk of four miles, Pritchard engages Camille in conversation and expresses interest in helping her in her "career": she recognizes this as the opening gambit of a seduction, and she turns him down venomously. Pritchard assaults his own wife, partly in anger at her and partly to regain his self-importance after Camille's rejection.

Juan, who has no intention of returning to the bus, plans to escape his life and marriage by returning to Mexico. He soon walks off the road to seek shelter in a deserted farmhouse, where he falls asleep in a barn. Pritchard's daughter Mildred, strongly attracted to Juan already, follows him, and they have sex. When they return to the stranded bus, Juan extricates it from the ditch. Eventually Juan and Mildred return, the bus is driven out of the rut, and everyone gets back on. The novel ends with San Juan de la Cruz visible in the distance. The movie ends with Mrs. Chicoy catching up to the bus in San Juan and paying the little waitress what she owes her. She and her husband get back together again. The blonde goes off with the salesman. Everybody lives happily ever after.

== Adaptations ==
A film version of The Wayward Bus was released in 1957, with a cast including Jayne Mansfield, Joan Collins, Dan Dailey and Rick Jason. Much of the dramatic action in Steinbeck's novel consists of internal monologues, which the film version does not render. The movie was released in May 1957 at the height of Mansfield's popularity and enjoyed some box office success despite middling reviews.

== Notes ==
1. The epigraph being "I pray you all gyve audyence / And here this mater with reverence / By fygure a morall playe; / The somonynge of Everyman called it is / That of our lyves and endynge shewes / How transytory we be all daye", which translates approximately to "I pray you all give your attention, and hear this matter with reverence: a moral play presented in symbolic form. It is called The Summoning of Everyman, and it tells of our lives and their endings, and how transient are our days."
