= Merry Anders =

American actress (1934–2012)

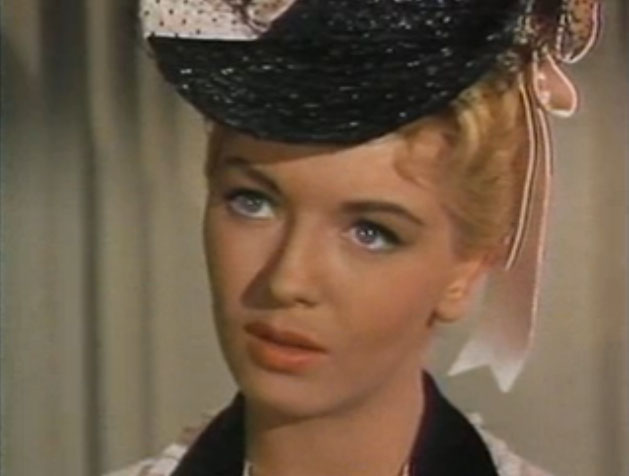
- Anders on Bonanza (1960)
- Born: Mary Helen Anderson; May 22, 1934; Chicago, Illinois, U.S.
- Died: October 28, 2012 (aged 78); Encino, California, U.S.
- Other name: Merry A. Benedict
- Occupation: Actress
- Years active: 1951–1971
- Spouses: John Stephens (m. 1955; div. 1956) Richard Benedict (m. 1986; died 1999)
- Children: 1

Merry Anders (born Mary Helen Anderson; May 22, 1934 – October 28, 2012) was an American actress who appeared in a number of television programs and films from the 1950s until her retirement from the screen in 1972.

== Early life ==
Anders was born in Chicago in 1934, the only child of Charles, a contractor, and Helen Anderson. Anders was of German, Irish and Swedish descent. In 1949, Anders and her mother visited Los Angeles for two weeks. They decided to remain in Los Angeles permanently while Charles Anderson remained in Chicago. While she was a student at John Burroughs Middle School, Anders met former actress Rita Leroy who encouraged her to begin a modeling career. While working as a junior model, Anders began studying acting at the Ben Bard Playhouse. It was there that a talent scout from 20th Century Fox spotted her and signed her to a film contract in 1951.

== Career ==
Anders made her film debut in the 1951 musical Golden Girl. For the next two years, she appeared in small and supporting roles in several 20th Century Fox films. In 1954, Fox dropped her. Later that year, Anders joined the cast of The Stu Erwin Show. She remained with the series until its cancellation in 1955. Anders was then cast in the CBS sitcom It's Always Jan, starring Janis Paige. That series was canceled after one season.

Shortly after the birth of her daughter in 1956, Anders took over the role of "Rita Marlowe" (popularized by Jayne Mansfield) in the West Coast touring production of the Broadway hit Will Success Spoil Rock Hunter?. In 1957, Anders had a much-publicized leading role in Paramount Pictures film Hear Me Good, opposite Hal March. She starred in four low-budget films that same year, The Dalton Girls, Calypso Heat Wave, The Night Runner and Escape from San Quentin.

Also in 1957, Anders landed the role of Mike McCall in the NTA Film Network and syndicated sitcom How to Marry a Millionaire. The series was based on the hit 1953 film of the same name (in which Anders appeared in a bit role) starring Betty Grable, Marilyn Monroe, and Lauren Bacall. Anders co-starred in the series with Barbara Eden and Lori Nelson. The first season of How to Marry a Millionaire was fairly successful and it was renewed for a second, abbreviated season. It was cancelled in 1959.

During the early to mid 1960s, Anders continued her career with mainly supporting film roles and guest spots on television. In 1960, she appeared in the horror film The Hypnotic Eye followed by a role in the Western Young Jesse James. Anders went on to land guest roles on Surfside 6, Alfred Hitchcock Presents, Hawaiian Eye, Death Valley Days, 77 Sunset Strip, and Perry Mason. In 1962 Anders appeared as Ruth Graham/Fay Pierce on Cheyenne in the episode titled "The Long Rope." She also appeared on The Addams Family as a cosmetics salesperson ("Fester's Punctured Romance").

In 1962, Anders was cast in the first English-language live action film adaptation of the 18th-century French fairy tale Beauty and the Beast. She was one of the scientists who travelled through time in The Time Travelers, a 1964 American science fiction film directed by Ib Melchior.

In 1965, she appeared opposite Elvis Presley in the musical comedy Tickle Me. The following year, she appeared in the recurring role of "Alice" in the teen soap opera Never Too Young. Later that year, Anders had a supporting role in the B movie Women of the Prehistoric Planet.

From 1967 to 1968, she appeared in seven episodes of Jack Webb's Dragnet series on NBC, in which she played policewoman Dorothy Miller. She appeared in a recurring role on Lassie.

By the late 1960s, Anders' acting career had begun to wane. In 1968, she appeared as uncredited "glorified extra" in the film Airport (1970). To supplement her income between acting jobs, Anders took a job as a receptionist at Litton Industries. Her final acting role was a guest spot in the two-part Gunsmoke episode "Waste", which aired late September and early October 1971.

Anders retired from acting in 1972 in order to "live a normal life." She eventually became a customer relations coordinator at Litton Industries, where she remained until her retirement in 1994.

== Personal life ==
On March 25, 1955, Anders married producer John Stephens. They separated on July 12, 1955. Two weeks later, she discovered she was pregnant with the couple's first child. Their daughter, Tina Beth Paige Anders, was born in March 1956. Anders and Stephens were divorced in June 1956. In 1986, Anders married engineer Richard Benedict; the couple remained married until his death in 1999.

On October 28, 2012, Anders died in Encino, California, aged 78, from undisclosed causes.

== Filmography ==
Film
Year	Title	Role	Notes
1951	Golden Girl	Chorine	Uncredited
1952	Belles on Their Toes	Student / Graduate	Uncredited
1952	Wait till the Sun Shines, Nellie	Adeline Halper / Adeline Burdge	Uncredited
1952	Les Misérables	Cicely	Uncredited
1953	Titanic	College Girl	Uncredited
1953	The Farmer Takes a Wife	Hannah	
1953	How to Marry a Millionaire	Model	Uncredited
1954	Three Coins in the Fountain	Girl	Uncredited
1954	Princess of the Nile	Handmaiden	
1954	Phffft!	Marsha	Uncredited
1955	All That Heaven Allows	Mary Ann	
1957	The Night Runner	Amy Hansen	
1957	Desk Set	Cathy	
1957	Calypso Heat Wave	Marti Collins	
1957	No Time to Be Young	Gloria Stuben	
1957	Escape from San Quentin	Robbie	
1957	Death in Small Doses	Amy "Miss Diesel of 1958" Phillips	
1957	Hear Me Good	Ruth Collins	
1957	The Dalton Girls	Holly Dalton	
1958	Violent Road	Carrie, The Girl in the Convertible	
1960	The Hypnotic Eye	Dodie Wilson	
1960	Five Bold Women	Missouri Lady Ellen Downs	
1960	Young Jesse James	Belle Starr	
1960	The Walking Target	Susan Mallory	
1960	Spring Affair	Dorothy	
1961	The Police Dog Story	Terry Dayton	
1961	The Gambler Wore a Gun	Sharon Donovan	
1961	When the Clock Strikes	Ellie	
1961	20,000 Eyes	Karen Walker	
1961	Secret of Deep Harbor	Janey Fowler	
1962	Patty	Mary	Alternative titles: The Shame of Patty Smith; Doctor Please Help Me; Gang Rape
1962	Beauty and the Beast	Sybil	
1962	Air Patrol	Mona Whitney	
1963	FBI Code 98	Grace McLean	
1963	House of the Damned	Nancy Campbell	
1963	Police Nurse	Joan Olson	
1964	A Tiger Walks	Betty Collins	
1964	The Quick Gun	Helen Reed	
1964	The Time Travelers	Carol White	
1964	Young Fury	Alice	
1964	Raiders from Beneath the Sea	Dottie Harper	
1965	Tickle Me	Estelle Penfield	
1966	Women of the Prehistoric Planet	Lieutenant Karen Lamont	
1970	Airport	Mrs. Burt Ball, Passenger	Uncredited
1971	Will to Die	Laura Dean	Alternative titles: Legacy of Blood; Blood Legacy

Television
Year	Title	Role	Notes
1954	The Public Defender	Agnes Fay	Season 1 Episode 26: "The Last Appeal"
1954	The Ford Television Theatre	Phoebe Dinsmore	Season 2 Episode 37: "The Mason-Dixon Line"
1954	The Ford Television Theatre	Marlene	Season 3 Episode 12: "Slide, Darling, Slide"
1954–1955	The Stu Erwin Show	Joyce Erwin	26 episodes
1955	TV Reader's Digest	Sally	Season 1 Episode 14: "Honeymoon in Mexico"
1955	The Loretta Young Show	Angela	Season 2 Episode 32: "He Always Comes Home"
1955	It's Always Jan	Val Marlowe	Season 1 Episode 1: "The Four of Us"
1955	It's Always Jan	Val Marlowe	Season 1 Episode 2: "Child Actress"
1955	It's Always Jan	Val Marlowe	Season 1 Episode 6: "Playboy"
1955	It's Always Jan	Val Marlowe	Season 1 Episode 7: "Stanley's Trip"
1955	It's Always Jan	Val Marlowe	Season 1 Episode 8: "Special Material"
1956	It's Always Jan	Val Marlowe	Season 1 Episode 15: "Housekeeper"
1956	The Millionaire	Helen Forrester	Season 3 Episode 11: "The Jay Powers Story"
1957	Broken Arrow	Amy Breece	Season 2 Episode 11: "Smoke Signal"
1957	Sugarfoot	Katie Brannigan	Season 1 Episode 1: "Brannigan's Boots"
1957	Cheyenne	Sherry Raven	Season 2 Episode 14: "Big Ghost Basin"
1957–1959	How to Marry a Millionaire	Mike McCall	52 episodes
1958	Decision	Lucy Hamilton	Season 1 Episode 13: "Man on a Raft"
1958	77 Sunset Strip	Marcia Frome	Season 1 Episode 7: "All Our Yesterdays"
1959	Sugarfoot	Sally Ormand	Season 3 Episode 6: "Outlaw Island"
1959	State Trooper	Mrs. Wallace	Season 3 Episode 7: "The Case of the Barefoot Girl"
1959	Mickey Spillane's Mike Hammer	Harriet Britton	Season 2 Episode 16: "Swing Low, Sweet Harriet"
1959	Tales of Wells Fargo	Laurie Hammer	Season 3 Episode 33: "The Tall Texan"
1959	The Ann Sothern Show	Myrna	Season 2 Episode 2: "Katy and the Cowboy"
1959	Richard Diamond, Private Detective	Claudia Reed	Season 3 Episode 21: "Bookie"
1959	The Real McCoys	Miss McLean	Season 3 Episode 20: "The Lawsuit"
1960	Cheyenne	Ruth Graham / Fay Pierce	Season 5 Episode 1: "The Long Rope"
1960	Bonanza	Virginia Keith	Season 1 Episode 29: "Bitter Water"
1960	Bronco	Francy Owens	Season 2 Episode 19: "Winter Kill"
1960	The Case of the Dangerous Robin	Annette Du Blanc	Season 1 Episode 3: "On Consignment"
1960	Maverick	Penelope Greeley	Season 3 Episode 21: "The People's Friend"
1960	Maverick	Maggie Bradford	Season 4 Episode 3: "The Town That Wasn't There"
1960	Maverick	Marybelle McCall	Season 4 Episode 15: "Destination Devil's Flat"
1960	Hawaiian Eye	Lisa Barton	Season 1 Episode 19: "Hong Kong Passage"
1961	Hawaiian Eye	Kitty Todd	Season 2 Episode 29: "Don't Kiss Me Goodbye"
1961	Hawaiian Eye	Maxine Wheaton	Season 3 Episode 6: "Pill in the Box"
1961	77 Sunset Strip	Lorrie Lambers	Season 3 Episode 24: "Face in the Window"
1961	77 Sunset Strip		Season 3 Episode 25: "Tiger by the Tail"
1961	77 Sunset Strip	Lally Embry	Season 4 Episode 5: "The Lady Has the Answers"
1961	Maverick	Cissie Anderson	Season 5 Episode 4: "Three Queens Full"
1961	The Loretta Young Show	Lenore Cooper	Season 8 Episode 14: "Enter at Your Own Risk"
1961	Bronco	Lucy Follett	Season 3 Episode 4: "Ordeal at Dead Tree"
1961	Surfside 6	Chris Karns	Season 1 Episode 17: "Yesterday's Hero"
1961	The Case of the Dangerous Robin		Season 1 Episode 24: "The Deadly Impersonation"
1961	Bringing Up Buddy	Diane Mitchell	Season 1 Episode 25: "Buddy and the Amazon"
1961	Michael Shayne	Ginger Dennis	Season 1 Episode 32: "Dead Air"
1961	Alfred Hitchcock Presents	Lena	Season 7 Episode 3: "Maria"
1961	The New Bob Cummings Show		Season 1 Episode 4: "The Ox-Tail Incident"
1961	Ichabod and Me	Leona 'Red' Smith	Season 1 Episode 12: "Benjie's Spots"
1961	Ichabod and Me	Leona	Season 1 Episode 14: "Bob's Redhead"
1961	Perry Mason	Adele Bentley	Season 4 Episode 19: "The Case of the Blind Man's Bluff"
1962	Perry Mason	Sadie Hepner	Season 5 Episode 19: "The Case of the Glamorous Ghost"
1962	77 Sunset Strip	Mary O'Neil	Season 5 Episode 11: "The Odds on Odette"
1962	Hawaiian Eye	Gloria Burns	Season 3 Episode 38: "Koko Kate"
1962	Straightaway	Barbara	Season 1 Episode 20: "Tiger by the Tail"
1963	The Jack Benny Program	Kidnapper aka Florence Nightingale	Season 13 Episode 24: "Jack Is Kidnapped"
1963	The Joey Bishop Show	Leslie Medford Wallingford	Season 2 Episode 19: "Freddie Goes Highbrow"
1964	The Joey Bishop Show	Barbara	Season 3 Episode 13: "Jack Carter Helps Joey Propose"
1964	Perry Mason	Joyce Carlton	Season 7 Episode 22: "The Case of the Garrulous Go-Between"
1964	Arrest and Trial	Joyce	Season 1 Episode 15: "Funny Man with a Monkey"
1964	Arrest and Trial	Joyce	Season 1 Episode 21: "The Best There Is"
1964	The Virginian	Donna Durrell	Season 2 Episode 30: "A Man Called Kane"
1964	The Addams Family	Miss Carver	Season 1 Episode 3: "Fester's Punctured Romance"
1966	Get Smart	Joanna Sloan	Season 1 Episode 20: "All in the Mind"
1966	Never Too Young	Alice	93 episodes
1967	Lassie	Carol Dawson	Season 14 Episode 3: "Cry of the Wild"
1967	Lassie	Carol Dawson	Season 14 Episode 4: "The Guardian"
1967	Lassie	Carol Dawson	Season 14 Episode 4: "Starfire"
1967	Dragnet	Policewoman Dorothy Miller	Season 1 Episode 7: "The Hammer"
1967	Dragnet	Policewoman Dorothy Miller	Season 1 Episode 8: "The Candy Store Robberies"
1967	Dragnet	Policewoman Dorothy Miller	Season 1 Episode 9: "The Fur Job"
1967	Dragnet	Policewoman Dorothy Miller	Season 2 Episode 8: "The Big High"
1967	Dragnet	Policewoman Dorothy Miller	Season 2 Episode 11: "The Big Dog"
1968	Dragnet	Policewoman Dorothy Miller	Season 2 Episode 21: "The Big Clan"
1968	Dragnet	Policewoman Dorothy Miller	Season 3 Episode 2: "Juvenile: DR-05"
1968	Lassie	Ann	Season 15 Episode 2: "Burst of Freedom"
1971	Gunsmoke	Shirley	Season 17 Episode 3: "Waste: Part 1"
1971	Gunsmoke	Shirley	Season 17 Episode 4: "Waste: Part 2" (final appearance)
