= Time Limit (film) =

1957 film directed by Karl Malden

- Theatrical release poster
- Directed by: Karl Malden
- Screenplay by: Henry Denker
- Based on: Time Limit; 1956 play by Henry Denker; Ralph Berkey
- Produced by: Richard Widmark; William H. Reynolds
- Starring: Richard Widmark; Richard Basehart
- Cinematography: Sam Leavitt
- Edited by: Aaron Stell
- Music by: Fred Steiner
- Distributed by: United Artists
- Release date: October 23, 1957
- Running time: 96 minutes
- Country: United States
- Languages: English; Korean
- Box office: $1.25 million (US rentals)

Time Limit is a 1957 American legal drama film directed by Karl Malden, based on the 1956 Broadway play of the same name by Henry Denker and Ralph Berkey. The film is Malden's only directing credit; in his autobiography, Malden stated that he "preferred being a good actor to being a fairly good director."

Richard Widmark co-produced the film and stars alongside Richard Basehart, who was nominated for the BAFTA Award for Best Foreign Actor for his performance.

== Plot ==
Army Colonel William Edwards is investigating the case of Major Harry Cargill, accused of collaborating with the enemy while he and his unit were held captive in a North Korean prisoner of war camp. Cargill willingly admits his guilt and brings forth evidence that proves that he signed a germ-warfare confession and broadcast anti-American speeches over the radio, seemingly an act of treason.

It seems to be an open-and-shut case, were it not for Cargill's inexplicable refusal to defend himself. Arousing further suspicion is the fact that his collaboration immediately followed the deaths of two of his soldiers, and the unit's survivors all recite an identical, rehearsed account of those deaths. Edwards' commander, General Connors, has a strong personal interest—his son, Captain Joe Connors, was one of those who died—and presses Edwards to recommend a court-martial, but Edwards delves into the mystery, refusing to accept the facile explanations.

In the end, the shocking truth comes out. Lieutenant George Miller reveals that, after Lieutenant Harvey was killed trying to escape, the rest of the men discovered that, under torture, Captain Connors had betrayed him. Over Cargill's strong objections, they decided to execute Connors. Drawing the short straw, Miller strangled him. Subsequently, their captor, Colonel Kim, gave Cargill an ultimatum: give in, or all his men would be executed. He agreed to collaborate to save their lives.

General Connors calls his son a traitor. Cargill argues with him, stating that there must be a time limit on being a hero. He denounces the Uniform Code of Military Justice espoused by Connors for demanding too much from soldiers, but the general reminds him that, while Cargill anguished over the lives and families of 16 men, many commanders had to anguish over the effect of their orders on the lives and families of thousands.

Edwards agrees with General Connors that although Cargill acted out of a humane selflessness, Cargill's judgment was flawed. He recommends that all charges be dropped, but warns Cargill that there will be a court-martial. Edwards himself will defend Cargill.

== Cast ==
- Richard Widmark as Colonel William Edwards
- Richard Basehart as Major Harry Cargill
- Dolores Michaels as Corporal Jean Evans
- June Lockhart as Mrs. Cargill
- Carl Benton Reid as General Connors
- Martin Balsam as Sergeant First Class Baker
- Rip Torn as Lieutenant George Miller
- Khigh Dhiegh as Colonel Kim (as Kaie Deei)
- Yale Wexler as Captain Joe Connors
- Alan Dexter as Mike
- Manning Ross as Lieutenant Harvey
- Joe Di Reda as Gus (as Joe Di Rida)
- James Douglas as Steve
- Kenneth Alton as Boxer
- Jack Webster as Lieutenant Harper

== Production ==
In addition to playing the lead, Richard Widmark also co-produced Time Limit. Widmark reportedly paid $100,000 to The Theatre Guild for the film rights to the play Time Limit. It was the first picture for Widmark's independent production company, Heath Productions, Inc.

It was also his idea to have his friend and colleague, Karl Malden, direct it. In a 1988 interview about the film, Malden said, "Widmark thought I'd be good directing it, and I said 'Sure, I'd take a crack at it.' I liked what it had to say." Critics gave Malden good reviews for his first directorial effort. (It turned out to be his only directing credit, with the exception of some scenes he filmed for Delmer Daves in The Hanging Tree, released in 1959.) One reviewer praised the movie for its "taut direction and vigorous performances drawn not only from principals, but a supporting cast of promising new-comers."

The outdoor scenes on an US Army post were shot on location at Fort Jay, then an active Army post located on Governors Island, New York in early May 1957. The opening scene in the film shows Colonel Edwards walking through the island, and passing through Liggett Hall. The Korean prison camp scenes were shot at the Conejo Ranch near Agoura, California.

== Reception ==
The New York Times was approving: "Widmark...and...Malden...have every reason to be proud they took on these challenging assignments [of producing and directing]....[Widmark and Basehart] give intelligent, persuasive performances.....Carl Benton Reid is able to reveal the emotions of fatherly pride and devotion to principles....Michaels...Balsam...Torn...and Lockhart...pitch in with short but well-played portrayals. Mr. Malden's direction...is taut and knowledgable."
