= Stopover Tokyo =

1957 film by Richard L. Breen

- Theatrical poster
- Directed by: Richard L. Breen
- Written by: Richard L. Breen; Walter Reisch
- Based on: novel by John P. Marquand
- Produced by: Walter Reisch
- Starring: Robert Wagner; Joan Collins; Edmond O'Brien; Ken Scott
- Cinematography: Charles G. Clarke
- Edited by: Marjorie Fowler
- Music by: Paul Sawtell
- Color process: Color by DeLuxe
- Distributed by: 20th Century Fox
- Release date: December 26, 1957
- Running time: 100 minutes
- Country: United States
- Language: English
- Budget: $1,055,000

Stopover Tokyo is a 1957 American film noir crime film directed by Richard L. Breen and starring Robert Wagner, Joan Collins, Edmond O'Brien and Ken Scott. Filmed in Japan in CinemaScope, the film is set in Tokyo and follows a US counterintelligence agent working to foil a communist assassination plot.

The film is based very loosely on the final Mr. Moto novel by John P. Marquand. The biggest change is that Mr. Moto is entirely cut from the film.

It was the sole feature film directed by Breen, an Academy Award-winning screenwriter.

== Plot ==
US Intelligence Agent Mark Fannon (Robert Wagner) is sent to Tokyo on a routine courier mission but soon uncovers communist George Underwood's (Edmond O'Brien) plot to assassinate the American High Commissioner (Larry Keating).

While there he meets Welsh receptionist Tina Llewellyn (Joan Collins), in whom fellow agent Tony Barrett (Ken Scott) has a romantic interest. This causes animosity between the two.

An attempt is made on Mark's life in a steam room and his local contact, Nobika, is assassinated. Lt. Afumi of the Tokyo police department escorts Tina and Mark to the scene of Nobika's death and shows them a note he found in Nobika's pocket.

Mark and Tina are detained by police. Mark phones Tony in Formosa to inquire about the name of the village in which Nobika lived. Mark goes there and tries to find classified information concealed in magazines. He meets Nobika's daughter, Koko.

== Cast ==
- Robert Wagner as Mark Fannon
- Joan Collins as Tina Llewellyn
- Edmond O'Brien as George Underwood
- Ken Scott as Tony Barrett
- Larry Keating as High Commissioner
- Sarah Shelby as High Commissioner's wife
- Reiko Oyama as Koko

== Original novel ==
By 1956, it had been nearly fifteen years since Marquand had written a Moto novel. He received an offer to write one from Stuart Rose, the editor of The Saturday Evening Post, who offered Marquand $5,000 to travel to Japan and an advance of $75,000.

He decided to write a new one because "I wanted to see whether or not I was still able to write a mystery, one of the most interesting forms of literary craftsmanship, if not art, that exists."

Marquand visited Japan for a month and wrote up the story towards the end of 1956. Mr Moto was not the actual hero of the novel – that role went to secret agent John Rhyce, who is sent to Tokyo to combat a communist plot along with fellow agent Ruth Bogart.

The novel was serialized in the Post from 24 November 1956 to 12 January 1957 under the title "Rendezvous in Tokyo". The magazine's editors did not like the story's unhappy ending but Marquand insisted upon it. The novel itself was published in early 1957. It was a best seller and was, on the whole, well received, with a critic at The New York Times calling it "superlative".

The novel would later be re-issued under the titles Right You Are, Mr Moto and The Last Case of Mr Moto.

== Production ==
20th Century Fox, which made the original Moto movies starring Peter Lorre, bought the film rights to the story in March 1956, prior to publication. Sam Engel was originally going to produce and William Holden and Jennifer Jones were mentioned as possible stars.

The movie ended up being the first of a proposed series of movies from writers Richard L. Breen and Walter Reisch; Breen was to make his directorial debut and Reisch would produce. Robert Stack was meant to play the lead but refused the role because he did not want to go to Japan. Stack was suspended by the studio and the role given to Robert Wagner.

Cinematographer Charles G. Clarke made expansive use of location shooting in Kyoto, a sacred Shinto city which was only lightly bombed in World War II and taken off the nuclear bombing target list (from its original top listing) due to the efforts of Henry Stimson, who argued for the preservation of its cultural assets. <Cary, Otis>

Actor Ken Scott was injured in a scene when Edmond O'Brien shot a prop gun at him and a blank cartridge hit his face. There was no serious damage.

Fox was so impressed with ten-year-old star Reiko Oyama, the studio signed her to a long-term contract.

== Reception ==
Collins and Wagner promoted the film with a nationwide publicity tour. However, it was not particularly successful at the box office.

The Chicago Tribune review praised the location photography but said the film "starts suspensefully, but ends limply." The Los Angeles Times liked the scenery which it thought "helps overcome somewhat routine plot development" but felt Wagner "goes about his spying work energetically although it is thought that this type of character isn't exactly his cup of tea."

Breen and Resich were later reported as working on another film for Wagner, The Far Alert, about NATO naval flyers. However, this film was never made.

A year after the movie came out Marquand told The New York Times that:

Mr Moto was my literary disgrace. I wrote about him to get shoes for the baby. I don't say I didn't have a pleasant time writing about him and he returned in Stopover Tokyo but I don't think I'll ever meet him again. Moto was an entirely different piece of writing from a so-called serious novel. He really became famous when they took him up in the movies. In book form he has never really sold well – never more than 5,000 to 6,000 copies. I can't say why people remember him, except they must remember the serials and pictures.

In 1959, Wagner disparaged the film:

When I started at Fox in 1950 they were making sixty five pictures a year. Now they're lucky if they make thirty. There was a chance to get some training in B pictures. Then TV struck. Everything went big and they started sticking me into Cinemascope spectacles. One day, smiling Joe Juvenile with no talent was doing a role intended for John Wayne. That was in a dog called Stopover Tokyo. I've really had to work to keep up.
