= Police Nurse =

1963 film by Maury Dexter

- Theatrical release poster
- Directed by: Maury Dexter
- Screenplay by: Harry Spalding
- Produced by: Maury Dexter
- Starring: Ken Scott; Merry Anders; Oscar Beregi (Jr.); Barbara Mansell; John Holland; Byron Morrow
- Cinematography: John M. Nickolaus, Jr.
- Edited by: Richard Einfeld
- Music by: Richard LaSalle
- Production company: Associated Producers Inc
- Distributed by: 20th Century Fox
- Release date: May 1963
- Running time: 64 minutes
- Country: United States
- Language: English

Police Nurse is a 1963 American drama film directed by Maury Dexter and written by Harry Spalding. The film stars Ken Scott, Merry Anders, Oscar Beregi (Jr.), Barbara Mansell, John Holland and Byron Morrow. The film was released in May 1963, by 20th Century Fox.

== Cast ==
- Ken Scott as Art Devlin
- Merry Anders as Joan Olson
- Oscar Beregi (Jr.) as Dr. Leon Claudel
- Barbara Mansell as Irene Kersey
- John Holland as Edward Mayhall
- Byron Morrow as Capt. Pete Ingersoll
- Ivan Bonar as Dr. C. F. Sears
- Jerry Murray as Terry
- Justin Smith as Pharmacist
- Carol Brewster as Mrs. Mayhall

== Production ==
Dexter says the film's title was an idea of Robert L. Lippert who asked Spalding to write a story to suit it. Dexter later wrote "the only problem was... there never was a capacity for a nurse in the police department. We shot the film anyway."

Filming took place in January 1963.
