= Raiders from Beneath the Sea =

1964 film by Maury Dexter

- Theatrical release poster
- Directed by: Maury Dexter
- Screenplay by: Harry Spalding
- Story by: F. Paul Hall
- Produced by: Maury Dexter
- Starring: Ken Scott; Merry Anders; Russ Bender
- Cinematography: Floyd Crosby
- Edited by: Carl Pierson
- Music by: Hank Levine
- Production companies: Lippert Pictures; Associated Producers Incorporated
- Distributed by: 20th Century Fox
- Release date: December 12, 1964
- Running time: 73 minutes
- Country: United States
- Language: English

Raiders from Beneath the Sea is a 1964 American adventure film directed by Maury Dexter and starring Ken Scott and Merry Anders. It was written by Harry Spalding from a story by F. Paul Hall.

== Plot ==
A down-on-his-luck California apartment house manager hatches a plan to rob a Catalina Island bank, and escape with his accomplices using scuba gear.

== Cast ==
- Ken Scott as Bill Harper
- Merry Anders as Dottie Harper
- Russ Bender as Tucker
- Booth Colman as Purdy
- Garth Benton as Buddy
- Bruce Anson as policeman #1
- Walter Maslow as policeman #2
- Stacey Winters as bank teller
- Ray Dannis as Bowman
- Larry Barton as bank manager
- Roger Creed as bank guard

== Reception ==
Boxoffice wrote: "Producer-director Maury Dexter, working spiritedly from a Harry Spalding screenplay (and this fellow turns out scripts at an astonishing pace), has guided leading players Ken Scott and Merry Anders plus featured roster with some nicely inventive touches. Floyd Crosby's photographic effects, particularly at sca, are to be commended for obvious effort to stray from the tried-and-true water footage. As a disgruntled ex-diver out to make a tremendous killing, over the voluble protestation of beauteous spouse Miss Anders, Scott conveys an admixture of forceful adventurer and little-chap-against-the-world. More discriminating viewers will poke logical holes through the Spalding script and the Dexter direction."
