= The Day Mars Invaded Earth =

1963 film by Maury Dexter

- Theatrical release poster
- Directed by: Maury Dexter
- Written by: Harry Spalding
- Produced by: Maury Dexter
- Starring: Kent Taylor; Marie Windsor; William Mims
- Cinematography: John M. Nickolaus, Jr.
- Edited by: Jodie Copelan
- Music by: Richard LaSalle
- Production company: Associated Producers, Inc.
- Distributed by: Twentieth Century Fox
- Release date: February 14, 1963
- Running time: 70 minutes
- Country: United States
- Language: English

The Day Mars Invaded Earth (a.k.a. Spaceraid 63) is a 1963 American independently made 1963 black-and-white CinemaScope science fiction film, produced and directed by Maury Dexter, starring Kent Taylor, Marie Windsor, and William Mims. It was written by Harry Spalding and released by Twentieth Century Fox.

In the film Martian energy beings duplicate a scientist and his family as a first step toward their invasion of Earth to stop humanity's space programs.

== Plot ==
NASA successfully lands a robotic surveyor on Mars. The rover begins to explore, but after just a few minutes it is completely destroyed by what appears to be a high energy surge. At exactly the same instant back at mission control, Dr. Dave Fielding, in charge of the project, suddenly feels oddly disconnected and not himself; he shakes it off and then goes to face the crowd of expectant reporters. Right after he leaves, his exact body double is sitting at his desk.

Dave then leaves for a vacation and flies to California to be with his family; they are now staying in the guest house of a lavish mansion belonging to his wife's family. His children, 10 year-old Rocky and teen Judi, are very happy to see him, but it is very clear that his marriage to Claire is in trouble because of the time he must spend away from his family. At first, the tensions between Dave and Claire make it less obvious that they are seeing their body doubles walking around the estate. Eventually, though, as things turn strange, the whole family suspects something is wrong and pulls together. They soon discover they are trapped, unable to leave the isolated estate due to a malfunctioning main gate.

Dave then encounters his body double in the mansion's main house. The duplicate Dave informs him that Mars is inhabited and that all Martians are beings without any physical bodies, an energy-like intelligence. They traveled to Earth via the Martian probe's high-gain, two-way radio transmitter, destroying the robotic rover in the process. Now on Earth, the Martians plan to replace key humans with duplicates to quash any further Earth missions to Mars. Since Dave's wife and children would likely recognize a duplicate, they had to be replaced, too.

Dr. Fielding’s Scientist colleague and family friend Web Spencer arrives at the estate and made aware of the situation. Web tries to help everyone escape and finally gets the main gate open, but on his way back, the Martian-Dave reduces Web to ash.

Later, "Dave and his family" appear to get into a car and leave the estate, with a Martian-Web duplicate behind the wheel. As they drive past the estate's empty swimming pool, five distinct body shapes of piled ash can be seen on the concrete bottom. The pool's water jets then turn on, slowly washing the ashes away.

== Cast ==
- Kent Taylor as Dr. David Fielding
- Marie Windsor as Claire Fielding
- William Mims as Dr. Web Spencer
- Betty Beall as Judi Fielding
- Lowell Brown as Frank Hazard
- Gregg Shank as Rocky Fielding
- Henrietta Moore as Mrs. Moore
- Troy Melton as police officer
- George Riley as cab driver

== Production ==
The Day Mars Invaded Earth was shot at the historic Greystone Mansion. It was the second script ever written by Harry Spalding.

Director Dexter said that Associated Producers' Robert L. Lippert insisted that Marie Windsor be cast in the film.

Dexter later said the film's title came from Lippert and was meant to evoke memories of Fox's 1951 classic The Day the Earth Stood Still.

Dexter called it "a nice little film".

== Release ==
The Day Mars Invaded Earth was released as the bottom half of a double feature with the Elvis Presley film Kissin' Cousins.

== Reception ==
The Monthly Film Bulletin wrote: "This modest slice of science fiction hokum is neither a full-scale spectacle-invasion (a la War of the Worlds), nor a variation on the monster theme. It is, in fact, primarily an essay in the macabre, which achieves its effects mainly by suggestion and by having the leading players doubling their roles as the sinister Martian manifestations. Confident expectations that the heroes will, as usual, resolve their problem and win out, are confounded by the sudden, surprising, shock ending."

Kine Weekly wrote: "There are no fancy technical gimmicks, but competent acting against an impressive country estate backdrop lends some validity to the extravagant plot and, at the same time, cultivates an essential atmosphere of mystery. ... The picture, unlike traditional science fiction stuff, eschews technical props, yet subtly plays on the audience's imagination. Kent Taylor is sound as the perplexed Fielding, Marie Windsor strengthens feminine interest as Claire, and William Mims makes an amiable and rugged Web. The rest, too, are adequate."

Boxoffice wrote: "The premise is put forth with a minimum of frills in light of the skimpy running time and the acknowledged science-fiction fans assembled to gaze lingeringly upon the chase-and-effect, as acted out by Kent Taylor, Marie Windsor and William Mims, may well be disappointed. ... Acting values, as such, aren't particularly distinguished. The audience for which this has been obviously assembled won't find much to quibble about."

Howard Thompson in The New York Times wrote: "This pallid, pint-sized exercise starts out with a scientist and his little family vacationing on a huge California estate after he has supervised a rocket landing on Mars. At least, we're told he has. Then the family begins seeing spots and double images, to spook music. This took 40 minutes, before one viewer came back to earth, retreating. The picture also traditionally wastes one of Hollywood's low-budget queens, the gifted Marie Windsor".

== Home media ==
The Day Mars Invaded Earth was released on DVD March 19, 2015 by Fox Cinema Archives. Originally shot and released in CinemaScope (2:35:1), the DVD's transfer was instead made from a letterboxed 4:3 master, rather than from a high-definition or standard definition 16:9 widescreen master.

== See also ==
- List of American films of 1963
