= The Murder Game (1965 film) =

British film by Sidney Salkow

- Theatrical release poster
- Directed by: Sidney Salkow
- Written by: Harry Spalding
- Based on: story by Irving Yergin
- Produced by: Robert L. Lippert; Jack Parsons
- Starring: Ken Scott; Marla Landi; Trader Faulkner; Conrad Phillips; Gerald Sim; Duncan Lamont
- Cinematography: Geoffrey Faithfull
- Edited by: Robert Winter
- Music by: Carlo Martelli
- Production company: Lippert Pictures
- Distributed by: 20th Century-Fox
- Release date: December 1965 (USA)
- Running time: 76 minutes
- Country: United Kingdom
- Language: English

The Murder Game is a 1965 British crime film directed by Sidney Salkow and starring Ken Scott, Marla Landi, Trader Faulkner and Conrad Phillips. It was written by Harry Spalding based on a story by Irving Yergin. It was distributed by Twentieth Century-Fox.

It was the last film directed by Salkow.

== Plot ==
While on his honeymoon, a husband discovers the plan of his bigamous wife with her first husband to murder him for his money and he plans counter measures to throw the blame on them.

== Cast ==
- Ken Scott as Steve Baldwin
- Marla Landi as Marie Aldrich
- Trader Faulkner as Chris Aldrich
- Conrad Phillips as Peter Shanley
- Gerald Sim as Larry Landstrom
- Duncan Lamont as Inspector Telford
- Peter Bathurst as Dr. Knight
- Ballard Berkeley as Sir Colin Chalmers
- Victor Brooks as Rev Francis Hood
- Dyan Cannon
- John Dunbar as Parkhill
- Gretchen Franklin as landlady
- Clement Freud as croupier
- Jimmy Gardner as Arthur Gillett
- Rosamund Greenwood as Mrs. Potter
- Derek Partridge as Police Sergeant
- John Richmond as prosecutor
- Frank Thornton as radio announcer

== Critical reception ==
The Monthly Film Bulletin wrote: "Competent thriller, directed without frills and with a happy disregard for coincidence. The acting is efficient, if undistinguished, and the plot moves along at a pace fast enough to encompass one or two moments of suspense. But the character motivation is sketchy, and the irony of the climax laboured."

Variety wrote: "The Murder Game is a slow-paced British melodrama that is generally too wordy and lacking in punch ... does have some good moments of suspense and a fine realistic round of fisticuffs, with black and white camera work by Gerry Massey-Collier showing to advantage. Faulkner is a talented actor, who comes across as well as he can under thie circumstances, Miss Landi, an attractive brunet [sic], is convincing as the scheming wife, but the storyline is lacking in an explanation of some of her past deeds that lead her to do in her new husband. Scott is capable enough, although he seems to be playing his part in a tongue-in-cheek manner. In general, however, the film is ineffective, lacking in pace and fumbling along."
