= Fräulein (1958 film) =

1958 film by Henry Koster

- Directed by: Henry Koster
- Screenplay by: Leo Townsend
- Based on: Fräulein; 1956 novel by James McGovern
- Produced by: Walter Reisch
- Starring: Dana Wynter; Mel Ferrer; Dolores Michaels
- Cinematography: Leo Tover
- Edited by: Marjorie Fowler
- Music by: Daniele Amfitheatrof
- Color process: DeLuxe Color
- Distributed by: 20th Century Fox
- Release date: June 8, 1958
- Running time: 95 minutes
- Country: United States
- Language: English
- Budget: $1.4 million

Fräulein is a 1958 American romantic drama war film directed by Henry Koster starring Dana Wynter and Mel Ferrer as two people caught up in World War II and the aftermath. It was also released as Fraulein in CinemaScope.

== Plot ==
In Cologne near the end of World War II, American prisoner of war Foster MacLain (Mel Ferrer) escapes and is sheltered by Professor Julius Angermann (Ivan Triesault). Angermann's daughter Erika (Dana Wynter) is not so welcoming, but hides the American from the German soldiers looking for him. MacLain leaves when it is safe.

Not long afterwards, a bomb strikes the house, killing the professor. Erika goes to live in Berlin with her cousin Karl (Herbert Berghof). Karl has lodgers, Fritz and Berta Graubach (Luis van Rooten and Blandine Ebinger), who are outspoken supporters of the Nazi cause. When the Russians capture the city, Erika hides in the attic for fear of being raped. However, Berta betrays Erika's existence in order to save herself, and a drunken corporal starts up the stairs. Karl is killed trying to stop him. The Russian chases Erika out on the roof, but slips and falls to his death, and Erika is charged with his murder.

Colonel Dmitri Brikett (Theodore Bikel) is attracted to her and saves her life, though he expects a sexual reward. However, Erika manages to flee to the American-controlled sector of the city with the assistance of Lori (Dolores Michaels), a nightclub piano player. There, she runs into the Graubachs, who now claim they always opposed the Nazis. The Graubachs insist she come stay with them. She finds out later that they are running a brothel and want to employ her. She flees, but not before they have already registered her as a prostitute with the American authorities. They pursue her, but a kindly military policeman, Corporal Hanks (James Edwards), blocks them.

Meanwhile, MacLain searches for his wartime benefactors, finally finding Erika working in a nightclub. When he offers to help her, she asks him to find her fiancé Hugo (Helmut Dantine). MacLain uses his connections to locate Hugo and takes Erika to see him. However, she finds a very changed, embittered man – a crippled war veteran, who is living in a makeshift shelter with another woman, and who is not happy to see her with an American. Hugo asks Erika for the engagement ring back so he can buy an artificial arm to replace the one he lost in the war. She gives it to him and leaves.

As MacLain spends time with Erika, he falls in love with her. He asks her to marry him and move to the United States. She accepts, but when she goes to apply for a passport, she realizes that she will be turned down because of her registration as a prostitute. She is about to give up, but by chance, Corporal Hanks is the man processing the applications. Remembering the circumstances of their previous meeting, he erases her "occupation" and gives her the papers she needs.

== Cast ==
- Dana Wynter as Erika Angermann
- Mel Ferrer as Maj. Foster MacLain
- Dolores Michaels as Lori the piano player
- Margaret Hayes as Lt. Berdie Dubbin (as Maggie Hayes)
- Theodore Bikel as Col. Dmitri Bucaron
- Luis Van Rooten as Fritz Graubach
- Helmut Dantine as Lt. Hugo Von Metzler
- Herbert Berghof as Karl Angermann
- James Edwards as Cpl. S. Hanks
- Ivan Triesault as Prof. Julius Angermann
- Blandine Ebinger as Frau Berta Graubach
- Jack Kruschen as Sgt. Grischa
- John Banner as Ulick, German Health Dept.
- Dorothy Arnold as woman with Hugo (uncredited)

== Reception ==
A.H. Weiler, writing for The New York Times, described the film as "a curiously episodic adventure whose parts are far more interesting than the whole drama." Of the stars, he wrote that "Miss Wynter is an appealing, if somewhat docile, heroine", while "the quality of docility is more than marked in Mr. Ferrer", who is "on occasion, restrained to the point of apathy."
