= Escape from San Quentin =

1957 film by Fred F. Sears

- Film poster
- Directed by: Fred F. Sears
- Written by: Bernard Gordon (originally as Raymond T. Marcus)
- Produced by: Sam Katzman
- Starring: Johnny Desmond; Merry Anders; Richard Devon
- Cinematography: Benjamin H. Kline
- Edited by: Saul A. Goodkind
- Music by: Laurindo Almeida
- Color process: Black and white
- Production company: Clover Productions
- Distributed by: Columbia Pictures
- Release date: September 1957
- Running time: 81 minutes
- Country: United States
- Language: English

Escape from San Quentin is a 1957 American film noir crime film produced by Sam Katzman, directed by Fred F. Sears, and starring Johnny Desmond, Merry Anders and Richard Devon.

== Plot ==
Mike Gilbert is doing time at San Quentin prison in California. His sentence doesn't have long to go, but when fellow convict Roy Gruber plans a breakout and wants pilot Gilbert to help steal a plane and fly them out of the country, splitting $120,000 in stolen money Gruber has hidden, Gilbert goes along, having heard his wife Georgie wants a divorce.

During their escape, inmate Hap Graham tries to tag along. The plane only holds two passengers, so Gruber roughly throws Hap to the ground, injuring him. Low on fuel, the plane can make it only as far as a rural road where Gruber knocks a man unconscious and steals his truck.

Mike gets in touch with his sister-in-law Robbie, who tries and fails to get Georgie to help her husband. The money's in Los Angeles, hidden by Gruber's father, Curly. With police watching, Gruber gets a friend named Richie try to retrieve it. Hap turns up, seeking revenge, but he is killed and Richie badly hurt. Robbie comes along as the fugitives flee across the border to Tijuana. The ruthless Gruber decides to take Robbie captive and murders his friend Richie.

Mike has little choice but to help the border patrol capture his crony and rescue the girl. He saves a Mexican policeman's life in the process, which law authorities say they will take into consideration as they return Mike to jail, with Robbie promising to wait for him.

== Cast ==
- Johnny Desmond as Mike
- Merry Anders as Robbie
- Richard Devon as Roy Gruber
- Roy Engel as Hap Graham
- William Bryant as Richie (as Bill Bryant)
- Ken Christy as Curly Gruber
- Larry J. Blake as Mack
