= It's Always Jan =

American situation comedy

- Title poster, the image of Janis Paige and the phrases "Janis Paige" and "in It's Always Jan" appeared separately.
- Genre: Sitcom
- Directed by: Sheldon Leonard
- Starring: Janis Paige; Patricia Bright; Merry Anders; Jeri Lou James; Arte Johnson; Sid Melton
- Country of origin: United States
- Original language: English
- No. of seasons: 1
- No. of episodes: 26

Production
- Producer: Arthur Stander
- Running time: 30 mins. (approx)
- Production companies: Janard Productions, Inc.

Original release
- Network: CBS
- Release: September 10, 1955 – April 28, 1956

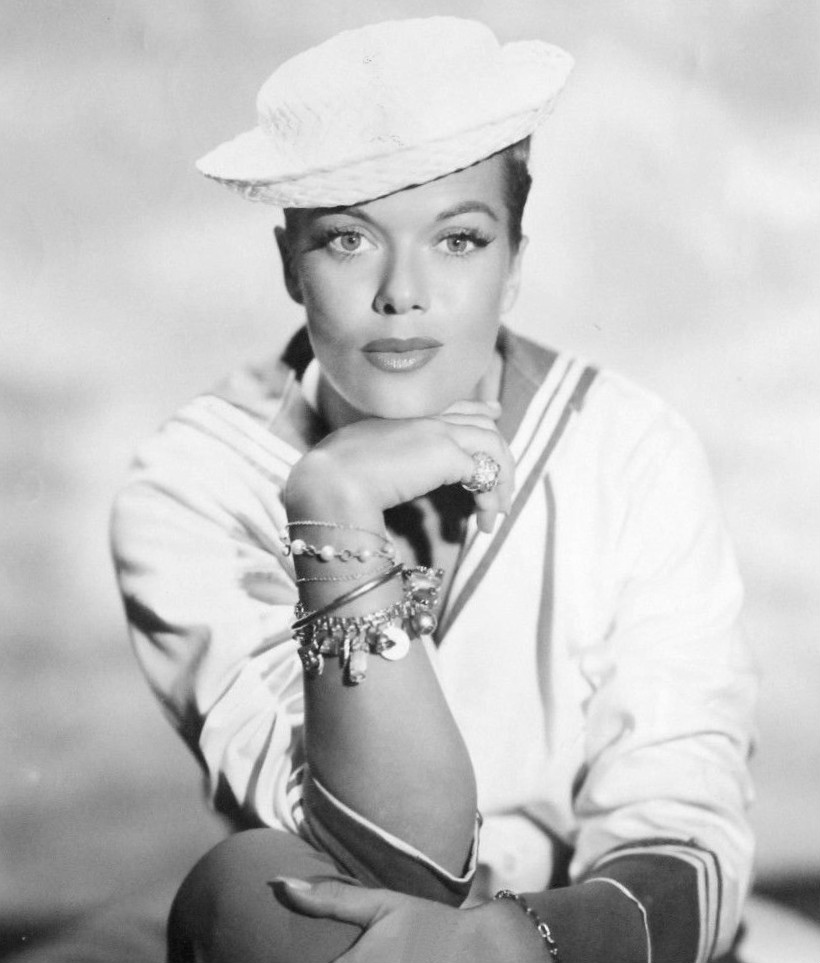
Janis Paige in a publicity photo for It's Always Jan.

It's Always Jan is an American sitcom that aired on CBS during the 1955–56 television season. The series stars Janis Paige as a widowed nightclub singer struggling to make ends meet.

== Synopsis ==
Janis Stewart is a war widow and struggling nightclub singer who lives in an apartment in New York City on the East Side of Manhattan with her 10-year-old daughter Josie. Jan faces the challenges of raising Josie as a single mother, and her finances are precarious. To help pay the rent, Jan and Josie share their small apartment with two women who are friends of Jan: Pat Murphy, a secretary for a theatrical producer, and Val Marlowe, an aspiring actress and model. Harry Cooper is Jan's longtime agent and loyal friend. Stanley Schreiber is the 20-year-old son of the man who owns the neighborhood delicatessen and works as a delivery boy there.

Jan performs regularly at Tony's Cellar, a nightclub in Manhattan. She is talented and hopes for bigger things in her career, but never gets the big break in show business she hopes for. Jan, Pat, and Val often bicker with one another over the eligible bachelors they meet and compete with one another for the men's attention.

== Cast ==
- Janis Paige as Janis "Jan" Stewart, a struggling nightclub singer
- Jeri Lou James as Josie Stewart, Janis's ten-year-old daughter
- Patricia Bright as Pat Murphy, secretary and one of Janis and Josie's roommates
- Merry Anders as Val Marlowe, aspiring actress and one of Janis and Josie's roommates
- Arte Johnson as Stanley Schreiber, delivery boy for the local delicatessen
- Sid Melton as Harry Cooper, Janis's agent

== Production ==
Desilu Productions and Janard Productions, a partnership of Janis Paige and series producer Arthur Stander, co-produced It's Always Jan. Paige sang a song in most episodes. Her Jan Stewart character's hairstyle resembled that of Lucille Ball's Lucy Ricardo character on the hit series I Love Lucy, also filmed at Desilu. Each episode ended with the Jan Stewart character turning to the camera and saying "Good night" to the television audience.

In mid-December 1955, Patricia Bright broke her right kneecap and Merry Anders had to leave the show to have a baby. Episodes were written so that Bright's Pat Murphy character could appear only while sitting down, and Anders's Val Marlowe character was temporarily written out of the series. After her baby's birth, Anders and her Val character returned to the series.

It′s Always Jan's premise bore similarities to the plots of two hit movies, 1953's How to Marry a Millionaire and 1954's Three Coins in the Fountain, both of which also featured three man-chasing women. Merry Anders, who portrayed Val Marlowe in It's Always Jan, went on to star in the 1958–1959 syndicated television series How to Marry a Millionaire.

== Reception ==
It's Always Jan proved to be somewhat popular, as Paige appeared on the cover of TV Guide magazine for the January 28, 1956 issue. The earliest known mention of the program is from a week prior to the show's premiere, stating:

"The term "situation comedy" has fallen into such disrepute even the networks now shun it. They're calling 'em 'comedy dramas.' At least, that's what CBS terms JANIS PAIGE's new show: It's Always Jan."

However, the program seems to have received a more lukewarm reception from critics. The October 15th, 1955 issue of TV Guide states:

"It's Always Jan —which presents Janis Paige in her first TV series—is worth watching, but it lacks enough novelty to lift it above the 'just another situation comedy' groove... The stories are funny enough to draw some laughs (although not as many as you’ll hear on the sound-track), and they occasionally generate genuine sympathy and affection for the characters portrayed. But the show usually catches fire only when Miss Paige, as a night club singer struggling to become a Broadway star, sings—and she does only one song a week. Otherwise, the show revolves about the problems of Jan's child - the danger of her being spoiled by the three older girls, her chances of becoming a child actress... Remember My Friend Irma? Add a third roommate and you just about have It's Always Jan."

== Broadcast history ==
It's Always Jan premiered on CBS on September 10, 1955. It lasted only a single season, and its last original episode aired on April 28, 1956. CBS broadcast reruns of It's Always Jan in prime time during 1956 from May 12 to May 26 and from June 9 to June 30. The show was broadcast from 9:30 to 10:00 p.m. Eastern Time on Saturdays throughout its prime-time run.

After It's Always Jan's CBS run ended, NBC aired reruns of the show on weekday afternoons as episodes of the network's Comedy Time series from August 12 to September 21, 1956.

== Preservation status ==
Despite its CBS and NBC reruns and the Desilu policy of recording programs for distribution to syndication, It's Always Jan never received an official home release or later run on nostalgia-based television networks such as TV Land or MeTV. As of 2024, one episode - "Guilty Conscience" - is available online in both black-and-white and colorized versions.

== Episodes ==
No.	Title	Directed by	Written by	Original release date
1	"The Four of Us"	Sheldon Leonard	Arthur Stander	September 10, 1955
Jan becomes upset about Josie′s behavior, which she believes has become too mature for Josie's age. The only solution that Jan, Pat, and Val can come up with is for Jan and Josie to move out of the apartment. During the episode, Jan sings "Carolina in the Morning".
2	"Child Actress"	Unknown	Unknown	September 17, 1955
Josie appears in a school play and likes all the attention she gets after a good performance. She decides to become a child actress, and is upset when Jan disapproves of the idea.
3	"Joe"	Unknown	Unknown	October 1, 1955
Jan finds herself falling in love with a happy-go-lucky, fun-living Irishman who reminds her of her late husband and tries to convince her that she does not need to live entirely in the past with the memory of her husband. Guest star: Darren McGavin
4	"Pat's Romance"	Unknown	Unknown	October 8, 1955
Jan's and Pat's friendship is tested when Pat brings home her boyfriend, a handsome bachelor who promptly falls for Jan. Jan is attracted to him as well. Not wanting to hurt Pat's feelings, Jan has to fight off her attraction to the man. Guest star: Elliott Reid
5	"Stanley's Love"	Unknown	Unknown	October 15, 1955
Jan is embarrassed when young Stanley announces that he is in love with her — and then unwillingly becomes involved in a love triangle when Josie develops a crush on Stanley.
6	"Playboy"	Unknown	Unknown	October 29, 1955
An excited Val is thrilled when she becomes engaged to a wealthy playboy who has been married five times — but when he starts to make romantic advances on Jan, Jan tries to break up the engagement.
7	"Stanley's Trip"	Unknown	Unknown	November 5, 1955
Feeling he has no future working at the delicatessen, Stanley decides to leave his father's business and seek adventure by taking a job in Arabia. Jan believes he is too innocent for the job, and she and her friends intervene with a plot to stop him from going.
8	"Special Material"	Unknown	Unknown	November 12, 1955
A songstress promises to write some "special material" if Jan pays her $150. Envisaging spectacular success for herself, Jan borrows money from her friends to pay the woman, but it turns out to be a trick, and Jan is in trouble when the songwriter bilks her out of the money.
9	"The Baby"	Unknown	Unknown	November 26, 1955
After angry neighbors in Jan's apartment building petition the landlord to evict a young couple with a crying baby, Jan comes to the couple's defense and uses her organizing skills to solve the problem by both quieting the infant and placating the neighbors.
10	TBA	Unknown	Unknown	December 3, 1955
Feeling that she has become too much of a burden on Jan, Josie runs away to an orphanage — so Jan turns the tables on her by visiting the orphanage and pretending that she wants to adopt another girl as a replacement for Josie.
11	"Movie Star"	Unknown	Unknown	December 10, 1955
Jan uses up her entire emergency fund to cut a demo record, leaving her friends and her feeling destitute and desperate until Harry arrives to tell her that the recording got the attention of movie producer Sidney Mansfield, who is looking for an unknown to sing one of the female leads in an upcoming musical film. Prior to Jan's office meeting with Mansfield about a possible movie deal, Pat invites Jan's friends and neighbors to see a "demonstration" of Jan as a commercial product in a leopard bikini, convincing everyone to form a corporation by "investing" $500 each in Jan's movie career. Jan spends the money on an elaborate wardrobe — only to learn that clothes do not necessarily make the woman.
12	"Propriety"	Unknown	Unknown	December 24, 1955
After complaining that all her boyfriends want to kiss her good night, Jan draws up a set of rules for her future boyfriends — and then is even more upset when her next boyfriend, Mike Allen, is happy to abide by them. Guest star: Gerald Mohr
13	"Stool Pigeon"	Unknown	Unknown	December 31, 1955
Jan impresses on Josie the importance of not betraying confidence, but after Josie brings home a young boy who wants to run away from home, Jan finds herself in a quandary over how to explain why she betrayed Josie's confidence.
14	"The Diary"	Unknown	Unknown	January 7, 1956
Not wanting to neglect Josie, Jan turns down a lucrative singing contract, but she is startled when she accidentally discovers what Josie has written in her diary.
15	"House Keeper"	Unknown	Unknown	January 21, 1956
Jan and her friends hire a young man as their housekeeper, making an enemy of every husband in the apartment building when their wives see how well the man does housework and insist that their husbands do the same.
16	"Stage Door Johnny"	Unknown	Unknown	January 28, 1956
Jan begins receiving flowers and gifts from an unknown admirer who turns out to be an elderly man who has absolutely no interest in her. Jan takes pity on the man, who sacrificed his life for his sisters.
17	"Press Release"	Unknown	Unknown	February 4, 1956
Jan is upset with Harry when he releases an item to the press saying that she is involved in a romantic relationship with a film star who she claims she has never met.
18	"The Doctor"	Unknown	Unknown	February 18, 1956
Handsome, unmarried Dr. Phillips comes to treat Josie, and all the women fall for him. Jan soon discovers that he has a romantic interest in her and that Josie, who loves Dr. Phillips, wants Jan to marry him.
19	"Guilty Conscience"	Norman Tokar	Stanley Adams	February 25, 1956
A big-time agent who is a longtime rival of Harry's sees Jan's show at the club and offers her a prize engagement if she agrees to leave Harry and sign with him. Jan fantasizes about being a star, but is torn between fame and loyalty because she thinks that signing with the agent would betray her friendship with Harry. Guest stars: Dan Tobin, Peter Leeds, Bill Meador, Roxanne Arlen
20	"Public Enemy"	Unknown	Unknown	March 3, 1956
A star rookie pitcher for the Brooklyn Dodgers falls in love with Jan and spends every evening at the nightclub where she sings. When she rejects him, he begins losing so many baseball games that he is about to be shipped back to the minor leagues, and the Dodgers' manager begs her to break her spell over him. Anxious to save the rookie's job and help Brooklyn win the pennant, Jan uses a system that all true baseball fans understand to solve the problem.
21	"Blind Date"	Unknown	Unknown	March 17, 1956
Pat mistakenly gets a call from someone named Seymour, and their chat goes so well that Jan recommends Pat go on a date with him sight unseen. The call was a wrong number, and Pat and Jan know absolutely nothing about Seymour; who he is, what he looks like, or even if he's a perfect match. When Pat gets cold feet, Jan offers to go out with the man instead so he will not be disappointed, but ultimately Pat goes on the date. She does not get home until 2:00 a.m., and only says that she had a wonderful time — realizing that he might have been a plumber who visited the apartment building earlier in the day.
22	"Love Rings Bells"	Unknown	Unknown	March 24, 1956
After Pat and Mrs. Johnston save Jan from being hit on by a creepy bar crawler and attribute Jan's lack of romantic success to her job as a nightclub singer, Jan gets fed up with dating and impulsively decides to get married, although she has no idea what she wants in a husband. Her neighbors begin sending their unattached male friends to see her, and she spends an entire day speed-dating a parade of incompatible men before she meets Howard Stone, who appears to be a perfect match. Jan and Howard never become a serious couple, but the experience reminds Jan that she still can find love years after her husband's death.
23	"Room for Rent"	Unknown	Unknown	March 31, 1956
During a nerve-wracking day, Jan and Pat have a falling out, and Pat decides to move to a different apartment — but Josie has an idea that will resolve their differences and solve the problem.
24	"Stock Deal"	Unknown	Unknown	April 14, 1956
A client gives Jan a hot stock tip on uranium, and Jan and Pat pass along the good news to all their friends and neighbors. They all fantasize about becoming overnight millionaires and how they would spend their riches. Guest stars: Kathleen Freeman and Steven Geray
25	"Stage Struck"	Unknown	Unknown	April 21, 1956
Josie is impressed by a school friend's mother who is a lawyer, viewing her as the ideal woman, so Jan takes her to the nightclub to show her that her mother is impressive at work, too.
26	"Harry Should Marry"	Unknown	Unknown	April 28, 1956
Jan, Josie, and Pat hatch a plot to get Harry married off, but their efforts to rearrange Harry's life so that he'll meet the right woman go awry.
