= Byron Morrow =

American actor (1911–2006)

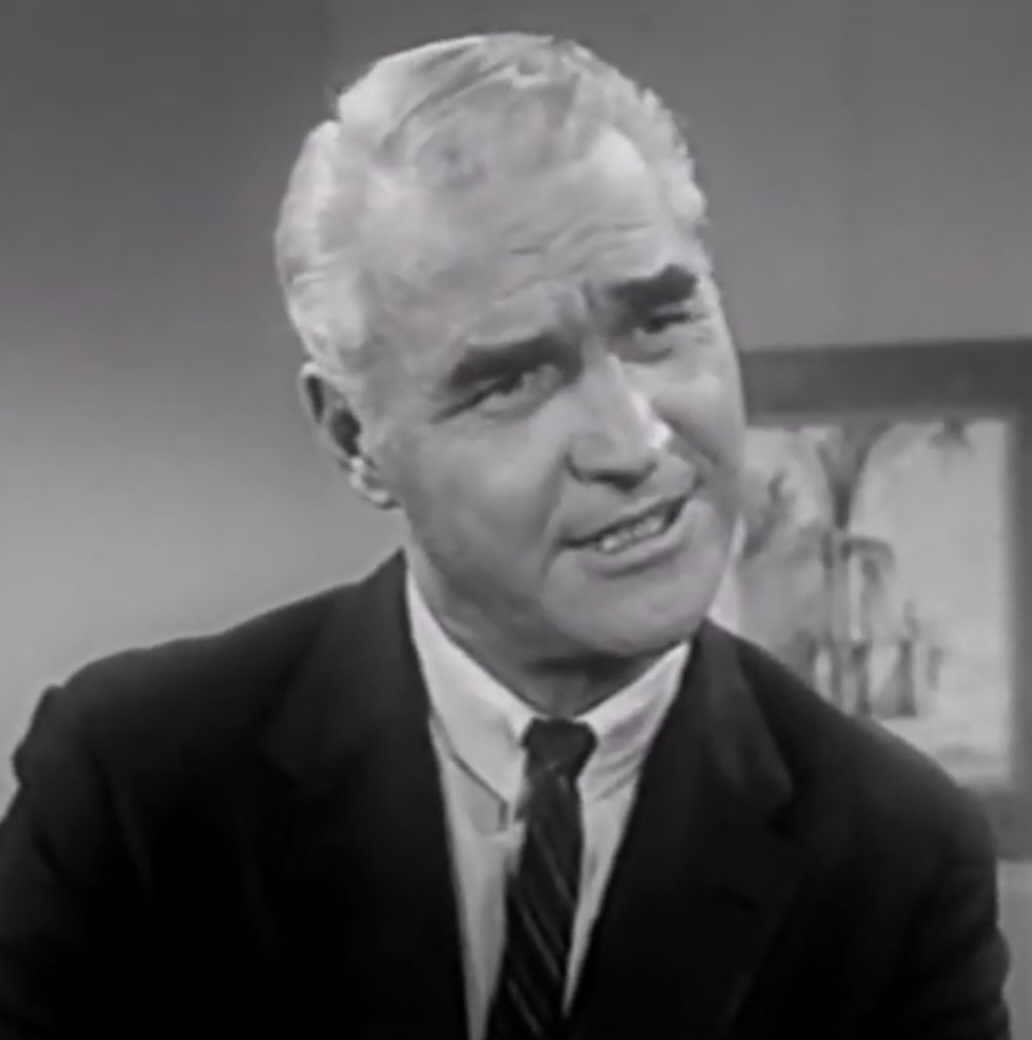
- Morrow in an episode of Lock-Up (1961)
- Born: William Byron Morrow; September 8, 1911; Chicago, Illinois, U.S.
- Died: May 11, 2006 (aged 94); Woodland Hills, Los Angeles, California, U.S.
- Occupation: Actor
- Years active: 1955–1991

William Byron Morrow (September 8, 1911 – May 11, 2006) was an American television and film actor.

== Early life ==
Born in Chicago, Illinois, Morrow served in the Army in World War II, performing in theater productions during his tour of duty. He began appearing in film and television in the late 1950s and amassed some 200 appearances in a career spanning the next 35 years.

Morrow's television work ran from Peter Gunn in the late 1950s to Father Dowling Mysteries in 1991. He mostly played authority figures, often in uniform.

== Career ==
He made seven appearances as a judge in CBS's Perry Mason and played real-life Admiral Chester Nimitz in the pilot episode of NBC's Baa Baa Black Sheep, starring Robert Conrad.

In 1961 Morrow appeared in an episode of The Tab Hunter Show. In 1961 and 1962, he was cast as Captain Keith Gregory in the episodes "No Fat Cops" and "The Deadlier Sex" of the ABC crime drama The New Breed, starring Leslie Nielsen. In 1962 Morrow appeared as Judge Cornwall on the TV Western The Virginian in the episode titled "The Accomplice."

He appeared in Bewitched in 1965 as councilman Kavanaugh season 1 episode 34. He appeared in two episodes of the original series of NBC's Star Trek - in "Amok Time" as Admiral Komack, and in "For the World is Hollow and I Have Touched the Sky" as Admiral Westervliet (per the episode's closing credits; the name is omitted from dialogue). This was the first appearance of an admiral in the original series.

In 1971 Morrow appeared as Harkin on "The Men From Shiloh" (rebranded name for the TV Western The Virginian) in the episode titled "The Politician."

In 1973, he had the role of Admiral Phillips in the ABC-TV movie The President's Plane is Missing.

Morrow may be most-seen today in an uncredited appearance as Mr. Jameson, one of the poker players in the train scene of The Sting.

Byron Morrow also appeared in the first season of Barnaby Jones; episode titled, "A Little Glory, A Little Death"(04/29/1973).

== Death ==
Morrow died at the age of 94 on May 11, 2006, at the Motion Picture and Television Country House and Hospital in Woodland Hills, California.

== Filmography ==
Year	Title	Role	Notes
1955	Luke and the Tenderfoot	George	1 episode
1957	The Mysterians	General	film role, (American version)
1958-1960	Peter Gunn	Frank Kinnard / Warden	2 episodes
1959	Operation Dames	Benny	film role
1959	But Not for Me	Leading Man in Play	film role, Uncredited
1959	The Best of Everything	Executive	film role, Uncredited
1960	This Rebel Breed	Teacher	film role, Uncredited
1960	The Twilight Zone	Martian	1 episode
1960	Wake Me When It's Over	Maj. Horace Tillman	film role, Uncredited
1960	Let's Make Love	Executive	film role, Uncredited
1960	Bat Masterson	Banker - Henry Hanson	1 episode
1960	Michael Shayne	William Carson	1 episode
1960	Sea Hunt	Rebreather	Season 3, Episode 24
1959-1961	Lock-Up	Dr. Ralph Sterling / Detective at Desk	2 episodes
1961	The Tab Hunter Show	Burdick	1 episode
1961	Tallahassee 7000	Dan Nelson	1 episode
1961	The Loretta Young Show	Mr. Howard	1 episode
1961	The Right Approach	Doctor	film role, Uncredited
1961	Atlantis, the Lost Continent	Governor of the Mountains	film role, Uncredited
1961	The Untouchables	Various characters	4 episodes
1961	Rawhide	Secretary	S3:E26, "Incident of the Painted Lady"
1961-1964	Lassie	Bruce Henderson / Professor Stoddard	2 episodes
1961-1970	Death Valley Days	Various roles, including Brigham Young in "An Organ for Brother Brigham" (April 28, 1966)	5 episodes
1962	The Andy Griffith Show	The Commissioner	Episode "Andy on Trial"
1962	Don't Call Me Charlie!	Colonel Evans	Episode "Build a Better Mousetrap"
1962	Panic in Year Zero!	Evacuee from Newhall	film role
1963	Police Nurse	Capt. Pete Ingersoll	film role
1963	Black Zoo	Coroner	film role
1963	Captain Newman, M.D.	Air Surgeon General	film role, Uncredited
1964	Wagon Train	Mr. Haley	1 episode
1964	The Strangler	Dr. Morton	film role
1964	The Best Man	Master of Ceremonies at Banquet	film role, Uncredited
1964	Where Love Has Gone	Bill - Nightclub Doorman	film role, Uncredited
1965-1967	I Dream of Jeannie	General Alton / General Moore	2 episodes
1965-1967	Get Smart	Various roles	3 episodes
1965-1968	Gomer Pyle - U.S.M.C.	John Fenton / Congressman	2 episodes
1965	A Rage to Live	Mr. Tate	film role, Uncredited
1966	40 Guns to Apache Pass	Colonel Reed	film role
1966	Cyborg 2087	Mr. Simmons	film role
1967	Dragnet	Captain Mack	1 episode
1967	Banning	Miles Gratton	film role, Uncredited
1967-1968	Star Trek	Admiral Westervliet / Admiral Komack	2 episodes
1968-1972	Mannix	Various roles	6 episodes
1968-1974	Ironside	Delany / Mr. Gregory	2 episodes
1968	Maryjane	Judge	film role
1968	Where Were You When the Lights Went Out?	Stockholder	film role, Uncredited
1968	The Wrecking Crew	Officer in Hospital Room	film role, Uncredited
1969	Night Gallery	George Packer	1 episode (pilot)
1969	The Computer Wore Tennis Shoes	Leonard - College Regent	film role, Uncredited
1970	Colossus: The Forbin Project	Secretary of State	film role
1971	The Bill Cosby Show	Announcer	1 Episode
1971	Johnny Got His Gun	Brigadier General	film role
1971	The Resurrection of Zachary Wheeler	Gen. Towns	film role
1971	Bearcats!	Colonel Barton	Episode 10, "Tiger, Tiger"
1971	The Virginian	Harkin	Season 9 Episode 15: "The Politician"
1972	Here's Lucy	Announcer	1 episode
1973	Barnaby Jones	Lieutenant	1 episode
1973	Brother on the Run	Captain Franklin	film role
1973	The Stone Killer	Station Commander	film role
1973	The Spook Who Sat by the Door	General	film role
1973	The President's Plane is Missing	Admiral Phillips	ABC-TV movie
1973	The Sting	Mr. Jameson from Chicago	film role, Uncredited
1975	Rollerball	Game Ball Launch Official	film role
1975	A Woman for All Men	Mack	film role
1975	The Rockford Files	Various roles	5 episodes
1976	From Noon till Three	Mental Patient	film role, Uncredited
1976	The Last Tycoon	Studio Executive	film role, Uncredited
1977	Family	Jeffrey Maitland, Sr.	1 episode
1977	Sidewinder 1	Gentry Executive	film role
1977	In the Matter of Karen Ann Quinlan	Attorney General	film role
1978	Born Again	Archibald Cox	film role
1979	The Paper Chase	Bryant	1 episode
1979	Fantasy Island	Mr. Dow	1 episode
1979	B.J. and the Bear	Senator McMasters	1 episode
1979	Winter Kills	Secretary of State	film role, Uncredited
1979-1983	Trapper John, M.D.	Various roles	3 episodes
1980	How to Beat the High Co$t of Living	Charlie Goldring	film role
1983-1984	Matt Houston	Adamson / Doctor	2 episodes
1986	It's Garry Shandling's Show	The Doctor	1 episode
1991	Father Dowling Mysteries	Judge Allsburg	(final appearance)
