= William Mims =

American actor (1927–1991)

- Mims in Custer, 1967
- Born: January 15, 1927; Carthage, Missouri, U.S.
- Died: April 9, 1991 (aged 64); Studio City, Los Angeles, California, U.S.
- Resting place: Forest Lawn Memorial Park (Hollywood Hills)
- Occupation: Actor
- Years active: 1956–1988
- Spouse: Nancy Lou Irgang (m. 1955)
- Children: 1

William Mims (January 15, 1927 – April 9, 1991) was an American actor. He appeared in numerous films such as The Day Mars Invaded Earth, The Ballad of Cable Hogue, and Hot Rods to Hell. He also appeared in classic television series such as Hogan's Heroes, The Beverly Hillbillies, Petticoat Junction, Bonanza, Custer, Wagon Train, Lancer, Perry Mason, Alfred Hitchcock Presents, Thriller, The Twilight Zone, The Fugitive, The Wild Wild West, Airwolf, Adam-12, Ironside, Night Gallery, Kolchak: The Night Stalker, Kung Fu, Columbo and Fantasy Island .

In 1962 Mims appeared as Frank Farnum on the TV western Lawman in the episode titled "The Bride."

Mims was born in Carthage, Missouri, in 1927 and moved to Los Angeles when still a teenager. He graduated from Manual Arts High School and Los Angeles City College. In addition to his film and TV roles, he acted on the Los Angeles stage in Inherit the Wind and Cat on a Hot Tin Roof. He was also the founder and president of The Hollywood Hackers Celebrity Golf Club. He died of cardiac arrest on April 9, 1991, in Studio City, Los Angeles, California at age 64.

== Filmography ==
Year	Title	Role	Notes
1956	I Killed Wild Bill Hickok	Dan	
1959	No Name on the Bullet	Poker Player	Uncredited
1960	Alfred Hitchcock Presents	Guard Callahan	Season 5 Episode 34: "Cell 227" (uncredited)
1960	Young Jesse James	The Reverend	Uncredited
1961	Walk Tall	Jake	
1961	Sanctuary	Lee	
1961	Battle at Bloody Beach	M'Keever	
1961	Wild in the Country	Uncle Rolfe Braxton	
1961	The Children's Hour	Mr. Burton	
1962	Lonely Are the Brave	First Deputy Arraigning Burns	
1963	The Twilight Zone	Dave	Season 4 Episode 13: "The New Exhibit"
1963	The Day Mars Invaded Earth	Dr. Web Spencer	
1963	The Ugly American	Mr. Jacobson	Uncredited
1964	Kisses for My President	Press Secretary Harrington	Uncredited
1965	Hogan's Heroes	Fritz Bowman	Season 1 Episode 14: "Oil for the Lamps of Hogan"
1966	The Chase	Salesman	Uncredited
1967	Rango		Episode: "The Not So Good Train Robbery"
1967	Hot Rods to Hell	Man at Picnic	
1967	Gunfight in Abilene	Ed Scovie	
1967	A Covenant with Death	Gorman	Uncredited
1969	The Bamboo Saucer	Vetry	
1969	Paint Your Wagon	Frock-coated Man	
1970	The Ballad of Cable Hogue	Jensen	
1970	The Traveling Executioner	Lynn	
1970	Flap	Steve Gray	
1970	The Virginian	The Prosecutor	Season 8 Episode 16: "Nightmare"
1971	Johnny Got His Gun	Gentleman	
1971	Night Gallery	Brock Ramsey	Episode: "The Hand of Borgus Weems"
1972	Pickup on 101	Antique Shop Owner	
1975	The World Through the Eyes of Children	Policeman	
1981	Underground Aces		
1986	North and South: Book II	William H. Seward	Uncredited
