= Battle at Bloody Beach =

1961 film

- Original film poster
- Directed by: Herbert Coleman
- Screenplay by: Richard Maibaum; Willard W. Willingham
- Story by: Richard Maibaum
- Produced by: Richard Maibaum
- Starring: Audie Murphy; Gary Crosby; Dolores Michaels; Alejandro Rey
- Cinematography: Kenneth Peach
- Edited by: Jodie Copelan
- Music by: Henry Vars
- Color process: Black and white
- Production company: Associated Producers Incorporated
- Distributed by: 20th Century Fox
- Release date: June 1, 1961
- Running time: 80 minutes
- Country: United States
- Language: English
- Budget: $430,000 or $385,000

Battle at Bloody Beach, (aka Battle on the Beach in the UK and Australia), is a 1961 American CinemaScope drama war film directed by Herbert Coleman and starring Audie Murphy who had previously worked together in Posse from Hell. The film also features Gary Crosby and introduces Alejandro Rey. Battle at Bloody Beach is only the second Audie Murphy movie set in World War II, after his autobiographical To Hell and Back. The film was shot on Santa Catalina Island by Robert Lippert's Associated Producers Incorporated and was released by 20th Century Fox. The film was produced and co-written by Richard Maibaum along with frequent Audie Murphy collaborator Willard W. Willingham.

== Plot ==
Craig Benson (Audie Murphy) is a civilian working for the Navy helping arm and supply guerrilla insurgents in the Philippines. His main purpose, however, is to find his wife Ruth (Dolores Michaels), from whom he was separated by the Japanese invasion of the Philippines.

Coming ashore Benson kills two Japanese soldiers who have ambushed his contact Sgt. Marty Sackler (Gary Crosby). The two initially meet a band of dubious guerrillas who act as bandits led by a renegade American M'Keever (William Mims) who desires the weapons Benson brought but concealed. Realising M'Keever is a dead loss, the two fight but actual guerrillas led by Julio Fontana (Alejandro Rey) and an American boxer trapped in the Philippines Tiger Blair (Ivan Dixon) defeat M'Keever's bandits and kill him.

Benson agrees to arm Fontana's guerrilla band and meets a group of American civilians he will evacuate to Australia including his wife Ruth (Dolores Michaels) who believed him killed and is romantically involved with Fontana.

Benson sees her with Fontana. He confronts Fontana about his involvement with his wife. Benson begins leading the Americans to a point where a submarine will take them to Australia. Craig tells Ruth he wanted to find her and leave.

They reach Sackler's hut and introduces him to Fontana. Benson advises Fontana where the weapons are located. They await the arrival of the submarine. Ruth tells Craig she isn't going with him and will continue to fight with the guerillas.

The Japanese are quickly approaching. They quickly board the shipwreck and arm themselves with the guns. They fire on the Japanese, who retreat. Blanco and Mrs. Thompson are killed. They hold out on the shipwreck, waiting for the submarine.

The Japanese make an offer for them to surrender. Benson will be shot and the others will be given limited freedom. Fontana refuses the deal and holds Benson at gunpoint, with Ruth's help.

Sackler tries to swim out to reach his shack but is attacked and eaten by a shark. The next day the Japanese mortars arrive. Craig is missing and the others speculate on his absence. The Japanese begin firing the mortars. All but Mr. And Mrs. Pelham go below for safety. The Japanese swarm the shipwreck. Benson arrives with guerilla support and overwhelms the Japanese.

Benson says goodbye to Ruth but she says she wants to come with him. They get in a raft and head for the submarine.

== Cast ==
- Audie Murphy as Craig Benson
- Gary Crosby as Marty Sackler
- Dolores Michaels as Ruth Benson
- Alejandro Rey as Julio Fontana
- Marjorie Stapp as Caroline Pelham
- Barry Atwater as Pelham
- E. J. André as Dr. Van Bart
- Dale Ishimoto as Blanco
- Míriam Colón as Nahni
- Pilar Seurat as Camota
- Lillian Bronson as Delia Ellis
- William Mims as M'Keever
- Ivan Dixon as Tiger Blair
- Kevin Brodie as Timmy Thompson
- Sara Anderson as Mrs. Thompson
- Lloyd Kino as Japanese lieutenant

== Production ==
Heavy seas caused the budget to go $130,000 over the original $300,000 estimate.

== See also ==
- List of American films of 1961
