= Springtown, California =

Unincorporated community in California, United States

Springtown
- Unincorporated community
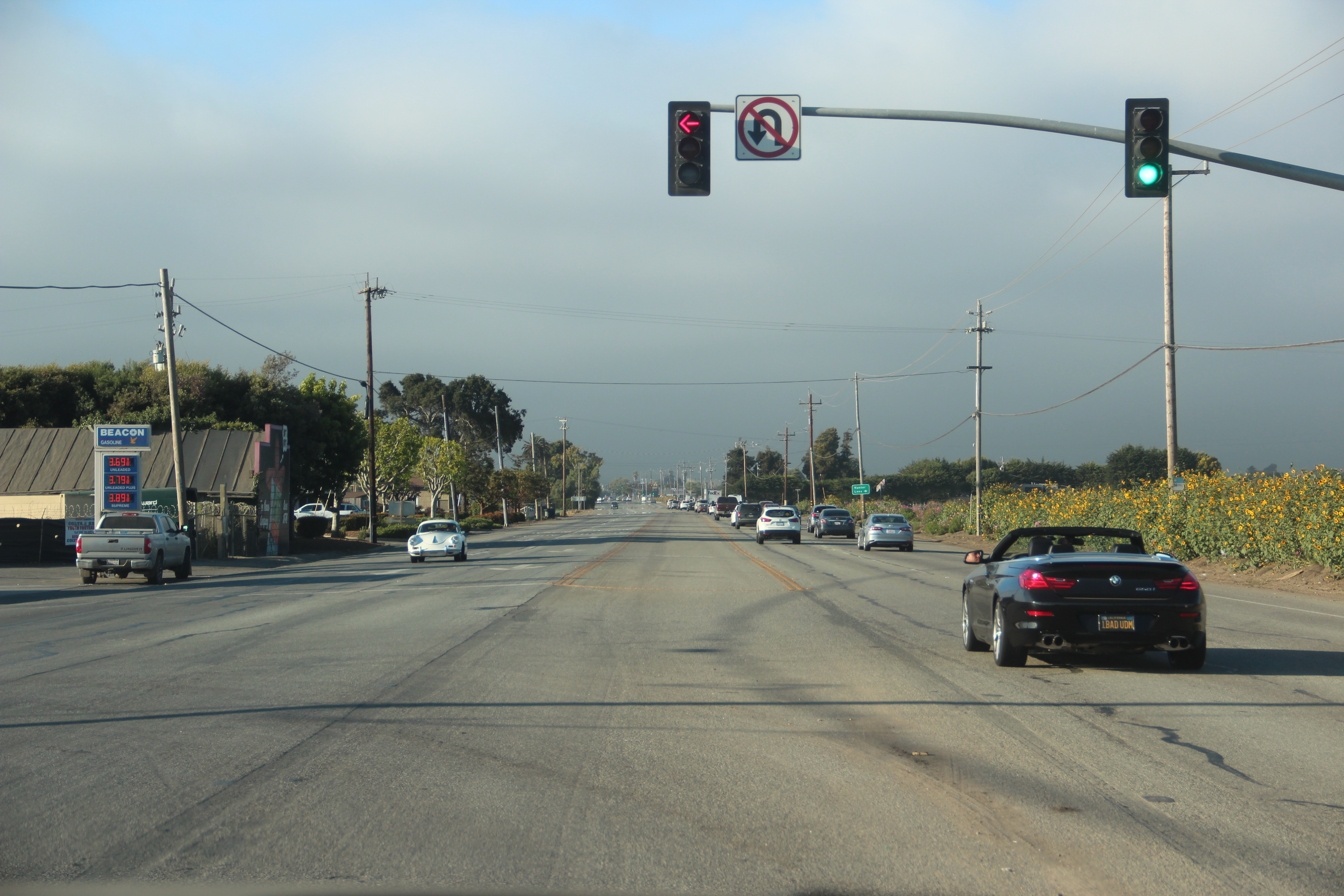
- California State Route 68 in Springtown, 2019

- Location in California Springtown (the United States)
- Coordinates: 36°38′41″N 121°39′52″W
- Country: United States
- State: California
- County: Monterey
- Elevation: 52 ft (16 m)
- GNIS feature ID: 221451

Springtown (formerly Confederate Corners) is an unincorporated community in Monterey County, California, United States.

== History ==
Originally Springtown or Spring Town, the place was named Confederate Corners after some Southerners settled there in the late 1860s. The early settlement included a general store and a wagon-making factory.

In the 1960s, it was considered that the community should become a retirement community.

The place is the inspiration for the fictional small town "Rebel Corners" in John Steinbeck's novel The Wayward Bus. It is located 2 miles (3.2 km) south-southwest of Salinas, at the corner of California State Route 68 and Hitchcock Road.

=== Name change ===
In 2017 a local campaign was started to rename the area. The Monterey County Board of Supervisors voted in support of the name change.

In 2018, the U.S. Board on Geographic Names approved changing the name to Springtown in reference to Francis and John Spring, who had moved in the 1800s to Monterey County from San Francisco. The name "Confederate Corners" was rarely used or known among locals, and the area had no signs displaying the name.

== Government ==
At the county level, Springtown is represented on the Monterey County Board of Supervisors by Supervisor Jane Parker.

In the California State Legislature, Springtown is in the 17th senatorial district, represented by Democrat John Laird, and in the 30th Assembly district, represented by Democrat Dawn Addis.

In the United States House of Representatives, Springtown is in California's 18th congressional district, represented by Democrat Zoe Lofgren.
