= Jodie Copelan =

American film director

- Born: Joseph B. Caplan; January 6, 1914; Los Angeles, California, USA
- Died: November 10, 1977 (aged 63); Los Angeles, California, USA
- Occupations: Film editor, director
- Spouse: Lillian Schleifer

Jodie Copelan (born Joseph Caplan and sometimes credited as Jodie Caplan) was an American film editor who worked on dozens of B movies and TV shows from the late 1940s through the 1970s.

== Biography ==
=== Beginnings ===
Jodie was born in Los Angeles, California, to Julius Caplan and Rosie Siegel. He started going by Jodie Copelan professionally early on in his career.

=== Career ===
He began working as an assistant editor sometime around the early 1930s, and got his first credit as an editor on 1947's The Guilty. He spent the next 30 years editing and directing films and TV episodes; his sole directorial credit on a feature film came in 1958 with the release of Ambush at Cimarron Pass, a Western produced by Robert L. Lippert, who Copelan edited many films for. The film was released by 20th Century Fox featuring a young Clint Eastwood in a supporting role.

=== Personal life ===
He married Lillian Schleifer in 1949. Jodie was a lifelong Dodgers fan who spent his later years tracking prospects from the farm league. "If I had my life to live over again, it would be in baseball," he told a reporter for The Los Angeles Times in 1973.

== Selected filmography ==
As editor:

- Laserblast (1978)
- The Thousand Plane Raid (1969)
- Wild on the Beach (1965)
- Stage to Thunder Rock (1964)
- The Young Swingers (1963)
- Harbor Lights (1963)
- The Day Mars Invaded Earth (1964)
- The Yellow Canary (1963)
- The Firebrand (1962)
- Womanhunt (1962)
- The Purple Hills (1961)
- Night Tide (1961)
- Ring of Terror (1961)
- Counterplot (1959)
- Machete (1958)
- Night of the Blood Beast (1958)
- Under Fire (1957)
- The Deerslayer (1957)
- Apache Warrior (1957)
- Kronos (1957)
- Battle Taxi (1955)
- The Snow Creature (1954)
- Murder Without Tears (1953)
- Ghost Town Raiders (1951)
- Kilroy Was Here (1947)
- The Guilty (1947)

As director:

- Ambush at Cimarron Pass (1958)
