= The Fiend Who Walked the West =

1958 film by Gordon Douglas

- Theatrical release poster
- Directed by: Gordon Douglas
- Screenplay by: Harry Brown; Philip Yordan
- Based on: Kiss of Death by: Ben Hecht; Charles Lederer; Eleazar Lipsky
- Produced by: Herbert B. Swope Jr.
- Starring: Hugh O'Brian; Robert Evans; Dolores Michaels; Linda Cristal; Stephen McNally
- Cinematography: Joseph MacDonald
- Edited by: Hugh S. Fowler
- Music by: Les Baxter
- Production company: Twentieth Century Fox
- Distributed by: Twentieth Century Fox
- Release date: August 1, 1958
- Running time: 101 minutes
- Country: United States
- Language: English
- Budget: $850,000

The Fiend Who Walked the West is a 1958 American Western film based on the 1947 film noir Kiss of Death. Almost a horror western, the story involves psychotic ex cellmate Felix Griffin terrorizing his former cellmate Daniel Hardy and his family. The director was Gordon Douglas and the film stars Hugh O'Brian, Robert Evans, Dolores Michaels, Linda Cristal, Stephen McNally, and Ron Ely.

== Plot ==
Imprisoned bank robber Daniel Slade Hardy (Hugh O'Brian) shares a cell with Felix Griffin (Robert Evans), a smiling, psychotic inmate who murders a fellow prisoner by feeding him ground glass. After Hardy confides details about his hidden loot, Griffin is released early and embarks on a sadistic rampage to claim the money for himself. He murders anyone connected to the heist—including the elderly, wheelchair-bound mother of an accomplice with a bow and arrow—and terrorizes Hardy's pregnant wife, Ellen (Linda Cristal), causing her to miscarry. Driven to desperation, Hardy breaks out of jail and strikes a deal with the authorities to hunt down his unhinged former cellmate before Griffin can destroy his family completely.

== Cast ==
- Hugh O'Brian - Daniel Slade Hardy
- Robert Evans - Felix Griffin
- Dolores Michaels - May
- Linda Cristal - Ellen Hardy
- Stephen McNally - Marshal Frank Emmett
- Edward Andrews - Judge Parker
- Ron Ely - Deputy Jim Dyer
- Gregory Morton - Defense Attorney Gage

== See also ==
- List of American films of 1958
