= Ambush at Cimarron Pass =

1958 film

- Movie poster
- Directed by: Jodie Copelan
- Written by: John K. Butler; Richard G. Taylor
- Based on: story by Robert A. Reeds; Robert E. Woods
- Produced by: Herbert E. Mendelson
- Starring: Scott Brady; Margia Dean; Clint Eastwood
- Cinematography: John M. Nickolaus Jr.
- Music by: Paul Sawtell; Bert Shefter
- Production company: Regal Films Inc
- Distributed by: 20th Century Fox
- Release dates: February 11, 1958 (Los Angeles); March 1958 (United States)
- Running time: 73 minutes
- Country: United States
- Language: English

Ambush at Cimarron Pass is a 1958 American Western film directed by Jodie Copelan and starring Scott Brady and Clint Eastwood (third billed, later first billed upon reissue). The film also features Margia Dean, Irving Bacon, Frank Gerstle, Baynes Barron, and William Vaughn.

It is the only feature film ever directed by Copelan, who was primarily a film editor. It was also the final film in which Eastwood appeared in before transitioning into stardom, beginning with A Fistful of Dollars in 1964.

== Plot ==
The survivors of a squad of cavalry led by Sergeant Blake are escorting a prisoner, Corbin, back to their fort. Corbin had been attempting to sell repeating rifles to the Apache, and the cavalry are now carrying the rifles. They encounter the survivors of a Texas cattle drive, all former Confederate soldiers led by Sam Prescott, who include the young Keith Williams who still hates northerners and has to be restrained from shooting Blake. While the two groups are discussing their predicament, the Apache deliver a bound Teresa Santos, a young woman who is the only survivor of a raid on a nearby ranch. It turns out this was a distraction so the Apache could steal the group's horses.

Blake and Prescott agree to join forces and continue on foot to the fort, through Cimarron Pass. Judge Stanfield, a survivor in Prescott's party, suggests trading the rifles to the Apache for their horses, but Blake dismisses this on the basis that the rifles are the only means they have of defending themselves against the superior Apache numbers. When Blake ignores Stanfield's threats of criminal charges, Stanfield plots with Keith to overthrow Blake's command.

Several of the group, mostly Blake's men, are killed or wounded in skirmishes or ambushes, including Blake's Indian scout, Henry. Johnny Willow takes over scouting duties, while Teresa flirts with Keith. Stanfield encourages Keith, who is annoyed at Blake's leadership and the way Prescott and Johnny are going along with it, to mutiny. Keith's first attempt is interrupted by an Apache attack but, in the aftermath, he challenges Blake, who easily defeats him. After this, Keith largely falls into line and decides to take out his anger on the Apache rather than Blake. During an Apache attack, Stanfield frees Corbin so that he can complete the deal with the Apache, but Corbin betrays and kills him. Corbin then attempts to deliver some of the rifles, but the Apache kill him on sight and Blake's group is able to recover them.

Blake decides to raid the Apache camp and drive off their horses, to remove their advantage. The raid is successful in stampeding the horses, but escalates into a battle in which Johnny Willow and most of the Apache are killed. During the fighting, Blake rescues Teresa from an Apache warrior, and she kisses him. The raid seems to end the direct threat from the Apache but the group is still short of food and water. As they continue towards the fort, Teresa collapses from exhaustion and Blake realises that the rifles are too heavy to carry any further. Rather than let them fall into the hands of the Apache he orders them to be burned. The final shot is of the fort, suggesting that the group reached safety.

== Cast ==
- Scott Brady as Sergeant Matt Blake
- Margia Dean as Teresa Santos
- Clint Eastwood as Keith Williams
- Irving Bacon as Judge Stanfield
- Frank Gerstle as Capt. Sam Prescott
- Ray Boyle as Johnny Willows (billed as Dirk London)
- Baynes Barron as Corbin the Gunrunner
- William Vaughn as Henry the Scout
- Ken Mayer as Corporal Schwitzer
- John Damler as Private Zach
- Keith Richards as Private Lasky
- John Frederick as Private Nathan (billed as John Merrick)

== Production ==
The film was made by Regal Films Inc. It was one of a two-picture deal Scott Brady signed with Regal the other being Blood Arrow. Clint Eastwood, at the time best known for his performance in Lafayette Escadrille, was cast in September 1957.

== Reception ==
Most film guides include in their entry for this film a quote attributed to Eastwood, "probably the lousiest Western ever made." Eastwood recalled how he felt when he saw the film at a movie theatre. In a 1978 interview he said he felt "really depressed" at the time and said of the film "It was sooo [sic] bad I just kept sinking lower and lower in my seat. I said to my wife 'I'm going to quit, I'm really going to quit. I gotta go back to school, I got to start doing something with my life.' "

The film was never released on VHS. It was released on DVD and Blu-ray by Olive Films in 2012.
