= Victor Vicas =

French film director

- Born: 25 March 1918; Moscow, Russia
- Died: 9 December 1985 (aged 67); Paris, France
- Occupations: Film director, screenwriter
- Years active: 1941-1985

Victor Vicas (25 March 1918 – 9 December 1985) was a French film director and screenwriter. His film The Wayward Bus was entered into the 7th Berlin International Film Festival. Between 1974 and 1983 he directed all thirty six episodes of the French TV series The Tiger Brigades.

== Selected filmography ==
- Dreams That Money Can Buy (1947, director: Hans Richter) - cinematographer
- No Way Back (1953) - director
- A Double Life (1954) - director
- Master of Life and Death (1955) - director
- I'll Get Back to Kandara (1956) - director
- The Wayward Bus (1957) - director
- Count Five and Die (1957) - director
- Amour de poche (1957, director: Pierre Kast) - actor
- SOS – Gletscherpilot (1959) - director
- Jons und Erdme (1959) - director
- Two Among Millions (1961) - director; co-director: Wieland Liebske
- Stop Train 349 (1963, director: Rolf Hädrich) - translation to English
- Jack and Jenny (1963) - director
- Johann Sebastian Bach's Futile Journey to Fame (1980) - director
