= Harry Spalding =

American screenwriter (1913–2008)

Harry Spalding (1913–2008) was an American writer best known for the films he wrote for Robert L. Lippert and director Maury Dexter. He later worked for the Walt Disney Company.

He sometimes wrote under the name "Henry Cross".

== Select credits ==
- Country Music Holiday (1958)
- Freckles (1960)
- Teenage Millionaire (as H. B. Cross) (1961)
- Air Patrol (original screenplay - as Henry Cross) (1962)
- Hand of Death (uncredited) (1962)
- The Day Mars Invaded Earth (writer) (1962)
- The Firebrand (writer) (1962)
- Womanhunt (story) (1962)
- Young Guns of Texas (writer - as Henry Cross) (1962)
- Harbor Lights (writer) (1963)
- House of the Damned (writer) (1963)
- Police Nurse (writer) (1963)
- The Young Swingers (writer) (1963)
- Surf Party (1964)
- Night Train to Paris (as Henry Cross) (1964)
- Raiders from Beneath the Sea (screenplay) (1964)
- The Murder Game (1965)
- The Earth Dies Screaming (as Henry Cross) (1964)
- Witchcraft (writer) (1964)
- Spaceflight IC-1 (writer - as Henry Cross) (1965)
- Curse of the Fly (1965)
- Wild on the Beach (writer) (1965)
- Run Like a Thief (1967)
- One Little Indian (writer) (1973)
- Chosen Survivors (story and co-screenplay - as H.B. Cross) (1974)
- The Sky's the Limit (1975, TV)
- The Ghost of Cypress Swamp (1977, TV)
- The Watcher in the Woods (1980)
- Witchery (1988)
