= Harry Wilson (actor) =

English character actor (1897–1978)

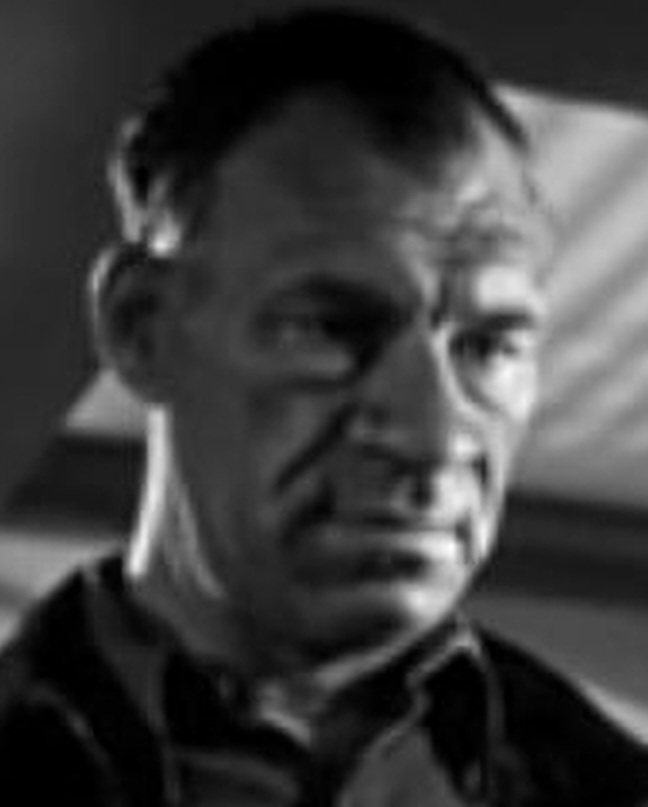
- Wilson in He Walked by Night (1948)
- Born: 22 November 1897; London, England
- Died: 6 September 1978 (aged 80); Woodland Hills, Los Angeles, California, U.S.
- Occupation: Actor
- Years active: 1928–1965
- Relatives: Shauna Bloom (granddaughter)

Harry Wilson (22 November 1897 – 6 September 1978) was a British character actor who appeared in over 300 films from 1928 to 1965 and proudly proclaimed himself "Hollywood's ugliest man".

== Career ==
His distinctive facial features and voice (often said to be the result of acromegaly, a disorder of the pituitary gland, although they do not fully meet the criteria) often led to him being cast as various henchmen, thugs, convicts and brawlers. His best-known roles include a Winkie Guard in The Wizard of Oz (1939); the female monster in Frankenstein's Daughter (1958); and together with Mike Mazurki, the henchman of George Raft's "Spats Colombo" in Some Like It Hot (1959).

In 1961, in a credited role, he appeared as a townsman in the TV Western series Bat Masterson (S3E18 "The Prescott Campaign").

For over fifteen years Wilson was a stand-in for Wallace Beery, and he is the grandfather of actress Shauna Bloom.

Wilson died in 1978, aged 80.

== Selected filmography ==
- The Racket (1928) - Man at Funeral (uncredited)
- Shadow of the Law (1930) - Convict (uncredited)
- The Big House (1930) - Inmate #46375 (uncredited)
- Her Man (1930) - Drunken Sailor (uncredited)
- Way for a Sailor (1930) - Navy Man in Brawl (uncredited)
- A Lady's Morals (1930) - Tavern Extra (uncredited)
- The Gay Diplomat (1931) - Footman (uncredited)
- Sidewalks of New York (1931) - One of Butch's Henchmen (uncredited)
- The Tip-Off (1931) - Hood at Scarno's (uncredited)
- The Mad Genius (1931) - Curtain Man (uncredited)
- The Guilty Generation (1931) - Emmett - Mike's Henchman (uncredited)
- Ladies of the Big House (1931) - Buddy (uncredited)
- Delicious (1931) - Workman on Ship Cargo Deck (uncredited)
- The Beast of the City (1932) - Sam's Henchman (uncredited)
- Grand Hotel (1932) - Worker (uncredited)
- Night Court (1932) - Acquitted Truck Driver (uncredited)
- Huddle (1932) - Stoker in Mill (uncredited)
- The Dark Horse (1932) - Man in Jail Cell (uncredited)
- My Pal, the King (1932) - Soldier (uncredited)
- Blondie of the Follies (1932) - Loading Dock Worker (uncredited)
- Hold 'Em Jail (1932) - Sam's Son (uncredited)
- The Golden West (1932) - Townsman (uncredited)
- The Sport Parade (1932) - Heckler in Montage (uncredited)
- 20,000 Years in Sing Sing (1932) - Seated Prisoner (uncredited)
- Born to Fight (1932) - Gang Member
- Goldie Gets Along (1933) - Fan at Beauty Contest (uncredited)
- Child of Manhattan (1933) - Loveland Dance Hall Extra (uncredited)
- Grand Slam (1933) - Mug (uncredited)
- Gabriel Over the White House (1933) - Nick's Henchman (uncredited)
- The Mayor of Hell (1933) - Joe's Henchman (uncredited)
- The Man Who Dared (1933) - Coal Miner (uncredited)
- Baby Face (1933) - Laborer (uncredited)
- The Prizefighter and the Lady (1933) - Training Camp Observer (uncredited)
- Hoopla (1933) - Roustabout (uncredited)
- Gambling Lady (1934) - Funeral Attendee (uncredited)
- Coming Out Party (1934) - Delivery Man (uncredited)
- Lazy River (1934) - Prisoner (uncredited)
- Whirlpool (1934) - Carnival Customer in Brawl (uncredited)
- Sing and Like It (1934) - Mug in Pool Hall (uncredited)
- We're Not Dressing (1934) - Smiling Sailor (uncredited)
- Such Women Are Dangerous (1934) - Court Bailiff (uncredited)
- The Cat's-Paw (1934) - Gangster (uncredited)
- The Affairs of Cellini (1934) - Henchman (uncredited)
- Judge Priest (1934) - Townsman in Saloon (uncredited)
- Lady by Choice (1934) - Bar Brawler (uncredited)
- The Captain Hates the Sea (1934) - Sailor (uncredited)
- The Painted Veil (1934) - Extra in Hong Kong Scene (uncredited)
- 365 Nights in Hollywood (1934) - Student Actor (uncredited)
- Mills of the Gods (1934) - Bit Role (uncredited)
- The Best Man Wins (1935) - Seaman (uncredited)
- Under Pressure (1935) - Cement Worker (uncredited)
- The Whole Town's Talking (1935) - Convict (uncredited)
- Les Misérables (1935) - Galley Fight Warder (uncredited)
- The Case of the Curious Bride (1935) - Mug Bringing Oscar to Mason's (uncredited)
- Mary Jane's Pa' (1935) - Roughneck (uncredited)
- Break of Hearts (1935) - Stagehand (uncredited)
- After the Dance (1935) - Convict (uncredited)
- Dante's Inferno (1935) - Stoker (uncredited)
- Metropolitan (1935) - Stage Hand (uncredited)
- One Way Ticket (1935) - Con (uncredited)
- A Tale of Two Cities (1935) - Revolutionary (uncredited)
- Riffraff (1936) - Man on Dance Floor (uncredited)
- Tough Guy (1936) - Gangster (uncredited)
- Anything Goes (1936) - Plug Ugly (uncredited)
- Modern Times (1936) - Worker (uncredited)
- The Bohemian Girl (1936) - Executioner (uncredited)
- The Country Doctor (1936) - Married Logger (uncredited)
- Flash Gordon (1936, Serial) - Pit Control Operator (uncredited)
- Sworn Enemy (1936) - Strongarm Man (uncredited)
- Our Relations (1936) - Seaman (uncredited)
- Murder with Pictures (1936) - Girard Henchman (uncredited)
- The Gay Desperado (1936) - Movie Theatre Brawler (uncredited)
- All American Chump (1936) - Gangster (uncredited)
- Come and Get It (1936) - Barfly (uncredited)
- Three Smart Girls (1936) - Man in Custody (uncredited)
- That Girl from Paris (1936) - Dock Worker (uncredited)
- God's Country and the Woman (1937) - Logger (uncredited)
- You Only Live Once (1937) - Convict Watching Baseball Game (uncredited)
- Man of the People (1937) - Workman (uncredited)
- Sea Devils (1937) - Saloon Waiter (uncredited)
- Pick a Star (1937) - Actor in Saloon Brawl Scene (uncredited)
- San Quentin (1937) - Marching Convict (uncredited)
- A Day at the Races (1937) - Detective with Sheriff (uncredited)
- Meet the Boyfriend (1937) - Thug (uncredited)
- Topper (1937) - Onlooker at Street Brawl (uncredited)
- The Big Shot (1937) - Chauffeur (uncredited)
- Big City (1937) - Comet Cab Driver (uncredited)
- The Bride Wore Red (1937) - Sailor at Cordellera Bar (uncredited)
- The Wrong Road (1937) - Convict (uncredited)
- Tim Tyler's Luck (1937, Serial) - Henchman [Ch. 12] (uncredited)
- The Big Broadcast of 1938 (1938) - Member of Black Gang (uncredited)
- A Slight Case of Murder (1938) - Butch (uncredited)
- King of the Newsboys (1938) - Coachman (uncredited)
- He Couldn't Say No (1938) - Jostled Subway Rider (uncredited)
- The Adventures of Marco Polo (1938) - Guard with Chamberlain (uncredited)
- Professor Beware (1938) - Brawler (uncredited)
- Racket Busters (1938) - Truck Driver (uncredited)
- Valley of the Giants (1938) - Landowner (uncredited)
- If I Were King (1938) - Beggar (uncredited)
- The Cowboy and the Lady (1938) - Man Shaving (uncredited)
- The Phantom Creeps (1939, Serial) - Schooner Crewman (uncredited)
- Flying G-Men (1939) - Henchman (uncredited)
- Let Freedom Ring (1939) - Barfly / Workman (uncredited)
- Bulldog Drummond's Secret Police (1939) - Moving Man (uncredited)
- Bridal Suite (1939) - Mountaineer with Guide (uncredited)
- Captain Fury (1939) - Convict (uncredited)
- The Gracie Allen Murder Case (1939) - Thug (uncredited)
- Invitation to Happiness (1939) - Man at Nightclub Entrance (uncredited)
- Coast Guard (1939) - Second Expressman (uncredited)
- The Wizard of Oz (1939) - Winkie (uncredited)
- Bad Little Angel (1939) - Fireman (uncredited)
- Invisible Stripes (1939) - Worker (uncredited)
- Northwest Passage (1940) - Ranger (uncredited)
- One Million B.C. (1940) - Rock Person
- Boom Town (1940) - Townsman (uncredited)
- Wyoming (1940) - Townsman (uncredited)
- The Great Dictator (1940) - Soldier in Field (uncredited)
- Go West (1940) - Barfly / Train Passenger (uncredited)
- Maisie Was a Lady (1941) - Man at Carnival Sideshow (uncredited)
- Ridin' on a Rainbow (1941) - Cupid in Holiday Pageant (uncredited)
- Road Show (1941) - Townsman in Brawl (uncredited)
- Footlight Fever (1941) - Mike - Sailor in Pinky's Bar (uncredited)
- Hold That Ghost (1941) - Harry (uncredited)
- Honky Tonk (1941) - Cowboy on Back of Train (uncredited)
- Birth of the Blues (1941) - One of Blackie's Thugs (uncredited)
- Shadow of the Thin Man (1941) - Mug Shoving Waiter / Racetrack Security Guard (uncredited)
- Call Out the Marines (1942) - Café Patron (uncredited)
- Woman of the Year (1942) - Lubbeck's Bodyguard (uncredited)
- Born to Sing (1942) - Getaway Cabbie (uncredited)
- Tarzan's New York Adventure (1942) - Circus Roustabout (uncredited)
- Pardon My Sarong (1942) - Varnoff's Henchman (uncredited)
- The Big Street (1942) - Fethington (uncredited)
- Stand by for Action (1942) - Sailor (uncredited)
- Hangmen Also Die! (1943) - Ugly German Bodyguard (uncredited)
- Pilot No. 5 (1943) - Pinball Player (uncredited)
- Batman (1943, Serial) - Henchman (uncredited)
- Swing Fever (1943) - Killer's Second (uncredited)
- The Cross of Lorraine (1943) - French Soldier (uncredited)
- Bermuda Mystery (1944) - Wharf Rat (uncredited)
- The Hairy Ape (1944) - Tough in Bar (uncredited)
- Louisiana Hayride (1944) - Listener on Train (uncredited)
- Call of the Rockies (1944) - Miner (uncredited)
- Haunted Harbor (1944, Serial) - Barfly [Ch. 1] (uncredited)
- Lost in a Harem (1944) - Native in Café Audience (uncredited)
- The Princess and the Pirate (1944) - Pirate at the 'Bucket of Blood' (uncredited)
- The Lost Weekend (1945) (uncredited)
- The Captain from Köpenick (1945) - Suspect in Police Station (uncredited)
- Frisco Sal (1945) - Piano Tuner (uncredited)
- Within These Walls (1945) - Convict (uncredited)
- Her Highness and the Bellboy (1945) - Jake's Joint Patron (uncredited)
- Adventure (1945) - Big Mug (uncredited)
- A Letter for Evie (1946) - Uncle (uncredited)
- The Bandit of Sherwood Forest (1946) - Outlaw (uncredited)
- Of Human Bondage (1946) - Tough Guy (uncredited)
- Lawless Breed (1946) - Ugly Henchman Darning Sock (uncredited)
- The Strange Woman (1946) - Lumberjack (uncredited)
- High Barbaree (1947) - Vendor (uncredited)
- Brute Force (1947) - Tyrone (uncredited)
- Killer Dill (1947) - Diner in Opening Montage (uncredited)
- Heaven Only Knows (1947) - Angry Man at Meeting (uncredited)
- Wild Harvest (1947) - Alperson Crew Member (uncredited)
- Forever Amber (1947) - Minor Role (uncredited)
- High Wall (1947) - Patient in Visitors' Room (uncredited)
- Are You with It? (1948) - Porky (uncredited)
- Saigon (1948) - Stevedore (uncredited)
- A Southern Yankee (1948) - Confederate Soldier (uncredited)
- Macbeth (1948) - Banquet Guest (uncredited)
- Luxury Liner (1948) - Ship's Crewman (uncredited)
- Unknown Island (1948) - Barfly (uncredited)
- The Three Musketeers (1948) - Kidnapper (uncredited)
- Kiss the Blood Off My Hands (1948) - Man in Pub (uncredited)
- He Walked by Night (1948) - Prison Inmate (uncredited)
- Hills of Home (1948) - Wild Man (uncredited)
- The Paleface (1948) - Cowboy in Saloon (uncredited)
- Force of Evil (1948) - Henchman (uncredited)
- Wake of the Red Witch (1948) - 'Red Witch' Seaman (uncredited)
- Knock on Any Door (1949) - Man (uncredited)
- Take Me Out to the Ball Game (1949) - Baseball Game Attendee (uncredited)
- A Connecticut Yankee in King Arthur's Court (1949) - Guard (uncredited)
- Anna Lucasta (1949) - Barfly (uncredited)
- Rope of Sand (1949) - Guard (uncredited)
- Thieves' Highway (1949) - Fifth, Ugly Man at City Bar (uncredited)
- The Reckless Moment (1949) - Man in Bus Depot (uncredited)
- All the King's Men (1949) - One of Duffy's Goons (uncredited)
- Bride for Sale (1949) - Bruiser (uncredited)
- Buccaneer's Girl (1950) - Bertram (uncredited)
- Quicksand (1950) - Pier Spectator (uncredited)
- Cargo to Capetown (1950) - Brawling Seaman / Deck Crewman (uncredited)
- Comanche Territory (1950) - Barfly (uncredited)
- Beware of Blondie (1950) - Convict (uncredited)
- Fortunes of Captain Blood (1950) - Crew Member (uncredited)
- Abbott and Costello in the Foreign Legion (1950) - Thug (uncredited)
- Convicted (1950) - Convict in Prison Yard (uncredited)
- The Fuller Brush Girl (1950) - Crew Member (uncredited)
- Wyoming Mail (1950) - Bet-Loser (uncredited)
- Last of the Buccaneers (1950) - Pirate (uncredited)
- Pygmy Island (1950) - Ugly Thug with Machine Gun (uncredited)
- Al Jennings of Oklahoma (1951) - Barfly (uncredited)
- The Enforcer (1951) - B.J. - Herman's Sidekick (uncredited)
- The Lemon Drop Kid (1951) - Courtroom Spectator (unconfirmed)
- M (1951) - Man in Mob (uncredited)
- Double Crossbones (1951) - Pirate (uncredited)
- China Corsair (1951) - Sailor / Henchman (uncredited)
- Journey Into Light (1951) - Bum (uncredited)
- Anne of the Indies (1951) - Pirate at Inn (uncredited)
- The Barefoot Mailman (1951) - Theron Henchman (uncredited)
- Scandal Sheet (1952) - Barfly (uncredited)
- Harem Girl (1952) - Jamal Henchman (uncredited)
- Lone Star (1952) - Townsman (uncredited)
- Mutiny (1952) - Crew Member (uncredited)
- The Sellout (1952) - Prisoner in Cell (uncredited)
- Apache Country (1952) - Henchman (uncredited)
- Montana Territory (1952) - Choppy (uncredited)
- Glory Alley (1952) - Pug in Saloon (uncredited)
- Plymouth Adventure (1952) - Pub Patron (uncredited)
- The Raiders (1952) - Juror (uncredited)
- Million Dollar Mermaid (1952) - Minor Role (uncredited)
- Against All Flags (1952) - Pirate (uncredited)
- Abbott and Costello Meet Captain Kidd (1952) - Ugly Pirate (uncredited)
- Fort Ti (1953) - Ranger Recruit (uncredited)
- Raiders of the Seven Seas (1953) - Pirate (uncredited)
- A Slight Case of Larceny (1953) - Youngwell (uncredited)
- The 5,000 Fingers of Dr. T. (1953) - Guard / Doorman (uncredited)
- Vice Squad (1953) - Man in Lineup (uncredited)
- Abbott and Costello Meet Dr. Jekyll and Mr. Hyde (1953) - Man Asking for Match (uncredited)
- The Golden Blade (1953) - Old Soldier (uncredited)
- Captain Scarface (1953) - Tall, Ugly Deck Sailor (uncredited)
- Crime Wave (1953) - Parolee (uncredited)
- Calamity Jane (1953) - Barfly (uncredited)
- Killer Ape (1953) - Dr. Andrews' Henchman (uncredited)
- Duffy of San Quentin (1954) - Lou - Convict (uncredited)
- Overland Pacific (1954) - Barfly (uncredited)
- Rails Into Laramie (1954) - Railroad Workman (uncredited)
- River of No Return (1954) - Prospector (uncredited)
- Them! (1954) - Alcoholic Ward Patient (uncredited)
- The Far Country (1954) - Miner (uncredited)
- Down Three Dark Streets (1954) - Brenda Ralles' Neighbor (uncredited)
- The Human Jungle (1954) - Man Being Booked at Station (uncredited)
- The Silver Chalice (1954) - Ruffian (uncredited)
- Sign of the Pagan (1954) - Hun (uncredited)
- Big House, U.S.A. (1955) - Inmate Who Starts Fight (uncredited)
- City of Shadows (1955) - Barfly (uncredited)
- It's Always Fair Weather (1955) - Butch McSween (uncredited)
- Trial (1955) - Courtroom Spectator (uncredited)
- Guys and Dolls (1955) - Singing Man in Barber Shop (uncredited)
- The Spoilers (1955) - Miner (uncredited)
- Mohawk (1956) - Settler (uncredited)
- Alfred Hitchcock Presents (1957) (Season 2 Episode 21: "Number Twenty-Two") - Prisoner Tyrone (uncredited)
- Crime of Passion (1957) - Boxing Spectator (uncredited)
- Designing Woman (1957) - One of Daylor's Boys in Bar (uncredited)
- Man of a Thousand Faces (1957) - Extra in Bullpen (uncredited)
- Chicago Confidential (1957) - Wellwisher at Wedding (uncredited)
- My Man Godfrey (1957) - Dockhand (uncredited)
- Hell Bound (1957) - Seaman (uncredited)
- Merry Andrew (1958) - Roustabout (uncredited)
- The Sheepman (1958) - Town Loafer (uncredited)
- The Decks Ran Red (1958) - Helmsman (uncredited)
- Frankenstein's Daughter (1958) - The Monster
- The Buccaneer (1958) - Pirate with Eye Patch (uncredited)
- Some Like It Hot (1959) - Spats's henchman #2
- Ocean's 11 (1960) (uncredited)
- Heller in Pink Tights (1960) - Cheyenne Townsman (uncredited)
- Bloodlust! (1961) - Trophy (uncredited)
- Pocketful of Miracles (1961) - Slop - Pretends to be Governor of Utah (uncredited)
- Sergeants 3 (1962) - Barfly (uncredited)
- Kid Galahad (1962) - Bailey Fight Spectator (uncredited)
- Pressure Point (1962) - Convict / Inmate (uncredited)
- How the West Was Won (1962) - Cattleman at Barricade (uncredited)
- Billy Rose's Jumbo (1962) - Roustabout (uncredited)
- Irma la Douce (1963) - Wedding Guest (uncredited)
- 4 for Texas (1963) - Red-Coated Waiter (uncredited)
- Robin and the 7 Hoods (1964) - Gisborne's Hood
- Dear Heart (1964) - Conventioneer (uncredited)
- The Greatest Story Ever Told (1965) (uncredited)
- The Hallelujah Trail (1965) - Miner (uncredited)
- The Great Race (1965) - Townsman (uncredited)
- The Money Trap (1965) - Man in Clinic (uncredited)
- The Cincinnati Kid (1965) - Spectator at Cockfight (uncredited) (final film role)
