= Fangs of the Wild =

Fangs of the Wild may refer to:

- Fangs of the Wild (1928 film), an American film directed by Jerome Storm
- Fangs of the Wild (1939 film), an American film directed by Bernard B. Ray
- Fangs of the Wild (1954 film), an American film directed by William F. Claxton
