= Frankenstein's Daughter =

1958 film by Richard E. Cunha

- Theatrical release poster
- Directed by: Richard E. Cunha
- Written by: H. E. Barrie
- Produced by: Marc Frederic; George Fowley
- Starring: Donald Murphy; Sandra Knight; John Ashley; Harold Lloyd Jr.
- Cinematography: Meredith Nicholson
- Edited by: Everett Dodd
- Music by: Nicholas Carras
- Distributed by: Astor Pictures
- Release date: December 15, 1958
- Running time: 85 minutes
- Country: United States
- Language: English
- Budget: $60,000 (estimated)

Frankenstein's Daughter is an independently made 1958 American black-and-white science fiction/horror film drama, produced by Marc Frederic and George Fowley, directed by Richard E. Cunha, that stars John Ashley, Sandra Knight, Donald Murphy, and Sally Todd. The film was distributed by Astor Pictures and was released theatrically on December 15, 1958 as a double feature with Missile to the Moon (1958).

The film, set in 1950s America, tells the story of the creation of the first female "Frankenstein's monster". The film bears little resemblance to the Frankenstein novel by Mary Shelley.

== Plot ==
Teenager Trudy Morton, who lives with her uncle Carter Morton, has nightmares in which she is a monster running about the streets. Her boyfriend Johnny Bruder dismisses them. Unbeknownst to Trudy, she actually does turn into a monster at night, thanks to Carter's lab assistant, Oliver Frank. He lives with them and has been spiking Trudy's fruit punch with the formula that he and Carter are developing at the home lab. Carter's goal is to eliminate all disease so that people can live forever. Oliver's goal is different: with the help of Elsu the gardener, he is assembling a "perfect being,” for Oliver Frank is actually Oliver Frankenstein, grandson of the original Dr. Frankenstein, and Elsu is his lab assistant.

Carter's project stalls and he breaks into Rockwell Labs for Digenerol, the chemical he needs for his experiments.

Police Lt. Boyle and Det. Bill Dillon investigate a report from a frightened woman that a monster in a swimsuit attacked her. They spot Trudy's monstrous self and fire at her, to no avail. Oliver grabs her and drags her home to recover.

The next morning, Carter asks Oliver if he has seen the newspaper story about a "Frankenstein monster" on the loose. Oliver scoffs at the story, but when Carter disparages the Frankensteins, Oliver jumps to his feet in their defense. Boyle and Dillon are visited by Mr. Rockwell of Rockwell Labs. Rockwell says the stolen Digenerol may be somehow related to the monster issue.

Back at the home lab, Elsu mistakenly enters through a secret door while Carter and Oliver are working. Oliver shoos him out and to distract Carter knocks the bottle of Digenerol from his hand, spilling every drop. Carter says he must now steal more Digenerol.

Trudy's friend Suzie Lawler visits her, and they quarrel. While flouncing off, she makes a date with Oliver. The date goes badly, with Oliver attempting to force himself on Suzie. Since he needs a brain for his creation, he runs Suzie over with his car, killing her. When Elsu asks why he wants to create this creature, Oliver says that "now we're aware the female mind is conditioned to a man's world. It therefore takes orders, where the other ones didn't."

While Oliver tries to reanimate the monster, Carter returns after stealing more Digenerol and nearly being shot by a warehouse guard. He is short of breath, having an angina attack and calling for help. Oliver sends Elsu out the back door, hurriedly locks up the lab and goes to assist Carter along with Trudy, who was awakened by the noises from Oliver’s reanimation equipment and Carter’s cries for help. As they usher Carter to his room, Oliver’s creation comes to life, scarred and unrecognizable. “She" escapes and kills a warehouse worker at a nearby freight depot. Another worker, Mack, calls the cops.

Later that evening, someone knocks on the front door of the Morton home. Trudy answers. It is the monster. Trudy screams and faints. Elsu coaxes the monster into the lab. When Johnny arrives to see Trudy, Oliver convinces him that Trudy has an overactive imagination.

Oliver wants the lab for himself and decides to kill Carter. As he starts strangling Carter, Boyle and Dillon show up to question Carter about the Digenerol. Oliver tells them Carter stole it; Carter tells them Oliver tried to kill him. Oliver persuades them that Carter is mentally ill, and they arrest Carter. After learning that Carter has been arrested, Johnny leaves for the police station while Trudy stays behind. Oliver reveals his family's name and shows her his creation. Trudy faints again, and Oliver prepares to transplant her brain into the monster. Elsu refuses to take part in this and threatens to go to the police if Oliver harms Trudy. Oliver has the monster kill him. While Oliver is distracted, Trudy awakens and goes to the police station, where she learns that Carter has died.

Boyle and Dillon return to the house to further question Oliver. When Boyle leaves, Dillon stays behind to keep an eye on Oliver. Dillon stumbles across the monster's hiding place and Oliver orders "her" to kill Dillon.

Trudy and Johnny come home and also find the hideout. Oliver orders "her" to kill them, too. "She" and Johnny fight in the lab. Johnny throws a vial of acid at "her", but hits Oliver instead, melting his face. As Oliver falls, the monster accidentally sets "herself" alight on a Bunsen burner. Trudy and Johnny flee as "she" is consumed by flames.

== Cast ==
- John Ashley as Johnny Bruder
- Sandra Knight as Trudy Morton
- Donald Murphy as Oliver Frank/Frankenstein
- Sally Todd as Suzie Lawler
- Harold Lloyd Jr. as Don
- Felix Locher as Carter Morton
- Wolfe Barzell as Elsu
- John Zaremba as Police Lt. Boyd
- Robert Dix as Police Det. Bill Dillon
- Harry Wilson as the Monster
- Voltaire Perkins as Mr. Rockwell
- Charlotte Portney as frightened woman
- Bill Coontz as first victim – warehouseman
- George Barrows as Mack
- Page Cavanaugh and His Trio

== Production ==
Layton Films was a company established by Dick Cunha, a filmmaker who had just left Screencraft Productions, and Mark Frederic, an investor. In April 1958 it was announced Layton would make 10 films in just over 24 months for distribution by Astor Films, starting with Frankenstein's Daughter (in the end only two other films were made, Missile to the Moon and The Girl in Room 13).

Frankenstein's Daughter was shot during just six days for approximately $65,000 and sold to Astor Pictures for $80,000.

It was filmed at Screencraft Studios in Hollywood, although the house in which much of the action takes place was the home of producer Marc Frederic. Production of the film wrapped in May 1958.

John Ashley had just made a number of films for American International Pictures. He later recalled "AIP was low budget – one hundred grand a movie – but at least they shot on sound stages and the size of the crew was bigger. Frankenstein's Daughter was really rock bottom. But the people were very nice, especially Dick Cunha, the director ... but it was quick, a little more down and dirty than AIP".

Ashley later said he remembered two things about the film: "the monster, which was a man because the makeup artist didn't know it was supposed to be a woman, and that we shot the ending at Harold Lloyd's estate, because Harold Lloyd Jr. played a teenager in it".

Although the credits use the words "and introducing" in reference to Harold Lloyd Jr., his first film role was actually 1953's The Flaming Urge. Sally Todd was Miss February 1957 in Playboy magazine.

Paul Stanhope and Harry Thomas did the make-up for Frankenstein's Daughter.

Additional production information can be found on the Tom Weaver-David Schecter-Steve Kronenberg-Larry Blamire audio commentary on Film Detective's 2021 "Frankenstein's Daughter" Special Edition Blu-ray.

== Release ==
=== Title ===
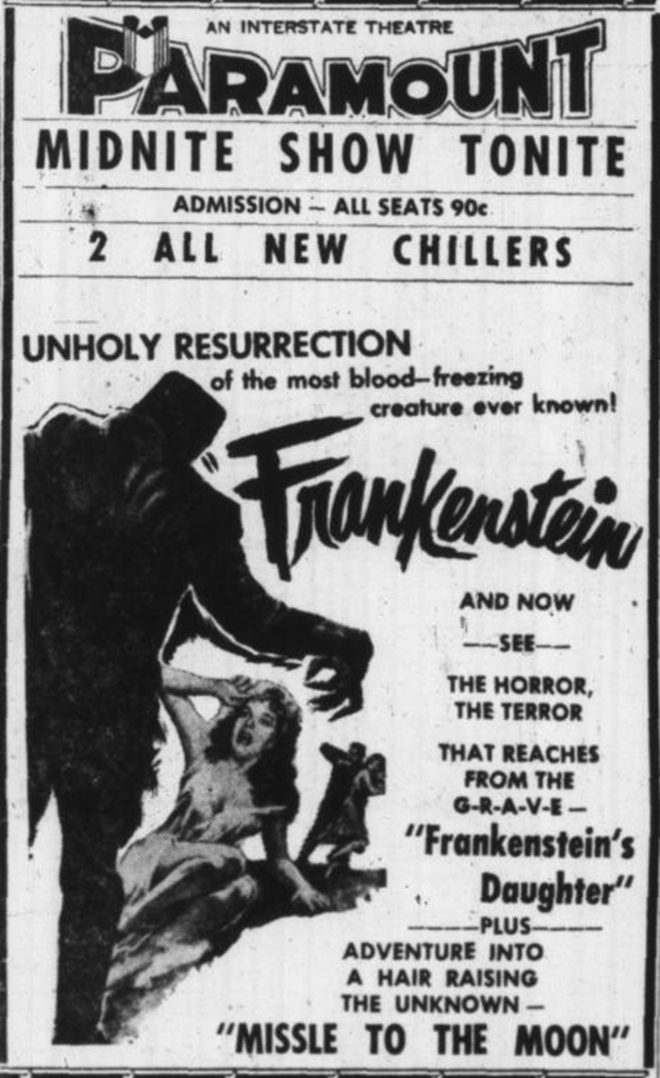
Advertisement from 1958 for Frankenstein's Daughter and co-feature, Missile to the Moon

Film critic Bill Warren notes that Frankenstein's Daughter was titled She Monster of the Night when it was available in 8 mm format and that it "may have been retitled 'The Wild Witch of Frankenstein' for a Chicago Theater." Although he does not name the theater or provide a reason for the change in title, he writes that other films were also retitled when they were shown in Chicago at about the same time. British critic Phil Hardy also refers to the film as "Frankenstein's Daughter a.k.a. She Monster of the Night."

=== Release date ===
The film's specific U.S. release date is somewhat confusing. Bill Warren gives the most specific release date as "December 15, 1958" in his research encyclopedia. (The American Film Institute (AFI) simply states that it was released in November 1958, while the Internet Movie Database (IMDb) gives a more precise date of November 15, 1958, for its New York City premiere.

Frankenstein's Daughter was released theatrically in Canada and West Germany in 1959, Mexico in 1960, and France in 1962, as well as on unspecified dates in Austria, Belgium, Brazil, Luxembourg, the Netherlands, Italy, Spain, and the UK. The film was distributed theatrically in Canada by Astral Films; by Sunderfilm Zwicker in West Germany; and by Benelux Films in Belgium, the Netherlands and Luxembourg. At some point, it played in the UK as the first feature on a double bill with The Giant Gila Monster. Frankenstein's Daughter was given an X-certificate by the British Board of Film Censors (BBFC), restricting its viewing to adults age 16 and over, while The Giant Gila Monster got an A-certificate, which meant that the film was considered more suitable for adults than children.

=== Clips ===
The film has been referred to, had clips from it used, or been shown in its entirety on television numerous times over the years. For example, it was referenced in the "Reluctant Hero" episode of the situation comedy My Secret Identity in February 1990. Clips from the film were used in the "Frankenstein's Friends" episode of 100 Years of Horror in December 1996 and in the Cinemassacre's Monster Madness episode "Dracula vs. Frankenstein" in October 2010. The entire film was shown on Frightmare Theater in May 2017.

Frankenstein's Daughter has also been included in at least one theatrical film series. In December 2011, it was shown, along with Lady Frankenstein, as part of Michael W. Phillip's "Shock Theater" film series, which specialized in showing 16 mm prints of "drive-in movie horror fare". The series ran on Friday nights at the Wicker Park Arts Center in Chicago.

Frankenstein's Daughter has been available in the U.S. for individual home viewing since 2000, when Vintage Video released it on VHS. Both Englewood Entertainment and Image Entertainment released it on DVD. Synergy Entertainment distributed the film worldwide on DVD starting in 2008, and it has been available in France on DVD from Bach Entertainment since 2009; It has been available in Spain on DVD from L'Atelier since 2009 and in Germany on DVD from Edel Media & Entertainment since 2013.

== Reception ==
=== Critical ===
The reviews written in 1958 and 1959 appear to show that critics did not like Frankenstein's Daughter. According to Warren, the film was "greeted by the few who reviewed it with the contempt it deserved". He notes that "the Los Angeles Examiner called the film 'a dismal clunker,'" while critic "Paul V. Beckley in the New York Herald-Tribune felt that it was 'a little better [than Missile to the Moon], although much more confusing". New York Times critic Howard Thompson wrote that "'it's a toss-up whether [Frankenstein's Daughter or its co-feature] Missile to the Moon is the cheaper, duller piece of claptrap. Both are horror movies, being simply horrible bores'." gross magazine in its "Review Digest" for the February 9, 1959, issue gave the film a rating of "fair" and recorded a "poor" rating from the New York Daily News.

Modern-day critics generally think poorly of the film. Hardy calls it "a decidedly shoddy teenage monster movie ... weighed down by the usual scenes of teenage partying" and eventually ending with a "routine conflagration when the required running time has been reached". Also taking note of the "teenage partying" segments of the film, critic Robert Horton writes that the pool-party song-and-dance numbers give viewers a "Z-movie view of Eisenhower America" and that "Frankenstein's Daughter blends early rock movie devices (lover's lane, nightclub combo) with an old-school monster story". But the Austin (Texas) Chronicle's film critic, Mike Emery, has a more favorable perspective. He calls the film "not bad for an evening of nostalgia and laughs. Not to mention a reminder of an era when fun 'creature features' were cranked out by the dozen".

Warren dislikes the monster makeup worn by Harry Wilson and the gender confusion that results from a man playing Frankenstein's daughter. He writes that "it's never clear if the monster is entirely a female – it certainly doesn't look like a woman – or has the body of a man and the head of a woman ... we never know if the monster is male, female, or a mixture – or why that would make any difference". He blames much of this on the monster makeup, writing that "when he learned at the last moment the monster was supposed to be a woman, [makeup artist Harry] Thomas hastily scrawled lipstick on its mouth and sent it on to movie immortality". In an interview, Cuhna laid the blame for the makeup not on Harry Thomas, but on a short shooting schedule and low budget, telling critic Tom Weaver that "it was a situation where we just got trapped, again, without any money. We had no preparation time, and Frankenstein's Daughter was designed on the set on the first day of shooting ... we just didn't have enough money to create a monster that would represent Sally Todd. Thomas told Weaver in a separate interview that he "wanted to make Sally Todd up as the monster, but the producers didn't think she was big enough to fight and look menacing".

Critic Bryan Senn says that "though there's much to scoff at in this gender-bending cheapie, director Cuhna and cinematographer Meredith Nicholson at least try to invest the proceedings with some visual interest, utilizing shadows, depth of field, and even change of focus within a shot to bring a character into sharp relief at a dramatic moment". Those attempts do not sound entirely successful, though. Hardy writes that Nicholson's "shadowy lighting, however, can't fully disguise the few cramped studio sets and banal exteriors ... and so the picture possesses a cheap, claustrophobic feel".

The acting has drawn mixed reviews. While Emery writes that the film is "filled with awful acting and even worse rock & roll dance numbers", when it comes to a major character, "Dr. Frankenstein was never slimier than when he was portrayed by Donald Murphy". He describes Oliver as "part mad scientist, part Ivy League jerk" and says that he is "one of the more lecherous and humorous characters to bear the legendary doctor's name". Senn is also favorable toward Murphy's acting, writing that he "gives a hearty performance as the arrogant, brilliant Oliver. He imbues his scornful scientist with a superior air and a wealth of passion". On the other hand, "hero John Ashley's toneless playing adds to the production's woes. His deadpan delivery and immobile countenance are so stiff you could light a match on them".

Diabolique magazine wrote that Ashley "gives a solid leading man performance... it's not particularly memorable work but is grounded and realistic, and serves as a useful counter-balance to the extreme nature of the story."

The director said the film was his "biggest disappointment ... because of our monster creator; I can't blame anyone for that, we just didn't have enough money to create a monster that would represent Sally Todd".

Currently, the film has a 3.8/10 rating on the Internet Movie Database, with 647 ratings, 36 user reviews and 12 external reviews. At the film review aggregator website Rotten Tomatoes, there are no ratings from professional critics and only 14 reviews from the general audience. 20 percent of the audience says it likes Frankenstein's Daughter and gives the film an average rating of 2.5/5, based on 315 viewers.

== Music ==
Page Cavanaugh and His Trio performed the song "Special Date" on-screen during the film and with Harold Lloyd Jr. providing the vocals, a second song, titled "Daddy Bird". The latter was released in 1958 by Surf Records as the A-side of a 45-rpm single, with "Grind Me a Pound" on the B-side. Lloyd is credited on the record as Duke Lloyd. A CD of instrumental music from the soundtracks of Missile to the Moon and Frankenstein's Daughter, simply titled MIssile to the Moon/Frankenstein's Daughter, was released in October 2012 by Monstrous Movie Music. The "marvelous-but-unheralded composer and orchestrator, Nicholas Carras" scored each film in 1958 for between $9000 and $10,000.

== See also ==
- List of American films of 1958
