= Count Three and Pray (film) =

1955 film by George Sherman

- Theatrical release poster
- Directed by: George Sherman
- Written by: Herb Meadow
- Produced by: Ted Richmond
- Starring: Van Heflin; Joanne Woodward; Philip Carey; Raymond Burr
- Cinematography: Burnett Guffey
- Edited by: William A. Lyon
- Music by: George Duning
- Color process: Technicolor
- Production company: Copa Productions
- Distributed by: Columbia Pictures
- Release date: October 1955
- Running time: 102 minutes
- Country: United States
- Language: English

Count Three and Pray is a 1955 American CinemaScope Western film directed by George Sherman and starring Van Heflin and Joanne Woodward in her first feature film. It was based on the story "Calico Pony" (also the working title of the film) by Herb Meadow. It premiered in Woodward's home town, Greenville, South Carolina, at the Paris Theatre.

== Plot ==
Former brawler and womanizer Luke Fargo returns from the American Civil War to his Southern hometown a greatly changed man. Following his traumatic experience at the Battle of Vicksburg, he has become a minister, intent on rebuilding the town's only church, which burned down. He is greeted with disbelief by his friends, including Matty, and with outright hostility by the rest of the townsfolk, as he fought on the Union side. Particularly opposed to him is Yancey Huggins, who sees a threat to his iron-fisted control of the town. Huggins gets the aptly named Big to fight Fargo, but Fargo wins.

Fargo encounters two very different women from his past. Southern belle Georgina Descrais, impoverished by the war, tries to revive their romantic relationship, but he is not interested. Local madam Selma (an uncredited Jean Willes) is pleased by his return and accepts him on his own terms. Meanwhile, teenage orphan tomboy Lissy, who has been living in the parsonage, initially dislikes him, but gradually her feelings undergo a reversal. She continues residing there, which causes Fargo a great deal of trouble, as the townspeople, aroused by Huggins, suspect him of falling back on his old scandalous ways. He does not help matters when he reluctantly gambles on a Sunday with prosperous businessman Albert Loomis, winning a horse race to obtain lumber for the church, and is goaded into fighting Yancey's men.

Finally, the bishop is called in to resolve the situation. He learns that Fargo, not knowing any better, had not been ordained. After hearing how much good Fargo has done in the community, the bishop makes him a real minister and then tries to get him to marry Lissy. When Fargo proves reluctant, the exasperated Lissy hands the bishop her rifle to prod the hesitant (though not unwilling) groom.

== Cast ==
- Van Heflin as Luke Fargo
- Joanne Woodward as Lissy
- Philip Carey as Albert Loomis
- Raymond Burr as Yancey Huggins
- Allison Hayes as Georgina Decrais
- Myron Healey as Floyd Miller
- Nancy Kulp as Matty Miller
- James Griffith as Swallow
- Richard Webb as Big
- Kathryn Givney as Mrs. Decrais, Georgina's mother
- Robert Burton as Bishop
- Jean Willes as Selma (uncredited)

== See also ==
- List of American films of 1955
