= Charles Chaplin Jr. =

American actor (1925–1968)

- Chaplin c. 1960
- Born: Charles Spencer Chaplin III; May 5, 1925; Beverly Hills, California, U.S.
- Died: March 20, 1968 (aged 42); Los Angeles, California, U.S.
- Burial place: Hollywood Forever Cemetery
- Education: Black-Foxe Military Institute; Lawrenceville School
- Occupation: Actor
- Spouses: Susan Magness (m. 1958; div. 1959) Marta Brown (m. 1962, divorced)
- Children: 1
- Parent(s): Charlie Chaplin; Lita Grey
- Relatives: See Chaplin family

Charles Spencer Chaplin III (May 5, 1925 – March 20, 1968), known professionally as Charles Chaplin Jr., was an American actor. He was the elder son of Charlie Chaplin and Lita Grey, and is known for appearing in 1950s films such as The Beat Generation and Fangs of the Wild.

== Early life ==
Chaplin was born in Beverly Hills, California. He was the elder son of actors Charlie Chaplin and Lita Grey. His half-siblings from his father's last marriage to Oona O'Neill are Geraldine, Michael, Josephine, Victoria, Eugene, Jane, Annette, and Christopher. His elder half-brother, Norman, died as an infant.

As young children, he and his younger brother, Sydney, were used as pawns in their mother's bitter divorce from Charlie Chaplin, during which a lot of the couple's "dirty linen" was aired in public, sensational divorce hearings. Following the divorce, the brothers were raised by their mother and maternal grandmother until the mid-1930s, when they began to make frequent visits to their father.

Chaplin attended the Black-Foxe Military Institute in Hollywood and the Lawrenceville School in Lawrenceville, New Jersey. He served in the U.S. Army in Europe during World War II.

== Career ==
Chaplin acted in 13 films, appearing with his father in Limelight (1952). In 1959, he had a role in the film Girls Town which featured the son of another famous silent movie comedian, Harold Lloyd Jr. He appeared with his brother Sydney in the play Ethan Frome at the Circle Theatre, now named El Centro Theatre. In 1960, he wrote a book about his family life titled My Father, Charlie Chaplin.

== Death ==
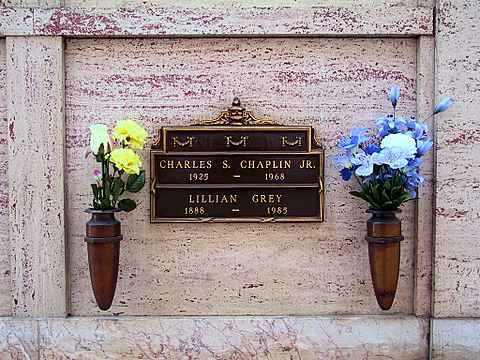
Grave of Charles Chaplin III

Chaplin died of a pulmonary embolism on March 20, 1968, in Santa Monica, California, aged 42. He is buried in the Abbey of the Psalms mausoleum at the Hollywood Forever Cemetery with his maternal grandmother Lillian Carrillo Curry Grey.

== In popular culture ==
In the 2022 Netflix film Blonde, Chaplin was portrayed by Xavier Samuel.

== Filmography ==
=== Film ===
Year	Title	Role	Notes
1940	The Great Dictator	Child in crowd	Uncredited; extra in the ghetto scenes
1952	Limelight	Clown	Uncredited; appearance with father Charlie Chaplin and brother Sydney Earl Chaplin
1954	Fangs of the Wild	Roger Wharton	Starring role; also known as Follow the Hunter
1954	Columbus entdeckt Krähwinkel	Jimmy Hunter	German production; released in the US as Columbus Discovers America
1954	Screen Snapshots: Hollywood's Invisible Committees	Himself	Documentary short film (Vol. 33, No. 8)
1955	The Court-Martial of Billy Mitchell	Reporter	Uncredited; directed by Otto Preminger
1957	Outer Space Jitters	Sputnik	A The Three Stooges short film
1958	The High Cost of Loving	Guest at Party	Uncredited; directed by José Ferrer
1958	High School Confidential!	Quinn	Directed by Jack Arnold
1959	Night of the Quarter Moon	Young Thug	Uncredited; also known as Between the Thunder and the Sun
1959	The Big Operator	Bill Tragg	Directed by Charles F. Haas
1959	Girls Town	Joe Cates	Also starring Mamie Van Doren
1959	The Beat Generation	Lover Boy	Produced by Albert Zugsmith
1959	The Big Night	Charles	UK title: Dark Cloud
1960	Sex Kittens Go to College	Fire Chief	Also known as The Beauty and the Robot
1961	The George Raft Story	Young Actor	Uncredited; biographical film about George Raft

=== Television ===
Year	Title	Role	Notes
1955	Adventures of Wild Bill Hickok	Russell	Episode: "The Outlaw's Portrait" (S6.E5)
1955	The Spike Jones Show	Himself	Guest appearance (1 episode)
1956	General Electric Summer Originals	Host / Actor	Episode: "The Eternal Question"
1957	Matinee Theatre	Guest	Episode: "The Man with the Pointed Toes"
1957	Telephone Time	Vinnie	Episode: "Vinnie the Redhead" (S2.E27)
1959	The David Niven Show	Young Man	Episode: "The Last Act" (S1.E13)
1960	The Ed Sullivan Show	Himself	Guest / Interviewee (S13.E28)

== Bibliography ==
- My Father, Charlie Chaplin (1960), co-written with N. and M. Rau. New York: Random House.
