= Girls Town (1959 film) =

- Girls Town movie poster
- Directed by: Charles F. Haas
- Written by: Robert Hardy Andrews; Robert Smith
- Produced by: Albert Zugsmith
- Starring: Mamie Van Doren; Mel Tormé; Ray Anthony; Maggie Hayes; Paul Anka; Cathy Crosby; Gigi Perreau; Elinor Donahue; Gloria Talbott; Sheilah Graham; Jim Mitchum; Dick Contino; Harold Lloyd Jr. Charles Chaplin Jr. The Platters
- Cinematography: John L. Russell
- Edited by: Leon Barsha
- Music by: Van Alexander
- Distributed by: Metro-Goldwyn-Mayer
- Release date: October 5, 1959
- Running time: 89 minutes
- Country: United States
- Language: English
- Budget: $457,000
- Box office: $875,000

Girls Town is a 1959 American drama film directed by Charles F. Haas and starring Mamie Van Doren, Mel Tormé, and Ray Anthony. Paul Anka also appears in his first acting role. Van Doren stars as a juvenile delinquent who is sent to a girls' school run by nuns, where she finds herself unable to help her sister. The film capitalizes on the 1950s rebellious-teen exploitation films, with catfights, car races, music from Anka and The Platters, and sexy outfits.

The supporting cast includes the offspring of two major silent cinema stars: Charles Chaplin Jr. and Harold Lloyd Jr. Also featured is James Mitchum (son of Robert Mitchum) and (as a nun) gossip columnist Sheilah Graham. Elinor Donahue of Father Knows Best also acted in the film. A year after making it she said: "I would just as soon forget the whole thing. In the first five minutes of the picture it was established that I was a good girl, being pushed into being a bad girl. The rest of the picture I spent doing practically nothing but crying and saying, 'Help me, help me!' It was fun making it, but it was an awful picture."

Girls Town was lampooned in July 1994 on movie-mocking television series Mystery Science Theater 3000. About 15 minutes of the actual film were cut from this version.

== Plot ==
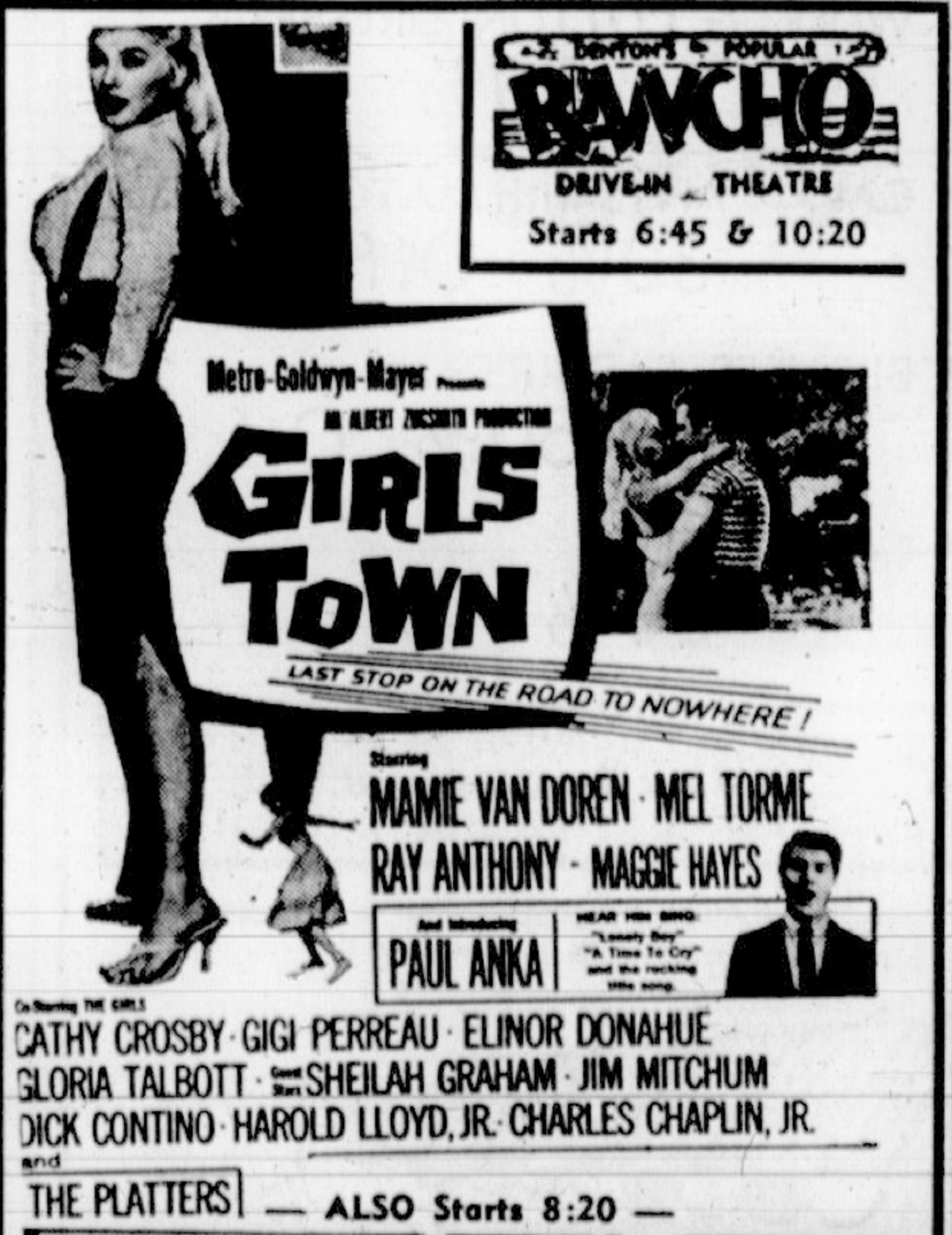
Drive-in advertisement from 1959

The movie opens with a young woman fending off an attempted rape. In the process, the would-be rapist accidentally falls off a cliff to his death. Circumstantial evidence places 16-year-old delinquent Silver at the scene, and she is sent to Girls Town, a rehabilitation village run by a group of nuns. There, she lives with Serafina and some experienced juvenile delinquents. Trouble and misunderstandings ensue. Troublemaker Fred saw the cliff incident from a distance and realizes it was actually Silver's sister, Mary Lee, who was there. Fred blackmails Mary Lee into being his partner in deadly "hands-off drag racing", then prepares to take her to Tijuana to sell her into the slave trade. Silver finally wins the respect of her Girls Town friends, and finally they rescue Mary Lee.

A subplot involves delusional Serafina believing famous teen idol Jimmy is in love with her. During the film, he sings "Lonely Boy", "It's Time to Cry", "Girls Town Blues", and "Ave Maria". A scene set in a nightclub features The Platters singing "Wish It Were Me".

== Cast ==
- Mamie Van Doren as Silver Morgan
- Mel Tormé as Fred Alger
- Ray Anthony as Dick Culdane
- Margaret Hayes as Mother Veronica (billed as Maggie Hayes)
- Paul Anka as Jimmy Parlow
- Cathy Crosby as Singer
- Gigi Perreau as Serafina
- Elinor Donahue as Mary Lee Morgan
- Gloria Talbott as Vida
- Sheilah Graham as Sister Grace
- James Mitchum as Charley (billed as Jim Mitchum)
- Dick Contino as Stan Joyce
- Harold Lloyd Jr. as Chip Gardner
- Charles Chaplin Jr. as Joe Cates
- The Platters as Themselves
- Peggy Moffitt as Flo
- Peter Leeds as Michael Clyde
- Norman Grabowski as Skin (billed as Grabowski)
- Jody Fair as Gloria Barker
- Nan Peterson as Carhop

== Box office ==
According to MGM records, the film earned $375,000 in the US and Canada and $500,000 elsewhere, resulting in a loss of $65,000.

== Censorship ==
When Girls Town was first released in Italy in 1960, the Committee for the Theatrical Review of the Italian Ministry of Cultural Heritage and Activities imposed the removal of the scene in which Silver is showering while singing "Hey Mama" because it was considered to be offensive to decency. The official document number is 32004; it was signed on June 1, 1960, by Minister Domenico Magrì.

== Mystery Science Theater 3000 ==
Girls Town was featured in episode number 601 of Mystery Science Theater 3000. The episode debuted July 16, 1994, on Comedy Central. The episode featured the debut of the Umbilicus, a tube or tether connecting the Satellite of Love, where Mike Nelson and his robot pals watched the movie, with Deep 13, where the evil scientists who sent him the movies worked and lived.

The episode was ranked number 72 on the Top 100 list of episodes as voted upon by MST3K Season 11 Kickstarter backers. Writer Jim Vorel ranked the episode much higher, placing it at number 20 (out of 191 total MST3K episodes). Vorel laughs at the casting of Mel Tormé (then aged 33) as the movie's antagonist, although he appreciates Mamie Van Doren's beauty, even if she were years older than the juvenile delinquent she was supposed to be playing. Vorel calls the movie "one of the more inherently watchable dramas ever featured on the show".

The MST3K version of Girls Town was included as part of the Mystery Science Theater 3000, Volume XXXIX DVD collection, released by Shout! Factory in November 21, 2017. The other episodes in the four-disc set include The Amazing Transparent Man (episode #623) and Diabolik (episode #1013). The fourth disc, titled "Satellite Dishes", collected non-movie segments from MST3K episodes that are unlikely to be collected on DVD.

== See also ==
- List of American films of 1959
