= Arthur Batanides =

American actor (1923–2000)

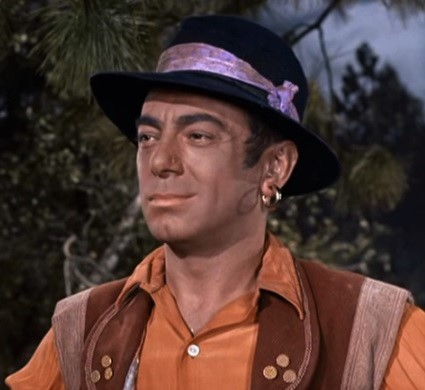
- Batanides in a 1960 Bonanza episode
- Born: April 9, 1923; Tacoma, Washington, U.S.
- Died: January 10, 2000 (aged 76); Los Angeles, California, U.S.
- Occupation: Actor
- Years active: 1951–1989
- Spouses: Anne Rasmussen, 1967–? (divorced, 2 children); Midge Ware, 1954–? (divorced, 2 children)
- Children: Leslie (daughter), Jason (son) both with Ware; Ann-Charlotte (daughter), Nikos (son), both with Rasmussen

Arthur Batanides (April 9, 1923 – January 10, 2000) was an American film and television actor, originally from Tacoma, Washington.

== Life and career ==
Arthur Batanides was born in Tacoma, Washington on April 9, 1923. He became enamored with acting after performing stand-up routines in front of fellow GIs in Europe during World War II. He was educated in dramatic art at the Actors' Lab in Los Angeles, followed by extensive stage experience.

Batanides guest starred in such series as Crusader, Tombstone Territory, Zorro, Combat!, The Twilight Zone, The Asphalt Jungle, One Step Beyond, Blue Light, Lost in Space, Mission: Impossible, The Silent Force, I Spy, The Dick Van Dyke Show, The Wild Wild West, Alfred Hitchcock Presents, Bearcats!, The Odd Couple, The Andy Griffith Show, Bonanza, Columbo and Happy Days. He appeared as Bill Golding in the season six, 1963 episode of Perry Mason titled "The Case of the Shoplifter's Shoe". He played Littleboy Sherman in The Rifleman S5 E24 "Old Man Running" which aired March 17, 1963.

One of his more recognizable roles was that of the unfortunate Starfleet officer/geologist D'Amato in the Star Trek episode "That Which Survives". Among his film credits are The Unearthly (1957), Violent Road (1958), The Leech Woman (1960), Man-Trap (1961), The Maltese Bippy (1969), Evil Roy Slade (1972) and Brannigan (1975). He also appeared as Mr. Kirkland in four of the Police Academy film series, and the sixth installment (City Under Siege) was his final acting appearance.

Batanides died in Los Angeles, California on January 10, 2000, at the age of 76.

== Filmography ==
Year	Title	Role	Notes
1954	Black Tuesday	Reporter at Electrocution	Uncredited
1956	The Ten Commandments	Hebrew at Rameses' Gate / Hebrew at Golden Calf	Uncredited
1957	The Unearthly	Danny Green	
1958	Violent Road	Ben	
1959	Cry Tough	Alvears	
1960	The Leech Woman	Jerry	
1960	Spartacus	Legionnaire	Uncredited
1961	Man-Trap	Cortez	
1969	The Maltese Bippy	Tony	
1972	The Cat Ate the Parakeet	Marty	
1975	Brannigan	Angell	
1985	Police Academy 2: Their First Assignment	Mr. Kirkland	
1986	Police Academy 3: Back in Training	Mr. Kirkland	
1987	Police Academy 4: Citizens on Patrol	Mr. Kirkland	
1989	Police Academy 6: City Under Siege	Mr. Kirkland	(final film role)

== Selected television ==
Year	Title	Role	Notes
1956	Crusader	Jack Gilliam	Season 2 Episode 2: "Expose"
1957	Maverick	Norman Brock	Season 1 Episode 14: "Comstock Conspiracy"
1957	Tombstone Territory	Tee-A-Hah	Season 1 Episode 9: "Apache Vendetta"
1958	Peter Gunn	Gus Triano	Season 1 Episode 8: "Rough Buck"
1958	Alfred Hitchcock Presents	Police Sergeant	Season 4 Episode 3: "The Jokester"
1959	Alfred Hitchcock Presents	Police Detective	Season 4 Episode 23: "I'll Take Care of You"
1959	Rawhide	Beckstrom	Season 2 Episode 10: "Incident of the Valley in Shadow"
1959	Yancy Derringer	Dink Saxon	Episode: "A Game of Chance"
1959	The Twilight Zone	Leader	Season 1 Episode 3: "Mr. Denton on Doomsday"
1959	Zorro	Lazaro	Season 2 Episode 14: "The Runaways"
1960	Bonanza	Spiro	Season 1 Episode 31: "Dark Star"
1961	Bonanza	Pablo	Season 2 Episode 20: "The Fugitive"
1961	The Twilight Zone	Tabal	Season 3 Episode 6: "The Mirror"
1961	The Asphalt Jungle	Morrison	Season 1 Episode 6: "The Last Way Out"
1961	Rawhide	Gypsy	Season 3 Episode 27: "Incident Before Black Pass"
1963	Perry Mason	Bill Golding	Season 6 Episode 13: "The Case of the Shoplifter's Shoe"
1963	Combat!	Nader	Season 2 Episode 4: "The Long Way Home: Part 1"
1963	Combat!	Nader	Season 2 Episode 5: "The Long Way Home: Part 2"
1963	The Dick Van Dyke Show	Man in Bar	Season 2 Episode 28: "Divorce"
1963	The Dick Van Dyke Show	Bernard	Season 3 Episode 9: "Big Max Calvada"
1964	The Dick Van Dyke Show	Arnold	Season 3 Episode 29: "Dear Mrs. Petrie, Your Husband Is in Jail"
1964	The Dick Van Dyke Show	Harry Tinker	Season 4 Episode 8: "The Alan Brady Show Goes to Jail"
1964	The Fugitive	Wimpy	Season 1 Episode 19: "Search in a Windy City"
1964	The Andy Griffith Show	Ralph Neal	Season 5 Episode 6: "Barney's Bloodhound"
1964	Gunsmoke	Harv Foster	Season 10 Episode 4: "The Violators"
1965	Gunsmoke	Feeter Kreb	Season 11 Episode 5: "Taps for Old Jeb"
1965	Gomer Pyle, U.S.M.C.	Jo-Jo	Season 1 Episode 28: "Sergeant of the Guard"
1965	The Wild Wild West	Marius Ascoli	Season 1 Episode 8: "The Night of the Dancing Death"
1966	Get Smart	KAOS Agent #1	Season 1 Episode 16: "Double Agent"
1966	The Man from U.N.C.L.E.	Mohan Kiru	Season 3 Episode 7: "The Thor Affair"
1966	Blue Light	Perault	Season 1 Episode 15: "The Key to the Code"
1966	Death Valley Days	Serbulo Varella	Season 14 Episode 22: "The Firebrand"
1966	I Spy	Rocco	Season 2 Episode 11: "To Florence with Love: Part 1"
1966	I Spy	Rocco	Season 2 Episode 12: "To Florence with Love: Part 2"
1967	The Wild Wild West	Scullen	Season 2 Episode 18: "The Night of the Gypsy Peril"
1967	Gomer Pyle, U.S.M.C.	Fugitive	Season 3 Episode 16: "Gomer the Recruiter"
1967	Lost in Space	Rangah	Season 3 Episode 5: "The Space Primevals"
1967	The Green Hornet	Shugo	Season 1 Episode 24: "Invasion from Outer Space: Part 1"
1967	The Green Hornet	Shugo	Season 1 Episode 25: "Invasion from Outer Space: Part 2"
1967	Mission: Impossible	Tino	Season 1 Episode 17: "The Frame"
1968	Gomer Pyle, U.S.M.C.	Bronson	Season 4 Episode 18: "Gomer Goes Home"
1968	The Wild Wild West	Sergeant	Season 3 Episode 24: "The Night of the Death-Maker"
1968	The Wild Wild West	Pylo	Season 4 Episode 12: "The Night of Miguelito's Revenge"
1968	Land of the Giants	Luigi	Season 1 Episode 5: "Terror-Go-Round"
1969	Gomer Pyle, U.S.M.C.	Ziggy	Season 5 Episode 14: "Two on the Bench"
1969	Mission: Impossible	Kura	Season 3 Episode 17: "Doomsday"
1969	Mission: Impossible	Father Paolo Dominguin	Season 4 Episode 6: "Commandante"
1969	Star Trek	Starfleet Officer / Geologist D'Amato	Season 3 Episode 17: "That Which Survives"
1970	Daniel Boone	Chief Tekwatana	Season 6 Episode 21: "Readin', Ritin', and Revolt"
1970	The Silent Force	Bates	Season 1 Episode 10: "Take as Directed for Death"
1970	Mission: Impossible	Lieutenant Kappelo	Season 5 Episode 11: "The Rebel" (uncredited)
1971	Mission: Impossible	Valenkoff	Season 5 Episode 22: "The Party"
1971	Hawaii Five-O	Consul	Season 3 Episode 20: "The Gunrunner"
1971	Bearcats!	Hopkins	Season 1 Episode 11: "The Big Guns"
1972	Mission: Impossible	Joe Fort	Season 6 Episode 16: "Stone Pillow"
1972	The Odd Couple	Pat the Bartender	Season 3 Episode 8: "Felix's First Commercial"
1973	The Odd Couple	Nino Babaloni	Season 3 Episode 17: "Myrna's Debut"
1973	Mannix	Emmett Trask	Season 6 Episode 16: "The Man Who Wasn't There"
1974	The Odd Couple	Mr. Hoffman - Plaintiff Lawyer	Season 4 Episode 22: "One for the Bunny"
1974	Happy Days	Eddie	Season 1 Episode 8: "The Skin Game"
1974	Columbo	Murph	Season 3 Episode 6: "Mind Over Mayhem"
1976	Happy Days	Louie	Season 4 Episode 9: "The Muckrakers"
1978	Wonder Woman	Krug (as Art Batanides)	Season 2 Episode 16: "Death in Disguise"
1978	Happy Days	The Claw	Season 6 Episode 10: "The Claw Meets the Fonz"
1978	Wonder Woman	Maxwell	Season 3 Episode 11: "Pot of Gold"
1979	The Misadventures of Sheriff Lobo	Max	Season 1 Episode 8: "The Senator Votes Absentee"
1980	The Misadventures of Sheriff Lobo	Pickpocket Francis	Season 1 Episode 21: "Mystery on the Orly Express"
1980	Happy Days	Eddie	Season 7 Episode 23: "A Potsie Is Born"
1983	Happy Days	Referee	Season 11 Episode 6: "Glove Story"
1985	Knight Rider	Henry Quincy	Season 4 Episode 8: "Many Happy Returns"
