= Allison Hayes =

American actress and model (1930–1977)

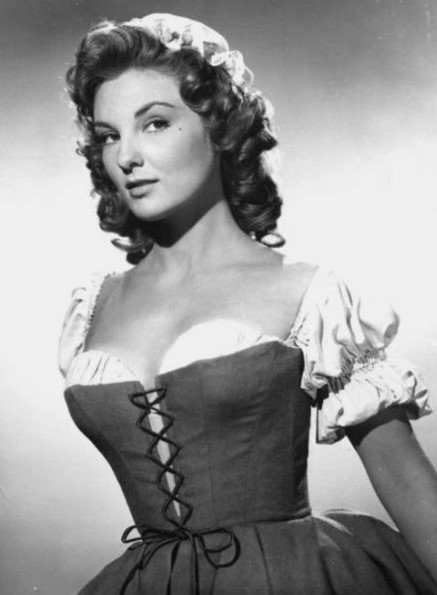
- Hayes in Mohawk (1956)
- Born: Mary Jane Hayes; March 6, 1930; Charleston, West Virginia, U.S.
- Died: February 27, 1977 (aged 46); San Diego, California, U.S.
- Burial place: Holy Cross Cemetery, Culver City; Mother of Sorrows, Lot 618, section N, grave 1 GPS (lat/lon): 33.99248, -118.38374
- Education: Calvin Coolidge High School
- Occupations: Actress; model; advocate
- Years active: 1954–1967
- Known for: Count Three and Pray; Gunslinger; Attack of the 50 Foot Woman; Mohawk; The Undead; The Steel Jungle
- Title: Miss District of Columbia 1949

Allison Hayes (born Mary Jane Hayes; March 6, 1930 – February 27, 1977) was an American film and television actress and model.

== Early life ==
Mary Jane Hayes was born to William F. Hayes, chief engineer of the Navy Department's Bureau of Ordnance and Charlotte Gibson Hayes} in Charleston, West Virginia. In 1948 she graduated from Calvin Coolidge High School. Hayes won the title of Miss District of Columbia in August 1949. She represented D.C. in the 1949 Miss America pageant. Although she did not win the competition, it provided her with the opportunity to work in local television before moving to Hollywood to work for Universal Pictures in 1954.

== Career ==
Before Hayes became an actress, she was a model with the Phyllis Bell agency in Washington, D. C.

A social function led to Hayes's working in films. After the secretary to the Peruvian embassy escorted Hayes to an event, he sent her picture to Universal. A screen test resulted in a contract and a change of her name to Allison Hayes.

Hayes made her film debut in the 1954 comedy Francis Joins the WACS. Her second film, Sign of the Pagan, provided her with an important role in a relatively minor film. Opposite Jack Palance, she played the part of a bewitching woman. Despite the strength of her second film role, she played minor roles in her next few films. Originally cast in Foxfire (1955 film), she was removed from the film during a lawsuit filed against Universal Pictures for injuries, including broken ribs, that she had sustained during the filming of Sign of the Pagan. Released from her contract, she was signed by Columbia Pictures in 1955.

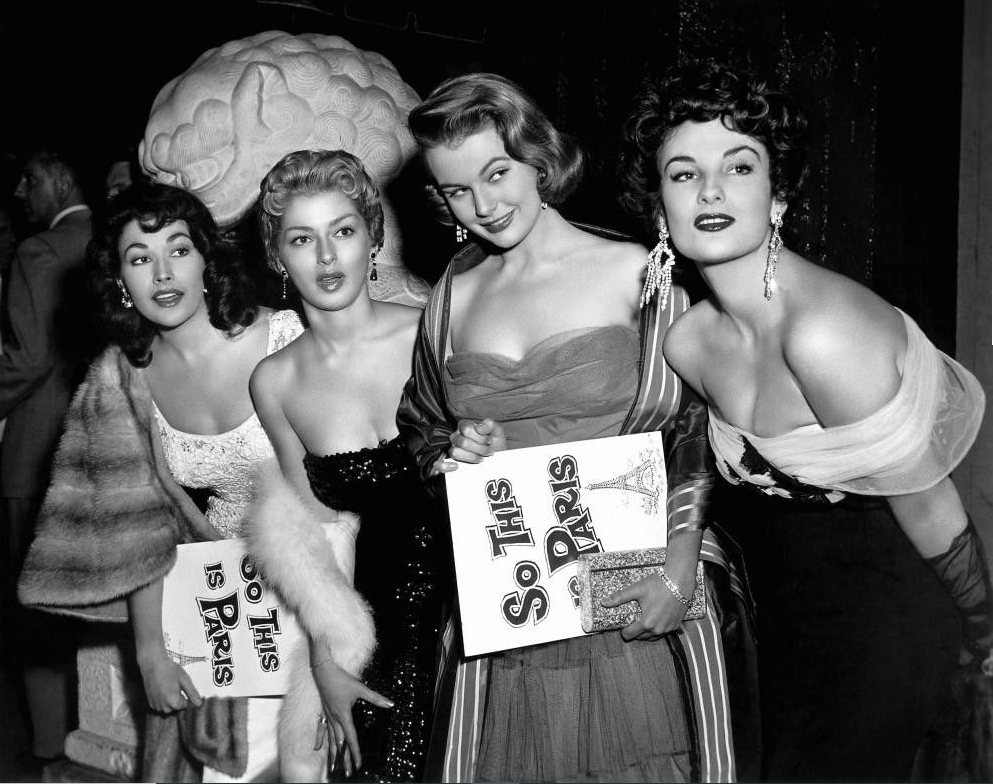
From left to right, Mara Corday, Kathleen Hughes, Myrna Hansen, and Hayes in So This Is Paris (1954)

In Chicago Syndicate, her first film for Columbia, Hayes played Joyce Kern – alias Sue Morton – who seeks vengeance for the death of her father at the hand of local gangster Arnie Valent. Count Three and Pray gave her the role that she later described as the best of her career. Hayes played with Van Heflin, co-starring with Raymond Burr and Joanne Woodward in her debut. As an arrogant Southern belle, she was in love with Heflin, returning from the Civil War as a minister. After being spurned by him, Hayes is reduced to becoming Burr's live-in "housekeeper". Hayes had several well-played dramatic scenes. However, when the film was released much of the attention of reviewers was focused on Woodward, and Hayes was largely ignored. She appeared in films such as The Steel Jungle, Mohawk, and Gunslinger (all 1956), but a fall from a horse during the filming of the latter left Hayes with a broken arm and unable to work. After she recovered, she began appearing in supporting roles in television productions.

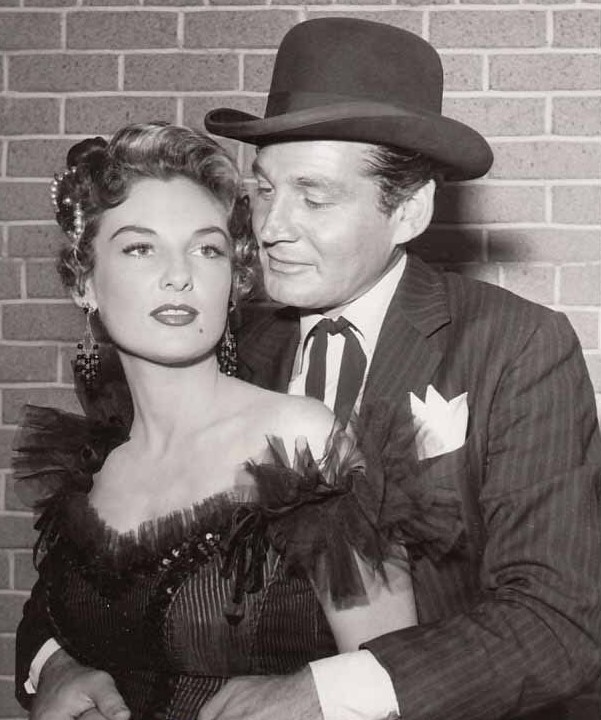
Hayes with Gene Barry in Bat Masterson (1958).

In 1958, she played in several B movies, including Wolf Dog as well as taking the lead role in Attack of the 50 Foot Woman, where she plays the part of an abused socialite who grows to giant size because of an alien encounter. In this film, she starred with Yvette Vickers and William Hudson, and it is probably her best-known role. The film did not lead to better roles, though she remained constantly employed and found work as a model. During 1963 and 1964, she played a continuing role in General Hospital but by this time her movie career was virtually over.

In 1958, she appeared in the recurring role of Ellie Winters, poker dealer/secret agent, in seven episodes of the western series Bat Masterson starring Gene Barry. In 1959, she was cast in season 2, episode 7 of Rawhide as Rose Morton. A close friend of Raymond Burr since filming Count Three and Pray, she made five guest appearances on Perry Mason during this time, including the role of Pearl Chute in the 1962 episode "The Case of the Bogus Books".

In 1964, Hayes began to experience severe health problems, including periods of fatigue, weakness, and dizziness, and her acting career declined. Her usually good-natured personality began to change and she became emotional and volatile, making it difficult for her to secure acting work. She was given a minor role in the 1965 Elvis Presley film Tickle Me, and made her final appearance in a guest role on Gomer Pyle, U.S.M.C. in 1967.

== Later years and death ==
By 1967, Hayes was unable to walk without a cane, which ended her acting career. Hayes later said that the pain of her illness caused her to contemplate suicide, and that her doctors did not take her symptoms seriously. Reading a medical book about the metal poisoning of factory workers, Hayes recognized the symptoms described as being similar to her own. Hayes began to question the ingredients of a calcium supplement made from bone meal prescribed to her from 1962 to 1968. When she employed a toxicologist to test a sample of the product, he determined that it had an extremely high content of lead and concluded that Hayes was most likely suffering from lead poisoning. Hayes won a settlement of $50,000 from the distributor of the calcium supplement, and mounted a campaign to have the FDA ban the import or sale of the food supplement.

An invalid, Hayes moved to San Clemente, California, and her health continued to deteriorate. In 1976, she was diagnosed with leukemia (speculated by her doctor to be caused by the more than 300 X-rays she had endured while seeking treatment for her condition, as well as myelotoxic contamination of the supplement) and was treated regularly in La Jolla, California. While at the hospital receiving a blood transfusion, her condition unexpectedly and rapidly deteriorated as she experienced chills, flu-like symptoms and intense pain. She was transferred to the University of California Medical Center in San Diego, California on February 26, 1977, where she died the following day, at age 46. Hayes was interred with her father at Holy Cross Cemetery in Culver City, California. Her mother Charlotte died eight months later and was buried in a nearby unmarked grave. In a letter that arrived after Hayes's death, the FDA advised her that amendments were being made to the laws governing the importation of nutritional supplements, largely as a result of her situation.

== Filmography ==
=== Film ===
Year	Title	Role	Notes
1954	Francis Joins the WACS	Lt. Dickson	
1954	So This Is Paris	Carmen	Alternative titles: Three Gobs in Paris and So This Is Paree
1954	Sign of the Pagan	Ildico	
1955	The Prodigal	Minor role	Uncredited
1955	The Purple Mask	Irene de Bournotte	
1955	Double Jeopardy	Barbara Devery	Alternative title: Crooked Ring
1955	Chicago Syndicate	Joyce Kern, alias Sue Morton	
1955	Count Three and Pray	Georgina Decrais	Alternative title: The Calico Pony
1956	The Steel Jungle	Mrs. Archer	
1956	Mohawk	Greta Jones	
1956	Gunslinger	Erica Page	
1957	The Undead	Livia	
1957	Zombies of Mora Tau	Mona Harrison	Alternative title: The Dead That Walk
1957	The Unearthly	Grace Thomas	
1957	The Disembodied	Tonda Metz	
1958	Attack of the 50 Foot Woman	Nancy Fowler Archer	as the title character
1958	Wolf Dog	Ellen Hughes	
1958	A Lust to Kill	Sherry	
1958	Hong Kong Confidential	Elena Martine	
1959	Pier 5, Havana	Monica Gray	
1959	Counterplot	Connie Lane	
1960	The Hypnotic Eye	Justine	
1960	The High Powered Rifle	Sharon Hill	Alternative title: Duel in the City
1963	The Crawling Hand	Donna	Alternative title: Don't Cry Wolf
1963	Who's Been Sleeping in My Bed?	Mrs. Grayson	
1965	Tickle Me	Mabel	

=== Television ===
Year	Title	Role	Notes
1955	Four Star Playhouse	Christine	1 episode
1957	The Ford Television Theatre	Marian Abbott	1 episode
1957	Death Valley Days	Mary Granger	1 episode
1957	The Millionaire	Linda Kendall	1 episode
1957	The Web	Blonde	1 episode
1957–1959	Tombstone Territory	Various roles	4 episodes
1958	Cool and Lam	Evaline Dell	Television pilot
1958–1960	Bat Masterson	Ellie Winters	7 episodes
1959	Mike Hammer	Miriam Courtney	1 episode
1959	The Rough Riders	Ellen Johnston	1 episode
1959	Markham	Marina	1 episode
1959	Captain David Grief	Melba	1 episode
1959	World of Giants		1 episode
1959	Rawhide	Rose Morton	1 episode
1959	The Alaskans	Stella	1 episode
1960	Richard Diamond, Private Detective	Angel Case	1 episode
1960	Men into Space	Mandy Holcomb	1 episode
1960	77 Sunset Strip	Marianne Winston	Episode: "The Parallel Caper"
1960	The Untouchables	Mrs. Charles "Pops" Felcher	1 episode
1960–1965	Perry Mason	Various roles	5 episodes
1961	Acapulco	Chloe	Episode: "Bell's Half Acre"
1961	The Case of the Dangerous Robin		1 episode
1961	Dick Powell's Zane Grey Theatre	Millie	1 episode
1961	Laramie	Francie	1 episode
1961	Surfside 6	Lotta	Episode: "Prescription for Panic"
1962	Ripcord	Laura Coulter	1 episode
1962	Bachelor Father	Loretta	1 episode
1962	Kraft Mystery Theatre		1 episode
1963–1964	General Hospital	Priscilla Longsworth	Unknown episodes
1966	The F.B.I.	Anne Frazier	1 episode
1967	The Iron Horse	Dana	1 episode
1967	Gomer Pyle, U.S.M.C.	Rose Pilchek	2 episodes, (final appearance)

Awards and achievements
Preceded by Joann Miller	Miss District of Columbia; 1949	Succeeded by Sandra Stahl
