= Marina Cisternas =

Chilean-American actress, writer, and journalist

- Born: Marta Natalia Filomena Cisternas Holley; May 5, 1897; Iquique, Tarapacá, Chile
- Died: January 26, 1992 (aged 94); Los Angeles, California, U.S.
- Father: Eliseo Cisternas Peña

Marta Natalia Filomena "Marina" Cisternas Holley (5 May 1897 – 26 January 1992) was a Chilean American actress, author, and journalist. She became active as a journalist in Hollywood and in the Hollywood Foreign Press Association (HFPA). She is credited with helping design the Golden Globe trophy. She was the leading Spanish language columnist in Hollywood.

Cisternas was the daughter of Eliseo Cisternas, late Chief Justice of Chile. Her maternal grandfather was Adolfo Holley, a Chilean general who served in the War of the Pacific.

She was president of the HFPA from 1945 to 1946. She was engaged to Harold Lloyd Jr. She influenced Vincent Price's art collecting.

== Bibliography ==
- Andina (1949)
- Forever Damned, Vantage Press (1955), a novel of historical fiction set in Chile
