= Sally Todd =

American actress and model (1934–2022)

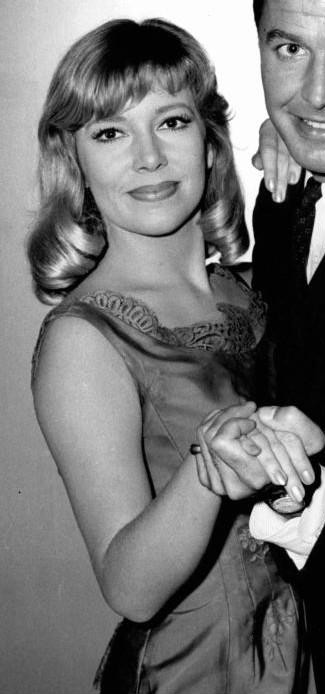
- Sally Todd on The Tab Hunter Show, 1961

Playboy centerfold appearance
- February 1957
- Preceded by: June Blair
- Succeeded by: Sandra Edwards

Personal details
- Born: Sarah Joan Todd; June 7, 1934; Boone, Missouri, U.S.
- Died: November 21, 2022 (aged 88); France

Sally Todd (born Sarah Joan Todd; June 7, 1934 – November 21, 2022) was an American actress and model. She was Playboy magazine's Playmate of the Month for the February 1957 issue. Her centerfold was photographed by David Sutton and Ed DeLong.

== Film and television actress ==
Born in Missouri, and raised in Arizona, Todd's entertainment career began in 1952 when her mother encouraged her to enter The Miss Tucson Beauty Contest at the age of seventeen. She won first prize—an all-expense-paid trip to Hollywood. Upon arrival in Hollywood she took a job modelling teenage clothes, and swimwear for Cole of California. She immediately got an uncredited part as a bathing suit model in the Jane Russell film, The French Line.

In 1955 she moved to New York City to become one of 'The Carson Cuties' on The Johnny Carson Show. The show was short lived and she moved back to Hollywood when it ended in 1956.

Todd was spotted by a talent scout for 20th Century Fox. That led to a contract with the studio and a movie career that consisted mostly of B-movie roles in The Unearthly and Frankenstein's Daughter. Other motion pictures in which she performed are The Revolt of Mamie Stover (1956), The Saga of the Viking Women and Their Voyage to the Waters of the Great Sea Serpent (1957), Al Capone (1959), and G.I. Blues (1960).

Her television appearances include episodes of Dragnet (1958–1959), M Squad (1959), Johnny Ringo (1960), The Many Loves of Dobie Gillis (1960), 77 Sunset Strip (1960), The Untouchables (1959 TV series) (1960), and The Tab Hunter Show (1960)

== Model ==
Todd was among the models who appeared at the 9th Annual Los Angeles Home Show in June 1954. She also posed for several album covers and men's magazines, including Playboy, in which she first appeared in a non-nude pictorial in June 1956.

== Death ==
Sally Todd died in France on November 21, 2022, at the age of 88.

== Bibliography ==
- Todd, Sally (2015). Notorious, Sally Todd: The Life of a Hollywood Icon, an Autobiography. ISBN 9781944241193.

June Blair	Sally Todd	Saundra Edwards	Gloria Windsor	Dawn Richard	Carrie Radison
Jean Jani	Dolores Donlon	Jacquelyn Prescott	Colleen Farrington	Marlene Callahan	Linda Vargas
