= The Unearthly =

1957 science fiction horror film

- Theatrical release poster
- Directed by: Boris Petroff (as Brooke L. Peters)
- Screenplay by: John D.F. Black (as Geoffrey Dennis); Jane Mann
- Story by: Jane Mann
- Produced by: Boris Petroff; Robert A. Terry
- Starring: John Carradine; Myron Healey; Allison Hayes; Marilyn Buferd; Arthur Batanides; Sally Todd; Tor Johnson
- Cinematography: W. Merie Connell
- Edited by: Richard C. Currier
- Music by: Henry Vars
- Production companies: AB-PT Pictures
- Distributed by: Republic Pictures
- Release date: 28 June 1957
- Running time: 73 minutes
- Country: United States
- Language: English

The Unearthly is a 1957 independently made American black-and-white horror film, produced and directed by Boris Petroff (as Brooke L. Peters). It stars John Carradine, Myron Healey, Allison Hayes, Marilyn Buferd, Arthur Batanides, Sally Todd, and Tor Johnson. The film was written by Jane Mann and John D.F. Black. It was released on June 28, 1957 by Republic Pictures Corp. on a double feature with Beginning of the End (1957) .

== Plot ==
At his psychiatric institute, Dr. Charles Conway (John Carradine) is surreptitiously experimenting with artificial glands in an attempt to create longevity; he works with his minion Lobo (Tor Johnson) and his assistant Dr. Sharon Gilchrist (Marilyn Buferd). Conway receives his test subjects through an associate, Dr. Loren Wright (Roy Gordon), who delivers patients seeking treatment for lesser conditions. After this, they are then taken into the operating room for Conway's illicit surgery.

Wright delivers his newest find, Grace Thomas (Allison Hayes), who is seeking treatment for depression. When Conway balks at Wright for bringing him a patient with living relatives, he confides in Conway that he plans to throw Grace's purse and bags into the bay, to fool family and the authorities into believing she had committed suicide. He then asks Conway for a demonstration of his experimental progress; Conway takes him down into the basement, where he introduces him to Harry Jedrow (Harry Fleer), his latest victim. Jedrow is clearly alive, but severely disfigured and in a vegetative state; this concerns Wright, who reveals that Jedrow's sister is currently seeking him out. Conway is furious, since none of his patients were supposed to have ties of any kind.

That night, Lobo (who famously delivers the line "Time for go to bed!") discovers Frank Scott (Myron Healey) roaming the grounds. Scott attempts to conceal his identity, but Conway quickly deduces that he is an escaped convict from his description in the newspapers, as well as a telltale tattoo on his wrist. Rather than turn Scott over to the police, he offers him the chance to take part in his experiments. Knowing the odds are stacked against him, Scott accepts his offer.

Scott is introduced to Grace the following morning, along with the two other patients: Danny Green (Arthur Batanides), who is being treated for anger issues, and pretty young Natalie Andries (Sally Todd), whose treatment regimen for a nervous breakdown is nearing completion. After demanding that Wright make out a certificate of death for Harry Jedrow, Conway happily informs Natalie that one last treatment for her is all that's necessary. While the other patients sleep, Natalie is sedated, taken to the operating room, and given an artificial gland along with a high dosage of electricity. The procedure backfires, and she ends up a senile old woman. They hide her in a back room.

Lobo is ordered to bury Jedrow alive, but Frank Scott sneaks out to the burial site and opens the coffin. Jedrow rises out of it and escapes, and Lobo—not having been alerted—buries the casket. Sharon confronts Conway about his apparent affinity for Grace, and requests that she be made the next patient to be experimented upon. Meanwhile, Scott begins attempting to reveal Dr. Conway's unethical deeds to the other patients. After a failed attempt to reveal Natalie's fate, he manages to show Grace and Danny what had happened to her, only to be caught by Dr. Conway and Sharon. They detain Scott and Danny, and prepare Grace for surgery.

Danny helps Scott escape by distracting Lobo, who fatally shoots him before being knocked unconscious by Scott. Scott confronts Dr. Conway with Lobo's gun and reveals that he is not a convicted murderer; he is actually Lt. Mark Houston, an undercover police officer sent to investigate the psychiatrist's practice. Dr. Conway evades arrest, but is murdered by Jedrow. Lobo kills Jedrow, but Houston's police backup arrives soon afterward, arresting Lobo and Sharon, and barely saving Grace from the procedure. The police go downstairs and find Danny's body, and then discover a menagerie of horrors, all failed subjects of Conway's longevity experiments. The police captain wonders, "Good Lord, what if they do live forever?"

== Cast ==
- John Carradine as Dr. Charles Conway
- Myron Healey as Mark Houston / Frank Scott (credited as Myron Healy)
- Allison Hayes as Grace Thomas
- Marilyn Buferd as Dr. Sharon Gilchrist (credited as Marylyn Buferd)
- Arthur Batanides as Danny Green
- Sally Todd as Natalie Andries
- Tor Johnson as Lobo
- Harry Fleer as Harry Jedrow
- Roy Gordon as Dr. Loren Wright
- Guy Prescott as Police Captain George Reagan
- Raymond Guth as Police Officer Miller (credited as Raymond Guta)
- Paul McWilliams as Police Officer Ed

== Production ==
Along with Anatomy of a Psycho (1961), The Unearthly was one of two films produced and directed by Boris Petroff as "Brooke L. Peters". Originally called The House of Monsters, it was filmed over approximately five days. The film was acquired by AB-PT Pictures after principal photography had been completed. While the film credits Jane Mann with the original story, her co-screenwriter John D. F. Black (credited as Geoffrey Dennis) reports that she merely typed the script. Tor Johnson appears as Dr. Conway's minion "Lobo", a role similar to his character of the same name in Ed Wood's Bride of the Monster (1955). (Johnson also played Lobo in Night of the Ghouls, a pseudo-sequel to Bride.)

The production designer was Charles D. Hall, credited in the film as "Daniel Hall"; this was his second to last feature. Hall was the acclaimed art director of Dracula (1931), Frankenstein (1931), Murders in the Rue Morgue (1932), The Invisible Man (1933), The Black Cat (1934), Bride of Frankenstein (1935), and One Million B.C. (1940). In many of his later productions, Hall used found objects (items not specially made for the film) and locations that were both simple and economical. In The Unearthly, he used found props in addition to simple designs for the operating room and the creature holding cell, where the monsters toil at a turret—reminiscent of Island of Lost Souls (1932)—which was intended as a brief tribute to the greats of the horror genre. Character actor Richard Reeves appears uncredited in the film as one of the toiling creatures.

The film's score was written by Henry Vars.

== Release ==
=== Theatrical ===
Released in the United States on 28 June 1957, The Unearthly was distributed theatrically by Republic Pictures Corp. on a double feature with Beginning of the End (1957). It continued to be shown in theaters until at least 1962.

=== Home media ===
The film aired on television as early as 25 March 1962, and eventually received multiple releases on VHS. It was released on DVD on 6 August 2002 by Image Entertainment. The DVD of the Mystery Science Theater 3000 episode featuring The Unearthly (originally aired 14 December 1991) was released by Shout Factory on 16 November 2011.

== Reception ==
The film was reviewed negatively in the film trade journal Harrison's Reports, being described as "mediocre", "produced on a shoe-string budget", and "a feeble and trite effort, full of obvious theatrics and hammy melodramatic acting".

Film critic Leonard Maltin later gave the film one and a half out of four stars, commenting "Mad scientist Carradine's experiments in immortality have resulted only in a basement full of deformed morons. Don't you join them."

== See also ==
- List of American films of 1957
