= Wolf Dog =

1958 Northwestern movie

- Film poster
- Directed by: Sam Newfield
- Written by: Louis Stevens
- Produced by: Sam Newfield
- Starring: Jim Davis; Allison Hayes
- Cinematography: Frederick Ford
- Edited by: Douglas Robertson
- Music by: John Bath
- Production company: Regal Films Inc
- Distributed by: 20th Century-Fox
- Release date: July 1958 (United States)
- Running time: 69 minutes
- Countries: United States; Canada
- Language: English

Wolf Dog, also known as A Boy and His Dog, is a 1958 Western film directed and produced by Sam Newfield and Regal Films. The film stars Jim Davis and Allison Hayes.

== Cast ==
- Jim Davis

== Production ==
In August 1957, Newfield and a camera crew filmed the movie in and around Markdale, Ontario, near Owen Sound, Ontario, Canada.

The movie co-starred Hollywood actors Jim Davis, Allison Hayes, John Hart, and Canadian actors Austin Willis, Don Garrard and Tony Brown. Several locals were offered a chance to be unpaid "extras." Among those were Paul Hutton, Jerry Bartley, Constable Clarence Bowins, David Jackson, Officer Jack Johnston, Ron Wyvill, and Don Wyvill.

== Reception ==
While not an artistic or commercial success, the film is noteworthy in that it was created almost 40 years before Telefilm Canada and federal government subsidies enabled big-name movies to be filmed in Canadian locales. It was shot in Canada and was filmed in Alberta and Ontario. Markdale residents were delighted to have Hollywood make a film in their town.

It was hoped a film set in "The Great North Country" would be a crossover hit in the U.S. and the Commonwealth, both lucrative movie markets. For reasons unknown, the film disappeared from the public eye for almost 50 years. An unsubstantiated rumor suggested one of the main actors wanted all traces of the film destroyed. The only known copies of the film are an incomplete version stored at the National Archives of Canada and a complete version at the U.S. Library of Congress.

Copies of the movie can be found at the Markdale Public Library, Ontario, Canada, donated by the creator of the fan site, Jeff Wilson. He, along with actors from the film, Ron Wyvill and Paul Hutton, appeared in a short documentary made by Rogers Television, Owen Sound. Wilson and Wyvill also organized several screenings in the town of Markdale, Ontario, where the film was originally shot. There is also a link to a radio interview with Ron Wyvill on YouTube, which can be found on the channel Toonguy85, which belongs to Wilson.

All distribution copyrights belong to 20th Century Fox.
