= Pier 5, Havana =

1959 film by Edward L. Cahn

- Theatrical release poster
- Directed by: Edward L. Cahn
- Written by: Joseph Hoffman; Robert E. Kent
- Produced by: Robert E. Kent; Edward Small (executive)
- Starring: Cameron Mitchell; Allison Hayes
- Cinematography: Maury Gertsman
- Edited by: Grant Whytock
- Music by: Paul Sawtell; Bert Shefter
- Production company: Robert E. Kent Productions
- Distributed by: United Artists
- Release date: October 1959
- Running time: 68 minutes
- Country: United States
- Language: English

Pier 5, Havana is a 1959 American Neo-noir, action, adventure, mystery, thriller crime film directed by Edward L. Cahn starring Cameron Mitchell and Allison Hayes.

== Plot ==
Steve Daggett (Cameron Mitchell) fights to protect Fidel Castro from dangerous pro-Batista counterrevolutionaries. Steve comes to Cuba to find his friend Hank Miller (Logan Field) who has been missing for a while. It turns out that he has been captured by Fernando (Eduardo Noriega), the leader of the pro-Batista forces, who needs Hank to convert their airplanes into bombers. Steve's former girlfriend Monica (Allison Hayes) is now Mrs. Hank Miller.

Pier 5, Havana was filmed in the Los Angeles area just after the Cuban Revolution. The Errol Flynn semi-documentary Cuban Rebel Girls and the black comedy Our Man in Havana were shot on location on the island in the same post-revolution period.

== Cast ==
- Cameron Mitchell as Steve Daggett
- Allison Hayes as Monica Gray
- Eduardo Noriega as Fernando Ricardo
- Michael Granger as Police Lt. Garcia
- Logan Field as Hank Miller
- Nestor Paiva as Juan Lopez
- Otto Waldis as Gustave Schluss
- Paul Fierro as Police sergeant
