= Harold Lloyd Jr. =

American film actor (1931–1971)

- Harold Lloyd Jr. in The Flaming Urge
- Born: Harold Clayton Lloyd Jr. January 25, 1931; Beverly Hills, California, U.S.
- Died: June 9, 1971 (aged 40); Los Angeles, California, U.S.
- Occupations: Actor, singer
- Years active: 1950–1965
- Parent(s): Harold Lloyd; Mildred Davis

Harold Clayton Lloyd Jr. (January 25, 1931 – June 9, 1971) was an American actor and singer.

== Career ==
The third child and only son of the silent film comedian Harold Lloyd and former actress Mildred Davis, Lloyd made several B-movies in the 1950s and 1960s, including The Flaming Urge (1953) (one of only two starring roles) and Frankenstein's Daughter (1958). In 1959, he had a role in the film Girls Town, which features Charles Chaplin Jr., son of famous silent movie comedian Charlie Chaplin. He was given production roles in the compilations of his father's films, released in the early 1960s. As a singer, he performed in several films, had moderate successes in cabaret in Hollywood and elsewhere, and released an album of romantic ballads in 1965 titled Intimate Style.

== Personal life ==
Lloyd (known as Dukey to his family) found it difficult to live in the shadow of his famous father, and was an alcoholic from his twenties onward. In addition, he struggled with his homosexuality at a time when it was considered socially unacceptable. Author Tom Dardis notes that Lloyd Sr. was understanding of his son's sexuality and protective of his son, given Lloyd Jr.'s tendency toward violent lovers. Consequently, the younger Lloyd often returned to Greenacres, the family estate, battered and bruised after his encounters. His father's tolerance had its limits, however, and Lloyd Sr. blamed his own absences during his son's childhood for his sexuality.

In 1953, he was briefly engaged to the Chilean actress Marina Cisternas. In 1960, he was again engaged, this time to Parisian socialite Irene Barrelet de Ricou, daughter of French tennis player Paul Barrelet de Ricou and socialite Louise Barrelet de Ricou. Irene was warned by many, including Bing Crosby, not to marry Lloyd, but it was not until she caught him with another man that the wedding was canceled.

He had a home in Palm Springs, California.

== Death ==
Lloyd suffered a massive stroke in 1965 from which he never fully recovered. He died on June 9, 1971, at age 40, three months after the death of his father. He was interred with his parents in a crypt in the Great Mausoleum's Begonia Corridor at Glendale Forest Lawn Cemetery.

== Filmography ==
Year	Film	Role	Notes
1950	Our Very Own	Student	Uncredited
1953	The Flaming Urge	Tom Smith	
1955	A Yank in Ermine	Butch	
1958	Father Knows Best	Joel	Credited television appearance
1958	Frankenstein's Daughter	Don	
1959	Girls Town	Chip Gardner	
1960	Platinum High School	Charlie-Boy Cable	
1960	Sex Kittens Go to College	Policeman	
1962	Married Too Young	Tommy Blaine	
1965	Mutiny in Outer Space	Sgt. Andrews	(final film role)
