= Page Cavanaugh =

American pianist, vocalist, and arranger (1922–2008)

Walter Page Cavanaugh (January 26, 1922 in Cherokee, Kansas – December 19, 2008 in Los Angeles) was an American jazz and pop pianist, vocalist, and arranger.

== Career ==
He began on piano at age nine and played with Ernie Williamson's band in 1938–39 before moving to Los Angeles and joining the Bobby Sherwood band at age 20.

While serving in the military during World War II, he met guitarist Al Viola and bassist Lloyd Pratt, with whom he formed a trio. After the war's end they performed together as a trio using the same instrumentation that the Nat King Cole Trio had pioneered in the early 40's (piano, guitar and bass with no drummer), scoring a number of hits in the late 1940s, including "The Three Bears", "Walkin' My Baby Back Home", and "All of Me". The trio appeared in the films A Song Is Born, Big City, Lullaby of Broadway (with Doris Day) and Romance on the High Seas (Doris Day's first film, in 1948). He recorded dozens of tracks with Doris Day, Frank Sinatra, Dinah Shore, June Christy, Mel Torme and other legendary singers.

In the early 1950s, Cavanaugh had a program, Page Pages You, on the short-lived Progressive Broadcasting System. Additionally, the trio played on Frank Sinatra's radio program, Songs by Sinatra, and on The Jack Paar Show.

Cavanaugh played in Los Angeles nightclubs through the 1990s, both in a trio setting (with Viola for many years) and as a septet, the Page 7. He recorded with Bobby Woods & Les Deux Love Orchestra. He recorded for MGM, Capitol, RCA, Tops, Star Line, Tiara, and Dobre Records over the course of his career, releasing his final trio album, Return to Elegance, in 2006.

Cavanaugh died on December 19, 2008, of kidney failure.

== Discography ==
- Page Cavanaugh Carries the Torch (ERA, 1956)
- The Girl (Vaya, 1956)
- Page Cavanaugh Plays for the Cocktail Hour (Tops, 1957)
- Fats Sent Me (Capitol, 1957)
- Music for the Cocktail Hour (Craftsmen, 1958)
- Softly (Time, 1964)
- Is Alive (Dobre, 1978)
- Return to Elegance (Moon over Leg, 2006)

== Filmography ==
- Romance on the High Seas (1948) with Doris Day
- Frankenstein's Daughter (1958)
- Jingle, Jangle, Jingle (1948) 20 min short film
- Big City (1948)

== Death ==
Page Cavanaugh died at the age of 86. He died on friday morning after a protracted kidney fairlure at a skilled nursing facility in Granada Hills,
