= Romance on the High Seas =

1948 film by Michael Curtiz

- Theatrical release poster.
- Directed by: Michael Curtiz
- Screenplay by: Julius J. Epstein; Philip G. Epstein; I. A. L. Diamond (additional dialogue)
- Story by: S. Pondal Rios; Carlos A. Olivari
- Produced by: Alex Gottlieb
- Starring: Jack Carson; Janis Paige; Don DeFore; Doris Day
- Cinematography: Elwood Bredell
- Edited by: Rudi Fehr
- Music by: Jule Styne; Lyrics by Sammy Cahn; Musical numbers orchestrated and conducted by Ray Heindorf
- Color process: Technicolor
- Production company: Michael Curtiz Productions
- Distributed by: Warner Bros. Pictures
- Release dates: June 26, 1948 (New York City); July 3, 1948 (U.S.)
- Running time: 99 minutes
- Country: United States
- Language: English
- Budget: $2 million or $2,532,000
- Box office: $2.1 million (US rentals) or $3,225,000

Romance on the High Seas (released in the United Kingdom as It's Magic) is a 1948 American musical romantic comedy film directed by Michael Curtiz, starring Jack Carson, Janis Paige, Don DeFore and Doris Day in her film debut. Busby Berkeley was the choreographer. The film was nominated for two Academy Awards, for Original Song for "It's Magic" (music by Jule Styne, lyrics by Sammy Cahn), and Music, Scoring of a Musical Picture (Ray Heindorf).

== Plot ==
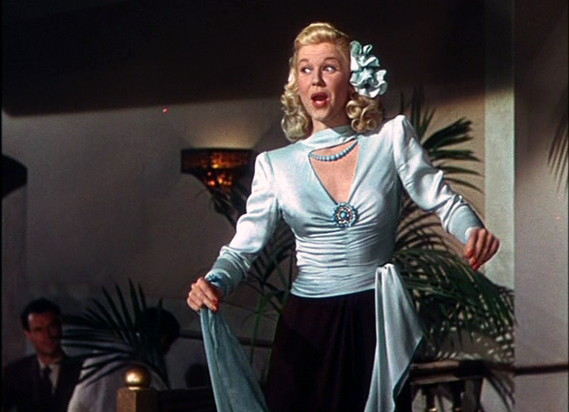
Doris Day as Georgia Garrett, singing "I'm in Love".

Elvira Kent (Janis Paige) and her husband Michael (Don DeFore) suspect each other of cheating. For their wedding anniversary, Elvira books an ocean cruise to Rio de Janeiro but her husband claims that unexpected business will prevent him from going. Seeing an opportunity, Elvira pretends to take the trip alone, but in fact sends singer Georgia Garrett (Doris Day), a woman she'd met at the travel agency, in her place and under her name. By secretly staying behind, Elvira hopes to find out if Michael is indeed sneaking around behind her back. Michael, however, is suspicious over Elvira's supposed willingness to go on the trip alone, and so hires private detective Peter Virgil (Jack Carson) to see if she is sneaking around behind his back.

Peter joins the cruise and, as part of his job, becomes acquainted with Georgia. Georgia, following the instructions of the real Elvira, keeps up the ruse by pretending to be Elvira to everyone, including Peter. Georgia and Peter are attracted to each other and gradually fall in love, which causes conflict for both of them.

During one of the cruise stops, Georgia's friend, Oscar Farrar (Oscar Levant), comes on board. Oscar is in love with Georgia despite Georgia's lack of interest in him, and when Peter spots them together, he thinks he has discovered the identity of Elvira's lover.

The film's third act is set in a hotel in the Rio de Janeiro where all the principal characters converge and ride a merry-go-round of mistaken identities. Peter finds out that he's actually fallen in love with Miss Garrett instead of the real Mrs. Kent. Sorting out their true identities, as well as resolving the crossed love plots, concludes the picture.

== Cast ==
- Jack Carson as Peter Virgil
- Janis Paige as Elvira Kent
- Don DeFore as Michael Kent
- Doris Day as Georgia Garrett
- Oscar Levant as Oscar Farrar
- S. Z. Sakall as Uncle Lazlo
- Fortunio Bonanova as Plinio
- Eric Blore as Ship's Doctor
- Franklin Pangborn as Rio Hotel Clerk
- Leslie Brooks as Miss Medwick
- William Bakewell as Travel Agent
- John Berkes as The Drunk (as Johnny Berkes)
- Specialty Players
  The Samba Kings
  Avon Long
  The Page Cavanaugh Trio
  Sir Lancelot

Unbilled (in order of appearance)

- John Alvin as Travel agent
- Wheaton Chambers as Photographer
- Douglas Kennedy as Car salesman
- Tris Coffin as Headwaiter on the ship
- Sandra Gould as Phone operator
- Grady Sutton as Radio operator
- Maila Nurmi as Passenger
- Barbara Bates as Stewardess

== Music ==
- "Put 'em in a Box, Tie 'em with a Ribbon, and Throw 'em in the Deep Blue Sea" – Doris Day and the Page Cavanaugh Trio
- "It's Magic" – Doris Day
- "It's You or No One" – Doris Day
- "I'm in Love" – Doris Day
- "The Tourist Trade" – Avon Long
- "Run, Run, Run" – Jack Carson
- "She's a Latin from Manhattan" – Doris Day
- "Romance on the High Seas" – The Samba Kings
- "Brazilian Rhapsody" (aka Cuban Rhapsody) – Oscar Levant

== Production ==
Originally conceived as a star vehicle for Betty Hutton, the film had to be recast when Hutton became pregnant, and thus unavailable. Other established stars like Judy Garland and Jane Powell were briefly considered, before Michael Curtiz was persuaded to audition Doris Day, then known as a band vocalist, but hitherto not considered an actress. Her personal life was in some turmoil at the time, as her second marriage, to musician George Weidler, was ending, and this, combined with her evident nervousness, led her to deliver a notably teary, emotive version of "Embraceable You" at the audition. Impressed by her singing ability and fresh-faced good looks, Curtiz signed her to a film contract and cast her in the leading role of Georgia Garrett. Despite the change in star and the late casting of Janis Paige, the film was financially successful.

Before meeting Hutton's replacement, director Curtiz's requirements were that she had to be beautiful, that she had to be able to sing and dance, and that, above all, she must have "sparkle." After dozens of young women failed to match Curtiz's specifications, Doris Day was finally introduced to him. He immediately perked up and exclaimed, "This is it. This is the most everything dame I have ever seen." Doris Day got an exclusive contract with Michael Curtiz Productions paying her $500 per week (about $6,909.13 in 2026).

Legendary screenwriter I. A. L. Diamond, who is credited as having written "additional dialogue" for this film, was still trying to establish a reputation for himself in 1948. Earlier, at Universal-International, he had received his initial writing credit on a low-budget mystery before moving to Warner Bros. Pictures, where he wrote Two Guys from Milwaukee (1946), a comedy that featured Jack Carson, one of the four main performers in Romance. It would be almost a decade before Diamond's career finally clicked—when he was introduced to director Billy Wilder. That meeting began a successful movie partnership that lasted many years.

== Reception ==
=== Box office ===
According to Warner Bros records the film earned $2,200,000 domestically and $1,025,000 foreign.

=== Criticisms and appraisals ===
Doris Day's motion picture premiere did not impress Bosley Crowther of the New York Times, who wrote that Day "has no more than a vigorous disposition which hits the screen like a thud." As for the movie itself, Crowther found it "a scatterbrained comedy of errors."

An anonymous review in small-town Texas newspaper The Kaufman Herald, published in late 1948, asserted that "seldom does a film musical come along which gives all of its stars a chance to shine so much ... Miss Day impresses for her ease and command before the cameras. Her song delivery is neat, and she is able to wear costumes smartly." Another rural Texas publication, The Hearne Democrat, called it "a rib-tickling musical that is full of laughs all the way."

In his laudatory review of a live singing performance by Doris Day at the Gregory Gym in Austin, Texas in the winter of 1949, entertainment critic Steve Perkins of the Austin American-Statesman reminded his readers of the rave review of Romance he had written the previous summer through the following excerpt: "A new leading lady has popped up out of nowhere and it will probably be a long time before she pops down again. Doris Day, who had already achieved a small measure of fame with dance bands and on records, is a vocalist who can act, sing sweet and look pretty all at the same time."

In later years, Village Voice critic, Molly Haskell, asserted that "whenever I remember [Doris Day's] roles...it is as one of the few movie heroines who had to work for a living." In Romance on the High Seas, Day's first film character, Georgia Garrett, is indeed a poor, working-class chanteuse whose favorite pastime is dreaming of ocean voyages she thinks she'll never enjoy.

Writing for Film Comment magazine in 2007, Hazel-Dawn Dumpert called Day's work in this film "a doughy debut as a gum-smacking honky-tonk singer" and claims her real "movie persona [did not] click into place" until the early 1950s in films such as On Moonlight Bay. She also described Romance on the High Seas as a "pastel pleasure cruise."

== In popular culture ==
A brief clip of the movie appears in the 1951 Bugs Bunny cartoon Rabbit Every Monday, directed by Friz Freleng.

=== Accolades ===
The film was nominated for the following American Film Institute lists:

- 2002: AFI's 100 Years...100 Passions
- 2004: AFI's 100 Years...100 Songs: "It's Magic"
- 2006: AFI's Greatest Movie Musicals
