= Mohawk (1956 film) =

1956 film by Kurt Neumann

- Directed by: Kurt Neumann
- Written by: Maurice Geraghty; Milton Krims
- Produced by: Edward L. Alperson
- Starring: Scott Brady; Rita Gam; Neville Brand
- Cinematography: Karl Struss
- Edited by: William B. Murphy
- Music by: Edward L. Alperson
- Production company: Edward L. Alperson Productions
- Distributed by: 20th Century-Fox
- Release date: April 1, 1956
- Running time: 80 minutes
- Country: United States
- Language: English

Mohawk is a 1956 American adventure western romance film directed by Kurt Neumann, starring Scott Brady, Rita Gam and Neville Brand. The picture is about an 18th-century Boston artist sent to the Mohawk Valley to paint landscapes and portraits of Native Americans.

Several sections of footage are taken from the 1939 film Drums Along the Mohawk and loosely refers to the 1778 Cherry Valley massacre (as does the main antagonist Butler to the historic figure of loyalist officer Walter Butler).

== Plot ==
In late 18th-century upstate New York, Cynthia Stanhope, a society lady from Boston, accompanied by her Aunt Agatha, travels to Fort Alden to surprise her fiancé, artist Jonathon Adams. When they arrive, Adams is away from the fort painting local barmaid Greta Jones, with whom he has a more than professional relationship.

Descendant of the first white family in the Mohawk Valley, Butler despises all the white settlers in "his" valley, and also the local Indians. He goes to the Iroquois chef Kowanen to warn him about a party of armed white settlers. Kowanen shows no concern, but his teenaged son Keoga and brave Rokhawah feel otherwise and plot a raid to steal the settlers' muskets. With the help of Keoga's sister Onida, they enter the fort by a tunnel built by the garrison, but as they are leaving with the muskets they are discovered and several are killed. Onida is trapped in the fort and is later discovered by Adams hiding in his quarters. He helps her escape in his wagon the next morning, and while escorting her back to her people develops a romantic interest in her.

At the village, unarmed Adams defeats knife-wielding Rokhawah in a fight, earning the respect and trust of Kowanen and admiration from Keoga. Adams offers to paint the chief's portrait to show the whites how the Indians live. When Adams fails to arrive back inside the fort by sunset, as required of all the settlers, Butler urges Captain Langley to attack the fort, but Langley refuses. Later, after more agitation by Butler, Langley goes to the village and explains to Adams and Kowanen about Butler's incitement. Kowanen, seeking peace with the white settlers, offers to have his son Keoga accompany Langley and Adams back to the fort, as a sign of good faith.

Langley returns to the fort with Adams and Keoga following later in the wagon. En route they are ambushed by Butler who shoots and kills Keoga. Adams does not see the attacker. He takes Keoga's body back to his tribe, and Kowanen contemplates war. Adams discovers from Onida that it was Butler's idea for the Indians to steal the guns from the fort. He asks Kowanen to let him prove who shot Keoga, but Kowanen has already agreed to go to a war. At Rokhawah's suggestion they intend to burn Adams at the stake, but Onida helps him escape, killing Rokhawah in the process.

Adams reaches the fort, with the Indians not far behind. As the settlers retreat to the fort the Indians burn their homes and crops. While a trooper is sent for reinforcements, Butler tries to leave the fort as well. Adams confronts Butler and Butler's knowledge of the murder reveals his guilt. As the Indians attack, Butler is cast out of the besieged fort and while he pleads to be allowed back in, he is killed by an arrow in his back. After being repulsed several times the Indians finally break into the fort but just in time the reinforcements arrive.

Adams convinces Kowanen that Butler was responsible for inciting the war, and a truce is declared. Cynthia goes back to Boston with the paintings but Adams remains behind to be with Onida.

== Cast ==
- Scott Brady as Jonathan Adams
- Rita Gam as Onida
- Neville Brand as Rokhawah
- Lori Nelson as Cynthia Stanhope
- Allison Hayes as Greta Jones
- John Hoyt as Butler
- Rhys Williams as Clem Jones
- Barbara Jo Allen as Aunt Agatha (as Vera Vague)
- Mae Clarke as Minikah
- Tommy Cook as Keoga
- Ted de Corsia as Indian Chief Kowanen
- Michael Granger as Priest
- John Hudson as Captain Langley

== See also ==
- List of American films of 1956
