= Fangs of the Wild (1954 film) =

1954 film directed by William F. Claxton

- Directed by: William F. Claxton
- Screenplay by: Orville H. Hampton
- Based on: William F. Claxton
- Produced by: Robert L. Lippert, Jr.
- Starring: Onslow Stevens; Margia Dean; Freddy Ridgeway; Phil Tead; Robert Stevenson; Charles Chaplin Jr.
- Cinematography: Paul Ivano
- Edited by: Monica Collingwood
- Music by: Paul Dunlap
- Production company: Lippert Pictures
- Distributed by: Lippert Pictures
- Release date: April 2, 1954 (United States)
- Running time: 72 minutes
- Country: United States
- Language: English

Fangs of the Wild is a 1954 American adventure western film directed by William F. Claxton starring Onslow Stevens, Margia Dean, Freddy Ridgeway, Phil Tead, Robert Stevenson and Charles Chaplin Jr. It was produced and distributed as a second feature by Lippert Pictures.

== Plot ==
A boy sees a murder at his father's (Onslow Stevens) lodge, but the killer (Charles Chaplin Jr.) calls it a hunting accident.

== Cast ==
- Onslow Stevens as Jim Summers
- Margia Dean as Linda Wharton
- Freddy Ridgeway as Tad Summers
- Phil Tead as Mac
- Robert Stevenson as Deputy Sheriff Ridgeway
- Charles Chaplin Jr. as Roger Wharton
- Buck as Shep

== Bibliography ==
- Pitts, Michael R. Western Movies: A Guide to 5,105 Feature Films. McFarland, 2012.
