= The Flaming Urge =

1953 film

- Directed by: Harold Ericson
- Written by: Harold Ericson (screenplay); Harold Ericson (story); Ray Pierson (story)
- Produced by: Richard L'Estrange (associate producer); A.W. Hackel; Ray Pierson (producer)
- Starring: Harold Lloyd Jr. Cathy Downs
- Cinematography: Clark Ramsey
- Edited by: Maurice Kline
- Music by: Raoul Kraushaar
- Distributed by: A. W. Hackel Productions
- Release date: 1953
- Running time: 68 minutes
- Country: United States
- Language: English

The Flaming Urge is a 1953 American crime film directed by Harold Ericson.

== Plot ==
Upon arriving in the small town of Monroe, Michigan, a young man secures a job at a department store. Despite this, he is inexplicably drawn to observe fires, which leads to suspicion when a series of arson attacks plague the town, making him the prime suspect.

== Cast ==
- Harold Lloyd Jr. as Tom Smith
- Cathy Downs as Charlotte Cruickshank
- Byron Foulger as A. Horace Pender
- Jonathan Hale as Mr. Chalmers
- Bob Hughes as Frank
- Florence Lake as Mrs. Binger
- Herbert Rawlinson as Herb, fire chief
- Pierre Watkin as Albert Cruickshank
- Barbara Woodell as Mrs. Cruickshank
- Johnny Duncan as Ralph Jarvis
