= List of The Dick Van Dyke Show episodes =

The Dick Van Dyke Show is an American television sitcom. The series ran for five seasons on CBS, lasting 158 half-hour episodes, all filmed in black-and-white. Creator/writer Carl Reiner had told the cast from the beginning that if the show made it through five seasons, that would be its maximum run.

== Series overview ==
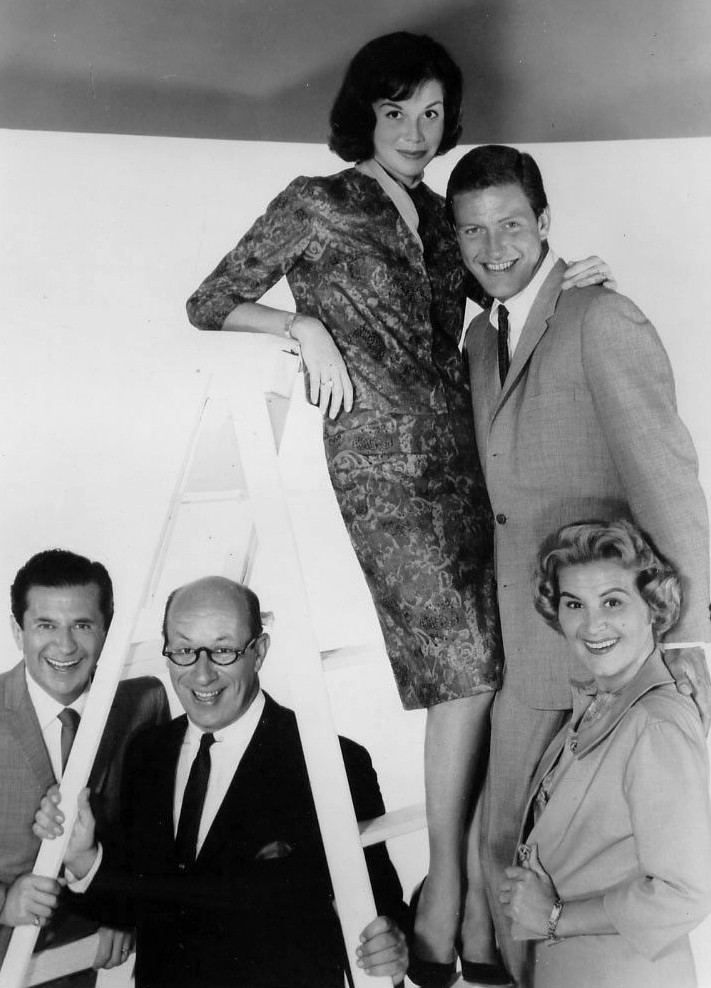
Cast of the series

All five seasons have been released on DVD by Image Entertainment.

Season	Episodes	Originally released		Rank	Rating
Season	Episodes	First released	Last released	Rank	Rating
Pilot		July 19, 1960		—N/a	—N/a
1	30	October 3, 1961	April 18, 1962	80	16.1
2	32	September 26, 1962	May 8, 1963	9	27.1
3	32	September 25, 1963	May 13, 1964	3	33.3
4	32	September 23, 1964	May 26, 1965	7	27.1
5	32	September 15, 1965	June 1, 1966	16	23.6

== Cast ==
- Dick Van Dyke as Robert "Rob" Simpson Petrie
- Rose Marie as Sally Rogers
- Morey Amsterdam as Maurice "Buddy" Sorrell
- Larry Mathews as Richard "Ritchie" Rosebud Petrie
- Mary Tyler Moore as Laura Petrie

== Recurring ==
- Richard Deacon as Melvin "Mel" Cooley
- Ann Morgan Guilbert as Mildred "Millie" Helper
- Jerry Paris as Dr. Gerald "Jerry" Helper
- Carl Reiner as Alan Brady (seasons 4–5)

== Episodes ==
=== Pilot (1960) ===
Title	Directed by	Written by	Original release date
"Head of the Family"	Don Weis	Carl Reiner	July 19, 1960
Laura Petrie (Barbara Britton) is preparing dinner. Rob Petrie (Carl Reiner) was commissioned by his son Ritchie's (Gary Morgan) school to write a comedic bulletin for the PTA. Mrs. Harley (Jean Sincere) comes by to pick it up. Laura tells her that Rob hasn't finished it yet, but will today at the office. Laura finds Ritchie hiding in a closet. Ritchie is embarrassed about his father's occupation. Laura tells him that being a TV writer for the Alan Sturdy Show is a real job. Rob comes home and Ritchie runs away from him. Laura suggests that Rob take Ritchie to his office, so he can see what Rob does. The next day, Rob's co-writers Buddy Sorrell (Morty Gunty) and Sally Rogers (Sylvia Miles) are at the office. Rob arrives with Ritchie and tells him that he is the head writer. Coffee Man Snappy (Milt Kamen) comes by and makes fun of the show they wrote a couple weeks ago. Rob tries to get him out of the office. Rob is called to Allan's office and takes Ritchie with him. Allan tells Rob the opening he wrote is no good and not funny. Ritchie hears all of this. Back at home, Rob tells Laura that things didn't go well with Ritchie at the office. At school, all the kids really like the comedic bulletin that Rob wrote. They ask Ritchie if his dad is always so smart and funny. Ritchie starts to feel proud of his father. Note: This unaired pilot is for a show titled Head of the Family starring Carl Reiner as Rob Petrie. It had an entirely different cast playing the same characters as those who would ultimately appear in The Dick Van Dyke Show. For more information see Head of the Family pilot

=== Season 1 (1961–1962) ===
- Season 1 of The Dick Van Dyke Show consisted of 30 black-and-white half-hour episodes airing on CBS.

No. overall	No. in season	Title	Directed by	Written by	Original release date	Prod. code
1	1	"The Sick Boy and the Sitter"	Sheldon Leonard	Carl Reiner	October 3, 1961	1
Rob Petrie (Dick Van Dyke), Sally Rogers (Rose Marie), Buddy Sorell (Morey Amsterdam), and Mel Cooley (Richard Deacon) are part of the staff of The Alan Brady Show. In the Season 1 premiere, Rob talks his wife Laura (Mary Tyler Moore) into leaving their sick son Ritchie (Larry Mathews) with a babysitter while they attend a party at the home of TV star Alan Brady (unseen and unheard in this episode, later played by Carl Reiner). While at the party Rob, Buddy and Sally are asked to entertain. When Rob and Laura come home they find Dr. Miller (Stacy Keach Sr.) there. It turns out Janie (Mary Lee Dearring), the babysitter, hit her head on the freezer door, but Ritchie is perfectly fine. Eleanor Audley as Party Goer. Fred Sherman as Party Goer. George DeNormand as Party Goer. Songs: Dick, Rose & Morey sing "Goodbye, Goodbye". Rose sings "I Wish I Could Sing Like Durante".
2	2	"My Blonde-Haired Brunette"	John Rich	Carl Reiner	October 10, 1961	9
Laura is concerned when Rob would rather sleep in on his day off than have breakfast with her. She wonders if Rob is losing interest in her. When he finally gets up, he dresses like a slob. Rob teases Laura when he finds a gray hair on her head. Rob can tell she's upset, but he does not know why. The next day, neighbor Millie Helper (Ann Morgan Guilbert) asks Laura what's wrong. Millie suggests that Laura bleach her hair blonde to get Rob's attention. At the office, Sally tells Rob that maybe he's not telling Laura often enough that he loves her. Laura does dye her hair and immediately regrets it. After Rob calls her, she learns how much he likes her dark hair. Millie calls the Druggist (Benny Rubin) and wants him to drop off some dye. Rob comes home and Laura only has half her hair dyed back. She explains why she did it and Rob understands.
3	3	"Sally and the Lab Technician"	John Rich	Carl Reiner	October 17, 1961	4
Laura wonders why Sally isn't married. Rob says that Sally always frightens guys away because she's so out going. Laura thinks Sally would be a good match with her cousin Thomas Edson (Eddie Firestone), the lab technician. Rob is against Laura's matchmaking because Sally and Thomas are complete opposites. Laura wants to have the two over for dinner. When Rob asks her, Sally agrees to meet Thomas. That night a very timid Thomas arrives first. Sally shows up and starts right off with the jokes. Rob and Laura think the dinner was a disaster. The next day, Sally feels really bad because she thinks she over did it. That night Rob tells Laura about how Sally felt. Just then Thomas comes to the door. It turns out Thomas had a great time with Sally. Thomas would like to see her again. Jamie Farr as coffee deliveryman.
4	4	"Washington vs. the Bunny"	John Rich	Carl Reiner	October 24, 1961	5
Rob is on a flight back from Washington. He's sitting next to Bill (Jesse White), who sells ladies underwear. Rob tells Bill about how he had to choose between going to Washington as a talent scout for The Alan Brady Show and staying home to see Ritchie in the school play as "the main bunny." Flashback to Rob in the office with Buddy and Sally. Mel tells Rob about the trip to scout an up and coming female singer. Rob mentions Ritchie's play, but reluctantly agrees to go. At home, Rob tells Laura about the trip. She makes Rob feel guilty. He calls Alan and says he can't make the trip as Ritchie may have a broken arm. That night, torn between his obligation to Alan and his job and seeing Ritchie's play, Rob has a bad dream. After Laura orders him to not go on the trip, Rob feels like her puppet. Rob wakes up and decides to make the trip. Back to the present on the plane. Rob tells Bill that the trip ended up being useless as the singer came down with laryngitis and did not perform. Rob has to decide how he will deal with Laura when he gets home. Laura confesses to Rob that she feels bad that she was initially angry with him. Jamie Farr as Delivery Boy.
5	5	"Oh How We Met on the Night That We Danced"	Robert Butler	Carl Reiner	October 31, 1961	6
Laura finds Rob's old Army coat and combat boots in their closet. Rob tells Ritchie that he broke Laura's toes with those boots. Laura used to dance with a USO show. Rob tells Ricthie how he met Laura. Flashback to when Rob was in the Army. Rob tells his Army buddy Sol Pomeroy (Marty Ingels) that he'll be the MC for the show that night. Rob sees Laura and is infatuated with her. He learns she's a dancer with the show and her name is Laura Meeker. Rob asks her out, but she wants nothing to do with him. Rob tells Sol that he's going to marry Laura. That night, Rob pays Laura's dance partner, Mark Mullen, to let him dance with Laura. Rob winds up stepping on her foot and breaking her toes. Back to the present. Laura tells Ritchie that Rob would visit her in the hospital every day. That is when she learned what a great guy he was. Song: Dick and Mary perform "You Wonderful You".
6	6	"Harrison B. Harding of Camp Crowder, Mo."	John Rich	Carl Reiner	November 6, 1961	8
Harrison B. Harding (Allan Melvin) stops by the office and claims he's an old Army buddy of Rob's from Camp Crowder. Rob pretends to recognize Harrison, but he really doesn't. He doesn't even remember the name. Harrison knows a lot about Rob and even knows Laura. Rob tries to get rid of Harrison, but winds up accepting a dinner invitation from him. Harrison says Rob will get to meet his wife Evelyn (June Dayton). Rob calls Laura, who says she's already started cooking dinner. Rob winds up inviting Harrison to the house. After they arrive, Rob starts to suspect that Harrison is a con man. Rob overhears Harrison talking to Ritchie about Rob's wristwatch. Rob now thinks Harrison is also a jewel thief. Rob calls the police. After Harrison tells Ritchie how he and Rob met, Rob finally remembers Harrison. Rob learns that Harrison is a jeweler. He wanted to see Rob's watch because he was the one that engraved it and forgot a letter in Rob's name. The policeman (Peter Leeds) shows up and Rob has to come up with a story.
7	7	"Jealousy!"	Sheldon Leonard	Carl Reiner	November 7, 1961	3
Neighbors Jerry (Jerry Paris) and Millie Helper (Ann Morgan Guilbert) are making plans with Laura for their bridge game that night. Jerry stokes Laura's insecurities when he learns that Valerie Blake (Joan Staley), a physically attractive actress, will be the guest star on The Alan Brady Show. Jerry then says Rob will probably call saying he has to work late. At the office, Mel tells Rob, Sally and Buddy that Alan wants the sketch rewritten that night. Rob lets Sally leave because she has a date and Sally kisses him. Rob also lets Buddy go. He calls Laura with the bad news and says he has to bring the sketch to Valerie. Rob doesn't get home til four in the morning. The next night, Rob has to work late again. Laura finds Rob's handkerchief with Sally's lipstick on it. Soon Laura's jealousy begins to grow. The next morning, Jerry comes by and teases Rob about Valerie. Rob says that as a dentist, Jerry has to do emergency work at night. After setting up a movie date with Laura, Rob has to call her back to say he has to work late again. Mel, Sally, Buddy and Rob are working in Valerie's hotel room. Laura comes by and realizes that there's nothing between Rob and Valerie.
8	8	"To Tell or Not to Tell"	John Rich	Frank Tarloff (Note: Frank Tarloff was credited as "David Adler" due to being blacklisted.)	November 14, 1961	11
Sally and Buddy are entertaining at a party that Rob and Laura are hosting. After Rob does a skit, Buddy and Sally asks Laura to dance and she has a great time. At work, Buddy warns Rob that Laura might want to get back into show business. Mel asks Rob if he would ask Laura whether she could serve as a temporary replacement for one of the show's dancers. Rob believes she'll turn it down. Rob calls her and Laura accepts the offer. Consequently, Rob takes over the household chores, for which he has no aptitude. Rob gets upset when the Delivery Boy (Jamie Farr) at the office stares at Laura in her rehearsal leotards. Rob is personally conflicted over Mel's wish to offer Laura a full time contract. After the show, Laura comes home and asks Rob if she was any good. She isn't sure because Mel didn't say anything to her. Rob tells her about Mel's offer. While Laura is very excited and flattered, she admits she can't physically do it anymore. Shep Houghton as Party Guest. Mickey Manners as Party guest.
9	9	"The Unwelcome Houseguest"	Robert Butler	Carl Reiner	November 21, 1961	7
Buddy and his wife Pickles are unable to bring their German Shepherd, Larry, with them on a three-day weekend. Buddy asks Rob to care for the dog, but Rob refuses because he doesn't think Laura would go for the idea. Somehow Buddy convinces Rob, because Rob tries to sneak Larry into the house. Rob overhears Laura and Ritchie talking about possibly going to Connecticut. Laura says that they have to discuss things with Rob that effect the family. When Rob tries to talk them out of the trip, Laura discovers he brought a dog home. Ritchie is afraid because he thinks that Larry is a wolf. Rob puts Larry in the garage. Laura wants the dog gone, but Rob asks her to give Larry a chance. Larry is very friendly to Laura, but Ritchie is still afraid. Laura can't sleep because Larry is crying. Rob brings Larry in the house and tries various ways to make the dog comfortable. Rob figures out that Larry doesn't want to be alone. In the morning, Laura and Rob learn that Larry slept with Ritchie and Ritchie likes the dog.
10	10	"The Meershatz Pipe"	Sheldon Leonard	Carl Reiner	November 28, 1961	2
Rob and Buddy are disagreeing over the jokes for the show. Buddy shows off his Meershatz pipe that he says Alan Brady gave him. Buddy was at Alan's home last night. Rob is envious and goes home. He tells Laura that Buddy's been getting gifts and dinner invitations from Alan all week. Rob thinks that as head writer, he should get some of Alan's appreciation. The next morning, Rob is not feeling well and Laura insists he stay home. Rob says he needs to protect his job. Rob calls Buddy and Buddy mentions how much Alan liked the sketch he and Sally gave him. Buddy says that he needs to have a conference with Alan about next weeks show. Rob is getting more and more insecure about his job. The next morning Rob sneaks out and goes to work. Mel wants Rob to leave as he could be contagious. Rob feels unneeded. Rob and Laura are watching Alan's show and Laura can't stop laughing. Rob wants to call Alan and resign, before he gets fired. While on the show, Alan calls Rob and tells him how much he's needed and to get well fast. When Rob returns to the office, Buddy confesses that Alan didn't give him the pipe or any other gifts. Buddy made it up.
11	11	"Forty-Four Tickets"	John Rich	Carl Reiner	December 5, 1961	10
Rob gets upset that Ritchie keeps forgeting to pick up his toys. Rob tripped over one. Rob forgets what day it is. The next night, Rob and Laura are playing bridge with Jerry and Millie. Jerry reminds Rob that he invited the PTA to the next Alan Brady Show. Rob won't admit that he forgot to get the forty four tickets. Rob calls Mel, but he can only come up with four. Mrs. Billings (Eleanor Audley), of the PTA, comes by for the tickets. Rob says it would be better if he held onto them until the night of the show. It's the day of the show and Rob only comes up with a couple more tickets. Rob and Laura are in the lobby of the theater. Rob tries to buy tickets from some patrons. The people of the PTA arrive. Rob is about to tell them the truth. Rob learns from Mel that they need several extras for the show. The PTA will be allowed to see the show because they'll be in it. Paul Bryar as Policeman. Joe Devlin as Shabby Man. Shep Houghton as Theatre Patron.
12	12	"Empress Carlotta's Necklace"	James Komack	Carl Reiner	December 12, 1961	13
Mel introduces his jeweler cousin, Maxwell Cooley (Gavin MacLeod), to Rob, Sally and Buddy. Mel thought they may be interested in some of Maxwell's items. Sally and Buddy each buy something. Rob sees a very large and gaudy necklace. Maxwell says it's a copy of one belonging to Empress Carlotta. Rob's not sure Laura will like it, but he's fascinated by the history behind it. At home, Laura can't bring herself to tell Rob she hates it. Jerry really likes the necklace, but Millie doesn't. Laura tells Millie that she'll tell Rob the truth later. Laura tries, but can't do it. The next night Rob has his parents, Sam (Will Wright) and Clara, come over to see the necklace. Clara thinks the necklace is absolutely beautiful. Laura asks Rob if he'd mind if she gave to necklace to Clara as a birthday gift. Rob actually thinks it's a kind gesture. Rob gets Laura a small and simple necklace and she really likes it. But he does say he'll keep looking for another Empress Carlotta necklace.
13	13	"Sally is a Girl"	John Rich	Frank Tarloff	December 19, 1961	12
Laura calls the office and invites Buddy and Sally over for dinner. She wants Buddy to bring Pickles (Barbara Perry). Laura has a date for Sally, Ted Harris (Paul Tripp). He's the brother of a friend. That night, Laura notices how Buddy and Rob treat Sally as "one of the guys". And they do it in front of Ted. After everyone is gone, Laura tells Rob that he needs to treat Sally more like a lady. Rob realizes that Laura is right. The next day at the office, Sally wonders what's going on when Rob is so nice and flattering to her. After a week of this, Buddy tells Mel that he thinks Rob and Sally are having an affair. Buddy confronts Sally and tells her she has to give Rob up. He says that Rob has a crush on her. When Buddy finally confronts Rob, he makes Rob believe that Sally is in love with him. At home, Rob tells Laura about Sally and that she kissed him. Sally comes by with Ted. Sally knew what Rob was up to the whole time. Jamie Farr as Delivery Boy. Note: It is learned that Pickles real name is Fiona.
14	14	"Buddy, Can You Spare a Job?"	James Komack	Walter Kempley	December 26, 1961	14
Rob tells Laura he was offered the head writer's job at "The Dan Howard Show". It would mean more money, but he turned it down because Dan's too hard to work for. The next day at the office, Buddy tells Rob and Sally that he went to see Dan Howard and will take the job. Buddy needs their help getting out of his contract with Alan. Mel would love to get rid of Buddy, but he says that Alan wants him. Mel does agree to help Rob and Sally make up a memo to Alan about Buddy's pure job performance. Later, Buddy comes by Rob's house. Buddy doesn't get the Dan Howard job because Dan heard about the memo. Rob and Sally come up with a plan to make it look as though they can't work without another writer. Mel tells them to hire anyone they want except Buddy. Rob comes up with the idea to hire someone that would annoy Mel more than Buddy. They get nightclub comedian Jackie Brewster (Lennie Weinrib) to insult Mel. The plan works and Mel wants Buddy back.
15	15	"Where Did I Come From?"	John Rich	Carl Reiner	January 3, 1962	19
Rob is a little uncomfortable when Ritchie asks "Where did I come from?". Rob starts to tell the story. Flashback to days before Ritchie was born. Rob and Laura are in bed and Rob asks her how she feels. She tells him to go to sleep. Laura finds out that Rob is sleeping in his suit. The next morning, Millie calls Laura. Rob thinks Laura took a cab to the hospital when she isn't in the bedroom. He finds her in the kitchen. Several days later, Millie finds Rob's car running with no one in it. He wanted to have it ready in case it was time. Laura wants Rob to go to work. He is still a nervous wreck. At the office, Sally and Buddy remind Rob there's a staff conference today. Rob is worried because he's wearing a wrinkled suit. Sally calls the cleaners. Mel wants to talk to Rob about the show. Willie the coffee man (Herbie Faye) comes by. Then the Dry Cleaning Man. Laura calls and Rob hits his eye with the phone. A Cabbie (Tiny Brauer) comes to the house. Rob comes home and locks bumpers with the cab. Charlie (Jerry Hausner), the driver of the laundry truck, takes Laura and Rob to the hospital. Back to the present, Ritchie laughs about Rob getting a black eye and losing his pants. Note: This episode was colorized and broadcast on CBS on December 14, 2018.)
16	16	"The Curious Thing About Women"	John Rich	Frank Tarloff	January 10, 1962	17
Laura has a habit of opening Rob's mail. He doesn't mind her opening the mail as much as he minds her reading it before he can. They have a little fight and Laura apologizes. At the office, Rob tells Sally and Buddy about Laura's habit. Buddy thinks they should do a sketch about it. Sally says to make it about female curiosity. Millie and Jerry are over to watch The Alan Brady Show. Before it starts, Laura, not knowing the topic of the sketch, tells them that she was its inspiration. The wife in the sketch is named Laura. Laura starts getting calls about the sketch and the people think she's really like that. Rob comes home and Laura is furious. The next day at the office, Rob tells Sally how upset Laura was. He had to sleep in the den. Buddy comes in and says the sketch is getting great reviews. Rob gets the last laugh when the self-inflating raft he ordered arrives and Laura, unable to control her curiosity, opens it and it expands.
17	17	"Punch Thy Neighbor"	John Rich	Carl Reiner	January 17, 1962	18
Millie and Jerry are over watching The Alan Brady Show with Rob and Laura. The others enjoyed it, but Jerry says it was rotten. Jerry then claims he was joking. Rob tells Jerry he needs to be careful because one day someone will take him seriously and punch him. Officer Jack Bain (Peter Leeds) comes by. Jack says that he has some relatives coming to town and would like some tickets to the show. Jerry starts teasing and tells Jack tonight's show was rotten. Rob accidentally spills coffee on Jerry's leg. The next morning little Freddie Helper (Peter Oliphant) comes by and tells Ritchie that his mother will drive them to school. Freddie says that his daddy told him the show last night was rotten. Vinnie the milkman (Jerry Hausner) comes by. Vinnie mentions that Jerry says the show was bad. Jerry sends Rob a singing telegram about the show being rotten. Rob accidentally hits Jerry in the nose while at a restaurant. Jerry was telling that waitress how bad the show was. When Rob tries to show Laura what happened, he accidentally hits her in the nose. Some more misunderstandings occur between Rob and Jerry. Rob finally convinces Jerry that some kidding can be hurtful.
18	18	"Who Owes Who What?"	John Rich	Carl Reiner	January 24, 1962	15
Laura's going over the family's finances and finds a check made out to cash and endorsed by Buddy. It was a $25 loan, and Rob realizes that Buddy never paid him back. Rob feels funny about asking Buddy for the money because it's been six months. At the office, Buddy and Mel trade insults. Rob brought with him the check and tries showing it to Buddy. Rob drops some hints. Buddy winds up borrowing a dollar from Rob. At home, Rob lies and tells Laura that Buddy paid back the money. She is proud of Rob and apologizes. Rob tells Jerry about Buddy. Jerry thinks it's a hint and pays Rob the two dollars he won on a bet they had. Jerry suggests Rob write a comedy sketch about people owing money as a hint to Buddy. Laura learns that Rob didn't get the money from Buddy. At the office, Buddy tells Sally that Rob owes him $25 and it's been six months. Rob, Sally and Buddy perform the owing money sketch for Mel, who is not impressed. Something Buddy says makes Rob realize he owes Buddy the money.
19	19	"The Talented Neighborhood"	John Rich	Carl Reiner	January 31, 1962	22
Rob and Laura are watching Alan Brady. On his show, Alan announces his annual search for the most talented child. He asks parents to send a picture of their child to him. Jerry comes by and hints to Rob about getting his daughter Ellen an audition. Rob's afraid if he helps Ellen, everyone in the neighborhood will want the same favor. Rob starts getting phone calls from other parents. Sally brings two kids from her neighborhood to the office. Mel thinks they should go through the same procedure as everyone else. Rob brings in several kids and so does Buddy. At home, Mrs. Kendall (Doris Singleton) brings her son Ken over to see Rob. Ken sings for Rob and is not very good. New neighbor George Mathias (Ken Lynch) calls Rob about his children and Rob is very rude to him. The next morning Ritchie brings the Mathias children, Philip (Barry Livingston), Martin and Annie, into Rob and Laura's bedroom while they're still asleep. Rob sends them away. Later in the day, George comes by. It turns out that George only called Rob because he was looking for a friend for his son Philip. George didn't even know about the contest. Rob gets talked into seeing Martin dance. Martin winds up being an incredible flamenco dancer. Barry Van Dyke as Florian.
20	20	"A Word a Day"	John Rich	Jack Raymond	February 7, 1962	21
Rob and Laura are surprised when Ritchie can actually read some words in the newspaper. Laura mentions that Ritchie has a new friend. Tommy Kirk just moved in nearby. Ritchie says Tommy is older and says words that Ritchie doesn't understand. At the office, Rob shows Buddy and Sally an encyclopedia for children that he bought for Ritchie. Laura calls Rob and tells him that Ritchie said a bad word while in the car. Laura didn't say anything to Ritchie and thinks they should just let it go. Rob thinks he should talk to Ritchie. At home, Rob talks to Ritchie. Ritchie says he won't say that word anymore. At the Office, Laura calls Rob and tells him that Ritchie wrote a different bad word on the school blackboard. At home, Rob and Laura start to think that Ritchie is getting the bad words from Tommy. Rob calls the Kirk house to tell them off. When Mrs. Kirk answers, Rob gives the phone to Laura. Instead of telling Mrs. Kirk off, Laura invites them over. Mrs. Kirk and the Rev. Kirk (William Schallert) arrive. They wind up having a nice talk about the situation.
21	21	"The Boarder Incident"	John Rich	Norm Liebmann and Ed Haas	February 14, 1962	20
Buddy's wife Pickles is away for 3 weeks to take care of her mother. Rob and Sally discover that Buddy's been sleeping in the office. Buddy can't stay at home because everything there reminds him of Pickles. Rob tells Buddy he can move into his guest room. Sally doesn't think it's a good idea. Buddy arrives at the house with a lot of luggage, his cello and his dog Larry. Buddy accidentally breaks Laura favorite china cups. Buddy and Larry are keeping Rob and Laura awake at night. Larry chews up the newspaper and the mail. After some time, Rob and Laura start bickering with each other. Laura thinks Rob should ask Buddy to leave. One morning Buddy offers to make breakfast. Rob and Laura wind up running around getting things for Buddy and he makes a big mess of the kitchen. Rob tells Laura that he'll ask Buddy to move out when they get to the office. At the office, Buddy tells Rob that he'll move out because he feels he's being a bother. Rob tries to be polite and says Buddy isn't a bother and Buddy then says that he'll stay. Sally tells Buddy that Pickles called and she'll be coming home that night. Rob and Laura find they can't sleep because it's too quiet in the house.
22	22	"Father of the Week"	John Rich	Arnold and Lois Peyser	February 21, 1962	23
Laura finds a note in Ritchie's pants that states Rob is "Father of the Week" for Ritchie's class. Rob's supposed to be at school the next afternoon. Laura calls Rob and tells him the news. Rob tells her that he'll rearrange things at work. Ritchie tells Laura that he doesn't want Rob to go. Rob will talk about being a comedy writer and Ritchie doesn't think that is interesting. Plus he won't have anything to show the class. When Rob gets home, Laura tells him how Ritchie feels. Laura still thinks Rob should go. Rob talks to Ritchie and realizes that he wouldn't know what to say to the class. Rob tells Laura he's not going. Rob does wind up going. Mrs. Given (Isabel Randolph), Ritchie's teacher, introduces Rob to the class. At first, Rob isn't doing too well. Rob winds up entertaining the children and is a big hit. Note: This episode is partly based on the original pilot, "Head of the Family".
23	23	"The Twizzle"	John Rich	Carl Reiner	February 28, 1962	24
Sally comes by and introduces singer Randy Twizzle to Rob and Laura. Randy also invented a new dance called the Twizzle. Sally wants to get Randy on Alan's show. Randy says the dance and song are nothing special. Sally has Buddy and Mel come by. They all go to the bowling alley where Randy performs. There's a large crowd of people dancing while Randy sings. Mel immediately signs him to the show. Rob notices that Randy doesn't seem that excited. It's two days before the show. Sally and Buddy come to Rob's for dinner. Mel calls and tells them that Randy said he doesn't think he can do the show and Mel hasn't seen him since. Rob thinks Randy's holding out for more money. Randy shows up with his manager father, Mr. Eisenbauer (Jack Albertson). Mr. Eisenbauer says they're not interested in money. Randy would like to perform another song along with the Twizzle. Randy's afraid that if the Twizzle catches on, he'll be stuck only performing that type of music. He has other musical ambitions. Freddie Blassie as himself. Robert Banas as Twizzle Dancer. Songs: Jerry Lanning sings "The Twizzle" and "This Nearly Was Mine".
24	24	"One Angry Man"	John Rich	Leo Solomon and Ben Gershman	March 7, 1962	25
Rob gets called for jury duty. Rob wants to get out of writing next week's script and is happy to serve. Without Rob knowing it, Laura and Sally arrive in the courtroom. The defendant, Marla Hendrix (Sue Ane Langdon), enters with her attorney, Mr. Berger (Dabbs Greer). The Bailiff (Doodles Weaver) announces Judge George M. Tyler (Howard Wendell). Marla is accused of trying to smuggle diamonds into the country. Marla is a beautiful, but not-so-bright, former exotic dancer. Laura notices that Rob seems to be attracted to Marla. The courtroom starts to notice as well. At home, Laura confronts Rob about his gawking at Marla. Rob now knows Laura was there. Laura thinks Rob should remove himself as foreman of the jury, but he won't. During the jury deliberation, everyone finds Marla guilty except Rob. It's been over eleven hours and Rob won't back down. Back at home, Rob is working with Buddy and Sally. Laura asks Rob how many men voted Marla innocent, but he won't say he was the only one. Marla calls the house and Laura learns Rob was the only hold out. Marla tells Rob that there was a slight mix up and she was proven innocent. Lee Bergere as Mr. Mason, the prosecutor. Herb Vigran, Patsy Kelly and Herbie Faye as jurors.
25	25	"Where You Been, Fassbinder?"	John Rich	John Whedon	March 14, 1962	26
Sally, Buddy and Pickles are at Rob and Laura's house for dinner. Sally tells Ritchie that her birthday is next Friday. Ritchie asks her how old she is and why she isn't married. After everyone leaves, Laura feels bad that Sally has to go home to an empty house. At the office, Rob and Buddy suggest they get together for Sally's birthday. Mel tells her that a man came by looking for her. Mel didn't get a name. At her apartment, Sally gets a call from an old friend from high school, Leo Fassbinder (George N. Neise). He's the man that stopped at the office. Sally invites him over for Friday night. It's Friday and Rob, Laura, Buddy and Pickles plan to go to Sally's to surprise her. Rob has second thoughts as Sally may have a date. Laura calls Sally and she says that Leo is coming over. Buddy thinks Sally is making it up. Leo arrives at Sally's place. Leo misunderstands a call Sally gets and thinks she already has a date. As a cover, he tells her he's there to sell her some more insurance. Disappointed, she asks him to leave. Rob, Laura, Buddy, Pickles and Mel arrive. Sally, not wanting them to think she was stood up, says Leo is still coming by. After they all leave, Leo does actually come back, and Sally and Leo work out the misunderstandings.
26	26	"I Am My Brother's Keeper"	John Rich	Carl Reiner	March 21, 1962	28
Laura calls Rob at the office and tells him he got a telegram from his brother Stacey (Jerry Van Dyke). Stacey has a two week furlough and is coming for a visit. Stacey asks to have Rob book him a hotel room. Laura learns that Stacey calls Rob "Burford". Laura wants Stacey to stay in the guest room. At home, Rob tells Laura how shy Stacey is. Just then Stacey shows up and he's anything but shy. Rob explains to Laura that his shy brother has a problem. He is a sleepwalker who's the life of the party, when he's sound asleep. Shy Stacey comes out of his room. He says he hasn't been sleep walking since he was fourteen. It started again last week. The doctors thinks it may be his uncertainty about what he'll do after he's discharged. Stacey tells them he'd like to be a banjo playing comedian. Stacey tries to do a routine for them, but it isn't going well. Later that night, Rob is throwing a party for Stacey. The fun Stacy entertains the guests then falls asleep. Mel would like to have Stacey audition for the show. After everyone leaves, Rob and Laura tell Stacey how much fun he was. Note: Part 1 of 2
27	27	"The Sleeping Brother"	John Rich	Carl Reiner	March 28, 1962	29
Rob and Laura come home to find Stacey entertaining Jerry Helper. Rob tells Jerry that Stacey is a sleepwalker. Something Jerry says gives Rob the idea to record Stacey while he's entertaining so he can hear what he's like. After he wakes up, Rob plays Stacey the tape. Stacey can't come up with that same energy. Stacey thinks Rob should call off the audition. Rob wants to have another party and have Alan Brady over. Rob remembers that Saturday is Alan's poker night. At the office, Mel helps Rob to get Alan to come to the party. It's party time and Sally is performing. Then it's Buddy turn. In the kitchen, Stacey tells Rob that he won't be able to perform and goes to his room. Rob and Laura perform. An energetic Stacey comes out of his room and entertains. Rob knows he's asleep. Alan loves it and wants Stacey on the show. Turns out Stacey was actually awake. He tells Rob he listened to the tape again and got the courage. Songs: Jerry performs "(Won't You Come Home) Bill Bailey". Rose Marie sings "Crying My Heart Out for You". Mary and Dick sing "Mountain Greenery". Note: Part 2 of 2. Carl Reiner appears as Alan Brady for the first time.
28	28	"The Bad Old Days"	John Rich	Norm Liebmann and Ed Haas	April 4, 1962	27
At the office, Rob, Sally and Buddy are working on a sketch about the turn of the century. Buddy says that was a great time to live. The men were in charge back then. Men nowadays are henpecked. Rob claims that he says no to Laura a lot. That night Jerry comes by and asks Rob if he wants to go bowling. Laura guilt's Rob into staying home. Laura asks Rob to bring in the laundry from outside. Jerry teases Rob. Rob starts to feel he does too much housework. He complains to Laura, but she thinks he's being silly. That night Rob has a dream about the good old days, when a man was the master of his house. Laura does all the work around the house and Ritchie works in a factory. Rob lives the life of leisure and orders them around. Rob wakes up and is glad things are the way they are.
29	29	"Sol and the Sponsor"	John Rich	Walter Kempley	April 11, 1962	16
Rob is expecting Henry Bermont (Roy Roberts) and his wife Martha (Isabel Randolph) for dinner. Henry is an important sponsor of the show. Rob's old Army buddy, Sol Pomeroy (Marty Ingels), unexpectedly stops by. Sol is passing through on his way to Connecticut. Rob would love for Sol to spend the weekend. Rob is worried because he doesn't think that Sol and Henry are very compatible. Sol is excited when he hears about the dinner party. Sol misunderstands Rob when he tries to subtly tell him he would make the dinner awkward. Sol invites Arlene Johnson to come to dinner to be his date. It's almost time for dinner. Rob and Laura think Sol went out on a date. They have mixed feelings about getting Sol to go out that evening. Henry and Martha arrive and they are very reserved. Rob is stunned when Sol and Arlene show up. Henry gets upset when Sol insults his car. They get into an argument and go outside to settle it. Turns out they went outside to look over Henry's car. Sol adjusts things on the motor and Henry says it's never run smoother. Song: Dick and Mary sing "You Wonderful You".
30	30	"The Return of Happy Spangler"	John Rich	Carl Reiner	April 18, 1962	30
At a men's tie store, Laura strikes up a conversation with the clerk. When Laura mentions that her husband is a comedy writer, the clerk asks his name. Laura says it's Robert Petrie. The clerk says he knows Rob and gave him his first job in show business. He gives Laura a clue as to who he is. At home, Rob thinks the clerk could be Happy Spangler (Jay C. Flippen). Rob goes to the store and speaks with Happy. Happy tells Rob how he wound up selling ties. To repay Happy, Rob would like to find him a job. At the office, Mel agrees to give Happy a temporary writing job. Happy comes by and meets everyone. Rob does an impersonation of Alan rejecting a script. Rob wants to get to work, but Happy starts telling about his years as a radio writer. It's been a couple weeks and Rob, Sally and Buddy are putting in long hours and even working at Rob's house because they're always behind. Buddy and Sally complain about Happy always distracting them with old stories. Rob will hate to do it, but he knows he has to confront Happy. Rob talks to Happy and Happy knows he needs to resign. Rob thinks that maybe he wasn't strict enough and he wants to see if they can still get Happy to be creative. Thanks to something Happy suggested, Rob comes up with a funny skit.

=== Season 2 (1962–1963) ===
- Season 2 of The Dick Van Dyke Show consisted of 32 black-and-white half-hour episodes.
- Beginning with this season, The Dick Van Dyke Show introduced a new opening sequence, which consisted of two (later three) versions, which were filmed after filming "The Two Faces Of Rob". The opening credits featuring photographs of the show's characters, as well as the text reading their names onscreen, were discontinued. The new opening credits took place in the Petrie's living room: one has Rob tripping over the ottoman, and the other has him sidestepping the ottoman. At some point, a third opening started appearing. In this third version, Rob sidesteps the ottoman, but then trips over his feet, only to be set upright by the character Sally Rogers. These versions remained in use, interchangeably between episodes, until the show's run ended on June 1, 1966.
- Beginning with the episode "It May Look Like a Walnut", the episode title began appearing onscreen.

No. overall	No. in season	Title	Directed by	Written by	Original release date	Prod. code
31	1	"Never Name a Duck"	John Rich	Carl Reiner	September 26, 1962	31
Mel leaves some toy props from the show with Rob. Mel says that Rob, Sally and Buddy can do what they want with them. Rob finds two live baby ducks. Rob says he can't take them because he brought home baby chicks once. Laura and Ritchie were very upset when they died. Rob changes his mind. At home Laura tells Rob to get rid of the ducks. Ritchie sees them and names them Oliver and Stanley. After three months Oliver dies and Ritchie becomes very attached to Stanley. Stanley has grown quite a bit and Laura thinks they should put the duck in a lake. Laura notices that Stanley is acting the way Oliver did before he died. Rob takes the duck to a Veterinarian. At the Vet's, Miss Singleton (Jane Dulo) is there with her dog. Miss Glasset (Geraldine Wall) has her cat. Rob is surprised when Mr. Fletcher (Jerry Hausner) leaves with his kangaroo. Rob comes home without Stanley and says the duck is in a lake. It's not easy, but Rob explains to Ritchie that some pets are happier living in the wild. Not knowing what Rob did with Stanley, Buddy and Sally come by with another duck to keep Stanley company. It's off to the lake they go.
32	2	"The Two Faces of Rob"	John Rich	Sheldon Keller and Howard Merrill	October 3, 1962	32
Rob, Buddy and Sally are having a hard time coming up with a sketch. The Deli Man (Herbie Faye) comes by and gets involved. Rob comes up the idea that a guy wants to play poker, but his wife has a dinner party planned. The guy calls his wife, disguises his voice and claims that her husband has to work late. Sally and Buddy think that a wife would recognize her husband's voice, even if he tried to disguise it. To prove he's right, Rob calls Laura, disguises his voice, and pretends to be Italian Dr. Benno Benelli. Rob starts flirting with Laura and she flirts back. Now Rob wonders if Laura knew it was him or actually flirted with a stranger. When Rob gets home, there's a romantic table set and Laura is dressed up. Laura says she was inspired to make an Italian dinner. The phone rings and Laura races to answer it. It's Millie. The next day, Rob still believes Laura was flirting with a stranger. Buddy thinks Rob should call Laura as Dr. Benelli and ask her for a date at a restaurant. Rob does and Laura accepts the date. Millie is there and Laura tells her it was Rob. That night Rob comes home and no ones there. Laura comes home and asks Rob why he didn't show up. Rob apologizes and explains everything. Songs: Rose sings "All of Me". Mary sings "Dolce Far Niente" to the tune of "Santa Lucia".
33	3	"The Attempted Marriage"	John Rich	Carl Reiner	October 10, 1962	34
Ritchie finds a silver tray that was a wedding gift. The writing on it implies that Rob and Laura almost didn't get married. Ritchie wants to know what happened. Flashback to when Rob and Laura are in a jeep that's parked in the forest. Rob nervously asks Laura to marry him and she accepts. They set the following Sunday as the date. That Sunday everyone is at the Chapel except Rob. Rob is parked in the forest and he has a case of cold feet. He wants to head to the Chapel but the jeep won't start. While checking the engine, he drops the key in the radiator. Rob decides to walk and sprains his ankle. When he finally gets to the Chapel, no ones there. Laura comes back. Despite Laura being upset, Rob explains what happened. The next Sunday a Doctor (Sandy Kenyon) is looking at Rob's ankle. Turns out Rob has a respiratory tract infection. The Doctor wants to keep Rob in the hospital, but Rob says he's supposed to get married. Rob sneaks out and gets to the Chapel. Rob has trouble hearing Chaplain Berger (Dabbs Greer) and ruins the ceremony. Laura storms out. They finally get married later that day in the hospital. Ray Kellogg as Corporal.
34	4	"Bank Book 6565696"	John Rich	R.S. Allen (Note: Credited as Ray Allen Saffian) and Harvey Bullock	October 17, 1962	33
Rob claims he's fixed the toaster and Laura doesn't have to buy a new one. It still burns the toast. Jerry comes by and returns Rob's movie projector. Jerry has he had problems with it and Rob should get a new one. Rob was looking for a handkerchief and discovers Laura's secret bank account book. There's over three hundred dollars in it. At the office, Rob tells Buddy and Sally about Laura's bank account. What Rob wonders about is why Laura is keeping it a secret. Rob then realizes that tomorrow is his birthday and thinks it might be for a new movie projector. She needs a little more money than she has for the projector. Laura comes by the office because she was shopping in town. Rob comes up with an excuse to give Laura the extra money she needs. When Rob gets home, he looks around for the hidden projector. Laura catches him and decides to give him the present early. Jerry comes by to borrow the old projector again and Rob says he can keep it. But instead of the projector, Rob receives a shirt. The next day, Sally and Buddy give Rob a movie screen. All Rob can think about is Laura's secret account. Rob finally confronts Laura about it. Laura said that it might have taken a couple years, but she was saving up to buy him a sports car. Rob feels terrible for ever having asked.
35	5	"Hustling the Hustler"	John Rich	Carl Reiner	October 24, 1962	35
At the office, Rob, Sally and Buddy are working on a sketch. Mel comes by and wants Rob and Sally to present it to Alan. Buddy is not happy when his kid brother Blackie (Phil Leeds) shows up. Blackie says he's in a legitimate real estate business now and hasn't played pool in five years. Buddy doesn't believe Blackie and wants him to leave. Blackie says he'll prove he's changed and leaves. Later after Sally and Buddy go home, Blackie comes back and meets Rob. Blackie wanted to show Buddy something. Rob invites him to his house for dinner. Not knowing of his past as a pool hustler, Rob mentions he has a pool table. After dinner, Rob shows Blackie the pool table in the basement. Rob makes out like he's a great player and Blackie pretends he doesn't know much about pool. They start betting on the games and Blackie winds up owing Rob $300. Rob agrees to another bet. Buddy comes by the house. Not knowing Blackie is there, he tells Laura he feels bad about how he treated his brother. Rob learns that Blackie is a pool hustler. Buddy finds out that Blackie is there. Blackie wins the last game and Rob writes him a check. Blackie goes on to prove to Rob and Buddy that he has gone legit by tearing up the check. This episode features one of the show's more notable unscripted moments; when Rob asked Laura to finish their round of pool before she could watch something on television, she did so reluctantly. The plan was for her to attempt a trick shot, then the camera was to cut away to a top-down view of a professional pool player completing the shot. However, to her and Rob's shock, she nailed the shot on the first take. Song: Dick, Rose and Morey sing "Moonlight Bay".
36	6	"My Husband is Not a Drunk"	Alan Rafkin	Carl Reiner	October 31, 1962	37
Rob and Laura invite Army pal Glen Jameson (Charles Aidman) to a dinner party with Buddy, Sally, Jerry and Millie. Glen happens to also be a hypnotist. After dinner, Millie begs to be hypnotized. Glen makes Millie think that Jerry is Rock Hudson. Glen then hypnotizes Laura and has her be the person she most admires, which turns out to be Abraham Lincoln. Glen does the same with Jerry, and it turns out to be himself. Glen tries to hypnotize Buddy into acting drunk whenever he hears a bell ring. Another bell ring will make him normal again. Buddy pretends to be under, but it is Rob, who is watching from the kitchen, that really gets hypnotized. Not knowing that Rob was under, Glen leaves without removing the spell. The next morning, Rob is at the office. The phone rings and Rob becomes drunk. It rings again and he's sober. Mel tells Rob that Mr. Boland (Roy Roberts), a sponsor, wants to speak with him. The phone rings and Mel and Boland see Rob drunk. Boland thinks Rob is working on a comedy sketch. The phone rings again. Rob figures out that he's been hypnotized. He calls Glen and tells him to come over to remove the spell.
37	7	"What's in a Middle Name?"	John Rich	Carl Reiner	November 7, 1962	36
Ritchie asks Rob if he has a middle name as his friends have. He then shows Rob his birth certificate that he found. Ritchie asks if his middle name is Rosebud. Laura says they'll talk about when he comes home from school. After Ritchie leaves, Laura reminds Rob that Rosebud was his idea. Flashback to the day that Laura told Rob she was pregnant. Laura comes by the old office. Rob and Buddy are busy in Alan's office. Sally can sense that Laura wants to tell Rob she's pregnant. Rob hears the news and then everyone else does. Sally, Buddy and Mel all have suggestions for a name. Rob came up with Rosebud as a compromise because it used letters from all the names the parents suggested. R: Robert, O: Oscar, S: Sam, E: Edward, B: Benjamin, U: Ulysses, D: David. Back to the present, Rob explains to Ritchie that he actually has seven middle names and Ritchie is happy about it. Carl Benton Reid and Geraldine Wall as Mr. and Mrs. Meehan, Laura's parents. J. Pat O'Malley and Isabel Randolph as Sam and Clara Petrie, Rob's parents. Cyril Delevanti as Grandpa Petrie.
38	8	"Like a Sister"	Hal Cooper	Carl Reiner	November 14, 1962	38
Mel comes in the office and says there's been a change to the show. Instead of Sophia Loren, singer Ric Vallone (Vic Damone) will be the guest and Mel introduces him. Sally volunteers to go to dinner with Ric to discuss the show. At home, Rob mentions to Laura that he's not worried about Sally because Ric is a confirmed bachelor. Sally and Ric come by and ask if Laura has any homemade lasagna, which she doesn't. Sally and Ric continue their search and leave. Laura tells Rob that she can tell Sally is falling for Ric. Sally and Ric spend a lot of time together and Rob is getting concerned. Sally jokes to Rob that she might propose to Ric. Rob asks Ric how he feels about Sally. While he likes her and she's fun to be with, there's nothing serious. The two come up with a way to get Sally to forget him by having Ric pretend to be an abusive drunk. Ric and Sally are over for dinner at Rob's and Ric starts acting drunk. Sally is getting disgusted with Ric and is about to leave. Ric and Rob pretend to fight and Rob knocks Ric down. Now Sally feels sorry for Ric and wants to drive him home. Ric and Sally wind up going out again. Song: Vic sings "The Most Beautiful Girl in the World".
39	9	"The Night the Roof Fell In"	Hal Cooper	John Whedon	November 21, 1962	39
Millie calls and Laura tells her what a difficult day she's had. Repair men didn't show up and Ritchie's been a terror. Rob comes home late and complains about the miserable day he had. Laura was holding dinner, but Rob said he grabbed something on the way home. She wonders why he didn't call her. They start fighting and Rob storms out of the house. The next morning, Millie comes by and Laura tells her that Rob never came home. Laura tells her about the fight, but makes it sound as though she did nothing wrong and it was all Rob's fault. Millie says Rob's probably at the office and Laura should call him. Rob tells Buddy and Sally that he spent the night in the garage. He was going to take a short drive, but forgot his keys in the house. Rob tells them about the fight and how he came home in a perfect mood and Laura did all the fighting. She even kicked him out of the house. Sally asks if he's exaggerating a little and Rob admits Laura didn't kick him out. Buddy suggests bringing Laura a surprise. Meanwhile, Laura is preparing a special Italian meal for Rob. Rob comes home and they both apologize to each other. Rob's surprise is he brought home a Chinese dinner.
40	10	"The Secret Life of Buddy and Sally"	Coby Ruskin	Lee Erwin	November 28, 1962	40
Rob is beginning to feel that Buddy and Sally are avoiding him. They haven't done anything socially in over a month. Sally and Buddy even turned down a barbecue invitation. At the office, Mel asks Rob, Buddy and Sally to give up their weekend. Alan is doing a benefit this Sunday and he needs some material. When Rob tells Buddy and Sally that they can work and have a barbecue at his house, they say they are busy. Rob overhears Buddy tell Sally that what they do on their own time is none of Rob's business. Rob tells Laura that Buddy and Sally may be moonlighting for another comedy show, which could get them fired. Rob calls Pickles and is told Buddy is away for the weekend. Rob now thinks Buddy and Sally may be having an affair. At the office, Rob asks Buddy and Sally if they are writing for another show, but they say no. Rob overhears Buddy and Sally talk about Herbie's Hiawatha Lodge and what a great weekend they had. Rob talks Laura into going to the Lodge with him. They discover that Buddy and Sally are entertaining there. Buddy and Sally see Rob and Laura and get them to do a number. Phil Arnold as Band Leader. Shep Houghton as Club Patron. Grant Tinker, Mary Tyler Moore's husband at the time, as Club Patron. Songs: Rose sings "Come Rain or Come Shine". Dick and Mary sing "Harmony".
41	11	"A Bird in the Head Hurts"	John Rich	Carl Reiner	December 5, 1962	41
Ritchie comes home screaming that "He" bit him in the head. Laura tries to calm Ritchie down and find out who "He" is. Laura calls Rob at the office and tells him that a woodpecker bit Ritchie in the head. She says that Ritchie had a fight with Freddy Helper and wound up playing by himself. Rob thinks that Ritchie is looking for sympathy and attention. Rob tells Buddy and Sally about Ritchie. Rob assumes that by tonight Ritchie will have forgotten all about it. Ritchie tells Laura that the woodpecker was in his room. Rob comes home and Laura says that Ritchie and Freddy made up. Rob decides to play along with Ritchie and say that he killed the woodpecker. Hopefully that will make Ritchie feel safe. Ritchie comes back in the house saying the woodpecker is in the front yard. Just then Millie comes by and says she's seen the woodpecker herself. It was pecking Ritchie in the head and the other kids saw it as well. Rob wonders why the bird didn't attack the other kids. He makes several calls to get help and they all hang up on him. Rob finds a way to get the Game Warden (Cliff Norton) to show up, but he isn't much help. Rob figures out that the bird wanted Ritchie's hair to build a nest. Rob is able to catch the bird using Ritchie's hair brush.
42	12	"Gesundheit, Darling"	John Rich	Carl Reiner	December 12, 1962	42
Rob, Laura, Millie and Jerry are playing cards. Rob is sneezing a lot. Laura causes her and Rob to lose the game and Rob sneezes again. Jerry suggests that the sneezes are psychosomatic and that Rob is repressing anger at Laura. Rob mentions that the sneezing started when he brought Ritchie some water. Laura starts to wonder if Rob really is mad at her for some reason. They get into a little bit of an argument. Rob is sneezing while he's sleeping and wakes Laura up. They get into another argument. Rob goes to an Allergist (Sandy Kenyon) and has some tests done. The Allergist says Rob may be allergic to Laura, but it's highly improbable. Laura is talking to Millie about Rob's sneezing. Millie mentions that Ritchie and Freddy formed a new club. Rob comes home, kisses Laura and sneezes. He says that he hadn't sneezed all day. Rob says he may be allergic to her. Rob sneezes when he hugs Ritchie. He sneezes when he gets close to Jerry and Millie. Millie mentions that the boys formed the club to take care of a kitten. That's what Rob is allergic to.
43	13	"A Man's Teeth Are Not His Own"	John Rich	Carl Reiner	December 19, 1962	43
Jerry tells Rob that he'll be at a Dentist Convention for a few days. Jerry wants Rob to come for a check up when he gets back. At the office, Sally and Buddy suggest a toothache sketch, but Rob would rather do something else. Just then Rob breaks his tooth on a chicken bone. At first they think Rob is doing a routine, but then realize what happened. Mel takes Rob to his dentist. Back at home, Rob tells Laura how great the dentist was. Rob does feel guilty going to someone else, but it was an emergency. Rob even let the dentist work on another tooth while he was there. Rob wants to ask Millie how she thinks Jerry will feel about a patient going to another dentist. Millie mentions loyalty. Jerry has been home for a week now and Rob has been avoiding him. Laura invited Jerry and Millie for brunch. Jerry senses that something is bothering Rob. He suggests that he check Rob's teeth after brunch. Jerry has Rob in his dentist's chair and Rob is trying to avoid him looking at all his teeth. Jerry thinks Rob is working on a dentist sketch. Rob finally admits he went to another dentist. Jerry understands it was an emergency and Rob is relieved.
44	14	"Somebody Has to Play Cleopatra"	John Rich	Martin Ragaway	December 26, 1962	44
Laura tells Rob that Mrs. Billings (Eleanor Audley) of the PTA is coming by. Rob says there's no way he's going to write and direct another fund-raising variety show for her. Flashback to last year and Mrs. Billings is holding a meeting in Rob's living room. Rob learns that he was made chairman. The meeting was to find a way to raise some money. Mrs. Billings suggests a variety show, but Rob says they're not easy to put on. Everyone votes Rob to run the show. Later, they are rehearsing and Rob wants to work on the Cleopatra sketch. Harry Rogers (Bob Crane) is playing Mark Antony and Millie is Cleopatra. Jerry doesn't like it when Harry has to kiss Millie. Jerry tells Rob he doesn't want Millie playing the part. Rob says he's not afraid to let Laura play the part. The two kissing does bother Rob. Rob tries to talk Laura out of the part and she knows he's jealous. They ask beautiful kindergarten teacher Cynthia Harding to play Cleopatra. Shirley (Shirley Mitchell), Harry's wife, comes by. Shirley is not happy about Harry being with Cynthia and makes him go home. Rob winds up playing Mark Antony with Jerry as Cleopatra. Back to the present and Mrs. Billings comes by. She says she won't need Rob this year, but Rob unknowingly talks his way into doing it again. Song: Mary sings "True Man True".
45	15	"The Cat Burglar"	John Rich	Carl Reiner	January 2, 1963	45
Jerry and Millie are at Rob and Laura's when they notice that Buddy and Pickles have their picture in the paper. Also in the paper is an article saying a neighbor of theirs, the Segals, were burglarized. It also says it's the fourth house broken into in the area. Jerry offers Rob one of his rifles, but Rob turns him down. While in bed, Rob and Laura hear a noise. It's Jerry by the window with the rifle, which Rob reluctantly takes. Later, they hear another noise and Rob grabs the rifle. Rob searches the house and some silly things happen to him. The next morning Millie calls Laura and tells her she was robbed of her silverware. Millie puts a policeman on the phone to talk to Rob, who asks Rob if anything is missing. Rob discovers their dining room set is gone. The police lieutenant (Barney Phillips) asks Rob if the theft might be a publicity stunt. Laura calls Rob at the office and asks him where the key to the tool shed is. The handymen that worked in the yard last week left some stuff in there. Rob tells her to stall them until he gets home. Rob locks the two handymen in the bedroom and the Lieutenant arrives. The Lieutenant confirms the men were the crooks. Johnny Silver as Newspaper Photographer.
46	16	"The Foul Weather Girl"	John Rich	Carl Reiner	January 9, 1963	46
Jane Leighton (Joan O'Brien) comes to the house to see Rob, but he is not home yet. Jane tells Laura that Rob had proposed to her. She then clears the air by saying it was part of a high school play that her and Rob were in. Rob comes home and mistaking Jane for Laura, he kisses her. Jane tells Rob that back home she is a singing weather girl at a local TV station. Jane came to New York hoping that Rob could get her some auditions. Rob says he will help her in any way he can. After she leaves, Laura tells Rob she trusts him, but she does not trust Jane. Rob brings Jane to the office and has her meet Sally and Buddy. Mel would like to hear Jane sing, but Rob says he still needs to work with her. After Jane leaves, Sally wonders what Laura thinks about Rob spending every night coaching Jane. Rob admits Laura is not happy about it. It's finally time for Jane's singing audition. Mel is very impressed and wants to set up an appearance on the show. Jane now hangs on Mel and they leave together. Rob's plan worked because now she won't bother him anymore. Song: Joan sings "Just in Time".
47	17	"Will You Two Be My Wife?"	John Rich	Carl Reiner	January 16, 1963	47
Buddy and Sally come in the office and notice Rob hiding some papers in the desk. When Rob goes to Alan's office, Buddy and Sally find what seem to be Rob's memoirs and start reading it. Flashback to Rob's time at Camp Crowder. Rob asks his Captain (Ray Kellogg) if he could have two three-day passes. One is for a honeymoon after he marrys Laura. The other pass is so he can go back home to break off his engagement with his old girlfriend Dorothy (Barbara Bain). His Captain will only give him one pass and suggests he go home. Millie tells Laura that Rob has a surprise for her and Laura guesses it's the three-day pass. Rob can't bring himself to tell Laura about Dorothy. Sam Pomerantz (Allan Melvin), Rob's Army friend, suggests that Rob write Dorothy a letter. Rob says he never actually asked Dorothy to marry him, it was just a given. Rob does go to see Dorothy and tells her about Laura. Dorothy is furious and starts throwing things at Rob. But then mentions that a Roger Mosby asked her to marry him. Back to the present, Buddy and Sally realize that's all that Rob wrote and they don't know what happened next. Rob comes back and they confess that they read the memoir. He says that he wanted them to read it. It turns out it isn't a true story, it's a manuscript and Rob hasn't decided how to end it.
48	18	"Ray Murdock's X-Ray"	Jerry Paris	Carl Reiner	January 23, 1963	48
Buddy tells Sally that Ray Murdock (Gene Lyons) called. He wants Rob on his "The Ray Murdock X-Rays" talk show. Sally and Buddy don't think that Rob should do it as Murdock can get people to say things they normally wouldn't. Rob calls Ray who assures Rob there won't be any personal questions. He'll only ask questions about how a great comedy show gets written. Rob agrees to be on the show. Rob gets to the station and speaks with the Stage Manager (Jerry Hausner). Ray arrives and the taping starts. Ray starts asking Rob about his marriage, which surprises Rob. Rob winds up describing several sketches that involve a wife doing silly and stupid things. Rob lets it slip that the sketches were inspired by real life things that his wife Laura did. Rob realizes he just inferred that Laura was a nut. After the interview Sally and Buddy arrive. They remind Rob that the show is taped and will air tonight. Rob has to prevent Laura from seeing the show. At home, Rob tries to tell Laura that there's something wrong with the TV. To keep her busy, Rob then dances with Laura. Laura gets a call from Ray Murdock's office saying Rob's interview goes on in five minutes. Laura sees the interview and is furious because her friends will think she is an idiot. Laura feels better when she is asked to do an interview for a woman's magazine.
49	19	"I Was a Teenage Head Writer"	Jerry Paris	Sheldon Keller and Howard Merrill	January 30, 1963	49
Mel tells Rob, Sally and Buddy that one of the sketches for the next show just isn't funny. Rob says that it's a good script and Mel should show it to Alan. They get into a little argument and Rob says that if the sketch is out, so are he, Buddy and Sally. Rob starts to leave, but Buddy and Sally stay. At home, Rob tells Laura that he quit and that Buddy and Sally betrayed him. Robs flashes back to when he first started on the show. Rob tells Mel that he's worried about being hired as the "head writer" when Buddy and Sally had been working there for some time. Things get awkward when Buddy and Sally learn Rob will be in charge. Buddy and Sally are very dismissive of sketch that Rob suggests. They start writing without Rob. Mel comes by after Buddy and Sally have left to tell Rob that Alan rejected the script. Alan was expecting something more original from Rob. Rob doesn't say that it was Buddy and Sally that wrote it. Rob submits the sketch he suggested earlier. The next day Mel tells Rob, Buddy and Sally that Alan loved the sketch. Buddy and Sally realize it wasn't their work. Rob has to tell them that Alan hated what they wrote. They learn that Rob put their names on the work as well and feel better about Rob. Back to the present, Rob tells Laura that he's hurt that Buddy and Sally didn't stand with him. The next morning, Mel comes by to apologize and wants Rob to come back to work. He also mentions that Buddy and Sally quit. Rob, Buddy and Sally all come back.
50	20	"It May Look Like a Walnut"	Jerry Paris	Carl Reiner	February 6, 1963	51
Rob is watching a scary sci-fi movie on TV. To try to avoid hearing it, Laura hides under her bed covers. After it's over, Rob describes the movie to her. Kolak, a visitor from the planet Twilo, is using walnuts filled with absorb-a-tron to steal Earthlings' thumbs and imaginations. Rob says that Kolak looked like Danny Thomas, but had two eyes in the front and two eyes in the back. Laura doesn't want to hear anymore about the film and turns off the light. But Rob keeps telling her about it. The next morning, there are walnuts all over the living room floor. Laura denies putting them there. Ritchie's lunch for school is a bag of walnuts. Laura is scrambling walnuts for Rob's breakfast, but he says he'll grab something at the office. Rob tells Buddy and Sally that Laura is getting even with him for scaring her last night. Sally says that Kolak is real and Buddy starts eating walnuts. Rob asks if Laura put them up to this. They tell Rob that Danny Thomas is the guest star this week. Mel comes by and mentions Kolak. Mel and Buddy are friendly to each other. Rob wonders if he's dreaming or is Laura having her revenge. Rob notices he still has his thumbs. He opens a walnut and there is a glowing orb in it. Kolak (Danny Thomas) comes in the office and tells Rob he is the last Earth person. Suddenly Rob's thumbs are gone and he heads home. Laura comes out of a closet full of walnuts and acts as though she's from Twilo. Rob wakes up from his nightmare. Note: In 1997, TV Guide ranked this episode number 15 on its list of the 100 Greatest Episodes. In 2009, it moved to No. 13. In 2021, a clip from this episode is also shown in the WandaVision episode "Previously On". Also in 2021, the first episode of Wandavision, "Filmed Before a Live Studio Audience", is a tribute to sitcoms of the 1950s and early 1960s, especially The Dick Van Dyke Show, to the point that Wandavison's producers talked to Dick Van Dyke himself for his advice to keep the episode as authentic as possible.)
51	21	"My Husband is a Check-Grabber"	Alan Rafkin	Carl Reiner	February 13, 1963	50
Rob and Laura are driving home from a night out and Laura is not speaking to Rob. Rob tries to guess what he did wrong. Laura says that it's terrible that they won't be able to send Ritchie to college. Rob recounts what happened at the restaurant. Rob and Laura join Buddy, Pickles (Joan Shawlee), Sally and Herman Glimscher (Bill Idelson). Sally introduces Herman to Laura and Rob. Anatole (Phil Arnold) takes their order. There is a discussion about living in the city versus the suburbs. Rob picks up the check and tips Anatole. Buddy and Herman were going to pay and say that tomorrow night will be on them. Back to the present, Rob realizes that Laura is mad about him picking up the check. Laura says that Buddy invited them. The others had dinner and Rob and Laura only had coffee. Rob and Laura have a little bit of an argument. The next morning Jerry comes by and asks Rob why Laura is mad at him. Rob says that Laura thinks he's trying to buy people's love and affection. Rob says he's going to continue to pick up checks. That night, Rob lets Buddy and Herman pick up the check. On the ride home, Laura gives Rob a kiss. Rob tells Laura that it was Ritchie that got him to change. Ritchie tried to get friends to play with him by giving them some of his stuff. Note: Bill Idelson makes his debut in the recurring role of Herman Glimscher, Sally's perennial boyfriend.
52	22	"Don't Trip Over That Mountain"	Coby Ruskin	Carl Reiner	February 20, 1963	52
Rob is looking forward to a skiing trip with Jerry. Laura doesn't mind Rob going, but Rob isn't sure she means it. Laura finally confesses that she's worried he will get hurt. Jerry is an expert skier and Robb has never skied before. Laura had a dream that Rob would severely injure himself. Her woman's intuition is always right. The weekend is over and the guys are late coming home. Millie tells Laura to not worry. Millie learns from her daughter Patty that Jerry tried calling and will call later. Meanwhile at the hospital, Jerry has his arm in a sling. He asks the Nurse (Jean Allison) how Rob is doing. She says the Doctor (Ray Kellogg) is checking on him right now. Jerry tells the Nurse that he, Rob and two other people were going down a slope and a goat caused a collision. While Jerry had a sprained wrist, it turns out Rob has a full-body sprain. Rob will try and hide it from Laura, otherwise he will never heard the end of it. Rob calls Laura and tells her everything is fine and they are late because of car trouble. Rob arrives home and says some things to get Laura mad at him so she won't hug him. Thinking she went to bed, Rob takes off his shirt to reveal all the bandages. Laura sees him and he explains what happened. Laura is sorry for him.
53	23	"Give Me Your Walls!"	Jerry Paris	Carl Reiner	February 27, 1963	53
Rob accidentally scribbles on the wall in the Petries' living room with an indelible marker. He manages to get the ink off, but also some of the paint. Laura comes home and thinks Ritchie did it, but Rob admits to it. Rob tries painting the wall, but runs out of paint. Rob decides to do what Laura suggested earlier and call a painter. They call Vito Giotto (Vito Scotti), a flamboyant Italian painter. Rob gives Vito the Job. Laura pulls Rob aside and says she thinks Vito is a nut. Rob didn't even ask what it would cost. Laura asks Vito for an estimate, but all she gets is flattery. Very early the next morning, Vito shows up to start painting. Rob goes back to bed. Later they learn that Vito made breakfast for Ritchie. Vito offers to make breakfast for Rob and Laura. It's been five days and Vito hasn't started painting the living room. He does manage to paint Ritchie's room and the basement. Rob says he'll get rid of Vito, he just doesn't know how. What they don't know is that Vito overheard all of this. The next morning the living room is done. Vito's bill is very small. He says it's because they made him feel so comfortable. Vito comes back days later and puts on a magic show for Ritchie and his friends.
54	24	"The Sam Pomerantz Scandals"	Claudio Guzmán	Carl Reiner	March 6, 1963	54
Rob and Laura talk Buddy, Mel and Sally into spending their week vacation at Rob's Army buddy Sam Pomerantz's (Henry Calvin) new resort. At the resort Rob introduces everyone to Sam. They then learn that comedian Danny Brewster (Lennie Weinrib, who appeared earlier as "Jackie Brewster") is appearing there. Danny comes by and does some impersonations for them. Later, Rob can't find anyone to play tennis with. Despite having just played a set and being tired, Danny agrees to play a little with Rob. Rob winds up hitting Danny in the mouth with a tennis play and Danny won't be able to perform. Rob tells Sam that he's sure he can get the others to entertain for his opening night. That night Sally sings a song. Buddy tells some jokes. Rob and Laura sing and dance. Rob and Sam impersonate Laurel and Hardy. Mel and Pickles are also in that sketch. Rob, Laura, Buddy and Sally sing a song. Songs: Rose sings "I Wanna Be Around". Dick and Mary sing "Carolina in the Morning". Dick, Mary, Morey and Rose sing "I Am a Fine Musician".
55	25	"The Square Triangle"	Jerry Paris	Bill Idelson	March 20, 1963	56
Mel tells Rob, Buddy and Sally that he got French singing star Jacques Savon (Jacques Bergerac) to be the guest on the show. Sally and Buddy can tell that Rob is not thrilled. Rob says that he and Laura met Jacques when they visited Europe years ago. Rob believes he broke up Jacques marriage to Yvette. Rob thinks that Yvette fell for him. Rob never told Laura, but he thinks she suspects. Just then Mel brings Jacques in the office and Rob hides behind a door. Jacques tells Buddy he needs to discuss something with Rob. Rob brings Sally and Buddy home for dinner. Laura learns about Jacques being on the show. Laura tells Millie that she doesn't want to see Jacques because she broke up his marriage. Laura believes that Jacques fell in love with her. They wind up telling Sally. The next day, Buddy and Sally find it interesting that Rob and Laura each think they broke up the marriage. When they mention it to Jacques, he says neither one were the cause. Jacques won't tell Laura and Rob the truth because he wants both to think they could attract someone else. Laura comes to the office and runs into Jacques. Rob then comes in the office Jacques finds way to make them both feel better without letting each other know their secret.
56	26	"I'm No Henry Walden!"	Jerry Paris	Story by : Ray Brenner & Jack Guss; Teleplay by : Carl Reiner	March 27, 1963	55
Rob and Laura are invited to an elegant dinner party for all the top writers in various fields, thrown by wealthy Mrs. Huntington (Doris Packer). Rob is concerned because he's not what he considers a serious writer. Rob and Laura really only want to meet famed poet Henry Walden (Everett Sloane). After arriving, Rob tells Laura they don't belong there. Mrs. Huntington introduces Rob and Laura to various people, but she keeps mispronouncing Petrie. Rob and Laura are very uncomfortable with the pretentious guests. It turns out the party is a fund-raiser for the Henry Walden Literary Foundation. Many of the guests donate either some or all of their earnings from published books. Rob is scratching his head and Mrs. Huntington thinks he wants to make a donation. Flustered, Rob pulls out a blank check. Before he can fill in an amount, everyone thanks him for his selfless generosity. Back at home, Rob believes he was mistaken for another writer. Rob's worried the check will bounce as there's practically no money in the account. That will certainly ruin his reputation. Rob would love to know who sent him the invitation. At the office, Rob tells Sally and Buddy what happened. Mel tells Rob that Henry Walden and Mrs. Huntington want to see him. It appears that Henry is familiar with the show and knows all about the writers. He has Mrs. Huntington return Rob's check. Henry was the one that got Rob invited because he wants to collaborate with him on writing a TV special. Roxane Berard as Miss Thomas Evelyn. Carl Reiner as Yale Sampson. Betty Lou Gerson as Mrs. Vonitia Fellows. Howard Wendell as Dr. Torrence Hayworth.
57	27	"Racy Tracy Rattigan"	Sheldon Leonard	Ronald Alexander and Carl Reiner	April 3, 1963	57
Rob tells Buddy and Sally that Alan is going on a two week vacation to Bermuda. British actor 'Racy' Tracy Rattigan (Richard Dawson) will be filling in as substitute host. Sally goes home to get all dolled up for Tracy. Because she's a fan of his, Rob calls Laura to tell her the news. Mel brings Tracy to the office. Tracy says he's never hosted a show before, but is looking forward to it. Laura stops by to meet Tracy and he is quite taken with her. Tracy does a comedy routine for them. Buddy and Sally head home. Tracy flirts a little with Laura. Tracy invites himself over to Rob's house under the pretense of working on the show. After Tracy leaves, Rob tells Laura he's not happy with the way Tracy was flirting. That night Tracy comes by the house and gives Laura a kiss on the cheek. Tracy suggests doing a sketch about dancing. He dances with Laura and keeps getting very close with her. Rob finally has to spray him with champagne to stop his flirtatious advances at Laura. Rob then kicks him out. The next day, Mel tells Rob he'll have to apologize to Tracy. Tracy comes to the office and tells everyone that last night was all a gag. He says he does it all the time and he apologizes to Rob. He also mentions that they'll never really know if he's telling the truth.
58	28	"Divorce"	Jerry Paris	Carl Reiner	April 10, 1963	58
Rob and Laura are watching TV. Rob gets a call from Buddy. Rob tells Laura that Buddy left Pickles and is getting a divorce. Buddy asked Rob to meet him at a bar. At the bar Rob gives the Bartender (Charlie Cantor) a description of Buddy. Rob spills some water on woman (Marian Collier) and tries to dry her off. A man (Arthur Batanides), obviously her husband, hits Rob. Buddy comes by and tells Rob that he found a bunch of canceled checks made out to a guy he believes is seeing Pickles. Rob gets home in the middle of the night. Rob tells Laura that he took Buddy to a hotel. He then tells her about the other guy. Sally calls and says that Pickles is trying to locate Buddy. Sally tells Rob to call Pickles. Rob calls Buddy at the hotel and learns that Pickles was married before. Rob gets a call from Pickles, in hysterics over Buddy not coming home. She insists Rob come over, which he reluctantly does. He hears her side of the story. Buddy always knew about her previous marriage. The checks were because she was being blackmailed by her first husband because he was a forger and wound up in jail. Just at the very moment when Rob tries to comfort her, Buddy comes home. Not knowing it was Rob, Buddy hits him. Buddy and Pickles work things out. Sheldon Leonard as Floyd B. Bariscale (voice). Jerry Paris as Mr. Thompson on TV (voice). Carl Reiner as TV Defense Lawyer (voice).
59	29	"It's a Shame She Married Me"	James Niver	Sheldon Keller and Howard Merrill	April 17, 1963	59
Rob and Laura hear from their accountant Sidney that they'll have to cut back on their spending for a little while. Despite making a good living, Rob feels like a failure. The next day at the office, Mel comes in and says the show's new sponsor is here to meet them. Mel says his name is Jim Darling (Robert Vaughn). That name rings a bell with Rob. Jim comes in and recognizes Rob. Turns out that Jim knew Laura back in the day and he was quite fond of her. Jim invites them all to his penthouse the following evening for cocktails. Jim insists that Rob bring Laura. After Jim leaves, Rob tells Buddy and Sally that he won't tell Laura about the cocktail party. Back at home, Laura tells Rob that they are to play bridge with Jerry and Millie tomorrow night. Sally calls and Laura learns about Jim. Laura says she'd like to see Jim. Rob calls Jim and tells him they won't be able to make his party as Ritchie is sick. Rob slips up and now Jim will bring the whole party to Rob's house. The night of the party Laura has on a very sexy dress. Everyone arrives and Laura and Jim hit it off very well. Jim makes a great impression with his talk of travel and wealth. Rob embarrasses himself trying to compete. Jim mentions he'd get married if he could find someone like Laura. After everyone leaves, Rob asks Laura why she didn't stop him from acting like a fool.
60	30	"A Surprise Surprise is a Surprise"	Jerry Paris	Carl Reiner	April 24, 1963	60
Rob overhears Laura talking to Millie about some secret. Laura talks about deceiving Rob and asks Millie to keep it a secret. To Rob it sounds like Laura is planning on having an affair. The next morning Laura calls Millie and says that she thinks Rob suspects something because he's been acting strangely. Laura wishes she could stop but she's gone to far already. Rob also overhears this. Rob feels a little silly when Laura mentions the surprise birthday party she's throwing for him. Ritchie mentions Rob's birthday is coming up. Rob asks Laura if she has anything planned and she is being evasive. Rob pretends to leave for work. He then hears Laura call Millie and says that she suspects that Rob knows about the party. Rob doesn't know it, but Laura sees him. At the office, Sally tells Buddy that Laura is going to call and pretend she's just having a dinner for Rob's birthday. Rob arrives and tells them he knows about the surprise party. Laura does call and Rob thinks she's just doing the old double reverse on him. It's the morning of Rob's birthday. Rob overhears Laura talking to Sally on the phone. Sally says she isn't feeling well and won't make the party. Laura starts crying and tells Rob that the surprise party fell through and they'll just have a dinner party. Suddenly everyone shows up for a morning pajama birthday surprise party.
61	31	"Jilting the Jilter"	Jerry Paris	Ronald Alexander	May 1, 1963	61
At the office, Rob tells Buddy that he, Laura and Sally went out for dinner last night. They ran into Freddy White (Guy Marks), a deadbeat comedian. Rob and Buddy reminisce about how they have both provided material to Freddy but were never paid. Rob says that Freddy was really complimenting Sally. Rob and Laura let Freddy take Sally home and Rob thinks that Sally will be mad about it. Rob and Buddy are stunned to learn that Sally really likes Freddy and she hopes to marry him someday. That night, Rob tells Laura that Freddy is only romancing Sally to get her to write him some new material for free. Rob wants to split Sally and Freddy up, but Laura thinks Sally will resent him for it. Sally and Freddy stop by. Freddy flirts with Sally and jokes about her writing new material for him. When the women go to get some coffee, Freddy admits to Rob that he hopes to marry Sally and get free material for life. At the office, Sally says that her and Freddy will get married. She also knows that Freddy never paid Rob and Buddy. Sally says she knows what she's doing and she thinks she can help Freddy. Rob tells Buddy that if they write Freddy a great act, he'll forget about Sally. Rob and Laura host a party and Freddy does his new routine. Mel offers him a spot on the show, but Freddy turns him down. Freddy wants to take the new act on the road and make a lot of money. Rob's plan doesn't pan out as Freddy says that will be a wedding gift. The next day Freddy does reveal something to Sally that makes her say goodbye.
62	32	"When a Bowling Pin Talks, Listen"	Jerry Paris	Martin Ragaway	May 8, 1963	62
Ritchie is watching The Uncle Spunky Show on TV. Rob comes home exhausted. He tells Laura that he, Buddy and Sally worked all day trying to come up with a comedy sketch for the show with no success. Ritchie tells Rob about a talking bowling pin. The next day, Buddy and Sally are still trying to come up with something funny. Rob comes by and tells them about the talking bowling pin and starts doing a skit. Buddy and Sally love the idea and they give a sketch to Mel. Willie the Deli Man (Herbie Faye) comes to the office. Mel comes back and tells them he loved the sketch and sent it to Alan. When Mel mentions a talking bowling pin, Willie says that bit was done on The Uncle Spunky Show. Buddy asks Rob if he stole the idea and Rob says he got it from Ritchie. Sally says that Uncle Spunky has no problem suing people. They learn that Alan loved the sketch. Rob tells Mel that they unknowingly stole the idea. Mel, Rob, Buddy and Sally go to see Alan and tell him the sketch is stolen. Mel suggests that Alan call Uncle Spunky and offer to buy the material from him. Instead, Alan tells Uncle Spunky that he's been doing the sketch for years, but he won't sue. Song: Carl Reiner sings "Beautiful Dreamer".

=== Season 3 (1963–1964) ===
- Season 3 of The Dick Van Dyke Show consisted of 32 black-and-white half-hour episodes.

No. overall	No. in season	Title	Directed by	Written by	Original release date	Prod. code
63	1	"That's My Boy??"	John Rich	Bill Persky and Sam Denoff	September 25, 1963	64
Mel, Jerry and Millie are visiting Rob and Laura. Mel mentions that his wife's sister just had a baby girl. He says that considering how unattractive the mother and father are, it's amazing that the baby turned out so beautiful. Mel jokes that the hospital may have given them the wrong baby. The others force Rob to tell how he thought he and Laura were given the wrong baby. Flashback to when Rob and Jerry go to pick up Laura and Ritchie from the hospital. The nurse (Amzie Strickland) gives Laura the baby. The staff kept mistaking Laura's room (208) with a Mrs. Peters (203), who also had a baby boy on the same day. Back at home Rob wonders who the baby resembles. Millie says that the baby doesn't look like either him nor Laura. Sally and Buddy come by. Rob tells Jerry he thinks they got the wrong baby. Something Laura says convinces Rob there was a mix-up. Jerry suggests comparing the baby's footprints against the records. The footprints match, but then they discover they have the Peters' records. Rob talks to Mr. Peters (Greg Morris) on the phone and says the babies have been switched. Mr. Peters agrees to come by. Rob finally tells Laura he thinks they have the wrong baby. The Peters arrive and Rob is now convinced they have the right baby. The Peters have a big laugh about it. Note: This episode was colorized and shown on CBS-TV on December 11, 2016.)
64	2	"The Masterpiece"	John Rich	Sam Denoff and Bill Persky	October 2, 1963	65
Rob, Laura, Buddy and Sally are at an estate sale auction. They are doing research for a sketch. Laura finds an odd object that she really wants. Rob thinks they can use it in the sketch. They hear a woman (Amzie Strickland) and a man named John (Ray Kellogg) say they want to bid on it. The Auctioneer (Alan Reed, the voice of Fred Flintstone) starts the proceedings. The object Laura wants goes up for bid. Laura gets Rob to bid more than he wanted to and they win. Rob, Buddy, and Sally accidentally bid on a painting of a clown signed by "Artanis". At the end, the Auctioneer gives Rob a card for art expert Mr. Ernest Holdecker (Howard Morris). Holdecker may buy the painting from Rob. At home Rob and Laura discover that another, original painting is hidden underneath that of the clown. It bears a striking similarity to the Grant Wood masterpiece American Gothic. Buddy and Sally come by and then Holdecker arrives. Holdecker concludes it is not a Grant Wood painting. It turns out that the painting of the clown was by Frank Sinatra, who used Artanis as a pseudonym.
65	3	"Laura's Little Lie"	John Rich	Carl Reiner and Howard Merrill	October 9, 1963	66
Rob gets a call from his insurance agent Ed Rubin (Charles Aidman). Ed would like to discuss something and Rob invites him over. Rob notices that everytime he mentions Ed, Laura gets uncomfortable. Before Ed shows up, Laura sneaks out of the house. Ed arrives and Rob discovers that Laura is gone. Ed says that Laura never signed the policy they went over last month. It's very late and Laura finally comes home. Rob says he's been calling everyone trying to find her. Laura claims she went to a movie. Rob gives her the forms she needs to sign and she needs to make a doctor's appointment. The next morning Ed calls and Rob looks for Laura, but she snuck out again. At the office, Rob tells Buddy and Sally about Laura acting strangely. They figure out that for some reason Laura is afraid to see Ed. Rob wonders if she doesn't want to see the doctor for some reason. Rob calls Laura and she is still evasive. At home Laura is forced to confess to Rob that she lied about her age on their marriage certificate. She was 17 instead of the 19 that she claimed to be. Rob calls Marvin, his lawyer, who says they are probably not legally married and should remarry. Note: Part 1 of 2.
66	4	"Very Old Shoes, Very Old Rice"	John Rich	Carl Reiner	October 16, 1963	67
Laura models a new outfit for Millie and Millie thinks it's beautiful. Laura wishes she could say what the occasion the outfit is for, but she can't. Millie guesses a wedding. Laura tells Millie that her and Rob are getting married again and Millie has to promise not to say anything. At the office, Buddy and Sally are trying to find out why Rob won't be in the next day, but he won't say anything. Mel comes by and tells Rob there's a staff meeting the next morning. Rob says he can make it in the afternoon. The next morning Rob tells Laura he can't take the whole day off. Laura is a little disappointed. Something Laura says makes Rob suspect she told someone. They get into an argument and it comes out that Laura told Millie. At the out of town Justice of the Peace office, Judge Krata (Russell Collins) is speaking with wedding witnesses Donald (Burt Mustin) and Dodo Parker (Madge Blake). Donald goes to show Rob and Laura in, but they are arguing. The Parkers tell Rob and Laura how they met and that they've been married five years. Rob and Laura are still a little hostile to each other. The Judge refuses to marry them. Something Rob says makes Laura very happy and the Judge can see they really do love each other. Note: Part 2 of 2.
67	5	"All About Eavesdropping"	Stanley Cherry	Sheldon Keller and Howard Merrill	October 23, 1963	63
Rob is waiting for Laura to get ready so they can go over to Millie and Jerry's house for a dinner party. Buddy and Sally will be there as well. Rob finds Ritchie's toy intercom and it's hooked up to Freddy Helper's one. Rob eavesdrops on a private conversation between Jerry and Millie. Laura doesn't think Rob should be doing it. Millie makes a derogatory comment about a recipe of Laura's. Millie and Jerry make more unpleasant remarks about Laura and Rob. Jerry, Millie, Buddy and Sally wonder what's taking Rob and Laura so long. After a call from Jerry, Rob and Laura come over. The others can tell something is wrong. Buddy and Sally try to cheer things up, but Rob and Laura are still very distant. Laura reluctantly plays a game of Charades. Later after Rob and Laura leave, the others wonder what happened. At home, Rob and Laura turn the intercom back on and hear Jerry say he won't forgive them for ruining the party. But after something Millie says, Jerry has nothing but nice things to say about them. Despite it being very late, Rob and Laura go back to Jerry's house. They let Jerry and Millie know that they were eavesdropping and feel bad about it. The four get back together and are still friends. Songs: Rose and Morey sing "Go Tell Aunt Rhody".
68	6	"Too Many Stars"	Jerry Paris	Sheldon Keller and Howard Merrill	October 30, 1963	69
Rob has been avoiding Mrs. Billings (Eleanor Audley) because he's sure she'll want him to once again direct the annual PTA variety show. She shows up at the office. Mrs. Billings tells Rob she's sorry but someone else has been chosen and she leaves. Rob is thrilled. Rob tells Buddy and Sally that he doesn't mind directing the show, it's the auditions that put him in an awkward position. Mrs. Billings comes back and says she'll find a way for Rob to be the director. At home, a Delivery Man (Jerry Hausner) brings by a lot of refreshments and asks Laura what time the auditions are. Rob learns that Laura told Mrs. Billings where he works. He knows that Laura hopes to get the lead role, as usual. Rob tells her that Buddy and Sally have a musical comedy for him. They wrote it for Alan, but every year he rejects it. It's time for the auditions. Rob must choose between Laura and Anita Lebost (Sylvia Lewis), a very talented newcomer to the neighborhood. Afterwards, Laura asks Rob who he's going to pick and he tells her she'll find out when everyone else does. Rob comes up with a compromise by having both Laura and Anita play the lead. Eddie Ryder as Howard Lebost. Songs: Ann Morgan Guilbert sings "A Sentimental Love Song" aka "My Heart Got a Smash in the Face". Sylvia Lewis sings "Cielito Lindo". Sylvia Lewis, Mary and Dick sing "A Doodlin' Song".
69	7	"Who and Where Was Antonio Stradivarius?"	Jerry Paris	Carl Reiner	November 6, 1963	70
Laura is expecting her Uncle Edward (Harold Peary) and Aunt Mildred (Amzie Strickland) very soon. She calls Rob because he's late. He tells her they have to finish the sketch they are working on. Rob and Buddy run through the sketch and Rob smashes what he thinks is a breakaway violin over his head. Sally learns that it was a real violin. Mel tells Rob that Alan would like him to bring the script to his penthouse. Rob starts acting funny and is forgetting things. Back at home, it's time for Edward and Mildred to leave. It's getting very late and Laura calls Millie. She says she did some checking around and found out that Rob never made it to Alan's place. It turns out Rob has a bout of temporary amnesia. He winds up dancing with Graciella, a blonde at a party in Red Hook, New Jersey. Rob thinks his name is Antonio Stradivarius. Rob's memory suddenly comes back. Graciella kisses him goodbye and Rob leaves. Laura is very worried and has Buddy and Sally come over. Buddy jokes about temporary amnesia. Rob comes home and Buddy and Sally leave. Rob tries to tell Laura he really had temporary amnesia and wound up in Red Hook. Laura has a hard time believing him and notices lipstick on his collar. The next morning Graciella comes to the house. Rob is stunned when Laura now believes him because of something that Graciella said. Betty Lou Gerson as Party Hostess.
70	8	"Uncle George"	Jerry Paris	Bill Idelson	November 13, 1963	68
Rob's boisterous Uncle George (Denver Pyle) comes for a visit. George asks Rob to help him find a wife. Because Rob is in show business, George assumes he knows a lot of women. At the office Rob asks Buddy and Sally where he can find a nice elderly lady for George. Sally comes up with the idea of her boyfriend Herman Glimscher's (Bill Idelson) mother (Elvia Allman). Rob sets up a dinner party for that night. Laura forgot to pick up the dessert. George volunteers to go get it. Meanwhile, Sally, Herman and Mrs. Glimscher arrive. Mrs. Glimscher is a little car sick and needs her pills. She mentions how she likes being around younger people. Rob, Laura and Sally tell Herman the reason for the party. George bursts into the room and is immediately taken with Sally. Rob takes George into the kitchen and tries to explain that Sally is with Herman. Herman tells Rob that the evening has been too much for his Mother and he'll be taking her and Sally home. George wants to take Sally home and Rob says he'll go with. Laura reminds them they never ate dinner. It's very late after they drop Sally off because they went dancing. George overhears Rob tell Laura what a fool George made of himself and Sally wants nothing to do with him. George finds a way to save face and get Sally off the hook. Song: Denver Pyle sings "Buffalo Gals".
71	9	"Big Max Calvada"	Jerry Paris	Bill Persky and Sam Denoff	November 20, 1963	71
At the office, Sally gets a call saying Maxwell Calvada (series producer Sheldon Leonard) wants to see Rob. It takes a minute, but Buddy, Sally and Rob realize Max is an infamous mobster. Max enters the office with his associate Bernard (Arthur Batanides). Turns out Max would like them to write material for his nephew Kenny Dexter (Larrs Jackson, credited under his early stage name, Jack Larson). Kenny aspires to be a comic. They are afraid to refuse because of Calvada's reputation. At home, Laura thinks Rob should have just turned down Max. Rob says that Max mentioned her and Ritchie. The next day at the office, they all hope that Kenny has some talent. Kenny arrives, starts doing a routine and it's not very good. Max and Bernard show up. Max tells them that he's already booked Kenny in a very popular night club. They have two weeks to get Kenny ready. They come up with a lot of good material. It's the night of the opening. Rob, Laura, Buddy and Sally are sitting with Max and his wife Clarisse (Sue Casey). Kenny is a flop and by the end of his act everyone else has left. Max arranges for Laura to be taken home so he can talk to the others. Turns out Max hired them to prove to Kenny that he has no talent. Max wants Kenny to give up comedy and go to college. Johnny Silver as Waiter. Tiny Brauer as Mr. Parker. Song: Larrs Jackson sings "(I'd Love to Hear You Say) Encore".
72	10	"The Ballad of the Betty Lou"	Howard Morris	Martin Ragaway	November 27, 1963	72
Rob, Laura, Jerry and Millie come back from an outing on Alan Brady's yacht. Rob and Jerry had a great time. The wives are glad it's only once a year. Jerry is an experienced sailor, while Rob knows nothing about boats. Rob thinks that he and Jerry should buy a boat together. The wives are completely against it, thinking it will ruin their friendship. Later, Rob shows Jerry the captain's uniform he bought. They disagree on a name for the boat. Right now the boat they'll be looking at is named the Betty Lou. Later, Rob practices making sailor's knots, but isn't doing well. It's the morning that Rob is going to see the boat and Laura is still not happy. It's the evening and Laura and Millie are getting worried. Laura calls the Coast Guard and she learns that it was rough and foggy out on the water. The Coast Guard calls back and says they found Rob and Jerry. At the station, Rob and Jerry are soaking wet and they are angry with each other. Jerry rammed a canoe with two women in it and he had to rescue them. Jerry blames Rob. When they drop their anchor, they cut a power cable. They wind up sinking the boat. Laura and Millie arrive and learn about all the things that went wrong. Laura finally says "I told you so".
73	11	"Turtles, Ties and Toreadors"	Jerry Paris	John Whedon	December 4, 1963	73
Rob wants to give Laura a rest from housework and hire a maid. Laura jokes that she is on the bottom of the list of every agency in the county. Rob tells her he actually hired a maid and she'll be here later today. Laura is upset because the house is a mess. Later, the Taxi Driver (Tiny Brauer) drops off the woman. Rob ends up with Maria (Míriam Colón), a woman fresh from Barcelona who speaks no English, has a broken arm, and expects to work as a live-in. Rob has a hard time communicating with Maria as he speaks very little Spanish. Laura can't believe it when she finds this out. Rob and Laura agree that she can't stay, but neither wants to be the one to fire her. The next morning Maria tries to help, but it isn't going well. Rob calls the agency and learns that Maria will be deported if they fire her. They reluctantly agree to keep her until the agency can find her another job. Things do not go well and they decide Maria has to go and they call the agency again. Maria starts crying when she learns she will be sent back. Rob discovers she has a talent for artistic painting. The Immigration Officer (Alan Dexter) comes to get Maria. Rob tells the Officer that he knows a Novelty Shop where Maria can get a job doing her painting.
74	12	"The Sound of the Trumpets of Conscience Falls Deafly on a Brain That Holds Its Ears..."	Jerry Paris	Bill Persky and Sam Denoff	December 11, 1963	74
At the office Buddy tells Sally that a man and woman held up a jewelry store in broad daylight. Sally thinks it's a joke and is waiting for the punch line. Buddy tells her it really happened. Rob comes in and says that while he was in the parking lot a man and woman ran by and knocked him over. Buddy tells him about the robbery. Something both Buddy and Sally say makes Rob second guess calling the police. Rob calls Laura and tells her what happened and she tells him to be careful. Rob goes to the Police Station. He is frightened when a Police Officer (Ray Kellogg) brings in a Hoodlum (Alan Dexter). Rob speaks to Patrolman Nelson (Bernie Hamilton), who goes to get Lt. Yarnell (Ken Lynch). Some things that Nelson says makes Rob want to leave, but then Yarnell shows up. Rob tries to describe the crooks, but isn't doing too well. Yarnell would like Rob to look at some people in a line up. Rob then sees the Hoodlum from earlier threaten a witness. Back at home, Rob tells Laura that none of the suspects the police had were the ones he saw. Rob is glad he came up with the courage, he just wishes he was more helpful. Just then Rob remembers that the crooks got into a red Edsel. Rob wants to call the police, but Laura tries to talk him out of it, unsuccessfully. Rob tries to explain to Ritchie the difference between a witness and a snitch. Rob and Laura go back to the police station. It turns out the man that knocked Rob down was a witness running away. He gave a good description of the actual crooks. The woman the witness was with wasn't his wife.
75	13	"The Alan Brady Show Presents"	Jerry Paris	Sam Denoff and Bill Persky	December 18, 1963	76
Alan's annual Christmas show is airing. Alan is dressed as Santa and he brings out Rob. A nervous Rob will explain why this show will be different than past Christmas shows. Flashback to a week ago. Rob, Buddy and Sally have written a very funny Christmas show. Laura comes by the office loaded down with gifts she bought. Mel says that Alan loved the script, but he won't use it. Alan has had many critics say that what his Christmas shows lack is heart. To change that, Alan wants his staff and their families to perform. Laura loves the idea. Back to the present. Rob, Mel, Laura, Sally and Buddy sing "Alan Brady". Sally sings "Santa, Send a Fella". A giant package is brought on stage and Sally hopes it's a fellow. She opens it and it's Buddy with his cello. Buddy tries to perform "Jingle Bells", but Sally interrupts him. Rob and Laura are dressed as Santas collecting donations. They sing "I Have Everything But You" and they dance. Ritchie sings "The Little Drummer Boy". Rob, Laura, Sally and Buddy sing "I Am a Fine Musician". Note: Carl Reiner appears as Alan Brady, but as was the custom at this juncture of the series, his face is not seen, but is instead hidden behind an outsized Santa Claus beard.
76	14	"The Third One from the Left"	Jerry Paris	John Whedon	January 1, 1964	75
Mel is upset with Rob because he let 18 year old chorus girl Joan Delroy (Cheryl Holdridge) have a featured role on the show. Mel says it's his job to find the talent. As Buddy and Sally are about to go home, Joan comes in the office and thanks everyone. Buddy and Sally leave. Just as Laura comes by, Joan hugs and kisses Rob. At home, Rob tries to downplay the whole thing, but Laura says Joan's in love with him. Rob tells Laura she's jealous. Laura tells Rob he needs to put a stop to it. At the office, Joan comes by to thank Rob again. He tries to tell her there can't be a relationship between them. Mel comes by and sees Joan kiss Rob. Laura suggests to Rob that he chase Joan and that will scare her away. At the office, Rob tells Joan they need to fly to Mexico. He can get a divorce from Laura and they can get married there. At first Joan backs away from Rob and says she has a boyfriend named Ernie Murphy. The plan backfires when Joan calls Ernie and tells him she said yes to Rob's proposal. Ernie comes by the office and punches Rob in the stomach. When Joan finds out how Ernie really feels, she forgets about Rob.
77	15	"My Husband Is the Best One"	Jerry Paris	Martin Ragaway	January 8, 1964	77
At the office, Mell tells Rob that Newstime magazine is doing a cover story on Alan. They want to know what the writers think of Alan. Mel would like Rob to take the reporter, Diane Moseby, to lunch. Rob was to meet Laura for lunch. Mel says that Laura can join him and Diane. At lunch, Rob tries to really talk up Alan's talent to Diane. Laura shows up and sings Rob's praises. This results in Rob getting most of the credit for the comic success of the show. In Alan's office, Rob reads the article. Alan is furious. Rob blames both Laura and himself for the article's tone. Buddy and Sally are not happy as they are only mentioned once and Diane got their names wrong. At home, Laura loves the article. Rob tells her it's all her fault. But he also admits to thinking most of what she said is true. Rob must figure out a way to make it up to Alan, Buddy, and Sally. Rob writes a letter to the editor of the magazine hoping to straighten things out. Buddy and Sally see the letter and apologize to Rob. Alan wants to place the letter as an ad in the magazine. But Rob's plan to set things straight backfires. Note: Although he is still shot only from behind, this episode represents the first time Carl Reiner has a significant amount of dialog in the role of Alan Brady.
78	16	"The Lady and the Tiger and the Lawyer"	Jerry Paris	Garry Marshall and Jerry Belson	January 15, 1964	79
Rob comes home from work and Laura introduces him to Arthur Stanwyck (Anthony Eisley), their new neighbor. Arthur is a bachelor and a lawyer. Later, Laura suggests setting Arthur up with her cousin, Donna Palmer. Rob thinks Sally may be a better match. Laura suggests having two dinner parties. One with Sally and the other with Donna. The first dinner is with Donna, who is a psychologist. Donna is also a bit clumsy. Donna and Arthur do have a lot in common. That thrills Laura, but annoys Rob. Afterwards, Rob wonders if he should cancel the dinner with Sally. During the dinner with Sally, her and Arthur get along very well. Rob and Laura have no idea who makes the better match because they are two extremely different women. Later, they wonder why Arthur hasn't called one of them. Arthur comes by with a gift for Rob and Laura. Arthur mentions that he has a date with his ex-wife. He married her twice and also had another wife. Arthur says he's seeing a psychiatrist because he has a temper and can wind up hitting people. He doesn't want to see anyone too often until he's cured.
79	17	"The Life and Love of Joe Coogan"	Jerry Paris	Carl Reiner	January 22, 1964	80
Rob, Buddy and Mel were out golfing. A man named Joe Coogan (Michael Forest), whom they met at the club, winds up being their fourth. After Buddy and Mel leave, Rob and Joe have a chat. Rob is surprised that handsome bachelor Joe never married. Joe says he's only been in love once. It was in college and the girl's name was Laura. Rob realizes that it's his Laura, but doesn't say anything. At home, Rob confronts Laura about Joe. Laura admits that she's secretly kept some mementos of her relationship with Joe, namely love Sonnets he wrote to her. Rob is obviously hurt and jealous. Laura tells Millie she was wrong to keep the Sonnets after she married Rob. Laura wonders why she didn't keep mementos from other boyfriends. Millie talks Laura into going to the golf club to see Joe. They discover he is a priest. Without mentioning Rob, Laura invites Joe to dinner that evening. Laura phones Rob to let him know she invited Joe to dinner. Not knowing Joe is a priest, Rob invites Sally to join them and snatch Joe away from Laura once and for all. That night Rob comes home and he discovers Joe is a priest. Things get a little awkward when Sally arrives and sees Joe is a priest. Later, Laura tells Rob that after reading the Sonnets again, she realizes they weren't to her, they were to God. Johnny Silver as Waiter.
80	18	"A Nice, Friendly Game of Cards"	Howard Morris	Ernest Chambers	January 29, 1964	81
Rob and Laura have Jerry, Millie and Buddy over and were playing poker. They also have over some new neighbors, a former District Attorney named Lou Gregory (Edward Platt) and his wife Beth (Shirley Mitchell). Just as Sally arrives, Lou and Beth storm out of the house. Sally asks what happened. Jerry says that Lou accused Rob of cheating with a set of marked cards. Rob explains what happened. Flashback to before the guests arriving. Rob is showing Ritchie some magic tricks including a card trick with a marked deck. Later, the guests arrive and Jerry suggests playing poker. Laura accidentally damages one of the cards. She gets a replacement deck, not realizing it's the marked deck that Rob was using earlier. Rob is on a winning streak. They are playing the last hand and Ritchie comes by. Something Ritchie says makes Rob realize that the cards are marked and that he has been subconsciously reading them. In the kitchen, Rob tells Jerry about the marked deck. Rob is going to try and lose the last hand. Rob slips up and it's revealed the cards are marked. Back to the present, Lou and Beth come back because he claims he took the wrong coat. Things get straightened out and Lou wants to keep playing but with his cards.
81	19	"Happy Birthday and Too Many More"	Jerry Paris	Bill Persky and Sam Denoff	February 5, 1964	78
Laura is trying to figure out when to have Ritchie's birthday party. It would have to be either three weeks before or three weeks after his actual birthday. Rob is surprised when Laura says that there will be 63 kids invited. Laura wants to hold Ritchie's party at Dizzyland amusement park. It would cost $2 per child. Laura says that kid's birthday parties have recently become extravagant affairs, it's the thing to do. At the office, Rob tells Sally and Buddy about the over the top party. The three agree that it's ridiculous to have a party like that. Rob calls Laura and says there will be no amusement park and no 63 kids. That night Ritchie tells his parents he's already invited all the kids. They'll have the party at the house. Rob tells Laura that he will get Buddy, Sally, Jerry and Millie to help entertain. It's the day of the party and they plan to hold it in the backyard. Sally and Buddy show up. Laura tells them that Jerry and Millie are sick and won't make it. The gardener fertilized and they can't use the yard. The children proceed to run wild and make a mess of the house. Rob tells the kids he's sending them home. Laura reminds Rob of his own belief that parents should give of themselves to their kids. Rob comes up with some entertainment as Robbo the Clown. After the party a Delivery Man (Johnny Silver) brings a pony that Alan rented. Songs: Rose and Morey sing "Old MacDonald Had a Farm". Dick sings "The Clown Song".
82	20	"The Brave and the Backache"	Jerry Paris	Sheldon Keller and Howard Merrill	February 12, 1964	82
Millie tells Laura that she and Jerry are going to a dentist's convention in Atlantic City. Millie did have plans to go to her sister's cottage at Lake Sissy Manoonoo for the weekend. Millie says she'd offer the cottage to Laura and Rob, but every time she does Rob gets sick and can't go. Jerry thinks Rob has some psychological block in going there. He thinks Rob is afraid to be alone with Laura. Jerry has a psychiatrist friend, Dr. Phil Nevins (Ross Elliott), that he rides the train with. Laura asks Rob if he'd like to go to the cottage, but he says he can't get away from work. Rob finally agrees to go just to prove he wants to be alone with Laura. At the office, Sally is coming down with a cold. Rob explains why he can't risk getting sick. While avoiding a sneeze from Sally, Rob throws out his back and can't straighten up. Sally sends for Tony Daniels (Ken Berry), a dance choreographer, to possibly help Rob. Tony finds a way to straighten Rob, but now he can't bend. At home, Rob tries to assure Laura that his back was an accident. Rob talks to Dr. Nevins. It turns out that as a child Rob went to a camp by a lake. There was a bully there and he made Rob feel like a sissy. Dr. Nevins believes that had nothing to do with Rob's back. He thinks it's just a coincidence.
83	21	"The Pen Is Mightier Than the Mouth"	Jerry Paris	Bill Persky and Sam Denoff	February 19, 1964	83
Laura wants to sleep, but Rob wants her to watch The Stevie Parsons Show. Laura is now interested when she learns Sally will be on the show. Rob says that they neglected writing for Alan because they wrote jokes for Sally. The next day at the office, Sally tells Rob and Buddy that she was such a hit that Stevie wants her back on the show tonight. Sally begs them to right more jokes for her and cover for her today. That night Stevie asks Sally to be a regular on the show. It's been days and without Sally as a buffer, Rob and Buddy start to get on each other's nerves. Mel wants a script and Rob and Buddy are having a hard time writing one. Rob and Buddy are surprised and thrilled when Sally comes back wanting to work. Bernie Quinn (Herb Vigran), a photographer from Women's Week magazine, comes by. He takes some pictures and then takes Sally away to take pictures elsewhere. Rob tells Buddy that he's going to fire Sally tomorrow. The next day Rob decides he needs to give Sally an ultimatum. Sally beats him to the punch with her own news about her long-term future. She will stay with the Parson's show for now and she got a leave of absence from Alan. At home Rob tells Laura that they'll have to hire a secretary temporarily. Rob said that Alan joked that they should use Laura. Laura wants to do it. Johnny Silver as Dave. Note: Part 1 of 2
84	22	"My Part-Time Wife"	Jerry Paris	Bill Persky and Sam Denoff	February 26, 1964	84
Sally is still appearing on The Stevie Parsons Show. Laura is practicing her typing. Millie doesn't understand why because Rob will never let her work at the office. Laura says that Rob has gone through four girls so far. Rob comes home and says another girl didn't work out. Laura hints at being ready to help him. Rob says that they hired Alan's niece Jackie (Jackie Joseph). The next day at the office, all Jackie can do is giggle. Sally comes by and says she thinks she has the perfect girl. Sally hands Rob the phone and it turns out to be Laura. Sally will know how permanent the Parsons show will be in a week. Rob reluctantly agrees to let Laura fill in for the week. Laura is going a great job at the office. It starts to annoy Rob that Laura can do the secretarial job very well and still maintain the house. Buddy is tired of Rob constantly ridiculing Laura's suggestions. Rob says something that really hurts Laura and she leaves. Back at home, Rob tells Laura that he's afraid she'll want to keep working because it was so easy. She tells him it was the hardest week of her life. The next day, Buddy tells Rob that Sally and Parsons had a falling out on the show. Sally arrives and says she's coming back. Note: Part 2 of 2
85	23	"Honeymoons Are for the Lucky"	Jerry Paris	Carl Reiner	March 4, 1964	85
Buddy and Sally come to the office to find Rob dictating into a tape recorder. Rob says that his honeymoon was disappointing. Turns out Rob is writing his memoirs. Rob tells them that he was almost court-martialed for going on his honeymoon. All the passes on the camp were cancelled the day he was to go on the honeymoon. Flashback to that day. Rob goes to see Captain Lebost (Peter Hobbs). Lebost says that until the man that broke into the Officer's Mess and stole some cooking sherry comes forward, no passes. Rob tells Laura, Millie and his Army buddy Sam Pomeroy (Allan Melvin) the bad news. Rob tells Laura to go to the Lake View Lodge and he'll meet her there. Rob dresses as a woman and sneaks off the base. Once at the Lodge, Rob finds Laura dealing with a shabby room and it's cranky owner, Mrs. Campbell (Kathleen Freeman). Sam comes to get him because of a surprise bed check. He has a half hour to get back. Back at the base, Rob learns that he will get his three day pass after all. They caught the guy that stole the wine. Lebost did suspect that Rob left the base. Rob goes back to the Lodge and is surprised to find Mrs. Campbell in the bed. Laura went to another room. Johnny Silver as Alfred Campbell.
86	24	"How to Spank a Star"	Jerry Paris	Nathaniel Curtis and Bill Idelson	March 11, 1964	86
At the office, Rob mentions that this weeks guest star is Paula Marshall (Lola Albright). Mel comes in and says for the past two days he and Paula have been at each others throats. Paula arrives and tells Rob she loves the script, but won't be able to do the show. She can't work with Mel and arranges it with Alan to have Rob produce the show. At home, Laura is not happy to hear that Paula is the guest star. She tells Rob she's had a horrible day. When Rob tells Laura that Paula made him the producer, Laura isn't happy that Rob will spend a lot of time with her. Rob lets it slip that Paula modeled all the clothes she is going to wear for the show. It's not long before Paula has Rob bending over backwards to fulfill her every whim. Sally and Buddy learn that Paula wants a lot of changes to the script. Rob starts to believe that Paula's suggestions are going to be bad for the show. Paula still manipulates Rob into doing what she wants. The way Laura stops a disobedient Ritchie gives Rob an idea how to handle Paula. Rob tells Paula they are going to do the script the way it was originally written. Paula caves in when Rob threatens to go to the legal department.
87	25	"The Plots Thicken"	Jerry Paris	Carl Reiner, Bill Persky and Sam Denoff	March 18, 1964	87
Rob's parents, Sam (J. Pat O'Malley) and Clara Petrie (Isabel Randolph), are over for dinner. Sam makes a toast and informs Rob and Laura that he bought adjoining cemetery plots for the four of them. Laura is a little uncomfortable. After the parents leave, Laura reminds Rob that her parents bought adjoining plots as her dowry. Rob thinks they have plenty of time to settle it. Her parents are coming for dinner this Friday. Laura calls Rob at the office and tells him that her father and his father played golf together. The topic of the plots came up and Laura's father is upset. Buddy reminds Rob that the union provided a plot. Rob remembers that as a veteran he gets a plot. That night Mr. and Mrs. Meehan (Carl Benton Reid and Geraldine Wall) arrive. They are clearly upset. Mr. Meehan wants to talk to Rob in the kitchen, but nothing is really discussed. Laura tells Rob that his parents are coming by to talk about it. Rob thinks it's a competition over which parents they love more. Before Rob can tell them his parents are coming, they arrive. The fathers start arguing. When Rob decides that he and Laura will share cemetery plots with their own parents, Ritchie asks if they are splitting up and if they still love each other. This brings everyone back into perspective.
88	26	"Scratch My Car and Die"	Howard Morris	John Whedon	March 25, 1964	88
Rob has just bought a new sports car, which he loves. Laura mentions that she took their station wagon in for a tune up. She will need to use the new car tomorrow. It's her turn to carpool the children to school. Rob thinks the kids will ruin the car or something will happen to it. At the office, Rob tells Buddy and Sally about the new car. Rob calls Laura and asks her if she liked driving the car. Millie comes by and Laura tells her that when she came out of the market there was a large scratch along the passenger side of the car. Millie convinces Laura to not tell Rob about the scratch and try to have it repaired. When Rob comes home, Laura can't stop him from taking the car out for a ride. Rob comes home upset. Laura thinks he saw the scratch, but a knob came off inside the car. Laura says she needs the car again because the station wagon still isn't ready. Rob tells her the kids can take a cab. Robs gets to the office and tells Mel, Buddy and Sally about the scratch. Rob thinks it happened when he parked it in the city garage. He wants to sue the garage. Rob tells Laura he's going to see Marvin, his lawyer. When he gets back Laura tells him the truth and Rob is understanding. Rob confesses that he didn't pay attention and struck several posts with the car.
89	27	"The Return of Edwin Carp"	Howard Morris	Carl Reiner	April 1, 1964	89
Sally and Buddy are over at Rob's house. They are upset because Rob agreed to write a show even though Alan is on vacation. Rob comes up with the idea to do a show around old-time radio performers. Sally, Buddy and Laura don't think anyone today would care about those people. Rob suggests trying to get "The Mad Russian" (Bert Gordon), "The Chatterbox" (Arlene Harris), and "Fish Man Edwin Carp" (Richard Haydn), who did fish imitations. Buddy calls and convinces Burt to be on the show. Rob tracks down Edwin at his pet shop. Edwin agrees to perform. After Rob leaves, Edwin's Mother (Amzie Strickland) tells him he can't be on the show and he knows why. At the office, Mel brings in Arlene and she does a routine for them. Rob is about to take Sally and Buddy to see Edwin at the pet shop when Laura comes by. They all go to see Edwin. Edwin thinks his act might be too old fashioned. He does one bit and they love it. Edwin then does a fish impression. Rehearsals have been going well and the show is tomorrow night. Edwin comes by Rob's house and says he can't do the show. He says that he has such bad stage fright that he can only perform in front of an audience drunk. Edwin says he can't start drinking again. Rob says they have a contract and Edwin reluctantly says he'll be there. Edwin does perform sober and he does very well.
90	28	"October Eve"	Jerry Paris	Bill Persky and Sam Denoff	April 8, 1964	90
Sally calls Laura from an art gallery. Sally says there's a painting of Laura there. She asks Laura if she recognizes the name Sergei Carpetna (Carl Reiner). Laura meets Sally at the gallery. A man named Henry (Howard Wendell) and his wife are admiring the painting of Laura which is called October Eve. Laura tells Sally that when they were first married Rob wanted a painting of her. At the office, Rob tells Buddy that Sally said something that upset Laura. Now Sally is late to work. Rob knows they're up to something. At home Laura tells Rob she had a painting done of herself. Flashback to Laura posing in Sergei's studio. Laura commissioned him for a fully clothed portrait of herself. Sergei, taking artistic license, rendered her nude. Laura throws paint on it, thinking she ruined it. She didn't know that Sergei fixed it. Back to the present. Rob says he's not upset, but would've like to have seen the painting. Laura says the painting is in the art gallery. Now Rob is upset and he goes to the gallery. He meets Sergei, who says he's had three offers for the painting. Mel comes in and Rob tries to prevent him from seeing the painting. Laura remembers that she paid for the painting. Rob comes up with a way for Sergei to sell the painting and make Rob and Laura happy. Notes: The title and plot of this episode are an allusion to the controversial oil painting September Morn (1911).; This episode was colorized and shown on CBS-TV on December 22, 2017. and again on July 3, 2020 to mark the passing of Carl Reiner as it was one of his favorite episodes of the series.
91	29	"Dear Mrs. Petrie, Your Husband Is in Jail"	Jerry Paris	Jerry Belson and Garry Marshall	April 15, 1964	91
Rob is in jail on a Saturday night. Laura comes by because she found a note on the front door stating Rob was in jail. Laura wants to know what happened and why didn't he call her. She says he should've gone with her to Aunt Martha's for the weekend. Rob was charged with illegal gambling and assault of an officer with a deadly weapon. The weapon was a cannon. Rob says that after he dropped her and Ritchie off at the train, he went home but couldn't sleep. Flashback to that night. Rob decides to watch some TV, but then falls asleep. The next morning, he goes to a movie matinee. After, he calls Buddy to see if he's free that night, but Buddy has plans. Rob makes several more calls with no luck. Eventually, he looks in on Benny Joey (Herkie Styles), an old Army buddy, who is a stand-up comic at a nightclub. Backstage at the nightclub Rob meets Maureen Core (Barbara Stuart), whose military themed act uses a small cannon. Maureen takes Rob to her dressing room where Benny and some other guys are gambling. Things get a little heated between the gamblers. Rob keeps trying to leave, but Benny makes him stay. The police arrive and take everyone away. As one of the officers pulls Rob, Rob bumps into the cannon and it goes off. Back to the present, Benny clears Rob with the police and he's free to go. Arthur Batanides as Arnold. Jackie Joseph as Alberta Schweitzer. Johnny Silver as Nick.
92	30	"My Neighbor's Husband's Other Life"	Jerry Paris	Carl Reiner, Bill Persky and Sam Denoff	April 22, 1964	92
Rob and Laura are at a nice restaurant before going to the theater. Jerry walks in with a pretty blonde woman and they make sure he doesn't see them. Laura tells Rob that Millie said the reason they couldn't go with them that night was because Jerry was busy at the office. At home, Laura notices that Jerry's car isn't back yet. Laura thinks Jerry is cheating on Millie and Rob thinks there's got to be a logical explanation. Just then Jerry comes to the back door. Laura mentions that they had dinner at the White Peacock. Jerry says he was there, but he didn't see them. Jerry says he was there with a doctor friend, Tony Gagliarty. After he leaves, Laura tells Rob he needs to talk to Jerry. The next day Rob calls Jerry, but Jerry keeps coming up with excuses not to get together. Later, Millie comes by and tearfully says that Jerry was with someone last night, but she won't say who and leaves. At the office, Sally says she saw Jerry with a short red headed woman a couple weeks ago. Rob confronts Jerry and Jerry says the blonde was Toni Gagliarty. Rob then asks who the redhead was and Jerry says it was his cousin Sheila. Jerry finally says that the blonde was Millie's idea. Toni is a marriage counselor. He and Millie have been fighting lately and they wanted help. Johnny Silver as Waiter.
93	31	"I'd Rather Be Bald Than Have No Head at All"	Jerry Paris	Bill Persky and Sam Denoff	April 29, 1964	93
Rob tells Laura that he thinks he's going bald. Rob worries Laura won't love him anymore. Laura thinks Rob is overreacting. At the office, Buddy mentions that the guest star this week wears a toupee. Sally tells Rob he's not losing his hair. Rob asks Mel when he first started going bald. Buddy tells Rob to go see his barber Irwin (Ned Glass). Irwin inspects Rob's hair and says he's been neglecting it. Irwin gives Rob a bottle with a special concoction to help his hair. When Irwin tells Rob the ingredients, it sounds like a salad dressing. After Laura learns what the ingredients are, she tells Rob to go see a real doctor. Laura has a dream that Rob wakes up bald. Laura claims that the concoction made him bald and he should get his money back from Irwin. Rob, in his pajamas, goes to see Irwin who then puts mayonnaise on Rob's head. While this is happening, Laura is dancing in the background. Rob then goes to the office with a towel around his head. Laura is also there. Sally knit Rob a toupee. When Rob takes the towel off, his head is covered in lettuce. Mel comes in with Rob's hair on his head. Laura wakes up. Rob does go see a doctor who tells him he's fine.
94	32	"Teacher's Petrie"	Jerry Paris	Jerry Belson and Garry Marshall	May 13, 1964	94
Laura went to sign up her and Rob up for a night school Spanish class. She tells Rob that by the time her and Millie got there, the Spanish class was full. So she signed her and Millie up for a creative writing class. Laura says that the teacher, Mr. Caldwell (Bernard Fox), said she shows promise. Rob gets suspicious when Laura says she had to tell Caldwell Rob's occupation. Rob thinks Caldwell flattered Laura in hopes of meeting him or having him do Caldwell a favor. Millie comes over and her and Laura go to class. Later, Laura comes home and tells Rob that Caldwell said her essay was the best in the class. Rob once again questions Caldwell's motives and it upsets Laura. Rob apologizes and reads Laura's essay. Rob says it's not very good. At the office, Rob reads the essay to Buddy and Sally. They agree it's not good. Buddy suggests that Rob tell Caldwell he'll do anything he wants and then maybe Caldwell will stop giving Laura false praise. At the class, they are listening to Miss Prinder's (Cheerio Meredith) and Millie's essays. Caldwell keeps Laura after class. It's not long before Caldwell makes a play for her and tells her he loves her. Rob comes by and finds out what happened. When Sally hears about it, she jokes that she should sign up for the class.

=== Season 4 (1964–1965) ===
- Season 4 of The Dick Van Dyke Show consisted of 32 black-and-white half-hour episodes.

No. overall	No. in season	Title	Directed by	Written by	Original release date	Prod. code
95	1	"My Mother Can Beat Up My Father"	Jerry Paris	Bill Persky and Sam Denoff	September 23, 1964	96
Rob is in the hospital with his head in traction. Laura thinks Rob is angry with her and leaves. Rob wants to put down on tape what happened to him. Miss Taylor, his nurse, agrees to turn on the tape recoder if she can stay and listen. Rob starts the story by saying that his wife is responsible for him being in the hospital. Flashback to three days ago. Rob and Laura are at a fancy restaurant. They are at the bar until their table is ready. Mr. Cavendish (Paul Gilbert), who is quite drunk, is flirting with Laura. Bartender Vinnie (Lou Cutell) refuses to give him any more drinks. Columnist Ed Wilson comes by and says hello to Rob and Laura. Rob tries to get rid of Cavendish, who then punches Rob in the nose. Laura surprises Rob by using a judo throw that flattens Cavendish. At the office, Rob learns that Ed Wilson wrote an article about what happened. Sally and Buddy tease Rob, who now feels embarrassed and emasculated. Rob endures a day of teasing and comes home angry. When Rob challenges Laura, she flattens him with the same judo move. Rob learns that the show's chorus lead, Tony Daniels (Ken Berry), knows judo. To regain his confidence, Rob takes a few lessons from Tony to show Laura a few moves. It is one of those moves that lands Rob in the hospital.
96	2	"The Ghost of A. Chantz"	Jerry Paris	Bill Persky and Sam Denoff	September 30, 1964	97
Rob, Laura, Buddy and Sally arrive at a fishing lodge for a working weekend. Rob calls Alan's room and tells Mel that they are here. Mr. Little (Maurice Brenner), the lodge clerk, says there are no reservations for them and there are no rooms available. Mel comes by and realizes he forgot to make the reservations. Mr. Little tells Rob and Mel there is a cabin nearby, but it hasn't been used in three years and it's haunted. The last person to use the cabin was Amos Chantz. He and his money disappeared without a trace. Rob will take the cabin but won't mention it being haunted to the women. Buddy learns about the legend. The cabin turns out to be nice and the girls will share the one bedroom. Rob and Buddy are startled by a Caretaker (Milton Parsons), who brings some wood for the fireplace. The Caretaker says even though no one has stayed here, he's been bringing wood for three years. When he leaves, there's suddenly a fire in the fireplace. Other strange things start happening. They are all scared and are about to leave when a storm starts outside. Without the others seeing it, Buddy is pulled out the door. Suddenly Sally is gone. Rob doesn't see it, but Laura is pulled out the door. Rob discovers that the whole thing was being filmed as a new project Alan came up with.
97	3	"The Lady and the Babysitter"	Jerry Paris	Bill Persky and Sam Denoff	October 7, 1964	98
Rob and Laura come back from a night out. Roger McChesney (Eddie Hodges), their 17 year old babysitter, says that everything went well with Ritchie. Roger even repaired their toaster. What they don't know is that Roger has a huge crush on Laura. The next day, Roger comes by to help Ritchie with his homework. Somehow the subject of the boys Laura was attracted to when she was younger comes up. Laura senses that he's in unrequited love with a girl. Roger does say there is a girl, but she doesn't know how he feels. Roger also says there's another guy. That night, Laura asks Rob to talk to Roger man to man. The next day, Roger is over working on Rob's car. Rob tells Roger he really needs to let the girl know how he feels. Rob suggests Roger write the girl a letter. Rob and Laura learn who the girl is when Laura gets Roger's love letter. The letter also states that Roger is leaving town. Laura is worried and wants Rob to talk to Roger again. Rob finds Roger in the library. Rob lets Roger know that they aren't mad and Roger feels better. Roger says that the reason he's leaving town is that his father has been transferred to Detroit. Song: Eddie performs "The Thing".
98	4	"A Vigilante Ripped My Sports Coat"	Peter Baldwin	Carl Reiner	October 14, 1964	99
At the office, Mel is collecting clothes for a charity drive. Rob brings a jacket with a ripped pocket. He says that Jerry did it and they haven't spoken in two weeks. Rob says he wanted to extend an olive branch by sending an invitation to the Helpers to attend a dinner party at their house. But they never showed up. Rob explains what happened. Flashback to two weeks ago. Rob and Jerry had a disagreement at a community meeting. Laura gives Rob the invitations for the dinner party to mail. Jerry comes by. Jerry and some neighbors have a problem with new neighbor Gilbert Bester's crabgrass. He wants to go and spray it without Gilbert's permission, but Rob thinks that's being a vigilante. Rob inadvertently rips a button off of Jerry's jacket. Jerry rips Rob's pocket. Rob doesn't know Jerry never got the invite. When the Helpers don't show up to the party, Rob thinks he and Laura have been snubbed. Back to the present. Mel finds Jerry's invitation in Rob's jacket and will mail it. Jerry thinks it's tacky to get an invitation on the day of a party, but he reluctantly agrees to go. Jerry and Millie arrive and Ritchie tells them his parents went out. Rob and Laura are at a restaurant and they see Millie and Jerry come in. Things get very confusing over the misunderstanding, but things do work out.
99	5	"The Man from Emperor"	Jerry Paris	Carl Reiner, Bill Persky and Sam Denoff	October 21, 1964	100
Rob tells Buddy and Sally that Drew Patton (Lee Philips), an old friend of his, offered him a job as a consultant in the humor section of his hugely successful but racy gentlemen's magazine, Emperor. Rob remembers Drew from college as a bookworm who never had a date. Drew comes by the office to make plans for discussing the offer. Rob calls Laura and she says she thought he was going to turn down the job. Drew winds up being invited to Rob's house for dinner. That night Laura asks Drew why he never married. He says it would ruin his image, because every guy envies the life he leads. It's an awkward evening and they never do discuss the offer. Drew had sent for desert and a beautiful woman, also named Laura (Gloria Neil), delivers it. Rob will meet again with Drew tomorrow night. At Drew's place, there are a lot of beautiful women there. Rob is introduced to pretty Florence (Sally Carter), who would be his secretary if he took the job. Rob gets home very late. He implies to Laura that he took the job. Laura admits to Rob why she is so scared of him working for Drew. Rob tells Laura he didn't take the job.
100	6	"Romance, Roses and Rye Bread"	Jerry Paris	Garry Marshall and Jerry Belson	October 28, 1964	101
At the office, Sally finds a red rose in her desk. Rob says Sally must have a secret admirer. Rob and Buddy notice the rose smells of pastrami. Deli man Bert Monker (Sid Melton) comes by with the lunch they ordered. Bert says that he left the rose as an annivesary gift. It was one year ago that Sally walked into his shop. He also gives her a ticket to a play. Bert hints that he likes Sally, but she doesn't take him seriously. Mel comes by and says that Alan didn't like the sketch. They have to write another one even if they have to work into the night. They then need to drop it off at Alan's penthouse. To make up for not being home for dinner, Rob gives Laura the play ticket. At the play, Laura is sitting next to Bert, who was expecting Sally. Laura doesn't know who he is. Back at home, Rob realizes what happened and that Bert is serious about Sally. At the office, Rob tells Sally what happened. Bert is not her type, but she does not want to hurt him. Bert goes to Sally's house and brings food. Things are very awkward for Sally. Sally finds a way to make Bert understand that it's not meant to be between them.
101	7	"4 1/2"	Jerry Paris	Garry Marshall and Jerry Belson	November 4, 1964	102
Rob, Buddy and Sally tell Mel they have been asked to do a benefit show at Granville State Prison. Rob was asked by old friend, convict Lyle Delp (Don Rickles), the entertainment director. They wonder if Mel could get them some prison outfits. Rob says he met Lyle when Lyle held him and Laura up about a month before she gave birth to Ritchie. Flashback to Rob taking Laura to the doctor because he thought she was having labor pains. They get on the elevator with another man. The man pushes the emergency button stopping the elevator between the fourth and fifth floor. The man claims to have a gun and wants to rob them. After he gets what he wants, he pushes a button the get the elevator to move again. The elevator doesn't move and is really stuck. They try to make Laura comfortable. The man offers his coat for her to sit on. Rob realizes the man never had a gun. They finally learn his name is Lyle Delp. With Lyle's help, Rob is able to get up through the trap door. There's nothing Rob can do up there so he comes back in the elevator. A voice yells down that a repairman is working to get things running again. While waiting they get to know each other. Back to the present. Rob says that instead of turning himself in, Lyle ran. Lyle was caught and has been in and out of jail ever since. Part 1 of 2
102	8	"The Alan Brady Show Goes to Jail"	Jerry Paris	Bill Persky and Sam Denoff	November 11, 1964	103
Warden Walter Jackson (Ken Lynch) tells Boxer Morrison (Robert Strauss), Harry Tinker (Arthur Batanides) and some other inmates, that because of their trouble making at the last show, they are not allowed to see this one. Buddy, Sally, Rob and Laura arrive at the prison to put on the show for Lyle Delp and his fellow inmates. Lyle tells Rob and Buddy he'd like to get into show business when he gets out. He also mentions that there hasn't been a show for some time. There was a riot during the last show because it wasn't good. It's time for the show. Rob and Laura are wearing prison uniforms. Rob goes back for some chains that he and Laura were supposed to wear. Guard Jenkins (Allan Melvin) mistakes Rob for a real prisoner. Rob gets thrown in a cell with the other trouble making prisoners. Lyle introduces Buddy with his cello. Meanwhile, Boxer Morrison wants Rob to entertain them. Laura wonders where Rob is, but Warden Jackson assures her they'll find him. Sally is next to entertain. Rob keeps trying to tell Jenkins that he's part of the show. The other inmates now back up Rob's story, but Jenkins still doesn't believe them. Rob finds a way to prove he's not an inmate and it involves underwear. Rob and Laura are next to entertain. Songs: Rose sings "Cotton Fields". Mary and Dick sing "I've Got Your Number". Dick, Arthur, Robert and Vincent Barbi sing "Camptown Races". Part 2 of 2 Note: Alan is misspelled "Allan" in the onscreen title.
103	9	"Three Letters from One Wife"	Jerry Paris	Bill Persky and Sam Denoff	November 18, 1964	104
Alan is showing Mel his new toupee. He lets Mel have his old one. Rob wrote a script for a cultural show called "Project Greatness". Alan wants to know why Rob recommended he be on the show. Alan doesn't want to be on something that isn't a comedy. Alan reluctantly agrees to do it, but if it doesn't turn out well, there will be people looking for another job. In the office, even Buddy and Sally don't think it's a good idea for Alan to do the show. Mel comes by and says that Alan didn't like the script. Rob now thinks he's off the hook. Alan calls Rob and Rob unintentionally talks Alan into still doing the show. Laura tells Millie that if Alan gets enough positive fan mail about the show, he'll consider it a success. Millie suggests writing a bunch of fan mail, but Laura wants nothing to do with it. It's the night of the show, but it is pre-empted and is not aired. Millie comes by and tells Laura she wrote fourteen letters to Alan praising the program and mailed them. Millie tells her the general things she wrote and she also praised Rob. They tell Rob about what happened. The next day, Rob decides to tell Alan the truth and goes to his office. Before he can say anything, Rob thinks that Alan is about to fire him, but Alan compliments Rob. Alan screened the show for some network executives and they now give him respect. Turns out Mel saved the day by pulling the letters before Alan saw them. Note: This episode is the first episode in the series where Carl Reiner as Alan Brady starts appearing without his face being obscured.
104	10	"Pink Pills and Purple Parents"	Alan Rafkin	Jerry Belson and Garry Marshall	November 25, 1964	106
Sally comes into the office with a tremendous headache. Buddy offers Sally one of his back pain pills. Rob tells them to never take someone else's prescription. Rob says that Laura once did it and had terrible side effects. Flashback to Rob still in the Army and he'd only been married a couple months. Rob tells Laura that his parents, Sam (Tom Tully) and Clara Petrie (Isabel Randolph), will be visiting tomorrow night. Laura's never met them and she's a little anxious. She wants to make a good impression. Laura asks Millie for advice. Millie offers her some of her own prescribed relaxation pills. Rob comes home and while trying to calm Laura down, he accidentally hits her under her eye. Later, Sam and Clara arrive. Laura panics and takes a couple of Millie's pills. Things are a little awkward and Sam tries to lighten the mood. Clara keeps things on the serious side. Laura takes another pill. Laura serves dinner and starts to feel light headed. She has a glass of wine and Rob is starting to get concerned with the way she's acting. Laura starts acting very silly and Sam and Clara are wondering what's going on. Laura eventually passes out. Back to the present. Rob says that his parents understood when they found out what happened to Laura.
105	11	"It Wouldn't Hurt Them to Give Us a Raise"	Peter Baldwin	Jay Burton and Ernest Chambers	December 2, 1964	105
Buddy and Sally learn that the writers for the Cliff Barnett Show are the highest paid writers in the business. Despite Alan Brady owning that show, it is not as popular as Alan's show. Feeling underappreciated, Sally and Buddy go on strike. Because he's the head writer, Buddy and Sally want Rob to ask Alan for their 10 percent raises. Alan tells Rob to speak with Doug Wesley (Roger C. Carmel), Alan's accountant. Doug tells Rob about Alan's convoluted corporate structure. The part of the corporation that pays Buddy and Sally isn't doing well. The part that pays Rob is doing great. Because of this befuddling structure, Rob winds up getting a raise and Buddy and Sally still get nothing. At home, Rob tells Laura that he's getting a 15 percent raise. He doesn't know how to tell Buddy and Sally. Laura suggests that Rob figure out how to give part of his raise to them. Rob calls Marvin, his accountant, and learns that isn't possible. At the office, Rob tells Buddy and Sally what happened. After they talk to Doug, Buddy and Sally tell him they are quitting. Rob goes to tell Doug he is quitting as well. Under their contract, they can't quit, but they can be fired. But Doug rehires them under one of Alan's well doing companies and they all get raises.
106	12	"The Death of the Party"	Alan Rafkin	Bill Persky and Sam Denoff	December 9, 1964	107
It's very early in the morning and Rob is sneaking out of the house to go golfing. Laura is woken up and catches him when he has to come back for his keys and money. Laura doesn't want Rob to go golfing in the cold damp weather. He'll either get sick or be tired from also working and ruin her party with her relatives that night. Later at the office, Buddy and Sally come back from lunch and Rob is sleeping on the couch. Rob isn't feeling well. Laura calls and he pretends everything is fine. Back at home, Laura tells Millie that the relatives are coming to see Uncle Harold (Willard Waterman). It's an annual event and it's her turn. Rob comes home still pretending to feel fine. He says he'll take a shower, but Laura finds him sleeping on the bed. While Laura is dressing, Millie comes by and catches Rob sneezing uncontrollably. The guests arrive and the house is full. After a while, Laura can tell something's wrong with Rob as he's very quiet and aloof. The guests agree to play charades. It's Rob's turn and all he can do is cough and sneeze. He finally collapses. After the doctor checks him out, Laura learns Rob had the virus before he went golfing. Jane Dulo as Cousin Margaret.
107	13	"My Two Show-Offs and Me"	Jerry Paris	Sheldon Keller and Howard Merrill	December 16, 1964	95
At the office, Rob gets a call from Mel. Rob says he's against the idea, but he'll give Mel an answer tomorrow. At home, Laura can tell that something is distracting Rob. Rob says that he made a decision without consulting Buddy and Sally. Manhattan Magazine wants to do an article on the show and send a reporter to watch a writing session. Rob decided against it because he, Buddy and Sally will let their egos get the best of them and make fools of themselves. Laura thinks the publicity would be good and he should talk to Buddy and Sally. At the office, Buddy and Sally think they should allow the reporter to come and Rob reluctantly goes along. The next day Sally comes in with a fancy dress and Buddy arrives dressed as an admiral. They say they just did it as a joke. A Lorraine Gilman (Doris Singleton) arrives. All three start acting self important and wind up at each other's throats. Lorraine says she has all she needs and leaves. The three feel horrible about what happened and how they acted. Mel comes by and asks if he can bring in Ed Palmer from Manhattan Magazine. Mel says that Lorraine was a decorator. He was thinking of having the office redone. Rob, Buddy and Sally tell Mel to get rid of the reporter.
108	14	"Stretch Petrie vs. Kid Schenk"	Jerry Paris	Garry Marshall and Jerry Belson	December 30, 1964	108
Laura brings in a package from outside. Inside is an attaché case and perfume. Rob then gets a call from Neil Schenk (Jack Carter), an old friend. He sent the gifts and would like to get together. Laura wants nothing to do with Neil, who calls Rob "Stretch", which she hates. Neil got Rob his first big job and constantly wants favors as a repayment. Rob and Laura meet Neil at a restaurant and he's as obnoxious as ever. Neil wants to get a job at the advertising agency that does commercials for The Alan Brady Show. He wants Rob to write him a glowing letter of recommendation. Back at home, Rob tells Laura that Neil isn't right for the job. The next day, Rob is having a hard time writing the letter. Neil comes by and says that he wrote the letter. All Rob has to do is sign it. Rob is stalling, but then reluctantly signs the letter. Rob tells Laura that the letter also stated that he is to take Bill Sampson (Peter Hobbs), head of the advertising agency, to lunch this Thursday. There Rob is to give a personal recommendation. At the lunch, Bill says if Rob feels that strongly about Neil, he's in. Rob tells Bill the truth. Later, Rob tells Neil he didn't get the job and he tells him why. Neil actually isn't upset. Albert Carrier as Head Waiter. Lynn Borden as Second Model. Sally Carter as Girl.
109	15	"Brother, Can You Spare $2500?"	Jerry Paris	Garry Marshall and Jerry Belson	January 6, 1965	110
Rob comes home from the office in the middle of the night. He realizes that he lost the script that they worked so hard on somewhere at Grand Central Station. The next morning Laura drives Rob to the station and they go to the lost and found area. They speak with the attendant, Harry Keen (Herbie Faye), but the script isn't there. They then go to tell Buddy and Sally. Rob gets a call from a homeless bum (Gene Baylos) that found the script. Rob says that they'll give him a reward of $25. Rob builds up how important the script is and the bum now wants $2500. The bum says he'll call back later. Rob, Buddy and Sally pool what money they have and with Mel's unknowing help, come up with $100. The bum calls back and agrees to the amount. He tells Rob where to drop the money off. Rob goes to the park and runs into a bum (Tiny Brauer) and thinks it's the guy with the script. After something that Rob says, the bum is insulted and leaves. Another bum comes by and finds the money in the paper bag. Rob assaults him when he doesn't turn over the script. A policeman (Larry J. Blake) comes by. Rob learns it's not the bum he's waiting for and is taken away by the policeman. Rob is finally released and goes back to the office with no script. With all hope lost and the show in jeopardy, the bum surprisingly shows up at their office with script in hand, having witnessed Rob's arrest. The bum agrees to the original $25.
110	16	"The Impractical Joke"	Jerry Paris	Bill Persky and Sam Denoff	January 13, 1965	109
Mel and Buddy and several other friends are at a party at Sally's place. Rob and Laura are not there. Buddy is entertaining by playing a series of telephone pranks on unsuspecting people. Buddy convinces his comic friend Phil Franklin (Lennie Weinrib) to call Rob to pull a prank about problems with Rob's telephone. Phil has Rob do some silly things to try and fix his phone. Rob finally learns it's a prank and that Buddy was involved. Rob wants to get even, but Laura reminds him to be a good sport. At the office, Rob claims he's not going to do anything, but Buddy isn't so sure. Later, Rob tells Laura that all day, Buddy was panicking. A William Handlebuck (Alvy Moore) from the IRS comes to the office to talk to Buddy. Buddy gives him a hard time thinking it's a gag Rob set up. Rob convinces Buddy that Handlebuck is really from the IRS and Buddy is terrified that he's in trouble. Hoping to straighten things out for Buddy, Rob is able to get Handlebuck to come back. Buddy apologizes to Handlebuck. It turns out that it was Phil pulling a prank on Buddy. Phil manages to pull another prank on Buddy as well. Johnny Silver as Party Guest #1.
111	17	"Stacey Petrie - Part I"	Jerry Paris	Carl Reiner	January 20, 1965	111
Fresh out of the Army, Stacey Petrie (Jerry Van Dyke) makes a surprise visit. Stacy tells Laura that he'll be opening a nightclub and he's getting married. He's been writing the girl, but hasn't actually met her. Later, Stacey tells Rob and Laura that the girl is a friend of an army buddy, she lives in New York City, and he hasn't asked her to marry him yet. Rob and Laura find out her name is Julie. It's been four days and Stacey has yet to get in contact with her. Stacey says he's still shy around girls. Stacey suggests a practice date with Sally. At the office, Sally agrees to have Stacey over for dinner. That night, Herman Glimscher (Bill Idelson) calls Sally, but she says she's busy. Stacey arrives and Sally tries to get a conversation going about Julie. Stacey confesses that he's been writing her using the name James Garner. Later, Rob and Laura go to Sally's building and run into Dr. Lemler (Howard Wendell). Lemler tells them there was a problem at Sally's place. When Rob and Laura get to Sally's apartment, the place is a complete mess. Sally explains what happened. Flashback to earlier. Stacey says that James Garner is a drummer friend of his, not the actor. Jim wanted to communicate with Julie and had Stacey write all the letters. After Jim wanted to stop, Stacey keep writing to Julie. Herman comes by. He thinks Stacey attacked Sally and starts going after him. That's how the place gets destroyed and Stacey gets a bump on his head. Back to the present, Sally is happy that Herman finally showed how he felt about her.
112	18	"Stacey Petrie - Part II"	Jerry Paris	Carl Reiner, Bill Persky and Sam Denoff	January 27, 1965	112
It's the day before Stacey's grand opening at the club, which is more of a coffee house. Rob and Laura tell Millie that Stacey finally got up the nerve to tell Julie that he's the author of her love letters from "Jim". Stacey calls and says he still hasn't talked to Julie. Rob reminds him he should be at the club decorating. Rob and Laura head to the club. Meanwhile, Julie tells her Butler that she thinks she's been stood up. The Butler finds Stacey standing outside the front door. Julie asks about Jim and Stacey's club. Stacey gives Julie a letter that explains he was the one that was writing the letters at the end. Julie is furious and slaps Stacey. At the club, Lou Temple (Herbie Faye) tells Rob and Laura that the kitchen is ready. Lou mentions how many owners the club has had and couldn't make a go of it. Stacey arrives and tells them that he just spent time with Willie Cooke (Carl Reiner), a drunken actor who was laying in the gutter. Stacey says that things didn't go well with Julie. Rob and Laura try to convince Stacey that there could always be someone else. Stacey sneaks out of the club. Back at home, Rob gets a call from Julie, who's been looking for Stacey. Julie figures that she liked the man that wrote the letters and that's Stacey. She would like to go to the club opening. At the opening, Lou says that Stacey hasn't showed up. Willie Cooke is there and says that Stacey will arrive soon and Stacey does. Just then Julie arrives and her and Stacey make up.
113	19	"Boy #1, Boy #2"	Jerry Paris	Martin Ragaway	February 3, 1965	114
Millie is over with her son Freddie (Peter Oliphant). Rob comes home and tells them that Mel will be directing a car commercial. Mel would like to use a non-professional kid and he suggested Ritchie. Rob turned Mel down. Millie thinks Freddie would be good for the part and Rob gets trapped into letting him. Ritchie wants to know why he isn't in the commercial. Rob decides to use both boys. Rob will make the script equal for both kids. At the office, Mel wants the revised script as soon as possible. Laura and Millie come by after dropping the boys off at the dressing room. The boys are to wear baseball uniforms. Laura is upset because Ritchie will be the catcher and wear a catcher's mask. No one will see his face. Mel tells Rob that he can't get anything done with the two mother's interfering. Rob goes to the set and he winds up having to lock Laura and Millie in a dressing room. That night at home, Laura and Millie apologize to Rob. Rob tells them that he had to hire some professional children as the boys just keep getting worse. The boys weren't upset because they still got paid. Albert Cavens as Film Crew Member.
114	20	"The Redcoats Are Coming"	Jerry Paris	Bill Persky and Sam Denoff	February 10, 1965	113
Popular British rock duo The Redcoats (Chad & Jeremy) will be performing on Alan's show. There are screaming girl fans all over the place. Mel arrives with Ernie, Freddie and their manager Richard Karp (William Beckley). Mel tells Rob that Ernie and Freddie have not been able to get any sleep because their fans always find what hotel they're in. Mel would like Rob to let them spend the night at his house. Back at the house, Laura is getting calls from everyone wanting tickets to the show. Rob calls Laura with the news. Mel is to bring the guys in a laundry truck. That night Rob and Laura wonder where Mel, Ernie and Freddie are. They finally arrive and Mel reminds Rob that no one must find out. Three girls come by. They wanted to be close to Rob because he was close to The Redcoats. Rob and Laura admit to each other that they would love to tell someone that the boys are here. In the morning Rob and Laura take movies with the boys. Laura calls Millie and tells her to come over right away. Mel shows up. Thinking it's Millie, Rob opens the front door, but it's the three girls. They see Ernie and Freddie and start screaming. Mel gets the boys out the back. A swarm of girls come in the house and start taking things. Trudi Ames as Marge. Songs: Chad and Jeremy sing "No Other Baby" and "My How the Time Goes By".
115	21	"The Case of the Pillow"	Howard Morris	Bill Persky and Sam Denoff	February 17, 1965	115
Rob is taking on a Mr. Wiley (Alvy Moore) in court. Rob tells Judge Nathaniel Taylor (Ed Begley) that he will be representing himself. Rob manages to annoy Taylor. Laura bought four pillows from Wiley. Flashback to that day. Rob thinks the pillows smell of chickens. The next morning Laura calls Wiley and he agrees to come over that night. Wiley claims he doesn't smell anything and they are imagining things. Wiley brings his wife May (Amzie Strickland) in and has her smell the pillows. May says she doesn't smell anything either. Wiley suggests just airing the pillows out for a couple days and they leave. Rob and Laura think Riley is a crook. They start to believe they'll never see Wiley again. After a few days Rob and Laura have Buddy, Sally, Jerry and Millie over. The guests also smell chickens. Back to the present. Rob says while waiting for the case to come to trial, the pillows stopped smelling. Rob had a lab check the pillows and they were mostly filled with chicken feathers. Despite still annoying Taylor, Rob wins the case. Joel Fluellen as the Bailiff. Johnny Silver as Man #1.
116	22	"Young Man with a Shoehorn"	Jerry Paris	Jerry Belson and Garry Marshall	February 24, 1965	116
Alan is going to reuse some previous sketches on some network specials. Because of this, Mel hands Buddy, Sally and Rob bonus checks. Buddy is going to invest in his Uncle Lou's (Lou Jacobi) discount shoe store. Sally and Rob agree to go see the store. At the store, Lou introduces them to his salesman Sid Feldman (Milton Frome). Back at home, Laura thinks there are better things to do with the money, but Rob is thinking the shoe store. After Rob invests, Laura and Millie go to the store. Laura may regret Rob's decision after receiving horrible service from salesman Sid, who doesn't know she is Rob's wife. After Laura insisting and feeling the need to protect his investment, Rob and Buddy talk to Sid about the situation. Sid, not taking any guff from a new investor, promptly quits. As Lou isn't around at the time, Rob and Buddy mind the store till his return. It isn't easy, but Rob and Buddy do make some sales. Lou finally arrives and says he ran into Sid. Lou tells Rob and Buddy that he needs a salesman like Sid. Lou also mentions that Sid quits three times a week and always comes back. Irving Bacon, Jane Dulo and Amzie Strickland appear as customers.
117	23	"Girls Will Be Boys"	Jerry Paris	Jerry Belson and Garry Marshall	March 3, 1965	117
Laura asks Millie, who's a crossing guard at school, to keep an eye on Ritchie. He's come home twice all bruised up. Just then Ritchie comes home and claims he was beat up. He tells Laura that a girl named Priscilla Darwell did it. Later, Rob tells Laura that Ritchie claims that Priscilla hits him for no reason. Rob taught Ritchie to never hit a girl. Rob still believes Ritchie isn't telling them everything. Rob meets with Mr. Ogden Darwell (Bernard Fox). Rob explains the problem and Ogden calls Priscilla. Priscilla says she loves Ritchie and didn't hit him. Rob tells Ogden that he's embarrassed because Ritchie obviously is lying to him. Back at home Rob tells Laura that he thinks a bully made Ritchie promise to not tell on him. Millie comes by and says that her Freddie saw Priscilla hit Ritchie. Laura calls Rob at the office and tells him Ritchie was beat up again. Laura goes to speak with Mrs. Dolly Darwell (Doris Singleton). Laura says that they have a witness to Priscilla hitting Ritchie, but Dolly doesn't believe it. Dolly is very rude to Laura. At home, Rob thinks they should let Ritchie hit Priscilla back. Ritchie is thrilled with the news. Ritchie comes home and tells his parents that he didn't hit Priscilla, he kissed her. Apparently Priscilla always asked Ritchie for a kiss and when he wouldn't, she'd hit him.
118	24	"Bupkis"	Lee Philips	Bill Persky and Sam Denoff	March 10, 1965	118
Rob recognizes a song called Bupkis that is playing on the radio. He calls the station and learns the song was written by Buzzy Potter. The problem is that Rob wrote the lyrics to it. At the office, Rob tells Buddy and Sally that Buzzy was a guy that he wrote songs with back when the two were in the Army. Rob says that Buzzy called him up a couple months ago. Flashback to that time. Buzzy comes by the office and they reminisce about their time together. Buzzy would like Rob to quit his job and help him peddle their old songs. Instead, Rob gives Buzzy outright ownership of the songs. Back to the present, Buddy says Rob should get a lawyer. At home, Rob finally gets up the nerve to tell Laura. Laura gets Rob to write Buzzy a letter. He gets a letter from Buzzy's lawyers asking Rob to sign away rights to the songs. When Rob goes to confront Buzzy, he runs into another old army pal named Frank 'Sticks' Mandalay (Greg Morris). Turns out that Sticks actually wrote the music to Bupkis, with Buzzy contributing nothing except his name on the music sheet. Rob and Sticks get the rights to the song and Rob gets a very small royalty check. Tim Herbert as another Songwriter. Notes: Carl Reiner's voice is heard as a radio announcer in this episode. The song "Bupkis", only featured on record in the episode, is sung by pop duo Dick and Dee Dee
119	25	"Your Home Sweet Home Is My Home"	Lee Philips	Howard Ostroff and Joan Darling	March 17, 1965	119
Bert Steele (Eddie Ryder), Rob's new accountant, comes by the office to go over Rob's tax return. Bert wants to know why he writes an annual $37.50 "friendship" check to Jerry. Rob says that after they found out they were going to have a baby, they decided they needed a bigger house. They looked a countless without finding what they wanted. Laura finally finds a house she likes. Flashback to that day. Jack Parkly (Stanley Adams), their Real Estate Agent, brings Rob and Laura to the house. In the basement is a giant rock. Laura doesn't mind the rock, but Rob is against it. Jerry and Millie come by and are surprised by the rock. Millie and Jerry pretty much talk them out of buying the house. Rob promises Laura they'll find another house. Rob decides to take to house, only to learn that Millie and Jerry bought it. Sensing Rob and Laura are mad at them, Millie and Jerry try to explain why they did it. They find out from Parkly that the house next door is now available. Back to the present. Rob tells Bert it was decided that the Helpers would take that house and Rob got the house with the rock. The checks are to pay for water damage that the rock caused to Jerry's house.
120	26	"Anthony Stone"	Jerry Paris	Joseph C. Cavella	March 24, 1965	120
Rob and Buddy come to the office and find an orchid for Sally with a note from Tony Stone. Rob figures he's someone Sally met while on vacation in Jamaica. Sally arrives and Rob asks about Tony. Sally avoids the question and goes to put the flower away. She gives the guys some gifts and says what a great time she had. Sally says that Tony's rich, handsome and crazy about her. She won't tell them what he does for a living. Sally is out of the office and Tony comes by and has a diamond pin for her. Back at home, Laura tells Rob that she's having lunch with Sally tomorrow. Rob says there's something about Tony he doesn't like. At lunch, Laura finds out from Sally that Tony is a mortician. Sally is concerned about what her friends will think. Rob and Buddy discover that Tony is married. It's the end of the day and Laura comes by the office. Sally and Buddy leave. Something Laura says leads Rob to believe that Sally knows Tony is married. But then Laura mentions Tony being a mortician. Realizing Sally doesn't know, Rob tells Laura he's married. The next day Rob and Buddy try to figure out how they'll tell Sally. Before they can say anything, she decides she has had enough of Tony because of his terrible temper. Rob and Buddy are free to tell her their secret.
121	27	"Never Bathe on Saturday"	Jerry Paris	Carl Reiner	March 31, 1965	121
Rob carries Laura into the house. Rob and Laura explain to Millie why they cut their romantic getaway so short. Flashback to Rob and Laura arriving at the hotel. The bellboy (Bill Idelson, outside of his usual role as Herman Glimscher) shows them their room. They are very impressed in how classy the room is. Laura decides to take a bath before they go to the show. Rob uses Laura eye brow pencil to draw on a mustache. As he's doing it, a surly maid (Kathleen Freeman) comes in with some towels. Laura asks Rob to come in the bathroom, but the door is locked. Laura says her big toe is stuck in the bathtub faucet. A waiter (Johnny Silver) arrives with the champagne and caviar. The maid comes by with the key, but it doesn't work. Rob calls for an Engineer (Arthur Malet), but he has another emergency to take care of first. Rob tries to break the door down, but hurts his shoulders. The bellboy brings the House Detective (Bernard Fox), who thinks Laura is trying to protect herself from Rob. Rob manages to get the gun away from the Detective and shoots the bathroom door lock open. The Engineer finally arrives and saws the tip of the faucet off, but it's still stuck on Laura's toe. Back to the present. Laura says that they went to the theater, but it was too embarrassing. So they went to the hospital. Note: This episode was colorized and shown on CBS-TV on December 14, 2018.
122	28	"Show of Hands"	Theodore J. Flicker	Joseph C. Cavella	April 14, 1965	123
After a long day, Rob, Buddy and Sally are about to head home. Mel asks Rob if he and Laura could go to the CIU (committee of interracial understanding) dinner and accept an award for Alan. Alan can't because he and Mel are going to Chicago for an emergency meeting with a sponsor. Rob calls Laura and tells her about the formal dinner. Laura and Millie were making a costume for Ritchie's school play. Millie says she can press Rob's tuxedo and goes home. Laura accidentally dyes her hands black. Millie comes back and tells Laura that is a permanent dye. They go to see if Jerry can get the dye off. Rob comes home. Wanting to help Ritchie, Rob also sticks his hands in the dye. Rob calls both Buddy and Sally, but they can't go. Rob and Laura decide to wear gloves. They get to the dinner and meet Roger Johnson (Joel Fluellen) and Joe Clark. Roger presents the award to Rob. Rob decides to take off the gloves and tell the guests the truth. Everyone understands.
123	29	"Baby Fat"	Jerry Paris	Garry Marshall and Jerry Belson	April 21, 1965	124
Rob, Sally and Buddy are waiting in Alan's office. Mel comes in and says that Alan only wanted to see Rob. When they're alone, Alan tells Rob he's supposed to do a play called "Baby Fat" on Broadway. The play was written by Harper Worthington Yates (Strother Martin). Alan would like Rob to doctor up the play, because it's lacking humor. Rob doesn't feel good about tampering with the work of a noted playwright. Alan doesn't want Yates or anyone else to know. Rob reluctantly agrees to do it. At home, Laura thinks Rob should get credit for his rewrite. Alan calls and he needs Rob to come up to Connecticut. Rob gets to Alan's dressing room. Rob has to hide in the closet when Harper comes by. Harper wants to know if Alan liked the changes he made. Later, Lionel Dann (Sandy Kenyon), the director of the play, comes by. Alan introduces Rob as Vito, his tailor. Alan tells Rob that everyone love the new lines. Rob comes home angry because everyone thought he was a tailor and he wants credit for his help. At Alan's office, Rob and Alan discuss it with Harper, who winds up hiring another writer to help. Richard Erdman as Buck Brown, clothing designer of the play. Note: This episode was colorized and aired on CBS on May 21, 2021.
124	30	"One Hundred Terrible Hours"	Theodore J. Flicker	Bill Persky and Sam Denoff	May 5, 1965	122
Magazine reporter Mr. Waring (Dabbs Greer) is interviewing Rob and Laura. Rob says that after the Army, he was a radio disc jocker for two years. Then he got the job as head writer of The Alan Brady Show. Rob had been sending Alan comedy sketches hoping he would like them. Rob tells Waring that he doesn't really remember the interview with Alan. The radio station was the number two station out of two in the town. Flashback to that time. Rob just finished his show and Laura comes by. For publicity, William Van Buren (Fred Clark), the station manager, wants Rob to break the endurance record of 99 hours and 50 minutes. They will broadcast from a department store window. Dr. Gage will be there to keeps tabs on Rob. Rob is at the 24 hour mark and starts to get a little disoriented. It's the 94 hour mark and Rob starts crying over a story about a cat stuck in a tree. Laura brings Rob a telegram from Alan Brady. Alan wants to see him for an interview that evening at his hotel in Chicago. Rob does break the record and makes it to 100 hours. Laura helps Rob get to Chicago and they meet Mel Cooley, Alan's producer. Alan comes in the room and Rob is very disoriented. Back to the present. Laura tells Waring that she explained things to Alan and Rob got the job. Howard Wendell as Mr. Chambers, department store manager. Johnny Silver as Photographer.
125	31	"Br-rooom, Br-rooom"	Jerry Paris	Dale McRaven and Carl Kleinschmitt	May 12, 1965	125
Rob comes home and talks to Laura about freedom. Ritchie comes in and asks who's motorcycle is in the driveway. Laura is not happy with Rob because she thinks motorcycles are unsafe. She knew a boy in high school who got into an accident with one. Rob reluctantly agrees to return it. In the garage, Rob pretends he's driving the bike. Ritchie comes in and asks if he can sit on it. Because of something Ritchie says, Rob decides he's entitled to one ride. The next day Buddy and Sally come by with a gift for Rob. It's a leather jacket that says "Robby Baby" on the back. Laura tells them that Rob is taking the bike back. When Rob hesitates about agreeing with Laura, Buddy and Sally sense they better leave. Laura tells Rob he's a klutz. Rob thinks Laura is jealous of the motorcycle. Rob takes the bike out for a ride and stops at a burger stand. He asks the Counter Man (Johnny Silver) for a cup of tea. Some other young bikers pull up and make fun of Rob's bike. They do make Rob an honorary member of their club. A Policeman (Sandy Kenyon) comes by and wants to take the bikers in because they rode through a farmer's field. The Policeman thinks Rob is one of them. Back at home, Rob tells Laura he is getting rid of the bike because he almost got arrested. Bob Random as Mouse. Carl Reindel as Gus. Linda Marshall as Doris.
126	32	"There's No Sale Like Wholesale"	Jerry Paris	Garry Marshall and Jerry Belson	May 26, 1965	126
At the office, Rob shows Buddy and Sally in the paper the $500 fur coat he's going to buy Laura. Rob says that he and Laura decided that once a year they would buy each other a nice gift. Sally mentions that Buddy always says "I could've gotten it for you wholesale", but always after the fact. Sally dares him to prove it. Buddy takes Rob to see the wholesaler, Nunzio Vallani. Buddy is using a fake name. Nunzio brings out the exact coat that Rob wants. Nunzio tells Rob to pretend he'll buy ten coats and he gives Rob a fake name. Rob doesn't know Laura's size and Nunzio reminds him there's a no-return policy. Nunzio also says that Rob has to go to Long Island to pick up the coat. But, Rob likes the $250 price tag. Laura must pretend to be Nunzio's wife while picking it up. Laura and Millie go to get the coat. Laura tells Opal Levinger (Jane Dulo), the saleswoman, that she is Mrs. Vallani. Things get awkward for Laura when Opal asks questions about Nunzio's family. When they get home, Laura discovers the coat is way too big for her. Laura, and then later, Sally thinks Rob should tell Buddy. Rob thinks it will just cost him more money. Buddy asks Sally to apologize to him and she shows him the coat. Buddy does get Laura the coat in the right size. Buddy admits to Rob that he returned the coat to Nunzio, got Rob's check back and then went and bought the coat at the retail store for $500. Laura got Rob golf clubs. Peter Brocco as Emil.

=== Season 5 (1965–1966) ===
- Season 5 of The Dick Van Dyke Show consisted of 32 black-and-white half-hour episodes.

No. overall	No. in season	Title	Directed by	Written by	Original release date	Prod. code
127	1	"Coast to Coast Big Mouth"	Jerry Paris	Bill Persky and Sam Denoff	September 15, 1965	128
Laura and Millie attend a taping of the nationally broadcast "Pay as You Go!" game show. Johnny Patrick, the host, is infamous for getting his guests flustered. Millie is picked to be a contestant, but she panics. Johnny suggests that Laura take her place. Rob, Buddy, Sally and Mel are meeting in Alan's office. Ritchie calls Rob and tells him Laura will be on TV. Rob turns on the TV in Alan's office. Johnny asks Laura what Alan Brady is like and she has a lot of nice things to say about him. Alan turns off the TV and they all go to lunch. What they now didn't see is that Laura is tricked into revealing that Alan is bald. At home, Laura tells Rob what happened on the show. They both hope that Alan doesn't find out. Buddy calls and tells Rob that what Laura said made it to the newspaper. The next day at the office, Sally tells Rob she saw Laura get on an elevator. Alan did find out and is talking to Mel about it. Laura comes by and tells Alan that Rob doesn't know she's here. Laura tries to apologize and tells him he looks good without his toupee. Rob comes in and Alan says that he's glad he doesn't have the strain of keeping his baldness a secret anymore. Note: In 1997, TV Guide ranked this episode number 8 on its list of the 100 Greatest Episodes. This episode was colorized and shown on CBS-TV on December 11, 2016 and again on July 3, 2020 to mark the passing of Carl Reiner.
128	2	"A Farewell to Writing"	Jerry Paris	Fred Freeman and Lawrence J. Cohen	September 22, 1965	127
Rob and Laura receive a book written by old friend Harvey Bellman. Laura tells Millie that every time Harvey wanted to give up on the book, Rob encouraged him to keep going. Harvey writes a note saying that if Rob ever wanted to use his cabin at Lake Pushneck to write, it's available. Rob feels bad that he never finished his own book. As Rob is on his vacation anyway, he decides to work on his book. It's been three days and Rob gets distracted by anything and everything. Laura finally tells Rob to go to Harvey's cabin. Even at the cabin Rob is constantly distracted. Horace (Guy Raymond), the man that let Rob into the cabin, comes by with a load of wood. Rob tries to talk Horace into staying. Horace, thinking Rob is a little crazy, leaves quickly. Back at home, Laura wonders if it was a mistake sending Rob to the cabin. Laura goes to the cabin and learns all Rob has written was a short dedication to her for the book. Rob realizes he's no novelist.
129	3	"Uhny Uftz"	Jerry Paris	Carl Kleinschmitt and Dale McRaven	September 29, 1965	129
Rob, Buddy and Sally are having a late-night writing session for The Alan Brady Show. Mel comes in and asks Rob if he could lock up. While Buddy and Sally get coffee, Rob thinks he sees a UFO, which utters the mysterious phrase "Uhny Uftz". Buddy and Sally think that Rob just dreamt it. The next morning even Laura thinks Rob dreamt it. Rob calls a radar tracking station, but they didn't spot anything. At the train station, Rob speaks to his psychiatrist friend Dr. Phil Ridley (Ross Elliott). He convinces Rob it was just an illusion caused by fatigue. During another late night writing session, Rob tells Buddy and Sally that he'll finish up and they can go home. When he's alone, Rob gets startled by the phone ringing. Laura just wanted to know when he'd be home. Rob hears "Uhny Uftz" being repeated again. Buddy comes back because he forgot a package. At first Rob thinks Buddy was repeating the phrase. But then Buddy hears the phrase as well. They search the building and find a man named Karl (John Mylong). Karl introduces them to his assistant, Hugo (Karl Lukas). The flying saucer was a toy that they invented. Madge Blake as a lady who overhears Rob talking to Phil.
130	4	"The Ugliest Dog in the World"	Lee Philips	Bill Persky and Sam Denoff	October 6, 1965	130
Buddy, Sally and Rob are having a hard time writing jokes for this week's guest, a dog named Pally. Rob suggests they do a sketch where the ugliest dog in the world is turned into beautiful Pally. Rob gets an ugly dog from the pound and names it Horrible. Despite his allergy, Rob takes Horrible home. The next day, Mel tells them that Pally isn't on the show anymore because it bit Alan. Rob takes Horrible back to the pound. Mr. Mack (Michael Conrad), a customer at the pound, tells Rob that if the dog isn't adopted after a certain time, they are put down. Rob checks with Mr. Berkowitz (George Tyne), of the pound, and learns that's what happens. When he can't find someone to take Horrible, Rob takes the dog home. Laura suggests taking Horrible to a canine grooming salon. Rob and Laura go to the Poodle Palace. After some hesitation, snobbish owner Rex Fitzpaulding (Billy De Wolfe) accepts the challenge. Rex tells them to come back in three hours. When they get back, Horrible looks beautiful. Rex decides he wants to keep the dog. Florence Halop as Mrs. Fitzpaulding.
131	5	"No Rice at My Wedding"	Lee Philips	Jerry Belson and Garry Marshall	October 13, 1965	131
Laura reads about prominent trial lawyer Clark Rice (Van Williams) in the paper. In her mind, Laura still hopes Rob is a little jealous over Clark. Flashback to Rob in the Army at Camp Crowder. Sam Pomerantz (Allan Melvin) tells Rob it's an honor that Laura was crowned "Bivouac Baby". Laura is to be raffled off for a date. Rob's not happy about it. Laura comes by and her and Rob have an awkward conversation about her being crowned. That night Laura picks the winner and it's Corporal Clark Rice. A funny looking guy comes up and Rob thinks it's Clark. It turns out to be Humphrey Dundee (Johnny Silver), a friend of Clark's. Clark was on guard duty, but then he shows up and he is very handsome. At the end of the date, Laura reminds Clark that she has a boyfriend. Clark is attracted to Laura and asks to see her again. Laura tells Clark she had a good time and he leaves. Laura decides to see Clark again and tells Rob, who's not happy about it. After her date with Clark, Laura tells Rob she has to see Clark again. He's being shipped overseas. Rob tells Laura to make a choice and gives her an ultimatum. Clark realizes that Laura loves Rob and tells her to go to him. Bert Remsen as Heckler.
132	6	"Draw Me a Pear"	Jerry Paris	Art Baer and Ben Joelson	October 20, 1965	132
Rob reluctantly agrees to go to an evening art class with Laura. At class, teacher Valerie Ware (Ina Balin) critiques Rob's painting and encourages him to ask more of himself. Valerie suggests that Rob do a sketch of Laura. Valerie loves the sketch, but Laura isn't happy with it. At home, Rob shows his work to Millie, who was babysitting. Laura tells Millie that she thinks that Valerie was spending more time with Rob than was necessary. Rob tells Laura he had a good time in class and really liked the teacher. At the next class, Valerie again spends a lot of time with Rob. Valerie says that they will have to combine classes and will meet in the afternoon. Rob says he won't be able to as he works. At home, Laura tells Rob that she thought Valerie was falling for him. Valerie calls and is surprised when Laura answers the phone. Laura tells her they're married. Valerie wants to arrange private lessons for Rob. Rob comes home from the lesson and says he wants to quit. He doesn't want Laura to be uncomfortable, but she talks him into going. Rob discovers that Laura was right about Valerie. Jackie Joseph as Missy, Dorothea Neumann as Doris and Jody Gilbert as Agnes, art class students.
133	7	"The Great Petrie Fortune"	Jerry Paris	Ernest Chambers and Jay Burton	October 27, 1965	133
Rob and Laura attend the reading of the will left by Rob's elderly Uncle Hezekiah. Rob feels uncomfortable there because he hasn't seen Hezekiah since he was 12 years old. Leland Ferguson (Dan Tobin), the lawyer, starts the proceedings. After the others are told what they inherited, Leland has them leave the room. Rob and Laura are shown a short film of Hezekiah informing Rob that he's left him his most valuable possession, his old roll-top desk. Hezekiah then sings him a chorus of "Me and My Shadow," which is supposed to be a clue to a "treasure" Hezekiah claims is hidden in the desk. Leland tells Rob the desk will be delivered to his house that evening. After they get the desk open, Rob and Laura find a lot of worthless trinkets. Buddy and Sally come by. Rob thinks that Hezekiah is just playing a joke on him. They find a secret door in the desk that has a small lamp in it. The lamp is full of old coins. They have Mr. Harlow (Forrest Lewis), a coin expert, look at them, but there's no treasure there. After a little more searching, Rob finds what his Uncle wanted him to have, a rare picture of Abraham Lincoln. Elvia Allman as Luthuella, Herb Vigran as Alfred Reinbeck, Amzie Strickland as Rebecca, Howard Wendell as Ezra, and Tiny Brauer as Ike Balinger, people who attended the reading of the will. Note: The short film shown to Rob and Laura features Dick Van Dyke as Uncle Hezekiah.
134	8	"Odd but True"	Jerry Paris	Garry Marshall and Jerry Belson	November 3, 1965	134
Laura and Millie come home from shopping. Rob is sleeping on the couch. Freddie Helper (Peter Oliphant) connects the freckles on Rob's back with his marker. Laura and Millie catch them. They think it looks like the Liberty Bell. When they go to get a camera, Rob wakes up. Laura tells Rob about the bell and he goes to look at it in the mirror. At the office, Rob shows Buddy and Sally a picture of his back. Buddy makes jokes about it and Sally wants to see Rob's back. Millie suggests that Rob submit it to "Odd but True", a column that discusses strange things. They pay $500 for items. Rob doesn't want to do it because he'd feel like a freak. At the office, Rob learns that Millie made an appointment for him with Mr. Tetlow (James Millhollin) at "Odd but True". Buddy and Sally talk Rob into going. Rob and Laura go to the "Odd but True" office and the Receptionist (Rhoda Williams) gives Rob a form. A man there shows them a potato that's shaped like a duck. A lady (Hope Summers) claims her dog hasn't eaten in five years. Tetlow determines that some of the freckles were actually healed over scars. Ray Kellogg as Stagehand.
135	9	"Viva Petrie"	Jerry Paris	John Whedon	November 10, 1965	135
At the office, Sally tells Rob that a woman called for him, but Sally couldn't really understand her. Rob figures it was Maria, his and Laura's former maid. Maria calls back and asks Rob for a favor. Maria would like Rob to find a job for Manuel Rodriguez (Joby Baker), her matador boyfriend. Rob doesn't promise anything and will see what he can do. Back at home, Rob makes several calls, but can't find anything for Manuel. Maria calls and thanks Rob, but he doesn't know for what. Just then Manuel arrives at the house. Manuel has the misconception that his job is their live-in housekeeper. He says that he had to leave Spain and bullfighting in disgrace as a coward. He can't marry Maria until he regains his dignity. Rob can't find a way to tell Manuel they don't need him. Rob gets upset because Manuel starts other jobs before he finishes the one he was doing. Manuel offers to make a Spanish meal for dinner. Rob tells Laura that Manuel doesn't act like someone who was a bullfighter. Buddy and Sally come by for dinner. Manuel overhears Rob tell Buddy and Sally that he doesn't thinks Manuel is a bullfighter. Manuel brings out a matador outfit, which Rob tries on. Manuel uses a chair to pretend he's a bull and he does hit Rob. A Doctor comes by. Manuel confesses that he is a Mexican cook for a Spanish bullfighter.
136	10	"Go Tell the Birds and the Bees"	Jerry Paris	Rick Mittleman	November 17, 1965	136
Laura calls the office and tells Rob that Miss Reshovsky (Alberta Nelson), Ritchie's teacher, wants to see them tomorrow. It seems Ritchie has been giving his classmates lectures on the facts of life. Rob tells Buddy and Sally that he did have a talk with Ritchie, but it shouldn't be anything that would upset his teacher. At home, Laura tells Rob that Miss Reshovsky said they shouldn't talk to Ritchie until she's talked to them. The next morning, Rob and Laura go to see Miss Reshovsky and she goes to get Dr. Gormsley (Peter Hobbs). Dr. Gormsley says that Ritchie is telling the kids that babies come from a vegetable garden. The story gets even more fanciful. Rob says that's the story his father told him when he was a kid. Ritchie saw his Grandfather last week and must have been told that story. Rob decides to have a talk with Ritchie. It starts out very awkward, but Rob thinks that Ritchie finally understands. At the office, Rob tells Buddy and Sally that he really feels like a father. Laura calls and says the school called and Ritchie is still giving his lectures. They want to see Rob and Laura again. Dr. Gormsley tells them that Ritchie is now saying that parents pick out their kids at a baby supermarket. At home, Rob thinks Jerry told Ritchie that story when he drove the kids to school. Ritchie tells them that he made up the story because the kids enjoy his stories. Rob suggests a different subject for his stories.
137	11	"Body and Sol"	Jerry Paris	Carl Kleinschmitt and Dale McRaven	November 24, 1965	137
Sally comes back from lunch and tells Rob she met an old friend of his, Boom Boom Bailey (Paul Stader). Rob recalls for Buddy and Sally his days as "Pitter Patter Petrie," the Special Services' middleweight champion of Camp Crowder during his Army days. Flashback to that time. Rob had just finished his last required fight and tells his friend Sol (Allan Melvin) he's going to miss it. Bernie Stern (Michael Conrad), of the Motor Pool, tells Sol that Rob couldn't stand up to any guy from the Motor Pool. Bernie and Sol set up a fight against the Motor Pool's middleweight champ, Boom Boom Bailey. Meanwhile, Rob promises Laura he won't fight again. Sol comes by and tells Rob about the fight. Because he promised Laura, he turns the fight down. Back to the present, Rob tells Buddy and Sally that he really wanted to fight. Flashback, a lot of guys in Rob's outfit were upset with him and tease him. Captain Worwick (Ed Peck) pretty much forces Rob to fight, because the camp thinks Rob's a coward. Rob asks Laura to go to the fight and be his inspiration, but she refuses. Sol tells Rob that the betting odds are against him. Just before the fight, Laura comes by. Because she doesn't want Rob to get hurt, she tells him to take a dive. During the fight, Rob is not doing well. Now even Sol tells Rob to take a dive. Rob eventually knocks Boom Boom out. Back to the present, Buddy and Sally don't believe Rob knocked Boom Boom out. Rob says he lost the fight because he hit Boom Boom in his appendix, which is below the belt. Garry Marshall as the Referee.
138	12	"See Rob Write, Write Rob Write"	Jerry Paris	Lawrence J. Cohen and Fred Freeman	December 8, 1965	138
Laura has brought home several fantasy illustrations. They were drawn by Charlie, the 17 year old son of Laura's butcher. Rob is very impressed with them. Laura thinks Rob should show them to his friend, Ollie Wheelright (John McGiver), a children's book publisher. She also believes that the drawings might sell more easily if there was a story with them. Laura says she will write a story under the pen name Samantha Q. Wiggins. Rob's afraid that Laura will start the story, but he'll wind up having to finish it. Rob is surprised when Laura finishes the story in two hours. Rob likes her story, but thinks there are a few spots that need some editing. He offers to do it. Rob is working on the story at the office. Rob invites Buddy and Sally over for dinner the next night so they can finish their sketch then. Laura is not happy because Rob changed her story entirely. And he used words that little kids wouldn't understand. The next night Buddy and Sally are over and are having a hard time with the sketch. Rob reads them both stories to see which one they like better. Buddy and Sally liked Laura's story better. Sally suggests they give both stories to Ollie and let him pick. Rob and Laura go to see Ollie. Ollie liked Laura's story better. He can't use it though because it's a take off of another author's story. However, Ollie will publish the drawings.
139	13	"You're Under Arrest"	Jerry Paris	Joseph C. Cavella	December 15, 1965	139
Rob returns home late after a fight with Laura. He had been at a drive in movie. Before coming in the house, Rob gets a black eye falling on Jerry and Millie's lawn jockey. Laura answers the phone and it is the police. They called searching for someone who drove a car matching Rob's car's license plate number. Rob thinks Millie and Jerry may have called the police because he cut through their driveway and knocked over some garbage cans. The police said they'd call back if they needed more information. The next day Millie tells Laura they didn't call the police. At the office, Buddy and Sally ask Rob about his black eye. The police call and Rob learns that a person with his license plate allegedly assaulted an elderly woman at a bar. At the police station Rob speaks with Detective Cox (Sandy Kenyon) and Detective Norton (Phillip Pine). Rob tries to explain where he was and how he got the black eye, but he winds up sounding guilty. Back at home, Laura thinks Rob should get a lawyer. The police arrive and Rob and Laura go with them. At the police station Rob is put in a line up. Mrs. Fieldhouse (Bella Bruck), the victim, positively identifies him as one of her attackers. Buddy, Sally and the bartender are able to prove Rob's innocence. Johnny Silver as Taxey. Jerry Paris as Blake (voice). Tiny Brauer as Man.
140	14	"Fifty-Two, Forty-Five or Work"	Jerry Paris	Rick Mittleman	December 29, 1965	140
Mel tells Rob, Buddy and Sally that Alan is going into summer reruns, so they have the time off. Rob remembers when the same thing happened nine years ago. Flashback to that time. Mel tells them they will have the summer off. Buddy and Sally have other temporary writing jobs they can do. Rob has no job, a new house, no furniture and a baby on the way. Back at home Rob tells Laura the bad news, but she's not that concerned. She suggests borrowing money from her folks, but Rob is against that. Laura figures Rob could collect unemployment insurance. At the unemployment office, Rob runs into Herbie Finkel (Jerry Hausner), who was a character on Alan's show a few weeks back. Dawn McCracken (Reta Shaw), a clerk there, tells Rob she'll try and get him another writing job. Buddy and Sally bring Laura a folding table with chairs. Rob comes home and Laura tells him that Miss McCracken called. Buddy and Sally wonder who McCracken is. Rob calls Dawn and she says that she got him a job writing for a TV tube company. Rob meets with Mr. Brumley (Dabbs Greer) from the TV tube company. Just as Rob starts the job, a Joe Galardi (James Frawley) tells him they are all going on strike. A phone call from Mel solves Rob's problems. Back to the present. Rob, Buddy and Sally discuss what they'll do with their time off.
141	15	"Who Stole My Watch?"	Jerry Paris	Joseph Bonaduce	January 5, 1966	141
Laura throws Rob a surprise birthday party. Millie, Jerry, Buddy, Sally and Mel are there. Laura gave Rob an expensive watch. After the party, Rob can't find the watch. Rob and Laura search the house but come up with nothing. They then think that Jerry and Millie took it as a joke. After calling Jerry and him denying it, Rob thinks Buddy did it as a joke. The next morning at the office, Buddy says he didn't take the watch. Rob tries to convince them that he doesn't think one of his friends stole it. Rob calls his insurance company. Back at home, Rob and Laura wonder if one of their friends is a kleptomaniac. Mr. Evans (Milton Frome), from the insurance company, comes by. Evans implies that the watch isn't missing and they just want to make a claim to get the money. At the office, Buddy, Sally and Mel come in very upset. Apparently Evans went to see each of them and had a lot of accusatory questions. Millie tells Laura that Evans came to see her and Jerry. Rob and Laura think they should have a "I'm Sorry" party. Laura calls everyone and they all turn her down. Evans calls Rob saying they found the watch and Laura's jewelry case. Turns out it was a real crook that broke into the house during the party.
142	16	"I Do Not Choose to Run"	Jerry Paris	Dale McRaven and Carl Kleinschmitt	January 19, 1966	143
Rob is at a village meeting. Chairman John Gerber (Howard Wendell) introduces Rob. He speaks out against the development of a new shopping center in the location of a park. The next day Rob is asked to run for city councilman by his friend Doug (George Tyne) and businessman Mr. Howard (Philip Ober). Rob is surprised and flattered. They tell Rob to think about it and come to a planning meeting tomorrow night. At the office, Buddy is worried there will be more work for them if Rob's busy being a councilman. That night at the meeting, Doug introduces Rob to Bill Schermerhorn (Arte Johnson), the campaign manager. Rob soon finds his life will be under their complete management. Rob comes home late. Laura says that for the past three hours she's been answering the phone. Everyone is calling wanting something from Rob if he's elected. Rob tells Laura all the things that will be expected of him on the campaign trail. A Lionel Sims (Peter Brocco) comes by and asks Rob if he likes animals. Lionel says that his neighbor is complaining about all his pets. Rob has reasons he wants to run and also reasons not to. At the office, Rob gets a call from Alan, who says he'll be doing several specials. Now there will be a lot more work. Rob tells Doug and the others he'll run. Note: Part 1 of 2. This plot is similar to episode 197 of The Andy Griffith Show, and episode 72 of The Partridge Family show.
143	17	"The Making of a Councilman"	Jerry Paris	Carl Kleinschmitt and Dale McRaven	January 26, 1966	144
Rob is rehearsing for his first speaking engagement at the Ladies Club. Sally tells him he needs to loosen up and relax. Doug Miller comes by. He tells Rob that something came up and he won't be able to join him. At the Ladies Club, Mrs. Birdwell introduces Rob to his opponent, Lincoln Goodheart (Wally Cox). Lincoln is a short fellow and has a nasal voice. Rob and Lincoln have an awkward conversation. Rob meets Lincoln's wife Martha, who is very active in politics. When the other ladies arrive, they all crowd around Rob. At home, Laura tells Rob that she talked to Lincoln and he's very knowledgeable about local issues. Rob's concerned because he really isn't familiar with the issues. Doug has set up a question period with Rob and Lincoln and brings in the reporters. Rob doesn't do well and Lincoln is clearly more well-informed. Back at home, Laura, Buddy and Sally try to cheer up Rob. Rob tells Doug that he wants to withdraw from the race. He doesn't want to win because he's charming. Doug says that Lincoln knows facts and figures, but Rob knows people. Doug gets Rob to stay in the race. It's election day and despite it being close, Rob wins. Lorna Thayer as Samantha Meriweather, a reporter. Marilyn Hare as Third Lady. Note: Part 2 of 2
144	18	"The Curse of the Petrie People"	Jerry Paris	Dale McRaven and Carl Kleinschmitt	February 2, 1966	145
Rob's parents Sam (Tom Tully) and Clara (Isabel Randolph) want Rob to have a party and invite friends. They will have a surprise. Buddy, Sally and Millie are over. Sam and Clara arrive. After dinner Sam reveals the surprise. Clara gives Laura a Petrie family heirloom. It's a large, garish gold brooch in the shape of the United States. Sam says that there's a jewel for each city where a male member of the family was born. Sam mentions that there's a family curse. If a jewel in the brooch falls out, that family member dies. Clara says there is no curse. After the party Laura accidentally drops the brooch in the garbage disposal. Rob says his mother wants to take them to dinner Saturday night and she wants Laura to wear the brooch. Laura doesn't tell Rob what happened. Laura and Millie go to see Mr. Mark (Leon Belasco), the jeweler. She wants to have the brooch repaired before anyone notices. Laura needs to find out where the jewels go. Rob does find out about the brooch. It's Saturday night and Mr. Mark delivers the brooch right before Sam and Clara arrive. Clara notices the jewels are in the wrong places. Clara feels bad that Laura went to the trouble to have the ugly brooch repaired. Sam mentions there are earrings of Hawaii and Alaska.
145	19	"The Bottom of Mel Cooley's Heart"	Jerry Paris	John Whedon	February 9, 1966	146
Rob and Buddy witness Alan yell at Mel in front of the sponsor and cast during rehearsal. Buddy actually felt sorry for Mel. Mel had made a small mistake that caused Alan to walk into a sketch with the wrong costume on. They tell Sally what happened. Mel comes by the office and would like to talk to Rob. At home, Rob tells Laura that Mel thanked him for standing up for him. Alan calls Rob asking him about another producer. At the office, Rob tells Buddy and Sally they need to build up Mel's ego. They take Mel to lunch and talk him into standing up to Alan. Mel is promptly fired. Rob, Sally and Buddy want to figure out how they can help Mel get his job back. Laura tells Rob he should talk to Alan. It takes some doing but Rob, Buddy and Sally convince Alan that Mel's annoying traits are actually his positives. Arthur Tovey as Restaurant Patron. Note: This episode was colorized and aired on CBS on May 21, 2021.
146	20	"Remember the Alimony"	Jerry Paris	Dale McRaven and Carl Kleinschmitt	February 16, 1966	147
Buddy and Sally are over for dinner. Ritchie comes in wearing a sombrero and holding a document. Rob grabs the document away from Ritchie. Rob tells Buddy and Sally that it's his and Laura's divorce papers. Rob explains that it was three months after they were married and he was stationed in a small Texas border town. Flashback to that time. Laura wants to do something that doesn't involve Rob's Army friends, Sol and Bernie. They are about to go for a walk when Sol and Bernie show up. They play cards for a while and then they leave. Rob and Laura decide to take a romantic getaway across the border into El Diablo, Mexico. At the hotel, Rob and Laura speak to Gonzales (Don Diamond), the Manager. Gonzales gives them separate rooms. They learn that El Diablo was the place were people went to get a quick and cheap divorce. Rob is not impressed with the room and there's no air conditioning. After dinner Rob winds up dancing the entire evening with a flamenco dancer named Maxine, who is the entertainment. Laura is not happy. The next day they go to a bullfight which Laura didn't enjoy. Back at the hotel Sol and Bernie show up. During an argument in the lobby, Rob and Laura inadvertently tell their story to Juan (Bernie Kopell), the lawyer who provides divorces. Juan lets them keep the divorce papers as a souvenir. José Nieto as a Mariachio.
147	21	"Dear Sally Rogers"	Richard Erdman	Ronald Axe	February 23, 1966	148
Sally is going on The Stevie Parsons Show once again. Because she's been on so many times, she doesn't know what she'll do this time. Sally gets a call from Herman Glimscher (Bill Idelson) wanting to know if their date for tonight is still on. Sally says she can't as she'll be on TV. Sally decides to make a gag request for a husband on the show. Rob and Laura are watching Sally on TV. Rob thinks Sally will get a lot of letters from every screwball around. Sally winds up getting quite a few letters and many are funny. There is one very sincere letter that is signed with a number. Herman comes by the office and things do not go well. Stevie (Richard Schaal) asks Rob to pick one of those letters without Sally's knowledge. Stevie plans to contact the man and introduce him to Sally live on the air. At first Rob doesn't know if he will go along with the stunt. He does decide to do it and gives Stevie the sincere letter. Sally is on Stevie's show reading the funny letters. Stevie then brings out Rob and they tell Sally what's going on. Everyone is surprised when they learn it's Herman that wrote the letter. Bert Remsen as Announcer (voice). Song: Bill Idelson sings "Old Folks at Home".
148	22	"Buddy Sorrell: Man and Boy"	Richard Erdman	Ben Joelson and Art Baer	March 2, 1966	149
Buddy comes up with excuses to leave early from work. He's also making and getting unusual phone calls at the office. Rob tells Sally the last time Buddy acted that way, he left his wife briefly. Back at home, because of something Sally said, Rob tells Laura that Buddy may be seeing a psychiatrist. At the office, Buddy starts to tell Rob and Sally something, but then makes an excuse to leave. After a call to Pickles, Rob begins to suspect Buddy is having an affair. At the office, Sally tells Rob that a woman just called for Buddy. At her house, Buddy tells Dorothy (Pippa Scott) that he's tired of sneaking around. Dorothy thinks Buddy should tell everyone. He thinks he should forget the whole thing. Dorothy says that the two of them bumping into each other was no accident. Dorothy's husband Leon (Ed Peck) comes home. Turns out Leon is a Rabbi and Buddy is preparing for his bar mitzvah. Rob tries talking to Buddy. Buddy misunderstands and at first thinks it's Jerry Helper that's seeing another woman. Then Buddy thinks it's Rob. Buddy explains that he's preparing for his bar mitzvah. He couldn't do it when he was young because he had to work. He's doing it now for his mother.
149	23	"Bad Reception in Albany"	Jerry Paris	Garry Marshall and Jerry Belson	March 9, 1966	142
Rob and Laura are at an Albany hotel where Laura's cousin Edabeth is getting married. Rob is an usher and Laura the matron of honor. Alan calls to remind Rob that he needs to watch a fashion show on TV to find the right girl to be Alan's partner. Laura leaves and Rob doesn't remember the name of the church. The room's TV stops working and Rob gets Forrest Gilly (Tom D'Andrea), the TV repairman, to look at it. Rob hopes to find another TV, but learns the hotel is full of Seal lodge-members. Rob talks to the Chambermaid (Bella Bruck) and she suggests going to the hotel bar. Rob asks the Bartender (Bert Remsen) if he could watch the fashion show. The Bartender says Rob needs to ask the other guests. Sam (Johnny Haymer) and Fred (Joseph Mell) want to watch the fights. Rob hears the room across from his has the TV on to the show. Sugar Henderson (Chanin Hale) lets him watch the show. At the wedding Laura is embarrassed when Rob shows up late and wearing a suit with fur lapels. Rob explains that he was watching the show in Sugar's room. Sugar wants to audition for Rob. Her husband Wendell (Robert Nichols) comes back, and thinking the worst, ruins Rob's tux. Rob then has to wear a suit from Wendell. Tiny Brauer as Lou. George Holmes as Minister.
150	24	"Talk to the Snail"	Jerry Paris	Jerry Belson and Garry Marshall	March 16, 1966	151
Rob, Sally and Buddy have to dig through building trash containers for a lost script. Sally wants to leave because she has a date with a new guy, Doug Bedlork (Henry Gibson). Rob finds a network memo to Alan Brady saying he must fire one writer. He doesn't say anything to Buddy or Sally. Sally finds the script. Rob shows Laura the memo. She convinces Rob to have Buddy and Sally come over and talk to them. Sally brings Doug with her. Rob shows them the memo. Sally notices it was dated three days ago and Alan hasn't said anything yet. The next day at the office Rob says he can't fire either one. Rather than be split up, they decide to seek a new job together. As it's mid-season, the only job open is working for ventriloquist Claude Wilbur's (Paul Winchell) show. The show features puppets, the star puppet being Jellybean the Snail. Rob goes to see Claude and Jellybean. Claude offers more money than Alan is paying. Claude needs an answer by tomorrow. The next day at the office, Alan and Mel come by. Alan is upset because he heard about Rob going to see Claude. Rob shows Alan the memo. Turns out that Alan never intended to fire anyone. He gets one of those memos every month.
151	25	"A Day in the Life of Alan Brady"	Jerry Paris	Joseph Bonaduce	April 6, 1966	152
Rob is surprised to see the office completely made over. Alan is making a television documentary on his life and wants everything to look good. Buddy says that the rest of Alan's offices were also made over. Mel comes by and tells them not to sit on anything as it's rented. The meeting is postponed until tomorrow and it will be on a yacht Alan rented. Mel asks Rob if Alan could be filmed having coffee at Rob's house Friday night. Alan wants to show that he mingles with the "little people." Rob calls Laura and she reminds him that they were having an anniversary party for the Helpers on that night. Alan tells Rob he'll go to the anniversary party. At home, Millie comes by. She was at first going to invite a lot of people to the party, but then she decided to keep it small. Rob tells Millie about Alan and the film crew. Now Millie wants to invite a lot of people. The next day Rob tells Millie that Alan wants no more than twelve people at the party. It's the night of the party and Rob tells everyone to just act natural. Millie's cousin Blanche (Joyce Jameson) starts flirting with Rob. Blanche's jealous lush of a husband Hi starts drinking. Alan arrives and the guests act uninterested. Alan wants to redo the scene with everyone being excited. Blanche flirts with Alan and Hi punches him in the side. Alan makes the best of it and they continue filming. Eddie Paskey as Party Guest.
152	26	"Obnoxious, Offensive, Egomaniac, Etc."	Jerry Paris	Carl Kleinschmitt and Dale McRaven	April 13, 1966	153
It's late and Rob, Laura, Buddy and Sally are about to leave the office to see a play. Alan had given them the tickets. Laura is looking at this weeks script and sees a lot of insults about Alan. They explain that they always ink out the insults on the copy they give to Alan. Sally realizes that they forgot to ink out the insults. They figure Alan hasn't seen it yet as they haven't been fired. Rob checks and Alan's office is locked. Rob calls Mac the night watchman (Forrest Lewis). Mac says he has orders to not let anyone in Alan's office. They go to see if they can break into the office. Mac comes by and catches them. Mac does let them into the secretary's office. It takes some doing, but Rob gets into Alan's office. Laura finds the key. Mel comes by and realizes he inadvertently sent to script to Alan's house. Now the gang, including Mel, head for Alan's house. Laura finds the key and they get into the house. They find Alan asleep holding the script. Alan has already read the script. However, Mel has a way to prevent them all from getting fired and it involves a little blackmail.
153	27	"The Man from My Uncle"	Jerry Paris	Garry Marshall and Jerry Belson	April 20, 1966	154
Rob is thrilled to have a three day weekend. Mr. Phillips (Biff Elliot), a federal agent, comes by the house. Rob and Laura wonder if they did something wrong. Turns out that Phillips would like to use their house to watch neighbor Mr. Wendell Gerard (Steven Geray). It's actually Wendell's nephew that they're interested in. The nephew was deported three years ago for gambling. The nephew got back in the country and he may go to Wendell's house. Laura reluctantly agrees to do it, but she would like to see Mr. Phillips' credentials. Agent Harry Bond (Godfrey Cambridge) is sent and he's dressed as a TV repairman. Wanting to get involved, Rob keeps getting in Harry's way. Laura would like to get out of the house, but Rob wants to stay in case something happens. Harry tells Rob that his toothache is getting worse and his replacement is due in an hour. Rob offers to watch the Gerard house while Harry rests a little. Rob says that Gerard has left his house and he's now at Rob's front door. Gerard tells Rob his privacy has been invaded. His nephew is at the house and he had a gun, which Gerard gives to Rob. Harry takes Gerard back to his house and Rob follows.
154	28	"You Ought to Be in Pictures"	Jerry Paris	Jack Winter	April 27, 1966	155
Sally tells Rob that Leslie Merkle (Michael Constantine) called. Leslie is an old army buddy of Rob's. Leslie now makes low budget movies. Rob calls Leslie and learns that he wants Rob to be the lead in his latest movie. At home, Rob tells Laura about the movie and she thinks he needs to find out more about it. Rob is to meet Leslie for lunch. The headwaiter seats him at a table with a very attractive woman. The woman only speaks Italian. Leslie shows up and tells Rob he'll be working with the woman, Lucianna Mazetta. When Rob learns he's to do a love scene with Lucianna, he tries to come up with excuses not to be in the film. Rob also agreed to punch up the script a little. At the office, Buddy and Sally are looking at a picture of Lucianna in a very skimpy bathing suit. Rob shows Laura the picture. Laura goes with Rob to the filming and she meets Lucianna. Rob is having a hard time playing his part. Rob tells Leslie he thinks it's because Laura is there. Rob awkwardly asks Laura to leave. But, even with Laura gone, Rob's acting is horrible.
155	29	"Love Thy Other Neighbor"	Jerry Paris	Dale McRaven and Carl Kleinschmitt	May 4, 1966	156
Laura's new neighbor is an old grammar school chum, Mary Jane Staggs. Laura and Mary Jane reminisce about those days. Millie comes by. She tries to join the conversation, but feels left out. Millie tries to tell Jerry that Mary Jane is breaking up her friendship with Laura, but Jerry has a patient and is busy. Rob comes home and tells Laura that Alan gave him four free tickets to a new Broadway musical. Laura suggests asking Jerry and Millie. Rob reminds her that Jerry hates musicals. Fred Staggs (Joby Baker) comes by. Rob invites him and Mary Jane to the musical. Jerry goes to Rob's house to invite him, Laura and the Staggs to dinner Friday night. Jerry learns that they are going to the musical that night. It costs him, but Rob is able to buy two more tickets to the show. Rob also finds something that Jerry and Fred have in common. Laura gets Millie and Mary Jane together. But, now Rob and Laura feel left out. The Petries and the Helpers realize that their old friendship will never end.
156	30	"Long Night's Journey into Day"	Jerry Paris	Jerry Belson and Garry Marshall	May 11, 1966	150
The Petries and the Helpers are going on a fishing trip. Laura has a cold and will stay home. Millie gives Laura an alarm to use if a burglar gets in the house. Later, Laura hears some strange noises. The phone rings and there's no one on the other end. The phone rings again, but this time it's Rob. He is just checking in and gives her the number of where they'll be. Artie comes by to deliver Laura's prescription. Millie returns to keep Laura company. Laura can't hear Millie calling for her because she is in the shower. Laura gets frightened when Millie finds her. Laura tells her about the noises. After they go to bed, they hear a door opening and then some creaking. Millie remembers she never closed the front door when she came in. Meanwhile at the cabin, Rob is coming down with a cold. He tries calling home, but the line is busy. Rob decides to go home. Laura and Millie have all the lights on in the house. The power suddenly goes out. They panic and hide in the garage. Rob comes in the house and they panic even more. They finally realize it's Rob.
157	31	"The Gunslinger"	Jerry Paris	Bill Persky and Sam Denoff	May 25, 1966	158
Rob is in Jerry's dentist chair about to have a wisdom tooth pulled. While Rob is under anesthesia, he dreams of being a sheriff in a western town. Buddy is his deputy and Sally runs the saloon. Rob hears from Killer Cooley that "Big Bad Brady" is coming to town and wants to see a stage show. Brady vows to kill anyone associated with the show if he doesn't like it. If the show doesn't go on, he'll just kill the sheriff. Rob tells Laura about Brady and the show. Laura says they've run before, they can run again. Rob goes to Sally's saloon. Rob can't convince the cowboys of the town to perform. Rob must decide whether to face Big Bad Brady or go on the run. Laura tells Millie that she'll sing and dance on the stage. A Gun Salesman (Allan Melvin) comes to the jailhouse, but Rob doesn't buy anything. Brady shows up at the saloon and Rob says there won't be a show. Just then Laura is on the stage and starts to perform. But, when that doesn't work, Rob has to shoot it out with Brady. Without knowing what he's doing, Rob does kill Brady. Rob comes out of the anesthesia. Jerry Belson as Poker Player. Sam Denoff as Cowboy. Bill Persky as Cowboy. Song: Mary sings "I Don't Care". Note: Dick Van Dyke's children Barry and Stacy, along with Garry Marshall and other writers from the show and their families, appear as background characters in this episode. This episode was the last episode of the series to be filmed.
158	32	"The Last Chapter"	Jerry Paris and John Rich	Carl Reiner, Bill Persky and Sam Denoff	June 1, 1966	157
In the series finale, after five years of work, Rob finishes his first book called Untitled: A Series of Terribly Important Events in the Fairly Unimportant Life of Robert S. Petrie. As Laura starts reading, she is excited to learn that the book is the story of their life from marriage proposal to a point shortly after Ritchie's birth. Laura tells Rob that she loves the book. Rob sent the manuscript to a publisher and wonders what the publisher thought. Later, Jerry and Millie are over. Rob called Laura and told her he had a surprise for her. He's bringing Alan and the gang over for a party. After they arrive, Rob says that the publisher hated the book. Alan decided to buy the rights to the manuscript and turn it into a TV series with him as the star. Archive footage with Dabbs Greer as Chaplain. Herbie Faye as Vendor. Tiny Brauer as Cabbie. Greg Morris as Mr. Peters. Note: The series finale features clips from previous episodes: Season 2's "The Attempted Marriage", Season 1's "Where Did I Come From", and Season 3's "That's My Boy?!".
