= List of magicians in film =

This article lists magician characters depicted on film, both real and fictional.

== Real-life magicians ==
Magician	Film	Year
Ehrich Weiss	The Master Mystery	1918
Dante the Magician	A-Haunting We Will Go	1942
Dante the Magician	Bunco Squad	1950
David Copperfield	Terror Train	1980
Penn & Teller	Penn & Teller Get Killed	1989
Norm Nielsen	Bobby Deerfield	1977
Ricky Jay	House of Games	1987
Gaeton Bloom	Henry & June	1990
John Scarne's hands	The Sting	1973
John Bundy	Morning Glory	2010

== Fictional magicians ==
Actor	Film	Year
Orson Welles	Casino Royale	1967
Orson Welles	Follow the Boys	1944
Stephen Glenn "Steve" Martin	Leap of Faith	1992
Jerry Lewis	The Geisha Boy	1958
Vincent Price	The Mad Magician	1954
Woody Allen	Scoop	2006
Edward Norton	The Illusionist	2006
Hugh Jackman	The Prestige	2006
Christian Bale	The Prestige	2006

== See also ==
- Magic (illusion)
- List of magicians
