= Leon Rausch =

American musician (1927–2019)

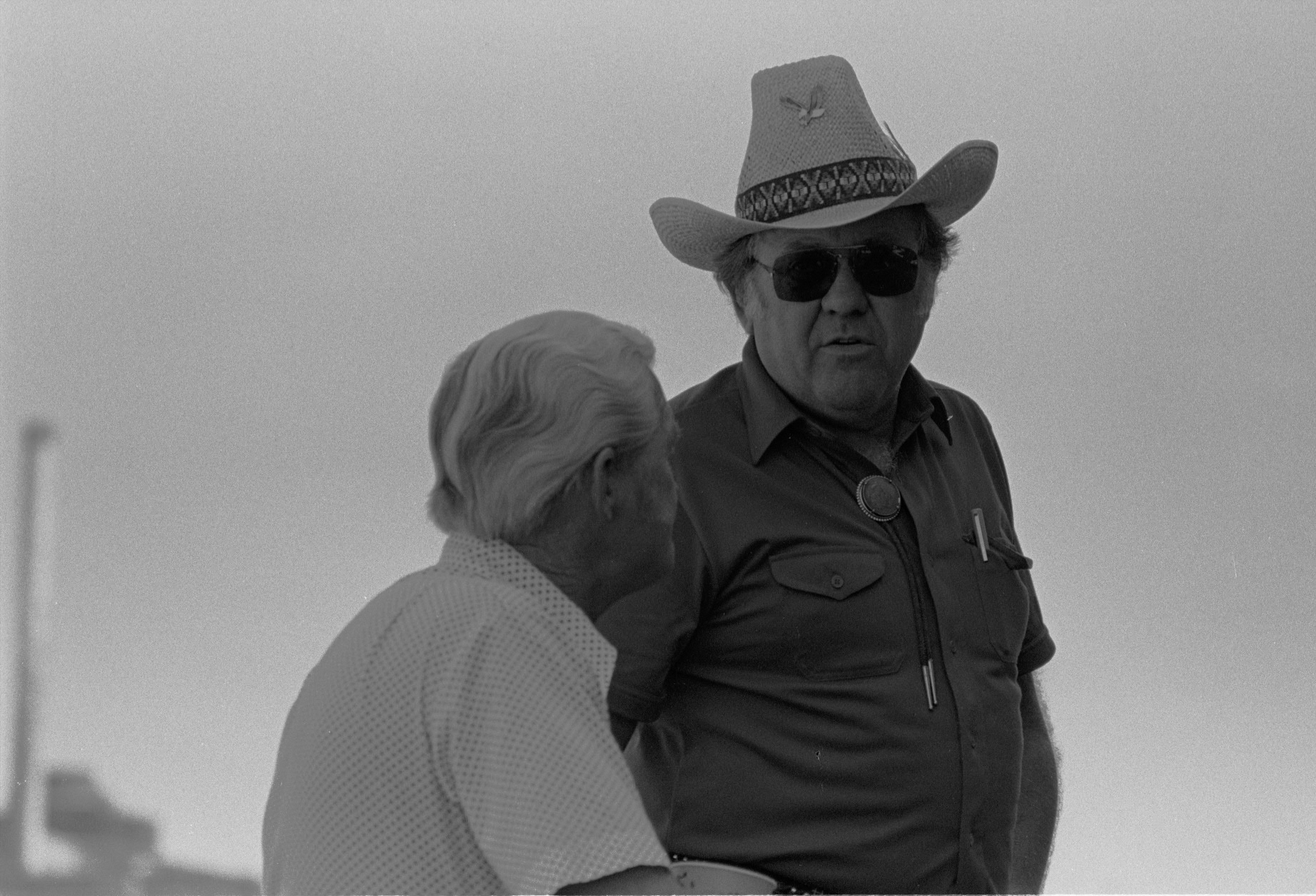
Leon Rausch off-stage at the Pioneer Days festival in Fort Worth, Texas, 1981.

Edgar Leon Rausch (October 2, 1927 – May 14, 2019) was "the voice" of "Bob Wills and his Texas Playboys".

Rausch was born in Billings, Missouri. He was lead vocalist from 1958 until the early 60s when he created his own band "The New Texas Playboys". In 1973, Wills asked Rausch to rejoin the Texas Playboys to record his final album For the Last Time.

After Wills died in 1975, Rausch and the original Texas Playboys continued to record and tour until the band played the final concert in 1986. Rausch performed each year at the Bob Wills day festival the last weekend of April in Turkey, Texas at the Bob Wills community center. The music of The Texas Playboys is "Western Swing."

In 2011, the Texas Legislature adopted a resolution designating western swing as the official "State Music of Texas". Rausch made a memorable appearance as a band singer in the 1998 Stephen Frears film The Hi-Lo Country, in a scene featuring one of the film's highlights — Don Walser's rendition of "I'll Hold You in My Heart."

Rausch died on May 14, 2019, in Fort Worth, Texas. He was 91.
