= The Terror (1963 film) =

1963 independent horror film by Roger Corman

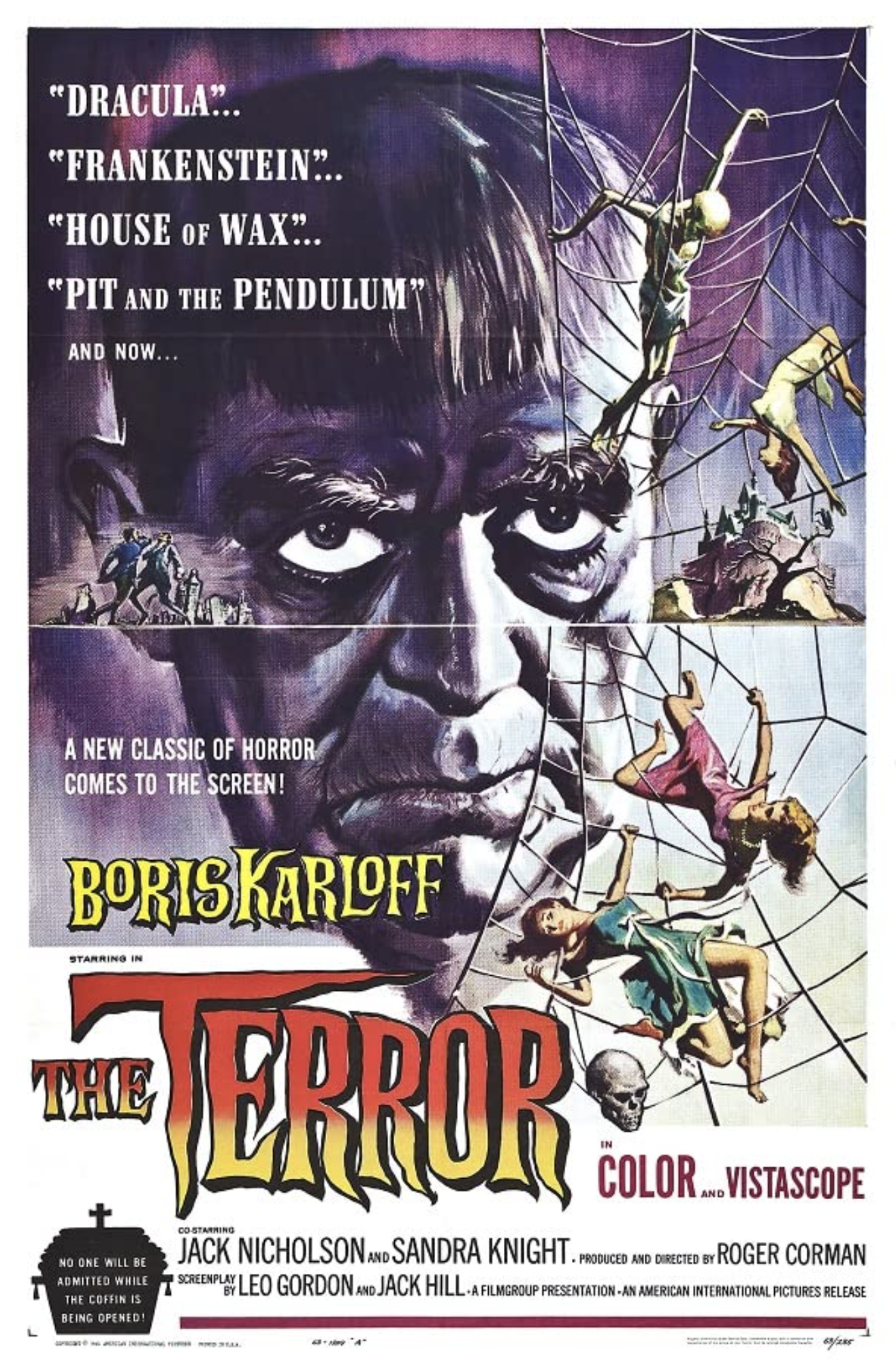
- Theatrical release poster by Reynold Brown
- Directed by: Roger Corman (Note: Only Boris Karloff’s scenes); Francis Ford Coppola (Note: Uncredited; Days 1-4); Jack Hale (Note: Uncredited; Day 5); Monte Hellman (Note: Uncredited; Days 6-11); Dennis Jakob (Note: Uncredited; Day 12); Jack Nicholson (Note: Uncredited; Day 13); Jack Hill (Note: Uncredited; Additional scenes)
- Written by: Leo Gordon; Jack Hill; Roger Corman (Note: uncredited)
- Produced by: Roger Corman
- Starring: Boris Karloff; Jack Nicholson; Sandra Knight
- Cinematography: John Mathew Nickolaus, Jr.; Floyd Crosby (Note: Uncredited; Additional scenes shot by); Conrad Hall (Note: Uncredited; Additional scenes shot by)
- Edited by: Stuart O'Brien
- Music by: Ronald Stein; Les Baxter (Note: uncredited)
- Production company: The Filmgroup
- Distributed by: American International Pictures
- Release date: June 17, 1963
- Running time: 81 minutes
- Country: United States
- Language: English
- Budget: $800,000
- Box office: 9,915 admissions (France; 1991)

The Terror is a 1963 American horror film produced and directed by Roger Corman. It stars Boris Karloff, Jack Nicholson, and Sandra Knight. It is about a Napoleonic French officer (Nicholson) who stumbles upon a castle occupied by a reclusive baron (Karloff) and is seduced by a woman who is also a shapeshifting demon.

The film is sometimes linked to Corman's Poe cycle, a series of movies based on the works of Edgar Allan Poe; however, The Terror is not based on any text written by Poe but relies on the Poe theme of a deceased wife who continues to haunt the husband, such as in "Ligeia" and "Morella", which were part of the Cycle.

The Terror has become infamous because of the circumstances under which it was made, including its chaotic production and disjointed narrative, that all of Boris Karloff's scenes were shot in two days, the long time it took to complete, the number of people who worked on it that became famous, and the part the film played in the financing and production of Targets (1968), directed by Peter Bogdanovich and starring Karloff.

Corman wrote in his memoirs that The Terror "began as a challenge: to shoot most of a gothic film in two days using left-over sets from The Raven. It turned into the longest production of my career – an ordeal that required five directors and nine months to complete. But like Little Shop [of Horrors], it's a classic story of how to make a film out of nothing."

The Terror was produced by Corman's independent production company The Filmgroup and distributed by American International Pictures on June 17, 1963. It is in the public domain, since there is no copyright notice in the credits.

== Plot ==
Full movie

In 1806, André Duvalier, a French soldier lost in the Confederation of the Rhine, is saved by Helene, a young woman who bears a resemblance to Ilsa von Leppe, the late wife of Baron von Leppe who had died 20 years earlier. André sets out to investigate Helene's true identity and learns the Baron's darkest secret: after he found Ilsa with another man, the Baron killed his wife while his servant killed her lover.

Over the preceding two years, the Baron has been tormented by Ilsa's ghost, who has besought him to kill himself so that they can be together forever. After much hesitation, the Baron decides to do so and atone for his crimes. Unbeknownst to him, Ilsa's ghost is being commanded to haunt him by a peasant witch named Katrina.

After preventing the Baron from killing himself, André and Stefan, the Baron's majordomo, capture Katrina and force her into compliance. Katrina reveals herself to be the mother of a man named Eric, who she believes was killed by the Baron 20 years earlier. She hopes to avenge Eric's death by damning the Baron's soul to Hell. Stefan reveals that it was the Baron who had died, not Eric, and that Eric felt so guilty about it that he took the Baron's place (thus explaining why the Baron had never left the castle in 20 years). Over the years, Eric has convinced himself that he is truly Baron von Leppe.

Realizing her error too late, Katrina goes with André and Stefan to stop Eric from flooding the castle crypt. Katrina's deal with the Devil, however, makes her unable to walk on consecrated ground and she ends up burning to death after being struck by lightning.

At the von Leppe castle, Eric floods the crypt as Ilsa's ghost attempts to kill him and Stefan struggles to stop her. By the time André gains access to the crypt, it is already starting to cave in and he is only able to save Helene. The two share a moment outside the castle before Helene rots away into a skeleton.

== Cast ==
- Boris Karloff as Baron Victor Frederick "Eric" Von Leppe, a corrupt aristocratic man who murdered the baron and his wife and poses as the baron of an abandoned castle.
- Jack Nicholson as André Duvalier, a soldier of Napoleon's army who finds himself lost after fleeing his men during battle.
- Dick Miller as Stefan, the original Baron's trustful servant who now serves the impostor.
- Sandra Knight as Helene / Baroness Ilsa Von Leppe, the shapeshifting demon of the witch who poses as the baron's deceased wife.
- Dorothy Neumann as Katrina The Witch, a peasant woman and the mother of Eric who was driven out of the village for heresy and witchcraft.
- Jonathan Haze as Gustaf, a lost village man who became the mentally ill servant of the witch.

== Boris Karloff scenes ==
=== Development ===
Roger Corman had enjoyed considerable success in the early 1960s producing and directing films based on the stories of Edgar Allan Poe for AIP: The House of Usher, The Pit and the Pendulum, The Premature Burial, Tales of Terror and The Raven, as well as the Poe-influenced Tower of London. Corman wrote in his memoirs that he was inspired to make The Terror because "I was getting so familiar with the standard elements of Poe's material – or at least our adaptations – that I tried to out-Poe himself and create a Gothic tale from scratch."

Corman was making The Raven (1963) featuring sets built by Daniel Haller. The weekend before filming was scheduled to end, Corman intended to play tennis with a friend but the game was rained out. Corman came up with the idea of shooting footage of a movie star on the sets of The Raven over two days, which could then be used as the basis of another movie.

Corman contacted Leo Gordon, an actor and writer who had written several films for the director, including The Cry Baby Killer and The Wasp Woman, and asked him if he had a script with a castle in it. Gordon did not but went over to Corman's house for a "brainstorming" session. Corman asked Gordon for a 60-page script written by the following weekend which could be shot over two days. Corman says his only other requirement was that the script finish with a flood, as several Poe pictures had finished with a fire sequence, and he wanted to do something new.

Corman reportedly paid Gordon $1,600 for the script. According to Dick Miller's account of making The Terror, Corman "called Chuck Griffith and said, "Write me a bunch of scenes for Boris Karloff and this castle." Chuck said, "What's the story?" Roger said, "No story, just a lot of castle, you know, in and out of doors, very mysterioso." And that's exactly what he did."

The main role in Gordon's script was that of the Baron, which was devised to be played by a star. All of Corman's Poe films except The Premature Burial had starred Vincent Price but that actor was unavailable, so Corman made a deal with Boris Karloff, who had been in The Raven, to be available for two days' filming for a small amount of money, plus a deferred payment of $15,000 that would be paid if the film earned more than $150,000. (Corman says he offered Karloff 10% of the profits above "a certain amount.")

Gordon's script had three other characters, two male and one female. Corman hired Jack Nicholson and Dick Miller, with whom he had worked several times previously, to play the other male roles. Nicholson suggested his then-wife Sandra Knight for the female role and Corman agreed. (It would be the only time Nicholson and Knight would act together in a film.) The plan was to shoot 60 pages of script over two days, then shoot the rest at a later date when the rest of the script was completed and other sets were available.

=== Shooting ===
The first two days of filming on The Terror took place on the weekend after The Raven finished on a Friday. Corman directed all these sequences using the crew from The Raven. According to one report "mostly Corman shot people walking down hallways, entering doors and having a few conversations."

The director says they had a rough storyline "but no one really knew what their character's motivations were because we didn't know what was supposed to happen to them." The uniform worn by Jack Nicholson was used by Marlon Brando in Désirée (1954).

Boris Karloff later recalled:

Corman had the sketchiest outline of a story. I read it and begged him not to do it. He said "That's alright Boris, I know what I'm going to do. I want you for two days on this." I was in every shot, of course. Sometimes I was just walking through and then I would change my jacket and walk back. He nearly killed me on the last day. He had me in a tank of cold water for about two hours. After he got me in the can he suspended operations and went off and directed two or three operations to get the money, I suppose... [The sets] were so magnificent... As they were being pulled down around our ears, Roger was dashing around with me and a camera, two steps ahead of the wreckers. It was very funny.

Corman says they were so pressed for time towards the end of the second day, the crew shot footage without slating the shots.

Dick Miller later recalled, "When we were shooting in the castle, none of it made any sense. Some of the things I did were ridiculous because I was a butler and I was there just for Karloff to talk to, for Jack to talk to, just a butler."

The exteriors were shot at Point Lobos State Natural Reserve, Big Sur, Palos Verdes Peninsula, and Santa Barbara, all in California.

The Raven had been financed by American International Pictures (AIP), but The Terror was financed by Corman privately, albeit using sets that AIP had paid for without asking for their permission. Samuel Z. Arkoff of AIP later said he became suspicious when he attended the wrap party for The Raven and noticed that the sets had not been taken down. He says he later discovered Corman was using AIP sets for the director's own movie but Arkoff knew Corman would "put that film in a vault, finish, and come to us [AIP] with a distribution deal. So it turned out to be our picture anyway."

== Remaining footage ==
=== Francis Ford Coppola ===
After the Karloff scenes were shot, Gordon wrote the rest of the script for the movie. Dick Miller says "about three months later, when things slowed down" he "got a call: we were going to make a movie. I had forgotten all about it, literally."

Corman could not direct the rest of the film himself. He said after shooting the Karloff sequences "I didn't have the money to shoot the rest of the picture union, which meant I couldn't direct myself because I was personally signed with the unions."

Corman had recently hired Francis Ford Coppola to work as his assistant on Battle Beyond the Sun and The Haunted Palace, and assigned him to direct the rest of The Terror. Coppola went to Big Sur for what was meant to be three days to shoot additional footage using a crew of film students from UCLA. Nicholson says this involved "the stuff along the beach and the rocks with Jackie Haze, the horse, Helene, the young woman, and the witch's raven."

The crew included Jack Hill, who had done a number of jobs for Corman, and Gary Kurtz, who met Coppola during the making of the movie, starting a long collaboration between the men. Future Oscar-winning cinematographer Conrad Hall was also involved.

The unit ended up staying at Big Sur for 11 days. Nicholson said Coppola went over schedule and budget because "he just went ahead and did whatever he wanted" which infuriated Corman. "We all thought we'd be machine gunned or fired forever out of the business", said the actor. Jack Hill, who worked mostly as a sound recorder and second unit director, recalled "a major portion of his [Coppola's] script was day-for-night and he did not tell the cameraman that it was supposed to be night and the cameraman shot it for day. Because of the continuity in the story it was impossible to use that footage because it had to intercut with real night scenes."

Nicholson says that he almost drowned shooting a scene in the ocean at Big Sur – he was knocked over by a wave and his uniform almost dragged him down. During the shoot at Big Sur, Sandra Knight became pregnant with Jennifer, her daughter with Nicholson.

Corman says that once there Coppola decided to "change and improve the script" and came back with footage that "didn't exactly mesh with what I had shot. But it still looked pretty good."

=== Dennis Jakob ===
Corman still needed more footage for the flooding sequence, but then Coppola accepted a job at Seven Arts and was no longer available to do the required work. Coppola recommended a friend from UCLA, Dennis Jakob, who Corman hired to shoot shots of water at Hoover Dam. Corman says Jakob took three days and used Corman's camera and equipment to shoot his thesis movie on the side. Corman was annoyed but knew this was the sort of thing Corman liked to do himself. He used Jakob as Karloff's stand in for later scenes.

=== Monte Hellman ===
Corman felt The Terror still required more work, so he hired Monte Hellman to shoot exteriors at the cliffs of Palos Verdes with Nicholson and Miller and scenes at Santa Barbara. Nicholson says this involved "more raven stuff, more scenes with Jackie Haze."

Jack Hill was hired to re-write the script for these sequences. Hill later said. "We salvaged whatever footage we could salvage that was usable from what Francis shot, which was quite a bit, and then I wrote yet a new story. It required a whole change in story... That's when I got the screen credit for working on the script because eventually quite a bit of what I wrote was in the final picture and a lot of what Francis did was thrown out."

Monte Hellman said he "found the challenge of making a movie in five days exciting, especially with no budget." Corman says Hellman's footage changed the storyline once more "but it looked alright".

=== Jack Hill ===
More work needed to be done on the movie when Hellman was hired on another job, so Corman used Jack Hill to finish the movie. Corman says Hill was called away just before the end, so Jack Nicholson directed on the last day. It was the first time Nicholson had directed a film.

However Hill denies Nicholson directed any footage on The Terror, claiming it was Corman who directed the last day. "This was about a year later", said Hill, "I mean it took about a year for all this to go down, and he brought in a double for Boris Karloff, Dennis Jakob, who looks as much like Boris as I do. That was kind of the ending, where the water comes in, the rocks and everything fall, and if you look carefully you’ll notice that there's rocks floating on the water. He used a double for Sandra Knight."

Hill says by the end of the shoot Sandra Knight had become pregnant, "and that's why in those final scenes of the movie she's only shown above the waist and you’ll notice her breasts are four times the size they are in earlier scenes."

Miller later reflected:

In the rewrite I became the heavy. Now all these scenes I were played with different dimensions with fantastic character changes. So this came out at different levels, as well as my hair length and body weight. I was walking in and out of doors changing 20 pounds during this picture. And because the one part was shot in the winter and the other in the summer, my color would change. I would leave the castle white, come into the sunlight and I was practically black, really suntanned. And my hair was a different length; my sideburns were moving up and down. It was a wild thing.

The tree against which Sandra Knight expires in The Terror is the same one to which Price was tied and burned in The Haunted Palace.

=== Corman reshoots ===
Corman says when he cut together the work of the five directors "we all had interpreted the story differently and it showed. I saw two things working against it. There were some gaps in logic; and frankly it struck me as a little dull." Corman felt the story "made sense but it had no spark. It all seemed so predictable." He also felt the lighting from the first two days was flat.

Corman says that when he cut together Karloff's footage, he realized that "it didn't make sense" so he filmed a scene between Dick Miller and Jack Nicholson (in close-up because the sets had been taken down) and got them to explain the plot. This involved the twist that the Baron was not the Baron. Corman says he shot this scene between Nicholson and Miller on the last day of The Haunted Palace using the crew from that film.

Nicholson later reflected on the movie fondly, saying, "I had a great time. Paid the rent. They don't make movies like The Terror anymore."

== Release ==
When the film was released in the US, it was released the same day the British film The Mouse on the Moon (1963) was released in theatres US.

== Reception ==
The film was released on a double feature with Dementia 13 in September 1963.

=== Critical response ===
On the review aggregator website Rotten Tomatoes, 36% of 11 critics' reviews are positive, with an average rating of 5.0/10.

The Los Angeles Times thought The Terror was "spooky" with a "slow, lazy plot" and "Excellent photography and settings... it moves like a stately pavan but the authors exhibit some of that old Edgar Allan Poe touch for haunted happenings".

== Connection to Targets ==
In May 1966, Corman told Karloff that he would not be getting his deferred $15,000 since the film never made $150,000. However, he said that he would pay the money if Karloff worked on a new undetermined future project for Corman. This turned out to be the Peter Bogdanovich film Targets (1968). Karloff was paid his deferred fee once he agreed to be in the movie.

Bogdanovich says Corman told him he would finance a feature if Bogdanovich could use 20 minutes of new Karloff footage, 20 minutes of The Terror, and 40 minutes of new material with other actors. Bogdanovich watched The Terror and thought it was "an abomination", but said that gave him the idea of opening his movie with Karloff watching himself in The Terror and calling the movie terrible.

== Other appearances ==
Clips from the film appeared in Hollywood Boulevard (1976).

In 2010, the film was featured in the second episode of the revived, syndicated TV series Elvira's Movie Macabre. The climax scene was shown in the 2013 film Avenged.

== 1990s version and home media ==
In 1990, Dick Miller was hired to shoot new scenes to use as a framing sequence for an overseas version of The Terror. In this the main action of the film is presented in flashback. This was done for Corman to establish some sort of copyright as the original version did not have a copyright notice, therefore making it public domain on release. Dick Miller says the payment for these scenes was the most he had ever received from Corman.

The 1990 version of the film ran 91 minutes and was released on DVD in the UK as The Haunting (copyright at the end is to Concorde and New Horizons, companies owned by Corman), and featured scenes starring Wayne Grace as the son of the Karloff character (who irrelevantly summons forth a flying ghost in a satanic ritual) and Rick Dean as his dungeon torturer. The new scenes feature additional music by Mark Governer and the credits, added as video graphics over the original credit sequence, list Corman, Coppola, Nicholson, Hellman and Mark Griffiths as directors. The DVD also includes a new trailer which emphasises that the film is finally available in its "perfected form."

=== Original version ===
The film was released on VHS in 1987 by United American Video Corp., listed as Cat. #1056.

The Terror, restored from original 35mm elements, was released on April 26, 2011 from Film Chest and HD Cinema Classics. It is presented in widescreen with an aspect ratio of 16 x 9 and 5.1 surround sound mix. Enclosed is a collectible postcard reproduction of the original movie poster and the special features include Spanish subtitles, a before-and-after film restoration demo and a trailer.

== See also ==
- The Corman-Poe Cycle
- List of films in the public domain in the United States
- List of ghost films
