= Joan Freeman (actress) =

American retired actress (b. 1941)

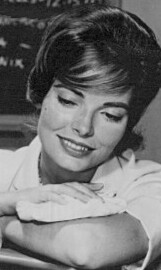
- Freeman in Bus Stop (1961)
- Born: August 26, 1941 (age 85); Council Bluffs, Iowa, U.S.
- Education: John Burroughs High School
- Occupations: Film and television actress
- Years active: 1949–1994
- Known for: Bus Stop; Tower of London; Roustabout; Panic in Year Zero!
- Spouse(s): Frank C. Beetson, Jr. (m. 1963; div. 1967) Bruce Kessler (m. 1976; his death 2024)

Joan Freeman (born August 26, 1941) is a retired American actress. Born in Council Bluffs, Iowa, she started her career as a child actress in the 1949 television series Sandy Dreams before making her film debut with the western Pistol Harvest. Starting from 1961, she appeared in TV series and films like Bus Stop, Panic in Year Zero!, and Tower of London, and in 1962 was nominated as Most Promising New Star in the film magazine Photoplay. In 1964, she played alongside Elvis Presley in Roustabout, and earned another Photoplay Gold Medal nomination. Her last acting role was in 1994.

== Early life ==
Freeman was born in Council Bluffs, Iowa. She attended Mother Cabrini School in Burbank, California, and later attended John Burroughs High School where she graduated in 1959.

== Career ==
Freeman started as a child actress, having appeared in the 1949 television series Sandy Dreams, along with Richard Beymer and Jill St. John. Her first film role was in Pistol Harvest (1951), where she had a small part playing the lead actress' character as a child. At fourteen, she played the character Jeannie Harlow in the 1956 episode "The Frontier Theatre" of the ABC western series, The Life and Legend of Wyatt Earp, with Hugh O'Brian in the title role.

Freeman started picking up roles in the late 1950s-early 1960s, playing one of Clifton Webb's many children in The Remarkable Mr. Pennypacker (1959), and one of the college students, along with Sandra Dee and Bobby Darin, who crash at an Italian villa owned by Rock Hudson in Come September (1961). After losing out to Carole Wells for a role in National Velvet, based on the 1944 film, in 1961–62 Freeman was cast in 26 episodes as the young waitress Elma Gahrigner in the ABC drama series Bus Stop, loosely based on the 1956 film, in a role that gave her some prominence. After Bus Stop, she appeared in guest-starring roles on the NBC modern western series, Empire, with Richard Egan and on the ABC/Warner Brothers western, The Dakotas. She also played defendant Jennifer Wakely in the Perry Mason episode "The Case of the Fickle Filly" in 1962.

In 1962, Freeman was cast as Marilyn Hayes in the post-atomic war black-and-white classic film Panic in Year Zero! alongside veteran film stars Ray Milland and Jean Hagen. Alabama newspaper The Anniston Star described Freeman as "lovely" in the part.

Also in 1962, she appeared in the quasi-historical film Tower of London with Vincent Price. She plays Margaret, one of the Queen's ladies-in-waiting who is held hostage by Price's Richard of Gloucester in the tower as he begins a rampage. Her work to that point was enough to gain her a Photoplay Gold Medal nomination from Photoplay film magazine as Most Promising New Star (Female). That was followed up by being named as a Hollywood Deb Star in 1963.

In 1963, she appeared in the Wagon Train episode "Alias Bill Hawks" (S6 E34) as Karen Wells. The next year, Freeman played the role of Elizabeth Dunn secretary to Dr. James Stone in the episode "Behold, Eck!" in the TV series The Outer Limits.

Also in 1963, Freeman was cast as American tourist Amelia Carter in The Three Stooges Go Around the World in a Daze. In 1964, she played the love interest of Elvis Presley in Roustabout. There she played the "good girl" pursuing Elvis and competing against a vixen type played by Sue Ane Langdon, all the while being stuck in arguments with her father, a bitter carnival hand played by Leif Erickson. Variety magazine said that "Miss Freeman hasn't much to do except wring her hands ... but does it prettily." In 1964 Freeman received a Photoplay Gold Medal nomination for Best Female Star. In The Rounders (1965), Freeman had a supporting role as a farm girl who pursues a reluctant Glenn Ford throughout the film.

In 1966, Freeman guest starred on The Man From U.N.C.L.E. in "The Bat Cave Affair". She appeared four times on the NBC western series The Virginian. Freeman also made a number of guest appearances on different television shows from the 1950s through the 1980s including National Velvet, Perry Mason, Family Affair, Gunsmoke, Wagon Train, and Bonanza.

Her last motion picture performance came as "Mrs. Jarvis" in the 1984 horror film, Friday the 13th: The Final Chapter. In 1994, Freeman appeared as an actress for the last time in an episode of the TV series Renegade.

== Filmography ==
- Pistol Harvest (1951) - Felice as a Child
- Trouble Along the Way (1953) - Minor Role (uncredited)
- Teenage Rebel (1956) - Teenager in Malt Shop (uncredited)
- The Remarkable Mr. Pennypacker (1959) - Mary Pennypacker (uncredited)
- Come September (1961) - Linda
- Panic in Year Zero! (1962) - Marilyn Hayes
- Tower of London (1962) - Lady Margaret
- The Virginian (TV series) (The Devil's Children) (1962) - Tabby McCallum
- The Three Stooges Go Around the World in a Daze (1963) - Amelia Carter
- Roustabout (1964) - Cathy Lean
- The Rounders (1965) - Meg Moore
- Bonanza (1965 TV Series) season 6 episode 26 (The Trap) - Hallie Shannon
- The Reluctant Astronaut (1967) - Ellie Jackson
- The Fastest Guitar Alive (1967) - Sue Chesnut
- Warhead (1977) - Namoi
- Jinxed! (1982) - Woman Agent
- Friday the 13th: The Final Chapter (1984) - Mrs. Jarvis
- Crystal Lake Memories: The Complete History of Friday the 13th (2013) - Herself
