= The Rounders (1965 film) =

1965 film by Burt Kennedy

- Promotional movie poster for the film
- Directed by: Burt Kennedy
- Screenplay by: Burt Kennedy
- Based on: The Rounders (novel) by Max Evans
- Produced by: Richard E. Lyons
- Starring: Glenn Ford; Henry Fonda; Sue Ane Langdon; Chill Wills; Edgar Buchanan; Hope Holiday
- Cinematography: Paul C. Vogel
- Edited by: John McSweeney Jr.
- Music by: Jeff Alexander
- Distributed by: Metro Goldwyn Mayer
- Release date: March 5, 1965
- Running time: 85 min.
- Country: United States
- Language: English
- Box office: $1,500,000

The Rounders is a 1965 American Western comedy film directed by Burt Kennedy and starring Glenn Ford and Henry Fonda. It is based on the 1960 novel of the same name by Max Evans.

According to Kennedy " It didn’t make a heck of a lot of money, but it was a good picture."

== Plot ==
Ben Jones and Marion "Howdy" Lewis are two easygoing, modern-day cowboys who make a meager living breaking wild horses. Their frequent employer is Jim Ed Love, a shrewd businessman who always gets the better of them. After they bring him a string of tamed horses and spend the winter rounding up stray cows, he talks them into taking an undistinguished roan horse in lieu of some of their wages.

To his great and frequent discomfort, Ben finds that the horse is unrideable. Rather than turning the horse into soap or dog food, he decides to take it to a rodeo and bet other cowhands that they cannot ride it, thereby doubling his and Howdy's earnings. Along the way, the duo stop to help two dimwitted strippers, Mary and Sister, with their car, which has broken down. Not knowing much about cars, they give them a ride to the nearest garage, but end up getting to know them better (going skinny dipping with them) and taking them along to the rodeo. The girls unfortunately lose their clothes and have to dress in waitress aprons, leaving them exposed in the rear. The guys use their hats to cover them up.

Everything goes as planned; nobody is able to stay on the horse. However, the horse suddenly collapses and even though Ben and Howdy are willing to spend all the money that they have won on veterinary help, the vet tells them it is hopeless: the horse should be destroyed. Ben walks into the stable, cocks the pistol and closes his eyes. A shot is heard. Ben comes flying out, and the roan kicks the stable to pieces, They give Tanner $475, all they have (the vet charged them more than $100). Tanner demands $200 more. Love steps in with the rest of the money, tells the boys they can work it out at his ranch and drives. They consider the benefits of life on Love's ranch. Ben muses that the definition of a bronc rider is “a cowboy with his brains kicked out.” They drive away, and a police car makes a U-turn to follow them.

== Cast ==
- Glenn Ford as Ben Jones
- Henry Fonda as Howdy Lewis
- Sue Ane Langdon as Mary
- Hope Holiday as Sister
- Chill Wills as Jim Ed Love
- Edgar Buchanan as Vince Moore
- Kathleen Freeman as Agatha Moore
- Joan Freeman as Meg Moore
- Denver Pyle as Bull
- Barton MacLane as Tanner
- Warren Oates as Harley Williams
- Doodles Weaver as Arlee
- Allegra Varron as Mrs. Norson
- Casey Tibbs as Rafe

== Production ==
The highly scenic filming locations were in and around Sedona, Arizona, including the Village of Oak Creek.

== Reception ==
The film was a sleeper hit.

In a contemporary review, The New York Times found the film to be a "...good, small Western—far from perfect but beautifully personified by two wise, winning veterans". Reviewing The Rounders for the Los Angeles Times, Margaret Harford wrote: "The plot is thin, the comedy rather forced and the casting is unbelievable but at least it's a pleasant change from all those psychological westerns and attempted satires on same."

Kennedy said " think the only author who liked what I did with his work was Max Evans. Max wrote the novel The Rounders, which I made with Henry Fonda and Glenn Ford. Max and I have been friends ever since."

Kennedy later produced and directed a TV pilot based on the film.

== See also ==
- The Rounders, a TV series based on the film with Ron Hayes taking over Ford's role, Patrick Wayne assuming Fonda's, and Chill Wills returning as Jim Ed Love.
- List of American films of 1965
- List of films about horses
