= Joan Dixon =

American actress (1930–1992)

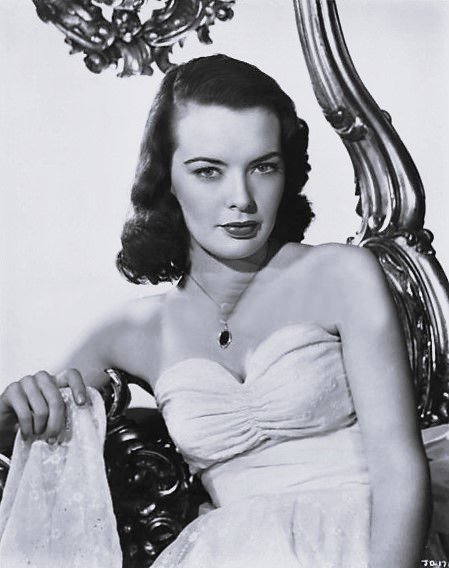
- Born: June 6, 1930; Norfolk, Virginia, U.S.
- Died: February 20, 1992 (aged 61); Los Angeles, California, U.S.
- Occupations: Film, television actress, singer
- Years active: 1950–1958
- Spouses: Theodore Briskin (m. 1952; div. 1953) William Driscoll (m. 1958; div. 1959)

Joan Dixon (born Dollie Joan Johnson; June 6, 1930 – February 20, 1992) was an American film and television actress in the 1950s, best known for her role in the film noir Roadblock (1951).

== Career ==
Dixon appeared in ten films in the 1950s, co-starring in five westerns with Tim Holt. She had a starring role in a 1950 crime drama, Experiment Alcatraz.

In May 1952, Dixon's eighth and final starring film was the Tim Holt–Richard Martin western, Desert Passage, marking the last time her name would grace a marquee. It was the last of five films they made together and Holt's final RKO western.

Dixon made a brief appearance in the May 27, 1956, episode of Alfred Hitchcock Presents titled "Legacy" (season 1, episode 35) as a "Jealous Girl."

A July 20, 1956, Edwin Schallert drama column in the Los Angeles Times reported that John Wayne, Angie Dickinson, and Joan Dixon would appear in the RKO Radio Pictures film I Married a Woman.

A January 17, 1957, Miami News feature titled "Miami's Joan Dixon: Ex-'Calendar Girl' of Florida has role in Ford TV Theater" reported that Dixon would appear in the Ford TV Theater season 8 episode "Sweet Charlie", which also starred Frank Lovejoy and Dick Foran.

While under contract at RKO Pictures, Dixon was managed by Howard Hughes.

According to the 1952 Production Encyclopedia, Dixon was listed as a contract actress for Hughes Productions, located at 7000 Romaine Street in Hollywood, with Howard Hughes serving as president and T. Slack as attorney.

From approximately February 1960 through early 1961, Dixon performed as a vocalist at Dean Martin's nightclub, Dino's Lodge in Los Angeles, California.

During her engagement, she gained local media attention when an evening gown mishap occurred, requiring quick thinking to manage the wardrobe malfunction.

== Personal life ==
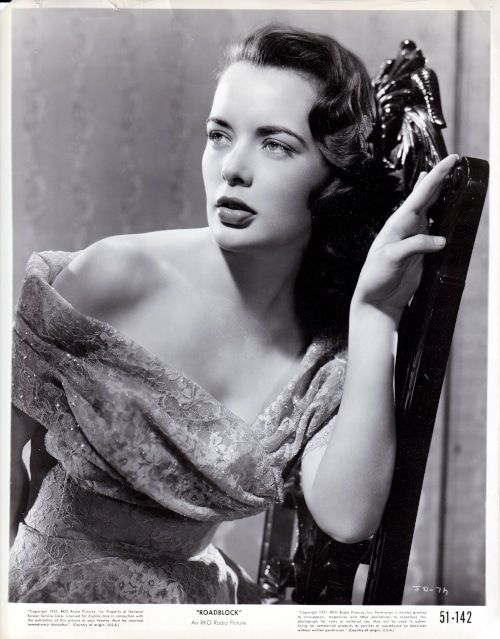
Joan Dixon in a glamour publicity portrait for Roadblock (1951). This image was widely used for international fan magazine covers.

Joan Dixon started modeling and competing in local beauty pageants as a teenager in the late 1940s in Hialeah, Miami-Dade County, Florida, with her photos appearing frequently in the Miami News and the Miami Herald.

One of her earliest professional modeling advertisements was for the Miami-based Coronet Academy of Modeling and Agency, run by Marion Johnson.

She graduated from Miami Edison High School in 1948.

Dixon began appearing in Hollywood fan magazines around August 1950 to promote her upcoming feature film debut in Bunco Squad, which was released on September 1, 1950.

An August 13, 1950, Miami Herald profile titled "Stardom: Joan Dixon of Miami gains top film roles," promoted her film debut.

In his October 4, 1950, nationally syndicated column, Ed Sullivan reported that Howard Hughes and RKO film actress Dixon were an item.

A March 11, 1951, the New York Daily News featured Dixon in a profile titled "The Scenic Route to Stardom," describing her as one of Howard Hughes's newest protégées. The article detailed her path from graduating high school in Miami in June 1948 to moving to New York, where a talent scout discovered her and sent her to RKO for a screen test. It noted that under Hughes's direction, she quietly worked in early feature films—such as Bunco Squad, Double Deal (released as Experiment Alcatraz), and Pistol Harvest—before receiving a major studio publicity buildup.

A March 29, 1951, story in The Virginian-Pilot reported that Norfolk native Dixon attended the 23rd Academy Awards at the RKO Pantages Theatre, wearing a strapless black taffeta dress accessorized with purple orchids and no jewelry.

Dixon was the "Theme Girl" for the 1951 North–South Shrine Game, played on Dec. 25, 1951, at the Orange Bowl in Miami and since she was from the area, the local press went all-out giving her lots of coverage. The charity game raised funds for the Shriners’ hospitals for children and should not be confused with the New Year’s Day Orange Bowl game, which led to the date mix‑up in some later sources.

On Friday, Oct. 17, 1952, Dixon eloped with Chicago, Illinois camera manufacturer Theodore "Ted" Briskin, the first husband of Betty Hutton. Dixon and Briskin were married in the wedding chapel of the Flamingo Hotel, Las Vegas, Nevada; she was 22 and he was 35.

The Friday, Oct. 17, 1952, edition of the Las Vegas Review-Journal was the first publication to announce the 4 a.m. wedding: “Whirlwind Love Affair ends in Marriage Here” was the front page.

It reported that the couple arrived on the spur of the moment via flight from Hollywood without baggage, having only met for their first in-person date the previous night following several weeks of phone calls. Whisked to the courthouse for a license by Abe Schiller of the Flamingo, they borrowed a ring from him for the quick ceremony. The wedding proceeded without music as an organist could not be reached at that hour, and Katherine Day served as the other witness. After the ceremony, the couple immediately returned to Hollywood.

On November 4, 1952, Jimmie Fidler’s nationally syndicated “In Hollywood” column reported that Howard Hughes was blindsided by RKO actress Joan Dixon’s quickie marriage to Ted Briskin, believing he was still her beau.

Their marriage lasted three weeks, with Dixon leaving Briskin in early November 1952.

After being separated for more than a year, the Joan Dixon–Ted Briskin divorce was granted on January 19, 1954. The divorce made the front page of the Los Angeles Times.

Regarding the three-week marriage, Dixon testified, “he wanted to get rid of me as quickly and painlessly as possible,” adding that he was very difficult to please. She stated, “We were living at the Shoreham Hotel in Chicago. He suggested I open charge accounts in of the stores and then he would close them,” noting that the accounts would be closed the same day she opened them. While discussing moving into an apartment, Dixon testified he told her, “'I would have to live in a mud hut if he chose, because I was his wife.'” They later met to discuss a reconciliation in an attorney's office and she was willing to try again, but Briskin said, “'absolutely not,' and that the marriage had been a mistake. That was Nov. 10, 1952.”

On February 14, 1958, Dixon's second marriage was to writer William L. Driskill, who was an uncredited writer for the 1962 version of Mutiny on the Bounty.

A March 20, 1958, syndicated column by gossip columnist Harrison Carroll reported, “Some secrets can be kept, even in Hollywood:” Dixon and writer Bill Driskill were married on Valentine’s Day, in Santa Barbara and are now living in Hollywood.

On February 9, 1959, a syndicated column by gossip columnist Harrison Carroll reported that Joan Dixon had retained attorney Seymour Chotiner to file suit for divorce from Driskill on a charge of cruelty, and that she would ask for no alimony. Dixon stated, “’I have a new career now, night club singing,’ she says. ‘I’m going to concentrate on that.’”

On February 25, 1959, the Los Angeles Evening Citizen News reported that Dixon, 28, of 2079 Mount Street, Hollywood, was granted a divorce the previous day from writer Driskill. The couple had separated on January 14, and she testified he left home to concentrate on a novel while she waived alimony.

On February 8, 1963, a malpractice suit filed by Josephine (Joan) Dixon against a Manhattan plastic surgeon went on trial, with Dixon claiming that surgeries in November 1959 and subsequent unorthodox treatments left her with disfiguring scars, tissue loss, and permanent hair loss. She lists addresses as both Beverly Hills and New York City.

On February 20, 1963, United Press International reported that the all-male jury was hopelessly deadlocked after more than six hours of deliberation, resulting in a mistrial.

On February 20, 1992, Dixon died of heart disease at her Hollywood home at age 61, with memorial services held at Crescent Heights Methodist Church.

In September 2026, a new digital repository, the Joan Dixon Reference Archive was launched to reconstruct the life and career of the early-1950s actress. It draws on contemporary newspapers and magazines, studio records, interviews and other archival sources to document Dixon's films, career and personal life.

== Partial filmography ==
- Bunco Squad (1950) as Grace Bradshaw
- Experiment Alcatraz (1950) as Lieutenant Joan McKenna
- Law of the Badlands (1951) as Velvet
- Gunplay (1951) as Terry Blake
- Pistol Harvest (1951) as Felice Moran
- Roadblock (1951) as Diane Morley
- Hot Lead (1951) as Gail Martin
- Desert Passage (1952) as Emily Bryce
- Captain John Smith and Pocahontas (1953) as Powhatan Maiden (uncredited)
- General Electric Theater (1956) (Season 4, Episode 29: "That's the Man!") as Secretary
- The Lineup (1956) (Season 2, Episode 34: "Wharton Case") as Stewardess
- Alfred Hitchcock Presents (1956) (Season 1 Episode 35: "The Legacy") as Jealous Girl
- Highway Patrol (1956) (Season 1, Episode 38: "Prospector") as Dispatcher
- Ford Theatre (1957) (Season 5, Episode 16: "Sweet Charlie") as Charlene Lopez
- I Married a Woman (filmed in 1956, released in 1958) as John Wayne's other wife (uncredited)
