= Panic in Year Zero! =

1962 film by Ray Milland

- Theatrical release poster
- Directed by: Ray Milland
- Screenplay by: Jay Simms; John Morton
- Story by: Jay Simms
- Produced by: Arnold Houghland; Lou Rusoff
- Starring: Ray Milland; Jean Hagen; Frankie Avalon
- Cinematography: Gilbert Warrenton
- Edited by: William Austin
- Music by: Les Baxter
- Production company: Alta Vista Productions
- Distributed by: American International Pictures
- Release date: July 5, 1962 (United States)
- Running time: 93 minutes
- Country: United States
- Language: English
- Budget: $225,000

Panic in Year Zero! is a 1962 American black-and-white survival science fiction film from American International Pictures. It was produced by Arnold Houghland and Lou Rusoff, directed by Ray Milland, who also stars with Jean Hagen, Frankie Avalon, Mary Mitchel, and Joan Freeman. The original music score was composed by Les Baxter. The screenplay was written by John Morton and Jay Simms. The film was released by AIP in 1962 as a double feature with Tales of Terror.

== Plot ==
Harry Baldwin, his wife Ann, their son Rick, and daughter Karen leave suburban Los Angeles at sunrise to go on a fishing trip to the southern Sierra Nevada wilderness, bringing with them a small camping trailer. After a couple of hours on the road, Harry and Ann are startled by a series of unusually bright lights in the sky, accompanied by a radio station going to static. Tuning through stations, they hear a sporadic news report broadcast on CONELRAD that hint at the start of an atomic war, confirmed when the Baldwins see a large mushroom cloud from a hydrogen bomb rising over Los Angeles, now many miles away. The family attempt to return home and rescue Ann's mother, but Harry soon realizes that the roads will be clogged by panicked people, and what is left of the city will be saturated in atomic fallout. Stopping at a small diner to get food and find out what is happening, Harry hears that Los Angeles was hit by two hydrogen bombs: one over downtown Los Angeles, the other at the Port of Los Angeles. San Diego and San Francisco were also targets. With this news, deciding that his family's survival must come first, Harry decides to continue to their secluded vacation spot in the mountains, abandoning Ann's mother, and weather the crisis from there.

The Baldwins stop to buy supplies at a small town off the main road, which has not yet been inundated by refugees from Los Angeles. Harry attempts to purchase tools and guns from hardware store owner Ed Johnson with a personal check. However, Johnson believes only Los Angeles has been hit, and the government remains intact, so he insists on following state law and withholding the guns for 24 hours while Harry's checks are verified. Harry absconds with the weapons by attacking Johnson with Rick's help, but he tells Johnson that he will eventually return and pay for them in full. Soon after, Harry stops at a gas station for fuel and finds that the attendant is engaging in price gouging. Unable to pay for all the fuel he wants, Harry attacks the attendant, leaves what cash he can for the fuel he has taken, and the family continue down the road. Later, the family encounter three threatening young hoodlums, Carl, Mickey, and Andy, but manage to fend them off.

After a harrowing journey, the Baldwins reach their destination. Realizing their trailer offers no protection from radioactive fallout, they take the contents of the trailer, and find shelter in a cave where they settle in and wait for civil order to be restored. On their portable radio, they listen to war news and learn that what remains of the United Nations has declared this to be "Year Zero". Harry and Rick discover that Ed Johnson and his wife have coincidentally set up camp nearby, but not for long: the three hoodlums arrive, and murder Ed Johnson and his wife.

While doing laundry, Ann unwittingly allows a blouse to float downstream, alerting Mickey and Andy to the Baldwins' presence. They accost and rape Karen, but Ann scares them off with a rifle. Harry and Rick begin a search for the rapists, and find them at a farm house, where Harry kills both of them. The Baldwins also discover a teenage girl, Marilyn, kept in a locked room as a sex slave. When questioned, she explains that she lived at the house with her parents before they were murdered by the three hoodlums. Marilyn is freed and brought to the cave, where she is cared for by Ann and accepted into the Baldwin family.

Sometime later, Marilyn accompanies Rick while he chops wood outside the camp. Carl, the third hoodlum, sneaks up behind Marilyn and forces her to drop her rifle. He questions her about what happened to his buddies. Marilyn slips out of Carl's grasp and Rick throws a piece of wood at Carl, distracting him from Marilyn. She grabs the rifle and kills Carl. During the confrontation, Carl shoots Rick in the leg.

The Baldwins leave their camp to find a doctor named Strong, whom Marilyn knows in a nearby town. On the drive there, the group hears that "the enemy" has requested a truce and "Year Zero" is ending. Doctor Strong stabilizes Rick, but he warns that the young man will die without a blood transfusion. The closest place that can handle the procedure is an Army hospital more than 100 miles (160 km) away. En route to the hospital, the Baldwins are stopped by an Army patrol. After a tense conversation, they are allowed to continue. The soldiers watch the Baldwins leave and note that the family is among the "good ones" who escaped radiation sickness by being in the mountains when the atomic bombs exploded. As the Baldwins drive on, an end title card states: "There must be no end – only a new beginning".

== Cast ==
- Ray Milland as Harry Baldwin
- Jean Hagen as Ann Baldwin
- Frankie Avalon as Rick Baldwin, son
- Mary Mitchel as Karen Baldwin, daughter
- Joan Freeman as Marilyn Hayes
- Richard Bakalyan as Carl
- Rex Holman as Mickey
- Neil Nephew as Andy
- Richard Garland as Ed Johnson, hardware store owner
- Shary Marshall as Bobbie Johnson
- Willis Bouchey as Dr. Powell Strong
- O.Z. Whitehead as Hogan, grocery store owner
- Russ Bender as Harkness
- Byron Morrow as evacuee from Newhall
- Hugh Sanders as evacuee from Chatsworth

== Production ==
The film was originally known as Survival. Samuel Z. Arkoff of AIP said Avalon and Milland were teamed together because "they both have particular types of followers and the combination adds up to an attraction." Filming started 22 February 1962.

Roger Corman later said about the film, "the subject was exciting, but the technicians who worked on the film, who were my technicians, told me that Ray had been somewhat overwhelmed. He wasn’t organized enough to act and direct at the same time. He lost time on a three-week schedule, and forgot his scenes."

== Reception ==
Frankie Avalon later said, "The film came out to real good reviews." American International Pictures sent the star around the country to promote it. He went on to say, "We did a tour of theaters in Los Angeles, and it made its money back just in Los Angeles alone."

This success led to Avalon making a number of films with AIP.

=== Critical ===
Michael Atkinson, the film critic for The Village Voice, liked the film and wrote in 2005, "This forgotten, saber-toothed 1962 AIP cheapie might be the most expressive on-the-ground nightmare of the Cold War era, providing a template not only for countless social-breakdown genre flicks (most particularly, Michael Haneke's Time of the Wolf) but also for authentic crisis—shades of New Orleans haunt its DVD margins...the movie is nevertheless an anxious, detail-rich essay on moral collapse."

Glenn Erickson writes, in his DVD Savant review, "Panic In Year Zero! scrupulously avoids any scenes requiring more than minimalist production values yet still delivers on its promise, allowing audience imagination to expand upon the narrow scope of what's actually on the screen. It sure seemed shocking in 1962, and easily trumped other more pacifistic efforts. The Day the Earth Caught Fire was for budding flower people; Panic In Year Zero! could have been made as a sales booster for the gun industry."

Filmink called it "one of Avalon's most thought-provoking films (especially if you don't see the filmmakers as endorsing Milland's actions). It is probably his best dramatic film role."

== See also ==
- List of American films of 1962
- List of apocalyptic films
- List of nuclear holocaust fiction
- Survival film, about the film genre, with a list of related films
