= Harry August Jansen =

American magician (1883–1955)

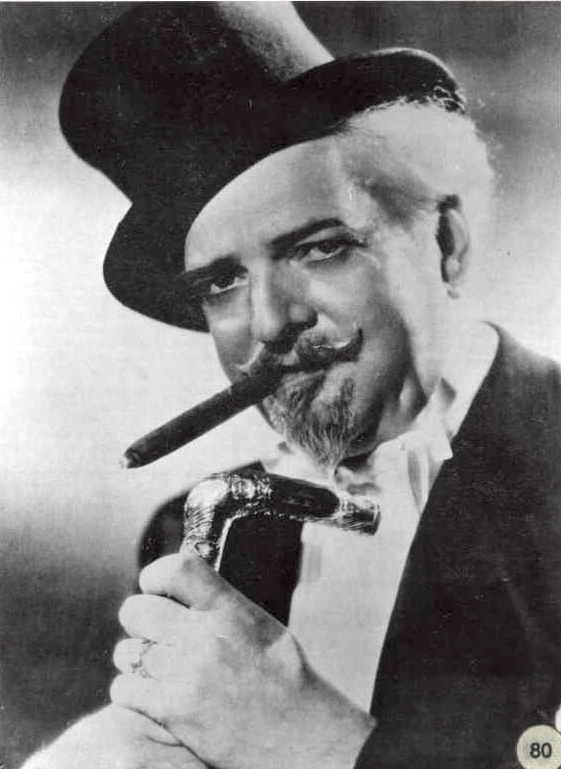
- Born: Harry August Jensen; October 3, 1883; Copenhagen, Denmark
- Died: June 15, 1955 (aged 71); Northridge, California, U.S.
- Other names: Dante the Magician; The Great Jansen
- Occupation: Magician
- Spouse: Edna Herr (m. 1905)

Harry August Jansen (born Jensen; October 3, 1883 – June 15, 1955) was a Danish-born American entertainer who traveled the world as a professional magician under the name Dante the Magician.

== Biography ==
Harry August Jensen was born on October 3, 1883, in Copenhagen, Denmark. At the age of 6, Jansen came to St. Paul, Minnesota, in the United States, with his family.

At the age of 16, Jansen made his stage debut under Charles Wagner. He then set off on a world tour for five years as The Great Jansen. In 1922, magician Howard Thurston, realizing Jansen's talent and possible competition to him, engaged Jansen to star in the #2 Thurston show. Thurston gave Jansen the stage name of Dante. The name came from the original Dante, Oscar Eliason (1869–1899), who had been killed in a tragic hunting accident in Australia years earlier. In 1925, Dante the Magician Inc. came into being with Thurston as co-owner. The 2nd unit Thurston show was built and co-produced by Jansen.

Dante was known throughout the world under the name Dante the Magician, working in vaudeville, burlesque, legitimate theatre, films, and in later years, television. Dante and his troupe, consisting of between 25 and 40 performers, made several global trips and appeared in many U.S. theaters. His stage trademark was to utter three nonsense words, "Sim Sala Bim" (adapted from the lyrics of the Danish children's song Højt på en gren en krage, which contains the nonsense words simsaladim bamba saladu saladim), during his performances to acknowledge applause. He can be seen using these words in the Swedish 1931 feature Dantes mysterier (Dante's Mysteries) and in the 1942 Laurel and Hardy comedy A-Haunting We Will Go. Dante Though other magicians like Kalanag have claimed to have invented the phrase.

Dante also appeared as himself in Racket Busters (1938), A-Haunting We Will Go (1942), and Bunco Squad (1950), and played a character role in Jean Renoir's The Golden Coach (1952).

In 1940 he produced and starred the Broadway revue Sim Sala Bim on the Morosco Theatre. With television, the public stayed home more often, and the world of variety theatre suffered drastically. As a result, Dante retired to Southern California in the late 1940s.

He died at his ranch in Northridge, California, of a heart attack, at the age of 71. He was alone at the time of his death.

== Legacy ==
With Dante's death, what historically has been known as the "Golden Age of Magic" came to an end. Gone were the variety theaters of the world, and with it were the large traveling magic productions that had thrilled and mystified millions for generations. In prior decades, the magical lineage created by the American public had elevated magicians Alexander Herrmann, Harry Kellar, Thurston and Dante to the position of the #1 magician in the country.

Shortly before Dante's death, he approached a young magician, Lee Grabel, to be his successor in the lineage of great magicians. Plans were underway at the time of Dante's death. However, because Dante died before making a public announcement, some magical historians believe the lineage ended with Dante. This magician has since chosen a Las Vegas headliner magician, Lance Burton to be his successor, therefore carrying on the tradition of the magical lineage to another generation. Despite this, its authenticity is still questioned by some.

In 1991, magic historian Phil Temple published the definitive biography of Dante the Magician, Dante - The Devil Himself, based largely on Dante's personal records, and Temple's friendship with surviving family members who had toured with the show decades earlier.

Years later, a memoir about life on the road with the Dante show was written by Marion Trikosko, who spent two years with Dante as an assistant. His book, Trouping with Dante, was published in 2006.

== See also ==
- List of magicians in film
- List of magic museums
