= I Married a Woman =

1958 film

- Film poster
- Directed by: Hal Kanter
- Written by: Goodman Ace
- Produced by: William Bloom
- Starring: George Gobel; Diana Dors; Adolphe Menjou
- Cinematography: Lucien Ballard
- Edited by: Kennie Marstella
- Music by: Cyril Mockridge
- Production company: RKO Radio Pictures
- Distributed by: Universal-International
- Release date: May 14, 1958
- Running time: 85 minutes
- Country: United States
- Language: English

I Married a Woman is a 1958 American comedy film made in 1956, directed by Hal Kanter, written by Goodman Ace, and starring George Gobel, Diana Dors, and Adolphe Menjou. The picture was produced by Gobel's company, Gomalco Productions. I Married a Woman also features John Wayne in a cameo role as himself. It was filmed in RKO-Scope and black and white except for one of Wayne's two scenes, which was shot in Technicolor. The film's original title was So There You Are. The film was a box-office disappointment, which hurt the careers of Dors and Gobel.

== Plot ==
Advertising executive Mickey Briggs is given 48 hours by his boss, Sutton, to come up with a campaign for client Luxemberg Beer, and save the company from ruin. Mickey neglects his wife, Janice, who once had been a "Miss Luxemberg" in a successful advertising campaign featuring various attractive models. Janice has just discovered she is expecting a baby, but is unable to inform Mickey, who is too distracted by work. Even when they find time to go to a movie, John Wayne is on screen, being considerate to his screen wife, which makes Janice weepy, but Mickey finds unrealistic.

It does give Mickey an idea, however, for a campaign in which "Miss Luxemberg" is now "Mrs. Luxemberg", enjoying family bliss. Sutton loves it, then rejects all the applicants until he decides that Janice herself must return to be "Mrs. Luxemberg". Film footage of their real life is shot without Janice's knowledge. All goes terribly wrong, with Janice instead suing Mickey for divorce and Sutton's company for $100,000. After flirting with Mickey's wife, best pal Bob Sanders breaks the news that she is pregnant, which makes Mickey try harder to win her back. On a cruise and in love again, the couple is startled to spot John Wayne on board, arguing with his wife.

== Cast ==
- George Gobel as Marshall "Mickey" Briggs
- Diana Dors as Janice Blake Briggs aka Miss Luxemberg
- Adolphe Menjou as Frederick W. Sutton
- Jessie Royce Landis as Marshall's mother-in-law
- Nita Talbot as Miss Anderson, Briggs' secretary
- William Redfield as Eddie Benson, elevator operator
- Stephen Dunne as Bob Sanders
- John McGiver as Girard, Sutton's lawyer
- Steve Pendleton as photographer trailing Briggs
- John Wayne as himself (uncredited)
- Angie Dickinson as John Wayne's wife (uncredited)
- Joan Dixon as John Wayne's other wife (uncredited)
- Jeanne Carmen as Camera Girl (uncredited)

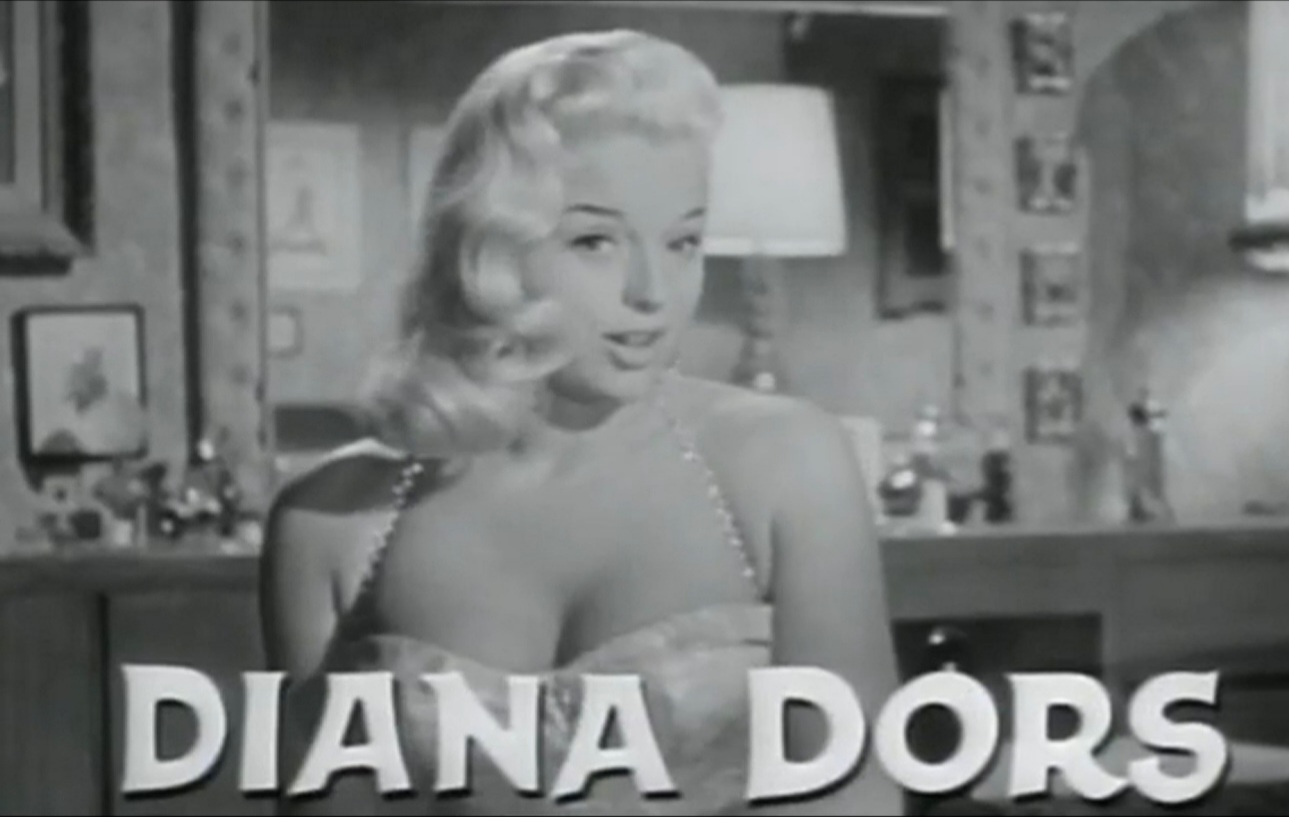
Diana Dors in I Married a Woman film trailer

== Production ==
The film was based on an original story by New York radio writer and producer, Goodman Ace. In September 1950, the screen rights were bought by Norman Krasna and Jerry Wald, who had a production deal at RKO. They wanted to cast Cary Grant and Betsy Drake. In October, Richard Fleischer was assigned the job of directing. In November, Celeste Holm was announced as star. Ace was brought to Hollywood to work on a script, which Krasna wanted to aim at the female audience. In December 1950, RKO announced the film would be made the following year.

Production, however, kept being put back. In February, Wald and Krasna said the film would be made in August, with Stanley Rubin as producer, but the film had no star or director. In September 1951, Wald and Krasna said they had a script, and wanted to cast Cary Grant but wanted to get the casting right. Wald and Krasna eventually left RKO.

The project was reactivated a number of years later. In April 1956, Diana Dors signed to play the female lead opposite TV star George Gobel. Her fee was $75,000 plus expenses. It was Gobel's second leading role after The Birds and the Bees, in which Gobel had top billing above Mitzi Gaynor and David Niven.

Dors arrived in the US in late June. The job of directing was given to Hal Kanter, who worked with Gobel in television. Filming took place in July 1956. Kanter called the film "light and frothy. It gave Goodman Ace... the chance to unload a lot of witty barbs he's been saving up over the years." Gobel called Dors "a fine performer". During filming RKO signed Dors to make a second film, The Lady and the Prowler, which became The Unholy Wife.

== Critical reception ==
A contemporary review by Howard Thompson in The New York Times reported that the film was a "thin little comedy" that "laboriously widens one running gag to feature length." Describing Dors as "pouting [and] blank-faced," Thompson also noted that "the task of stretching what might have made a pretty good fifteen-minute television sketch into eighty-four minutes just about licks everybody." Writing in AllMovie, film critic Hal Erickson described the film as "tailored by top comedy writer Goodman Ace to the peculiar, low-key talents of TV comedian George Gobel," and noted that it "was lensed in black-and-white, except for the Technicolor [unbilled] John Wayne sequences." Film critic Dennis Schwartz wrote that "mediocre director Hal Kanter [...] is clueless how to draw comedy out of the unfunny screenplay," that "George Gobel and Britain’s sexpot answer to Marilyn Monroe, Diana Dors [...] lacked chemistry together," and that "even for TV comedy this stuff is awful."

== See also ==
- John Wayne filmography
