= Roadblock (film) =

1951 film directed by Harold Daniels

- Theatrical release poster
- Directed by: Harold Daniels
- Screenplay by: George Bricker; Steve Fisher
- Story by: Richard H. Landau; Daniel Mainwaring
- Produced by: Lewis J. Rachmil
- Starring: Charles McGraw; Joan Dixon
- Cinematography: Nicholas Musuraca
- Edited by: Robert Golden
- Music by: Paul Sawtell
- Distributed by: RKO Pictures
- Release date: July 30, 1951
- Running time: 73 minutes
- Country: United States
- Language: English

Roadblock is a 1951 American film noir directed by Harold Daniels and starring Charles McGraw and Joan Dixon. The film's cinematographer was Nicholas Musuraca and it was shot on location in Los Angeles.

== Plot ==
Insurance investigator Joe Peters and his partner Harry Miller solve a lucrative recovery case and prepare to fly home. At the airport, Joe meets Diane who, lacking enough money to afford a ticket, pretends to be Joe's wife without his knowledge in order to obtain a half-fare ticket. They are assigned to the same hotel room after a storm forces an emergency landing and layover, and an uneasy détente develops. Joe is attracted to Diane despite his dislike for chiselers. She loves the finer things in life that Joe cannot afford on his small salary of $350 per month. They part uneasily when they reach Los Angeles.

When Joe and Harry are assigned to investigate Kendall Webb, the prime suspect in a string of fur robberies, Joe encounters Diane, who has become Webb's mistress. Their mutual attraction resurfaces and Joe, in order to finance a dream life with Diane, plots to use inside information on a cash shipment of $1.25 million to plan a robbery for Webb in return for one-third of the take. Unaware of the deal and disillusioned at being a kept woman, Diane decides that her love for Joe is greater than her avarice. When she tells Joe that she wants to marry him, he tries to remove himself from the deal with Webb. However, Webb convinces him that Diane's attitude might change after a few months living on his paltry pay.

The railway mail-car robbery is successful, but a railroad employee is injured and later dies. The robbery coincides with Joe and Diane's honeymoon, providing him with an alibi. One of the robbers is identified and arrested. With the investigation narrowing its focus, Joe confesses to Diane.

Desperate, Joe arranges to meet Webb on a desolate stretch of highway by lying to him that he has a plan to rescue them. Instead, he knocks Webb unconscious and stages a car accident in which Webb is killed and his share of the money is partially burned. Harry discovers that his partner is involved and pleads with him to surrender to the police. Cornered, Joe tries to flee to Mexico with Diane but is located and shot. He dies in Diane's arms.

== Cast ==
- Charles McGraw as Joe Peters
- Joan Dixon as Diane
- Lowell Gilmore as Kendall Webb
- Louis Jean Heydt as Harry Miller
- Milburn Stone as Egan
