= Gunplay (film) =

1951 film by Lesley Selander

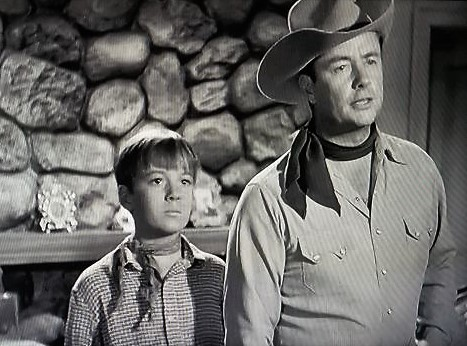
- Harper Carter and Tim Holt in "Gunplay"
- Directed by: Lesley Selander
- Written by: Ed Earl Repp
- Produced by: Herman Schlom
- Starring: Tim Holt
- Cinematography: J. Roy Hunt
- Edited by: Douglass Biggs
- Music by: Mischa Bakaleinikoff
- Distributed by: RKO Pictures
- Release date: April 24, 1951
- Running time: 61 min.
- Country: United States
- Language: English
- Box office: $145,000

Gunplay is a 1951 American Western film directed by Lesley Selander and starring Tim Holt and Joan Dixon, who had costarred in Law of the Badlands earlier in the year. The film was originally titled Gun Notches. Filming took place in late 1950.

== Plot ==
A man named Sam Martin is killed, but when his son identifies the killer's name, no one has ever heard of him.

== Cast ==
- Tim Holt as Tim Holt
- Joan Dixon as Terry Blake
- Harper Carter as Chip Martin
- Mauritz Hugo as Curt Landry
- Robert Bice as Sam Martin
- Marshall Reed as Dobbs
- Cornelius Keefe as Sheriff (credited as Jack Hill)

== External list ==
- Gunplay at IMDb
- Gunplay at the TCM Movie Database (archived version)
- Gunplay at the AFI Catalog of Feature Films
