= William Harper Carter =

American entrepreneur and former actor

- Born: William Harper Carter; August 15, 1939 (age 87); Los Angeles, California, US
- Other name: Bill Carter
- Occupations: Actor, Realtor

William Harper "Bill" Carter (born August 15, 1939) is an American businessman and former child actor. Using the stage name Harper Carter, he acted in several films as a child, notably the 1953 film Titanic, and appeared in adult roles in the late 1960s and early 1970s in film and television. In 1974, he moved to Westlake Village, California, and began working in real estate. In 1992 he became executive vice president of Sotheby's International Realty. Teamed with a fellow real estate agent, he has listed and sold more than one billion dollars in property.

== Early life ==
William Harper Carter was born on August 15, 1939, in Los Angeles, California.

== Film career ==
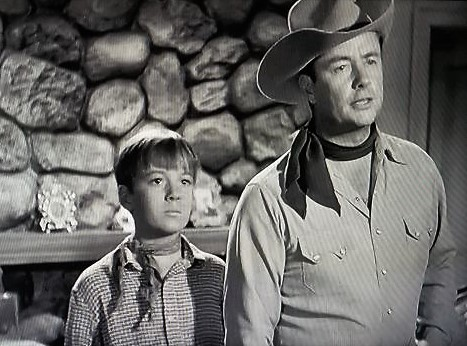
Carter (left) with Tim Holt in Gunplay, 1951

As a child, Carter acted in both films and commercials. He is best known for his role as Norman Sturgess, the son of a fictional couple aboard the RMS Titanic, in the 1953 film Titanic. He received good reviews for his performance; The New York Times called him "manly" and a book review complimented him for showing "just the right amount of naivete and exuberance".

== Business career ==
Carter moved to Westlake Village, California, in 1974. He began working in real estate, and in 1992 joined Young Realtors (today called Sotheby's International Realty) as Executive Vice President. In 2006 Sotheby's named him the Top Producer for Ventura County. Teamed with fellow real estate agent Michelle Ouellette, he has listed and sold more than one billion dollars' worth of property.

== Filmography ==
Year	Film	Role	Notes
1951	Gunplay	Chip Martin	
1951	Pistol Harvest	Johnny	
1953	Titanic	Norman Sturges	
1960	G.I. Blues	MP	Uncredited
1968	Speedway	Ted Simmons	
1971	Doctors' Wives	Lorrie's relative	Uncredited
1971	The Doris Day Show	Jerry Clark	Television episode: "Skiing Anyone?"
