= Experiment Alcatraz =

1950 film by Edward L. Cahn

- Theatrical release poster
- Directed by: Edward L. Cahn
- Screenplay by: Orville H. Hampton
- Story by: George W. George; George F. Slavin
- Produced by: Edward L. Cahn
- Starring: John Howard; Joan Dixon; Walter Kingsford; Robert Shayne
- Cinematography: Jackson Rose
- Edited by: Philip Cahn
- Music by: Irving Gertz
- Production company: Edward L. Cahn Productions
- Distributed by: RKO Pictures
- Release date: November 21, 1950
- Running time: 57 minutes
- Country: United States
- Language: English

Experiment Alcatraz is a 1950 American crime film directed by Edward L. Cahn and written by Orville H. Hampton. The film stars John Howard, Joan Dixon, Walter Kingsford and Robert Shayne. It was released on November 21, 1950 by RKO Pictures.

== Plot ==
Many Alcatraz prisoners have volunteered to ingest an experimental serum that could cure a fatal blood disease. They have been promised parole in exchange for their participation. During the experiments, notorious racketeer Barry Morgan steals nurse Joan McKenna's scissors and stabs convict Eddie Ganz to death, then escapes.

The medical tests are abandoned, and the vaccine is called a failure. Joan is upset because the serum could help her brother Dick, who is afflicted with the disease. Dr. Ross Williams, who invented the medicine, and Joan attempt to understand why Morgan had reacted in a violent manner during the experiment. Ross is beaten by one of Morgan's thugs, Duke Shaw, and threatened to cease his pursuit of Morgan.

The trail leads Ross and Joan to Lake Tahoe and lodge owner Ethel Ganz, the dead inmate's stepdaughter, who points a gun at them. Eddie had hidden $250,000 in stolen loot that she found, and she is now married to Morgan, with whom she plotted the murder and prison breakout.

Morgan and his henchmen are caught and sent to jail, and the serum is given another chance.

== Cast ==
- John Howard as Dr. Ross Williams
- Joan Dixon as Lt. Joan McKenna
- Walter Kingsford as Dr. J.P. Finley
- Lynne Carter as Ethel Ganz
- Robert Shayne as Barry Morgan
- Kim Spalding as Duke Shaw
- Sam Scar as Eddie Ganz
- Kenneth MacDonald as Col. Harris
- Dick Cogan as Dan Staley
- Frank Cady as Max Henry
- Byron Foulger as Jim Carlton
- Ralph Peters as Bartender
- Lewis Martin as Asst. District Attorney Walton
- Harry Lauter as Richard "Dick" McKenna
- Raymond Largay as Warden Keaton
