= Dorothea Neumann =

American actress (1914–1994)

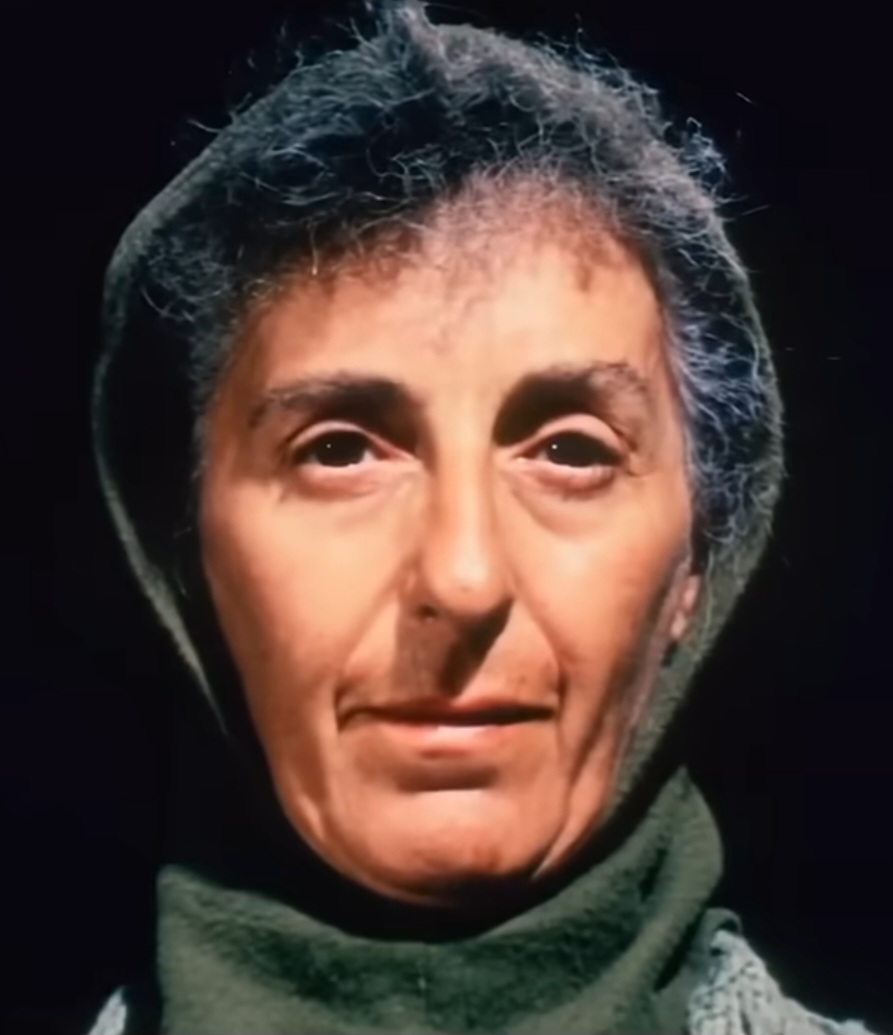
- Neumann in The Terror (1963)
- Born: January 26, 1914; New York City, New York, U.S.
- Died: May 20, 1994 (aged 80); Santa Monica, California, U.S.
- Occupation: Actress
- Years active: 1944–1991

Dorothea Neumann (January 26, 1914 – May 20, 1994), sometimes referred to as Dorothy Neumann or Dorothy Newman, was an American character actress. Her career spanned six decades and encompassed television, film, and theatre work.

== Biography ==
A native of New York, Neumann began her career in theatre. She was one of the proprietors/performers at the Turnabout Theatre in the 1940s and 1950s. She began appearing on screens in the mid-1940s, featuring in over 130 film and television projects, usually in small supporting roles. In 1962, Neumann appeared as Martha on the TV Western The Virginian in the episode titled "Big Day, Great Day". She was especially known for playing characters in the horror and fantasy genres, such as witches, crones, and gypsies. She played the murderer, Leona Durant, in S3 E22 in the episode "The Case of the Madcap Modiste" in Perry Mason.

Notable film projects included Sorry, Wrong Number, The Terror, Ghost of Dragstrip Hollow, and The Snake Pit. On the small screen, she featured in television shows such as the Twilight Zone ("Mr Bevis"), Leave It to Beaver ("Community Chest"), The Addams Family ("Morticia Joins the Ladies League"), The Man from U.N.C.L.E. ("The Iowa Scuba Affair"), 'The Andy Griffith Show ("Ellie for Council", "A Plaque for Mayberry", and "Deputy Otis", all as Rita Campbell), and Bewitched ("The Crone of Cawdor"). Neumann was a member of the Yale Puppeteers, at Turnabout Theater, Los Angeles, California, in the 1940s.

== Personal life and death ==
Neumann was Jewish. She died of pulmonary complications and was survived by two nieces, two nephews, and seven great nieces and nephews. Following her death, her cremains were given to a niece in Encinitas, California.
