= The Rounders (TV series) =

- Based on: The Rounders
- Developed by: Marion Hargrove
- Directed by: Allen Reisner
- Starring: Ron Hayes; Patrick Wayne; Chill Wills; Walker Edmiston; Strother Martin; James Brown; Jason Wingreen
- Theme music composer: Jeff Alexander
- Country of origin: United States
- Original language: English
- No. of seasons: 1
- No. of episodes: 17

Production
- Camera setup: Single-camera
- Running time: 30 minutes
- Production company: MGM Television

Original release
- Network: ABC
- Release: September 6, 1966 – January 3, 1967

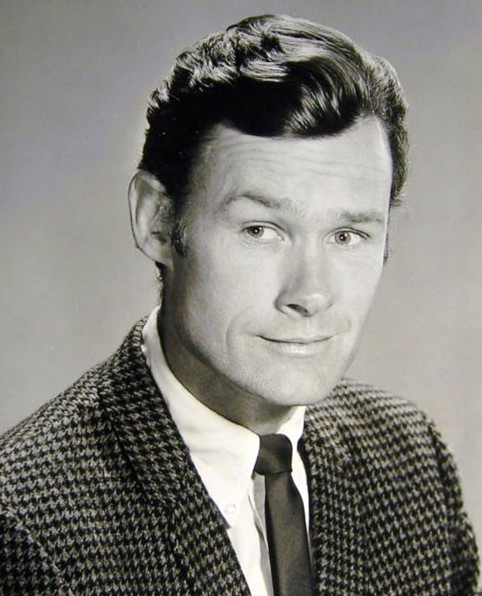
Ron Hayes (1966)

The Rounders is an American Western-style sitcom about two cowboys on the fictitious J.L. Ranch in Texas.

== Cast ==
- Ron Hayes as Ben Jones
- Chill Wills as Jim Ed Love
- Patrick Wayne as Howdy Lewis

== Episodes ==
No. in season	Title	Directed by	Written by	Original release date
1	"A Horse On Jim Ed Love"	Burt Kennedy	Marion Hargrove	September 6, 1966
Jim wants to buy a horse to resell and make a lot of money, but the horse has other plans.
2	"Frontier Frankenstein"	Hollingsworth Morse	Jack Turley	September 13, 1966
Jim is tired of Old Fooler, so he uses a remote-control training device to try to whip the ranch ponies into top-flight cutting horses.
3	"It's The Noble Thing To Do"	Hollingsworth Morse	Milton S. Gelman	September 20, 1966
Noble Vestry is known as the greatest cowpuncher in the world, so Jim enlists Noble's help to teach Howdy and Ben the reality of being a cowboy.
4	"The Moonshine Still Shines"	Alexander Singer	Lois Hire	September 27, 1966
A new sheriff is in town, at least temporarily, and as his first official duty, Jim sets out to smash the still of a moonshiner.
5	"Don't Buffalo Me"	Hollingsworth Morse	Judith Plowden & Teddi Sherman	October 4, 1966
Jim wants to own a real buffalo. Howdy and Ben want to make a lot of money. So the two cowpokes set out to satisfy Jim Ed's dream.
6	"The Scavenger Hunt"	Hollingsworth Morse	Stanley Adams & George F. Slavin	October 11, 1966
Velvet Haven, a fancy exclusive health resort just for women, has captured Howdy and Ben and put them to work at their ranch.
7	"Some Things are Not for Sale"	Alexander Singer	Marion Hargrove	October 18, 1966
Jim wants to buy Howdy's remarkably effective good-luck piece, but some things just are not for sale.
8	"It Takes Only One to Suffer"	Allen Reisner	Ed Adamson	October 25, 1966
Disgusted with life on the ranch, Ben gives Old Fooler to Howdy and takes over the operation of a one-pump gas station.
9	"Man of the Year"	Alexander Singer	John Dunkel	November 1, 1966
Jim wants to be named Man of the Year in Texas, so the ornery tightwad makes a painful effort to change his image.
10	"Four Alarm Wingding"	Alexander Singer	Harold Swanton	November 15, 1966
Jim has bought a trailer from Howdy, but the merchandise might not arrive in A-1 condition; Howdy and Ben are throwing a party for the whole darned community in the trailer.
11	"You Hold Your Temper, I'll Hold My Tongue"	Hollingsworth Morse	Milton S. Gelman	November 22, 1966
Jim promises a handsome sum if Ben Howdy will haul his new boat to Lake Love. Leave it to the two cowpokes to foul up a simple job....
12	"Horse of a Different Cutter"	Tom Gries	Milton S. Gelman	November 29, 1966
A cutting-horse contest finds Howdy and Jim backing different entrants, and using all the sneaky tricks in the book to win their bets.
13	"Polo, Anyone?"	Hollingsworth Morse	Stanley Adams & George F. Slavin	December 6, 1966
Cowpokes Ben and Howdy are plotting to put one over on their boss Jim by using an old nag that they claim is a hot polo pony.
14	"Low Moon At Hi Lo"	Tom Gries	Palmer Thompson	December 13, 1966
Jim, with all his sneaky tricks, is again the favorite to win the annual horse race, but Abbey Marstow thinks she can outfox the fox this year with her own bag of tricks.
15	"The Sweet Little Old Lady"	Hollingsworth Morse	Norman Lessing	December 20, 1966
Martha Frobish was Jim's fourth-grade teacher, and since she has shown up, she has been wreaking havoc on the ranch.
16	"Efficiency Is For The Experts"	Allen Reisner	Norman Katkov	December 27, 1966
Jim needs efficiency on the ranch, and hires a woman who is an expert at it, much to the chagrin of two lazy cowboys.
17	"What Elephants?"	Hollingsworth Morse	Gene Thompson	January 3, 1967
Cowpokes Ben and Howdy are hiding a runaway pachyderm in plain sight, and having it do their work for them while they are at it.
