= Stuart O'Brien =

American film editor (1906–2004)

- Born: May 27, 1906
- Died: January 10, 2004
- Occupation: Film editor

Stuart O'Brien (27 May 1906 – 10 January 2004) was an American film editor. He worked on B-movies, primarily low budget horror and exploitation films. Some notable examples are Roger Corman's The Terror (1963) and Francis Ford Coppola's Dementia 13 (1963).
