= Titanic (1953 film) =

1953 film by Jean Negulesco

- Original film poster
- Directed by: Jean Negulesco
- Written by: Charles Brackett; Richard L. Breen; Walter Reisch
- Produced by: Charles Brackett
- Starring: Clifton Webb; Barbara Stanwyck; Robert Wagner; Audrey Dalton; Harper Carter; Thelma Ritter; Brian Aherne; Richard Basehart
- Cinematography: Joseph MacDonald
- Edited by: Louis R. Loeffler
- Music by: Sol Kaplan
- Distributed by: 20th Century Fox
- Release dates: April 18, 1953 (Los Angeles); May 27, 1953 (New York)
- Running time: 98 minutes
- Country: United States
- Language: English
- Budget: $1,805,000
- Box office: $2,250,000 (US)

Titanic is a 1953 American drama film directed by Jean Negulesco and starring Clifton Webb and Barbara Stanwyck. Its plot follows an estranged couple travelling on the maiden voyage of the RMS Titanic in April 1912. The film was Twentieth Century-Fox's first about Titanic; the studio would later release the 1997 film of the same title internationally while Paramount Pictures handled the North American distribution.

== Plot ==
Richard Sturges, a wealthy expatriate in Europe, buys a third-class ticket for the maiden voyage of the Titanic from a Basque emigrant. Once aboard, he seeks his runaway wife Julia and discovers that she is trying to take their two unsuspecting children, 18-year-old Annette and 13-year-old Norman, to her hometown of Mackinac Island, Michigan, to rear them as ordinary Americans rather than as privileged elitists in Europe. The passengers also include the wealthy Maude Young, social-climbing Earl Meeker, 20-year-old Purdue University tennis player Giff Rogers and George Healey, a Catholic priest who has been defrocked for alcoholism.

As the ship is prepared for departure, Sanderson, the company representative, suggests to Captain Edward J. Smith that a record-setting speedy passage would be welcomed. One night on the bridge, Smith asks Second Officer Charles Lightoller about a note from First Officer William Murdoch about binoculars, and Lightoller explains that the ship has very few, just enough for the bridge, but none for the lookouts.

When Annette learns of Julia's intentions, she insists on returning to Europe with Richard on the next ship as soon as they reach America. Julia concedes that Annette is old enough to make her own decisions, but she insists on keeping custody of Norman. This angers Richard, forcing her to reveal that Norman is not his son, but rather the result of a brief dalliance after a bitter argument. Richard declares he makes no claim to Norman and does not want to see him again.

Richard joins Maude, Earl and George Widener in the lounge to play auction bridge. The next morning, when Norman reminds him of a shuffleboard game that they had arranged, he coldly rebuffs him. Meanwhile, Giff falls for Annette at first glance. At first, she repulses his brash advances, but she eventually warms to him. That night, Giff, Annette and a group of young people sing and play the piano in the dining salon, while Captain Smith watches from a corner table. Lightoller expresses his concern to Captain Smith about the ship's speed when they receive two messages from other ships warning of iceberg sightings near their route. However, Smith assures him that there is no danger, as the sea is clear and the track is south of the reported icefield.

The lookouts spot an iceberg dead ahead; the crew tries to steer clear of it, but it gashes the side of the bow below the waterline and water breaches the hull. When Richard finds Captain Smith, he insists on the truth, and Smith informs him that the ship is going to sink and that there are not enough lifeboats to save everyone on board. Richard tells his family to dress warmly but properly, and they head outside. Richard and Julia have a tearful reconciliation on the boat deck and he places her, along with Annette and Norman, into a lifeboat. Unnoticed by Julia, Norman volunteers to surrender his seat to an old woman and boards the ship to find Richard. When one of the lines becomes tangled, preventing another boat from being lowered, Giff climbs down and fixes it, only to lose his grip and fall into the water. He is dragged onto the boat and his head bandaged, starts rowing.

Meeker disguises himself as a woman to board a lifeboat, but Maude notices his shoes and unmasks him in front of the others. George Healey, having pulled himself together, heads into grave danger in a boiler room to either save or comfort trapped crewmen.

As the boilers of the Titanic explode several times, Norman finds Richard, who tells Norman that he has been proud of him every day of his life. They join the passengers and crew in singing the hymn "Nearer, My God, to Thee". As the boilers explode twice more, the Titanic's bow submerges, pivoting her stern high into the air before she rapidly slides into the icy water; Richard, Norman, and Healey are lost. As dawn breaks, the survivors are rowing in the lifeboats, awaiting rescue.

== Cast ==
=== Historical characters ===
- Brian Aherne as Captain Edward J. Smith
- William Johnstone as John Jacob Astor IV
- Frances Bergen as Madeleine Astor
- Edmund Purdom as Second Officer Charles Lightoller
- Barry Bernard as First Officer William McMaster Murdoch
- Charles B. Fitzsimons as Henry Tingle Wilde
- Ashley Cowan as Jack Phillips
- Roy Gordon as Isidor Straus
- Helen Van Tuyl as Ida Straus
- Camillo Guercio as Benjamin Guggenheim
- Harry Cording as Chief Engineer Joseph Bell
- Dennis Frazer as Harold Bride
- Alan Marston as Quartermaster Robert Hichens
- Richard Basehart as Father Thomas Byles
- Guy Standing Jr. as George Dunton Widener

=== Fictional characters ===
- Clifton Webb as Richard Ward Sturges
- Barbara Stanwyck as Julia Sturges
- Audrey Dalton as Annette Sturges
- Harper Carter as Norman Sturges
- Robert Wagner as Gifford "Giff" Rogers
- Thelma Ritter as Maude Young
- Richard Basehart as George S. Healey
- Allyn Joslyn as Earl Meeker
- James Todd as Sandy Comstock
- Salvador Baguez as Jean Pablo Uzcadum
- Marta Mitrovich as Mrs. Jean Uzcadum
- James O'Hara as Devlin, Lookout
- Lee Graham as Symons, Lookout
- Mae Marsh as Woman to whom Norman gives up his seat
- Christopher Severn as Flag messenger
- Gordon Richards as Mr. Webster, Manager of Clothing Shop
- William Cottrell as Barry, Bar Steward
- Ivis Goulding as Emma, First Class Stewardess
- Anthony Eustrel as Mr. Sanderson, White Star Representative
- John Dodsworth as Stoker Exclaiming 'For God's Sake!'
- David Hoffman as Ship's Tailor

Cast notes:

- Michael Rennie provides the voice of the End Narrator.
- Mae Marsh had been dressed by Titanic survivor Lucy, Lady Duff-Gordon in a 1917 film.

== Production ==
=== Development ===
Walter Reisch recalled that studio head Darryl F. Zanuck summoned him and Charles Brackett and told them, "I have Clifton Webb under contract, and we have CinemaScope, and I now want to do something big. ... Don't make Clifton a clown. I want him to start a new career as a character actor. Use all the young people we have on the lot, like Audrey Dalton and Robert Wagner." In response, Reisch proposed the Titanic idea and pitched Webb as one of the 25 multimillionaires who died during the sinking of the ship. He said that the film would be "60 percent truth, completely documentary", based on real historical accounts. Reisch said that it was fellow writer Richard Breen who proposed the character of an alcoholic priest.

Brackett, who cowrote and produced the film, told the press that some of the stories were discarded "because they are too fantastic for movie audiences to believe". At one point, the film was to be titled Nearer My God to Thee.

Filming began in late October 1952 and wrapped in early December 1952.

The 28-foot model of the Titanic used for filming is currently on display at the Maritime Museum at Battleship Cove in Fall River, Massachusetts.

=== Casting ===
In a September 1952 news article, it was reported that Terry Moore was set to play the role of Annette Sturges if she could finish production of Man on a Tightrope on time.

== Historical accuracy ==
Author Rupert Matthews writes: "[Titanic] soon became famous for its many inaccuracies. These ranged from the minor - having the wrong instruments in the ship's band and putting the crew in Royal Navy uniforms - to the more serious such as having (the ship's boilers explode), giving the ship an evacuation alarm, having Captain Smith (be in the dining room) when the ship hit the iceberg". Some historical figures are given fictitious names; Maude Young is based on real-life Titanic survivor Margaret Brown. Sanderson, the company representative, seems to be based on J. Bruce Ismay but does not accompany the voyage. In addition, the voyage was not sold to capacity but was barely more than half-booked. Author Linda Koldau writes: "[...] the Titanic was far from being sold out and an additional passenger would easily have been able to purchase a first-class ticket...Yet if one accepts that historical accuracy is not the point here, since the story is not at all that of the Titanic, it is a perfectly functioning script". Titanic experts Fitch, Layton and Wormstedt write:

While the film openly claimed a high level of accuracy based on the transcripts of the two Inquiries into the sinking, it fell far short of that. A majority of the events portrayed were either dramatically embellished or simply inaccurate.

Greaser George Alexander Prangnell, who was a member of the engineering crew of the Titanic and was rescued on board Collapsible Boat B, strongly disliked the film, calling it an "eyewash".

== Reception ==
In a contemporary review for The New York Times, critic A. H. Weiler called Titanic "a sometimes moving and often exciting drama" with parallels to the Grand Hotel formula of multiple concurrent plotlines and wrote: "As a dramatization of an historic tragedy 'Titanic' is adult and restrained about fiction, heroism and history. ... While the destiny of the Titanic is a foregone conclusion known to many, a fact that robs the film of some suspense, director Jean Negulesco and his associates have generated a mounting tension through careful use of such facts as the need for more binoculars and the fouling up of wireless messages of icebergs ahead."

Reviewer Philip K. Scheuer of the Los Angeles Times praised the "tremendously moving total impact of this extraordinary film" and Negulesco's "beautifully moderated direction" of "an inspired cast".

Variety reviewed the film positively, writing: "[B]y the time the initial 45 or 50 minutes are out of the way, the impending disaster begins to take a firm grip on the imagination and builds a compelling expectancy".

Pauline Kael panned the film's special effects, writing that "the actual sinking looks like a nautical tragedy on the pond in Central Park".

According to the film aggregator website Rotten Tomatoes, the film holds a 92% "Fresh" rating, based on 10 reviews.

=== Awards and nominations ===
The film won the Academy Award for Best Original Screenplay, and was nominated for Best Art Direction. Negulesco's direction was nominated for a Directors Guild of America Award, and Stanwyck was nominated for a Golden Laurel Award for Top Female Dramatic Performance.

== See also ==
- List of films about the Titanic
