= Mr. Bevis =

- The Twilight Zone episode
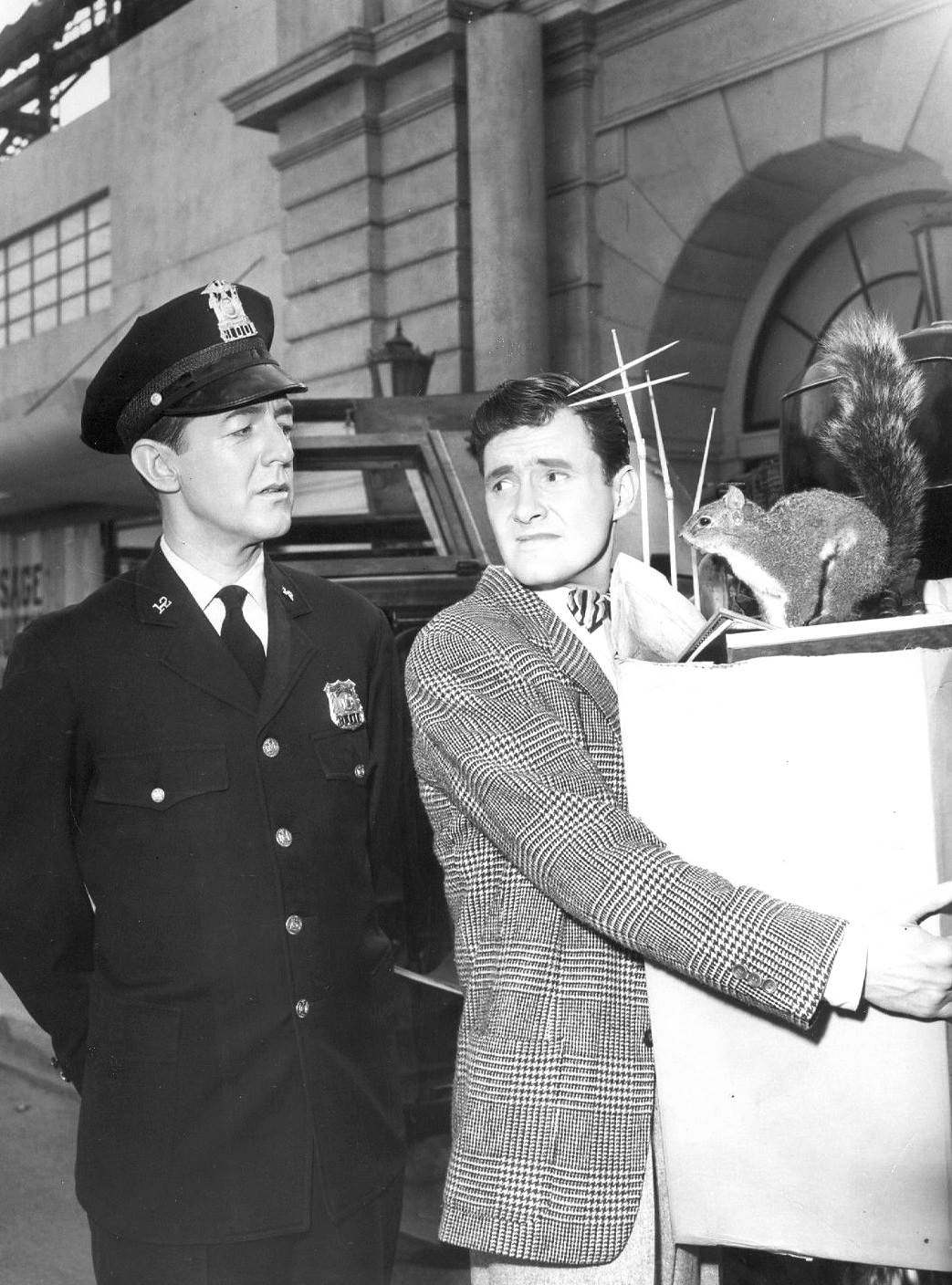
- Episode no.: Season 1 Episode 33
- Directed by: William Asher
- Written by: Rod Serling
- Production code: 173-3631
- Original air date: June 3, 1960

Guest appearances
- Orson Bean as James B. W. Bevis; Henry Jones as J. Hardy Hempstead; Charles Lane as Mr. Peckinpaugh; Florence MacMichael as Margaret; William Schallert as Policeman; Dorothea Neumann as Land Lady; Vito Scotti as Tony, the Fruit Peddler; Horace McMahon as Bartender; House Peters Jr. as Policeman writing ticket; Coleen O'Sullivan as Michelle; Timmy Cletro as the boy

Episode chronology
← Previous "A Passage for Trumpet"	Next → "The After Hours"
- The Twilight Zone (1959 TV series, season 1)

"Mr. Bevis" is episode thirty-three of the American television anthology series The Twilight Zone. It first aired on June 3, 1960 on CBS. This episode is one of only four to feature the "blinking eye" opening sequence, and the first to feature the opening narration which would be used (with minor changes) for every episode throughout seasons 2 and 3. The episode was an unsuccessful television pilot.

== Opening narration ==
In the parlance of the twentieth century, this is an oddball. His name is James B. W. Bevis, and his tastes lean toward stuffed animals, zither music, professional football, Charles Dickens, moose heads, carnivals, dogs, children, and young ladies. Mr. Bevis is accident prone, a little vague, a little discombooberated [sic], with a life that possesses all the security of a floating crap game. But this can be said of our Mr. Bevis: without him, without his warmth, without his kindness, the world would be a considerably poorer place, albeit perhaps a little saner.

The narration continues when Bevis walks up to his car.

Should it not be obvious by now, James B. W. Bevis is a fixture in his own private, optimistic, hopeful little world, a world which has long ceased being surprised by him. James B. W. Bevis, on whom Dame Fortune will shortly turn her back, but not before she gives him a paste in the mouth. Mr. James B. W. Bevis, just one block away from the Twilight Zone.

== Plot ==
Mr. Bevis loses his job, gets tickets on his car (which inadvertently hooks bumpers with another vehicle and, once pulled away, flips over), and gets evicted from his apartment – all in one day. Bevis then meets and gets assistance from his guardian angel, one J. Hardy Hempstead. Bevis gets to start the day over again, but there is a catch: in order to continue in his new life, Bevis must make some changes, including no strange clothes, no loud zither music, in effect no longer the well-liked neighborhood goofball.

He accepts, and the first thing he notices is that his personal transportation is now an Austin-Healey sportscar instead of his previous jalopy, a soot-spewing 1924 Rickenbacker. He later discovers that he is a success at work, and his rent is paid. As the day goes on, he realizes that all of his eccentricities, and the affection from his fellow citizens, were the things that made him happy. Bevis asks that things be returned to the way they were. Hempstead obliges, initially warning Bevis that he will still have no job, car, or apartment. However, perhaps moved by the warmth people have for Bevis, and the man's genuine kindness, the angel arranges for him to get his old jalopy back.

Later, Mr. Bevis is shown finishing his fifth shot of whiskey, and he pays his total tab of $5.00 with one bill. He then leaves the bar, and finds his Rickenbacker is parked in front of a fire hydrant. When Bevis is about to be ticketed for this infraction, the hydrant suddenly disappears and reappears next to the officer's motorcycle. "J. Hardy Hempstead" is still watching over Bevis.

== Closing narration ==
Mr. James B. W. Bevis, who believes in a magic all his own. The magic of a child's smile, the magic of liking and being liked, the strange and wondrous mysticism that is the simple act of living. Mr. James B. W. Bevis, species of twentieth-century male, who has his own private and special Twilight Zone.
