= Max Evans (writer) =

American writer (1924–2020)

- Born: August 29, 1924; Ropesville, Texas, U.S.
- Died: August 26, 2020 (aged 95)
- Occupation: Writer
- Writing career
- Genres: Western fiction; non-fiction

Max Evans (August 29, 1924 – August 26, 2020) was an American writer best known for Western fiction. He was the author of more than 27 fiction and nonfiction books over a 60-year writing career. His first novel, The Rounders, was published in 1960 and was made into a film in 1965. In 1998, his novel The Hi-Lo Country was also made into a film. His last book, The King of Taos, was published in 2020. Evans received several awards from the Western Writers of America and was inducted into the WWA Hall of Fame in 2015.

Evans was born into a ranching family in Ropesville, Texas, and grew up in West Texas and northeastern New Mexico. He enlisted in the U.S. Army during World War II and participated in the Normandy landings in 1944. After the war, he returned to New Mexico to find that the traditional cowboy way of life with which he was familiar was dying out. He tried various occupations including painting before turning to literature. He moved to Albuquerque, New Mexico in 1967 and lived there for the rest of his life. Evans was known for his storytelling abilities and colorful personality and had several notable friends including director Sam Peckinpah, who gave him a small role in the 1970 film The Ballad of Cable Hogue.

Evans' life was detailed in the 2004 biography Ol' Max Evans: The First Thousand Years by Slim Randles and a 2017 documentary by the same name.
