= The Hi-Lo Country =

1998 film by Stephen Frears

- Theatrical release poster
- Directed by: Stephen Frears
- Written by: Walon Green
- Based on: The Hi Lo Country by Max Evans
- Produced by: Tim Bevan; Barbara De Fina; Eric Fellner; Martin Scorsese
- Starring: Woody Harrelson; Billy Crudup; Patricia Arquette; Cole Hauser; James Gammon; Penélope Cruz; Sam Elliott
- Cinematography: Oliver Stapleton
- Edited by: Masahiro Hirakubo
- Music by: Carter Burwell
- Production companies: PolyGram Filmed Entertainment; Working Title Films
- Distributed by: Gramercy Pictures (United States); Universal Pictures (United Kingdom)
- Release date: December 30, 1998
- Running time: 114 minutes
- Countries: United States; United Kingdom
- Language: English
- Box office: $166,082

The Hi-Lo Country is a 1998 neo-Western film directed by Stephen Frears, starring Billy Crudup, Penélope Cruz, Woody Harrelson, Cole Hauser, Sam Elliott, Patricia Arquette, Enrique Castillo, and Katy Jurado. It is set in post-World War II New Mexico and is based on the Western novel by Max Evans.

== Plot ==
Pete Calder sets out one morning, reflecting on his intention to kill someone. As he drives, he thinks back on what led him to this point.

When he was young growing up in the Hi-Lo, New Mexico, Pete met and befriended Big Boy Matson, a cowboy. Soon after becoming best friends, World War II broke out, and both decide to volunteer for military service. While Big Boy is away, Pete returns from the war sooner and is allowed to work for corporate cattle baron Jim Ed Love, but declines. He also meets and begins to fall in love with Mona Birk, the wife of Jim Ed's foreman Les Birk, despite also carrying on a relationship with local Josepha O'Neil.

Big Boy returns home from the war, expecting to return to his old life, and finds that half the town is employed by Jim Ed. Hanging on to the mythic ideals of the American West, Big Boy and Pete team up with an old-time rancher Hoover Young to raise cattle the cowboy way.

Big Boy has an antagonistic relationship with Jim Ed, and declines offers to be bought out. Things are peaceful for a while, until Big Boy begins an affair with Mona. Out of friendship with Big Boy, Pete resolves to forget his feelings for her and devotes himself to Josepha. Meanwhile, the tension between Big Boy and Les begins to grow.

As Pete continuously comes into contact with Mona, he becomes more obsessed with her. Josepha confronts Pete about his friend's affair and homewrecking, and in the heat of the exchange, Pete reveals his jealousy of Big Boy's relationship. Josepha leaves dejected, and Pete becomes increasingly depressed by both his unrequited feelings and his dishonesty with those he cares about.

Finally, Pete confronts Mona and asks her to end the affair for the sake of Big Boy and her reputation, but Mona counters that she knows he is infatuated with her. Later at a town dance, Les sees Big Boy and Mona dancing and pulls a gun to shoot Big Boy, but has the gun knocked out of his hand by a crowd member and is beaten brutally by Big Boy. Mona follows Big Boy outside and kisses him.

Big Boy, Mona, Pete, and Josepha spend the rest of the night together, and after visiting a Mexican witch named Meesa, Pete takes Mona outside and has sex with her, but Big Boy is too drunk to notice. Josepha comes out and brings Mona back inside, but does not confront Pete. She later tells Pete to "tell Big Boy before she does, or he'll kill you." Pete reflects on having lost the fear of death. In the end, Big Boy's younger brother, Little Boy, ends up impulsively killing Big Boy after a brawl after feeling humiliated by his older brother.

At present, Pete sits in his car outside the church holding Big Boy's memorial. After the funeral, he is given a talking-to by the Matson boys' mother, who tells him to spare Little Boy, and that she knew since Big Boy was born that his life would end in violence. Pete approaches Little Boy and tells him he is honoring Mrs. Matson's wishes, but that he will kill him if Little Boy ever slanders Big Boy. He walks off with Mona, who is pregnant, who tells him she told Big Boy about their sexual encounter. They say goodbye, and Pete heads off to start a new life in California with a hint of reuniting with Josepha, as Mona notes that she had previously moved there.

== Cast ==
- Woody Harrelson as Big Boy Matson
- Billy Crudup as Pete Calder
- Patricia Arquette as Mona Birk
- Cole Hauser as Little Boy Matson
- Penélope Cruz as Josepha O'Neil
- Darren Burrows as Billy Harte
- Jacob Vargas as Delfino Mondragon
- James Gammon as Hoover Young
- Lane Smith as Steve Shaw
- Katy Jurado as Meesa
- Sam Elliott as Jim Ed Love
- John Diehl as Les Birk
- Enrique Castillo as Levi Gomez
- Rosaleen Linehan as Mrs. Matson

Other appearances include musician Rose Maddox as Big Boy's Grandmother, rodeo announcer Bob Tallman as himself, and Chris O'Connell, Leon Rausch, Connie Smith, Marty Stuart, and Don Walser as the band.

== Reception ==
The film was regarded by critics and film festivals as an example of the "classic" Western movie genre.

Bob Graham of the San Francisco Chronicle said, "The traditional settings of Westerns are honored: the saloon, the dance hall, the rodeo, the cattle drive, the snowstorm. Hi-Lo is not only the name of the high-country flatlands where the story takes place, it is also a poker game, and that Western cliche is given a good spin, too."

Stephen Holden of The New York Times said, "In its best moments, the movie feels like an epic hybrid of Red River and The Last Picture Show."

The score by Carter Burwell, the Western swing songs of Floyd Tillman, Vaughn Monroe, Eddy Arnold, Merle Travis, Tex Williams, and Hank Williams, and sequence performances by Don Walser and Leon Rausch were well regarded.

== Awards ==
- Winner, Silver Bear for Best Director (Stephen Frears) – 49th Berlin International Film Festival
- Nominated, Golden Bear Award – Berlin International Film Festival
- Nominated, Best Actress (Penélope Cruz) – ALMA Awards
- Nominated, Best Actress (Katy Jurado) – ALMA Awards
- Nominated, Best Supporting Actor (Enrique Castillo) – ALMA Awards
- Winner, Best Breakthrough Performance (Billy Crudup) – National Board of Review
- Winner, Bronze Wrangler Award (Best Motion Picture of the year) – Western Heritage Awards
- Winner, Best Screenplay – Drama (Walon Green) – Western Writers of America

== Home media ==
On December 18, 2012, Shout! Factory rereleased the film on DVD.

Kino Lorber will release the film on Blu-ray in February 2026.
