= Pistol Harvest =

1951 film by Lesley Selander

- Directed by: Lesley Selander
- Written by: Norman Houston
- Produced by: Herman Schlom
- Starring: Tim Holt; Joan Dixon
- Cinematography: J. Roy Hunt
- Edited by: Douglas Biggs
- Music by: C. Bakaleinikoff
- Distributed by: RKO Pictures
- Release date: July 27, 1951
- Running time: 60 mins
- Country: United States
- Language: English
- Budget: $93,000

Pistol Harvest is a 1951 Western film starring Tim Holt and released by RKO Pictures.

== Plot ==
In the Old West, abandoned siblings Johnny and Felice seek help in the desert. Cattle rancher Terry Moran rescues Felice and raises her to adulthood. Fifteen years later, Felice has fallen in love with Tim, one of Moran's cowhands. Tim and his sidekick Chito Rafferty hunt two cattle thieves named Jack and Andy. The thieves apologize, claiming they are hungry and need money. Tim gives them money, but Chito remains suspicious. At a bank, Tim and Chito withdraw $30,000 in cash for as payment for cattle that Moran had sold. The banker, Elias Norton, plans to steal the money. He hires Jack and Andy to unsuccessfully ambush Tim and Chito.

Norton asks Moran to lend him the $30,000. Moran refuses, intending to purchase land for Felice. Norton kills Moran, witnessed by Norton's bank employee, Prouty. Tim, Felice and Chito discover Moran's body and Tim suspects Jack and Andy of murder. Tim and Chito chase Jack and Andy, and Jack is caught but Andy escapes. Jack denies the murder, but Tim and the others do not believe him. Jack is held captive at the Moran ranch while Chito summons the sheriff. Andy frees Jack and they engage Tim in a gunfight that wounds Jack. As Chito and the sheriff pursue Jack and Andy, Felice concludes that Jack is her brother Johnny after she and Tim find a gold coin with Johnny's name engraved.

Andy leaves Jack to find a doctor. Tim finds Chito, who split from the sheriff, and they locate and subdue Jack. Tim reunites Jack with Felice, and Jack admits that he and Andy were connected to Norton. To destroy evidence of his criminal activity, Norton sets fire to his warehouse, and he and Prouty leave town on Norton's wagon. Tim and Chito arrive at the warehouse in time to extinguish the fire and they find Andy's body. They pursue Norton and Prouty and capture them. Tim collects Jack at the ranch and they leave to attend Norton's trial. Chito meets them after joking with Felice about his romantic tendencies.

== Cast ==
- Tim Holt as Tim
- Richard Martin as Chito Rafferty
- Joan Dixon as Felice Moran
- Edward Hearn as Terry Moran
- Mauritz Hugo as Elias Norton
- Harper Carter as Johnny (child)
- Robert Clarke as Jack/Johnny (adult)
- Robert J. Wilke as Andy
- William Griffith as Prouty
- Joan Freeman as Felice (child)
