= Sandra Knight =

American actress, painter and writer (born 1939)

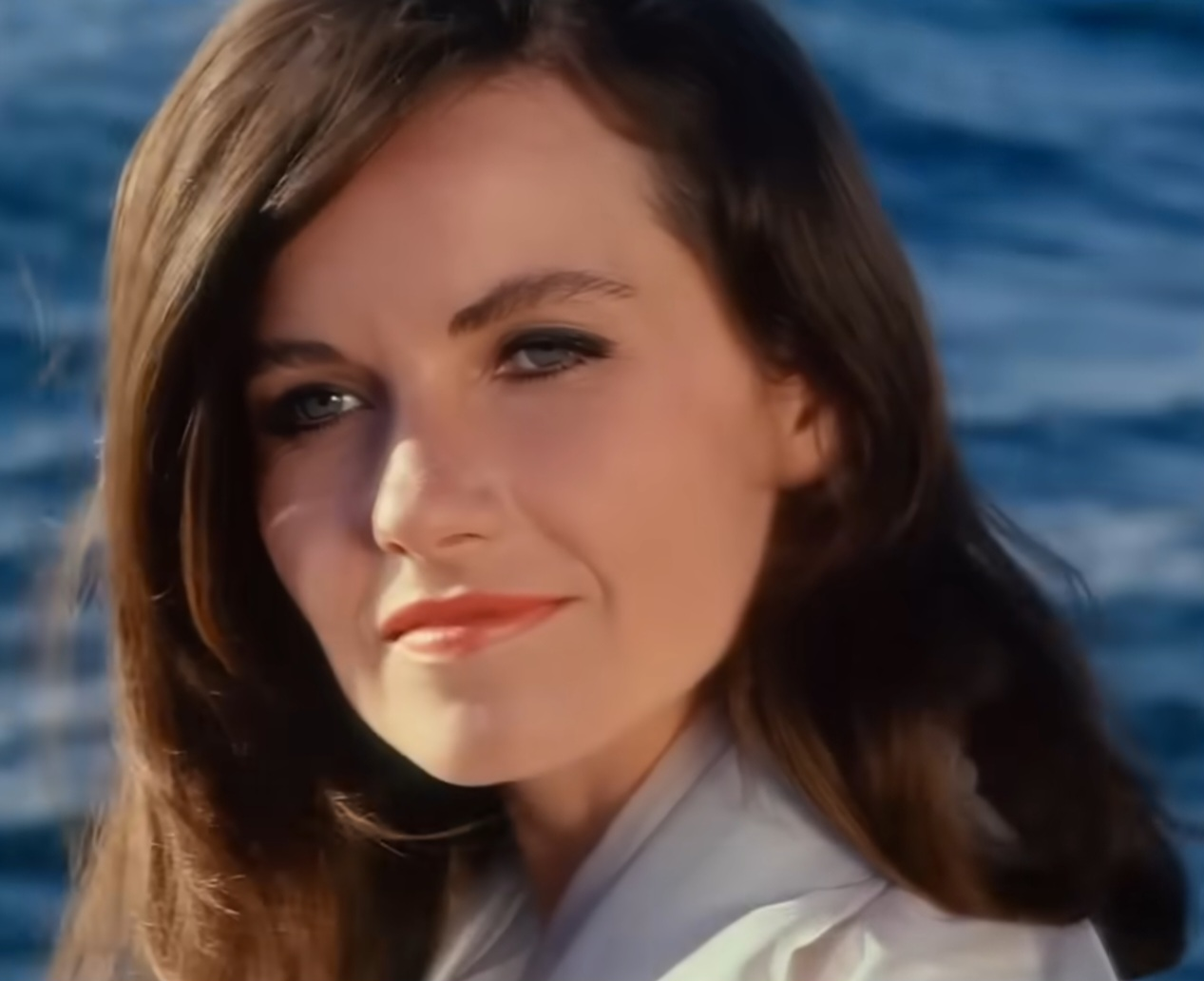
- Knight in The Terror (1963)
- Born: Sandra D. Knight
- Occupation: Actress
- Years active: 1958–1966
- Spouses: Jack Nicholson (m. 1962; div. 1968); John Arthur Stephenson (m. 1982)
- Children: 1

Sandra D. Knight is an American retired actress.

== Acting career ==
=== Film ===
Knight acted in low-budget films of the 1950s and 1960s, such as Frankenstein's Daughter (1958), The Terror (1963) starring Boris Karloff and Jack Nicholson, where she plays an evil spirit, and Tower of London (1962) with Vincent Price. Her most well-known film is the bootleg moonshine action epic Thunder Road (1958) starring Robert Mitchum.

=== Television ===
She appeared as a guest star in numerous television series, including the episode "The Legacy" in the Western Tales of Wells Fargo, an episode of the science fiction anthology series One Step Beyond called "The Burning Girl"; an episode titled "Knock on Any Tombstone" of the Warner Bros. detective show Bourbon Street Beat; the episode "The Search for Cope Borden" in the Western The Man from Blackhawk; the episode "Home Town", in the Western Tate; the Western The Rebel; the episodes "Drifter's Gold" and "The Last Journey" in the Western Laramie; the Western Wagon Train in the episode "The Bettina May Story"; the episode "Separate Checks" in the detective show Surfside 6; the episode "A Time to Run" of the Western The Tall Man; and the episode "The Yellow Badge of Courage" in the sitcom I'm Dickens, He's Fenster.

== Personal life ==
In 1962, Knight married fellow actor Jack Nicholson, with whom she had worked on The Terror, they separated in 1966 and divorced in 1968. They have a daughter, Jennifer. In 1982, Knight married her second husband John Arthur Stephenson. Since the 1960s she has been a student and teacher of The Infinite Way spiritual practice. She lives in Hawaii.

== Selected filmography ==
=== Film ===
- Thunder Road (1958)
- Frankenstein's Daughter (1958)
- Tower of London (1962)
- The Terror (1963)
- Blood Bath (1966)

=== Television ===
- State Trooper (1958)
- Tales of Wells Fargo (1958)
- One Step Beyond (1959)
- Bourbon Street Beat (1960)
- Goodyear Theatre (1960)
- The Man from Blackhawk (1960)
- Tate (1960)
- The Rebel (1960–1961)
- Laramie (1960–1961)
- Wagon Train (1961)
- Surfside 6 (1961)
- The Tall Man (1962)
- I'm Dickens, He's Fenster (1962)
