= Ron Hayes =

American actor (1929–2004)

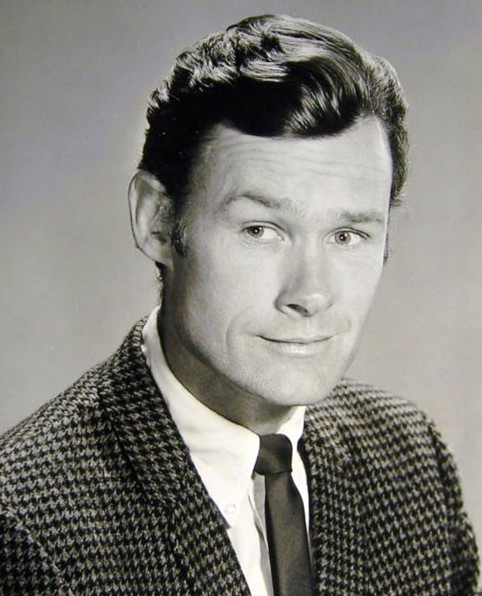
- Hayes in 1966
- Born: February 26, 1929; San Francisco, California, U.S.
- Died: October 1, 2004 (aged 75); Malibu, California, U.S.
- Education: Stanford University
- Occupations: Actor: The Everglades, The Rounders, Lassie, Coors Western Outdoorsman
- Spouses: Joan Sturgess (married 1952, divorced 1962; Betty Endicott (married 1964, divorced 1974; Caroline Muir (married 1982, divorced 1986); Carol Capek (married 1996, divorced 2000)
- Children: 3

Ronald G. Hayes (February 26, 1929 – October 1, 2004) was an American television actor, who as an activist in the environmental movement, worked for the establishment of the first Earth Day, observed on April 22, 1970. He was a member of the Sierra Club and a founder of the ecological interest group Wilderness World.

On television, Hayes guest-starred in Bat Masterson, in a recurring role as Wyatt Earp (1959 to 1961) and again as Jeremy French (1960). Hayes played Owens in "Rawhide" S2 E8 "Incident of the Haunted Hills" which aired 11/5/1959. He played the doomed suitor Paul Bradley in "Wanted: Dead or Alive" S2 E10 "Reckless" which aired 11/6/1959.

Hayes was a regularly seen face, in various characters showing a wide range of acting skill, on Gunsmoke.

He also played a blinded U.S. Army captain in an episode of Don't Call Me Charlie! (1962), and he also co-starred in the ABC Western comedy The Rounders (1966) and portrayed Lincoln Vail in the syndicated adventure series The Everglades (1961). Hayes also guest-starred in two episodes of The High Chaparral and two episodes of Death Valley Days as the editor of the newspaper reporting Custer's last stand and the Devil's Bar. Hayes also appeared on Flipper in the 2 part episode The Ditching.

== Television roles ==
- Cheyenne as Durango Kid (1957) in "Town of Fear" Also as Cote Martin, in the episode “Reprieve” (1959), co-starring Connie Stevens and Paul Lukather.
- Tombstone Territory as outlaw Chick Umbir (1959) in "The Day of Amnesty"
- Wagon Train as Whitey (1960) in "The Cathy Eckhart Story"
- The Rifleman as Bruce (1960) in "Six Years and a Day"
- Bat Masterson as Jeremy French (1960) and in a recurring role as Wyatt Earp (1959-1961)
- Rawhide (1961) as Owens in S2:E8, "Incident of the Haunted Hills"
- Rawhide (1962) as Frank Louden in S5:E6, "Incident of the Four Horsemen"
- The Virginian as Marshal Brett Cole (1963)
- Gunsmoke as Jud Sorell (1963-S8E28) and in a 1970 episode,"The Judas Gun" as gunfighter Boyd Avery
- Flipper as Mac Newton, credited Mac (Pilot), in "The Ditching part 1 & 2" (S2E07 and S2E08) 1965
- Bonanza as Jarred (1966) in "Bridesgroom" (S8E13) and as Donnie Buckler (1967) in “Night of Reckoning” (S9E5)
- Hawaii Five-O as Laughlin (1973-S5:E18) in "The Odd Lot Caper"
