= Bunco Squad =

1950 film by Herbert I. Leeds

- Theatrical release poster
- Directed by: Herbert I. Leeds
- Screenplay by: George Callahan
- Based on: Fortuneer by Reginald Taviner
- Produced by: Lewis J. Rachmil
- Starring: Robert Sterling; Joan Dixon; Ricardo Cortez; Dante
- Cinematography: Henry Freulich
- Edited by: Desmond Marquette
- Music by: Paul Sawtell
- Production company: RKO Pictures
- Distributed by: RKO Pictures
- Release date: August 2, 1950 (Kansas City)
- Running time: 67 minutes
- Country: United States
- Language: English

Bunco Squad is a 1950 American crime film directed by Herbert I. Leeds and written by George Callahan. The film stars Robert Sterling, Joan Dixon, Ricardo Cortez and Dante (Harry August Jansen). It was released on September 1, 1950 by RKO Pictures.

== Cast ==
- Robert Sterling as Det. Sgt. Steve Johnson
- Joan Dixon as Grace Bradshaw / Bride in film
- Ricardo Cortez as Tony Weldon
- Douglas Fowley as Det. Sgt. Mack McManus
- Elisabeth Risdon as Jessica Royce
- Marguerite Churchill as Barbara Madison
- John Kellogg as Fred Reed
- Bernadene Hayes as Princess Liane
- Robert Bice as Drake
- Vivien Oakland as Annie Cobb
- Harry August Jansen as Dante the Magician
- Frank Wilcox as Dr. Largo (uncredited)

== Production ==
Bunco Squad was filmed over the course of several weeks in February 1950.

Harry August Jansen, a famous magician for more than 50 years and known professionally as Dante, emerged from retirement to appear in the film and assist as a technical advisor. Jansen donated his own spiritualistic props, valued at more than $50,000, for use in the film. Marguerite Churchill, who plays Barbara Madison, appears in her first screen role since 1938, when she retired to marry actor George O'Brien. Joan Dixon, a 20-year-old tall brunette who had studied for one year under top Hollywood scout Florence Enright, made her screen debut in Bunco Squad.

Producer Lewis J. Rachmill consulted with a palmist, psychic adviser, handwriting analyst, phrenologist, astrologer and "character consultant" while preparing for the film. After the consultations, he said: "My picture will tell all, and that's a lot more than these phony seers did."

== Reception ==
Bunco Squad was first shown in Kansas City, Missouri on August 2, 1950 and was released nationwide as a second feature.

A reviewer in the Daily Times of Davenport, Iowa wrote that the film "could have been cut in half with no damage to the plot".
