= Tower of London (1962 film) =

1962 film by Roger Corman

- Theatrical release poster
- Directed by: Roger Corman
- Screenplay by: Leo Gordon; F. Amos Powell; James B. Gordon
- Story by: Leo Gordon; F. Amos Powell
- Produced by: Gene Corman
- Starring: Vincent Price; Michael Pate; Joan Freeman; Robert Brown
- Cinematography: Archie R. Dalzell
- Edited by: Ronald Sinclair
- Music by: Michael Anderson
- Production company: Admiral Pictures
- Distributed by: United Artists
- Release date: 24 October 1962
- Running time: 79 minutes
- Country: United States
- Language: English
- Budget: $200,000

Tower of London is a 1962 American historical gothic melodrama film directed by Roger Corman, produced by Gene Corman, and starring Vincent Price, Michael Pate, Joan Freeman, and Robert Brown. It tells a highly fictionalized account of the rise to power and eventual downfall of King Richard III of England, freely combining elements derived from the plots of Shakespeare's plays Richard III and Macbeth.

Aside from the historical setting, the movie is not connected to the 1939 film of the same name featuring Price, though the film does reuse some footage of its battle scenes.

The film was released by United Artists on October 23, 1962.

== Plot ==
In 1483 England, Richard, the Duke of Gloucester, is dismayed when his dying brother King Edward IV names their brother George, Duke of Clarence as Protector to his young son and heir, Prince Edward. Richard wants the position himself, to become de facto ruler after his brother's death. He secretly stabs George to death with a dagger bearing the crest of the Woodville family, framing the dying king's in-laws. Richard is now named Protector. His wife Anne approves of his crime and encourages him to take the throne for himself.

After the death of King Edward, Richard tries to achieve his ends by intimidating the widowed queen's lady-in-waiting Mistress Shore into claiming that the dead king's two children are illegitimate. She refuses, and Richard tortures her. After she dies on the rack, Richard claims he executed her for spreading the rumour that the princes were illegitimate. He says that the two princes should be placed in his protective custody.

The ghosts of Clarence, King Edward and Mistress Shore haunt Richard, warning him that they will be revenged at "Bosworth". He is also told that he will be killed by a dead man. Shore's ghost merges with the body of Anne, and a semi-deranged Richard strangles his own wife, believing her to be Shore. Without his beloved Anne, he is struck with guilt and loneliness. Richard consults the Moorish physician and sorcerer Tyrus, who shows him visions of his future, including the prophecy that he will be king.

Tyrus is disturbed by Richard's increasingly deranged demeanour. Fearful for the safety of the princes, he informs Sir Justin, a young aristocrat who is looking after the lads. Justin plots with his girlfriend, Lady Margaret Stanley, to rescue the princes. He manages to get the young Duke of York and his mother free, but he is trapped and captured with the child-king Edward. Lady Margaret, who has been sent to get aid from her father Lord Stanley, is also captured and imprisoned.

Richard spares Justin, because he needs him to negotiate with Stanley, who is withholding his support for the Protector. Richard forces the Archbishop to give up the Duke of York, who has sought church sanctuary in Westminster Abbey with his mother. Aided by his crony, Ratcliffe, Richard then murders the two princes in their beds and proclaims himself king.

The ghosts of the princes try to lure Richard to his death from the battlements of the Tower, but he is saved by Buckingham. Buckingham confides in Ratcliffe his doubts about Richard's sanity, suggesting that they should join Lord Stanley. Ratcliffe informs Richard, who has Buckingham tortured to death. Meanwhile, Tyrus helps Justin to rescue Margaret, but is mortally wounded during the escape. Justin and Margaret join Stanley to encourage him to topple Richard from the throne.

Richard is crowned, but is still haunted by fear. Ratcliffe informs him that Stanley has marched to the village of Bosworth with an army. Richard declares that he will fight. When Ratcliffe learns that Stanley has been joined by the Earl of Richmond, he advises Richard to flee, but the king is convinced of his invincibility. At the Battle of Bosworth Field, Richard is eventually left alone on the battlefield after his army has been defeated. The ghosts of his victims appear, and he attempts to fight them. Justin, Stanley and Richmond watch as Richard swipes at thin air. The king attempts to mount a horse, but is thrown and killed by a battleaxe held by a dead soldier.

== Cast ==
- Vincent Price as Richard, Duke of Gloucester
- Michael Pate as Sir Richard Ratcliffe
- Joan Freeman as Lady Margaret Stanley
- Robert Brown as Sir Justin
- Bruce Gordon as the Earl of Buckingham
- Joan Camden as Anne Neville, Duchess of Gloucester
- Richard Hale as Tyrus, the physician
- Sandra Knight as Jane Shore
- Charles Macaulay as George, Duke of Clarence
- Justice Watson as Edward IV
- Sarah Selby as Queen Elizabeth
- Donald Losby as Prince Richard
- Sara Taft as the Duchess of York
- Eugene Mazzola as Edward V

Uncredited

- Morris Ankrum as Archbishop of Canterbury
- Gene Roth as a tailor
- Paul Frees as Opening Narrator (voice)

== Production ==
=== Development ===
In February 1961 it was announced Roger Corman had signed a "multi-picture pact" with Edward Small to make films for United Artists starting with The Intruder.

Corman ended up producing The Intruder without Small but they made Tower of London together. Corman says Small had been impressed by Corman's Edgar Allan Poe adaptations with Vincent Price and approached him with the idea of making a story about Richard III. According to Corman's brother Gene, who co-produced the film, the idea came from him and writer Leo Gordon. They were trying to come up with a fresh take on the Poe picture; they considered Nathaniel Hawthorne "and three or four other ideas" before deciding on William Shakespeare; Macbeth was not ideal but Richard III was. "We were exploring the same genre, but a different author," says Gene Corman.

The film was known as To Dream of Kings. Price's signing was announced in December 1961.

=== Shooting ===
Filming started in March 1962 in Los Angeles. The film was shot in 15 days. Francis Ford Coppola worked on it as dialogue director. Gene Corman says the main cost was the sets, built at the old Producer's Studio in Hollywood (now Raleigh Studios). Gene Corman says the decision to shoot the film in black and white came from Eddie Small due to cost reasons; Small only informed them of this shortly before shooting, leading to a big argument between Roger Corman and Small. Gene Corman says "what Eddie obviously decided was that Vincent Price had a built-in audience and they would not realize up front that they were buying a black and white Price film. They'd take it for granted that this was in color."

Tower of London was meant to be the first of a three-picture contract between Corman and Small. Corman later called the movie:

The most foolish thing I’ve ever filmed. Every night he [Small] would come to see me or call me. The script was changed, reworked without my consent. Lots of strange things were happening all the time, and finally I asked him to tear up our contract. He realized he wouldn’t get anything worthwhile out of me and tore it up. I have nothing against Eddie Small. He's an old man who had lots of success during the thirties, and who doesn't know that times have changed.

== Reception ==
=== Box office ===
Gene Corman says "I kind of liked that film and I know Vincent was always pleased with that performance." He says the movie "opened big—for that kind of film—but the down-the-line play was not what it should have been, because at that point the distributor knew he didn't have a colour film."

=== Critical response ===
Reviews were mixed.

== See also ==
- List of American films of 1962
- Lists of historical films

== Notes ==
- Weaver, Tom (2000). Return of the B Science Fiction and Horror Heroes: The Mutant Melding of Two Volumes of Classic Interviews. McFarland. ISBN 9780786407552.
