= Don Walser =

American country music singer (1934–2006)

Background information
- Also known as: Yodelin' Donnie Walser
- Born: Donald Ray Walser; September 14, 1934; Brownfield, Texas, U.S.
- Origin: Lamesa, Texas, U.S.
- Died: September 20, 2006 (aged 72)
- Genres: Country, Western swing
- Occupations: Singer; songwriter; mechanic; auditor
- Instrument(s): Vocals, guitar
- Years active: 1950–2003
- Labels: Watermelon, Texas Music Group, Valley Entertainment
- Website: donwalser.com

Donald Ray Walser (September 14, 1934 – September 20, 2006) was an American country music singer. He was known for his Texas country and yodeling.

== Music career ==
Walser was born in Brownfield, Texas and raised in Lamesa. A roots musician since he was 11 years old, Walser became an accomplished guitarist, vocalist, and songwriter. He started his first band, The Panhandle Playboys, at age 16, and shared bills with another aspiring Texas singer, Buddy Holly.

As rock'n'roll began to skyrocket in popularity, Walser opted to stay in the Texas Panhandle, raise a family and work as a mechanic and later as an auditor for the National Guard, rather than move to Nashville and pursue a recording career. As a result, he had little following outside Texas for the first part of his career. However, he never stopped playing and became widely known in Texas. From 1959 to 1961 Walser had a group called The Texas Plainsmen and a weekly radio program. For the next three decades he was always in bands and played a heavy schedule. He wrote popular original songs such as "Rolling Stone from Texas", which received a four-star review in 1964 from Billboard magazine.

As time went on, Walser also became known for maintaining a catalog of older, obscure country music and cowboy songs. He kept alive old 1940s and 1950s tunes by country music pioneers such as Bob Wills and Eddy Arnold, and made them his own in a style that blended elements of honky tonk and Western swing. He also was known for his extraordinary yodeling style in the tradition of Slim Whitman and Jimmie Rodgers.

In 1984, the Guard transferred Walser to Austin, a center of the burgeoning alt-country music scene. He put together his Pure Texas Band and developed a strong local following. Walser opened for Johnny Cash in 1996. In 1990, Walser was "discovered" by musician and talent scout TJ McFarland.

In 1994, aged 60, Walser retired from the Guard. Able to devote himself fully to music for the first time in his life, he was immediately signed by Watermelon Records and released the album Rolling Stone From Texas, produced by Ray Benson of Asleep at the Wheel. His extraordinary vocal abilities earned him the nickname "the Pavarotti of the Plains" by a reviewer for Playboy magazine. Because of his Austin base, he attracted fans from country music traditionalists, and alternative music and punk fans. His band later became the opening act for the Butthole Surfers.

He had cameo roles in feature films with Western swing settings, especially an acclaimed and memorable role as the lead singer in a rodeo dance band, singing "I'll Hold You in My Heart," in the 1998 Stephen Frears film The Hi-Lo Country — a performance often regarded as one of the highlights of the picture.

In September 2003, Don Walser retired from live performances due to health issues. Three years later, Walser died due to complications from diabetes on September 20, 2006, six days after his 72nd birthday.

== Discography ==
- Texas Souvenir (1992)
- Rolling Stone From Texas (1994)
- The Archive Series: Volume 1 (1995)
- The Archive Series Volume 2 (1995)
- Texas Top Hand (1996)
- Down At The Sky-Vue Drive-In (1998)
- Here's To Country Music (1999)
- I'll Hold You In My Heart (2000, Valley Entertainment)
- Dare To Dream: The Best of Don Walser (2001)
- Texas Legend (2006)

== Awards and honors ==
Walser was voted "Best Performing Country Band" at the Austin Music Awards, was voted top country band of the year by the Austin Chronicle in 1996, and received an Association for Independent Music "Indie" Award in 1997. He also received recognition in mainstream country, and played the Grand Ole Opry on October 30, 1999, and again in 2001. In 2000, he received a National Heritage Fellowship from the National Endowment for the Arts, and he and the Pure Texas Band played at the Kennedy Center for the Performing Arts for the awards ceremony.

== See also ==
- Music of Austin
