= Sue Ane Langdon =

American actress (born 1936)

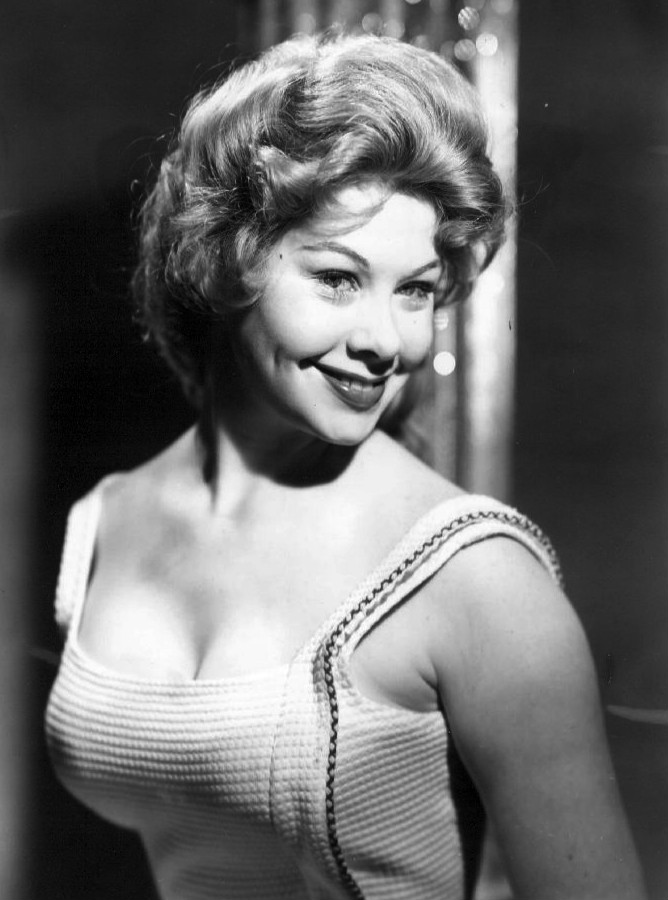
- Langdon in 1958
- Born: Sue Ane Lookhoff; March 8, 1936 (age 90); Paterson, New Jersey, U.S.
- Occupation: Actress
- Years active: 1959–1991
- Spouse: Jack Emrek (m. 1959; died 2010)
- Awards: Golden Globe Award (1971)

Sue Ane Langdon (born Sue Ane Lookhoff on March 8, 1936) is an American actress. She has appeared in dozens of television series and had featured roles in films such as A Guide for the Married Man and The Cheyenne Social Club, both directed by Gene Kelly, as well as The Rounders opposite Henry Fonda and Glenn Ford and two films starring Elvis Presley, Roustabout and Frankie and Johnny.

Langdon began her performing career at Radio City Music Hall, singing and acting in stage productions. In the mid-1960s, she appeared in the Broadway musical The Apple Tree, which starred Alan Alda.

Her co-starring role on the 1970 television series Arnie won her a Golden Globe Award for Best Supporting Actress - Television.

In 1976, she appeared in Hello Dolly at The Little Theatre on the Square. In 1978, she appeared in Chicago for Kenley Players in Columbus, Ohio. She was featured mainly in comedies, with an occasional dramatic film.

== Biography ==
=== Early life ===
Langdon was born in New Jersey, but raised in various locations around the country following the death of her father when she was two years old. She attended the North Texas Teachers College in Denton, Texas, and was also briefly enrolled full-time at Idaho State University.

=== Career ===
Langdon's film debut came in The Great Impostor (1961), starring Tony Curtis. She went on to have leading roles in films such as The Rounders (1965), Hold On! (1966), A Guide for the Married Man (1967), A Man Called Dagger (1967), The Cheyenne Social Club (1970), and A Fine Madness (1966) which led to her posing nude for Playboy magazine. In 1966, United Artists Pictures released Frankie and Johnny in which Langdon co-starred along with Elvis Presley, Donna Douglas, and Harry Morgan. Her later films included The Evictors (1979), Without Warning (1980), Zapped! (1982), UHF (1989), and Zapped Again! (1990).

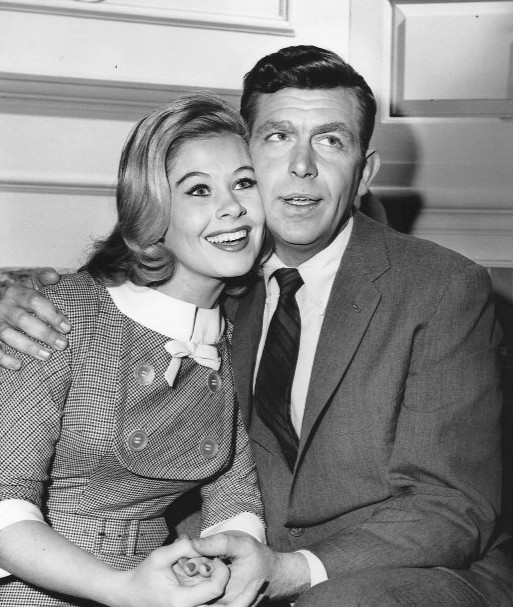
Langdon with Andy Griffith, 1962

Langdon's first regular role on network series television came as the third actress to play Alice Kramden in Jackie Gleason's The Honeymooners sketches and shows. Preceded by Pert Kelton and Audrey Meadows and followed by Sheila MacRae and Meadows again, she shared a Life cover with Gleason promoting his 1962 return to weekly variety television. A premature departure from the role following a brief four-week run left her mark on the American Scene Magazine era of Gleason's career a small one at best. The press reported at the time "incompatible personality differences" between "The Great One" and her. Four years later, MacRae took over the role for the color, hour-long musical versions.

Langdon was more frequently seen on TV in guest roles such as Kitty Marsh during the NBC portion (1959–1961) of Bachelor Father. She appeared twice on Rod Cameron's syndicated crime drama Coronado 9. In 1961, she made her first of three appearances on Perry Mason as Rowena Leach in "The Case of the Crying Comedian". In 1962, she appeared as nurse Mary Simpson in an episode of CBS's The Andy Griffith Show. (Another actress, Julie Adams, also played Nurse Mary on the Griffith show.) In another popular situation comedy, Langdon played a scatter-brained defendant on trial in a Dick Van Dyke Show episode called "One Angry Man".

Langdon made her second guest appearance on Perry Mason in 1964 as the murder victim in "The Case of the Scandalous Sculptor". Her third Perry Mason appearance was in the 1966 episode "The Case of the Avenging Angel" as Dorothy (Dotty) Merrill. Her other guest appearances on TV programs included Gunsmoke, Tales of Wells Fargo, 77 Sunset Strip, Bourbon Street Beat, Room for One More, Shotgun Slade, Mannix, Mike Hammer, Thriller, Bonanza, Ironside, McHale's Navy, The Man from U.N.C.L.E., Banacek, The Wild Wild West, Hart to Hart, Three's Company, The Love Boat, and Happy Days, and as herself on Rowan and Martin's Laugh In.

In 1970, Langdon co-starred in the CBS sitcom Arnie, starring Herschel Bernardi, which aired for two seasons. She portrayed Lillian, the wife of Arnie Nuvo, a loading-dock foreman turned corporate executive. Langdon won a Golden Globe award for her performance. Grandpa Goes to Washington, an NBC hour-long comedy starring veteran actor Jack Albertson, featured Langdon as Rosie Kelley, the daughter-in-law of an over-65 maverick United States senator. Premiering in 1978 opposite Happy Days and Laverne and Shirley, the top-rated block of shows at the time, her third attempt at weekly episodic television lasted for four months. In 1980, a final attempt at her own series came in the ABC comedy When the Whistle Blows. A midseason replacement, Langdon played Darlene Ridgeway, the owner of a saloon frequented by local construction workers. Another rare 60-minute comedy, the program lasted 10 weeks.

== Personal life ==
Langdon married Jack Emrek (16 years her senior) on April 4, 1959, in Las Vegas, Nevada. The couple remained married until his death on April 27, 2010, in Calabasas, California. Emrek was a motion picture, stage, and television director.
