= A-Haunting We Will Go (1942 film) =

1942 film

- Theatrical release poster
- Directed by: Alfred L. Werker
- Written by: Lou Breslow; Stanley Rauh
- Produced by: Sol M. Wurtzel
- Starring: Stan Laurel; Oliver Hardy; Dante the Magician; Sheila Ryan; John Shelton
- Cinematography: Glen MacWilliams
- Edited by: Alfred Day
- Music by: David Buttolph; Cyril J. Mockridge
- Distributed by: 20th Century-Fox
- Release date: August 7, 1942
- Running time: 66:40
- Country: United States
- Language: English

A-Haunting We Will Go is a 1942 Laurel and Hardy feature film released by 20th Century-Fox and directed by Alfred L. Werker. The story is credited to Lou Breslow and Stanley Rauh. The title is a play on the song "A-Hunting We Will Go".

== Plot ==
Stan Laurel and Oliver Hardy are wandering vagabonds in Arizona countryside who are arrested for loitering and spend a night in jail. Upon release, they are instructed to leave town immediately due to lacking transportation. They agree to escort a coffin, containing a corpse, to Dayton, Ohio, believing it offers them free transport.

Unaware that their employers, Frank Lucas and Joe Morgan, are gangsters working for Darby Mason, a wanted criminal, Stan and Oliver load Mason's trunk onto a train, mistaking it for another trunk belonging to a magician named Dante. Along the journey, they fall victim to confidence men and are left penniless until Dante assists them financially.

Upon arrival in Dayton, confusion arises as the trunks are mixed up, leading to mistaken identities. Mason's trunk is sent to the theater where Dante performs, while Dante's trunk is delivered to a sanatorium. As events unfold, confusion ensues at the theater, with mistaken identities and suspicions mounting.

Investigator Steve Barnes, disguised as attorney Kilgore, reveals the inheritance search as a trap to capture Mason. Trapped in the theater's basement with his accomplices, Mason confesses to a murder. Meanwhile, Ollie continues his search for Stan, finding him apparently shrunken by magic.

== Cast ==
- Stan Laurel - Stanley
- Oliver Hardy - Ollie
- Harry August Jansen - Dante The Magician
- Sheila Ryan - Margo
- John Shelton - Tommy White
- Don Costello - Doc Lake
- Elisha Cook Jr. - Frank Lucas
- Edward Gargan - Police Lt. Foster
- Addison Richards - Attorney Malcolm Kilgore
- George Lynn - Darby Mason
- James Bush - Joe Morgan
- Lou Lubin - Dixie Beeler
- Robert Emmett Keane - Parker
- Richard Lane - Phillips
- Mantan Moreland - Waiter
- Wade Boteler - Police Announcer
- Buz Buckley - young admirer
- Barry Downing - young admirer
- Mary Lou Harrington - young admirer
- Terry Moore - young admirer
- Leon Taylor - young admirer
- Roland Carpenter - Dante's stage assistant
- Violet Church - Dante's stage assistant
- Mildred Gaye - Dante's stage assistant
- Les Clark - Dante's stage assistant
- Harry Benjamin Carter - bit role
- Edgar Dearing - officer
- Tom Dugan - motorist
- Ralph Dunn - officer
- Frank Faylen - railroad detective
- Wilbur Mack - railroad passenger
- Mantan Moreland - railroad porter
- Eddy Waller - Wilcox, baggage man
- Bud Geary - electrician
- Paul Kruger - stage hand
- Margaret Roach - showgirl
- Walter Sande - expressman
