= List of The Odd Couple (1970 TV series) episodes =

The Odd Couple is a television situation comedy broadcast from September 24, 1970 to March 7, 1975 on ABC. It starred Jack Klugman as Oscar Madison and Tony Randall as Felix Unger. The following is a list of episodes.

== Series overview ==
All five seasons of this show have been released on DVD by Paramount Home Entertainment/CBS DVD.

Season	Episodes	Originally released		
Season	Episodes	First released	Last released	Network
1	24	September 24, 1970	March 26, 1971	ABC
2	23	September 17, 1971	March 3, 1972	ABC
3	23	September 15, 1972	March 23, 1973	ABC
4	22	September 14, 1973	March 22, 1974	ABC
5	22	September 12, 1974	March 7, 1975	ABC
TV movie		September 24, 1993		CBS

== Episodes ==
=== Season 1 (1970–71) ===
No. overall	No. in season	Title	Directed by	Written by	Original release date
1	1	"The Laundry Orgy"	Jerry Paris	Jerry Belson & Garry Marshall	September 24, 1970
Oscar and Felix have a disastrous date with the English Pigeon Sisters (Monica Evans as Cecily and Carole Shelley as Gwendolyn).
2	2	"The Fight of the Felix"	Bruce Bilson	Peggy Elliott & Ed Scharlach	October 1, 1970
After Oscar gets into a fight with a hockey player (Richard X. Slattery), Felix tries to stand up for him but ends up in the boxing ring instead.
3	3	"Felix Gets Sick"	Hal Cooper	Albert E. Lewin	October 8, 1970
Oscar's weekend with a beautiful stewardess (Bridget Hanley) is ruined when needy Felix comes down with the flu.
4	4	"The Jury Story"	Hal Cooper	Lloyd Turner & Gordon Mitchell	October 15, 1970
Oscar and Felix reminisce how they first met when serving on a jury. Barney Martin guest stars.
5	5	"The Breakup"	Charles R. Rondeau	Ruth B. Flippen	October 22, 1970
After Oscar kicks Felix out, the latter's life becomes nomadic as he wears out his welcome among his small circle of friends. Alice Ghostley guest stars as Murray (Al Molinaro)'s wife.
6	6	"Oscar's Ulcer"	Bruce Bilson	Bob Rodgers	October 29, 1970
Felix plays nursemaid when Oscar recovers from an ulcer.
7	7	"I Do, I Don't"	Bruce Bilson	Carl Kleinschmitt	November 5, 1970
When Felix recalls his marriage and divorce, he causes a bridegroom (George Furth) to get cold feet and call off his wedding. Joyce Van Patten guest stars.
8	8	"Oscar the Model"	George Tyne	Jerry Belson & Garry Marshall	November 12, 1970
An ad exec (Albert Brooks) directs Felix to use Oscar in a big cologne campaign.
9	9	"The Big Brothers"	Bruce Bilson	Dick Bensfield & Perry Grant	November 19, 1970
Felix tries to impress a young boy (Clint Howard) with his knowledge of the arts, but the kid is more interested in Oscar.
10	10	"It's All Over Now, Baby Bird"	Jerry Paris	Dale McRaven	December 3, 1970
Felix and Oscar have a funeral for Felix's beloved parrot.
11	11	"Felix Is Missing"	George Tyne	Albert E. Lewin	December 10, 1970
When Felix goes to Canada for work without leaving word, Oscar is accused of foul play. Albert Brooks again guest starred.
12	12	"Scrooge Gets an Oscar"	George Tyne	Ron Friedman	December 17, 1970
Oscar has a nightmare in which he is Ebenezer Madison (Scrooge) in A Christmas Carol.
13	13	"The Blackout"	Charles R. Rondeau	Bill Idelson & Harvey Miller	December 24, 1970
When $50 goes missing after a power outage during a poker game, Oscar is the prime suspect. Cynthia Lynn guest stars.
14	14	"They Use Horseradish, Don't They?"	Garry Marshall	Jerry Belson & Garry Marshall	January 7, 1971
Paralyzed with fear during a cooking contest, Felix needs Oscar's help.
15	15	"The Hideaway"	Dick Michaels	Harry Winkler & Harry Dolan	January 14, 1971
Felix discovers that Oscar's football-playing discovery (Reni Santoni) is a cellist and urges him to give up sports. Dub Taylor guest stars.
16	16	"Lovers Don't Make House Calls"	Bruce Bilson	Ron Friedman	January 29, 1971
Oscar falls for Dr. Nancy Cunningham (Joan Hotchkis) when she comes to the apartment to tend to Felix.
17	17	"Engrave Trouble"	Alan Rafkin	Peggy Elliott & Ed Scharlach	February 5, 1971
When his ex-wife's watch is stolen, Felix lets Oscar contact his shady friends to get it back. Michael Constantine guest stars.
18	18	"Bunny Is Missing Down by the Lake"	Jerry Paris	Alan Mandel & Charles Shyer	February 12, 1971
Oscar and Felix stay in a cabin, where they take refuge from the rain with a pretty camp counselor (E. J. Peaker) and three girls (Lisa Gerritsen, Pamelyn Ferdin, and Gloria McCartney).
19	19	"You've Come a Long Way, Baby"	Garry Marshall	Albert E. Lewin	February 19, 1971
Felix must take care of a baby left behind at his studio.
20	20	"A Taste of Money"	Alan Rafkin	Lloyd Turner & Gordon Mitchell	February 26, 1971
Felix and Oscar try to determine how their young neighbor (Christopher Shea) acquired $2,000 in cash.
21	21	"Oscar's New Life"	Alan Rafkin	Jack Winter	March 5, 1971
After being fired from the newspaper, Oscar takes a position with Harem, a gentlemen's magazine operated by Beau Buffingham (John Astin). Edward Platt also appears.
22	22	"What Makes Felix Run"	Jerry Paris	Bill Manhoff	March 12, 1971
To cure Felix of his neatness and help him win back his ex-wife, Oscar tries to turn him into a slob.
23	23	"What Does a Naked Lady Say to You?"	Hal Cooper	Peggy Elliott & Ed Scharlach	March 19, 1971
Felix's girlfriend (Marj Dusay) tells him she is a librarian, but she is an actress in a nude play.
24	24	"Trapped"	Jerry Belson	Charles Shyer & Alan Mandel	March 26, 1971
On the way to a costume party, Felix, Oscar and Nancy become locked in the building's basement.

=== Season 2 (1971–72) ===
No. overall	No. in season	Title	Directed by	Written by	Original release date
25	1	"Natural Childbirth"	Hal Cooper	Bill Idelson & Harvey Miller	September 17, 1971
Oscar tries to help his ex-wife's pregnant niece (Hilary Thompson).
26	2	"Felix's Wife's Boyfriend"	Jerry Paris	Ron Friedman	September 24, 1971
With Felix in Canada, Oscar and Nancy fix up his ex-wife up with Nancy's brother (Fred Beir). First appearance of Janis Hansen as Gloria.
27	3	"Hospital Mates"	Jerry Paris	Garry Marshall	October 1, 1971
Hospitalized at the same time, Oscar and Felix must share a room.
28	4	"Sleepwalker"	Jack Donohue	Mickey Rose	October 8, 1971
Oscar's sleepwalking turns dangerous for Felix.
29	5	"A Grave for Felix"	Hal Cooper	Dick Bensfield & Perry Grant	October 15, 1971
Oscar helps Felix find an acceptable burial plot.
30	6	"Murray the Fink"	Jay Sandrich	Perry Grant & Dick Bensfield	October 29, 1971
Murray gets tough with his poker buddies and throws them in jail for gambling.
31	7	"Does Your Mother Know You're Out, Rigoletto?"	Jack Donohue	Ron Friedman	November 5, 1971
After Oscar accidentally injures opera star Richard Fredricks, he must take the singer's place in Felix's opera production.
32	8	"The Fat Farm"	Mel Ferber	Albert E. Lewin	November 12, 1971
Oscar breaks all the rules when he and Felix stay at a weight-loss clinic. In 1997, TV Guide ranked this episode #58 in its "100 Greatest Episodes of All Time" list.
33	9	"The Odd Couple Meet Their Host"	Hal Cooper	Harvey Miller & Bill Idelson	November 19, 1971
After Oscar tells funny stories about Felix on The Tonight Show, Felix demands equal airtime to reply. Guest star: David Steinberg
34	10	"Win One for Felix"	Jack Donohue	Story by : Arthur Julian; Teleplay by : Bill Idelson & Harvey Miller and Arthur Julian	December 3, 1971
Felix tries to coach his son (Willie Aames)'s football team.
35	11	"Being Divorced Is Never Having to Say I Do"	Bruce Bilson	Rick Mittleman	December 10, 1971
Felix's meddling threatens the remarriage of Oscar's ex-wife. First appearance of Klugman's real-life wife Brett Somers as Blanche.
36	12	"Surprise, Surprise!"	Jerry Paris	Jim Fritzell & Everett Greenbaum	December 17, 1971
Felix's plan to hold his daughter (Pamelyn Ferdin)'s birthday party at the apartment clashes with Oscar's big poker game.
37	13	"Felix the Calypso Singer"	Jack Donohue	Dick Bensfield & Perry Grant	December 24, 1971
When Nancy can't make it, Oscar takes Felix on a Caribbean vacation. Vito Scotti guest stars.
38	14	"And Leave the Greyhound to Us?"	Hal Cooper	Martin Cohan	December 31, 1971
Oscar wins a racing dog in a poker game, but Felix would rather treat it like a pet.
39	15	"Security Arms"	George Tyne	Jerry Belson	January 7, 1972
Felix and Oscar move into a maximum-security building that feels more like a prison than an apartment. John Fiedler guest stars.
40	16	"Speak for Yourself"	Hal Cooper	Peggy Elliott & Ed Scharlach	January 14, 1972
Oscar recalls how he had to deliver Felix's proposal to Gloria when Felix lost his voice.
41	17	"You Saved My Life"	Jack Donohue	Bob Rodgers	January 21, 1972
After Oscar saves Felix's life, Felix goes overboard to repay the debt. First appearance of Penny Marshall as Myrna Turner, Oscar's secretary.
42	18	"Where's Grandpa?"	Jack Donohue	Albert E. Lewin	January 28, 1972
Felix's annoying grandfather (Tony Randall in a dual role) comes to stay with Oscar while Felix is out of town.
43	19	"Partner's Investment"	George Tyne and Bob Birnbaum	Bill Idelson & Harvey Miller	February 4, 1972
Felix invests Oscar's gambling money in a Japanese restaurant but soon drives the staff away. Pat Morita guest stars.
44	20	"Good, Bad Boy"	Hal Cooper	Dick Bensfield & Perry Grant	February 11, 1972
Felix must deal with a reform school boy (James Van Patten) who asks his daughter to a dance.
45	21	"A Night to Dismember"	George Marshall	Rick Mittleman	February 18, 1972
Oscar, Blanche and Felix all remember the New Year's Eve when the Madisons split up differently. Arch Johnson and Joan Van Ark guest star.
46	22	"Oscar's Promotion"	Jack Donohue	Martin Cohan	February 25, 1972
Felix persuades a champion Chinese wrestler (Jack Soo) to give up the sport, causing turmoil with Oscar.
47	23	"Psychic, Shmychic"	Mel Ferber	Ron Friedman	March 3, 1972
Felix's uncanny predictions lead him to foresee Oscar being murdered at a banquet. Bernie Kopell guest stars.

=== Season 3 (1972–73) ===
No. overall	No. in season	Title	Directed by	Written by	Original release date
48	1	"Gloria, Halleluljah"	Garry Marshall	Rick Mittleman	September 15, 1972
A computer dating service matches Oscar with Felix's ex-wife. First appearance of Elinor Donahue as Miriam Welby.
49	2	"Big Mouth"	Jerry Paris	Ben Joelson & Art Baer	September 22, 1972
Oscar's feud with Howard Cosell causes him to leave Felix's photo shoot.
50	3	"The Princess"	Jerry Paris	Bill Idelson	September 29, 1972
Oscar falls for a European princess (Jean Simmons).
51	4	"The Pen Is Mightier Than the Pencil"	Bob Birnbaum	Jack Winter	October 6, 1972
Felix takes a creative writing class with surprising results. Wally Cox guest stars.
52	5	"The Odd Monks"	Jerry Belson	Garry Marshall	October 13, 1972
Felix and Oscar try living as silent monks in a monastery. Richard Stahl guest stars.
53	6	"I'm Dying of Unger"	Mel Ferber	Joe Glauberg	October 20, 1972
Oscar retreats to an isolated cabin to solve his writer's block.
54	7	"The Odd Couples"	Hal Cooper	Harvey Miller	October 27, 1972
For his mother (Jane Dulo)'s sake, Oscar and Blanche pretend they are still married.
55	8	"Felix's First Commercial"	Jerry Paris	Albert E. Lewin	November 3, 1972
Felix directs a shaving-cream commercial starring pro football star Deacon Jones.
56	9	"The First Baby"	Alex March	Bob Brunner and Garry Marshall	November 10, 1972
Oscar tells the story of how Felix gets thrown out of the hospital while Gloria is giving birth to their daughter.
57	10	"Oscar's Birthday"	George Marshall	Story by : Bob Brunner; Teleplay by : Albert E. Lewin	November 17, 1972
Felix plans a This Is Your Life surprise birthday party for Oscar.
58	11	"Password"	Alex March	Frank Buxton	December 1, 1972
Oscar appears as a celebrity contestant on Password, with Felix as his partner. Guest stars: Allen Ludden and Betty White (as themselves). In 1997, TV Guide ranked this episode #5 in its "100 Greatest Episodes of All Time" list. In 2009, it was ranked at #58.
59	12	"The Odd Father"	Jack Donohue	Michael Leeson and Steve Zacharias	December 8, 1972
Felix is afraid that he's losing contact with his daughter (Doney Oatman) and resolves to become a better father. Guest star: Frank Delfino.
60	13	"Don't Believe in Roomers"	Jack Donohue	Peggy Elliott & Ed Scharlach	December 22, 1972
Oscar and Felix compete for the affections of a vagabond young woman (Marlyn Mason).
61	14	"Sometimes a Great Ocean"	Hal Cooper	Dennis Klein	January 5, 1973
To help him recover from an ulcer, Felix takes Oscar on a cruise that turns out to be an excursion for senior citizens. Queenie Smith and Karl Swenson appear.
62	15	"I Gotta Be Me"	Mel Ferber	David W. Duclon and Joe Glauberg	January 12, 1973
Felix and Oscar turn to group therapy to resolve their mutual hostility.
63	16	"The Ides of April"	Bob Birnbaum	Mark Rothman & Lowell Ganz	January 19, 1973
Summoned to the IRS to sign his tax return, Felix convinces them to audit Oscar.
64	17	"Myrna's Debut"	Jerry Paris	Perry Grant & Dick Bensfield	February 2, 1973
Felix tries to turn Myrna into a professional dancer. Bob Hastings guest stars.
65	18	"The Hustler"	Jerry Paris	Mark Rothman & Lowell Ganz	February 9, 1973
Felix's opera club holds a casino night to raise money for new costumes. Guest star: Stanley Adams.
66	19	"My Strife in Court"	Jerry Paris	Mark Rothman & Lowell Ganz	February 16, 1973
Oscar and Felix get arrested for scalping theater tickets. Curt Conway guest stars.
67	20	"Let's Make a Deal"	Frank Buxton	David W. Duclon and Joe Glauberg	February 23, 1973
Oscar and Felix appear on Let's Make a Deal as two halves of a horse. Guest star: Monty Hall.
68	21	"The Odyssey Couple"	Jerry Paris	Bob Brunner and Dennis Klein	March 2, 1973
Felix introduces Oscar to a barefooted Greek belly dancer (Lynne Miller). Elvia Allman guest stars as Oscar's mother.
69	22	"Take My Furniture, Please"	Jack Winter	Harvey Miller	March 9, 1973
Felix updates the apartment in modern decor, but Oscar hates the changes. Charles Lane and Bubba Smith guest star.
70	23	"The Murray Who Came to Dinner"	Jerry Paris	Ron Friedman	March 23, 1973
At odds with his wife (Jane Dulo), Murray takes refuge with Felix and Oscar.

=== Season 4 (1973–74) ===
No. overall	No. in season	Title	Directed by	Written by	Original release date
71	1	"Gloria Moves In"	Garry Marshall	Mark Rothman & Lowell Ganz	September 14, 1973
Felix's invitation for Gloria to stay for the weekend threatens Oscar's big poker game plans.
72	2	"Last Tango in Newark"	Jay Sandrich	Ron Friedman	September 21, 1973
When famous ballet star Edward Villella is late for a children's performance of "Swan Lake", Felix takes it upon himself to dance the lead role himself.
73	3	"The Odd Decathlon"	Jay Sandrich	Jack Winter	September 28, 1973
Felix challenges Oscar to a mini-decathlon to prove his physical superiority.
74	4	"That Was No Lady"	Jerry Belson	Lee Kalcheim	October 5, 1973
Felix's new girlfriend Melanie Metcalf (Patricia Harty) doesn't tell him that she is married to National Football League star Jake Metcalf (Alex Karras).
75	5	"The Odd Holiday"	Mel Ferber	Phil Mishkin	October 12, 1973
In a flashback to when the Ungers and the Madisons were still married, the two couples travel to the Caribbean and argue, with Gloria asking Felix for a divorce.
76	6	"The New Car"	Garry Marshall	Story by : Michael Elias; Teleplay by : Mark Rothman & Lowell Ganz	October 19, 1973
With Felix's help, Oscar wins a new car in a radio contest, but the two disagree about what to do with it. Dick Clark and John Byner are guest stars.
77	7	"This Is the Army Mrs. Madison"	Mel Ferber	Bob Brunner and Garry Marshall	October 26, 1973
In a flashback, Army Reserves enlistee Oscar weds Blanche at his military base. Liam Dunn guest stars.
78	8	"The Songwriter"	Mel Ferber	Buz Kohan & Bill Angelos	November 2, 1973
While Oscar is dating singer Jaye P. Morgan, Felix tries to sell her his tune "Happy and Peppy and Bursting with Love". Wolfman Jack guest stars.
79	9	"Felix Directs"	Jerry Paris	Harvey Miller	November 9, 1973
Felix's documentary film about Oscar lands him a directing job that is way over his head. David White guest stars.
80	10	"The Pig Who Came to Dinner"	Jack Donohue	Mickey Rose	November 16, 1973
Oscar challenges friend and tennis star Bobby Riggs to a winner-take-all ping-pong game. Billie Jean King makes a guest appearance as herself at the end of the episode.
81	11	"Maid for Each Other"	Norm Gray	Marlene Barr	November 23, 1973
With Oscar recuperating from an ulcer, Felix hires a maid (Reta Shaw) to take care of him.
82	12	"The Exorcists"	Jack Donohue	Frank Buxton and Michael Leeson	December 7, 1973
Felix hears noises and believes the apartment is haunted, so he conducts a séance to exorcise the spirit. Victor Buono guest stars.
83	13	"A Barnacle Adventure"	Bob Birnbaum	Mark Rothman & Lowell Ganz	December 21, 1973
Oscar and Felix try to pitch a dentist (Val Avery)'s glue invention to a group of investors.
84	14	"The Moonlighter"	Frank Buxton	Phil Mishkin and Mickey Rose	January 4, 1974
Oscar moonlights as a short-order cook in a sketchy diner to pay off a debt to Felix.
85	15	"Cleanliness Is Next to Impossible"	Frank Buxton	Mark Rothman & Lowell Ganz	January 11, 1974
When Oscar's habitual sloppiness threatens his new romantic relationship, Felix tries hypnosis to cure him. Allan Arbus and Janice Lynde guest star. Jack Klugman's son, Adam, appears as a young Oscar.
86	16	"The Flying Felix"	Jack Donohue	Mark Rothman & Lowell Ganz	January 18, 1974
Felix must travel to Houston to shoot an ad, but he's afraid of flying, so Oscar lends a hand. Guest stars: Teri Garr, Maggie Peterson, George Furth, and Grady Sutton.
87	17	"Vocal Girl Makes Good"	Dan Dailey	Buz Kohan & Bill Angelos	January 25, 1974
Felix stumbles upon a perfect choice for Carmen for his opera club's upcoming production, but the ultra-shy woman (Marilyn Horne) can only feel comfortable singing when in the presence of her unrequited love, Oscar.
88	18	"Shuffling Off to Buffalo"	Frank Buxton	Mark Rothman & Lowell Ganz	February 8, 1974
Felix accepts his brother (William Redfield)'s offer of an executive position at the Unger bubble gum factory in Buffalo.
89	19	"A Different Drummer"	Mel Ferber	Frank Buxton and Michael Leeson	February 22, 1974
Felix and his band want to be on Monty Hall's new variety show, but a bitter Oscar stands in the way, still mad about the disastrous Let's Make a Deal segment (episode 67).
90	20	"The Insomniacs"	Jack Donohue	Mickey Rose	March 1, 1974
Oscar, Murray and Myrna try to cure Felix's insomnia.
91	21	"New York's Oddest"	Harvey Miller	Ben Joelson & Art Baer	March 8, 1974
Felix and Oscar sign up for security patrol duty, but Felix goes overboard and soon has the entire building hating him. Michael Lerner guest stars.
92	22	"One for the Bunny"	Jerry Paris	John Rappaport	March 22, 1974
In a flashback episode, Felix remembers shooting for Playboy magazine when then-fiancee Gloria showed up as a model. Hugh Hefner makes a cameo appearance.

=== Season 5 (1974–75) ===
No. overall	No. in season	Title	Directed by	Written by	Original release date
93	1	"The Rain in Spain Falls Mainly in Vain"	Harvey Miller	Rick Mittleman	September 12, 1974
To help Myrna win her boyfriend (Rob Reiner) back, Felix tries to make her into a new woman. Guest stars: Garo Yepremian, Garry Marshall, and Ronny Hallin.
94	2	"To Bowl or Not to Bowl"	Jay Sandrich	Mickey Rose	September 19, 1974
Expert bowler Felix makes excuses to avoid a big game. Leonard Barr guest stars.
95	3	"The Frog"	Mel Ferber	Perry Grant & Dick Bensfield	September 26, 1974
Felix and Oscar search for Felix's son (Leif Garrett)'s escaped frog.
96	4	"The Hollywood Story"	Mel Ferber	Al Gordon & Hal Goldman	October 3, 1974
After landing a bit part in a movie, Oscar brings star-struck Felix to Hollywood. Guest stars: Bob Hope, George Montgomery, Allan Arbus and Leonard Barr.
97	5	"The Dog Story"	Frank Buxton	Ben Joelson & Art Baer	October 10, 1974
Felix steals a mistreated dog and is brought to trial. Guest stars: John Fiedler, Rona Barrett, and Bill Idelson.
98	6	"Strike Up the Band or Else"	Jay Sandrich	Rick Mittleman	October 17, 1974
To settle a debt, Oscar recruits Felix's band to play for a square dance. Guest star: Pernell Roberts.
99	7	"The Odd Candidate"	Garry Marshall	Mark Rothman & Lowell Ganz	October 24, 1974
Oscar runs for city council to save local playgrounds. Howard K. Smith guest stars.
100	8	"The Subway Story"	Norm Gray	Mark Rothman & Lowell Ganz	October 31, 1974
Trapped in a disabled subway car, Felix and Oscar learn that New Yorkers do have a heart. Scatman Crothers guest stars. Garry Marshall, Billy Sands and Barney Martin are other passengers in the subway car.
101	9	"The Paul Williams Show"	Harvey Miller	Rick Mittleman	November 7, 1974
When Felix prevents his daughter from camping out overnight for Paul Williams tickets, she runs away from home to follow Williams.
102	10	"Our Fathers"	Harvey Miller	Martin Donovan	November 21, 1974
In a flashback to Chicago in the Roaring Twenties, Oscar's and Felix's fathers (Klugman and Randall in dual roles) meet, as do the young Oscar (Adam Klugman) and Felix (Sean Manning). Elisha Cook, Jr. and Giorgio Tozzi guest star.
103	11	"The Big Broadcast"	Frank Buxton	Frank Buxton	November 28, 1974
Oscar gets a chance to host his own radio sports talk show. Tina Andrews guest stars.
104	12	"Oscar in Love"	Mel Ferber	Carl Gottlieb	December 12, 1974
Oscar becomes involved with a widow (Dina Merrill) with two children (Kirby Furlong and Shelly Hines).
105	13	"The Bigger They Are"	Harvey Miller	David W. Duclon	December 14, 1974
Felix's award for an ad campaign may have been won dishonestly. Guest stars: John Byner and Maggie Peterson.
106	14	"Two on the Aisle"	Jay Sandrich	Mark Rothman & Lowell Ganz	December 19, 1974
Filling in for the paper's theater critic, Oscar schemes to get information for the column from Felix. Guest stars: John Barbour and real-life theater critics John Simon, Joan Crosby, and Dan Sullivan. Neil Simon, who wrote the stage play of The Odd Couple, makes an uncredited cameo appearance.
107	15	"Your Mother Wears Army Boots"	Frank Buxton	John Rappaport	January 16, 1975
Oscar hires a joke writer (Jack Carter) to help him put down Howard Cosell. Guest stars: Roone Arledge and Martina Arroyo.
108	16	"Felix the Horse Player"	Jerry Paris	Jack Winter	January 23, 1975
After Oscar scores big at the race track, Felix becomes interested in betting on horses. Guest stars: Jerry Maren and Fritz Feld.
109	17	"The Rent Strike"	Norm Gray	Martin A. Ragaway	January 31, 1975
Felix organizes a rent strike against the building's nasty manager (Victor Buono). Guest star: Rodney Allen Rippy.
110	18	"Two Men on a Hoarse"	Charles Shyer	Martin Donovan	February 7, 1975
Following surgery, Oscar has to endure two days without yelling at Felix. Guest stars: Dick Cavett and Phil Foster.
111	19	"The Roy Clark Show"	Frank Buxton	Bob Howard and David W. Duclon	February 14, 1975
Oscar's old army buddy (Roy Clark) is a practical joker and country musician. Albert Paulsen guest stars.
112	20	"Old Flames Never Die"	Frank Buxton	Buz Kohan & Bill Angelos	February 21, 1975
Felix convinces himself that he's an old man.
113	21	"Laugh, Clown, Laugh"	Norm Gray	Frank Buxton	February 28, 1975
Oscar is chosen as co-host of Richard Dawson's new variety show.
114	22	"Felix Remarries"	Jack Donohue	Larry Rhine & Sidney Reznick	March 7, 1975
Felix convinces Gloria to remarry him.

=== TV movie (1993) ===
Title	Directed by	Written by	Original release date
The Odd Couple Together Again	Robert Klane	Robert Klane	September 24, 1993
While Oscar recovers from throat surgery, Felix and Oscar are temporarily roommates again while Felix's daughter prepares for her wedding.
