= In Praise of Pip =

- The Twilight Zone episode
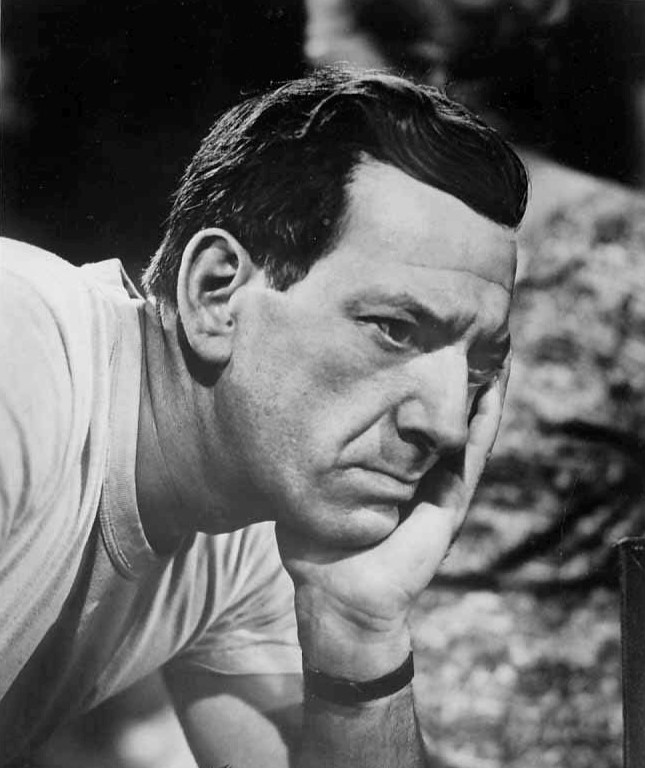
- Jack Klugman as Max Phillips
- Episode no.: Season 5 Episode 1
- Directed by: Joseph M. Newman
- Written by: Rod Serling
- Production code: 2607
- Original air date: September 27, 1963

Guest appearances
- Jack Klugman: Max Phillips; Connie Gilchrist: Mrs. Feeny; Robert Diamond: Pvt. Pip; Billy Mumy: Young Pip

Episode chronology
← Previous "The Bard"	Next → "Steel"
- The Twilight Zone (1959 TV series) (season 5)

"In Praise of Pip" is an episode of the American television anthology series The Twilight Zone. In this episode, after learning that his soldier son has suffered a mortal wound in an early phase of the Vietnam War, a crooked bookie encounters a childhood version of his son.

This was the first episode of The Twilight Zone to be 25 minutes long since "The Changing of the Guard".

== Opening narration ==
Submitted for your approval: one Max Phillips. A slightly-the-worse-for-wear maker of book, whose life has been as drab and undistinguished as a bundle of dirty clothes. And though it's very late in his day, he has an errant wish that the rest of his life might be sent out to a laundry, to come back shiny and clean. This to be a gift of love to a son named Pip. Mr. Max Phillips, Homo sapiens, who is soon to discover that man is not as wise as he thinks. Said lesson to be learned in the Twilight Zone.

== Plot ==
In Vietnam, medics are examining Pip Phillips, a wounded soldier. The medical officer says Pip's case is hopeless and it is only a matter of time before he will die. In the United States, Pip's father Max, a bookie, suckers a young man named George Reynold into placing $300 on a bad bet. Reynold comes to him for help, saying that he made the bet on borrowed money and will go to jail if he doesn't get it back. Max returns the $300, but his boss Mr. Moran notices the discrepancy in the books and summons both Max and Reynold to his office. As the young man is strong-armed into returning his bet, Max receives a telegram about Pip's condition. Max vocally rues the time he spent working as a bookie instead of being a father to his son, and returns the money to Reynold. He tells him to run and threatens Moran and his underling with a knife. The underling shoots Max but Max is still enraged by his son's fate and uses his knife to kill both men.

Wounded, he stumbles outside towards a closed amusement park and is surprised to see Pip at age 10. The two have some fun and redress Max's near-constant absence from his son's life, with Max teaching Pip how to shoot at a shooting gallery. Pip runs off into the house of mirrors, and Max follows. When Max finds him, Pip explains that he is dying and vanishes. Max prays to God and offers to trade his own life in exchange for Pip's. He collapses and dies on the midway.

Some months later, the adult Pip is seen at the park, now walking with the aid of a cane. Max's former landlady Mrs. Feeny is also there with her granddaughter and recalls Max's love for his son. Pip visits the shooting gallery, remembering the wonderful times he had as a child with his father and his father's advice to work the gun and not the jaw. He proclaims that his father was "[his] best buddy" as he begins to play the shooting game.

== Closing narration ==
Very little comment here, save for this small aside: that the ties of flesh are deep and strong; that the capacity to love is a vital, rich, and all-consuming function of the human animal. And that you can find nobility and sacrifice and love wherever you may seek it out: down the block, in the heart or - in the Twilight Zone.

== Cast ==
- Jack Klugman as Max Phillips
- Connie Gilchrist as Mrs. Feeny
- Robert Diamond as Pvt. Pip
- Billy Mumy: Young Pip

Uncredited (in order of appearance)

- Ross Elliott: doctor in Vietnam
- Gerald Gordon: lieutenant in Vietnam
- Russell Horton: George Reynold
- S. John Launer: Mr. Moran
- Kreg Martin: Mr. Moran's enforcer
- Stuart Nisbet: surgeon in Vietnam

Jack Klugman appeared in four episodes of the original series. In addition to this episode, he starred in "Death Ship", broadcast seven months earlier, in February; "A Game of Pool" (October 1961); and "A Passage for Trumpet" (May 1960). In addition to this episode, Billy Mumy appeared in two other episodes of the original series: 1961's "It's a Good Life" (November) and "Long Distance Call" (March). He also appeared (credited as Bill Mumy) in the "It's a Good Life" segment of Twilight Zone: The Movie (1983), and the second Twilight Zone revival episode "It's Still a Good Life" in 2003.

Among the six uncredited cast members with speaking roles, three appeared in other episodes. Ross Elliott did receive billing in the earlier Jack Klugman episode "Death Ship" although, same as in this episode, he had no scenes with Klugman. Russell Horton was also credited in third season's "The Changing of the Guard" (June 1962), playing one of the students. S. John Launer was in three season one episodes, receiving credit in "The Purple Testament" (February 1960), but remaining uncredited in "Third from the Sun" (January 1960), in which only his voice was heard. His earliest episode, in which he likewise received no credit, was "And When the Sky Was Opened" (December 1959).

== Episode notes ==
The script is essentially a reworked version of the A-plot of “Next of Kin”, a one-hour script Serling wrote for Kraft Television Theatre and which aired on 8 April 1953. "In Praise of Pip" removes two other intertwined stories that were part of "Next of Kin", but the first two acts are otherwise almost identical down to the character names, the only change being that Max's son is named Tommy in "Next of Kin", not Pip. (And the war, of course, is in Korea, not Vietnam.) Act III, with Max encountering young Pip in the amusement park, is unique to this telling of the story.

"In Praise of Pip" opens in Vietnam, with a wounded Pip being brought into a front-line mobile hospital. Rod Serling originally wanted the episode's opening to take place in Laos; it was CBS who asked for the change to Vietnam. As a result of the prominent use of Vietnam in the episode, "In Praise of Pip" is often incorrectly cited as the first American television drama to mention the growing Vietnam War, or the first to show a Vietnam veteran—both assertions, however, are false. Starting in March 1963, actor Glenn Corbett had become a regular on the CBS series Route 66, playing returned Vietnam soldier Lincoln Case. The Vietnam War and its effects on Linc were crucial plot points in several Route 66 episodes, including his debut, which was broadcast six months before this episode.

The episode was filmed on location at the Pacific Ocean Park in Santa Monica, California.

This was the first episode sponsored by American Tobacco (on alternate weeks), on behalf of Pall Mall cigarettes, who suggested that Serling and some of the guest stars and supporting players "light up" during the episodes. Unlike previous sponsor Liggett & Myers, American Tobacco did not have Serling plug their products at the end of the program.
