= The Fugitive season 1 =

The Fugitive
- Season 1
- No. of episodes: 30

Release
- Original network: ABC
- Original release: September 17, 1963 – April 21, 1964

Season chronology
- Next → Season 2

The first season of The Fugitive premiered on September 17, 1963. It aired Tuesdays at 10:00-11:00 pm on ABC from September 17, 1963 to April 21, 1964. The season was released through two volumes on Region 1 DVDs, with the first volume (containing the first 15 episodes) being released on August 14, 2007 and Volume 2 being released on February 26, 2008.

== Episodes ==
No. overall	No. in season	Title	Directed by	Written by	Kimble's Alias and Location	Original release date	Prod. code
1	1	"Fear in a Desert City"	Walter Grauman	Stanford Whitmore	James Lincoln Tucson, Arizona	September 17, 1963	4600
After being on the run for six months, Richard Kimble finds himself in Tucson, Arizona under the name of James Lincoln. He has checked himself into a hotel and has found a job as a bartender at the Branding Iron. There he meets Monica Welles, the piano player with a young son who has escaped her physically abusive, estranged husband Ed Wells. After Kimble falls for her, Ed wants him out of town or dead. Guest Stars: Vera Miles as Monica Welles, Brian Keith as Ed Welles, Donald Losby as Mark Welles, Harry Townes as Sgt. Burden, Dabbs Greer as Detective Fairfield, and Paul Birch as Captain Carpenter. • Barry Morse appears in this episode. The episode was filmed on location in Tucson as well as in Hollywood in the period of November 27 to December 11, 1962.
2	2	"The Witch"	Andrew McCullough	William D. Gordon	Jim Fowler Hainesville, Missouri	September 24, 1963	4604
In rural Missouri, Jenny Ammory (guest star Gina Gillespie) is a young girl who lies compulsively. She neglects to do her homework and when sent to school against her wishes, she meets Richard Kimble, who is working as a delivery driver under the alias Jim Fowler, when she leaves her books by a dirt pathway to consult a rag doll she has named Naiad she keeps near a mill pond. Kimble gives her back her books and she politely thanks him, with them both go on their ways. When she arrives at her school, however, she tells her teacher, Emily Norton (guest star Patricia Crowley), that Kimble attacked her as an excuse for why she was late. Emily, however, has caught Jenny in lies before, and when Kimble delivers some items to the school she talks to him, noting how she is persecuted by the wives of the fathers of her students because of her beauty that has attracted these men to her. When Jenny catches them talking, she is scolded by Emily, but runs home and tells her mother that Kimble and Emily Norton were kissing in the barn. Kimble gets roughed up by his co-workers and is advised to leave town by the sheriff. Kimble goes to a school hearing on Emily's behalf and tries to clear her by catching Jenny in a lie. His plan backfires when Jenny accuses him of chasing her into the woods. Kimble escapes through a window, and the villagers at the meeting decide to form an armed posse to track Kimble down. Jenny flees after her father finds she has been lying all along, and Jenny stands between Kimble and the armed mob at the mill pond.
3	3	"The Other Side of the Mountain"	James Sheldon	Story by : Alan Caillou; Teleplay by : Alan Caillou and Harry Kronman	N/A West Virginia	October 1, 1963	4605
In West Virginia, Kimble arrives at a local coal mining town where he is roughed up by the redneck locals and then chased by a sheriff's posse. Hiding in the mountains, Kimble meets Cassie, a young woman living in a remote cabin with her grandmother. Cassie tells Kimble she will get him to safety because she knows the area, but what she is really wanting is to keep him around for her own selfish reasons. Meanwhile, Gerard flies to West Virginia after learning from the sheriff that Kimble has been spotted in the area and teams up with the posse to try to find him. Guest Stars: Sandy Dennis as Cassie, Bruce Dern as Deputy Martin, Frank Sutton as Del Jackson, Ruth White as Grams, R.G. Armstrong as Sheriff Bradley, and Paul Birch as Captain Carpenter. • Barry Morse appears in this episode.
4	4	"Never Wave Goodbye"	William A. Graham	Hank Searls	Jeff Cooper Santa Barbara, California	October 8, 1963	4606
5	5	"Never Wave Goodbye"	William A. Graham	Hank Searls	Jeff Cooper Santa Barbara, California	October 15, 1963	4607
Kimble, working as an apprentice sail maker in Santa Barbara, California, falls in love with Karen, the niece of his stern, but compassionate boss, Lars Christian. However, he earns scorn from Karen's jealous and overprotective brother, Eric. When Lars suffers a heart attack, his last wish on his deathbed is to implore Kimble to stay with Karen. Meanwhile, Gerard flies to nearby Los Angeles when he hears about the arrest of a one-armed man accused of armed robbery and lets the story hit the newspapers, hoping it will flush out Kimble. After finding that the one-armed man is not the same man he saw fleeing his house the night of Helen's murder, Kimble flees from Los Angeles, barely escaping Gerard's dragnet. Tired of running, Kimble hopes to lie low in Santa Barbara and finally confides in Karen of who he really is. Gerard is able to track down Kimble to Santa Barbara from a single clue that Kimble left behind at the L.A. County Jail, which is a match with the word "sails" printed on it. When Kimble discovers that Gerard has arrived in town looking for him, Kimble and Karen flee by sailboat and hope to end his running by faking his and Karen's death in a sailboat accident during a storm at sea. Gerard, who is on board a Coast Guard cutter, takes a small raft and goes in search for the elusive doctor. He ends up crashing his craft into some shoreline rocks and is injured. Instead of fleeing, Kimble saves Gerard's life. In a show of gratitude Gerard agrees not to arrest Karen. Kimble then says a final good-bye to Karen and flees. • Barry Morse appears in this two-part episode. Guest Stars: Susan Oliver as Karen, Robert Duvall as Eric, Will Kuluva as Lars Christian (Part 1), and Paul Birch as Captain Carpenter (Part 1). The two-part episode was filmed on location in Santa Barbara.
6	6	"Decision in the Ring"	Robert Ellis Miller	Arthur Weiss	Ray Miller Los Angeles, California	October 22, 1963	4601
Kimble finds work as a cut man for boxer, Joe Smith. Joe confides in Kimble that he wanted to be a doctor, but he chose boxing because he felt that being a black man would be an obstacle in the world of medicine. When Kimble discovers that Joe is suffering from memory loss, both Kimble and Joe's wife, Laura, fear that Joe might have brain damage from his boxing and that if he continues to box, it will kill him. Meanwhile, a police detective named Henry Stone goes undercover as a sports writer to investigate Joe's manager, Lou, for possible mob ties. When a disgruntled boxing worker tips off Stone that he suspects that someone might be wanting Joe to throw his next fight, the detective investigates Kimble. Guest Stars: James Edwards as Joe Smith, Hari Rhodes as Dan Digby, Ruby Dee as Laura Smith, James Dunn as Lou Bragan, Robert F. Simon as Murphy, Harry Swoger as Wally Wilson, and Richard Kemmer as Henry Stone.
7	7	"Smoke Screen"	Claudio Guzman	John D. F. Black	Joseph Walker The Imperial Valley, California	October 29, 1963	4603
Kimble, who is now working as a farm laborer, and a group of farm workers are surrounded in the hills by a huge brush fire and he must reveal that he is a doctor in order to deliver a pregnant, illegal immigrant's baby. When the news of Kimble's charitable act is reported to the press, Gerard gets wind of it and believes that Kimble is the unnamed doctor. • Barry Morse appears in this episode.
8	8	"See Hollywood and Die"	Andrew McCullough	George Eckstein	Al Fleming Sierra Point, New Mexico/ Flagstaff, Arizona/ Hollywood, California	November 5, 1963	4608
While working as a gas station attendant in New Mexico, Kimble is taken hostage along with a customer, Joanne Spencer (guest star Brenda Vaccaro), by two holdup men, Miles (Chris Robinson) and Vinnie (Lou Antonio). Once on the road, Kimble pretends that he is a criminal and is heading towards Los Angeles for a "big job". At the same time, he lets Joanne know that he's on her side, but she's suspicious to his true motives. Upon arriving in Los Angeles, Kimble decides to set up Miles and Vinnie to be arrested, but Miles, not trusting Kimble enough, wants him to kill Joanne to prove himself.
9	9	"Ticket to Alaska"	Jerry Hopper	Oliver Crawford	Larry Talman Off the coast of British Columbia	November 12, 1963	4610
Kimble is traveling to Alaska on a small freighter when an FBI agent named Paul Vale (guest star Gene Lyons) arrives and begins questioning him and all the passengers in a search for a Korean War criminal and traitor. Vale becomes most suspicious of Kimble, as well as another passenger, George Banning (guest star David White), and his wife Adrienne (guest star Geraldine Brooks), who are embezzlers fleeing the States. When Vale is found murdered the next day, Captain Carraway (guest star John Larkin) interrogates all the suspects. When the captain discovers that some of Kimble's references are fake, Kimble becomes the chief suspect in the murder.
10	10	"Fatso"	Ida Lupino	Robert Pirosh	Bill Carter Ellsmore, Kentucky	November 19, 1963	4611
Kimble is thrown in jail in a rural Kentucky town after a minor traffic accident by a sheriff who hates outsiders and his fingerprints are put out over the wire. Before Gerard arrives, Kimble breaks out of the jail with his cellmate, a friendly, overweight young man named Davey "Fatso" Lambert. Hiding out at the Lambert ranch, Kimble sees that Davey's father and brother, Frank, treat the slow-witted Davey badly and blame him for a barn fire years earlier. Kimble tries to prove Davey's innocence as Gerard flies out to Kentucky after learning of Kimble's arrest. Guest Stars: Jack Weston as Davey Lambert, Burt Brinckerhoff as Frank Lambert, Glenda Farrell as Maggie Lambert, Vaughn Taylor as Sheriff Crowley, Henry Beckman as Brown, Paul Langton as Sheriff, Garry Walberg as the Mechanic, King Calder as David Lambert, and Paul Birch as Captain Carpenter. • Barry Morse appears in this episode.
11	11	"Nightmare at Northoak"	Christian Nyby	Stuart Jerome	George Porter Northoak, New Hampshire	November 26, 1963	4612
Kimble has a recurring nightmare that he is on a city street, is spotted by Gerard, and then runs, only to find himself cornered in an alley where Gerard shoots him dead. He awakens from the latest encounter with this nightmare when a school bus crashes and erupts in flames outside of a small New England town of Northoak. Kimble rescues children and the injured driver before an explosion knocks him unconscious. Al Springer, the local sheriff, and his wife Wilma, help the stranger recover, but when their son innocently photographs the injured Kimble for the local paper, the picture makes national news, and brings Gerard to Northoak. Sheriff Springer must thus arrest Kimble, but Gerard cannot take him back to Stafford until extradition papers are prepared, and in the process the townspeople go to the jail to say goodbye to Kimble, giving him an unexpected opportunity to escape. Guest Stars: Nancy Wickwire as Wilma Springer, Frank Overton as Al Springer, Paul Carr as Deputy Ernie, Scott Lane as Larry Springer, Paul Birch as Captain Carpenter, Harry Hickox as Charley, Doreen Lang as Anna, Ian Wolfe as Dr. Babcock, Bobs Watson as Milt Plummer, Charles Herbert as Cal, Bill McLean as Barney the bus driver, Barbara Pepper as Matty, Sue Randall as Jen, and Victor Paul and Laura Gile as townspeople. • Barry Morse appears in this episode.
12	12	"Glass Tightrope"	Ida Lupino	Story by : Robert C. Dennis and Barry Trivers; Teleplay by : Robert C. Dennis	Harry Carson Sioux City, Iowa	December 3, 1963	4614
Working as a stock clerk in a department store, Kimble witnesses his boss, Martin Rowland, accidentally kill a business associate in the parking lot after hours. When Kimble learns that an elderly local vagrant found near the crime scene is the prime suspect, Kimble anonymously phones Rowland to get him to confess to the murder, but Rowland and his wife, Ginny, thinking that the caller is blackmailing them, hires the store detective, Angstrom, to find the person "blackmailing" Rowland. Guest Stars: Leslie Nielsen as Martin Rowland, Diana Van der Vlis as Ginny Rowland, and Edward Binns as Angstrom. Barry Morse, who does not appear in this episode (except in the standard opening credit sequence), does not receive any billing or credit. Though Morse does not appear in the majority of Fugitive episodes, he received an on-screen credit in every single episode -- except this one.
13	13	"Terror at High Point"	Jerry Hopper	Story by : Peter Germano; Teleplay by : Peter Germano and Harry Kronman	Paul Beaumont North of Salt Lake City, Utah	December 17, 1963	4613
Working at a remote construction site in Utah, Kimble convinces his supervisor, Buck Harmon, to hire Jamie, an intellectually disabled, but physically strong young man to help out. Jamie becomes an easy target for the taunts of the other work crew members, so Kimble becomes Jamie's protector. When Jamie is accused of sexually assaulting Buck's wife, who has been teaching Jamie how to read, he becomes frightened and runs away. The crew foreman, Dan Pike, convinces Buck to organize a posse to hunt down Jamie and kill him. Kimble has to try to save him from being lynched and find out who the unknown attacker is. Guest Stars: Jack Klugman as Buck Harmon, Elizabeth Allen as Ruth Harmon, James Best as Dan Pike, and Buck Taylor as Jamie.
14	14	"The Girl from Little Egypt"	Vincent McEveety	Stanford Whitmore	George Browning/ George Norton San Francisco, California	December 24, 1963	4602
In San Francisco, Kimble is nearly run over by a car driven by Ruth Norton, a beautiful young flight attendant distraught over discovering that the man she has been dating for the past four months is married with two children. While recuperating in the hospital, a delirious Kimble flashes back to the months leading up to the night of Helen Kimble's murder and Kimble first seeing the one-armed man Fred Johnson fleeing from his house, followed by Kimble's trial, sentence, and escape from the train wreck. Ruth, who has been keeping a vigil at Kimble's bedside, hears him mutter Helen's name. Aware of his real identity, Ruth takes Kimble, who is going by George Browning, to her apartment to recover. In turn, Kimble helps her realize the married man she's dating, Paul, is not right for her. Guest Stars: Pamela Tiffin as Ruth Norton, Diane Brewster as Helen Kimble, Ed Nelson as Paul Clemments, and Jerry Paris as Jim Prestwick. • Barry Morse appears. • Bill Raisch appears uncredited as The One-Armed Man; this is the first glimpse we have of this character. The shots of the One-Armed Man seen in the opening credits of seasons two through four are taken from this episode.
15	15	"Home Is the Hunted"	Jerry Hopper	Arthur Weiss	N/A Stafford, Indiana	January 7, 1964	4616
Kimble returns to his hometown of Stafford, Indiana, after learning that his father, John, has suffered a heart attack. John has donated his medical library to the University of Wisconsin and is in the process of selling the family home. While Kimble hides out at the home of his loving sister, Donna, and her sympathetic husband, Leonard, he blames himself for their father's condition. Kimble is further troubled by his younger brother, Ray, who believes Kimble is guilty and thinks he's to blame for ruining his life, since people see Ray as "the brother of a killer." Meanwhile, Gerard arrives in town to search for Kimble and focuses on Donna and Leonard, who try to shake off the relentless detective long enough for Kimble to get out of town before he gets caught. First, though, Richard must convince Ray of his innocence - even to the point of turning himself in. Guest Stars: Robert Keith as John Kimble, Andrew Prine as Ray Kimble, Jacqueline Scott as Donna Kimble Taft, James Sikking as Leonard Taft, Paul Birch as Captain Carpenter, Bill Mumy as David Taft, and Clint Howard as Billy Taft. • Barry Morse appears in this episode.
16	16	"The Garden House"	Ida Lupino	Sheldon Stark	Sanford Westborne, Connecticut	January 14, 1964	4617
Kimble is working as the caretaker at a spacious ranch in Connecticut, which is owned by newspaper heiress Ann Guthrie (guest star Peggy McCay), who lives with her husband Harlan (guest star Robert Webber) and her sister Carol (guest star Pippa Scott). Ann and Carol's late father founded the Westborne Clarion, the newspaper that Harlan currently runs. Although Ann is the sole benefactor of her father's estate, she believes Carol is entitled to part of the fortune. Unfortunately, Ann is unaware that the greedy Carol is having an affair with Harlan and they plot to murder Ann and make it look like an accident so that they can claim everything. When Kimble suspects Carol and Harlan's plan and informs Ann, the skeptic heiress refuses to believe Kimble. Once Harlan and Carol figure out that Kimble knows, the crafty couple plot to frame him for Ann's murder. Filming began on November 19, 1963 but was stopped for a day after news of President John F. Kennedy's assassination broke.
17	17	"Come Watch Me Die"	Laslo Benedek	Story by : Perry Bleecker; Teleplay by : Stanford Whitmore	Ben Rogers Black Moccasin, Tyler County, Nebraska	January 21, 1964	4615
While working as a farmhand in a small Nebraska town, Kimble witnesses the arrest of a local man named Bellows, who is suspected of a double murder. Kimble finds himself deputized by Deputy Bowers to help transport Bellows to the county jail, along with four witnesses who saw Bellows fleeing from a farmhouse which was the scene of the crime. Although Bellows convinces Kimble that he, like Kimble with his wife's murder, is an innocent victim of circumstantial evidence, the townsmen remain unswayed. That night when the men get drunk and decide to lynch Bellows, Kimble helps him escape, but Kimble is betrayed when Bellows, who really did kill the farm couple, escapes and holds another farm couple hostage. Guest Stars: Robert Doyle as Bellows, Bruce Dern as Charley Bright, and Diane Ladd as Stella.
18	18	"Where the Action Is"	James Sheldon	Harry Kronman	Jerry Shelton Reno, Nevada	January 28, 1964	4609
While working as a hotel lifeguard in Reno, Nevada, Kimble is caught in the middle of a feud between the hotel owner, Dan Polichek, and his spoiled and rambunctious teenage daughter Christine. Christine believes her father drove away her mother, who committed suicide years ago, and she sets out to disgrace her father by provoking bar fights and humiliating herself, but goes too far when she pretends to be having an affair with the reluctant Kimble. Guest Stars: Telly Savalas as Dan Polichek and Joanna Frank as Christine Polichek. Exterior shots with Janssen were filmed in Reno, Nevada.
19	19	"Search in a Windy City"	Jerry Hopper	Stuart Jerome	N/A Chicago, Illinois	February 4, 1964	4618
In Chicago, Kimble contacts Mike Decker, a newspaper columnist who defended Kimble during his trial, unaware the newspaper man is under pressure from his boss to either find the killer or to turn Kimble over to the police to get a big story. Kimble and Decker organize a city-wide search for the one-armed man, but things get complicated with the arrival of Decker's alcoholic wife, Paula, who gets nervous of Kimble's presence and falls off the wagon. Meanwhile, Gerard learns about Decker's search for a one-armed man and decides to use the writer to set a trap for Kimble. Guest Stars: Pat Hingle as Mike Decker, and Nan Martin as Paula Decker. • Barry Morse appears in this episode. • Bill Raisch appears uncredited as The One-Armed Man.
20	20	"Bloodline"	John Erman	Story by : John Hawkins and Harry Kronman; Teleplay by : Harry Kronman	Dick Lindsey Bodin Russet Kennel, Virginia	February 11, 1964	4619
Kimble works as a kennel man for Max Bodin, a breeder of prize-winning Irish Setter show dogs and who is currently putting his kennel up for sale. Max's son, Johnny, and Johnny's wife, Cora, discover that one of the dogs has developed hip dysplasia, which means that all of the dogs in the bloodline will likely inherit the condition and be worthless as show dogs, but they keep the news from Max because they plot to live off the sale. When Kimble stumbles onto their plan, they decide to have him investigated. Guest Stars: Nancy Malone as Cora Bodin, George Voskovec as Max Bodin, John Considine as Johnny Bodin, Parley Baer as Lee Burroughs, Dan Barton as Lt. Wally Samson, Lew Brown as Sgt. Hackett, and Scotty Morrow as J.T. Thayer.
21	21	"Rat in a Corner"	Jerry Hopper	Story by : William Wood; Teleplay by : Sheldon Stark and William Wood	Dan Crowley Youngstown/Bolton, Ohio	February 18, 1964	4620
Herbie Grant, a second rate hoodlum, is shot in the leg while trying to rob a liquor store where Kimble works. Herbie later takes Kimble hostage where Herbie claims that although he tried to rob the store, he is innocent of two other liquor store robberies in the other towns. Kimble agrees to help clear Herbie, so he lets Kimble go. Kimble is summoned to the local police station to give his statement on the robbery, where he is recognized by Herbie's sister, Lorna, who works at the local post office. She threatens to turn Kimble in unless he turns over her brother, whom she believes to be guilty of all robberies. At a local motel where Herbie is staying he is recognized by a maid who calls the police and they arrest him. Thinking that Kimble double crossed him, Herbie reports Kimble to the police. Guest Stars: Warren Oates as Herbie Grant, and Virginia Vincent as Lorna Grant.
22 23	22 23	"Angels Travel on Lonely Roads"	Walter Grauman	Al C. Ward	Nick Walker Nevada (Part 1); Nevada and California (Part 2)	February 25, 1964 March 3, 1964	4621 4622
On the run from the Nevada State Police, Kimble hitches a ride with Sister Veronica, a nun traveling to Sacramento, where she plans to renounce her vows. After fixing her car when it breaks down, Kimble agrees to travel with Veronica only to the nearest train station, but Veronica believes Kimble to be somehow sent by Heaven and insists that he travel with her all the way to Sacramento. Kimble and Sister Veronica continue their journey to Sacramento, unaware that the Nevada State Police have put up a roadblock at the state line. While Kimble deals with a disgruntled ranch hand named Chuck Mathers, who suspects his true identity, Sister Veronica accidentally discovers Kimble's identity through a TV news report, but she does not tell Kimble about her knowledge of who he really is. Guest Stars: Eileen Heckart as Sister Veronica, Albert Salmi as Chuck Mathers, and Ruta Lee as Janet (Part 2).
24	24	"Flight from the Final Demon"	Jerry Hopper	Philip Saltzman	Al Dexter Meadville, Michigan	March 10, 1964	4623
While working as a health club masseur, Kimble is recognized by Sheriff Bray, a local lawman with political aspirations. Kimble manages to escape with the help of a co-worker, Steve Edson. After revealing his secret to Steve, Kimble learns that Steve is a fugitive of his conscience because five months earlier, Steve was tried and acquitted for the murder of his girlfriend Linda's abusive brother—a murder that Steve actually committed. Steve cannot live with the guilt over having gotten away with it. Kimble reluctantly lets Steve travel with him, but Steve begins leaving behind clues that soon put Sheriff Bray back on their trail, including contacting Linda for help, and letting her vengeful other brother, Joey, track them down. Guest Stars: Ed Nelson as Steve Edson, Ellen Madison as Linda, and Carroll O'Connor as Sheriff Bray.
25	25	"Taps for a Dead War"	William A. Graham	Story by : Harry Kronman and Merwin Gerard; Teleplay by : Harry Kronman	Bob Davies Springfield, Illinois	March 17, 1964	4624
While working as a roller rink supervisor, Kimble is recognized by the horribly scarred Joe Hallop, a former Korean War veteran who blames Kimble for his condition. Apparently back in the Korean War, Kimble was nearly killed in an enemy grenade explosion in which Joe shielded Kimble and got his face disfigured in the process. Knocked out, Kimble never knew who saved his life. Joe plots to lure Kimble into a remote area to either disfigure him or to kill him by using his one of his war mementoes: a live grenade. Guest Stars: Tim O'Connor as Joe Hallop, and Lee Grant as Millie Hallop
26	26	"Somebody to Remember"	Jerry Hopper	Robert C. Dennis	Johnny Sherman Unknown	March 24, 1964	4625
While working as a warehouse worker, Kimble is recognized by the Greek-born owner, Gus Priamos. Gus tells Kimble that he is dying from cancer and has only six months to live and hopes he can aid him with a scheme to make it look that Kimble has fled the country to Greece, but when Gus' jealous girlfriend, Sophie, learns Kimble's identity through a magazine article, she contacts Gerard and gives him a heads-up on Kimble and Gus' plan. Guest Stars: Gilbert Roland as Gus Priamos, Madlyn Rhue as Sophia, and Paul Birch as Captain Carpenter. • Barry Morse appears in this episode.
27	27	"Never Stop Running"	William A. Graham	Sheldon Stark	Doc Bellinda, New Mexico	March 31, 1964	4626
While working as a migrant worker in New Mexico, Kimble becomes an unwilling party to the kidnapping of a young boy who is the son of his landowner boss. The boy, Jimmie, has been abducted by Ralph Simmons, a disgruntled former pro-football player, along with his wife Helen, and his cousin Dave, who want a ransom of $200,000. When Kimble discovers that Jimmie is a haemophiliac and that Ralph has bruised him during the abduction, Kimble must find a way to get the boy away from the kidnappers and to a hospital or Jimmie will soon die from internal bleeding. Guest Stars: Claude Akins as Ralph Simmons, Joanna Moore as Helen Simmons, Wright King as Dave Simmons, and Michael Petit as Jimmy.
28	28	"The Homecoming"	Jerry Hopper	Peter Germano	David Benton Tidewater, Georgia	April 7, 1964	4627
While working as a research technician for the wealthy Allan Pruitt, Kimble gets involved in the business of Allan's teenage daughter, Janice, who returns home after spending a year in a mental hospital recovering from a nervous breakdown after witnessing a young boy under her care getting mauled and killed by two vicious stray dogs. Allan's new wife, Dorina, does not take a liking to Janice and plots to drive her insane by hiring a neighbour to make his pet dogs bark in the nearby woods and convince Janice that the dogs are alive, even though they were captured and put to sleep by the local dog catcher. When Kimble claims that he has heard the dogs barking, Dorina asks the local sheriff to investigate Kimble to find any dirt on him. Guest Stars: Shirley Knight as Janice Pruitt, Richard Carlson as Allan Pruitt, and Gloria Grahame as Dorina Pruitt.
29	29	"Storm Center"	William A. Graham	George Eckstein	Larry Phelps Webers Landing/ Key Blanca, Florida	April 14, 1964	4628
While working as a dock worker in Florida, Kimble is recognized by Marcie King (guest star Bethel Leslie), a young woman who five years earlier asked Kimble to perform an abortion for her, which is illegal. Kimble refused and Marcie went to another second-rate doctor to have it done, but after the operation, because of complications, Marcie can no longer have children and she blames Kimble for it. When a hurricane hits the area, Marcie and her boyfriend, Harry (Dennis Patrick), an embezzler on the run from the law, approach Kimble and threaten to turn him in unless he drives them to safety from the hurricane and the police looking for them. During the journey by boat, Harry falls overboard and is apparently lost at sea, making Kimble and Marcie venture on to a safehouse on a small island in the Florida Keys where they are forced to wait out the storm.
30	30	"The End Game"	Jerry Hopper	Stanford Whitmore	N/A Chicago, Illinois	April 21, 1964	4629
A discarded photograph, with Kimble in the background, leads Gerard to Chicago, where he assembles a team of detectives to trap Kimble within an eight-block radius of the city. With Kimble wandering from place to place and being recognized by whomever he comes into contact with, he flees from both policemen and local citizens, finding refuge in a small house, which is the home of two bickering middle-aged men who have long argued over the Fugitive's innocence. Guest Stars: Joseph Campanella as Lt. Spencer, John McGiver as Jake Devlin, John Fiedler as Sam Reed, Christopher Connelly as J.J. Watson the Surfer, Stuart Margolin as Jimmy, Lee Krieger as the Vendor, Chick Hearn as the TV Newscaster, Martine Bartlett as the Streetwalker, Martin Garralaga as Gardner, Richard Chambers as the Photographer, and Gil Frye as the Officer. • Barry Morse appears in this episode.
