= Adam Klugman =

American media strategist and campaign consultant

- Born: Adam Somers Klugman; July 11, 1963 (age 63)
- Occupations: Media strategist, campaign consultant
- Political party: Democratic
- Parent(s): Brett Somers; Jack Klugman
- Relatives: Jim Fyfe (brother-in-law); Brian Klugman (first cousin once removed)

Adam Somers Klugman (born July 11, 1963) is an American media strategist and campaign consultant. He and his older brother David are the sons of stage, film, and television actor Jack Klugman and actress, singer, and comedian Brett Somers. He had an older half-sister Leslie Klein (d. 2003) from his mother's first marriage. As a child, Adam appeared with his father on The Odd Couple.

He was a top-10 finalist in the 2003 MoveOn.org "Bushin30Seconds" contest and winner of the 2004 Democratic National Committee (DNC) Video Contest with "America's Party". His more recent projects include Mad As Hell Doctors and First Freedom First.

A resident of West Linn, Oregon, Klugman has worked on local elections, including ones for "No Growth" candidates in West Linn and for Oregon Ballot Measure 49. From 2010 to 2012, he hosted a radio show called Mad as Hell in America with Adam Klugman.
