= Garry Walberg =

American character actor (1921–2012)

- Walberg in Quincy, M.E., 1978
- Born: Gerrit Christian Walberg Jr; June 10, 1921; Buffalo, New York, U.S.
- Died: March 27, 2012 (aged 90); Northridge, California, U.S
- Occupation: Actor
- Years active: 1952–1993
- Height: 1.7 m (5 ft 7 in)
- Spouses: Florence M Apostol (m. 1987–2012); Patsy Collett (m. 1961; div. 1969), 2 children; Betty (divorced)

Gerrit Christian Walberg Jr. (June 10, 1921 – March 27, 2012) was an American character actor primarily known for his work on television. He guest-starred in numerous TV shows from the early 1950s until the early 1990s, including Johnny Staccato, Perry Mason, Lassie, Peyton Place, Gunsmoke (in 1959 as "Tobe" in "Buffalo Hunter", in 1961 as "Hatcher" in "A Man and A Day", in 1963 as "Anson" in "Two of a Kind" and in 1974 as "Toby" in "The Tarnished Badge"), The Fugitive, Star Trek, Columbo, The Tony Randall Show and The Rockford Files. He appeared in the premiere episode of The Twilight Zone, titled "Where Is Everybody?".

Walberg is probably best known for his role as LAPD Homicide detective Lt. Frank Monahan in Quincy, M.E. (1976–83), starring his close friend, Jack Klugman in the title role. Walberg had previously been seen alongside Klugman in The Odd Couple (1970–75) in the recurring role of Oscar's poker crony, Homer "Speed" Deegan. He reprised the role in the 1993 TV movie The Odd Couple: Together Again. This was his final acting appearance.

== Personal life and death ==
Walberg was born in Buffalo, New York. Married and divorced twice, Walberg married his third wife, Florence M. Apostol, on September 12, 1987.

Walberg died from Chronic pulmonary disease (CPD) and congestive heart failure in March 2012 in Northridge, California, at the age of 90. In the months prior to his passing, he was a player in the Carl Memorial Alzheimer's Poker Game, where he lived.

== Partial filmography ==
Year	Title	Role	Notes
1959	Gangster Story	Adolph	
1959-1960	Rawhide	Various roles	3 episodes
1959-1960	Johnny Staccato	Sgt. Sullivan	5 episodes
1959-1974	Gunsmoke	Various roles	10 episodes
1960	Tales of Wells Fargo	Chris Matson	1 episode, "Frightened Witness"
1962-1973	Lassie	Various roles	8 episodes
1963-1967	The Fugitive	Various roles	4 episodes
1965-1968	Peyton Place	Sgt. Goddard	33 episodes
1966	The Virginian	Harry Weatherby	1 episode, "One Spring Like Long Ago"
1966	Star Trek	Hansen	S1:E14, "Balance of Terror"
1969	Charro!	Martin Tilford	
1969	The Maltese Bippy	Harold Fenster	
1969	Tell Them Willie Boy Is Here	Dr. Mills	
1970	They Call Me Mister Tibbs!	Medical Examiner	
1970-1974	The Odd Couple	Homer "Speed" Deegan	13 episodes
1971	The Andromeda Strain	Technician	Uncredited
1971	The Organization	Capt. Stacy	
1972	The Man	Pierce	
1972	When the Legends Die	School Superintendent	
1974	Mannix	Danny	S8 E11
1976	Revenge of the Cheerleaders	State Inspector	
1976	King Kong	Army General	
1976	Two-Minute Warning	Governor Ogden	
1976-1983	Quincy, M.E.	Detective Monahan	145 episodes
1977	MacArthur	General Walker	
1987	The Spirit	Commissioner Dolan	TV pilot/movie
1989	Murder, She Wrote	Sam Kendall	1 episode, "Class Act"
1993	The Odd Couple Together Again	Homer "Speed" Deegan	final role
