= Brett Somers =

Canadian-American actress and game-show personality (1924–2007)

- Born: Audrey Dawn Johnston; July 11, 1924; Miramichi, New Brunswick, Canada
- Died: September 15, 2007 (aged 83); Westport, Connecticut, U.S.
- Other names: Brett Somers Klugman, Audrey Klugman, Dawn Johnston
- Occupations: Actress; comedian; singer; game show panelist; writer
- Years active: 1955–2007
- Spouses: Robert H. Klein (m. 1948, divorced) Jack Klugman (m. 1953; div. 1977)
- Children: 3, including Adam Klugman

Brett Somers (born Audrey Dawn Johnston; July 11, 1924 – September 15, 2007) was a Canadian-American game-show personality, actress, and singer. Somers was best known as a panelist on the 1970s game show Match Game and for her recurring role as Blanche Madison opposite her real-life husband, actor Jack Klugman, on ABC's The Odd Couple.

== Early life ==
Born Audrey Dawn Johnston in Halcomb, near Miramichi, New Brunswick, Canada, Somers grew up near Portland, Maine. At age 18, she moved to New York City to pursue a career in acting, settling in Greenwich Village.

== Career ==
=== Early career ===
A member of the Actors Studio from 1952, Somers began her career in theater and made many of her initial television appearances in dramatic programs such as The Philco Television Playhouse, Kraft Television Theatre, Playhouse 90, The Naked City and Robert Montgomery Presents.

Her Broadway debut was in the play Maybe Tuesday. The show was a flop and closed after just five performances. She also appeared onstage in productions of Happy Ending, The Seven Year Itch, and The Country Girl, the last opposite Klugman. She also amassed a number of film credits, including A Rage to Live and Bus Riley's Back in Town.

=== Television credits ===
Somers made many appearances on episodic primetime television, including Love, American Style; The Defenders; Have Gun Will Travel; Ben Casey; CHiPs; The Love Boat; Barney Miller and The Fugitive. In 1973 she played Rhoda Morgenstern's Aunt Rose in the season four episode "Rhoda's Sister Gets Married" on The Mary Tyler Moore Show.

She had a recurring role as Blanche, the former wife of Oscar Madison (played by real-life spouse Jack Klugman) on the ABC sitcom The Odd Couple in the early 1970s. In 1973 she played Perry Mason's receptionist Gertie on The New Perry Mason, a short-lived revival of the classic TV series, with Monte Markham as Perry Mason. She played the role of Siress Belloby on the 1978 science-fiction series Battlestar Galactica.

=== Match Game ===
Somers was best known for her appearances as a panelist in the 1970s CBS game show Match Game. For her debut episodes she sat in the lower-left panel position, but for the remainder of her tenure she occupied the center seat of the upper tier, most often next to Charles Nelson Reilly, who joined as a regular around the same time as Somers and settled into the top-right seat. She was clearly left-handed as she was always seen writing her answers with her left hand.

The show became known for somewhat outlandish and risque dialogue, sometimes being described as a game played at a cocktail party. Somers was a familiar on-screen presence, wearing enormous eyeglasses and various wigs. She played foil to Charles Nelson Reilly, Betty White, Scoey Mitchell, Fannie Flagg and many others. Somers was sometimes the subject of questions on Match Game, such as "You may or may not believe in reincarnation, but listen to this. In a previous life, Brett used to be a ________."

Somers was not originally considered for the celebrity panel. When spouse Jack Klugman appeared during the first week of the program in 1973, he insisted that the producers bring her aboard. She remained a regular panelist for the rest of the show's nine-year network and syndicated run. Her appearances on Match Game led radio personality Robin Quivers to impersonate her in parodies of such game shows on The Howard Stern Show. Quivers' impersonation of Somers was featured in the film Private Parts.

In 2002, she appeared with Charles Nelson Reilly and Betty White (via videolink) as part of a Match Game reunion on the CBS program The Early Show. She appeared with Reilly on Hollywood Squares during that show's "Game Show Week" in the same year. In 2006, she was a prominent interviewee in The Real Match Game Story: Behind The Blank on GSN and also hosted the Match Game DVD.

=== Other work ===
She appeared in a cabaret show, An Evening with Brett Somers, in 2003–04.

In 2004, she appeared on the PBS concert special "Magic Moments – The Best of '50s Pop". In the two-minute segment, hosted by Wink Martindale, Somers was a member of a faux quiz-show panel with Dr. Joyce Brothers and Rip Taylor.

== Personal life ==
In 1948, after settling in New York, Somers married businessman Robert H. Klein. Together they had one child, Leslie Klein (who died of lung cancer in 2003), and their marriage ended in divorce. In 1953, she married actor Jack Klugman, with whom she had two sons, David and Adam.

It was long, mistakenly reported that Somers and Klugman separated in 1974 but remained legally married until her death, a belief furthered by the fact that Klugman waited until after Somers died to marry his second wife. However, California court records indicate the couple actually divorced in August 1977.

Her chosen first name, Brett, came from the lead female character in Ernest Hemingway's The Sun Also Rises. Her chosen surname, Somers, was her mother's maiden name.

Somers became a U.S. citizen shortly before her death.

== Death ==
During a 2002 interview Somers denied rumors that she had cancer, which she reiterated in later interviews. Somers had a naturally husky voice that led some to believe that she suffered from a throat ailment.

However, in 2004 she was diagnosed with cancer, and following a period of remission, she died on September 15, 2007, at her home in Westport, Connecticut, at age 83. Her younger son, Adam, gave the cause of her death as stomach and colon cancer. GSN hosted a daylong tribute to Somers, showcasing her most memorable appearances on Match Game.
