= A Passage for Trumpet =

- The Twilight Zone episode
- Episode no.: Season 1 Episode 32
- Directed by: Don Medford
- Written by: Rod Serling
- Production code: 173-3633
- Original air date: May 20, 1960

Guest appearances
- Jack Klugman as Joey Crown; Frank Wolff as Baron; John Anderson as Gabe; Mary Webster as Nan; Ned Glass as Nate (Pawnshop Owner); James Flavin as Truck Driver

Episode chronology
← Previous "The Chaser"	Next → "Mr. Bevis"
- The Twilight Zone season 1

"A Passage for Trumpet" is the thirty-minute episode of the American television series The Twilight Zone.

== Opening narration ==
Joey Crown, musician with an odd, intense face, whose life is a quest for impossible things like flowers in concrete or like trying to pluck a note of music out of the air and put it under glass to treasure.

The narration continues after dialogue between Joey and Baron.

Joey Crown, musician with an odd, intense face, who, in a moment, will try to leave the Earth and discover the middle ground - the place we call The Twilight Zone.

== Plot ==
Joey Crown is a hapless trumpet player in New York City; he has no money, no friends, and no job prospects due to alcoholism. Looking for a chance to work again, he is turned down by the manager at his old club, who while appreciating Joey's abilities, knows how unreliable he is. Joey feels his life is worthless. He sells his beloved trumpet at a pawn shop for cash, then after a drinking binge impulsively steps into the path of a speeding truck. When he regains consciousness, he realizes that nobody can see or hear him and assumes that he is dead. None of the people he sees are ones he recognizes, though he goes to places with which he is familiar.

Joey makes his way back to the night club where he is surprised to meet another trumpet player who can not only see him but also recognizes him. He explains that Joey is in "a kind of limbo"; it is all the people he encountered who are actually dead. He offers Joey a choice to return to the living if he so chooses while reminding him that he must "take what you get and you live with it." With the man's encouragement, Joey decides that he wants to go back, but first he asks for the man's name and the answer is, "Call me Gabe, [...] short for Gabriel."

Joey wakes up on the street after the collision and is shaken but uninjured. The nervous driver of the truck quickly pushes some money into Joey's hand, saying that his driving record is on the line. Joey buys his trumpet back. Later that night, he is playing the trumpet alone on his apartment building's roof, when a young woman whose laundry is hanging there approaches him to express her admiration. She introduces herself as Nan and says that she is new to the city. After seeing that she is romantically interested in him, an excited Joey offers to show her around town.

== Closing narration ==
Joey Crown, who makes music, and who discovered something about life; that it can be rich and rewarding and full of beauty, just like the music he played, if a person would only pause to look and to listen. Joey Crown, who got his clue in the Twilight Zone.

== Production notes ==
In his "limbo" state, Joey's reflection is supposed to be absent from any mirrors, but his reflection is clearly visible twice - once in the window of the theater ticket counter and the other in a jukebox against which he was leaning.

Uan Rasey, a veteran studio trumpeter, played for Klugman on the soundtrack.

== Reception ==
In a review for The A.V. Club, Zack Handlen described the episode as "a lovely, low-key story" that was crucially held up by the presence of Jack Klugman (who ultimately appeared in four Twilight Zone episodes).
