= The Odd Couple Together Again =

TV film

- Genre: Comedy; Drama
- Based on: characters by Neil Simon
- Screenplay by: Robert Klane
- Directed by: Robert Klane
- Starring: Jack Klugman; Tony Randall; Barbara Barrie; Jim Haynie; Toni Kalem; Garry Walberg; Jerry Adler; Penny Marshall
- Music by: Charles Fox
- Country of origin: United States
- Original language: English

Production
- Producer: Howard W. Koch
- Cinematography: Peter Woeste
- Editor: Alan James Geik
- Running time: 90 minutes
- Production companies: Howard W. Koch Productions; Paramount Television

Original release
- Network: CBS
- Release: September 24, 1993

The Odd Couple Together Again is a 1993 American made-for-television comedy-drama film starring Tony Randall and Jack Klugman as Felix Unger and Oscar Madison, respectively. It is a sequel to the original Odd Couple series in which Felix is once again rooming with Oscar, but only temporarily due to his daughter, Edna, getting married. The film aired on September 24, 1993 on CBS.

== Plot ==
In a ballroom at the Plaza Hotel, the fussy, neat, and perfectionist Felix Unger is leading a dress rehearsal for his daughter Edna's wedding. The rehearsal is cutting into the time the hotel needs to set up for another event in that ballroom. This, along with Felix giving an ultimatum over something he requested in the ballroom that hadn't been fulfilled, gets their reservation revoked by the assistant manager. Gloria, Felix's wife (whom he remarried at the end of the series), decides to kick him out of the house for two weeks in order for her to plan the wedding without him.

Felix returns to the apartment of his former roommate, Oscar Madison. Oscar's voice is now raspy and hoarse after having a vocal cord removed due to throat cancer. (In real life, Klugman had throat cancer surgery in 1989.) Felix is so touched by Oscar's cancer situation, he arranges a poker game, but tells Oscar's poker buddies - Officer Murray Greshler, Homer "Speed" Deegan, and Roy, Oscar's accountant - to always let Oscar win. However, Speed cracks and beats him and spills the beans. Oscar forgives them and resumes playing poker with them. Felix helps Oscar with voice exercises, which start to strengthen his vocal cords, enough so that Felix offers Oscar a voice-over job for a television commercial. However, Oscar is not thrilled to find out it would be for the voice of a toilet that had been cleaned with the advertised product. Felix then gets Oscar a job again with the New York Examiner newspaper, but the job is as a personal advice columnist, rather than a sportswriter. Oscar reluctantly accepts, but starts to enjoy the job once his former secretary, Myrna Turner, transfers over to help him. Eventually, he resigns and gives the job to her.

Felix holds the engagement dinner at Oscar's apartment when Gloria couldn't do so, due to painters still working. Felix bonds with Edna's fiancée, Bill Sutton, but eventually finds out that Bill has been married and divorced twice, at which things turn severely sour. Felix goes to visit Bill's first ex-wife, a cutthroat photographer. Edna asks Oscar to tell Felix to stop, adding that Bill considered calling off the wedding due to Felix embarrassing them. Oscar tries to talk Felix out of it, and Felix initially says he will stop. However, he goes to find Bill's second wife, a nudist whom Felix inadvertently had a photo taken with, which was given back to Gloria. Gloria, in turn, kicks him out of the wedding permanently and files an injunction against him. Felix asks Oscar to walk Edna down the aisle in his place and also give a speech, to which Oscar agrees.

However, Oscar makes a plan to have Felix take his place, by stopping and making an impassioned speech about him and what walking his own daughter down the aisle would mean to him. After so, Felix, who was pathetically hiding behind shrubbery, is brought into the wedding to assume the duty and nobody objects. After a very lively reception, where Edna intentionally tosses the bouquet to Oscar's girlfriend, Jeannie, before entering the limo, Oscar confesses to Felix that he is willing to accept the toilet bowl voiceover job, but Felix informs him the spot was long since taken, then offers him a spot in a potato chip ad as the voice of the deep fryer, which he accepts.

== Cast ==
- Tony Randall as Felix Unger
- Jack Klugman as Oscar Madison
- Barbara Barrie as Gloria Unger
- Toni Kalem as Edna Unger
- Garry Walberg as Homer "Speed" Deegan
- Jerry Adler as Officer Murray Greshler
- Penny Marshall as Myrna Turner
- Dick Van Patten as Roy
- Ben Lemon as Bill Sutton
- Jim Haynie as Gil Sutton
- Gloria Cromwell as Jill Sutton
- Peggy Crosby as Jeannie
- Bruce Kirby as George Zelnick
- Debra Jo Rupp as Plaza Assistant Manager
- Harvey Miller as Dr. Hegler

== Reception ==
Variety said, "The Odd Couple is often mediocre as it wanders through a two-hour slot. But the visit is a walk down memory lane and Klugman’s performance should give others in his shoes inspiration and encouragement."
