= Jane Dulo =

American actress and comedian (1917–1994)

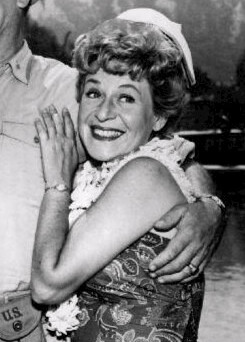
- Jane Dulo on McHale's Navy (1962)
- Born: Bernice Dewlow; October 13, 1917; Baltimore, Maryland, U.S.
- Died: May 22, 1994 (aged 76); Los Angeles, California, U.S.
- Other names: Jane Dillon
- Occupation: Actress
- Years active: 1945–1992

Jane Dulo (born Bernice Dewlow; October 13, 1917 – May 22, 1994) was an American actress and comedian.

== Early life and career ==
Born in Baltimore, Maryland, Dulo was the elder daughter of Jewish parents Lawrence Dewlow and Nettie Lurie. Her father was a Latvian immigrant; her mother was of Lithuanian descent.

Using Dulo as a stage name, she began her career at the age of ten performing in vaudeville. When she was older, an agent in New York had her change her name to Jane Dillon, which she used in night clubs in Baltimore and New York. However, when she appeared in Philadelphia in the musical Are You With It? a radio commentator named Jane Dillon in Bridgeport, Connecticut threatened to sue her. She then resumed using Dulo.

In 1964, Dulo joined the cast of The Jack Benny Program in a recurring role as Benny's cook. She appeared in Hey, Jeannie!, The Phil Silvers Show, The Joey Bishop Show, McHale's Navy (in a recurring role as nurse Molly in 1962–1965), The Dick Van Dyke Show, The Man from UNCLE (The Adriatic Express Affair), I Dream of Jeannie, My Three Sons, Get Smart (in a recurring role as agent 99's mother starting in the fourth season), Leave It to Beaver, The Andy Griffith Show, Emergency!, Gunsmoke, Medical Center, The Odd Couple, The Hudson Brothers, That Girl, Welcome Back, Kotter, The Golden Girls, and Gimme a Break!, among others.

== Death ==
Dulo died following heart surgery at Cedars-Sinai Hospital in Los Angeles, on May 22, 1994, at the age of 76. She never married and was survived by her sister, Shirley Gordon.

== Filmography ==
Year	Title	Role	Notes
1959	Alfred Hitchcock Presents	Jocelyn Barnhardt	Season 4 Episode 22 "The Right Price"
1962	Leave It To Beaver	Mrs. Rickover	
1962–1964	McHale's Navy	Nurse Molly Turner	
1964	Roustabout	Hazel	
1965	The Dick Van Dyke Show	Opal Levinger	Season 4 Episode 32 "There's No Sale Like Wholesale"
1968	Did You Hear the One About the Traveling Saleslady?	Clara Buxton	
1970	Pufnstuf	Miss Flick	
1972	The Odd Couple	Oscar Madison's Mother	Season 3 Episode 7 "The Odd Couples"
1973	Soylent Green	Mrs. Santini	
1975	Hearts of the West	Mrs. Stern	
1984	Oh, God! You Devil	Widow	
1988	Beaches	Hillary's Neighbor	
