= The Odd Couple (1970 TV series) =

American sitcom (1970–1975)

- Title card with Tony Randall and Jack Klugman
- Based on: The Odd Couple by Neil Simon
- Developed by: Garry Marshall; Jerry Belson
- Starring: Tony Randall; Jack Klugman
- Theme music composer: Neal Hefti
- Country of origin: United States
- Original language: English
- No. of seasons: 5
- No. of episodes: 114 (list of episodes)

Production
- Executive producer: Garry Marshall
- Running time: 25–26 minutes (excluding commercials)
- Production company: Paramount Television

Original release
- Network: ABC
- Release: September 24, 1970 – March 7, 1975

Related
- The Odd Couple (film); The Oddball Couple; The New Odd Couple; The Odd Couple II (film); The Odd Couple (2015)

The Odd Couple (Note: Titled onscreen Neil Simon's The Odd Couple) is an American sitcom television series broadcast from September 24, 1970, to March 7, 1975, on ABC. It ran for five seasons and has become a notable sitcom of its era. The show, which stars Tony Randall as Felix Alex Unger and Jack Klugman as Oscar Trevor Madison, was the first of several sitcoms developed by Garry Marshall for Paramount Television. The series is based on the 1965 play The Odd Couple, written by Neil Simon, which was also adapted into a 1968 film. The story examines two divorced men, Oscar and Felix, who share Oscar's Manhattan apartment, and whose contrasting personalities lead to conflict and comedy.

In 1997, the episodes "Password" and "The Fat Farm" were ranked numbers 5 and 58, respectively, on TV Guide's 100 Greatest Episodes of All Time. The show received three nominations for the Primetime Emmy Award for Outstanding Comedy Series.

== History ==
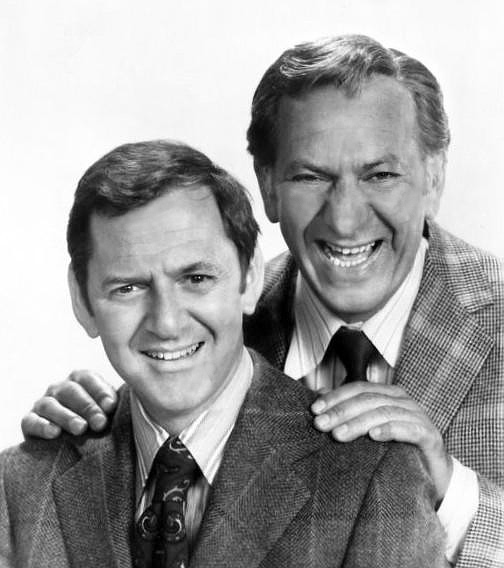
L to R: Felix (Tony Randall) and Oscar (Jack Klugman)

The success of the 1968 film (adapted from the stage play), which starred Jack Lemmon as Felix and Walter Matthau as Oscar, catalyzed the production of the television show. Mickey Rooney and Martin Balsam were also considered for the part of Oscar, and Dean Martin and Art Carney for Felix (Carney had originated the role on Broadway).

Eventually, Tony Randall (as Felix) and Jack Klugman (as Oscar) were hired; Klugman had replaced Walter Matthau as Oscar in the original Broadway production, and Randall had appeared as Felix in other productions of the play. Randall, who was hired first, wanted Mickey Rooney to play Oscar. Co-executive producer, Garry Marshall, had to lobby hard to get Klugman successfully hired. He also had his sister Penny Marshall ask Klugman if he would be interested in doing the show while they were both filming an episode of Then Came Bronson in Jackson Hole, Wyoming titled "The Runner". Once the cast was in place, the show's writers (Marshall, Jerry Belson, Jerry Paris, Bob Brunner, Mark Rothman and Lowell Ganz, among others) came up with a multitude of situations for Felix and Oscar, while staying true to the soul of the play, which always reverted to the human tensions between the two that created the comic situations.

The show premiered on ABC September 24, 1970. The first season was filmed at Paramount Studios using the single-camera method and a laugh track, using the same apartment set seen in Paramount's 1968 film version. Klugman and Randall both expressed displeasure with using a laugh track without a live audience. Marshall also disliked the practice; theater veteran Randall particularly resented the process of having to wait several seconds between punchlines to allot enough space for the laughter to be inserted. The production team eventually experimented with omitting the laugh track for the first season's 21st episode, "Oscar's New Life" (laughter was subsequently added for syndication). By the second season, ABC relented; the show was subsequently filmed with three cameras and performed like a stage play in front of a live studio audience, with laugh sweetening completed during post-production.

The change also required construction of a new, larger apartment set with a new layout, within a theater at Paramount.

Randall and Klugman both enjoyed the spontaneity that came with performing in front of a live audience; any missed or blown lines usually passed without stopping (they would be reshot during post-production). In addition, it gave the show a distinct edge that had been lost during the first season (although the actors had to deliver lines more loudly, for they were on a larger sound stage, as opposed to a quiet studio with only minimal crew present).

Klugman recalled, "We spent three days rehearsing the show. We sat around a table the first day. We tore the script apart. We took out all the jokes and put in character. The only reason we leave in any jokes is for the rotten canned laughter. I hated it. I watch the shows at home, I see Oscar come in and he says, 'Hi', and there is the laughter. 'Hey', I think, 'what the hell did I do?'. I hate it; it insults the audience."

During its five seasons on ABC, The Odd Couple was juggled several times around the network's programming schedule, never reaching the top 30 in the Nielsen ratings. However, ABC continually renewed the show because the ratings for the summer reruns were consistently high.

In the final episode, "Felix Remarries", Felix finally wins back his ex-wife, Gloria, and they remarry, and Oscar regains the freedom of living alone again. The final scene unfolds as the two say their goodbyes:

Felix: Your dinner's in the oven; turn it off in 20 minutes. [pause] Oscar... what can I say? Five years ago, you took me in; a broken man on the verge of... mental collapse. I leave here a cured human being. I owe it all to you. [gesturing toward apartment] It's all yours, buddy. I salute you. [empties waste basket onto floor]
Oscar: Felix, you know how I'm gonna salute you? I'm gonna clean that up.
Felix: It has not been in vain.
[They shake hands, and Felix exits stage left through front door. After door closes...]
Oscar: [swings hand through air] I'm not gonna clean that up. [exits stage right to bedroom; audience laughter]
[Felix sneaks back in stage left and looks at floor]
Felix: [disgustedly] I knew he wouldn't clean it up. [proceeds to pick up trash; audience applause] [fade out]

The 114 episodes went into syndication, and the series has been released on home video.

== Differences between the series and the play/film ==
- In the TV series, Felix's last name was spelled Unger, but in the play and film, it is spelled Ungar.
- In the stage play, Felix is a news writer for CBS (in the film, he writes the news for "television"), while in the TV series, he is a commercial photographer. (His slogan, which he is quick to promote, is "Portraits a specialty".)
- Felix's wife is named Frances in the play and in the film, but named Gloria in the TV series.
- In the play and film, Oscar has at least two children (including a son, "Brucey") who are referred to but not seen. In the series, Oscar is childless. In the play and film, Felix has a son and a younger daughter. In the series, the children's birth order is reversed, and they are named Leonard and Edna, after Tony Randall's middle name and the name of his sister, respectively.
- In the series, Felix is portrayed as being rather highbrow, with refined tastes in food, music, and the arts in general; he is baffled by much of popular culture. In the play and film, Felix is much more of a "regular guy": He ogles go-go dancers, plays poker, goes bowling and shoots pool. Although the pre-TV Felix enjoys cooking and prepares well-crafted sandwiches for his friends, he occasionally mentions preparing rather simple dinners, like meatloaf, franks and beans and cole slaw. When the dinner he has prepared for the Pigeon Sisters burns (meatloaf in the film, London broil in the play), he suggests substituting corned beef sandwiches from the local delicatessen.

== Supporting characters ==
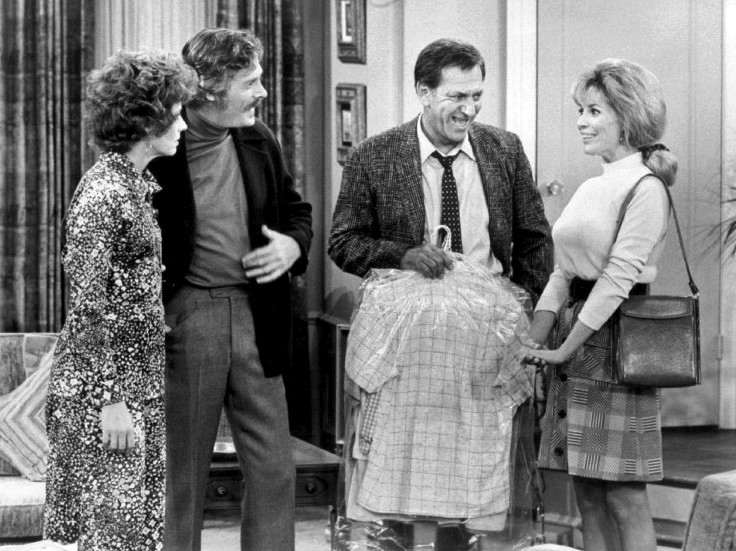
When Oscar introduces Felix's ex-wife, Gloria, to his girlfriend, Nancy, and her brother, Ray (Fred Beir), trouble erupts when Gloria starts dating Ray.

The Pigeon Sisters (Monica Evans as Cecily and Carole Shelley as Gwendolyn, reprising their roles from the Broadway stage play and the film) make four appearances during the first season. The sisters are never seen again, but are occasionally mentioned. During the latter part of the first season and half of the second, Oscar's steady girlfriend is Dr. Nancy Cunningham (portrayed by Joan Hotchkis), a physician whose colleague Dr. Melnitz (played by Bill Quinn) is a curmudgeonly and sardonic older doctor who treats both Felix and Oscar. Beginning in the third season, Felix also has a girlfriend, Miriam Welby (portrayed by Elinor Donahue), and they last into the fifth season, presumably parting ways before Felix and Gloria remarry in the series finale. Christopher Shea appears as Phillip Wexler, Felix and Oscar's 11-year-old neighbor, in three episodes of the first season. Oscar makes frequent references to "Crazy Rhoda Zimmerman", his occasional good-time girlfriend, but she never appears onscreen.

The TV series also features their ex-wives. Janis Hansen appears as Felix's former wife Gloria (named Frances in the play and film), and Jack Klugman's wife Brett Somers portrays Blanche, Oscar's acerbic ex-wife (the couple separated in real life during the final season of the series). There are several episodes in which Felix feels that he has not tried hard enough to reconcile with Gloria and takes comically drastic measures to try to win her back. In contrast, Oscar seems quite happy to be divorced from Blanche, and she from him, as the two constantly trade sarcastic barbs. The only major drawback from Oscar's point of view is the alimony that he has been ordered to pay.

Willie Aames and Leif Garrett appear as Felix's son Leonard. Pamelyn Ferdin and Doney Oatman appear as Felix's teenaged daughter Edna.

The two other major supporting characters, Officer Murray Greshler and Myrna Turner, Oscar's secretary, are portrayed by Al Molinaro and Penny Marshall (Garry's sister), respectively.

Alice Ghostley plays Murray's wife Mimi Greshler in one episode of the first season, when Felix quickly outstays his welcome after moving out of Oscar's apartment. Jane Dulo appears as Mimi in an episode from the third season. Garry Walberg, Larry Gelman and Ryan MacDonald portray Oscar's poker buddies, Homer "Speed" Deegan, the balding, bespectacled Vincent "Vinnie" Barella, and Roy, Oscar's accountant, respectively. MacDonald left the show after the seventh of the first season's eight episodes in which there was a poker game, and the character of Roy is occasionally mentioned afterwards but never seen again. Both Walberg (who later worked with his friend Klugman from 1976 to 1983 on the series Quincy, M.E.) as "Speed" and Gelman as Vinnie make several scattered guest appearances after the first season.

Character actor Richard Stahl appears in nine episodes as, among other things, a florist, a pet-shop owner, a psychiatrist, a volunteer fireman and a non-denominational monk, never playing the same role twice. Veteran character actor Herbie Faye appears in six episodes, including four in which he plays Harvey Faffner, the superintendent of Oscar and Felix's apartment building. Character actor Phil Leeds appears three times on the series in various roles.

Oscar's mother Elizabeth Madison appears in two episodes, played once by Elvia Allman and once by Jane Dulo, both veteran actresses. Tina Andrews appears in two fifth-season episodes as Tina, Oscar's new secretary, following Penny Marshall's departure from the series. Character actor John Fiedler, who portrays Vinnie in the 1968 film version, makes two guest appearances in different roles. Veteran stand-up comedian Leonard Barr appears in five episodes.

== Celebrity guest stars ==
=== As themselves ===
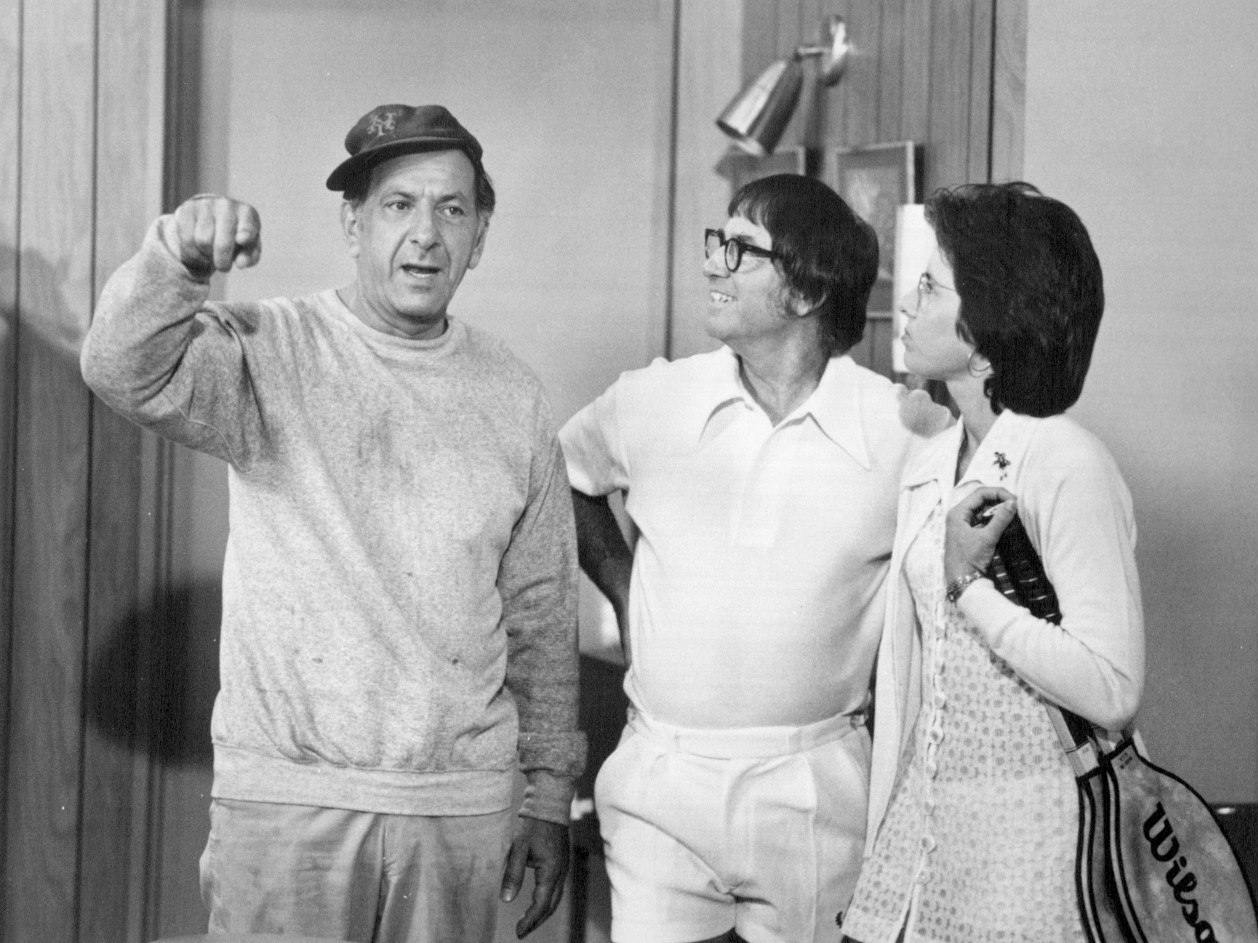
Oscar with Bobby Riggs and Billie Jean King

The show often has celebrity guest stars, most of whom reflect the cultural leanings of either Oscar or Felix, whether playing themselves or fictional characters.

Sportscaster Howard Cosell (two episodes) and ABC television producer Roone Arledge play themselves. ABC News anchorman Howard K. Smith appears as himself in an episode in which Oscar runs for city council. Pop singer Jaye P. Morgan plays herself as one of Oscar's many girlfriends. Opera singers Martina Arroyo and Richard Fredricks appear as themselves. In one episode, noted tennis frenemies and real-life competitors Bobby Riggs and Billie Jean King appear as themselves.

Singer-songwriter Paul Williams appears in an episode in which Felix's daughter Edna runs away to follow Williams on tour. Dick Clark makes an appearance as himself, a radio disc jockey who phones Oscar with a quiz in which he wins a new car. Neil Simon (the author of the play on which the series is based) makes an uncredited cameo appearance during the fifth season in "Two on the Aisle", as does Bob Hope in "The Hollywood Story".

Other celebrities appearing as themselves include David Steinberg, Monty Hall, Richard Dawson, Wolfman Jack, Hugh Hefner, Edward Villella, Rodney Allen Rippy, John Simon, Bubba Smith, Deacon Jones, John Barbour, Allen Ludden and Betty White.

=== Fictional depictions ===
- Marilyn Horne as Jackie Hartman, a very talented but shy singer, who is a coworker of Oscar's.
- Roy Clark as "Wild" Willie Boggs, an old practical-joke-playing friend of Oscar's, who nonetheless has enormous musical talent, impressing Felix.
- Jean Simmons as Princess Lydia from the fictional European country of Liechtenbourg (Peggy Rea plays her lady-in-waiting), who meets Felix in a photography session but goes on a date with Oscar, and he comes home boasting of a wonderful time. He proudly relates that the princess had a wonderful time also, and that "she knighted a wino".
- Pernell Roberts as Billy Joe Grissom, a country music impresario to whom Oscar owes a lot of money in gambling debts, and who does not take IOUs.
- Jack Soo as Chuk Mai Chin, a Chinese wrestler.
- Reta Shaw as Claire Frost, a tough retired Army colonel who works as a housekeeper when Oscar is sick and Felix is busy. She hails from Bayonne, New Jersey, and her domineering ways cause Oscar to derisively refer to her as "The Beast of Bayonne".
- Penny Marshall, who portrays Oscar's secretary Myrna Turner, makes her last appearance in an episode in which she marries Sheldn Stimler (his legal name due to the "o" having been omitted from his birth certificate), played by Rob Reiner, Marshall's husband at the time. Marshall's real-life brother and sister, Garry and Ronny, play Myrna's siblings, Werner Turner and Verna Turner, in the same episode.
- Victor Buono appears twice: as Dr. Clove, an "exorcist" in an episode inspired by the film The Exorcist, in which the boys think their apartment is haunted; and as Hugo Lovelace, the eccentric new manager of the building in which Felix and Oscar live, who loves plants but hates people.
- Albert Brooks as Rudy Mandel, a pretentious advertising colleague of Felix's (in two episodes in the show's first season).
- William Redfield as Felix's brother Floyd Unger, owner of Unger Gum in Buffalo, New York.
- Fritz Feld as a maitre d' in a fancy restaurant that Oscar and Felix dine in when Oscar starts winning betting on horse racing.
- Grady Sutton as "Pop" Belkin, an elderly barnstorming pilot who shows Oscar and Felix some of his stunts.
- Giorgio Tozzi as the "Big Boss", Oscar's father's boss at a Chicago speakeasy.

== Awards and nominations ==
During its original run, the show had mediocre ratings at best (the show was never among the top 30 programs on the Nielsen ratings list during its entire run). Nonetheless, both actors were nominated for Emmy Awards in each year of the show's run. Jack Klugman won two Emmys for his work (in 1971 and 1973), and Tony Randall won an Emmy as well (in 1975; on accepting the award, he commented on the fact that he wished he "had a job", for the show had recently been canceled).

Klugman was nominated for a Golden Globe in 1972, and won one in 1974. The show was also nominated for an Emmy Award for Outstanding Comedy Series in 1971, 1972 and 1974. To date, these are the last Emmy nominations to a sitcom airing on a Friday night.

== Opening narration and credit sequence ==
For the first three seasons, the program's opening credit sequence consists of Felix and Oscar in various humorous situations around New York City. These scenes include Felix trying, to no avail, to help an old lady cross the street, Oscar walking into wet cement while ogling a girl, Oscar eating a hot dog and getting chili on his shirt, and both men cavorting around a maypole. The end of the title sequence for the first three seasons shows the duo sitting on a park bench in front of the William Tecumseh Sherman Monument in Grand Army Plaza at West 58th Street and Fifth Avenue, where Oscar throws his lunch wrapper on the ground while Felix beckons him to pick it up.

Halfway through the show's debut season, a "prologue" was added to the introduction, and features a narration (provided by actor Bill Woodson) retelling how Felix and Oscar came to live together:

On November 13, Felix Unger was asked to remove himself from his place of residence. That request came from his wife. Deep down, he knew she was right. But he also knew that, someday, he would return to her. With nowhere else to go, he appeared at the home of his childhood friend, Oscar Madison. Sometime earlier, Madison's wife had thrown him out, requesting that he never return. Can two divorced men share an apartment, without driving each other crazy? (Note: In the second and third seasons, "childhood friend" was changed to simply "friend", and "sometime earlier" was changed to "several years earlier".)

The narration was featured in the series' opening credits from the sixteenth episode of the first season until the end of the third season. ABC allegedly added the narration because it did not want the audience to speculate about a homosexual subtext, given the changing perceptions of masculinity at the time. ABC insisted that every episode mention that the characters were both divorced. While the narration noted that Oscar had been thrown out of his home like Felix, several subsequent flashback episodes show that Oscar had lived in his current apartment before and during his marriage (as in the original play and film).

Additionally, while the opening narration states that Felix and Oscar were "childhood friends", the fourth episode of the series, "The Jury Story", shows the two meeting during jury duty. However, in an episode from the fifth season, titled "Our Fathers", Oscar remembers briefly meeting Felix when they were children, while their families were staying in the same hotel in Chicago, Illinois. Such inconsistencies in continuity were common for the show.

In later seasons, the opening sequence features highlights from past episodes, mixed with the previous footage, as well as another clip (recreated from a scene on the show) in which Felix reprimands Oscar for drying his hands on the curtains, only for Oscar to use Felix's shirt as a towel.

For the first three seasons, the closing credits consist of more of the duo's antics, such as Felix talking to a man repairing a street clock, and Oscar indiscreetly looking at a peep show. During the fourth season, the credits include a scene in which Oscar throws his cigar into a fountain in Columbus Circle, Felix barks at him to pick it up, and Oscar scoops it up with his shoe, and places the wet, soiled cigar butt in Felix's pocket. For the final season, the credits are shown against a blue background.

== Related appearances by Klugman and Randall ==
Over the years, Klugman and Randall appeared as Oscar and Felix in many television commercials and public service announcements for several different products, including 1972 ads for Yoplait yogurt (Klugman also appeared in commercials for the product without Randall in the early 1980s); in 1974, for the game Challenge Yahtzee; for a while, their likenesses also appeared on the game's packaging, with the slogan, "You play your way — I'll play mine!"; in the late 1980s and early 1990s, Klugman and Randall reprised their Odd Couple characters in a series of commercials for Eagle Snacks, although in some of these spots, they called each other by their real names.

Klugman and Randall also reprised their roles as Felix and Oscar in several regional productions of the original Neil Simon play. They toured in the play during the TV version's summertime off-season in the early to mid-1970s; they also appeared in several performances of the play during the late 1980s and early 1990s. In 1997, they appeared in a Broadway revival of the Simon play The Sunshine Boys.

In the early 1980s, while starring in the NBC drama Quincy, M.E., Klugman appeared in TV commercials for Canon copiers. Minolta countered by hiring Randall, who was appearing on the NBC sitcom Love, Sidney, to do a commercial for that company's copiers, in which he channeled his Felix Unger, mentioning that he "can change copy colors without getting that disgusting black powder all over my hands!". He closed by saying, "But that doesn't mean I'm a neat freak. Of course, I'm not a slob, either, like, uh...", and waved his hand, to suggest Klugman as Oscar.

Randall and Klugman reunited for the 1993 television movie, The Odd Couple Together Again, to a mixed reception. Klugman had lost a vocal cord to throat cancer, and his real-life struggle was written into the script. In the film, Felix tries to help Oscar recover following surgery; he also becomes overly involved in his daughter Edna's upcoming wedding, much to her and Gloria's (Barbara Barrie) dismay.

== Other versions ==
An ABC cartoon version of The Odd Couple premiered September 6, 1975, titled The Oddball Couple, during the network's Saturday morning kids' programming block, Funshine Saturday. Although authorized by Neil Simon (who received a "based on" credit), completely different characters were created: "Spiffy" (a fussy cat, voiced by Frank Nelson) and "Fleabag" (a sloppy dog, voiced by Paul Winchell), who live together in a house that is half rundown and messy and half pristine and tidy, along with a matching car. It was directed and produced by David DePatie and Friz Freleng, with Gerry Chiniquy and Robert McKimson, among others, who directed several episodes. The characters' professions in this version are reversed from the original series, with the fastidious Spiffy working as a reporter, and the rumpled Fleabag a photographer, often working together. The cartoon was canceled in 1977.

In 1982, as a hedge against the 1981 Writers Guild of America strike, ABC aired an African-American version of The Odd Couple, starring Ron Glass as Felix and Demond Wilson as Oscar. It was called The New Odd Couple, and initially used eight previously filmed scripts from the original series; when the strike ended during the series' production, union writers returned, and original episodes were written. It was canceled after 18 episodes.

A Chilean version, titled Una Pareja Dispareja, began airing in January 2009 on TVN (which had aired the series during the 1970s). This version takes several of its cues from Two and a Half Men, a Chuck Lorre–created sitcom with a premise similar to The Odd Couple (even alluding to the similarities between the two in the episode, "Whipped Unto the Third Generation"). Some of the details taken from Two and a Half Men include Felix and Oscar being siblings instead of friends, as well as Felix being a doctor and Oscar a periodontist.

Another American remake, also called The Odd Couple, aired on CBS for three seasons, from 2015 to 2017. This version, a multi-camera sitcom, was co-created and co-produced by Matthew Perry, who played Oscar, while Thomas Lennon played Felix.

== Episodes ==
Season	Episodes	Originally released		
Season	Episodes	First released	Last released	Network
1	24	September 24, 1970	March 26, 1971	ABC
2	23	September 17, 1971	March 3, 1972	ABC
3	23	September 15, 1972	March 23, 1973	ABC
4	22	September 14, 1973	March 22, 1974	ABC
5	22	September 12, 1974	March 7, 1975	ABC
TV movie		September 24, 1993		CBS

== Home media ==
"The Complete First Season" of The Odd Couple was released on DVD in Region 1 August 18, 2006, by Time Life Video, under license from Paramount Home Entertainment (Paramount Television was the program's original distributor). Some episodes, mainly from the first season, were available on VHS during the 1990s, and distributed by Columbia House.

Each episode on the first season's DVDs contains an introduction from the show's producer, Garry Marshall. Also included as extras are Emmy Awards speeches, bloopers, TV interviews with the show's stars, and a clip of The Odd Couple on Broadway.

Paramount/CBS DVD released the remaining seasons (two through five) of The Odd Couple on DVD in Region 1. Season 1 was released in Region 2 April 28, 2008. All five seasons have been released in Region 2, in Germany, under the title Männerwirtschaft; they contain the option of the original English language soundtrack or a dubbed German version.

While the Time Life Season 1 DVD release contained the original, unedited episodes as originally broadcast, CBS Home Entertainment opted to edit their DVDs of Seasons Two through Five, removing short segments or occasionally entire scenes that include music sung by Felix or some other characters. A notable example of this is seen in the Season 5 episode, "Strike Up the Band... or Else"; in the epilogue, guest star Pernell Roberts's character is going to sing, but the episode abruptly ends. Fans and critics alike lambasted CBS/Paramount for the shoddy treatment that The Odd Couple DVD releases received, concluding that the studio has misled consumers by labeling their DVD sets as "complete", although they have been intentionally edited to avoid paying royalties required by the music publishers.

On June 16, 2015, CBS DVD released The Odd Couple — The Complete Series on DVD in Region 1, albeit with the same edits and removal of scenes with music.

In Australia (Region 4), Paramount released the first season in 2008, but no further releases were made. In 2016, Via Vision Entertainment obtained the rights to release the entire series from July 2016 through September 2016, followed by a Complete Series box set in November 2016.

In September 2023, it was announced that the complete series would be made available for the first time on Blu-ray from Paramount. The set was released December 5, 2023, again with the same musical edits and deletions seen on the DVDs.

Title	Ep #	Release dates		
Title	Ep #	Region 1	Region 2	Region 4
The First Season	24	April 24, 2007	April 28, 2008	April 10, 2008; July 6, 2016 (Re-Release)
The Second Season	23	August 28, 2007	TBA	July 6, 2016
The Third Season	23	January 22, 2008	TBA	July 6, 2016
The Fourth Season	22	June 10, 2008	TBA	August 3, 2016
The Fifth and Final Season	22	November 18, 2008	TBA	September 7, 2016
The Complete Series	114	June 16, 2015	TBA	November 2, 2016
The Complete Series (Blu-ray)	114	December 5, 2023	TBA	TBA
