= Richard Fredricks =

American opera singer (born 1933)

Richard Fredricks (born August 15, 1933, Los Angeles, California) is an American opera singer, and was one of the leading dramatic baritones of both the New York City Opera and the Metropolitan Opera. He has also appeared on network television, performing a number of times on NBC's The Tonight Show and guest-starred in a 1971 episode of ABC's The Odd Couple.

== New York City Opera ==
Fredricks debuted with the New York City Opera on October 1, 1960 as Schaunard in La bohème, with Chester Ludgin and Norman Treigle in the cast. He went on to perform leading baritone roles in The Consul (with Patricia Neway), Le nozze di Figaro (as Count Almaviva), The Ballad of Baby Doe (as Horace Tabor), Lizzie Borden (as Captain Jason MacFarlane, in the world premiere of Beeson's opera), Carmen (as Escamillo), Tosca (as Baron Scarpia, with Plácido Domingo), Cavalleria rusticana (as Alfio), Manon (as Lescaut, with Beverly Sills, conducted by Julius Rudel), Gianni Schicchi (title role), La traviata (as Germont), Lucia di Lammermoor (as Enrico), L'heure espagnole (as Mulateer), Roberto Devereux (as Nottingham), La cenerentola (Dandini), Il barbiere di Siviglia (as Figaro), Un ballo in maschera (as Renato), Maria Stuarda (as Talbot), Rigoletto (title role), Don Giovanni (title role, directed by Frank Corsaro), I puritani (as Sir Richard Forth), Manon Lescaut (as Lescaut), Pagliacci (as Tonio), Lucrezia Borgia (as Alfonzo d'Este), Andrea Chénier (as Gerard), Falstaff (as Ford) and Attila (as Ezio).

== Metropolitan Opera ==
Fredricks made his first appearance with the Met in 1976 at Wolf Trap National Park as Don Carlo in John Dexter's production of La forza del destino. The following year, he was seen at the Metropolitan Opera House in La traviata with Rita Shane. His in-house debut was as Athanael in Thaïs (with Sills), followed by Don Giovanni in Don Giovanni, Barnaba in La gioconda, the Four Villains in Les contes d'Hoffmann, Escamillio in Carmen, Sharpless in Madama Butterfly and Ostasio in Francesca da Rimini with Renata Scotto.

Fredricks appeared at most of the major theatres in the Americas, as well as in Hamburg, Frankfurt, Venice, Israel, Brussels and Mexico. In Canada, he sang the part of the Count de Luna in Il trovatore (Montreal), Rigoletto (Toronto and Quebec City), Scarpia in Tosca (Winnipeg) and as Demetrius in A Midsummer Night's Dream (Vancouver). His recordings include contributions to The Treasury of Great Operettas, The Tender Land, Lizzie Borden and Duruflé's Requiem. He directed La bohème with both the Michigan Opera and the Duluth Opera, as well as singing Lescaut and directing the production of Manon with the Honolulu Opera.

He appeared as himself in the November 5, 1971 episode titled, "Does Your Mother Know You're Out, Rigoletto", of The Odd Couple in which he sang selections from La traviata and Camelot ("If Ever I Would Leave You").

== Videography ==
- Beeson: Lizzie Borden (B.Lewis, Faull, Elgar; Coppola, NN, 1965) VAI
- Donizetti: Roberto Devereux (Sills, Marsee, J.Alexander; Rudel, Capobianco, 1975) [live] VAI
- Verdi: La traviata (Sills, H.Price; Rudel, Capobianco, 1976) [live] VAI
- Massenet: Manon (Sills, H.Price, Ramey; Rudel, Capobianco, 1977) [live] Paramount Pictures
- Zandonai: Francesca da Rimini (Scotto, Rom, Domingo, MacNeil; Levine, Faggioni, 1984) [live] Deutsche Grammophon
