= Jack Klugman =

American actor (1922–2012)

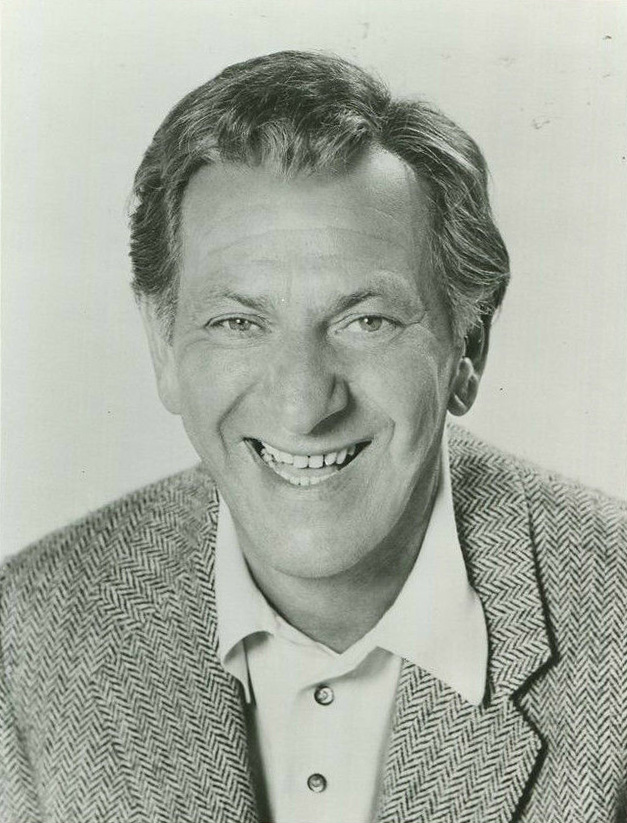
- Klugman in 1972
- Born: April 27, 1922; Philadelphia, Pennsylvania, U.S.
- Died: December 24, 2012 (aged 90); Los Angeles, California, U.S.
- Resting place: Pierce Brothers Westwood Village Memorial Park and Mortuary in Los Angeles
- Education: Carnegie Mellon University
- Occupations: Actor; comedian; director; screenwriter
- Years active: 1949–2012
- Spouses: Brett Somers (m. 1953; div. 1977); Peggy Crosby (m. 2008)
- Children: 2, including Adam
- Relatives: Brian Klugman (grand-nephew)
- Awards: Emmy Award (1964, 1971, 1973); Golden Globe Award (1974)
- Military career
- Allegiance: United States
- Branch: United States Army
- Rank: Technician fifth grade
- Conflicts: World War II

Jack Klugman (April 27, 1922 – December 24, 2012) was an American actor of stage, film and television.

Klugman began his career in 1949 and started television and film work with roles in 12 Angry Men (1957) and Cry Terror! (1958). During the 1960s, he guest-starred on numerous television series. Klugman won his first Primetime Emmy Award for his guest-starring role on The Defenders in 1964. He also made a total of four appearances on The Twilight Zone from 1960 to 1963. In 1965, Klugman replaced Walter Matthau as Oscar Madison in the Broadway play The Odd Couple. Five years later, he reprised that role in the television adaptation of The Odd Couple opposite Tony Randall. The series aired from 1970 to 1975. Klugman won his second and third Primetime Emmy Awards and a Golden Globe Award for his work on the series. From 1976 to 1983, he starred in the title role in Quincy, M.E., for which he earned four Primetime Emmy Award nominations.

== Early life and education ==
Klugman was born in Philadelphia, Pennsylvania on April 27, 1922, the youngest of six children of Russian-Jewish immigrants Rochel “Rose” (née Chaikin), a milliner, and Mendel “Max” Klugman, a house painter. Klugman served in the United States Army during World War II.

He attended Carnegie Institute of Technology, later Carnegie Mellon University, in Pittsburgh. While there, his drama teacher told him, "Young man, you are not suited to be an actor. You are suited to be a truck driver." After the war, he pursued acting roles in New York City while sharing an apartment with friend and fellow actor Charles Bronson.

== Career ==
=== Late 1940s, 1950s, and 1960s ===
Klugman was active in numerous stage, television, and film productions during this period. In early 1949 he took an unpaid role in an Equity Library Theatre production of the mid-1930s play Stevedore, in which Rod Steiger and Ossie Davis also appeared. In 1950, he had a small role in the Mr. Roberts road company production at the Colonial Theatre in Boston. Later that same year, he made his television debut in an episode of Actors Studio. In March 1952, Klugman made his Broadway debut in Golden Boy as Frank Bonaparte.

In 1954, he played Jim Hanson on the soap opera The Greatest Gift. The following year, he appeared in the live television broadcast of Producers' Showcase in the episode "The Petrified Forest" with Humphrey Bogart and Henry Fonda. Klugman later said the experience was the greatest thrill of his career. He went on to appear in several classic films, including as juror number five in 12 Angry Men (1957), of which he was the last surviving cast member. In 1959, he returned to Broadway in the original production of Gypsy: A Musical Fable. In 1960, Klugman was nominated for a Tony Award for Best Featured Actor (Musical) for his role in the show but lost to Tom Bosley in Fiorello!. He remained with Gypsy until it closed in March 1961.

From 1960 to 1963, Klugman appeared in four episodes of The Twilight Zone series: "A Passage for Trumpet" (1960), "A Game of Pool" (1961), "Death Ship" (1963), and "In Praise of Pip" (1963), tying Burgess Meredith for the most appearances in a starring role on the series. In 1964, he won his first Primetime Emmy Award for his guest-starring role on The Defenders. The same year, Klugman was cast in the starring role in the situation comedy Harris Against the World. The series was a part of an experimental block of sitcoms that aired on NBC entitled 90 Bristol Court. Harris Against the World, along with the other sitcoms that aired in the block, were cancelled the following year due to low ratings.

Klugman continued the decade with multiple guest roles on television, including appearances on The F.B.I., Ben Casey, The Name of the Game, The Fugitive, and Insight. He also appeared on Broadway in Tchin-Tchin from October 1962 to May 1963. From 1960 to 1963, Klugman appeared in two episodes of the series The Untouchables: "Loophole" (1961) and "An Eye for an Eye" (1963).

=== The Odd Couple ===
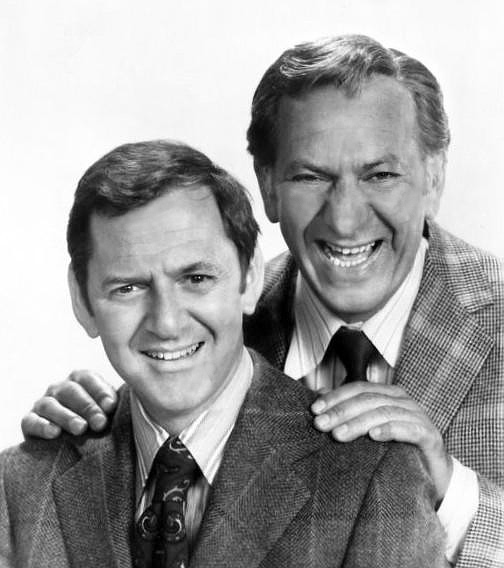
Tony Randall and Klugman in a publicity photo for The Odd Couple, 1972

In 1965, Klugman replaced Walter Matthau in the lead role of Oscar Madison in the original Broadway production of The Odd Couple. He reprised the role when the play was adapted as a television series, which was broadcast on ABC from 1970 to 1975. Over the course of the show's five-year, 114-episode run, Klugman won two Primetime Emmy Awards for his work on the series. In 1973, during the run of the series, Klugman and Odd Couple co-star Randall recorded an album titled The Odd Couple Sings for London Records. Roland Shaw and The London Festival Orchestra and Chorus provided the music and additional vocals.

=== 1970s and 1980s ===
After the cancellation of The Odd Couple in 1975, Klugman returned to television in 1976 in Quincy, M.E., initially broadcast as part of the NBC Mystery Movie umbrella series, before becoming a weekly program. Klugman portrayed Dr. Quincy, a forensic pathologist who worked for the Los Angeles County Coroner's Office and solved crimes. He was nominated for four Primetime Emmy Awards for his work on the series and also wrote four episodes. A total of 148 episodes of Quincy aired over eight seasons, ending in 1983. In 1984, Klugman starred in Lyndon, a one-man show based on Prideaux's script, inspired in part by Merle Miller's taped conversations and directed by George Schaefer. In 1986, Klugman starred in the sitcom You Again? co-starring John Stamos as Klugman's character's son. The series was broadcast on NBC for two seasons before being cancelled. During the show's run, Klugman also appeared on Broadway in I'm Not Rappaport. The show closed in 1988. The following year, he co-starred in the television miniseries Around the World in 80 Days.

=== 1990s to 2010s ===
In 1989, Klugman's throat cancer (with which he was first diagnosed in 1974) returned. His illness sidelined his career for the next four years. He returned to acting in a 1993 Broadway revival of Three Men on a Horse, with Tony Randall. That same year, he again reunited with Tony Randall in the television film The Odd Couple: Together Again. The next year, Klugman co-starred in the television film Parallel Lives.

In 1993, he appeared on a special "celebrity versus regulars" version of the British quiz show Going for Gold, emerging as the series winner.

In 1996, he co-starred in The Twilight of the Golds and the comedy film Dear God. He resumed his television career with guest appearances on Diagnosis: Murder. He also starred in The Outer Limits episode "Glitch" and appeared in an episode of the TV series Crossing Jordan. Klugman starred in both the 1997 Broadway revival and the 2007 off-Broadway revival of The Sunshine Boys.

In 2005, Klugman co-starred in the comedy film When Do We Eat?. That same year, he published Tony and Me: A Story of Friendship, a book about his long friendship with his The Odd Couple co-star Tony Randall. Klugman gave the eulogy at Randall's memorial service in 2004. A fan of the New York Mets (whose cap he wore as Oscar Madison), Klugman started an MLB.com PRO Blog called Klugman's Korner to talk about baseball and Randall.

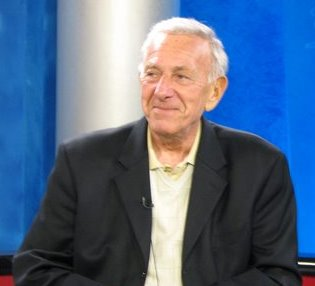
Klugman in August 2005

In 2008, he sued NBC Television over missing profits from his show Quincy M.E. The lawsuit was filed in California state court, with Klugman requesting NBC to show him the original contract. Klugman argued that his production company, Sweater Productions, should have received 25% of the show's net profits. NBC Universal and Klugman settled the lawsuit on undisclosed terms in August 2010.

His last on-screen role was in the 2010 horror film Camera Obscura. Klugman was originally supposed to play Juror #9 in a stage production of Twelve Angry Men at the George Street Playhouse that was set to open on March 13, 2012. However, he had to withdraw from the production because of illness.

== Personal life ==
=== Marriage and children ===
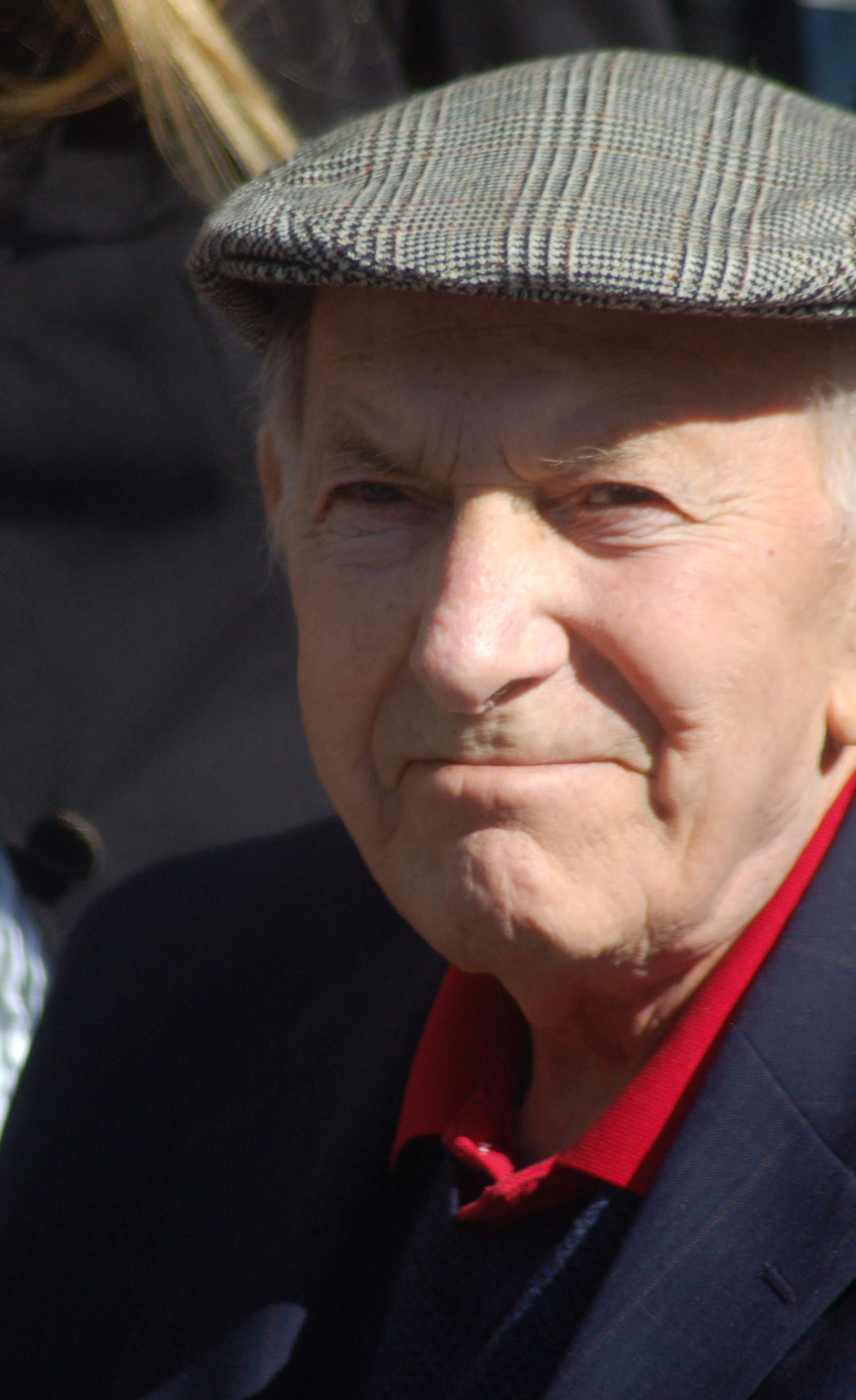
Klugman in November 2009

Klugman married actress Brett Somers in 1953. The couple had two children, Adam (who had a cameo as Oscar Madison as a child in two flashbacks on The Odd Couple) and David. He had a stepdaughter, Leslie Klein, from Somers's first marriage. (Klein was married to Jim Fyfe, an actor and theater director.) The couple separated in 1974 and divorced in August 1977; they did not make their divorce public. In 2007, Somers died from cancer at age 83. Because Klugman did not remarry until after Somers died (nor did Somers ever remarry), it was erroneously reported that the two had remained married but separated for the rest of Somers's life.

Klugman's 18-year relationship with actress Barbara Neugass ended in 1992 and led to a palimony suit that Neugass ultimately lost.

Klugman began living with Peggy Crosby in 1988. They married in February 2008, shortly after Somers’ death.

=== Business interests ===
Klugman was an avid Thoroughbred racing fan. He owned Jaklin Klugman, who finished third in the 1980 Kentucky Derby behind the great filly Genuine Risk and Grade 1 stakes winner Akinemod. Klugman said Jaklin Klugman's success was the biggest thrill of his life. His farm where he kept up to 100 horses was called El Rancho De Jaklin, named after his horse.

In the 1980s, Klugman licensed his name for use by a popcorn franchise named "Jack's Corn Crib".

=== Health ===
Klugman was diagnosed with throat cancer in 1974. In 1988, he lost a vocal cord to throat cancer surgery but continued to act on stage and television, though he was left with a quiet and rough, raspy voice. In later years subsequent to his operation, he regained limited strength in his voice. This real-life health issue was central to the plot of the 1993 Odd Couple reunion TV movie.

== Death ==
Klugman died from prostate cancer at his home in Woodland Hills, Los Angeles on December 24, 2012, aged 90. A New York Times profile described him as an "extraordinary actor ennobling the ordinary." His obituary in the Huffington Post referred to him as a "character actor titan." Klugman's ashes are interred in a columbarium at Westwood Memorial Park cemetery in Los Angeles.

== Stage credits ==
Date	Production	Role
March 12 – April 6, 1952	Golden Boy	Frank Bonaparte
November 14 – 17, 1956	A Very Special Baby	Carmen
May 21, 1959 – March 25, 1961	Gypsy: A Musical Fable	Herbie
Apr 22, 1963 – May 18, 1963	Tchin-Tchin	Caesario Grimaldi (Replacement)
November 8, 1965 – July 2, 1967	The Odd Couple	Oscar Madison (Replacement)
December 18, 1968 – December 21, 1968	The Sudden & Accidental Re-Education of Horse Johnson	Horse Johnson
February 26, 1984 – March 11, 1984	Lyndon	Lyndon B. Johnson
November 19, 1985 – January 17, 1988	I'm Not Rappaport	Nat Moyer (Replacement)
April 13 – May 16, 1993	Three Men on a Horse	Patsy
December 8, 1997 – June 28, 1998	The Sunshine Boys	Willie Clark

== Filmography ==
Film
Year	Title	Role	Notes
1952	Grubstake		Alternative title: Apache Gold
1956	Time Table	Frankie Page	
1957	12 Angry Men	Juror No. 5	
1958	Cry Terror!	Vince, a thug	
1962	Days of Wine and Roses	Jim Hungerford	
1963	I Could Go On Singing	George	
1963	The Yellow Canary	Lt. Bonner	
1963	Act One	Joe Hyman	
1965	Hail, Mafia	Phil	Alternative title: Je vous salue, mafia!
1968	The Detective	Dave Schoenstein	
1968	The Split	Harry Kifka	
1969	Goodbye, Columbus	Ben Patimkin	
1971	Who Says I Can't Ride a Rainbow!	Barney Morovitz	
1976	Two-Minute Warning	Sandman	
1996	The Twilight of the Golds	Mr. Stein	
1996	Dear God	Jemi	
2005	When Do We Eat?	Artur	

Television
Year	Title	Role	Notes
1950	Suspense	Louie	Episode: "Murder at the Mardi Gras"
1953	Colonel Humphrey Flack		2 episodes
1954	Rocky King Detective		Episode: "Return for Death"
1954	Inner Sanctum	Various roles	3 episodes
1954–1956	Justice		4 episodes
1955	Producers' Showcase	Jackie	Episode: "The Petrified Forest"
1955	Treasury Men in Action		Episode: "The Case of the Betrayed Artist"
1955–1956	Goodyear Television Playhouse		2 episodes
1955–1956	Armstrong Circle Theatre		2 episodes
1957	Alfred Hitchcock Presents	George Benedict	Season 3 Episode 2: "Mail Order Prophet"
1957	General Electric Theater	Peter Tong	Episode: "A New Girl In His Life"
1958	Gunsmoke	Earl Ticks	Episode: "Buffalo Man"
1958	General Electric Theater	Murphy	Episode: "The Young and Scared"
1958	Kiss Me, Kate	Gunman	Television film
1959	The Walter Winchell File	Allie Sunshine	Episode: "Death Comes in a Small Package: File #37"
1959	Naked City	Mike Greco	ABC-TV, S1-Ep 19: "The Shield"
1960	Special for Women: The Cold Woman	The Husband	Television film
1960–1963	The Twilight Zone	Joey Crown, Jesse Cardiff, Captain Ross, Max Phillips	Episode #32: "A Passage for Trumpet"; Episode #70: "A Game of Pool"; Episode #108: "Death Ship"; Episode #121: "In Praise of Pip"
1961	Follow the Sun	Steve Bixel	Episode: "Busman's Holiday"
1961	Target: The Corruptors!	Otto Dutch Kleberg, Greg Paulson	1x02 Pier 60, 1x18 Chase the Dragon
1961	Straightaway	Buddy Conway	Episode: "Die Laughing"
1962	The New Breed	Floyd Blaylock	Episode: "All the Dead Faces"
1962	Cain's Hundred	Mike Colonni	Episode: "Women of Silure"
1962	Naked City	Peter Kannick	Episode: "King Stanislaus and the Knights of the Round Stable"
1963	The Untouchables	Solly Girsch	Episode: "An Eye for An Eye"
1963	Naked City	Arthur Crews	Episode: "Stop the Parade! A Baby Is Crying!"
1963	Arrest and Trial	Celina	Episode: "The Quality of Justice"
1963	The Fugitive	Buck Harmon	Episode: "Terror at High Point", Season 1, Episode 13
1964	The Virginian	Charles Mayhew	Episode: "Roar from the Mountain"
1964	The Defenders	Joe Larch	Episode: "Blacklist"
1964	The Great Adventure	John Brown	Episode: "The Night Raiders"
1964	Insight	Carny	Episode: "The Kid Show"
1964–1965	Harris Against the World	Alan Harris	13 episodes
1965	Kraft Suspense Theatre	Ozzie Keefer	Episode: "Won't It Ever Be Morning? "
1965	Ben Casey	Dr. Bill Justin	Episode: "A Slave Is on the Throne"
1965	The Fugitive	Gus Hendricks	Episode: "Everybody Gets Hit in the Mouth Sometimes", Season 2, Episode 24
1965	Insight	Weiss	Episode: "The Prisoner"
1966	Fame Is the Name of the Game	Ben Welcome	Television film
1967	Garrison's Gorillas	Gus Manners	Episode: "Banker's Hours"
1969	Then Came Bronson	Dr. Charles Hanrahan	Episode: "The Runner"
1970	The Bold Ones: The New Doctors	Leland Rogers	Episode: "The Diamond Millstone"
1970	The Name of the Game	Captain Garrig	Episode: "The Time Is Now"
1970–1975	The Odd Couple	Oscar Madison	114 episodes
1972	Banyon		Episode: "The Lady Killers"
1973	Poor Devil	Burnett J. Emerson	Television film
1974	The Underground Man	Sheriff Tremaine	Television film
1976	One of My Wives Is Missing	Inspector Murray Levine	Television film
1976–1983	Quincy, M.E.	Dr. R. Quincy, M.E.	147 episodes
1979	Password Plus	Himself	Game Show Participant / Celebrity Guest Star
1979	Insight	Packy Rowe	Episode: "Rebirth of Packy Rowe"
1986–1987	You Again?	Henry Willows	26 episodes
1989	Around the World in 80 Days	Capt. Bunsby	Miniseries
1993	The Odd Couple Together Again	Oscar Madison	Television film
1994	Parallel Lives	Senator Robert Ferguson	Television film
1995	Shining Time Station: Second Chances	Max Okowsky	Television film
1997	Diagnosis: Murder	Dr. Jeff Everden	Episode: "Physician, Murder Thyself"
1999	Diagnosis: Murder	Lt. Harry Trumble	Episode: "Voices Carry"
1999	Brother's Keeper	Jack	Episode: "An Odd Couple of Days"
2000	The Outer Limits	Joe Walker	Episode: "Glitch"
2000	Third Watch	Stan Brandolini	Episode: "Run of the Mill"
2002	Crossing Jordan	Dr. Leo Gelber	Episode: "Someone to Count On"

== Awards and nominations ==
Year	Award	Category	Nominated work	Result	Ref.
1969	British Academy Film Awards	Best Actor in a Supporting Role	Goodbye, Columbus	Nominated	
1971	Golden Globe Awards	Best Actor in a Television Series – Musical or Comedy	The Odd Couple	Nominated	
1973	Golden Globe Awards	Best Actor in a Television Series – Musical or Comedy	The Odd Couple	Won	
1964	Primetime Emmy Awards	Outstanding Single Performance by an Actor in a Leading Role	The Defenders	Won	
1971	Primetime Emmy Awards	Outstanding Continued Performance by an Actor in a Leading Role in a Comedy Series	The Odd Couple	Won	
1972	Primetime Emmy Awards	Outstanding Continued Performance by an Actor in a Leading Role in a Comedy Series	The Odd Couple	Nominated	
1973	Primetime Emmy Awards	Outstanding Continued Performance by an Actor in a Leading Role in a Comedy Series	The Odd Couple	Won	
1974	Primetime Emmy Awards	Best Lead Actor in a Comedy Series	The Odd Couple	Nominated	
1975	Primetime Emmy Awards	Outstanding Lead Actor in a Comedy Series	The Odd Couple	Nominated	
1977	Primetime Emmy Awards	Outstanding Lead Actor in a Drama Series	Quincy, M.E.	Nominated	
1978	Primetime Emmy Awards	Outstanding Lead Actor in a Drama Series	Quincy, M.E.	Nominated	
1979	Primetime Emmy Awards	Outstanding Lead Actor in a Drama Series	Quincy, M.E.	Nominated	
1980	Primetime Emmy Awards	Outstanding Lead Actor in a Drama Series	Quincy, M.E.	Nominated	
1960	Tony Awards	Best Supporting or Featured Actor in a Musical	Gypsy	Nominated	
2004	TV Land Awards	Quintessential Non-Traditional Family	The Odd Couple (Shared with Tony Randall)	Won	

For his contributions to television, Klugman was awarded a star on the Hollywood Walk of Fame. His star is located at 6555 Hollywood Boulevard.
