= Jack Nicholson filmography =

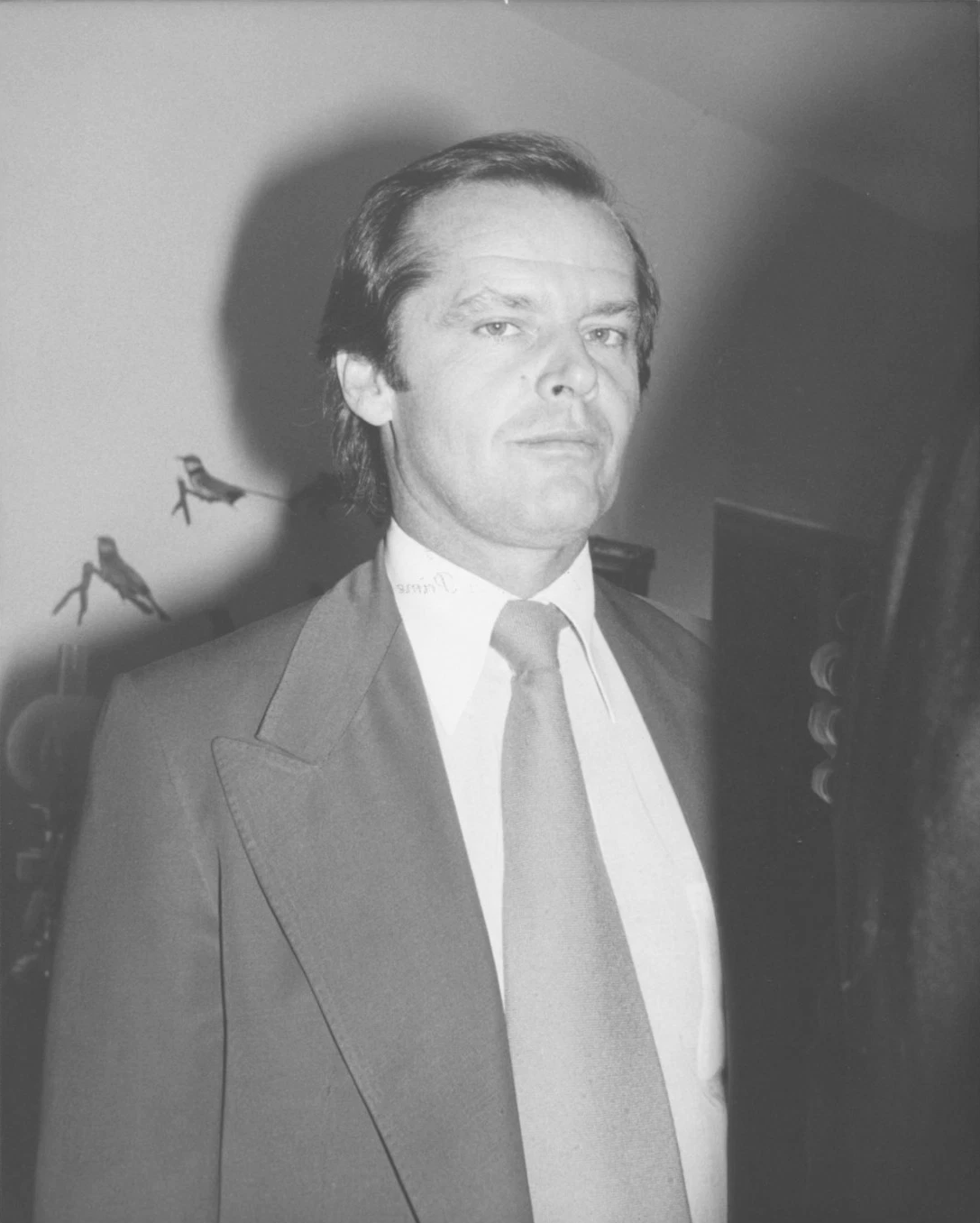
Nicholson, c. 1970s

Jack Nicholson is a retired American actor, director, producer, and screenwriter who made his film debut in The Cry Baby Killer (1958). Nicholson is widely regarded as one of the greatest actors of his generation. He is also one of the most critically acclaimed: his 12 Academy Award nominations make him the most nominated male actor in the Academy's history. He is also a Kennedy Center Honoree and a recipient of the AFI Life Achievement Award and the Golden Globe Cecil B. DeMille Award.

In the first decade of his acting career, Nicholson had several minor roles in film and television, only having significant parts in independent films. Nicholson's breakout role was in the countercultural Easy Rider (1969). Nicholson next appeared in Five Easy Pieces (1970). He then starred in the comedy-drama Carnal Knowledge (1971). His performance in The Last Detail (1973) garnered him the Cannes Best Actor Award. For his performance in the Roman Polanski-directed Chinatown (1974), he was awarded the Golden Globe Award for Best Actor – Motion Picture Drama. He then portrayed Randle McMurphy in the Miloš Forman-directed One Flew Over the Cuckoo's Nest (1975), which won Best Picture and garnered him the Academy Award for Best Actor and Golden Globe Award for Best Actor – Motion Picture Drama. In 1976, he starred in the film adaptation of F. Scott Fitzgerald's The Last Tycoon (1941). Also that year, Nicholson costarred with Marlon Brando in the western The Missouri Breaks. In 1978, Nicholson directed and starred in another western, Goin' South.

In 1980, Nicholson played Jack Torrance in Stanley Kubrick's The Shining. For his portrayal of playwright Eugene O'Neill in Reds (1981), Nicholson was awarded the BAFTA Award for Best Actor in a Supporting Role. He won the Academy Award for Best Supporting Actor and Golden Globe Award for Best Supporting Actor – Motion Picture for his acting in Terms of Endearment (1983). He later returned in the 1996 sequel The Evening Star. He collaborated with director John Huston in Prizzi's Honor (1985), for which Nicholson earned another Best Actor nomination from the Academy. His role as Francis Phelan in Ironweed (1987) garnered him yet another Oscar nomination for Best Actor. He then portrayed the Joker in the Tim Burton-directed Batman (1989). Nicholson subsequently directed and acted in The Two Jakes (1990), a sequel to Chinatown. In 1992, he portrayed Jimmy Hoffa in the Danny DeVito-directed Hoffa. That year Nicholson also appeared in the Rob Reiner-directed A Few Good Men. He collaborated with Burton again on Mars Attacks! (1996). His next role in As Good as It Gets (1997) garnered him the Academy Award for Best Actor and the Golden Globe Award for Best Actor in a Motion Picture – Musical or Comedy. In 2006, he starred alongside Matt Damon and Leonardo DiCaprio in the Martin Scorsese-directed The Departed. He starred opposite Morgan Freeman in the 2007 comedy The Bucket List. His final film appearance was in How Do You Know (2010).

== Film ==
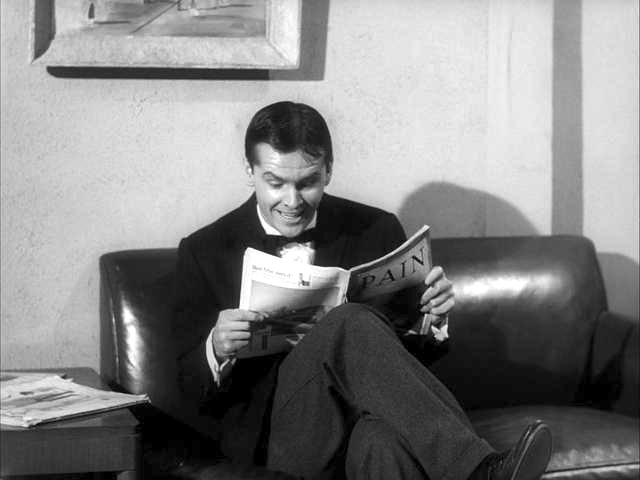
Nicholson in The Little Shop of Horrors (1960)

Nicholson with Boris Karloff in The Terror (1963)

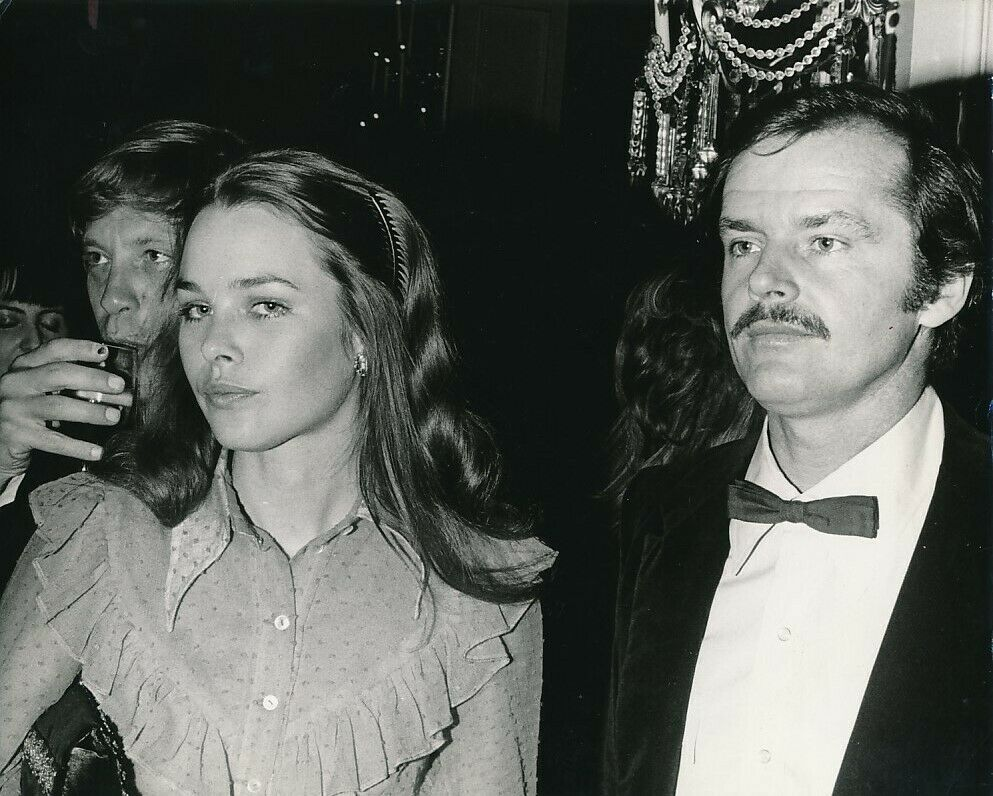
Nicholson with Michelle Phillips at the 1971 Golden Globes

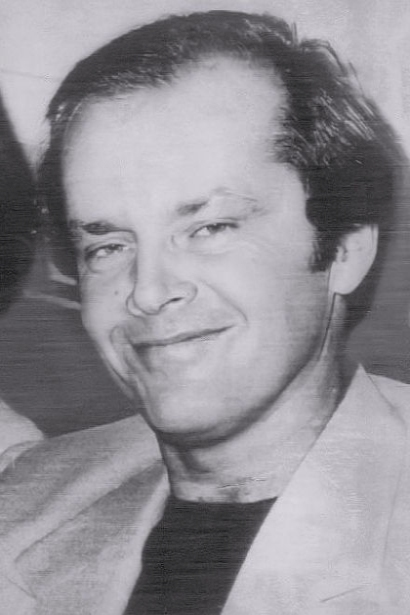
Nicholson after receiving a 1976 Oscar nomination for his performance in One Flew Over the Cuckoo's Nest (1975)

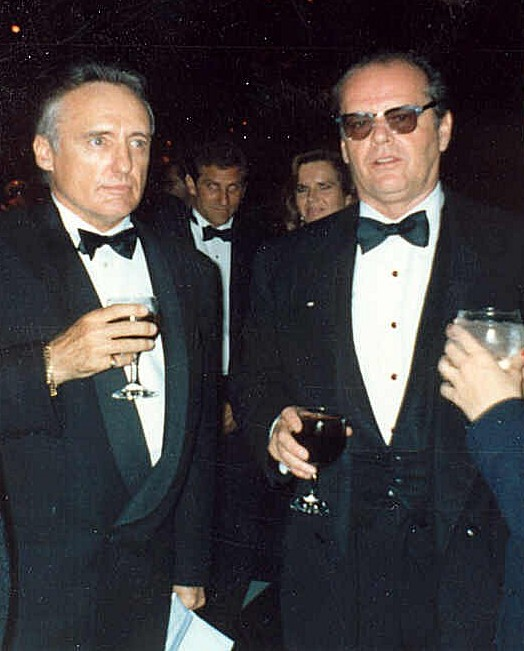
Nicholson with Easy Rider (1969) co-star Dennis Hopper at the 62nd Academy Awards in 1990

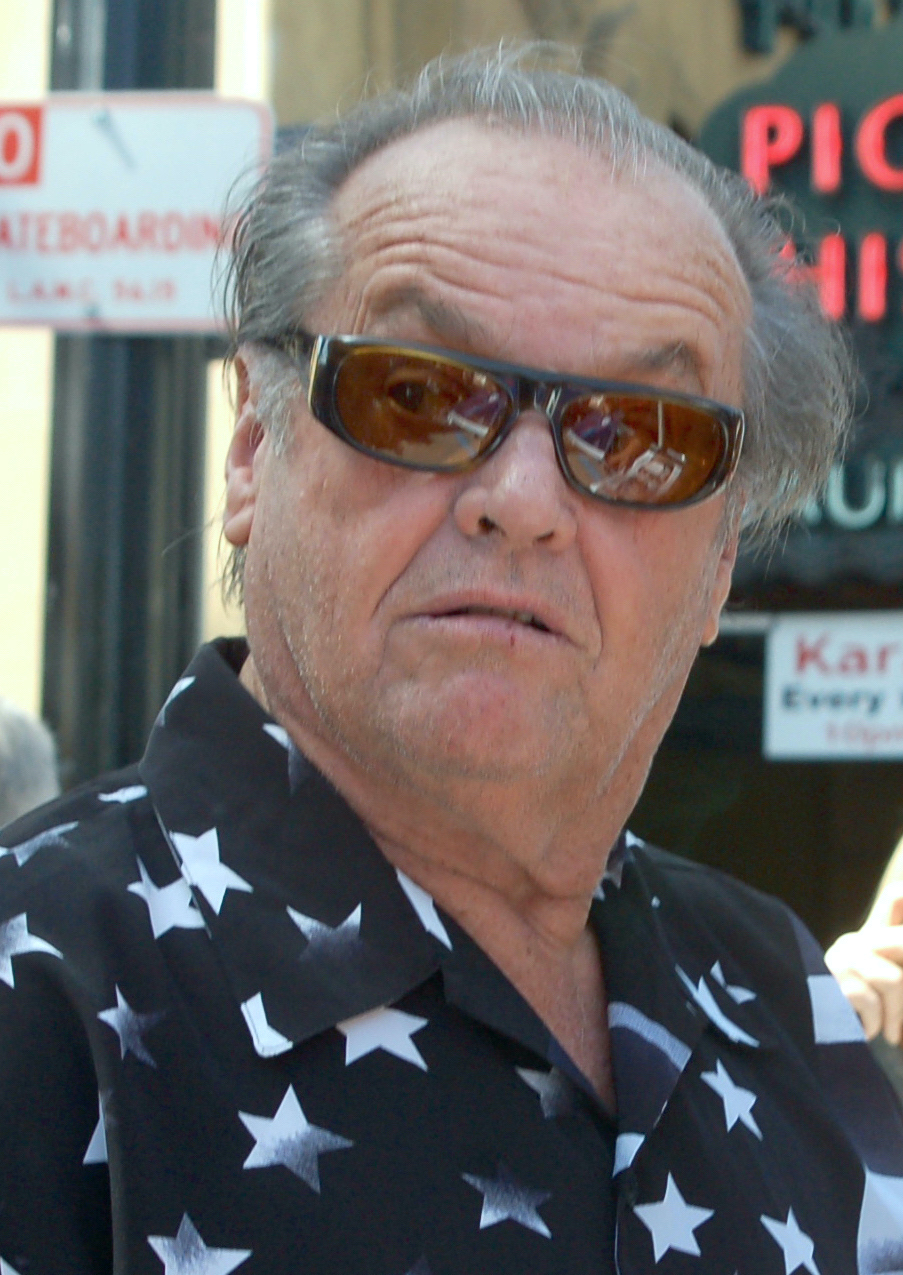
Nicholson at the Hollywood Walk of Fame in 2010

Table containing films with Jack Nicholson
Year	Title	Role	Notes	Ref.
1958	The Cry Baby Killer	Jimmy Wallace		
1960	Too Soon to Love	Buddy		
1960	The Wild Ride	Johnny Varron		
1960	The Little Shop of Horrors	Wilbur Force		
1960	Studs Lonigan	Weary Reilly		
1962	The Broken Land	Will Brocious		
1963	The Raven	Rexford Bedlo		
1963	The Terror	Andre Duvalier		
1963	Thunder Island	—	Writer only	
1964	Flight to Fury	Jay Wickham	Also writer	
1964	Back Door to Hell	Burnett		
1964	Ensign Pulver	Dolan		
1966	The Shooting	Billy Spear	Also producer	
1966	Ride in the Whirlwind	Wes	Also writer and producer	
1967	The St. Valentine's Day Massacre	Gino	Uncredited	
1967	Hells Angels on Wheels	Poet		
1967	The Trip	—	Writer only	
1968	Psych-Out	Stoney		
1968	Head	Movie Director in Restaurant	Uncredited cameo; Also writer and producer	
1969	Easy Rider	George Hanson		
1970	On a Clear Day You Can See Forever	Tad Pringle		
1970	The Rebel Rousers	Bunny		
1970	Five Easy Pieces	Robert Eroica Dupea		
1971	Carnal Knowledge	Jonathan Fuerst		
1971	A Safe Place	Mitch		
1971	Drive, He Said	—	Director, writer and producer	
1972	The King of Marvin Gardens	David Staebler		
1973	The Last Detail	Signalman 1st Class Billy L. "Badass" Buddusky		
1974	Chinatown	J. J. "Jake" Gittes		
1975	Tommy	The Specialist		
1975	The Passenger	David Locke		
1975	The Fortune	Oscar Sullivan		
1975	One Flew Over the Cuckoo's Nest	Randle Patrick "Mac" McMurphy		
1976	The Missouri Breaks	Tom Logan		
1976	The Last Tycoon	Brimmer		
1978	Goin' South	Henry Lloyd Moon	Also director	
1980	The Shining	Jack Torrance		
1981	The Postman Always Rings Twice	Frank Chambers		
1981	Reds	Eugene O'Neill		
1982	The Border	Charlie Smith		
1983	Terms of Endearment	Garrett Breedlove		
1985	Prizzi's Honor	Charley Partanna		
1986	Heartburn	Mark Forman		
1987	The Witches of Eastwick	Daryl Van Horne		
1987	Broadcast News	Bill Rorish		
1987	Ironweed	Francis Phelan		
1989	Batman	Jack Napier / The Joker (Note: Napier becomes the Joker.)		
1990	The Two Jakes	J. J. "Jake" Gittes	Also director	
1992	Man Trouble	Harry Bliss		
1992	A Few Good Men	Colonel Nathan R. Jessup		
1992	Hoffa	Jimmy Hoffa		
1994	Wolf	Will Randall		
1995	The Crossing Guard	Freddy Gale		
1996	Blood and Wine	Alex Gates		
1996	Mars Attacks!	President James Dale / Art Land (Note: Nicholson plays two separate characters.)		
1996	The Evening Star	Garrett Breedlove		
1997	As Good as It Gets	Melvin Udall		
2001	The Pledge	Jerry Black		
2002	About Schmidt	Warren R. Schmidt		
2003	Anger Management	Dr. Buddy Rydell		
2003	Something's Gotta Give	Harry Sanborn		
2006	The Departed	Francis "Frank" Costello		
2007	The Bucket List	Edward Perriman Cole		
2010	I'm Still Here	Himself		
2010	How Do You Know	Charles Madison		

== Television ==
Table containing television appearances by Jack Nicholson
Year	Title	Role	Notes	Ref.
1956	NBC Matinee Theater	Musician's Son	Episode: "Are You Listening?"	
1960	Mr. Lucky	Martin	Episode: "Operation Fortuna?"	
1960	The Barbara Stanwyck Show	Bud	Episode: "The Mink Coat"	
1961	Tales of Wells Fargo	Tom Washburn	Episode: "That Washburn Girl"	
1961	Sea Hunt	John Stark	Episode: "Round Up"	
1961	Bronco	Bob Doolin	Episode: "The Equalizer"	
1962	Hawaiian Eye	Tony Morgan	Episode: "Total Eclipse"	
1966	Dr. Kildare	Jaime Angel	4 episodes	
1966–67	The Andy Griffith Show	Marvin Jenkins / Mr. Garland	2 episodes	
1967	The Guns of Will Sonnett	Tom Murdock	Episode: "A Son for a Son"	
1986	The Elephant's Child	Narrator (voice)	Television short	
1988	How the Rhinoceros Got His Skin & How the Camel Got His Hump	Narrator (voice)	Television short	
2015	Saturday Night Live 40th Anniversary Special	Himself	Television special	
2025	Saturday Night Live 50th Anniversary Special	Himself	Television special	

== See also ==
- List of awards and nominations received by Jack Nicholson
