= Jack Nicholson =

American actor and filmmaker (born 1937)

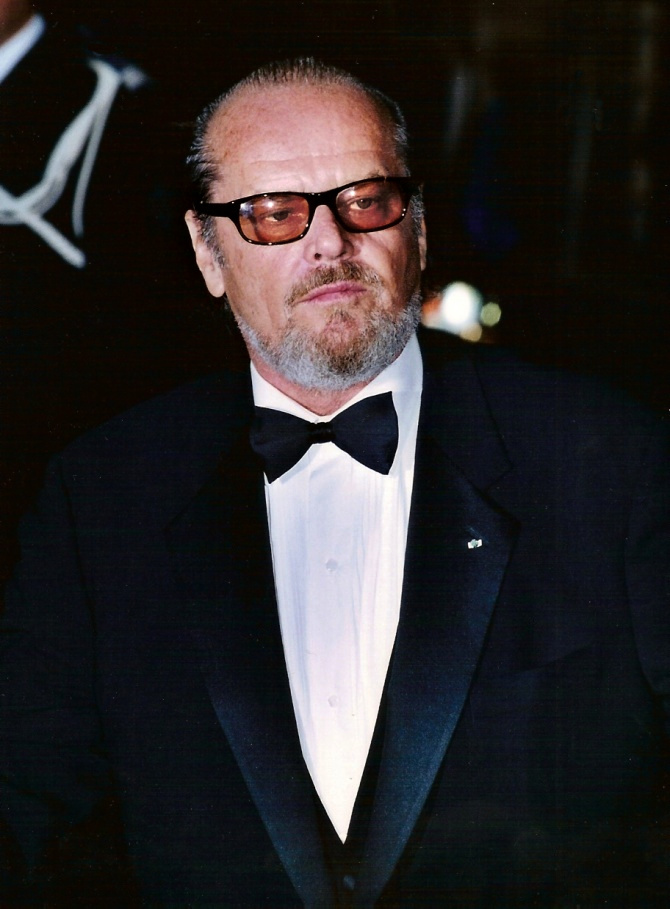
- Nicholson in 2002
- Born: John Joseph Nicholson; April 22, 1937 (age 89); Neptune City, New Jersey, U.S.
- Occupations: Actor; filmmaker
- Years active: 1955–2010
- Works: Filmography
- Spouse: Sandra Knight (m. 1962; div. 1968)
- Partners: Anjelica Huston (1973–1990); Rebecca Broussard (1989–1994); Lara Flynn Boyle (1999–2004)
- Children: 6, including Lorraine and Ray
- Awards: Full list

Signature
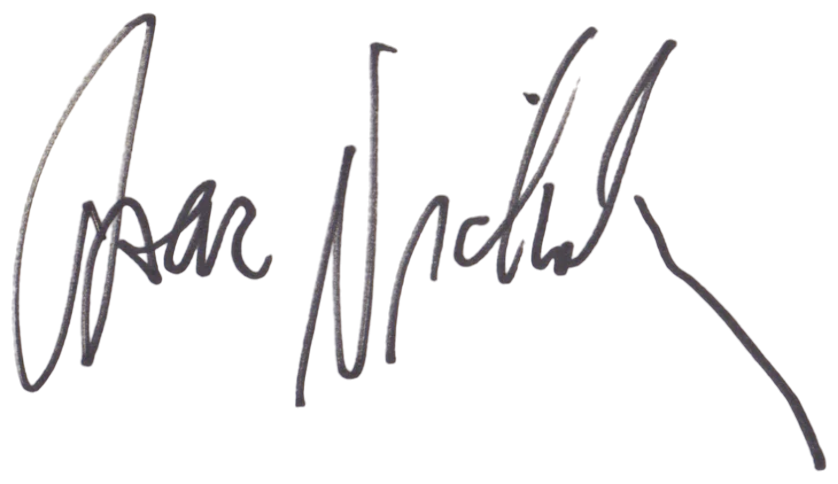

John Joseph Nicholson (born April 22, 1937) is an American retired actor and filmmaker. Nicholson is widely regarded as one of the greatest actors of the 20th century, often playing charismatic rebels fighting against the social structure. Over his five-decade-long career, he received numerous accolades, including three Academy Awards, three BAFTAs, six Golden Globe Awards, and a Grammy Award.

Nicholson won Academy Awards for Best Actor for playing Randle McMurphy in One Flew Over the Cuckoo's Nest (1975) and an author with OCD in As Good as It Gets (1997), as well as for Best Supporting Actor for playing an aging playboy in Terms of Endearment (1983). He received further Oscar nominations for Easy Rider (1969), Five Easy Pieces (1970), The Last Detail (1973), Chinatown (1974), Reds (1981), Prizzi's Honor (1985), Ironweed (1987), A Few Good Men (1992), and About Schmidt (2002).

Nicholson made his film debut in Roger Corman's The Cry Baby Killer (1958). His other notable roles were in Psych-Out (1968), Carnal Knowledge (1971), The King of Marvin Gardens (1972), The Passenger (1975), The Missouri Breaks (1976), The Shining (1980), Broadcast News (1987), Batman (1989), Hoffa (1992), Mars Attacks! (1996), Anger Management, Something's Gotta Give (both 2003), The Departed (2006), and The Bucket List (2007). He also had a cameo in Corman's cult classic The Little Shop of Horrors (1960), which has been heavily promoted on home video releases. As a director, Nicholson has helmed three films: Drive, He Said (1971), Goin' South (1978), and The Two Jakes (1990). Nicholson has also written several films, including The Monkees' vehicle Head (1968). He retired from acting after starring in How Do You Know (2010).

Nicholson is one of four male actors to win three Academy Awards and one of only two actors to be nominated for an Academy Award for acting in films made in every decade from the 1960s to the 2000s (the other is Michael Caine). His 12 Academy Award nominations make him the most nominated male actor in the Academy's history. He was honored with the AFI Life Achievement Award in 1994, the Cecil B. DeMille Award in 1999 and the Kennedy Center Honor in 2001.

== Early life and education ==
John Joseph Nicholson was born on April 22, 1937, in Neptune City, New Jersey, the son of a showgirl, June Frances Nicholson (stage name June Nilson; 1918–1963). Nicholson's mother was of Irish, English, German, and Welsh descent. Nicholson has identified as Irish, comparing himself to the playwright Eugene O'Neill, whom he played in the film Reds (1981): "I'm not saying I'm as dark as he was ... but I am a writer, I am Irish, I have had problems with my family." His mother married Italian-American showman Donald Furcillo (stage name Donald Rose; 1909–1997) in 1936, before realizing that he was already married to actress Shannon O'Connell. Biographer Patrick McGilligan stated in his book Jack's Life that Latvian-born Eddie King (originally Edgar A. Kirschfeld), June's manager, may have been Nicholson's biological father, rather than Furcillo. Other sources suggest June Nicholson was unsure of the father's identity.

As June was only 19 and unmarried, her parents (Note: John Joseph Nicholson (1898–1955, a department store window dresser in Manasquan, New Jersey) and Ethel May (née Rhoads; 1898–1970, a hairdresser, beautician and amateur artist in Manasquan)) agreed to raise Nicholson as their own child without revealing his true parentage, with June acting as his sister. In 1974, Time magazine researchers learned, and informed Nicholson, that his "sister", June, was actually his mother, and his other "sister", Lorraine, was really his aunt. By this time, both his mother and grandmother had died (in 1963 and 1970, respectively). On finding out, Nicholson said it was "a pretty dramatic event, but it wasn't what I'd call traumatizing ... I was pretty well psychologically formed".

Nicholson grew up in Neptune City, New Jersey. Before starting high school, his family moved into an apartment in Spring Lake, New Jersey. "Nick", as he was known to his high school friends, attended nearby Manasquan High School, where he was voted "Class Clown" by the Class of 1954. He was in detention every day for a whole school year. A theatre and a drama award at the school are named in his honor. In 2004, Nicholson attended his 50-year high school reunion accompanied by his aunt Lorraine.

== Military service ==
In 1957, Nicholson joined the California Air National Guard, a move he sometimes characterized as an effort to "dodge the draft"; the Korean War era's Military Selective Service Act was still in force, and draftees were required to perform up to two years of active duty. After completing the Air Force's basic training at Lackland Air Force Base, Nicholson performed weekend drills and two-week annual training as a firefighter assigned to the unit based at the Van Nuys Airport. During the Berlin Crisis of 1961, Nicholson was called up for several months of extended active duty, and he was discharged at the end of his enlistment in 1962.

== Career ==
=== 1958–1969: Early roles and breakthrough ===
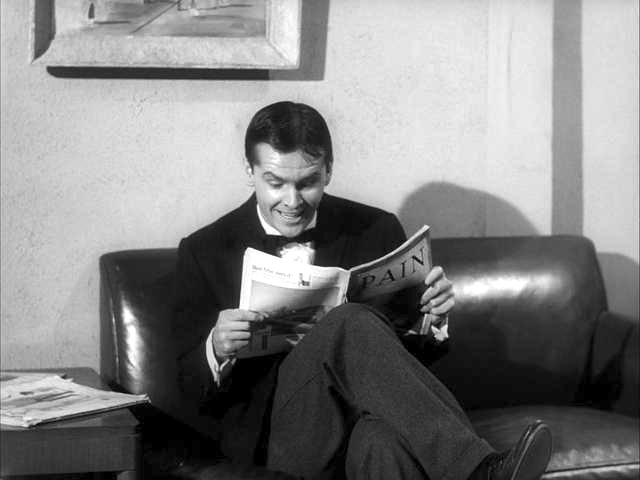
Nicholson as Wilbur Force in The Little Shop of Horrors (1960)

Nicholson first came to California in 1950, when he was 13, to visit his sister. He took a job as an office worker for animation directors William Hanna and Joseph Barbera at the MGM cartoon studio. They offered him an entry-level job as an animator, but he declined, citing his desire to become an actor. While accepting the Cecil B. DeMille Award at the 56th Golden Globe Awards, he recalled that his first day as a working actor (on Tales of Wells Fargo) was May 5, 1955, which he considered lucky, as 5 was the jersey number of his boyhood idol, Joe DiMaggio. He trained to be an actor with a group called the Players Ring Theater, after which he found small parts performing on the stage and in TV soap operas. He made his film debut in a low-budget teen drama The Cry Baby Killer (1958), playing the title role. For the next decade, Nicholson frequently collaborated with the film's producer, Roger Corman. Corman directed Nicholson on several occasions, such as in The Little Shop of Horrors as undertaker (a masochistic dental patient) Wilbur Force; in The Raven; The Terror, where he plays a French officer seduced by an evil ghost; and The St. Valentine's Day Massacre. Nicholson frequently worked with director Monte Hellman on low-budget westerns; two of them—Ride in the Whirlwind and The Shooting—initially failed to interest U.S. film distributors but gained cult success on the French art-house circuit and were later sold to television. Nicholson also appeared in two episodes of The Andy Griffith Show, and starred as a rebellious dirt-track race driver in the 1960 film The Wild Ride.

With his acting career foundering, Nicholson seemed resigned to a career behind the camera as a writer/director. His first real taste of writing success was the screenplay for the 1967 counterculture film The Trip (directed by Corman), starring Peter Fonda and Dennis Hopper. After first reading the script, Fonda told Nicholson he was impressed by the writing and felt it could become a great film. But Fonda was disappointed with how the film turned out and blamed the editing for turning it into a "predictable" film and said so publicly. "I was livid", he recalls. Nicholson also co-wrote, with Bob Rafelson, the movie Head, which starred The Monkees, and arranged the movie's soundtrack.

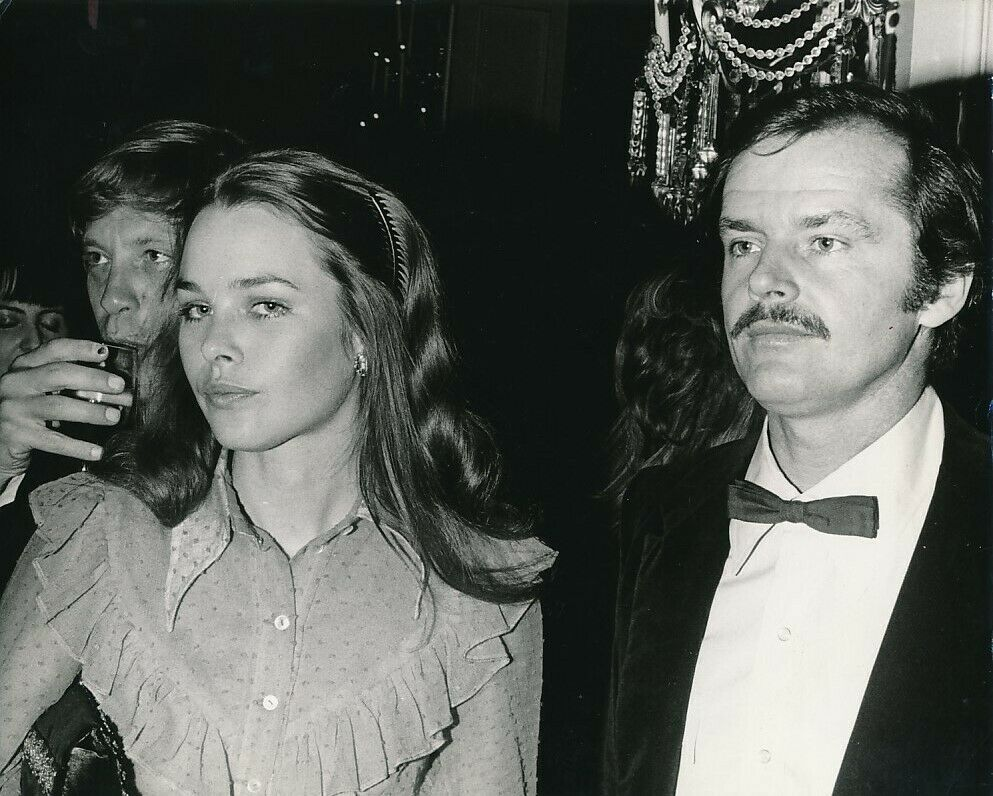
Nicholson with Michelle Phillips at the 1971 Golden Globes

Nicholson's first big acting break came when a role opened up in Fonda and Hopper's Easy Rider (1969). He played alcoholic lawyer George Hanson, for which he received his first Oscar nomination. The film cost only $400,000 to make, and became a blockbuster, grossing $60 million. Biographer John Parker wrote that Nicholson's interpretation of his role placed him in the company of earlier antihero actors, such as James Cagney and Humphrey Bogart, while promoting him into an "overnight number-one hero of the counter-culture movement". The part was a lucky break for Nicholson. The role had been written for Rip Torn, who withdrew from the project after an argument with Hopper. Nicholson later acknowledged the importance of being cast in Easy Rider: "All I could see in the early films, before Easy Rider, was this desperate young actor trying to vault out of the screen and create a movie career". Stanley Kubrick, who was impressed by his performance in Easy Rider, cast Nicholson as Napoleon in a film about his life, and although production on the film commenced, the project fizzled out, partly due to a change in ownership at MGM.

=== 1970–1989: Stardom and acclaim ===
In 1970, Nicholson starred in Five Easy Pieces alongside Karen Black, in what became his persona-defining role. Nicholson and Black were nominated for Academy Awards for their performances. Nicholson played Bobby Dupea, an oil rig worker, and Black played his waitress girlfriend. Black noted that Nicholson's character in the film was very subdued and very different from Nicholson's real personality. She said that the now-classic restaurant scene was partly improvised by Nicholson, and was out of character for Bobby, who would not have cared enough to argue with a waitress. "I think that Jack really has very little in common with Bobby. I think Bobby has given up looking for love. But Jack hasn't, he's very interested in love, in finding out things. Jack is a very curious, alive human being. Always ready for a new idea". Nicholson himself said as much, telling an interviewer: "I like listening to everybody. This to me is the elixir of life".

There is James Cagney, Spencer Tracy, Humphrey Bogart, and Henry Fonda. After that, who is there but Jack Nicholson?

— Mike Nichols, director

Black later admitted that she had a crush on Nicholson from the time they met, although they dated only briefly. "He was very beautiful. He just looked right at you ... I liked him a lot ... He really sort of wanted to date me but I didn't think of him that way because I was going with Peter Kastner ... Then I went to do Easy Rider, but didn't see him because we didn't have any scenes together ... At the premiere, I saw him out in the lobby afterward and I started crying ... He didn't understand that, but what it was was that I really loved him a lot, and I didn't know it until I saw him again, because it all welled up".

Within a month after its release that September, Five Easy Pieces became a blockbuster, making Nicholson a leading man and the "new American anti-hero", according to McDougal. Critics began speculating as to whether he might become another Marlon Brando or James Dean. His career and income skyrocketed. He said: "I have [become] much sought after. Your name becomes a brand image like a product. You become Campbell's soup, with thirty-one different varieties of roles you can play". He told his new agent, Sandy Bresler, to find him unusual roles so he could stretch his acting skill: "I like to play people that haven't existed yet, a 'cusp character'", he said: "I have that creative yearning. Much in the way Chagall flies figures into the air: once it becomes part of the conventional wisdom, it doesn't seem particularly adventurous or weird or wild".

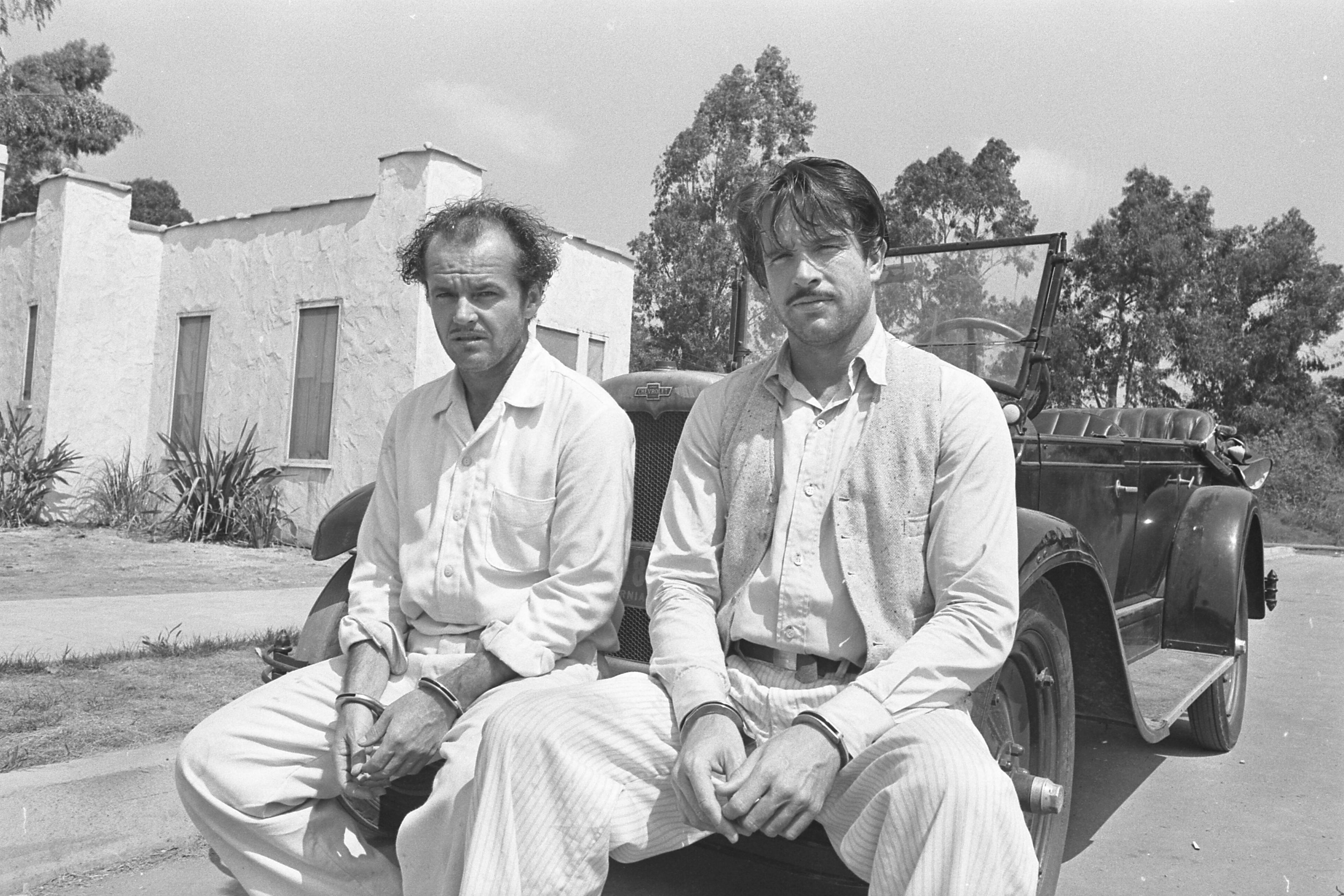
Nicholson and Warren Beatty filming The Fortune (1975)

Also in 1970, Nicholson appeared in the film adaptation of On a Clear Day You Can See Forever, although most of his performance was left on the cutting room floor. His agent turned down a starring role in Deliverance when the film's producer and director, John Boorman, refused to pay what Nicholson's agent wanted. In 1971, Nicholson starred in Carnal Knowledge, a comedy-drama directed by Mike Nichols and co-starring Art Garfunkel, Ann-Margret, and Candice Bergen. He was nominated for a Golden Globe Award for Best Actor. Nichols felt few actors could handle the role, saying: "There is James Cagney, Spencer Tracy, Humphrey Bogart, and Henry Fonda. After that, who is there but Jack Nicholson?" During the filming, Nicholson struck up what became a lifelong friendship with Garfunkel. When he visited Los Angeles, Garfunkel stayed at Nicholson's home, in a room Nicholson jokingly called "the Arthur Garfunkel Suite".

Other Nicholson roles included Hal Ashby's The Last Detail (1973), with Randy Quaid, for which Nicholson won Best Actor at the Cannes Film Festival and was nominated for his third Oscar and a Golden Globe. Television journalist David Gilmour wrote that one of his favorite Nicholson scenes from all his films was the often censored one in this film, when Nicholson slaps his gun on the bar yelling he was the Shore Patrol. Critic Roger Ebert called it a very good movie, but credited Nicholson's acting as the main reason: "He creates a character so complete and so complex that we stop thinking about the movie and just watch to see what he'll do next". In 1974, Nicholson starred in Roman Polanski's noir thriller Chinatown, and was again nominated for the Academy Award for Best Actor for his role as Jake Gittes, a private detective. The film co-starred Faye Dunaway and John Huston, and included a cameo role with Polanski. Ebert called Nicholson's portrayal sharp-edged, menacing, and aggressive, a character who knew "how to go over the top", as he did in One Flew Over the Cuckoo's Nest. That edge kept Chinatown from becoming a typical genre crime film. Ebert also noted the importance of the role for Nicholson's career, seeing it as a major transition from the exploitation films of the previous decade. "As Jake Gittes, he stepped into Bogart's shoes", says Ebert. "As a man attractive to audiences because he suggests both comfort and danger ... From Gittes forward, Nicholson created the persona of a man who had seen it all and was still capable of being wickedly amused".

Nicholson had been friends with Polanski long before the murder of Polanski's wife, Sharon Tate, by the Manson Family, and supported him in the days following her death. After Tate's death, Nicholson began sleeping with a hammer under his pillow and took breaks from work to attend Manson's trial.

In 1977, three years after Chinatown, Polanski was arrested at Nicholson's home for the sexual assault of 13-year-old Samantha Geimer, who was modeling for Polanski during a magazine photo shoot around the pool. At the time, Nicholson was out of town making a film, but his steady girlfriend, actress Anjelica Huston, had dropped by unannounced to pick up some items. She heard Polanski in the other room say: "We'll be right out". Polanski then came out with Geimer and introduced her to Huston, and they chatted about Nicholson's two large dogs, which were sitting nearby. Huston recalled Geimer was wearing platform heels and appeared quite tall. After a few minutes of talking, Polanski had packed up his camera gear and Huston saw them drive off in his car. Huston told police the next day, after Polanski was arrested, that she "had witnessed nothing untoward" and never saw them together in the other room.

Geimer learned afterward that Huston herself was not supposed to be at Nicholson's house that day, since they had recently broken up, but stopped over to pick up some belongings. Geimer described Nicholson's house as "definitely" a guy's house, with lots of wood and shelves crowded with photos and mementos.

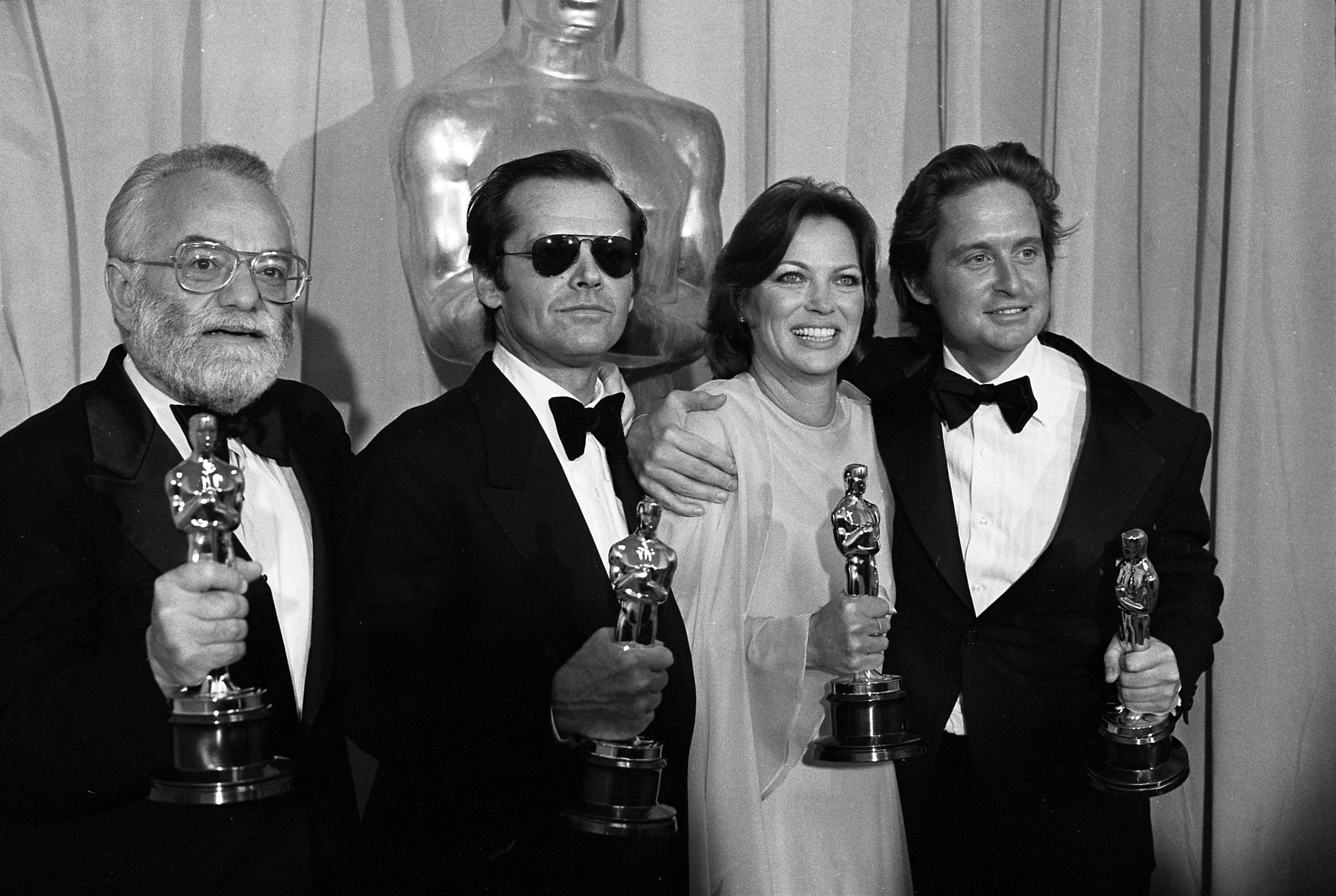
Saul Zaentz, Nicholson, Louise Fletcher and Michael Douglas at the 1976 Academy Awards

One of Nicholson's successes came in 1975, with his role as Randle P. McMurphy in One Flew Over the Cuckoo's Nest. The movie was an adaptation of Ken Kesey's novel of the same name, and was directed by Miloš Forman and co-produced by Michael Douglas. Nicholson plays an anti-authoritarian patient at a mental hospital where he becomes an inspiring leader for the other patients. Playing one of the patients was Danny DeVito in an early role. Nicholson learned afterward that DeVito grew up in the same area of New Jersey, and they knew many of the same people. The film received nine nominations at the Academy Awards, and won five, including Nicholson's first for Best Actor. The role seemed perfect for Nicholson, with biographer Ken Burke noting that his "smartass demeanor balances his genuine concern for the treatment of his fellow patients with his independent spirit too free to exist in a repressive social structure". Forman allowed Nicholson to improvise throughout the film, including most of the group therapy sequences. Reviewer Marie Brenner noted that his bravura performance "transcends the screen" and continually inspires the other actors by lightening their mental illnesses with his comic dialogue.

Nicholson is everywhere; his energy propels the ward of loonies and makes of them an ensemble, a chorus of people caught in a bummer with nowhere else to go, but still fighting for some frail sense of themselves. ... There are scenes in Cuckoo's Nest that are as intimate—and in their language, twice as rough—as the best moments in The Godfather ... [and] far above the general run of Hollywood performances.

— Marie Brenner, Texas Monthly

Also in 1975, Nicholson starred in Michelangelo Antonioni's The Passenger (1975), which co-starred Maria Schneider. Nicholson plays a journalist, David Locke, who during an assignment in North Africa decides to quit journalism and disappear by taking on a new hidden identity. Unfortunately, the dead person whose identity he takes on turns out to have been a weapons smuggler on the run. Antonioni's unusual plot included convincing dialogue and fine acting, states film critic Seymour Chatman. It was shot in Algeria, Spain, Germany and England. The film received good reviews and revived Antonioni's reputation as a great director. He said he wanted the film to have more of a "spy feeling [and] be more political". Nicholson began shooting the film from an unfinished script, noted Judith Crist, yet upon its completion he thought so highly of the film that he bought the world rights and recorded a reminiscence of working with Antonioni.

Critic and screenwriter Penelope Gilliatt provided an overview of Nicholson's role: "The Passenger is an unidealized portrait of a drained man whose one remaining stimulus is to push his luck. Again and again, in the movie, we watch him court danger. It interests him to walk the edge of risk. He does it with passivity as if he were taking part in an expressionless game of double-dare with life. Jack Nicholson's performance is a wonder of insight. How to animate a personality that is barely there".

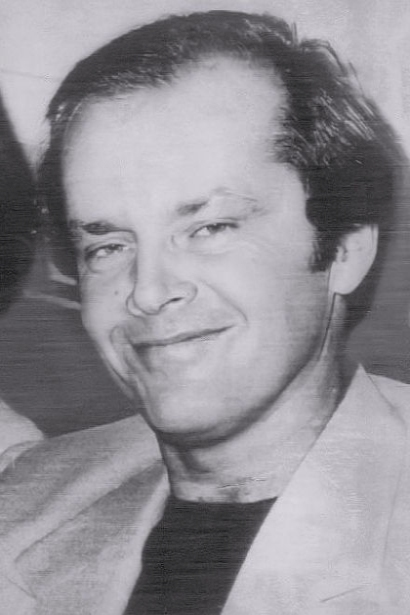
Nicholson in 1976

Nicholson continued to take more unusual roles. He took a small role in The Last Tycoon opposite Robert De Niro. He took a less sympathetic role in Arthur Penn's western The Missouri Breaks (1976), specifically to work with Marlon Brando. Nicholson was especially inspired by Brando's acting ability, recalling that in his youth, as an assistant manager at a theater, he had watched On the Waterfront about 40 times. He once stated: "Marlon Brando influenced me strongly. Today, it's hard for people who weren't there to realize the impact that Brando had on an audience. ... He's always been the patron saint of actors". "I'm part of the first generation that idolized Marlon Brando", he said.

Nicholson has observed that, while both De Niro and Brando were noted for their skill as method actors, he himself has seldom been described as one, a fact he sees as an accomplishment: "I'm still fooling them", he told Sean Penn. "I consider it an accomplishment because there's probably no one who understands Method acting better academically than I do—or actually uses it more in his work. But it's funny, nobody really sees that. It's perception versus reality, I guess".

His work is always interesting, clearly conceived, and has the X-factor, magic. Jack is particularly suited for roles that require intelligence. He is an intelligent and literate man, and these are almost impossible to act. In The Shining you believe he's a writer, failed or otherwise.

— Stanley Kubrick

Although he garnered no Academy Award for Stanley Kubrick's adaptation of Stephen King's The Shining (1980), his role in the film as writer Jack Torrance remains one of his more significant. He was Kubrick's first choice to play the role, although the book's author, Stephen King, wanted more of an "everyman". Kubrick won the argument and called Nicholson's acting "on a par with the greatest stars of the past, like Spencer Tracy and Jimmy Cagney". In preparation for the role, Nicholson drew upon his own experiences as a writer and slept short hours to help remain in an agitated state during the shoot. His co-star Shelley Duvall recalled that she and Nicholson spent many hours discussing their characters, with Nicholson maintaining that his character be cold to her from the start. On the set, Nicholson always appeared in character and if Kubrick felt confident that Nicholson knew his lines well enough, he encouraged him to improvise beyond the script. For example, Nicholson improvised his now-famous "Here's Johnny!" line, along with a scene in which he unleashes his anger on his wife when she interrupts his work. There were also extensive takes of scenes, due to Kubrick's perfectionism. Nicholson shot a scene with the ghostly bartender 36 times. He said: "Stanley's demanding. He'll do a scene fifty times, and you have to be good to do that".

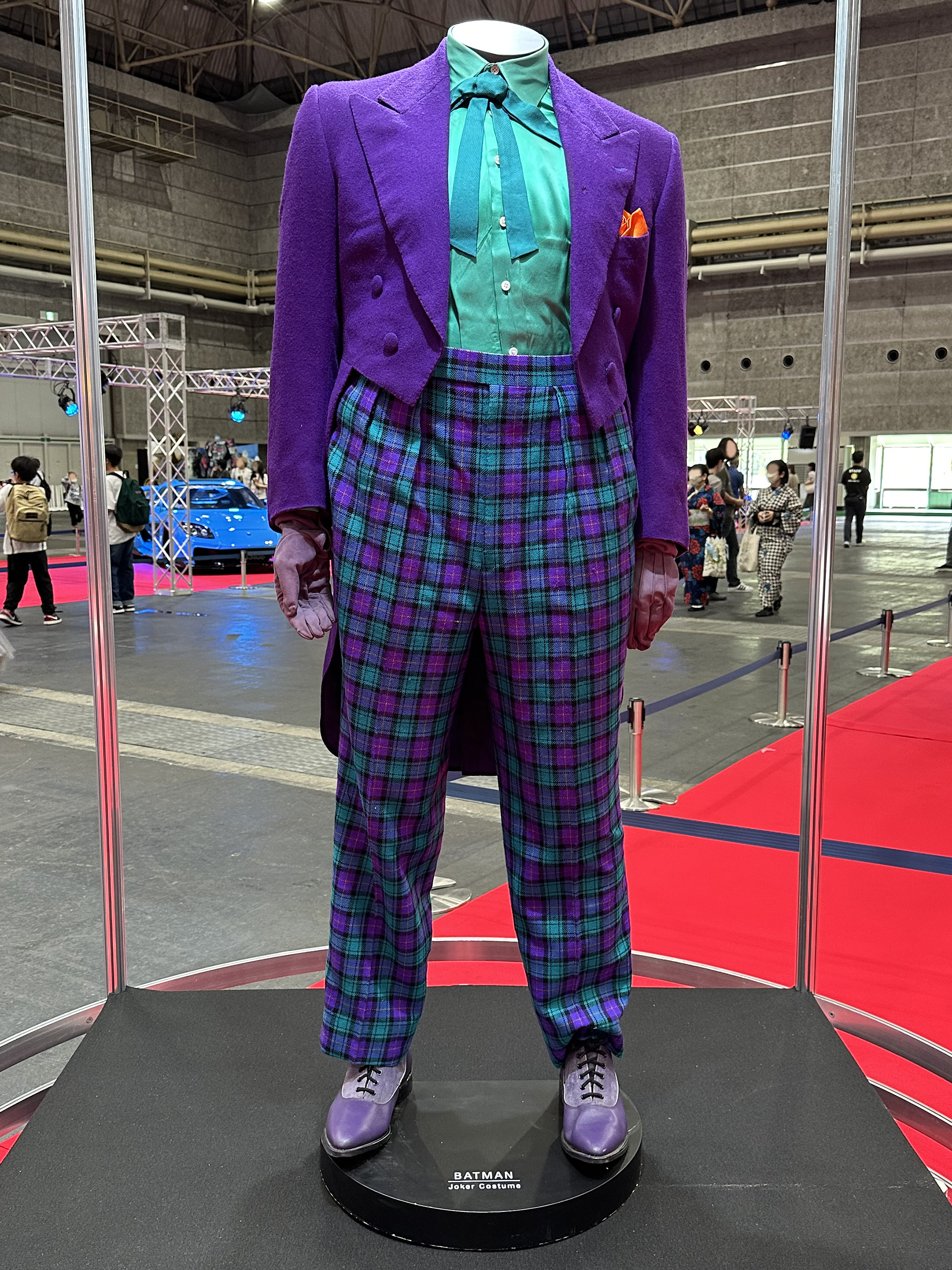
Costumes worn by Nicholson as the Joker in Batman (1989)

In 1982, Nicholson starred as an immigration enforcement agent in The Border, directed by Tony Richardson. It co-starred Warren Oates, who played a corrupt border official. Richardson wanted Nicholson to play his role less expressively than he had in his earlier roles. "Less is more", he told him, and wanted him to wear reflecting sunglasses to portray what patrolmen wore. Richardson recalled that Nicholson worked hard on the set:

He's what the Thirties and Forties stars were like. He can come on the set and deliver, without any fuss, without taking a long time walking around getting into it. "What do you want? Okay". And he just does it straight off. And then if you want him to do it another way on the next take, he can adapt to that too.

Nicholson won his second Academy Award for his role of retired astronaut Garrett Breedlove in Terms of Endearment (1983), directed by James L. Brooks. It starred Shirley MacLaine and Debra Winger. McGilligan claimed that it was one of Nicholson's most complex and unforgettable characters. He and MacLaine played many of their scenes in different ways, constantly testing and making adjustments. Their scenes together gave the film its "buoyant edge", stated McGilligan, and described Nicholson's acting as "Jack floating like a butterfly".

Nicholson continued to work prolifically in the 1980s, starring in such films as: The Postman Always Rings Twice (1981); Reds (1981), where Nicholson portrays the writer Eugene O'Neill with a quiet intensity; Prizzi's Honor (1985), Heartburn (1986), The Witches of Eastwick (1987), Broadcast News (1987), and Ironweed (1987). He received three Oscar nominations for Reds, Prizzi's Honor, and Ironweed). John Huston, who directed Prizzi's Honor, said of Nicholson's acting: "He just illuminates the book. He impressed me in one scene after another; the movie is composed largely of first takes with him". In Tim Burton's 1989 superhero film Batman, Nicholson portrayed the Joker opposite Michael Keaton as the title character. The film was an international smash hit, and a lucrative deal earned him a percentage of the box office gross, estimated at $60 million to $90 million. Nicholson said that he was "particularly proud" of his performance as the Joker, calling it "a piece of pop art". The role became one of the defining performances of Nicholson's career and was widely considered to overshadow Keaton's Batman, with film critic Roger Ebert noting that audiences sometimes had to remind themselves not to root for the Joker.

=== 1990–1999: Established actor ===
For his role as hot-headed Col. Nathan R. Jessup in A Few Good Men (1992), a movie about a murder in a U.S. Marine Corps unit, Nicholson received his tenth Academy Award nomination. One review described his performance as "spellbinding", adding that he portrayed "the essence of the quintessential military mindset". Critic David Thomson noted that Nicholson's character "blazed and roared". The film's director, Rob Reiner, recalled how Nicholson's level of acting experience affected the other actors during rehearsals: "I had the luck of having Jack Nicholson there. He knows what he's doing, and he comes to play, every time out, full-out performance! And what it says to a lot of the other actors is: 'Oooooh, I better get on my game here because this guy's coming to play! So I can't hold back; I've got to come up to him'. He sets the tone". He received two Golden Raspberry Award for Worst Actor nominations for Man Trouble (1992) and Hoffa (1992), although his performance in Hoffa also earned him a Golden Globe nomination. David Thomson stated that the film was terribly neglected, since Nicholson portrayed one of his best screen characters, someone who is "snarly, dumb, smart, noble, rascally—all the parts of 'Jack'". Roger Ebert also praised his performance, writing: "Nicholson is an actor who can reflect almost anything in his face. One reason his performance is so good as Hoffa is that he reveals almost nothing".

In 1996, Nicholson collaborated once more with Batman director Tim Burton on Mars Attacks!, playing the dual roles of President James Dale and Las Vegas property developer Art Land. Mars Attacks! was released in December 1996 to mixed reviews and flopped at the box office.

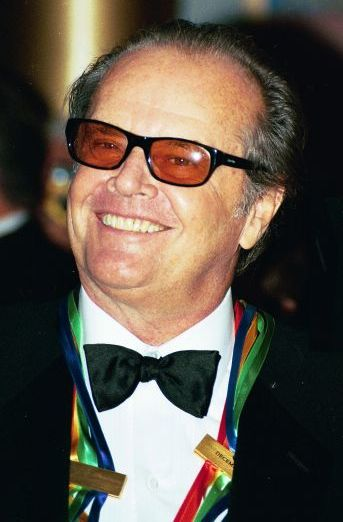
Nicholson in 2001

Nicholson won his third Academy Award in the romantic comedy As Good as It Gets (1997), his third film directed by James L. Brooks. He played Melvin Udall, a "wickedly funny", mean-spirited novelist with obsessive-compulsive disorder. He said: "I'm a studio Method actor, so I was prone to give some kind of clinical presentation of the disorder". His Oscar was matched by the Academy Award for Best Actress for his co-star Helen Hunt, who played a Manhattan single mother and waitress drawn into a love/hate friendship with Udall. The film was a box-office success, grossing $314 million, making it Nicholson's second-best-grossing film, after Batman. The win was Nicholson's third Academy Award, tying him with six other actors, Walter Brennan, Ingrid Bergman, Meryl Streep, Daniel Day-Lewis and Frances McDormand, who all have three acting Oscars.

Nicholson admitted that he initially disliked playing a middle-aged man alongside a much younger Hunt, seeing it as a movie cliché. "But Helen disarmed that at the first meeting", he said, "and I stopped thinking about it". They got along well during the filming, with Hunt saying that he "treated me like a queen", and they connected immediately: "It wasn't even what we said", she said. "It was just some frequency we both could tune into that was very, very compatible". Critic Jack Mathews of Newsday said Nicholson that was "in rare form", adding that "it's one of those performances that make you aware how much fun the actor is having". Author and screenwriter Andrew Horton described their on-screen relationship as being like "fire and ice, oil and water—seemingly complete opposites".

=== 2000–present: Later roles and retirement ===
In 2001, Nicholson was the first actor to receive the Stanislavsky Award at the 23rd Moscow International Film Festival for "conquering the heights of acting and faithfulness". That same year, Nicholson starred in The Pledge, a mystery drama written by Swiss author Friedrich Dürrenmatt, where he portrayed retired police detective Jerry Black, who vows to find a murderer of a young girl. Nicholson was praised for his performance; Bob Graham of the San Francisco Chronicle called it "deeply felt" compared to some of Nicholson's other films. Nicholson was one of several celebrities who participated in a telethon shortly after the September 11th attacks.

Nicholson acted in Alexander Payne's comedy-drama About Schmidt (2002), playing a retired Nebraska actuary who questions his own life after his wife dies. His quietly restrained performance earned him nominations for an Academy Award, BAFTA Award, and Actor Award and won the Golden Globe Award for Best Actor in a Motion Picture – Drama and the Critics' Choice Award for Best Actor. In Anger Management (2003), he played an aggressive therapist assigned to help an overly pacifist man, portrayed by Adam Sandler. Also in 2003, Nicholson also starred in the Nancy Meyers-directed romantic comedy Something's Gotta Give, playing an aging playboy who falls for the mother (Diane Keaton) of his young girlfriend. For his performance, he was nominated for the Golden Globe Award for Best Actor in a Movie – Musical or Comedy.

In 2006, Nicholson returned to darker roles as Frank Costello, a nefarious Boston Irish Mob boss based on Whitey Bulger, in Martin Scorsese's Best Picture–winning film The Departed, a remake of Andrew Lau's Infernal Affairs. The role earned Nicholson worldwide critical praise and BAFTA, Golden Globe, Critics' Choice and Actor Award nominations. In 2007, Nicholson co-starred with Morgan Freeman in Rob Reiner's The Bucket List, in which Nicholson and Freeman portrayed dying men who fulfill their list of goals. In researching the role, Nicholson visited a Los Angeles hospital to see how cancer patients coped with their illnesses.

Nicholson is the Hollywood celebrity who is most like a character in some ongoing novel of our times. He is also the most beloved of stars—not even his huge wealth, his reckless aging, and the public disasters of his private life can detract from this ... For he is still a touchstone, someone we value for the way he helps us see ourselves.

— David Thomson, a film critic.

Nicholson's next film role saw him reunite with James L. Brooks, director of Terms of Endearment, Broadcast News and As Good as It Gets, for a supporting role for the 2010 film How Do You Know starring Paul Rudd, Reese Witherspoon, and Owen Wilson. The film was a massive financial and critical failure. In a September 2013 Vanity Fair article, Nicholson said that he did not consider himself retired, but that he was now less driven to "be out there anymore".

As of 2026, How Do You Know remains Nicholson's last film role and brings his filmography to 80 films. In 2010, Nicholson participated in a telethon for Haiti after the Earthquake. In 2013, Nicholson co-presented the Academy Award for Best Picture with First Lady Michelle Obama, the eighth time he presented the Academy Award for Best Picture (after 1972, 1977, 1978, 1990, 1993, 2006 and 2007).

On February 15, 2015, Nicholson made a special appearance as a presenter on SNL 40, the 40th anniversary special of Saturday Night Live. After the death of boxer Muhammad Ali on June 3, 2016, Nicholson appeared on HBO's The Fight Game with Jim Lampley for an exclusive interview about his friendship with Ali. He was reported to be starring in an English-language remake of Toni Erdmann in 2017 opposite Kristen Wiig, his first feature film role since How Do You Know, but the project was later abandoned. In October 2019, with the release of The Shining sequel Doctor Sleep, director Mike Flanagan revealed he approached Nicholson for a cameo appearance, but Nicholson declined with best wishes. Flanagan also disclosed that Nicholson had previously been approached to appear in Steven Spielberg's science-fiction film Ready Player One (2018).

On February 16, 2025, Nicholson made a rare appearance on SNL 50, the 50th anniversary special of Saturday Night Live. He introduced Adam Sandler, who performed a tribute song to the show.

== Influence ==
Actors who have cited Nicholson as an influence include Leonardo DiCaprio, Tom Cruise and Alden Ehrenreich.

== Acting credits and accolades ==
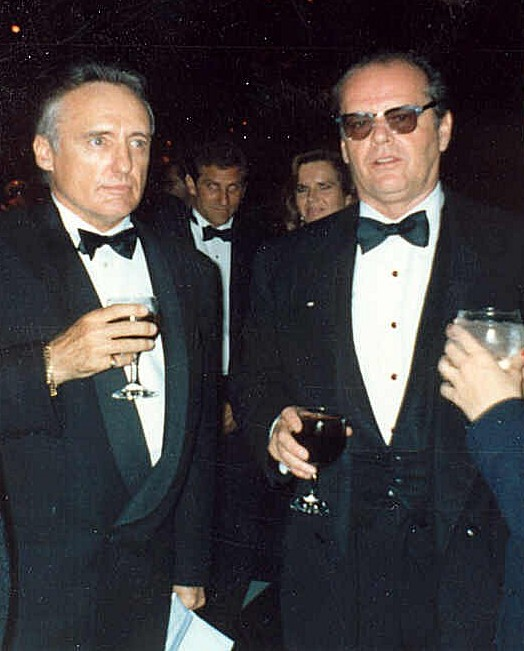
Nicholson with Easy Rider (1969) co-star Dennis Hopper at the 62nd Academy Awards in 1990

During his career, Nicholson has appeared in 80 films. Among some of Nicholson's films are:

- Easy Rider (1969)
- Five Easy Pieces (1970)
- Carnal Knowledge (1971)
- The Last Detail (1973)
- Chinatown (1974)
- The Passenger (1975)
- One Flew Over the Cuckoo's Nest (1975)
- The Shining (1980)
- Reds (1981)
- Terms of Endearment (1983)
- Prizzi's Honor (1985)
- Heartburn (1986)
- Ironweed (1987)
- Batman (1989)
- A Few Good Men (1992)
- As Good as It Gets (1997)
- About Schmidt (2002)
- The Departed (2006)
- How Do You Know (2010)

With 12 Academy Award nominations (eight for Best Actor and four for Best Supporting Actor), Nicholson is the most nominated male actor in Academy Awards history. Only Nicholson (1960s–2000s), Michael Caine (1960s–2000s), Meryl Streep (1970s–2010s), Paul Newman (1950s–1960s, 1980s–2000s), Katharine Hepburn (1930s–1960s, 1980s), Frances McDormand (1980s–2020s), Denzel Washington (1980s–2020s), and Laurence Olivier (1930s–1970s) have been nominated for an acting (lead or supporting) Academy Award in five decades. With three Oscar wins, he also ties with Walter Brennan, Daniel Day-Lewis, Ingrid Bergman, Frances McDormand, Meryl Streep, and Sean Penn for the second-most Oscar wins in acting categories. Only Katharine Hepburn, with four Oscars, won more.

Nicholson is an active and voting member of the Academy. In 1990, Nicholson was honored in France by Jack Lang, the Minister of Culture, with a Commander of Arts and Letters. In May 2008, the California Governor Arnold Schwarzenegger and First Lady Maria Shriver announced that Nicholson would be inducted into the California Hall of Fame, located at The California Museum in Sacramento. The induction ceremony took place on December 15, 2008, where he was inducted alongside 11 other Californians.

In 2010, Nicholson was inducted into the New Jersey Hall of Fame. In 2011, Nicholson received an honorary Doctor of Fine Arts degree from Brown University at its 243rd commencement. At the ceremony, Ruth Simmons, Brown University's president, called him "the most skilled actor of our lifetime".

In 2018, the Australian fishing spider Ornodolomedes nicholsoni was named in his honor for "brilliantly portraying diverse personalities".

== Unrealized Napoleon project ==
In a 1995 interview, Nicholson told film critic William Arnold that perhaps the greatest frustration of his career was his inability to make a film about Napoleon, who he considered one of the greatest, and most misunderstood, men of history. Nicholson owned the film rights to the 1982 book, The Murder of Napoleon, and tried many times over the years to get it off the ground, but, for a variety of reasons, was unsuccessful. "I can't tell you how much I would like to make a movie about him," he told Arnold, "and how maddening it is not to be able to".

== Personal life ==
Nicholson's children
- with Sandra Knight
  - Jennifer Nicholson (born 1963)
- with Susan Anspach
  - Caleb Goddard (born 1970)
- with Winnie Hollman
  - Honey Hollman (born 1982)
- with Rebecca Broussard
  - Lorraine Nicholson (born 1990)
  - Ray Nicholson (born 1992)
- with Jennine Gourin
  - Tessa Gourin (born 1994)

=== Relationships and children ===
In his private life, Nicholson is notorious for his inability to "settle down"; he has fathered six children by five women but married only once. Nicholson's marriage was to The Terror co-star Sandra Knight from 1962 to 1968, though they separated in 1966. The couple had one daughter, born in 1963.

Five Easy Pieces co-star Susan Anspach contended that her son, Caleb (b. September 26, 1970), whose legal father was Mark Goddard, was actually Nicholson's biological son. In 1984, Nicholson said he was not convinced of this, but in 1996, Caleb said that Nicholson had recognized him as his son in private. By 1998, Nicholson publicly acknowledged him as his son and said that they got along "beautifully now".

In 1971 and 1972, Nicholson was in a relationship with singer Michelle Phillips, the ex-wife of his best friend Dennis Hopper, during which time she suffered a miscarriage. Nicholson's longest relationship was with actress Anjelica Huston, from 1973 until 1990. Their on-again, off-again romance included several periods of overlap with other women, notably former Bond girl Jill St. John and Danish model Winnie Hollman, with whom Nicholson had a daughter, Honey Hollman (born January 26, 1982). In 1999, it was discovered that Honey's biological father is producer Lou Adler. Despite this, Honey later stated she has a "normal father-daughter relationship" with Nicholson.

The relationship with Huston ended amid actress Rebecca Broussard's first pregnancy by Nicholson. He and Broussard had two children, Lorraine (b. April 16, 1990) and Raymond (b. February 20, 1992). The pair split up in 1994. That same year, Nicholson reportedly had a daughter, born in 1994, with waitress Jeannine Gourin. Nicholson has never publicly acknowledged the child in question as his daughter.

Beginning in the late 1990s, Nicholson was involved with actress Lara Flynn Boyle. The two initially broke up in 2000, later reuniting before splitting permanently in 2004, after which Nicholson was linked to English supermodel Kate Moss. In 2006, Nicholson dated actress Paz de la Huerta.

Nicholson has said that children "give your life a resonance that it can't have without them... As a father, I'm there all the time. I give unconditional love". He has also lamented that he "didn't see enough of my eldest daughter because I was trying to make a career".

=== Legal issues ===
In a criminal complaint filed on February 8, 1994, Robert Blank stated that Nicholson, then 56, approached Blank's Mercedes-Benz while he was stopped at a red light in North Hollywood. After accusing Blank of cutting him off in traffic, Nicholson used a golf club to bash the roof and windshield of Blank's car. A witness confirmed Blank's account of the incident and misdemeanor charges of assault and vandalism were filed against Nicholson. Charges were dropped after Nicholson apologized to Blank, and the two reached an undisclosed settlement, which included a reported $500,000 check from Nicholson.

In 1996, a lawsuit was brought against Nicholson alleging that he promised a woman named Catherine Sheehan $1,000 for sex and then assaulted her when she asked for the money. Sheehan received a settlement of about $40,000, but filed another lawsuit against him, arguing that the settlement was insufficient to cover the injuries inflicted upon her, including brain trauma, which she said were "actually killing" her. The case was dismissed.

=== Celebrity friendships ===
Nicholson lived next door to Marlon Brando for a number of years on Mulholland Drive in Beverly Hills, California. Warren Beatty also lived nearby, earning the road the nickname "Bad Boy Drive". After Brando's death in 2004, Nicholson purchased his bungalow for $6.1 million, with the purpose of having it demolished. Nicholson said he did so out of respect for Brando's legacy, as it had become too expensive to renovate the "derelict" building, which was plagued by mold.

Nicholson's friendship with author-journalist Hunter S. Thompson is described in Thompson's autobiography Kingdom of Fear (2003). After Thompson died in 2005, Nicholson and fellow actors Johnny Depp, John Cusack and Sean Penn attended his private memorial service in Colorado. Nicholson was also a close friend of Robert Evans, the producer of Chinatown, and after Evans lost Woodland, his home, as the result of a 1980s drug bust, Nicholson and other friends of Evans bought Woodland to give it back to him. Nicholson is also friends with fellow New Jerseyans Danny DeVito and Joe Pesci.

=== Hobbies ===
Nicholson is a fan of the New York Yankees and Los Angeles Lakers. He became a Lakers season ticket holder in 1970, and held courtside seats next to the opponent's benches both at The Forum and Staples Center. He was described as a "fixture" at the games, though his regular attendance had stopped by 2021, as he withdrew from public appearances. Nicholson occasionally argued with game officials and opposing players, and even walked onto the court. He was almost ejected from a Lakers playoff game in May 2003 after yelling at a referee. After the death of former Lakers star Kobe Bryant in a helicopter crash in January 2020, Nicholson gave a rare phone interview to Los Angeles station KCBS-TV expressing his grief. He attended a 2023 playoff game, which media outlets noted was his first appearance at a Lakers game in nearly two years.

Nicholson is a collector of 20th-century and contemporary paintings, including those of Henri Matisse, Tamara de Lempicka, Andy Warhol and Jack Vettriano. In 1995, artist Edward Ruscha said that Nicholson has "one of the best collections out here".

=== Political views ===
In 1998, Nicholson met Fidel Castro and referred to him as a "genius". In 2001, he met with Vladimir Putin at Moscow International Film Festival and offered him a job as a producer. Nicholson has called himself a "lifelong Irish Democrat". He supported George McGovern in the 1972 presidential election, Michael Dukakis in 1988, and Hillary Clinton in 2008.

In 1994, Nicholson gifted 60 acres of land to the Santa Monica Mountains Conservancy. Nicholson supports solar energy, decriminalizing drugs, monopoly laws, and raising teachers' pay. Although personally against abortion, he is pro-choice. He has said: "I'm pro-choice but against abortion because I'm an illegitimate child myself, and it would be hypocritical to take any other position. I'd be dead. I wouldn't exist". He has also said that he has "nothing but total admiration, gratitude, and respect for the strength of the women who made the decision they made in my individual case".

=== Religious beliefs ===
Nicholson was raised Roman Catholic and has expressed admiration for the religion, calling it "the only official dogma training I've had. I liked it. It's a smart religion". It has been asserted that some of Nicholson's 1970s movie roles were influenced by Catholicism. In a 1992 Vanity Fair interview, Nicholson said: "I don't believe in God now. I can still work up an envy for someone who has faith. I can see how that could be a deeply soothing experience".

== General and cited bibliography ==
- Duncan, Paul (2003). Stanley Kubrick: The Complete Films. Taschen GmbH. ISBN 978-3-8365-2775-0.
