= List of awards and nominations received by Jack Nicholson =

Jack Nicholson awards and nominations
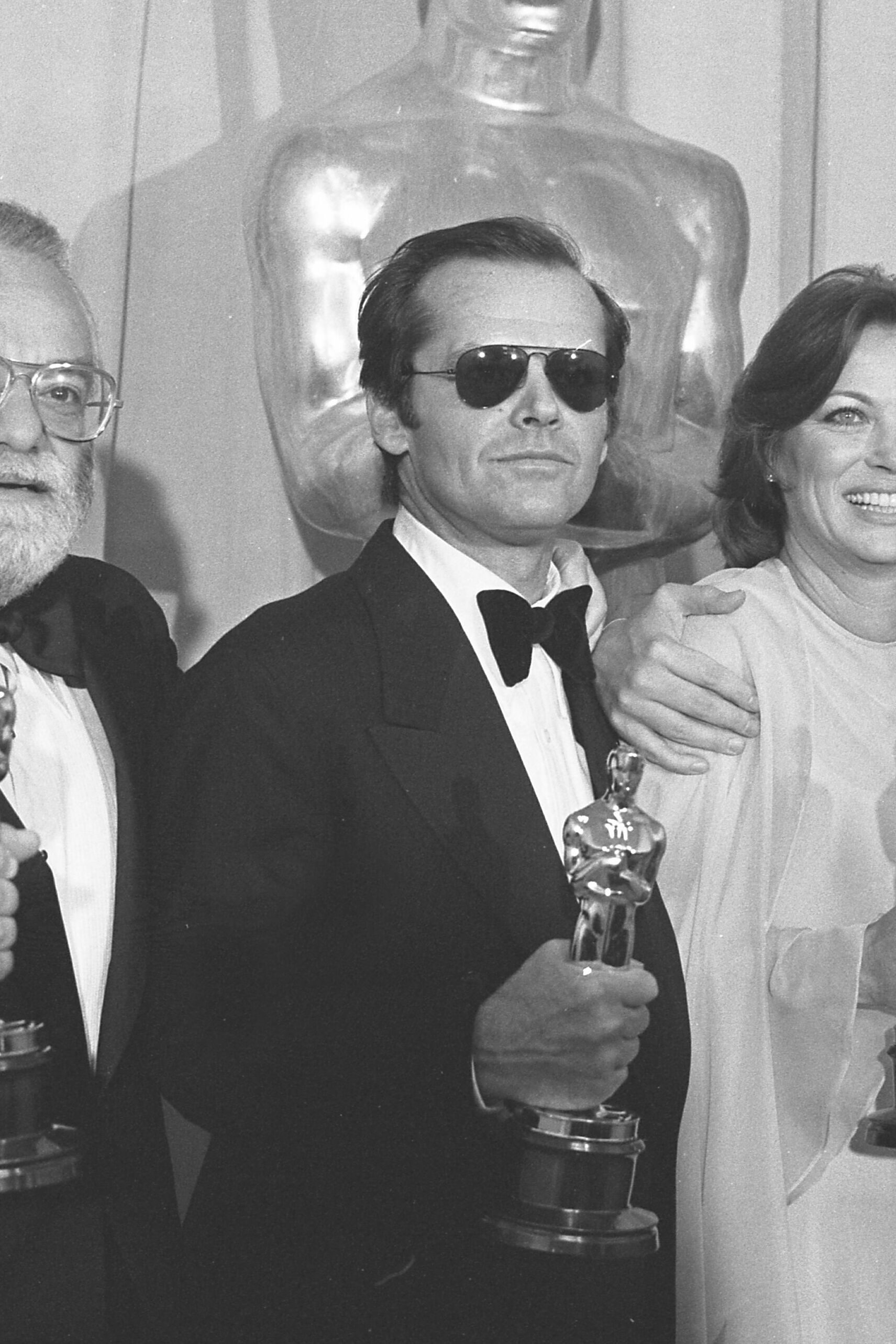
- Nicholson at the 48th Academy Awards
Awards and nominations
| Award | Wins | Nominations |
| Academy Awards | 3 | 12 |
| BAFTA Awards | 3 | 7 |
| Golden Globes | 6 | 17 |
| Grammy Awards | 1 | 1 |
| SAG Awards | 1 | 3 |
| Fajr Film Festival | 1 | 0 |

Totals (Note: Certain award groups do not simply award one winner. They acknowledge several different recipients, have runners-up, and have third place. Since this is a specific recognition and is different from losing an award, runner-up mentions are considered wins in this award tally. For simplification and to avoid errors, each award in this list has been presumed to have had a prior nomination.)
- Wins: 15
- Nominations: 149

American actor Jack Nicholson is one of only seven performers to have won three Academy Awards in the acting categories, and is the most nominated male performer in the acting categories, with a total of 12 nominations. His other major competitive awards include a Grammy Award, three BAFTA Awards, and six Golden Globes. He was also the recipient of the Cecil B DeMille Award at the 1999 Golden Globe Awards ceremony.

Nicholson won three Academy Awards, two for Best Actor for his roles as Randle McMurphy in the psychological drama One Flew Over the Cuckoo's Nest (1975) and a man suffering with obsessive–compulsive disorder in the romantic comedy As Good as It Gets (1997) as well as for Best Supporting Actor for playing a randy former astronaut Garrett Breedlove in the family melodrama Terms of Endearment (1983). Nicholson was further Oscar-nominated for his performances in the films Easy Rider (1969), Five Easy Pieces (1970), The Last Detail (1973), Chinatown (1974), Reds (1981), Prizzi's Honor (1985), Ironweed (1987), A Few Good Men (1992), and About Schmidt (2002).

He won three British Academy Film Awards, two for Best Actor in a Leading Role for The Last Detail / Chinatown, and One Flew Over the Cuckoo's Nest and for Best Actor in a Supporting Role for Reds. He won the Cannes Film Festival Award for Best Actor for his role in The Last Detail (1973). He won the Screen Actors Guild Award for Outstanding Performance by a Male Actor in a Leading Role for As Good as it Gets. Nicholson won six competitive Golden Globe Awards for Chinatown (1974), One Flew over the Cuckoo's Nest (1975), Terms of Endearment (1983), Prizzi's Honor (1985), As Good as it Gets (1997), and About Schmidt (2002).

Nicholson also won the Grammy Award for Best Children's Music Album for The Elephant's Child in 1988.

== Major associations ==
=== Academy Awards ===
| Year | Category | Nominated work | Result | Ref. |
|---|---|---|---|---|
| 1970 | Best Supporting Actor | Easy Rider | Nominated | |
| 1971 | Best Actor | Five Easy Pieces | Nominated | |
| 1974 | Best Actor | The Last Detail | Nominated | |
| 1975 | Best Actor | Chinatown | Nominated | |
| 1976 | Best Actor | One Flew Over the Cuckoo's Nest | Won | |
| 1982 | Best Supporting Actor | Reds | Nominated | |
| 1984 | Best Supporting Actor | Terms of Endearment | Won | |
| 1986 | Best Actor | Prizzi's Honor | Nominated | |
| 1988 | Best Actor | Ironweed | Nominated | |
| 1993 | Best Supporting Actor | A Few Good Men | Nominated | |
| 1998 | Best Actor | As Good as It Gets | Won | |
| 2003 | Best Actor | About Schmidt | Nominated | |

=== BAFTA Awards ===
| Year | Category | Nominated work | Result | Ref. |
British Academy Film Awards
| 1970 | Best Actor in a Supporting Role | Easy Rider | Nominated | |
| 1975 | Best Actor in a Leading Role | The Last Detail / Chinatown | Won | |
| 1977 | Best Actor in a Leading Role | One Flew Over the Cuckoo's Nest | Won | |
| 1983 | Best Actor in a Supporting Role | Reds | Won | |
| 1990 | Best Actor in a Supporting Role | Batman | Nominated | |
| 2003 | Best Actor in a Leading Role | About Schmidt | Nominated | |
| 2007 | Best Actor in a Supporting Role | The Departed | Nominated | |

=== Cannes Film Festival ===
| Year | Category | Nominated work | Result | Ref. |
|---|---|---|---|---|
| 1974 | Best Actor | The Last Detail | Won | |

=== Critics' Choice Awards ===
| Year | Category | Nominated work | Result | Ref. |
Critics' Choice Movie Awards
| 1997 | Best Actor | As Good as It Gets | Won | |
| 2002 | Best Actor (Note: tied with Daniel Day-Lewis) | About Schmidt | Won | |
| 2006 | Best Supporting Actor | The Departed | Nominated | |

=== Golden Globe Awards ===
| Year | Category | Nominated work | Result | Ref. |
|---|---|---|---|---|
| 1970 | Best Supporting Actor – Motion Picture | Easy Rider | Nominated | |
| 1971 | Best Actor in a Motion Picture – Drama | Five Easy Pieces | Nominated | |
| 1972 | Best Actor in a Motion Picture – Drama | Carnal Knowledge | Nominated | |
| 1974 | Best Actor in a Motion Picture – Drama | The Last Detail | Nominated | |
| 1974 | Best Actor in a Motion Picture – Drama | Chinatown | Won | |
| 1976 | Best Actor in a Motion Picture – Drama | One Flew Over the Cuckoo's Nest | Won | |
| 1982 | Best Supporting Actor – Motion Picture | Reds | Nominated | |
| 1984 | Best Supporting Actor – Motion Picture | Terms of Endearment | Won | |
| 1986 | Best Actor in a Motion Picture – Musical or Comedy | Prizzi's Honor | Won | |
| 1988 | Best Actor in a Motion Picture – Drama | Ironweed | Nominated | |
| 1990 | Best Actor in a Motion Picture – Musical or Comedy | Batman | Nominated | |
| 1993 | Best Supporting Actor – Motion Picture | A Few Good Men | Nominated | |
| 1993 | Best Actor in a Motion Picture – Drama | Hoffa | Nominated | |
| 1998 | Best Actor in a Motion Picture – Musical or Comedy | As Good as It Gets | Won | |
| 2003 | Best Actor in a Motion Picture – Drama | About Schmidt | Won | |
| 2004 | Best Actor in a Motion Picture – Musical or Comedy | Something's Gotta Give | Nominated | |
| 2007 | Best Supporting Actor – Motion Picture | The Departed | Nominated | |
Honorary awards
| 1999 | Cecil B. DeMille Award | | Honored | |

=== Grammy Awards ===
| Year | Category | Nominated work | Result | Ref. |
|---|---|---|---|---|
| 1988 | Best Recording for Children (Note: Shared with Bobby McFerrin, Mark Sottnick, and Tom Bradshaw) | The Elephant's Child | Won | |

=== Screen Actors Guild Awards ===
| Year | Category | Nominated work | Result | Ref. |
|---|---|---|---|---|
| 1998 | Outstanding Actor in a Motion Picture | As Good as It Gets | Won | |
| 2003 | Outstanding Actor in a Motion Picture | About Schmidt | Nominated | |
| 2007 | Outstanding Ensemble in a Motion Picture | The Departed | Nominated | |

== Industry awards ==
=== MTV Movie & TV Awards ===
| Year | Category | Nominated work | Result | Ref. |
|---|---|---|---|---|
| 1993 | Best Movie Male Performance | A Few Good Men | Nominated | |
| 1993 | Best Movie Villain | A Few Good Men | Nominated | |
| 2007 | Best Movie Villain | The Departed | Won | |

=== National Board of Review ===
The National Board of Review was founded in 1909 in New York City to award "film, domestic and foreign, as both art and entertainment". Nicholson has received six awards.

| Year | Category | Nominated work | Result | Ref. |
|---|---|---|---|---|
| 1975 | Best Actor | One Flew Over the Cuckoo's Nest | Won | |
| 1981 | Best Supporting Actor | Reds | Won | |
| 1983 | Best Supporting Actor | Terms of Endearment | Won | |
| 1992 | Best Supporting Actor | A Few Good Men | Won | |
| 1997 | Best Actor | As Good as It Gets | Won | |
| 2006 | Best Cast | The Departed | Won | |

=== Satellite Awards ===
The Satellite Awards are a set of annual awards given by the International Press Academy. Nicholson has received two awards from five nominations.

| Year | Category | Nominated work | Result | Ref. |
|---|---|---|---|---|
| 1997 | Best Actor in a Motion Picture – Comedy or Musical | Mars Attacks! | Nominated | |
| 1998 | Best Actor in a Motion Picture – Comedy or Musical | As Good as It Gets | Won | |
| 2003 | Best Actor in a Motion Picture – Drama | About Schmidt | Nominated | |
| 2006 | Best Ensemble Cast – Motion Picture | The Departed | Won | |
| 2006 | Best Supporting Actor in a Motion Picture – Drama | The Departed | Nominated | |

=== Saturn Awards ===
| Year | Category | Nominated work | Result |
|---|---|---|---|
| 1987 | Best Performance by a Lead Actor in a Film | The Witches of Eastwick | Won |
| 1989 | Best Performance by a Lead Actor in a Film | Batman | Nominated |
| 1994 | Best Performance by a Lead Actor in a Film | Wolf | Nominated |

== Film critic awards ==
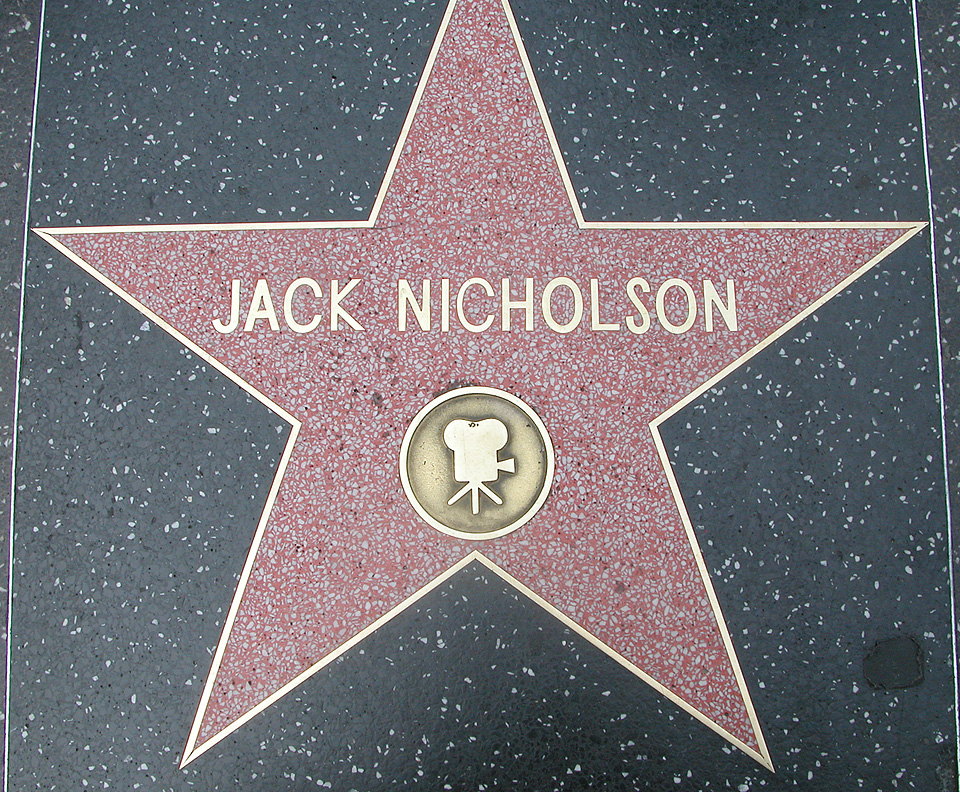
Nicholson's star on the Hollywood Walk of Fame

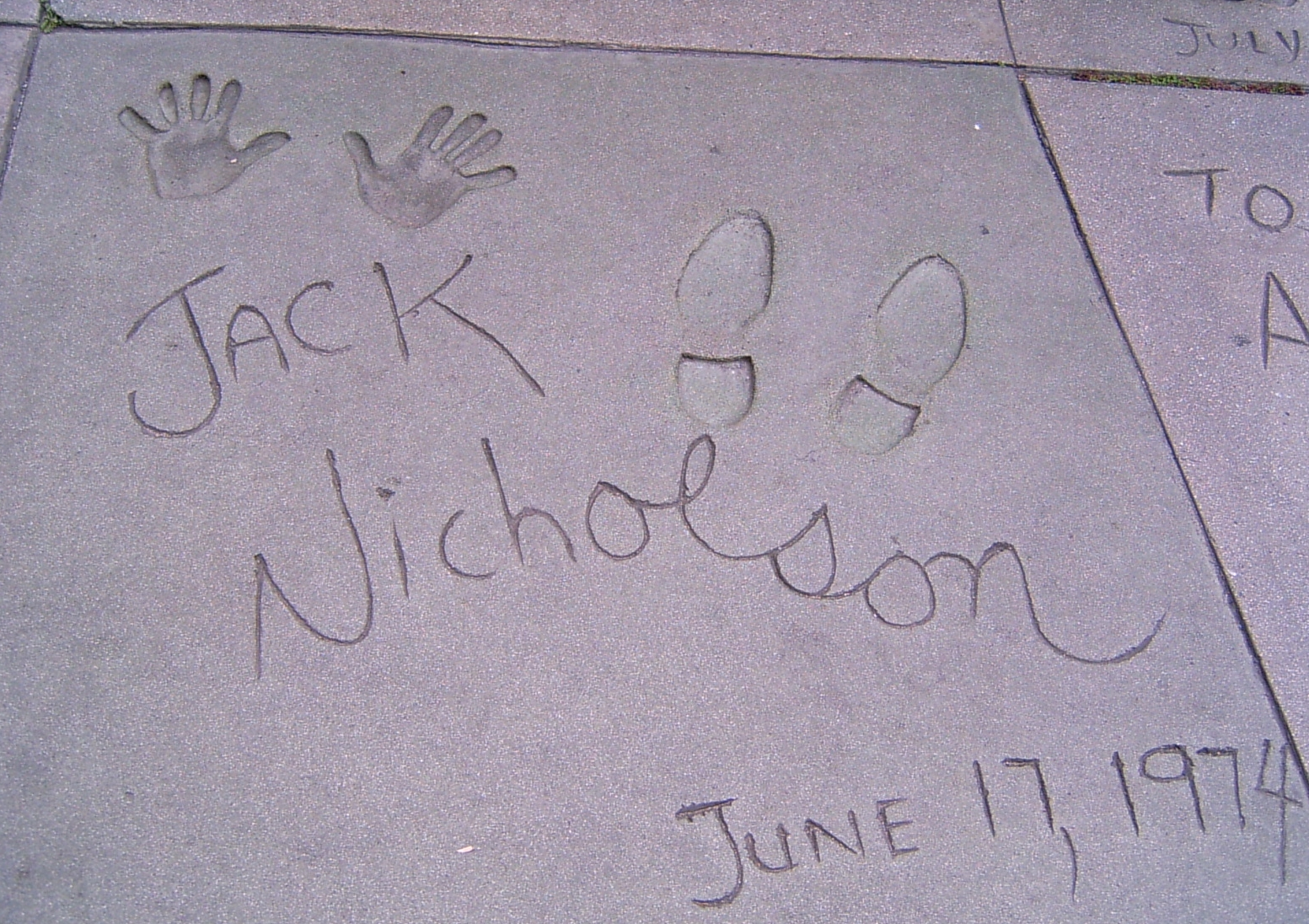
Nicholsons footprints and handprints at Grauman's Chinese Theatre in Los Angeles

| Year | Award | Category | Work | Result |
|---|---|---|---|---|
| 1969 | Kansas City Film Critics Circle | Best Supporting Actor | Easy Rider | Won |
| 1969 | National Society of Film Critics | Best Supporting Actor | Easy Rider | Won |
| 1969 | New York Film Critics Circle | Best Supporting Actor | Easy Rider | Won |
| 1970 | New York Film Critics Circle | Best Actor | Five Easy Pieces | Nominated |
| 1970 | National Society of Film Critics | Best Actor | Five Easy Pieces | Nominated |
| 1973 | National Society of Film Critics | Best Actor | The Last Detail; Chinatown | Won |
| 1973 | New York Film Critics Circle | Best Actor | The Last Detail; Chinatown | Won |
| 1974 | Kansas City Film Critics Circle | Best Actor | Chinatown | Won |
| 1975 | National Society of Film Critics | Best Actor | One Flew Over the Cuckoo's Nest | Won |
| 1975 | New York Film Critics Circle | Best Actor | One Flew Over the Cuckoo's Nest | Won |
| 1981 | Boston Society of Film Critics | Best Supporting Actor | Reds | Won |
| 1981 | Kansas City Film Critics Circle | Best Supporting Actor | Reds | Won |
| 1981 | Los Angeles Film Critics Association | Best Supporting Actor | Reds | Nominated |
| 1981 | New York Film Critics Circle | Best Actor | Reds | Nominated |
| 1983 | Boston Society of Film Critics | Best Supporting Actor | Terms of Endearment | Won |
| 1983 | Kansas City Film Critics Circle | Best Supporting Actor | Terms of Endearment | Won |
| 1983 | Los Angeles Film Critics Association | Best Supporting Actor | Terms of Endearment | Won |
| 1983 | National Society of Film Critics | Best Supporting Actor | Terms of Endearment | Won |
| 1983 | New York Film Critics Circle | Best Supporting Actor | Terms of Endearment | Won |
| 1985 | Boston Society of Film Critics | Best Actor | Prizzi's Honor | Won |
| 1985 | National Society of Film Critics | Best Actor | Prizzi's Honor | Won |
| 1985 | New York Film Critics Circle | Best Actor | Prizzi's Honor | Won |
| 1985 | Los Angeles Film Critics Association | Best Actor | Prizzi's Honor | Nominated |
| 1987 | Los Angeles Film Critics Association | Best Actor | The Witches of Eastwick | Won |
| 1987 | New York Film Critics Circle | Best Actor | The Witches of Eastwick | Won |
| 1987 | Los Angeles Film Critics Association | Best Actor | Ironweed | Won |
| 1989 | Chicago Film Critics Association | Best Supporting Actor | Batman | Nominated |
| 1992 | Chicago Film Critics Association | Best Supporting Actor | A Few Good Men | Won |
| 1992 | New York Film Critics Circle | Best Supporting Actor | A Few Good Men | Nominated |
| 1992 | Southeastern Film Critics Association | Best Supporting Actor | A Few Good Men | Won |
| 1997 | London Film Critics Circle | Best Actor | As Good as It Gets | Won |
| 1997 | Online Film Critics Society | Best Actor | As Good as It Gets | Won |
| 1997 | San Diego Film Critics Society | Best Actor | As Good as It Gets | Won |
| 1997 | Los Angeles Film Critics Association | Best Actor | As Good as It Gets | Nominated |
| 1997 | Southeastern Film Critics Association | Best Actor | As Good as It Gets | Nominated |
| 1997 | Toronto Film Critics Association | Best Actor | As Good as It Gets | Nominated |
| 1997 | Chicago Film Critics Association | Best Actor | As Good as It Gets | Nominated |
| 2002 | Dallas–Fort Worth Film Critics Association | Best Actor | About Schmidt | Won |
| 2002 | Los Angeles Film Critics Association | Best Actor | About Schmidt | Won |
| 2002 | Washington D.C. Area Film Critics Association | Best Actor | About Schmidt | Won |
| 2002 | New York Film Critics Circle | Best Actor | About Schmidt | Nominated |
| 2002 | San Diego Film Critics Society | Best Actor | About Schmidt | Nominated |
| 2002 | Southeastern Film Critics Association | Best Actor | About Schmidt | Nominated |
| 2002 | Chicago Film Critics Association | Best Actor | About Schmidt | Nominated |
| 2002 | London Film Critics Circle | Best Actor | About Schmidt | Nominated |
| 2002 | Online Film Critics Society | Best Actor | About Schmidt | Nominated |
| 2002 | Phoenix Film Critics Society | Best Actor | About Schmidt | Nominated |
| 2002 | Toronto Film Critics Association | Best Actor | About Schmidt | Nominated |
| 2006 | Florida Film Critics Circle | Best Supporting Actor | The Departed | Won |
| 2006 | Phoenix Film Critics Society | Best Supporting Actor | The Departed | Won |
| 2006 | Chicago Film Critics Association | Best Supporting Actor | The Departed | Nominated |
| 2006 | Dallas–Fort Worth Film Critics Association | Best Supporting Actor | The Departed | Nominated |
| 2006 | Online Film Critics Society | Best Supporting Actor | The Departed | Nominated |

== Miscellaneous awards ==
| Year | Award | Category | Work | Result |
|---|---|---|---|---|
| 1975 | David di Donatello | Best Foreign Actor | One Flew Over the Cuckoo's Nest | Won |
| 2002 | Fajr Film Festival | Crystal Simorgh for Best Foreign Actor | The Pledge | Won |
| 2003 | Teen Choice Awards | Choice Movie: Hissy Fit | Anger Management | Nominated |
| 2006 | People's Choice Awards | Best On-Screen Match-Up | The Departed | Nominated (Note: Shared with Matt Damon and Leonardo DiCaprio) |

== Others ==
| Year | Award | Result |
|---|---|---|
| 1994 | AFI Lifetime Achievement Award | Honored |
| 2001 | Stanislavsky Award | Honored |
| 2001 | Kennedy Center Honors | Honored |
