= Southeastern Film Critics Association =

American film critics association

- Abbreviation: SEFCA
- Formation: 1992
- Type: Film criticism
- Location: Southeastern United States
- Website: sefca.net

The Southeastern Film Critics Association (SEFCA) is a film critics association based in the Southeastern United States, and founded in 1992.

It presents the Southeastern Film Critics Association Awards each year, which recognize the top 10 best films of the year, along with the best filmmakers, actors, and screenwriters.

The accolades also include the Gene Wyatt Award, named in memory of the late The Tennessean film critic Gene Wyatt and presented to the film that "best evokes the spirit of the South."

== Award categories ==
- Top 10 Films
- Best Actor
- Best Actress
- Best Supporting Actor
- Best Supporting Actress
- Best Ensemble Cast
- Best Director
- Best Original Screenplay
- Best Adapted Screenplay
- Best Cinematography
- Best Score
- Best Foreign Language Film
- Best Animated Feature
- Best Documentary Feature
- The Gene Wyatt Award

== Best Film winners ==
Year	Best Film	Ref.
2025	One Battle After Another	
2024	Anora	
2023	Oppenheimer	
2022	Everything Everywhere All at Once	
2021	The Power of the Dog	
2020	Nomadland	
2019	Parasite	
2018	Roma	
2017	Get Out	
2016	Moonlight	
2015	Spotlight	
2014	The Grand Budapest Hotel	
2013	12 Years a Slave	
2012	Argo	
2011	The Descendants	
2010	The Social Network	
2009	Up in the Air	
2008	Milk	
2007	No Country for Old Men	
2006	The Departed	
2005	Brokeback Mountain	
2004	Sideways	
2003	The Lord of the Rings: The Return of the King	
2002	The Hours	
2001	Memento	
2000	Almost Famous	
1999	American Beauty	
1998	Saving Private Ryan	
1997	L.A. Confidential	
1996	Fargo	
1995	Apollo 13	
1994	Pulp Fiction	
1993	The Piano	
1992	Howards End	

== See also ==
- List of film awards
