= How Do You Know =

2010 romantic comedy film directed by James L. Brooks

- Theatrical release poster
- Directed by: James L. Brooks
- Written by: James L. Brooks
- Produced by: Julie Ansell; James L. Brooks; Laurence Mark; Paula Weinstein
- Starring: Reese Witherspoon; Owen Wilson; Paul Rudd; Jack Nicholson; Kathryn Hahn
- Cinematography: Janusz Kamiński
- Edited by: Richard Marks; Tracey Wadmore-Smith
- Music by: Hans Zimmer
- Production companies: Columbia Pictures; Gracie Films
- Distributed by: Sony Pictures Releasing
- Release dates: December 13, 2010 (Westwood); December 17, 2010 (United States)
- Running time: 121 minutes
- Country: United States
- Language: English
- Budget: $120 million
- Box office: $48.7 million

How Do You Know is a 2010 American romantic comedy film directed, written and produced by James L. Brooks, and starring Reese Witherspoon, Owen Wilson, Paul Rudd, and Jack Nicholson in his final appearance before his retirement. It was the third film to feature Witherspoon and Rudd, following Overnight Delivery and Monsters vs. Aliens. The plot follows softball player Lisa (Witherspoon), who is caught in a love triangle between two men—the charming baseball player Matty (Wilson) and George (Rudd), a businessman who is the target of an SEC stock fraud civil suit.

The film was shot in Philadelphia and Washington, D.C., and was released on December 17, 2010. The film underperformed at the box office, grossing $48.7 million against a $120 million budget, and received mixed-to-negative reviews from critics.

== Plot ==
Professional softball player Lisa Jorgenson begins dating Matty Reynolds, a pitcher for the Washington Nationals. She also receives an intriguing phone call from a young executive, George Madison, who was given Lisa's number by her friend to call. He calls out of politeness to explain that his relationship with his girlfriend Terry has just become more serious.

George's life takes an abrupt turn for the worse when he suddenly finds himself the target of a federal criminal investigation for corporate malfeasance at his father Charles Madison's company. He is fired from his job and abandoned by the company, with the exception of his father and his pregnant secretary Annie.

Still reeling from this blow, George goes to his girlfriend for sympathy and is stunned when she immediately breaks up with him. At the same time, Lisa is devastated to be left off the Team USA roster.

On a whim, George calls Lisa again to invite her to lunch, which she accepts. It turns out to be a disaster; he is so overwhelmed by his troubles that she eventually asks that they just eat in silence, then they part ways not expecting to see one another again.

Unsure what to do next, Lisa moves in with Matty, who has a penthouse in the same upscale building where George's father lives. Matty is rich, well-meaning, and fun, but is also immature and insensitive, and continues to have casual affairs with other women.

George is indicted and could face prison time. Annie is so loyal that she tries to give him inside information in advance, but he urges her not to lose her own job. George and Lisa bump into each other in Matty's building and he offers to help her carry her groceries home. When Matty returns home, he is upset to find Lisa at “his place” with an uninvited guest.

Matty inadvertently offends Lisa, so she moves out and spends a pleasant, tipsy evening at George's modest new apartment. His father then drops one last bombshell on his son: he committed the illegal act for which George is being charged. Due to a previous conviction, Charles would spend at least 25 years—basically, the rest of his life due to his advanced age—in prison, whereas George would only do three years at most.

On the night Annie's baby is born and her boyfriend proposes, Lisa begins to reconsider her previous reluctance to settle down. George is clearly smitten with her, but Matty pleads for another chance, so she accepts. George makes a proposition to his father: he will take one more shot at persuading Lisa to be with him. If she does, Charles must go to jail, and if she does not, George will take the rap for his dad.

At a birthday party that Matty throws for Lisa, George declares his feelings for her and asks her to meet him downstairs if she decides she reciprocates them. He then goes downstairs to give her time to think it over. Finally, Lisa says goodbye to Matty and joins George outside. Charles, looking on from above smiles at the sight, but his smile soon fades as he realizes he has to go to jail.

Lisa is confused about her feelings and tells George, "I thought you were this silly guy. Now it's like... everything but you seems silly." George suggests she has never felt the kind of overwhelming love where the guy is the whole deal, which helps her realize that she is in love with him. Lisa then reaches out and holds his hand as they board the bus together.

== Cast ==
- Reese Witherspoon as Lisa Jorgenson
  - Karsen Skinner and Kendel Skinner as young Lisa (uncredited)
- Owen Wilson as Matty Reynolds
- Paul Rudd as George Madison
- Jack Nicholson as Charles Madison
- Kathryn Hahn as Annie
- Mark Linn-Baker as Ron
- Lenny Venito as Al
- Molly Price as Coach Sally
- Ron McLarty as George's Lawyer
- Shelley Conn as Terry
- Domenick Lombardozzi as Bullpen Pitcher
- Dean Norris as Tom the softball coach
- John Tormey as Doorman
- Yuki Matsuzaki as Tori
- Andrew Wilson as Matty's Teammate
- Tony Shalhoub as Psychiatrist
- Teyonah Parris as Riva

== Production ==
James L. Brooks began work on the film in 2005, wishing to create a film about a young female athlete. While interviewing numerous women for hundreds of hours in his research for the film, he also became interested in "the dilemmas of contemporary business executives, who are sometimes held accountable by the law for corporate behavior of which they may not even be aware." He created Paul Rudd's and Jack Nicholson's characters for this concept. Filming finished in November 2009, although Brooks later reshot the film's opening and ending. Bill Murray was Brooks' original choice for the role of Charles Madison. The total production cost of the film was $120 million, with the net budget at about $100 million after tax rebates from Pennsylvania and the District of Columbia. The combined salaries for the director Brooks (about $10 million) and the four major stars Reese Witherspoon ($15 million), Nicholson ($12 million), Owen Wilson ($10 million) and Rudd ($3 million) totaled about $50 million. Brooks' "slow and meticulous" production and post-production process have been given as reasons for the size of the budget.

== Release ==
How Do You Know opened at $7.6 million in the United States and Canada, making it eighth at the box office on its first weekend. The film fell off the chart by its third weekend. On its opening day, December 17, 2010, it debuted at No. 5 behind Tron: Legacy, Yogi Bear, The Fighter and The Chronicles of Narnia: The Voyage of the Dawn Treader. By December 22, it was No. 11 in the box office. How Do You Know grossed a total of $48.7 million worldwide. In 2014, the Los Angeles Times listed the film as one of the biggest box office flops of all time.

== Reception ==
On Rotten Tomatoes, the film has an approval rating of 32% based on reviews from 149 critics. The site's critical consensus reads: "How Do You Know boasts a quartet of likable leads—and they deserve better than this glib, overlong misfire from writer/director James L. Brooks." On Metacritic it has a score of 46 out of 100 based on reviews from 38 critics, indicating "mixed or average" reviews. Audiences polled by CinemaScore gave the film an average grade of "C−" on an A+ to F scale.

Todd McCarthy of The Hollywood Reporter gave it a mixed review, and called it "A low-impact romantic comedy-drama from James L. Brooks in which the central characters are strangely disconnected from one another as well as from the audience." Peter Debruge of Variety gave it a negative review, and wrote: "How do you know when the spark is gone? When your latest romantic comedy looks like TV, feels like greeting-card poetry, and sounds like a self-help manual." Roger Ebert of the Chicago Sun-Times wrote: "Nothing heats up. The movie doesn't lead us, it simply stays in step."

Richard Corliss of Time noted that the film had already received particularly negative reviews, but responded: "Yeah, well, I still like the film."
