= Paul Dubov =

American actor and screenwriter (1918–1979)

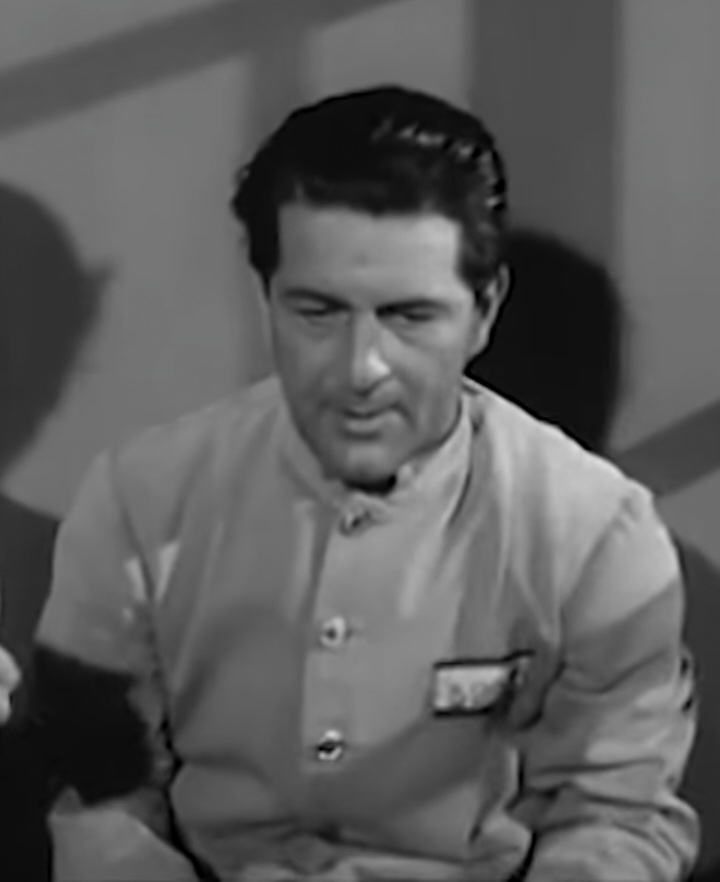
- Dubov in Ma Barker's Killer Brood (1960)
- Born: October 10, 1918
- Died: September 20, 1979 (aged 60); Encino, California, U.S.
- Resting place: Hillside Memorial Park Cemetery, Culver City, California
- Occupations: Actor, screenwriter
- Years active: 1938–1977
- Notable work: 1965–1966 series Honey West
- Spouse: Gwen Bagni (m. 1963)

Paul Dubov (October 10, 1918 – September 20, 1979) was an American radio, film and television actor as well as screenwriter. He frequently appeared in the works of Sam Fuller.

== Biography ==
Dubov's radio credits include the 05/02/1953 episode of Gunsmoke entitled "Tacetta". Dubov became a screenwriter and often worked with his wife, Gwen Bagni (1913–2001), whom he married in 1963. The couple co-developed the 1965–66 series Honey West, starring Anne Francis, and wrote scripts for the series from which it was a spin off, Burke's Law starring Gene Barry. Both series were on ABC-TV and produced by Four Star Television.

Another television role as an actor included Federal Agent and wiretap specialist Jack Rossman in the original pilot episode of ABC-TV's The Untouchables, starring Robert Stack, which was later released into theaters as The Scarface Mob. For the series his role was taken over by Steve London.

Dubnov's television appearances included roles on Perry Mason, That Girl starring Marlo Thomas, Hawaiian Eye, Stoney Burke starring Jack Lord, Gunsmoke starring James Arness, The Bill Dana Show, Arrest and Trial, Make Room for Daddy, Bat Masterson, 77 Sunset Strip, Bonanza, Surfside Six, The Cara Williams Show, and many more.

He died September 20, 1979, in Encino, California. He was buried in Hillside Memorial Park Cemetery, Culver City, California.

== Partial filmography ==
- Little Tough Guy (1938) – Chuck (uncredited)
- Secrets of a Nurse (1938) – Newspaper Vendor (uncredited)
- Appointment for Love (1941) – Blake (uncredited)
- Bombay Clipper (1942) – News Photographer (uncredited)
- North to the Klondike (1942) – Piety Smith
- Girls' Town (1942) – Lionel Fontaine
- The Mystery of Marie Roget (1942) – Pierre, News Vendor (uncredited)
- Escape from Hong Kong (1942) – Franz Schuler
- Danger in the Pacific (1942) – Manola
- Who Done It? (1942) – Radio Actor (uncredited)
- The Boss of Big Town (1942) – Graham
- Mug Town (1942) – Waiter (uncredited)
- The Adventures of Smilin' Jack (1943, Serial) – Mandonese Man [Chs. 2–3] (uncredited)
- It Ain't Hay (1943) – Tout (uncredited)
- Don Winslow of the Coast Guard (1943, Serial) – Coast Guardsman [Ch. 3] (uncredited)
- Follow the Band (1943) – Alphonse (uncredited)
- We've Never Been Licked (1943) – Student (uncredited)
- Strange Holiday (1945) – Second Detective
- The Set-Up (1949) – Gambler (uncredited)
- Champion (1949) – Gangster (uncredited)
- Outside the Wall (1950) – Stick-Up Man (uncredited)
- Young Man with a Horn (1950) – Maxie (uncredited)
- Perfect Strangers (1950) – Vonderheit (uncredited)
- Triple Trouble (1950) – Pretty Boy Gleason
- The Killer That Stalked New York (1950) – Intern, Phil (uncredited)
- Cyrano de Bergerac (1950) – Cadet
- The Flying Missile (1950) – Army Lieutenant (uncredited)
- Missing Women (1951) – Mechanic (uncredited)
- Her First Romance (1951) – Camp Counsellor (uncredited)
- The Mob (1951) – Johnson – Mobile Unit #3 Man (uncredited)
- Sunny Side of the Street (1951) – Miller – Studio Page (uncredited)
- The Family Secret (1951) – Deputy District Attorney (uncredited)
- Red Skies of Montana (1952) – Doctor (uncredited)
- The Sniper (1952) – Barfly (uncredited)
- Deadline – U.S.A. (1952) – Mac, Photographer (uncredited)
- High Noon (1952) – Scott (uncredited)
- Kansas City Confidential (1952) – Eddie (uncredited)
- I, the Jury (1953) – Marty
- The Glass Web (1953) – Man (uncredited)
- The Long Wait (1954) – Chuck (uncredited)
- The Last Time I Saw Paris (1954) – Helen's Escort (uncredited)
- The Atomic Kid (1954) – Anderson (uncredited)
- The Silver Chalice (1954) – Jabez – Roman Magistrate (uncredited)
- Six Bridges to Cross (1955) – Bandit Leader (uncredited)
- Abbott and Costello Meet the Keystone Kops (1955) – Jason – Plane Pilot (uncredited)
- Cell 2455, Death Row (1955) – Al
- Mad at the World (1955) – Jamie Allison
- Jump Into Hell (1955) – Medic (uncredited)
- Apache Woman (1955) – Ben Hunter
- Day the World Ended (1955) – Radek
- That Certain Feeling (1956) – Hal Kern, TV Director (uncredited)
- The She Creature (1956) – Johnny
- He Laughed Last (1956) – Billy Boy Barnes (uncredited)
- Shake, Rattle & Rock (1956) – Bugsy Smith
- Gunsmoke (1956 & 1957) – Humbert & Pritchard (TV series)
- Guns Don't Argue (1957) – Alvin Karpis (archive footage)
- Voodoo Woman (1957) – Marcel Chateau
- China Gate (1957) – Capt. Caumont
- The Brothers Rico (1957) – Phil
- Forty Guns (1957) – Judge Macy
- Tokyo After Dark (1959) – Jesse Bronson
- Verboten! (1959) – Capt. R. Harvey
- The Crimson Kimono (1959) – Casale
- The Atomic Submarine (1959) – Lt. David Milburn
- The Purple Gang (1959) – Thomas Allen aka Killer Burke
- Wanted Dead or Alive (1960)
- Underworld U.S.A. (1961) – Gela
- Bat Masterson (1961) – Tom Fulton
- The Comancheros (1961)
- The Underwater City (1962) – George Burnett
- Irma la Douce (1963) – Andre
- Shock Corridor (1963) – Dr. J.L. Menkin
- Crash! (1977) – Dr. Cross (final film role)
