= I Married a Monster from Outer Space =

1958 film by Gene Fowler Jr.

- Theatrical release poster
- Directed by: Gene Fowler Jr.
- Written by: Louis Vittes
- Produced by: Gene Fowler Jr.
- Starring: Tom Tryon; Gloria Talbott
- Cinematography: Haskell Boggs
- Edited by: George Tomasini
- Music by: Van Cleave (uncredited); Daniele Amfitheatrof (uncredited); Hugo Friedhofer (uncredited); Leith Stevens (uncredited); Franz Waxman (uncredited); Victor Young (uncredited)
- Color process: Black and white
- Production company: Paramount Pictures
- Distributed by: Paramount Pictures
- Release date: September 10, 1958
- Running time: 78 minutes
- Country: United States
- Language: English
- Budget: $125,000

I Married a Monster from Outer Space is a 1958 American horror science fiction film from Paramount Pictures, produced and directed by Gene Fowler Jr., that stars Tom Tryon, Ty Hardin and Gloria Talbott. Paramount released the film on September 10, 1958 as a double feature with The Blob (1958).

The film's storyline concerns Marge Farrell, a young wife who begins to realize that her husband is not the man he was before they married, and ultimately discovers he is actually an alien humanoid.

== Plot ==
After a year of marriage, Marge Farrell is despondent that her husband Bill is cold and not acting toward her the way he did before they were married. He does not show any signs of genuine affection towards her or toward his new dog, a surprise anniversary present from Marge. The dog barks and snarls at him whenever he approaches. He kills it in their basement, telling Marge the dog was strangled by his collar while pulling on his tethered leash. She is also becoming concerned because, wanting a family, she has not become pregnant. After undergoing various tests, her doctor assures her that she can have children; he suggests that Bill come in and see him to be tested.

She soon notices that other husbands in their social circle are acting the same way. One night, she follows Bill when he goes out for a long walk. He heads to an isolated area in the woods, where she discovers that he is not the man she thought she married but an alien impostor. An extraterrestrial life form leaves Bill's body shell and then enters a hidden spaceship.

Marge is horrified at the prospect and tries to warn others of the alien plot, but too many men in town have already been taken over, including the town's Chief of Police, who does nothing after hearing her story. She attempts to call Washington, D.C., but all outgoing phone lines are busy. She attempts to leave by car and the local police stop her, saying that the only exit bridge which leads out of town is down. When she tells “Bill” that she knows he is an alien, “Bill” tells her their plan: all the females on his planet are extinct. He and the other males of his species are taking over human bodies so they can have offspring with Earth women. However, their scientists must modify the bodies for this purpose. They did not foresee that the memories of the host bodies would result in them experiencing love for the first time (their species, unaccustomed to forming emotional relationships, used their females only for breeding purposes).

Marge finally convinces her doctor, and he gathers a posse of men who recently fathered children and therefore cannot be disguised aliens. They attack the aliens in their hidden spaceship. Bullets cannot hurt the invaders, who are surrounded by a force barrier. The aliens, however, prove to be defenseless against a pair of German Shepherds being used by the posse. The aliens are killed when the dogs attack, all except the alien posing as Bill. One dog and a posse member are disintegrated by the alien's rayguns during the fight.

Entering the spaceship, the posse finds that all the human male captives are unconscious but still alive, including Bill. Each man is hooked up to an apparatus that keeps them alive, while a duplicate “shell” is created for an alien to inhabit. The posse begins to disconnect the captives, which kills the aliens one-by-one. Shortly before his faux human body is destroyed, the alien occupying the Chief of Police broadcasts a warning to his people in orbit that they have been discovered by the humans. Thereafter, a fleet of alien spaceships is seen leaving orbit. They must seek out humanoid females elsewhere now that their breeding plan on Earth has been discovered. The humans that were disconnected from the ship are escorted out of the ship alive just before it explodes, reuniting Marge with the real Bill.

== Cast ==
- Tom Tryon as Bill Farrell
- Gloria Talbott as Marge Bradley Farrell
- Peter Baldwin as Officer Frank Swanson
- Robert Ivers as Harry Phillips
- Chuck Wassil as Ted Hanks
- Valerie Allen as Francine, a Hooker
- Ty Hardin as Mac Brody (credited as Ty Hungerford)
- Ken Lynch as Dr. Wayne
- John Eldredge as Police Captain H.B. Collins
- Alan Dexter as Sam Benson
- James Anderson as Weldon
- Jean Carson as Helen Alexander Benson
- Jack Orrison as Officer Schultz
- Steve London as Charles Mason
- Max "Slapsie Maxie" Rosenbloom as Max Grady, the bartender
- Tony Di Milo as Mr. Potter, Western Union Clerk (uncredited)
- Darlene Fields as Caroline Hanks (uncredited)
- Bess Flowers as Wedding Guest (uncredited)
- Charles Gemora as Alien (uncredited)
- Joe Gray as Alien (uncredited)
- Helen Jay as Second Girl (uncredited)
- Arthur Lovejoy as Minister (uncredited)
- Ralph Manza as Ralph the Waiter (uncredited)
- Harold Miller as Wedding Guest (uncredited)
- Scherry Staiger as Blond in Bar (uncredited)
- Mary Treen as Mother Bradley (uncredited)

== Production ==
Trailer for film

Both director Gene Fowler Jr. and screenwriter Louis Vittes had worked in series television and had some success. With I Married a Monster from Outer Space, both had some creative freedom, although Vittes was notoriously resistant to any changes to his script, to the annoyance of the leads. Principal photography for I Married a Monster from Outer Space began on April 21 and ended in early May 1958. The film marked Fowler's second directorial effort following I Was a Teenage Werewolf (1957). Prior to this, Fowler had worked closely as an editor for Fritz Lang.

== Release ==
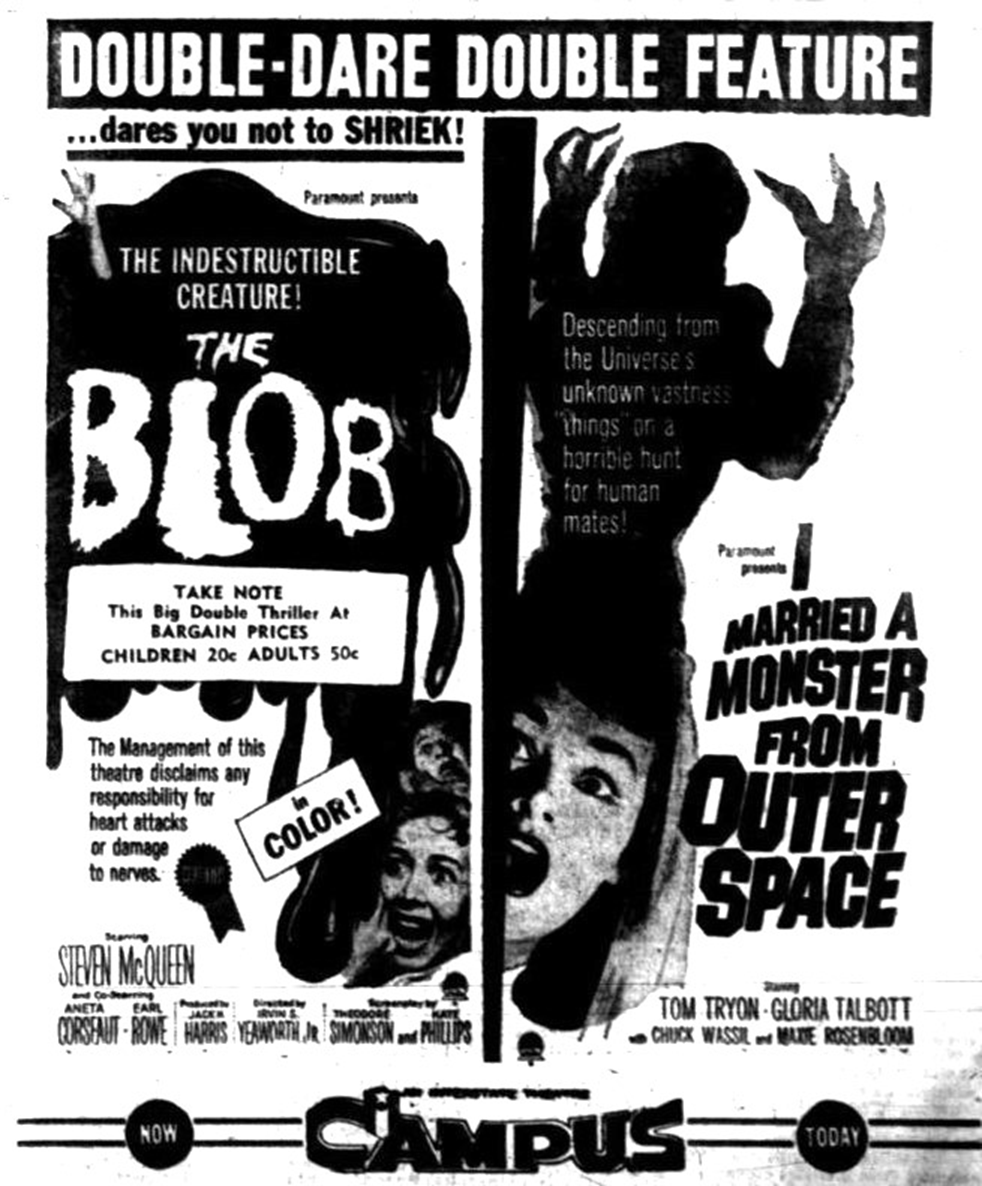
Advertisement from 1958 for I Married a Monster from Outer Space and co-feature, The Blob.

On September 10, 1958, the film premiered in Los Angeles, followed by its U.S. and Canadian theatrical release on September 29, 1958. It was released on a double feature with The Blob (1958).)

=== Critical response ===
Upon its release, I Married a Monster from Outer Space proved to be a hit with audiences and critics. Despite its modest budget and unpretentious production values, the film was ideal filler for drive-in audiences. Originally slated as the A film in a double feature with The Blob (1958), I Married a Monster from Outer Space was relegated to the bottom of the playbill because audiences preferred the intriguing full color monster feature over this monochromatic, more sombre, domestic invasion entry.

Due to its exploitative and sensationalized title, I Married a Monster from Outer Space has long been ignored by critics and film historians, although it received respectable reviews, both in contemporary and in later reviews. Variety's 1958 review wrote, "Fowler's direction, while sometimes slow, latches onto mounting suspense as action moves to climax. He gets the benefit of outstanding special photographic effects from John P. Fulton, which aid in maintaining interest." Harrison's Reports declared, "This latest addition to the current cycle of science-fiction-horror melodramas is just as fantastic as the others in its category, but it is more imaginative than most and should prove to be a good supporting feature wherever such pictures are acceptable." The Monthly Film Bulletin of Britain wrote, "This generally well-acted and -staged Science Fiction thriller, though novelettish in its personal story, has an intriguing situation and some effective, if rather sparse, trick camerawork." Danny Peary described it as "an intelligent, atmospheric, subtly made sci-fi thriller". Tom Milne of Time Out magazine found "good performances, strikingly moody camerawork, a genuinely exciting climax", and Leonard Maltin called it a "pretty good little rehash of Invasion of the Body Snatchers" with "some nice, creepy moments".

== Home media ==
In 2004 Paramount released a DVD of the film which, other than the open matte, full frame (1.33:1) format of the 1998 VHS release, cropped the original 1:85:1 image to the modern 16:9 (1.78:1) TV aspect ratio.

The label L'Atelier 13 released a Spanish language DVD under the title Me casé con un monstruo del espacio exterior.

In 2020, the film was released on Blu-ray through the Australian label Imprint.

In 2023, Shout! Factory released a "double feature" Blu-ray, which also included Conquest of Space.

== Themes ==
The Aurum Film Encyclopedia concluded that "while the film was clearly fueled by the Cold War mentality of the fifties, in retrospect it is its sexual politics that are more interesting, and disturbing". The hint at a subtext of "sexual angst" by Tom Milne is emphasized by German critic Georg Seeßlen, linking I Married a Monster from Outer Space and Attack of the 50 Foot Woman (1958) to film noir: Their subjects in common, states Seeßlen, are the distrust between the sexes and the depiction of marriage as a trap where the death of one partner seems inevitable. Sex is referenced continuously throughout the film, notes Cranny-Francis, and although the audience is aware alien–human coupling has occurred, the aliens fail when they cannot impregnate Earth women.

Film scholar Harry M. Benshoff suggests that the film features a blatant subtext of male homosexuality, citing the lead character of Bill's preference to "meet other strange men in the public park" rather than stay at home with his wife.

== Remake ==
In 1998 the now defunct UPN television network produced and aired a remake of the film titled I Married a Monster, with Richard Burgi as the alien husband.

== Bibliography ==
- Benshoff, Harry M. (1997). Monsters in the Closet: Homosexuality and the Horror Film. Manchester: Manchester University Press. ISBN 978-0-719-04473-1.
- Cranny-Francis, Anne (2016). "Robots, Androids, Aliens and Others: the Erotics and Politics of Science Fiction Film". In Redmond, Sean; Marvell, Leon Marvell (eds.). Endangering Science Fiction Film. New York: Routledge. pp. 220–242. ISBN 978-1-315-76188-6.
- Hardy, Phil, ed. (1991). The Aurum Film Encyclopedia: Science Fiction. London: Aurum Press. ISBN 978-0-68800-842-0.
- Lee, Michael (2008). "Ideology and Style in the Double Feature I Married A Monster from Outer Space and The Curse of the Demon". In Rhodes, Gary Don (ed.). Horror at the Drive-in: Essays in Popular Americana. Jefferson, North Carolina: McFarland. ISBN 978-0-78643-762-7.
- Maltin, Leonard (2009). Leonard Maltin's Movie Guide 2009. New York: New American Library. ISBN 978-0-451-22468-2.
- Milne, Tom, ed. (1998). Time Out Film Guide, Seventh Edition 1999. London: Penguin. ISBN 0-141-01354-0.
- Peary, Danny (1981). Cult Movies: The Classics, the Sleepers, the Weird, and the Wonderful. New York: Dell Publishing. ISBN 978-0-09154-441-6.
- Seeßlen, Georg (1980). Kino des Utopischen. Geschichte und Mythologie des Science-fiction-Films (in German). Hamburg: Rowohlt, Reinbek bei. ISBN 3-49917-334-4.
- Warren, Bill (1986). Keep Watching The Skies Vol. II: 1958-1962. Jefferson, North Carolina: McFarland. ISBN 0-89950-032-3.
