= List of The Untouchables (1959 TV series) episodes =

This is a list of episodes for the 1959–1963 television series The Untouchables, starring Robert Stack as Eliot Ness.

== Series overview ==
Season	Episodes	Originally released	
Season	Episodes	First released	Last released
Pilot		April 20, 1959	April 27, 1959
1	28	October 15, 1959	April 28, 1960
2	32	October 13, 1960	June 8, 1961
3	28	October 12, 1961	July 5, 1962
4	30	September 25, 1962	May 21, 1963

== Episodes ==
=== Pilot (1959) ===
Title	Directed by	Written by	Original release date
The Scarface Mob	Phil Karlson	Paul Monash	April 20, 1959
The Scarface Mob	Phil Karlson	Paul Monash	April 27, 1959
In 1929 Chicago, Federal investigator Eliot Ness struggles in the fight against Al Capone. He decides to form a special team of reliable, dedicated, honest law enforcement officers.

=== Season 1 (1959–60) ===
No. overall	No. in season	Title	Directed by	Written by	Original release date
1	1	"The Empty Chair"	John Peyser	David Karp & Ernest Kinoy	October 15, 1959
With Capone in prison, Frank Nitti tries to grab the open top spot in the empire. But Capone's bookkeeper is giving him a run for his money. Untouchables agent "Rico" Rossi is introduced in this episode, as a barber-turned-federal agent who was a witness to Frank Nitti's murder of two top Capone lieutenants.
2	2	"Ma Barker and Her Boys"	Joe Parker	Jerome Ross	October 22, 1959
Ness has tracked down the notorious bank robber Ma Barker, a woman who turned her back on religion in order to lead a life of crime with her sons.
3	3	"The Jake Lingle Killing"	Tay Garnett	Robert C. Dennis & Saul Levitt	October 29, 1959
A newspaperman is murdered for double-crossing some mobsters. So a reward-seeking ex-con decides to work with Ness and find the killer.
4	4	"The George 'Bugs' Moran Story"	Joe Parker	David Karp	November 5, 1959
Ness tries to get the influential president of a truckers union to stop mobster "Bugs" Moran and his crime syndicate from infiltrating the labor unions.
5	5	"Ain't We Got Fun"	Roger Kay	Robert C. Dennis & Abram S. Ginnes	November 12, 1959
A successful bootlegger seizes control of a nightclub and takes its brash young comic under his wing, promising to make him a star.
6	6	"Vincent 'Mad Dog' Coll"	Andrew McCullough	Charles R. Marion & Palmer Thompson	November 19, 1959
A deranged gangster kidnaps the right-hand man of mobster Dutch Schultz, then steals the horse Schultz was planning to bet on in the Kentucky Derby.
7	7	"Mexican Stake-Out"	Tay Garnett	Robert C. Dennis & Alvin Sapinsley	November 26, 1959
Eliot Ness is lured south of the border to retrieve a witness who will help his case. Only it's a set-up... once there, the mobster on trial is planning to have Ness killed.
8	8	"The Artichoke King"	Roger Kay	Harry Essex	December 3, 1959
A gangster who controls the produce market in New York has a colleague bumped off. But when the hit man he hired gets greedy, he has to get rid of him too.
9	9	"The Tri-State Gang"	Allen H. Miner	Joseph Petracca	December 10, 1959
A notorious gang that hijacks trucks is unstoppable... until one of its members falls for a young French woman who can identify their leader. Untouchables agent LaMarr Kane (Chuck Hicks) is killed in this episode.
10	10	"The Dutch Schultz Story"	Jerry Hopper	Robert C. Dennis & Jerome Ross	December 17, 1959
After Dutch Schultz gets his income tax evasion trial moved to a quiet town, he starts to have a positive effect on its citizens and eventually sways the jury.
11	11	"You Can't Pick the Number"	Richard Whorf	Henry F. Greenberg	December 24, 1959
Eliot Ness and the Untouchables set their sights shutting down the numbers racket. The numbers are like a lottery where anyone can place a bet of up to one dollar on a three digit number. The payout for a full dollar bet is $600 so the profit for the mob, who run the racket, is the remaining 40%. Ness wants to shut down that cash flow which can be used for more heinous crimes. They think they may have an in when one of Al Morrissey's collectors is stabbed. Ness pressures Agent Marty Flaherty to make contact with Morrissey, an old friend who once saved his life. Before he can do anything, the Chicago police arrest Morrissey for gambling violations and Marty focuses on Al's son, Phil Morrissey but with little luck until his father pays the price for being connected to the mob.
12	12	"The Underground Railway"	Walter Grauman	Leonard Kantor	December 31, 1959
When Frank Halloway breaks out of prison, his crooked lawyer arranges for him to follow the underground railway to Los Angeles where he hopes to collect his $250,000 share of the loot from his last job. The so-called railway is a safe route to Los Angeles with help from reliable criminal associates along the way. To help him along the way, the lawyer arranges for Mona Valentine to travel with him and pose as his wife. She does so for the money she's offered, even though she is repulsed by Halloway who is quite ugly. Along the way, however, he undergoes plastic surgery to the point that it creates a problem for him at the end of his journey. For Eliot Ness and the Untouchables, capturing Halloway is personal: Halloway killed a fellow agent.
13	13	"Syndicate Sanctuary"	Paul Harrison	George F. Slavin	January 7, 1960
With Al Capone out of the way, the mob is looking to relocate its base of operations outside of Chicago in a nearby community. Their first step is to get rid of the incorruptible mayoral candidate, Judge Leon Zabo, who they run down in the street. The Coroner's inquest is a sham and it is obvious that the Chief of Police, who appoints the Coroner, is already in the syndicate's pocket. Ness and his men move into the town intent on shutting the mob down before they even get started but the Untouchables find that they also have to protect the dead Judge's daughter, Rosetta Zabo, who has taken up his anti-corruption campaign.
14	14	"The Noise of Death"	Walter Grauman	Ben Maddow	January 14, 1960
When Eliot Ness and Agent Martin Flaherty raid a small butcher shop looking for illegal liquor, they find more the cheap booze: they find the body of the store's owner, Arturo Vittorini, in the meat locker. The dead man's wife Barbara accuses the neighborhood Mafia chief, Joe Bucco, of ordering the killing. Bucco denies having anything to do with it -- the dead man was his wife's cousin -- but is pretty sure his collector, Little Charlie Sebastino, is responsible. He also learns to his shock and dismay that the Mafia hierarchy has pushed him out and Little Charlie has been named as his replacement. Bucco strikes back and sabotages Sebastino's trucks but the Mafia sends him a message when they kill his driver and he knows that unless he backs off, he will be next. He gives Eliot Ness a present just in case he's knocked off.
15	15	"Star Witness"	Tay Garnett	Charles O'Neal	January 21, 1960
An accountant with a brilliant mind for numbers agrees to testify against the mob. But keeping him safe before the trial keeps Ness and his men on the run.
16	16	"The St. Louis Story"	Howard W. Koch	Joseph Petracca	January 28, 1960
The team faces a new kind of criminal when they battle the owner of the swank Jockey Club, a respectable gent who is the boss of the St. Louis underworld.
17	17	"One-Armed Bandits"	Walter Grauman	E. Jack Neuman	February 4, 1960
A newly released convict is blackmailed into running a slot-machine racket. If he refuses, his daughter will learn of his existence and be scandalized.
18	18	"Little Egypt"	John Peyser	Joseph Petracca	February 11, 1960
The department's newest agent is able to infiltrate the mob, using carrier pigeons to get information out. That is, until a woman gets him into trouble. Guest Stars: Fred Clark and Susan Cummings. Season one regular Anthony George (Untouchables agent Cam Allison) is also billed as a guest star.
19	19	"The Big Squeeze"	Roger Kay	W.R. Burnett & Robert C. Dennis	February 18, 1960
For Ness, a master bank robber proves a worthy opponent. But robbing banks is not a federal offense, so Ness must get him on another charge.
20	20	"The Unhired Assassin: Part 1"	Howard W. Koch	William Spier	February 25, 1960
While a crazed derelict in Florida is obsessed with assassinating President Roosevelt, Capone's mob is planning to take over the Chicago World's Fair by killing the mayor.
21	21	"The Unhired Assassin: Part 2"	Howard W. Koch	William Spier	March 3, 1960
Although unsuccessful in their first attempt to assassinate Chicago's Mayor, Anton J. Cermak, the Capone mob under the command of Frank Nitti and several other of the imprisoned mobster's lieutenants, have not given up. This time they hire a professional, Fred "Caddy" Croner, an expert at using a long rifle with a scope who carries his weapon in a golf club bag. They put him on a retainer until Cermak goes out of town and sure enough, they learn that the Mayor will be traveling to Miami to attend a public event in honor of the President-elect, Franklin Delano Roosevelt, who is visiting the area before returning to Washington for his inauguration a few weeks later. Eliot Ness and the Untouchables are soon onto their plan and travel to Miami to protect Cermak. Unbeknown to them however, a crazed man, Giuseppe "Joe" Zangara, has purchased a handgun with the intent to kill Roosevelt at the same public function.
22	22	"The White Slavers"	Walter Grauman	Leonard Kantor	March 10, 1960
The sadistic head of a prostitution ring tries to get a former madam to help him with his operation. Only she decides to work with Eliot Ness instead.
23	23	"Three Thousand Suspects"	John Peyser	Robert C. Dennis	March 24, 1960
Just as a prisoner is about to turn stool pigeon, he is shot by someone on the inside. So Ness transfers a con from another prison to find the killer.
24	24	"The Doreen Maney Story"	Robert Florey	Jerome Ross	March 31, 1960
A woman and her boyfriend, dubbed "The Lovebirds" by the press, rob an armored truck. When she is caught, Ness uses her as bait to catch her partner.
25	25	"Portrait of a Thief"	Walter Grauman	Herbert Abbott Spiro	April 7, 1960
The president of a firm that distributes alcohol is connected to the mob and has been swindling his company for years. But then the mob turns on him.
26	26	"The Underworld Bank"	Stuart Rosenberg	Aben Kandel	April 14, 1960
The crime lords have now become money lenders. So when they cut one of their men out of his share of a heist, he comes after them... and so does Eliot Ness.
27	27	"Head of Fire: Feet of Clay"	Walter Grauman	Ben Maddow	April 21, 1960
Special agent Ness is worried about his childhood pal -- a big, successful boxing promoter who's mixed up with a gangster Ness can never get convicted.
28	28	"The Frank Nitti Story"	Howard W. Koch	Lee Blair & Harry Essex	April 28, 1960
Al Capone's main enforcer, Frank Nitti, has gone into the movie business. He threatens theater owners into paying him protection money... or else! Untouchables agent Cam Allison (Anthony George) is killed in this episode, using his body to shield Ness from a would-be assassin.

=== Season 2 (1960–61) ===
No. overall	No. in season	Title	Directed by	Written by	Original release date
29	1	"The Rusty Heller Story"	Walter Grauman	Leonard Kantor	October 13, 1960
Rusty Heller is a nightclub performer who has her eyes set on a better life for herself which, in her case, means lots more money. She sets her eyes on mobster Charles 'Pop' Felcher who has his own ambitions: with the recent arrest of Al Capone on tax evasion charges, he sees himself taking over as the top mobster in Chicago. When Felcher shows little interest in her, she settles for his lawyer, Archie Grayson. Felcher eventually comes around but Rusty starts to play a dangerous game when she decides to make money off Felcher and the Capone mob by selling both of them the same information. Paul Picerni joins the cast as new Untouchables Agent Lee Hobson, replacing Martin Flaherty (Jerry Paris) as Ness' second-in-command. Elizabeth Montgomery (as Rusty) and her Bewitched co-star David White guest-star Note: In 1997 TV Guide ranked this episode number 99 on its "100 Greatest Episodes of All Time" list.
30	2	"Jack 'Legs' Diamond"	John Peyser	Story by : Harry Essex; Teleplay by : Charles O'Neal	October 20, 1960
Working in the New York area, Eliot Ness and his men are trying to trace an incoming shipment of narcotics. Some years before, mobster and nightclub owner Jack "Legs" Diamond spent time in Europe and he made a deal with a Greek crime family to buy $5 million worth of narcotics. Diamond is flamboyant and loves publicity but his partners, Lucky Luciano and Dutch Schultz, want him to lie low for a while and they send him off to his cabin in the Catskills. When Diamond learns that they have gone ahead with the drug deal without informing him, he assumes they're trying to cut him out of the deal and goes after the drugs himself.
31	3	"Nicky"	Walter Grauman	Story by : Joseph Petracca; Teleplay by : Joseph Petracca & Harry Essex	November 3, 1960
When a small-time hoodlum is apparently killed by Eliot Ness during a raid, the man's teenage son, Nicky Bousso, tries to kill him. Ness realizes that Nicky is no hood and tries to be nice, but the kid is persistent. When ballistics confirm that the man was killed before the raid took place, Nicky thinks Ness is just making it up. Nicky gets a job cleaning cars at his father's former place of work, a taxi company owned by Gus Marco. Unbeknown to Nicky, Marco is a major hoodlum and his father was in fact a hood. He is soon faced with the choice of following in his father's footsteps or helping out Ness and the Feds.
32	4	"The Waxey Gordon Story"	John Peyser	Joseph Petracca	November 10, 1960
Waxey Gordon is known as the beer baron of New York and he decides that the time has come to expand his territory. He sets his sights on the New Jersey side of the river and successfully eliminates his three competitors there, including mobster Bugs Donovan. Ness and his men are trying to bring Waxey down and are sure they have located his warehouse but every time they raid the place, the building is completely empty. When they do finally figure out how he is moving his beer, they plan a little surprise for him with the help of the Elizabeth, New Jersey Fire Department.
33	5	"The Mark of Cain"	Walter Grauman	David Zelag Goodman	November 17, 1960
Eliot Ness and his team have been successful in shutting most of the drug trafficking in Chicago. One exception is "Little" Charlie Sebastino's operation. He has accumulated quite a stash over the years and doesn't need to import new supplies to keep his lucrative operation going. A drug overdose victim puts Ness onto Sebastino's distribution chain but he is puzzled when the gangster stops selling the stuff. Unbeknown to Ness, the Commission, chaired by Joe Genna, has ordered Sebastino to stop selling drugs. Needless to say, "Little" Charlie hatches his own plan to eliminate Genna and come out on top.
34	6	"A Seat on the Fence"	Walter Grauman	William Templeton	November 24, 1960
Narcotics smuggler Dino Patrone returns to the United States after visiting the old country for several months. He brings his younger sister Carla with him as she plans on studying in the U.S. Little does Dino know that his boss Victor Bardo has ordered his best friend Willie Asher to kill him. Traveling on the train to Chicago, Dino meets an acquaintance, print and radio journalist Loren Hall. Dino soon meets his end and it falls to Hall, who reluctantly agrees to work with Eliot Ness, to help Carla Patrone after she is kidnapped by the mobsters.
35	7	"The Purple Gang"	Walter Grauman	John Mantley	December 1, 1960
The Purple Gang, led by Eddie Fletcher, specialize in small-time kidnapping focusing on minor mobster that can fetch them a few thousand dollars in a short time. They may have bitten off than they can chew when they grab Jan Tornek. He is ostensibly an antique shop owner in business with his brother-in-law Eric Vajda. In fact, he's a messenger for the Capone mob, regularly collecting shipments of narcotics. Ness had been observing Tornek for some time and when he misses picking up a drug delivery, he's soon on to Mrs. Tornek who has already received the ransom demand. She works with Ness but Fletcher is soon on to them and they nab her brother, Eric Vajda. The case gets complicated when Capone's top enforcer, Frank Nitti, starts to negotiate for Vajda's release.
36	8	"Kiss of Death Girl"	John Peyser	Harry Kronman	December 8, 1960
Having had three boyfriends killed in the last 18 months, Francie West has earned her nickname, the kiss of death girl. She is a blackjack dealer in Phil Corbin's speakeasy and has been dating a minor mobster in Lou Scalese organization named Whitey Barrows. Corbin has plans to move into the big time and with Whitey's help, hijacks four truckloads of liquor belonging to Scalese. Corbin kills Whitey when the job is done and Eliot Ness tries to get Francie to help him out on the case. She's not too keen, initially refusing to accept that her latest boyfriend is dead. When she realizes that Corbin was involved and that her own life is in danger, she reconsiders.
37	9	"The Larry Fay Story"	Walter Grauman	Harry Essex	December 15, 1960
When mobster Larry Fay (Sam Levene) gets control of the dairy industry, the price goes up and the city is in an uproar. Milk normally sells for 10 cents a quart but has risen to 13 cents with 2 cents going directly into 's Fay's pocket. A commission of inquiry is set up to investigate the matter but Fay only cares about his profit and to the chagrin of at least one of his partners, pushes the price of milk ever higher. Fay owns a nightclub with partner Sally Kansas who isn't aware of Fay's illegal activities. Her much adored younger brother Tommy does and when Fay kills him, Eliot Ness sees an opening to enlist Sally's help in bringing Fay down.
38	10	"The Otto Frick Story"	John Peyser	Leonard Kantor	December 22, 1960
Otto Frick is a drug dealer with a traveling group of distributors. Ness and his men trace his supply chain to a book shop whose owner regularly visits the German Consulate in New York. Ness soon realizes that the Nazis are supplying Frick and that one of its agents, Walter Messlinger, is the point of contact. What Ness doesn't yet realize is that Messlinger wants Frick's experience as a hood to start using Nazi strong-arm tactics against local citizens. He also enlists Frick's right-hand man, Hans Eberhardt, to set up a protection racket against Jewish shopkeepers. When Ness intercepts one of the German drug shipments, Frick starts putting pressure on his German contact and it all comes to a head on the night of big German-American Bund rally at Madison Square Gardens.
39	11	"The Tommy Karpeles Story"	Stuart Rosenberg	George Bellak	December 29, 1960
Following the Hillsdale Express train robbery in which a million dollars was stolen and a mail clerk was killed, "Tough" Tommy Karpeles is convicted and sentenced to life in prison. Eliot Ness has been tasked by the Post Office to recover the missing million and he begins to think that Karpeles may be innocent. Information from a dying hood puts him on the trail of Karpeles' former associate Arnie 'The Wolf' Mendoza, now a supposedly reformed cinema owner living under the name of Albert Maris. When Mendoza kidnaps Karpeles' daughter Sally to keep her from talking, Tommy decides to help Ness and rescue his daughter.
40	12	"The Big Train: Part 1"	John Peyser	William Spier	January 5, 1961
When Al Capone is convicted of tax evasion, he's sentenced to 11 years and sent to the federal penitentiary in Atlanta. Capone's farewell is something normally reserved for more honest citizens leading Eliot Ness to go to Washington and propose the construction of Alcatraz prison. In Atlanta, Capone has a pretty good thing going, including guards who make life pretty easy for him in exchange for cash. When it becomes apparent that he too will be transferred to the new prison, Capone uses a cell mate's knowledge of the railroad route to plan his escape. In Chicago meanwhile, Ness becomes aware that the Capone empire is converting assets into cash and he and his team set out to find out why.
41	13	"The Big Train: Part 2"	John Peyser	William Spier	January 12, 1961
Having managed to secretly inform his men of the departure date of the train carrying him to Alcatraz, Al Capone continues to work om his escape. The plan is to free Capone when the train stops for 5 minutes in the northern California community of Cloverville. Capone's men arrive the day before the snatch and basically take over the town at gunpoint. Ness and his men are soon on to them however and manage to enter the town. Needless to say, Capone ends up in Alcatraz.
42	14	"The Masterpiece"	Walter Grauman	David Zelag Goodman	January 19, 1961
When Al Capone is imprisoned for tax evasion, he leaves his operation in the hands of two of his lieutenants: Mayer Wartel is responsible for the speakeasies and Carl Positan is left in charge of the breweries. Wartel however soon ensures that he is left as the only one in charge and is soon dubbed Capone's heir apparent. He's a severe hypochondriac and a chronic worrier so when he takes a dislike to the newspaper articles about him, he personally gets rid of the editor. Wartel had his gun made from scratch and of unique lightweight materials which results in Ness being able to track down the gunsmith and keep him under surveillance. When worrier Wartel gets wind of Ness' interest, he hires contract killer Harry Strauss to get rid of him. The fact that his target is under constant watch only adds to thrill of the kill.
43	15	"The Organization"	Walter Grauman	Harry Kronman	January 26, 1961
With the imprisonment of Al Capone for tax evasion, Frank Nitti has taken over the operation of the organization but that isn't stopping others from trying to muscle their way in. Arnie Seeger in particular thinks he has the opportunity to create a national crime syndicate and partners with St. Louis mobster Joe Kulak to make it happen. They plan on inviting key mobsters from across the country to a conference in Chicago. Into this mix comes a recently released small-time criminal, Maxie Schram. His wife Roxie now lives with Seeger and Maxie tries to hit her up for money. Down and out, he has no choice but to turn to Eliot Ness as an informant after his wife refuses to help him. It is Maxie that puts Ness and his men on Seeger's trail. When Kulak kills a policeman who had wiretapped the site of the syndicate conference, theirs is now a murder investigation as well.
44	16	"The Jamaica Ginger Story"	John Peyser	Joseph Petracca	February 2, 1961
Kansas City boss Torrez runs a lucrative trade in deadly, wood-alcohol tainted "Jamaica Ginger." When rivals try to move in on his operation, Torrez hires hit-men, but complications arise when one of the killers falls in love.
45	17	"Augie 'The Banker' Ciamino"	Stuart Rosenberg	Adrian Spies	February 9, 1961
Augie "The Banker" Ciamino is a bootlegger who seems to have developed an almost foolproof way of manufacturing his liquor. He has equipped over a hundred immigrant homes with small stills to actually make the stuff and a unique way of collecting the product. Not everyone in the immigrant community is participating in the illegal liquor-making operation and Eliot Ness visits a night class where adults learn English. His visit is followed by Ciamino's thugs who give the teacher a beating in front of his students. When shopkeeper Renzo Raineri intervenes, he learns that his son, a bookkeeper, is part of Ciamino's organization. Once Ness at his men learn how Ciamino collects the liquor, they try to catch him with goods but through intimidation and murder, the mobster proves to be elusive.
46	18	"The Underground Court"	Don Medford	Leonard Kantor	February 16, 1961
Mobster Valentine Ferrar thinks he has the perfect way to steal $500,000 of the syndicate's money. When a passenger liner returning from Cuba catches fire off the New Jersey coast, he fakes his death and sends his underling to the Underground Court, the mob's court of law, to tell them he drowned. They are soon on his trail however so when he meets up with a kooky widow, Hannah Wagnall, they set off on what she calls a second honeymoon. What he doesn't realize is that Wagnall has her own plans and that she's gone on these second honeymoons before. Ness and his men, with the help of State Police, track Valentine and Wagnall across several States as they too try to not only get the money but hopefully find out where the Underground Court meets.
47	19	"The Nick Moses Story"	Herman Hoffman	Story by : T.L.P. Swicegood; Teleplay by : Tim Darlo & John Mantley	February 23, 1961
When gangster Nick Moses and another Chicago mobster threaten to go to war after Moses poaches customers in the other's territory, Frank Nitti — now the top mobster in Chicago after the recent incarceration of Al Capone for tax evasion — tells them to settle things amicably, or else. Moses pretends to make amends but actually arranges a hit on his rival, one that also leads to a young newspaper boy being shot. When Nitti tells him he's a dead man, Moses tries to make one last deal -- in return for sparing his life, he will make sure Eliot Ness is killed. Nitti accepts the proposition and gives him six days to get the job done.
48	20	"The Antidote"	Walter Grauman	David Zelag Goodman	March 9, 1961
For years the Federal government has been trying to find a way to chemically de-nature industrial alcohol, but the mob has always found a way to re-nature the substance. In Chicago, the chief supplier of alcohol to the mob is Wally Baltzer (Telly Savalas) who employs a crew of chemists to ensure a smooth flow of the product. The latest government formula is proving hard to crack and one of Baltzer's chemists, the physically disabled Russell Shield, sees an opportunity to make a name and a small fortune for himself. When his colleague develops the right chemical formula, Shield decides to kill him and blackmail Baltzer and Frank Nitti.
49	21	"The Lily Dallas Story"	Don Medford	Story by : Harry Essex; Teleplay by : Leonard Kantor	March 16, 1961
Lily Dallas is a highly intelligent ex-con who has a history of committing bank robberies. This time she and her husband George 'Blackie' Dallas, who is known for his deft use of a Tommy gun, kidnap a well known and very rich businessman Thomas B. Randall and demand $300,000 ransom. Mrs. Randall follows their instructions and doesn't contact the police until after she has paid the ransom so Ness puts out a rumor that all of the bills have been marked. Blackie, however, is beginning to chafe under Lily's orders, all the more so as she is having an affair with a member of her crew, Marty Stoke. With the ransom money now unmovable, they go back to robbing banks.
50	22	"Murder Under Glass"	Walter Grauman	Harry Kronman	March 23, 1961
With the election of Franklin Roosevelt and the end in sight for prohibition, Frank Nitti and the Chicago mob have been shifting from alcohol to narcotics as their primary source of income. When their supply dries up, Nitti travels to New Orleans to meet with their supplier, Emile Bouchard, whose original shipment of drugs was hijacked but is expecting another any day. Nitti warns him that there better not be any foul-ups with this shipment but it soon becomes clear that Bouchard has plans of his own and is out to get a percentage of the mob's total income. Eliot Ness and his men are in New Orleans trying to break up the drug pipeline.
51	23	"Testimony of Evil"	Paul Wendkos	Joseph Petracca	March 30, 1961
Eliot Ness and the Untouchables are out to convict political boss Brian O'Malley and have two witnesses who will testify that he ordered a murder. O'Malley is an old-time politico who never seeks office himself but controls almost every party official that does. Ness' witnesses are living in a hotel under constant police protection but that doesn't stop O'Malley who manages to use a corrupt cop to kill one of them, George Davas. Ness' only remaining option is to find Davas' girlfriend, Julie Duvall, who he learns was also a witness to O'Malley orders. Time is of the essence for the Feds as mobsters for O'Malley are also on hot on her trail.
52	24	"Ring of Terror"	Walter Grauman	John Mantley	April 13, 1961
When boxer Joey McGrath dies in the ring, the medical examiner reports no special circumstances and the Press put it down to a tragic accident. A lab technician in the ME's office informs Eliot Ness that the medical report was fixed and McGrath had a high level of morphine in his blood, suggesting he had been drugged before the bout. McGrath's manager Barney Jarreau is a straight arrow who wasn't involved in the fix but with the McGrath incident about to be reviewed, numbers racketeer Rudy Krasna decides to force Jarreau's hand to fix an upcoming championship fight. Ness pressures Jarreau to help them out but he is reluctant to do so in order to protect his wife.
53	25	"Mr. Moon"	Paul Wendkos	Charles O'Neal & John Mantley	April 20, 1961
Melanthos Moon is a San Francisco art and antique dealer who manages to hijack a large supply of the special paper used to print U.S. Currency. He then arranges to spring from Leavenworth prison master counterfeiter Hans Dreiser to engrave the plates to produce the money. Eliot Ness and the Untouchables are soon on to him having followed Moon's henchman Benny Joplin back to his Oakland, California home. With the phony money available, Moon then approaches Chicago mobster Frank Nitti with an offer of $100 million split 50/50 with Nitti distributing the cash. Ness and his men are out to get one of the nearly perfect bills to get the serial number and stop the distribution of the cash before it starts.
54	26	"Death for Sale"	Stuart Rosenberg	David Zelag Goodman	April 27, 1961
Johnny Lubin has been on the make since he was a young kid. He quit school after grade 3 and by the age of 13 was paying off his truant officer $75 a week to leave him alone. Now 20, he owns a string of speakeasies on the waterfront, including opium dens. He soon hooks up with George Dodd a toy manufacturer whose real name is Phil Melnick and is a supposedly reformed mobster. He has $2 million worth of opium to distribute and Lubin thinks he has just the way to get it into the hands of distributors. Lubin's arrogance however pushes him into a deadly game of cat and mouse with Eliot Ness and his men.
55	27	"Stranglehold"	Paul Wendkos	Harry Kronman	May 4, 1961
Eliot Ness sets out to bring down Frank Makouris, who controls New York's Fulton Fish Market by intimidation and murder and who is responsible for the price of fish going up nearly 50%. Frank's boss, gangster Joe Kulak, tells Frank to lie low until Ness leaves, but Frank ramps up his terrorizing of the market, until Kulak is forced to throw a low-ranking hood to the feds as a sacrificial lamb in order to take the heat off himself. Unfortunately, it doesn't work out as planned.
56	28	"The Nero Rankin Story"	Stuart Rosenberg	Leonard Kantor	May 11, 1961
Although Eliot Ness and the Untouchables managed to destroy the Underground Court, they have yet to make a dent against the Syndicate, which has re-grouped and continues to operate. They elect Nero Rankin to chair the national board of the syndicate, but the choice wasn't unanimous. He's also in poor health and that leads Sylvia Orkins, who loves Rankin and is convinced he will die or be killed, to approach Eliot Ness to do something, anything, to get him out of his new job. Rankin knows he has only about a year to live and that he's an unpopular chairman so he offers Ness a deal: lay off the Syndicate for the year and when he's dead, he'll provide Ness with the Syndicate's books. When Ness turns him down, Rankin decides that there's only one option: fight back, which he does with vicious drive-by shooting attacks against the public by his gang.
57	29	"The Seventh Vote"	Stuart Rosenberg	Richard Collins	May 18, 1961
After Al Capone is imprisoned for tax evasion, he leaves his Chicago operation in the hands of a governing council. There are two factions however, one headed by Frank Nitti and the other by Jake "Greasy Thumb" Guzik, and they can't agree on anything. To resolve the deadlock, Capone asks his mentor, known only as Kafka, to return to the U.S.A. and take over the management of his organization. Kafka was deported 11 years previously and now lives in the Orient and Nitti and Guzik hire Alexander Stavro to ensure that Kafka entry is uneventful. Eliot Ness and the Untouchables work with the RCMP to ensure Kafka is prevented from crossing into the U.S.A.
58	30	"The King of Champagne"	Walter Grauman	David Zelag Goodman	May 25, 1961
After Federal Agents destroy a large shipment of champagne there a void in the market. Bottle manufacturer Edmund Wald decides that perhaps the time has come to start filling the bottles he sells. He teams with a bootleg liquor distributor, Michel Viton, who has the contacts to sell the stuff to. He also gets his cheapskate uncle Barney Loomis, a legitimate restaurant owner, involved by getting him to lend him the up-front money he needs to the illicit liquor operation underway. Wald is taking all the risk however with both Viton and Loomis making sure their own interests are protected. Wald has his own plans however.
59	31	"The Nick Acropolis Story"	Don Medford	Curtis Kenyon & John Mantley	June 1, 1961
Nick Acropolis has created a vast network of bookies and is the king of the numbers racket in the Chicago area. His problems start when he discovers that Louis Manzak, his wife's brother and the manager of one of his betting parlors, has skimmed $200,000 of the proceeds. Were it not for the family relationship, Nick would have had him killed but rather he gives Louis 48 hours to come with $50,000 as a down payment on what he owes. His sister lends him half of that amount but his attempt to borrow the rest from someone else leads to disaster. The dispute also brings Acropolis into a dispute with Frank Nitti while Nick's enforcer, Frankie Fershman, decides the time has come for him to move up in the organization.
60	32	"90-Proof Dame"	Walter Grauman	Harry Kronman	June 8, 1961
Nate Kester is a burlesque theatre operator who decides to branch out into the lucrative brandy business. He is producing his own brandy, of very poor quality, and using a fancy French label to try to pass it off as de Bouverais cognac. He realizes that if his scheme is to work, he will have to ensure that the real stuff is unavailable for comparison to the rot gut he will be marketing. He manages to destroy the principal supplier of the real stuff but Etienne de Bouverais himself comes to Chicago to put a new wholesaler in place. When he kills off de Bouverais he finds he has a formidable foe in the form of Madame de Bouverais, the former Marcie McKuen, at one time a dancer in his theatre. Eliot Ness tries to convince her to cooperate with the Feds to bring Kester down but she has her own plans to get even her former employer.

=== Season 3 (1961–62) ===
No. overall	No. in season	Title	Directed by	Written by	Original release date
61	1	"The Troubleshooter"	Stuart Rosenberg	Louis Pelletier	October 12, 1961
A new 5 and 10 cent game using punch boards has become very popular and lucrative for the syndicate that controls it. With Eliot Ness and the Untouchables targeting them, receipts are down so they decide to accept New York hood Nate Selko's plan to deal with Ness. Selko's offer of a bribe is rejected by Ness out of hand so he goes to plan B: set Ness up to shoot a man who is apparently unarmed. Ness knows he was fired at first but when no gun is found anywhere at the scene, it becomes front page news and he's forced to defend himself both publicly and to the DA.
62	2	"Power Play"	Paul Wendkos	Harry Kronman	October 19, 1961
With a public outcry over the level of gang violence in Chicago, the authorities appoint retired lawyer Willard Thornton to the new post of Crime Commissioner. What no one realizes is that he has formed a new syndicate bent on importing and distributing narcotics. When the new cartel's enforcer, Steve "Country Boy" Parrish, is arrested by Eliot Ness he is soon out on bail thanks to bail bondsman Barney Lubin, a Thornton associate. Parrish knows that Thornton's style is to eliminate any possible risk to his reputation so he is soon on the lam, living in the back room of a country garage run by Emmy Sarver. She has her own ideas, primarily focused on keeping Parrish around. As both Ness and Thornton close in, Country Boy Parrish must face the wrath of a woman scorned.
63	3	"Tunnel of Horrors"	Stuart Rosenberg	John Mantley	October 26, 1961
Acting on an anonymous tip, Eliot Ness and his men find themselves at a local carnival keeping an eye on an impending purchase of narcotics. The seller is Alexander Rader, a known drug dealer and the buyer is Arnold Justin on behalf of Frank Nitti. They are scheduled to meet in an electrical room accessible only through the tunnel of horrors tide. Justin is an ex-Chief of Detectives who was always honest when on the force but decided he was fed up putting his life on the line for minimal pay so he quit and now acts as a buyer for the mob. Unfortunately, he also realizes that the park is under police surveillance and refuses to go through with the buy. When the drugs disappear, Frank Nitti makes it quite clear that he expects Justin to deliver the goods, or else.
64	4	"The Genna Brothers"	Paul Wendkos	Harry Kronman	November 2, 1961
Within a few years of their arrival in the USA, the six Genna brothers have firmly establish themselves in Chicago's criminal community. Established in Chicago's Little Italy, they provide the Capone empire with illicit liquor that they have produced through a network of home distilleries that may only produce one gallon a day each. They also smuggle illegal aliens into the country and hold the threat of returning them to the old country if they don't do what they're told. Eliot Ness and his men have been trying to break up the Gennas network, but it has proved difficult to do as they can only find a few bottles at a time. With the help of a respected member of the local community, Carlo Giovanni, they try to get more information about the illegal operations. When the youngest Genna brother takes an interest in Giovanni's daughter, Ness moves in leading to a showdown with the family members.
65	5	"The Matt Bass Scheme"	Stuart Rosenberg	David Zelag Goodman	November 9, 1961
Matt Bass (Telly Savalas) is an ex-con and a former member of Al Capone's criminal empire. In prison, a fellow con, engineer Jason Fiddler develops what he thinks is the perfect way to deliver illicit liquor to central Chicago. Once out of jail, Bass approaches his old friend Frank Nitti to sell the idea. Nitti has been hit hard lately by Eliot Ness and the Untouchables who have pretty well shut down most of his distilleries and the speakeasies are starting to close their doors. Nitti tries to solve the delivery problem himself but in the end, agrees to Bass and Fiddler's scheme. Ness is soon on to them, however.
66	6	"Loophole"	Paul Wendkos	Harry Kronman	November 16, 1961
Morton Halas is an aggressive and very successful defense attorney who will stop at nothing to get his clients off. Having successfully defended Big Mike Probich he finds himself working for Larry Coombs, another small-time mobster who has ambition to rise to the top. Coombs and his top enforcer Whitey Metz decide to knock off Probich and take over his network. They succeed but things don't go as smoothly as planned and Eliot Ness soon has an eye witness who can identify both of them. Halas has a flair for the dramatic and just as the verdict in the case is about to be announced, he arranges for someone to stand up in open court and announce, with murder weapon in hand, that he is the killer. Ness and the District Attorney know that the fix is in and find they have to rely on their own trickery if Halas, Coombs and Metz are to face justice.
67	7	"Jigsaw"	Paul Wendkos	George Eckstein	November 23, 1961
Frank Nitti has a major problem: someone in his organization is leaking information to Eliot Ness and the Untouchables. They've closed down several of his distilleries and several members of the organization are starting to question Nitti's leadership. He decides to seek out someone who used to work for Al Capone, Walter Trager known as the Leaker, who has a knack for finding and closing down leaks in the organization. Trager narrows the possible list of leakers down to two people: Nitti driver Marty Wilger and his own brother-in-law Harry Mailer, a local politician on Nitti's payroll. Nitti orders them both killed but doesn't realize that Trager is out to take over the entire organization. Trager's sister, now a widow, has her own plans as well.
68	8	"Man Killer"	Stuart Rosenberg	Sy Salkowitz	December 7, 1961
Eliot Ness and his men are having success shutting down the narcotics trade in Chicago thanks to a series of anonymous telephone tips. Ness manages to trace the call to a phone booth and identify the caller as Nick Dulov, owner of the Windy City cab company. Dulov has stolen Nitti's 15 kilo shipment of heroin and then gives it back to him — with a proposition that they go into the narcotics distribution business together. Dulov's wife, Georgiana Drake, is fed up with their relationship however and having killed her husband tries to convince Nitti to do business with her. Her proposal is to use her fleet of taxis — and those in several other cities as well — as mobile narcotics stores and having the junkies come to them, rather than the other way around, and offer a free fix to anyone who brings in a new customer.
69	9	"City Without a Name"	Paul Wendkos	John Mantley	December 14, 1961
After a Federal Agent is gunned down, Eliot Ness and his Untouchables arrive in town to try to solve their colleague's murder. The perpetrator is believed to be Lou Mungo and his precipitate action is exactly the opening Frank Nitti was waiting for so he could move in himself. Nitti hires the smooth talking gambler Sebastian to convince Mungo to hand over his contacts at City Hall and he soon has the information he needs to blackmail Mungo. With Nitti putting pressure on Sebastian to get the deal done, Mungo decides to play hardball. Ness meanwhile is slowly building the case against Mungo for the murder.
70	10	"Hammerlock"	Stuart Rosenberg	Mel Goldberg	December 21, 1961
Always looking to expand their area of control, the mob is now out to get control of the bakery industry. Eliot Ness is in New York to testify at a trial and the local US Attorney asks him to stay on to help with the problem. Under the control of the Syndicate, Louis 'Lepke' Buchalter tasks Bryan "Bull" Hanlon to gain control of the industry by establishing a truckers association to get control of deliveries. Hanlon's inclination is to start with small bakers and slowly move up but under orders, he goes after the largest baker in the industry, Adam Stone. Highly respected in the industry, Stone is an old school businessman who isn't afraid to get his hands dirty or get down on his hands and knees to fix a piece of equipment. He wants nothing to do with the mob and isn't afraid to stand up to them. Until they threaten to harm his daughter Marcia, a dancer on Coney Island, who he has not seen for many years.
71	11	"The Canada Run"	Bernard McEveety	Harry Kronman & Barry Trivers	January 4, 1962
Father Francis Gregory thinks nothing short of a miracle has happened when Joe Palakopolous, known as Mr. Pal to his friends, walks into his church. Pal is very generous and provides several hundred dollars to start up and maintain a soup kitchen. He also buys the church a new organ and puts up a brightly lit cross atop the church steeple. What Father Gregory doesn't know is that Pal is a gangster who smuggles in whiskey from Canada and is using this small community as a base of operations. Ness and his men are soon onto Pal when a top brand of Canadian whiskey, Canada Gold, suddenly starts to appear on the market. They soon focus on Pal and realize that his generosity to the Church, especially the brightly lit cross, all have a specific purpose.
72	12	"Fall Guy"	Bernard L. Kowalski	David P. Harmon	January 11, 1962
After mob hit man Frankie Gruder kills a warehouseman — and is almost nabbed by Eliot Ness and his men in the process — he turns to his old friend Julius Vernon to get him out of it. Vernon conspires with Willie Willinsky, who knows practically every crook in town, to find someone to plead guilty to the murder. The fraud works so well that Vernon suggests the three of them form an employment agency of sorts. Anyone who wants a crime committed need only tell them what they want done. Vernon will devise the scheme, Willinsky will find the men to make it happen and Gruder will provide the muscle. They decide that they also need a figurehead to take the rap if they get caught so they focus on recruiting Big Joe Holvak who has just been released from prison after serving his 10 year sentence. Joe doesn't realize what he's gotten himself into nor that time has also passed him by.
73	13	"The Gang War"	Paul Wendkos	John Mantley	January 18, 1962
When gangsters invade and shoot up a speakeasy on the outskirts of Chicago, Ness thinks Frank Nitti may be trying to get rid of some of his competition. When one of Nitti's joints is bombed soon after, the authorities are worried that a massive gang war may erupt. The problem for Nitti is that the out-of-town clubs are getting quality booze smuggled in from Canada and its drawing away his well-heeled customers. He learns from one of the roadhouse managers that Parnise Surigao has been importing the liquor but he won't reveal where or how he's doing it. When Nitti takes one of the smugglers hostage and learns where Surigao is storing his liquor, he decides to get his hands on it.
74	14	"Silent Partner"	Abner Biberman	Harry Kronman	February 1, 1962
When Wallace Laughton is killed by Federal Agents, a mysterious man known only as The Partner orders that the agent responsible be eliminated. The Partner is a mysterious man whose identity is known to only a very few. He is reputedly the top man in organized crime. Lee Hobson is the agent responsible for shooting Laughton but when Eliot Ness gets wind of the contract, he claims responsibility and makes a point of telling the Press. Lee is taken aback with Eliot's moves and resents what he sees as his boss taking all the glory. When the contract killers kidnap Lee as bait to lure Ness into a trap, he learns exactly what his good friend is doing.
75	15	"The Whitey Steele Story"	Abner Biberman	George Eckstein	February 8, 1962
In New York on a case, Eliot Ness learns that mobster Joe Kulak is out to get control of the racing wire. The wire provides horse racing results from tracks across the country to betting parlors and bookies. The mob is out to get control of Michael Barrigan's wire service and they've killed Barrigan's two partners to put pressure on him. With information that Gregory Pindar will be running the mob's wire service, Ness travels to San Francisco undercover posing as hoodlum Whitey Steele to see if he can infiltrate the new operation. He gets a job with Pindar and learns that Pindar may also be importing heroin. Problems arise when a New York mobster, who knows Ness, shows up in town.
76	16	"The Death Tree"	Vincent McEveety	Harry Kronman	February 15, 1962
In the Gypsy quarter of Chicago, drunkenness is taking its toll in fights and killings. The local community elders, known as the Senate, want to bring it to an end but come into conflict with Janos Colescou, owner of much of the illicit liquor distribution in the area. He kills the head of the Senate, Victor Bartok and when the opposition continues, kills his brother Fedor. Throughout, Colescou has revived an old custom of posting his victims name on an old tree in the neighborhood. For Ness and his men, the goal is to try to bring Colescou out into the open and for that they get help from Victor Bartok's daughter Magda. She tells him that Colescou has personal reasons for wanting to get rid of the Bartoks.
77	17	"Takeover"	Bernard L. Kowalski	Theodore Apstein & Sy Salkowitz	March 1, 1962
The demand for real beer goes unabated and Charlie Zenko tries to consolidate his control of the North side of Chicago. He arranges for brew master Franz Koenig to get a visit from Eliot Ness. At his trial however, Koenig is saved when a stranger, Leo Mencken, provides him with the alibi he needs. Soon Koenig and Mencken are partners and are using Mencken's unique way of temporarily masking the re-alcoholization of the beer they produce. Charlie Zenko is none too pleased that his competition is back on the street but has the good sense to check with New York mobster Joe Kulak who confirms that Mencken is working for him. When they finally meet, Charlie Zenko is shocked to see just who Leo Mencken really is.
78	18	"The Stryker Brothers"	Stuart Rosenberg	Gilbert Ralston	March 8, 1962
Soon after the three Stryker brothers rob a train, killing someone in the process, Eliot Ness and his untouchables are on their trail. They get a warrant and seize the Strykers books and papers hoping to find something incriminating. The dim-witted Benny Striker has kept a piece of correspondence from the train robbery and his brothers decide they need to somehow get rid of that evidence. Benny approaches an old friend Mr. Jaeger, a retired arsonist, to set the Federal building's evidence room on fire and destroy the documents. He succeeds, but Ness uses basic psychology to ferret out Jaeger and the Stryker brothers.
79	19	"Element of Danger"	Bernard L. Kowalski	John Mantley	March 22, 1962
Victor Rait has developed a new method for converting opium to heroin and he and his partner Arnold Stegler hope to make a handsome profit. When Rait kills a Chicago policeman, who was actually on loan and working for Eliot Ness, he realizes that they have to clear out of their current location. Just as they are leaving Ness and his men arrives and Rait pretends to be an innocent bystander and witness to the shooting. When Stegler decides to eliminate Rait, Ness decides to use that to get Victor to cooperate.
80	20	"The Maggie Storm Story"	Stuart Rosenberg	George Eckstein	March 29, 1962
When junkie Benny Rivas is stopped by Eliot Ness and his men, he tells them in his dying breath that the source of his heroin is the 808 Club. Ness knows the club's hostess, Maggie Storm, quite well. She's married to the frequently absent owner and denies any knowledge of drugs being sold on the premises. In fact, she has set up a very clever trading floor where mobsters bid for anything from drugs to counterfeit money. She has a bigger problem however when Louis "Lepke" Buchalter decides he wants to take over the club and sends his murderous henchman Vince Shirer to eliminate anyone that might stand in his way. Ness decides to recruit a soon to be paroled mobster to infiltrate the organization.
81	21	"Man in the Middle"	Bernard L. Kowalski	Harry Kronman	April 5, 1962
Slot machines have become all the rage and William '"orker" Davis is making a fortune on all of those nickels and dimes. He soon comes under pressure from mobster Joe Bomer who's prepared to let him stay in business provided he gives the players a 70% return on their bets thereby making sure they will always come back. Davis agrees but when Bomer finds out the machines have been doctored to pay out less, Davis is soon on the run. Turns out it's Davis' friend and Bomer employee Benjy Liemer who has been fiddling with the machines and also providing Ness with anonymous tips.
82	22	"Downfall"	Stuart Rosenberg	Robert Libott	May 3, 1962
Joseph December is a legitimate businessman and the scion of a wealthy family who own the Great Lakes Pacific railroad which, by all accounts, is on its last legs. With Eliot Ness receiving hot tips and managing to intercept liquor being smuggled in from Canada, Al Capone enforcer Pete "The Persuader" Kalmiski and his underling Allan Sitkin approach December to make a deal. In return for letting them use his railway, December get to keep 20% of the proceeds. The death of a railway track worker however puts Ness and the Untouchables onto the scheme. When a side deal on shares with Sitkin goes bad and he commits suicide, December gets hold of information that he hopes he can use against Kalmiski. December's right hand man, Henry Grunther, is appalled at what is happening to the company and seeks Ness' assistance.
83	23	"The Case Against Eliot Ness"	Bernard L. Kowalski	George Eckstein	May 10, 1962
Mitchell Grandin is a prominent citizen of Chicago. As a former councilman and organizer of many charitable events, he has gained a reputation that he tries to put to good use. He's also trying to get the concessions for a major international fair and exposition celebrating Chicago's centenary and has hired a hit man to get rid of his competitors. When Eliot Ness tells the organizing committee that Grandin may be dirty, he finds himself being sued for slander to the tune of $500,000. His only possible defense is to prove that his suspicions are correct.
84	24	"The Ginnie Littlesmith Story"	Stuart Rosenberg	Leonard Kantor	May 17, 1962
A vice ring known as the Group has been hiding their speakeasies and brothels by using free soup kitchens as a front. When white slaver Chez Goshen dies his niece, Ginnie Littlesmith, decides to take possession of the Group's books. She had worked for her uncle and feels it is her inheritance. Enforcer Vic Cassandros tries to seduce the spinsterish Ginnie to get his hands on those books. Eliot Ness wants to get his hands on them as well knowing it would be the end of that racket.
85	25	"The Contract"	Bernard L. Kowalski	George Eckstein	May 31, 1962
When the attempted assassination of small-time hood Smiley Barris, New York mobster Joe Kulak hires cold-blooded assassin Ray Quist to kill him. Ness tries to get Barris to cooperate but he refuses. When a second attempt on Barris goes wrong, Barris calls his Johnny Templar to help him out. Templar runs a gambling boat that goes out to sea beyond the three mile limit and beyond the long arm of the law. Templar hides his friend Barris on board so Joe Kulak turns the tables on both of them. He cancels Quist's contract and gives it to Templar -- who knows that anyone who fails to deliver on a contract is executed. When Templar has second thoughts about killing his friend, he soon finds that Quist is after him.
86	26	"Pressure"	Vincent McEveety	Harry Kronman	June 14, 1962
With the end of Prohibition, gangsters have now focused on the drug trade. A New York-based syndicate known as the Big Six, long established in the illegal drug business, visit drug distributor Louis "The Bear" Madikoff in Chicago who has had his recent shipments to Lucky Luciano in New York picked off by Eliot Ness and his agents. Madikoff is convinced that fellow Chicago drug dealer Mike Pavanos is responsible for feeding Ness with information so he sets out to even the score. It turns out however that Madikoff's son Danny is dating Pavano's daughter Francie. Their fathers blind hatred of one another leads to tragedy.
87	27	"Arsenal"	Paul Wendkos	John Mantley	June 28, 1962
Frank Nitti and Bugs Moran are about to go to war, and to forestall that possibility, Eliot Ness and the Untouchables begin rounding up every machine gun owned by the gangsters' hitmen. To resupply himself, Nitti hires Polish gunsmith Jan Trobek to make a dozen Tommy guns. Unfortunately for Trobek and his wife, Nitti and Moran soon settle their differences, which means that the pair are now witnesses who could turn into liabilities for Nitti.
88	28	"The Monkey Wrench"	Bernard L. Kowalski	George Eckstein & Sy Salkowitz	July 5, 1962
The mobsters are fighting among themselves for greater control of the beer market and Frank Nitti thinks he has the perfect solution. He is smuggling German brew masters into the United States and as a result, is making a far superior product than his competitors. This doesn't sit well with the New York mob, particularly Joe Kulak who decides to do something about it. He hires enforcer Karl Hansa, a bit of a madman, to infiltrate Nitti's operation and shut it down. Eliot Ness and the Untouchables are soon on to the whole scheme thanks to information from an attractive woman, Mady Collins, who seems to have taken a liking to Ness.

=== Season 4 (1962–63) ===
No. overall	No. in season	Title	Directed by	Written by	Original release date
89	1	"The Night They Shot Santa Claus"	Alex March	Mort Thaw	September 25, 1962
It's Christmas Eve 1930 and Eliot Ness and his men are investigating the murder of a close friend of his, Hap Levinson. The man had been playing Santa Claus at a children's orphanage and had just left when he was gunned down by a passing car. Levinson was the front man in a nightclub-speakeasy and he and Ness had spent many hours together laughing and passing the time of day. As Ness looks into his old friend's background, he learns that he may have had a girlfriend named Renée that he kept in a downtown apartment. It's readily apparent that she's a junkie and what he learns about his friend isn't pretty. Soon, mobsters are being knocked off and it seems someone is getting rid of witnesses to a crime.
90	2	"The Cooker in the Sky"	Robert Butler	John D.F. Black	October 2, 1962
With their breweries being knocked off by the Feds, local mobsters bring in an outsider from New York, Joey Lassiter. Known as the best inside man in the business, he promises them a Ness-proof operation. Caught in the middle is Harry Gordon, the current inside man who now finds himself nothing more than an errand boy. Harry's wife Edna isn't too pleased and starts feeding information to Ness. She eventually convinces Harry to do the same and were it not for their tips, Ness would be completely in the dark. Soon, however, Ness and his men find the location of Lassiter's planned brewery on the 6th floor of an industrial building. Ness' plan is to let Lassiter finish the brewery before shutting it down but Agent Lee Hobson is concerned it will look like they're on the take if they don't close it down immediately.
91	3	"The Chess Game"	Stuart Rosenberg	David Zelag Goodman	October 9, 1962
Having had major successes in eliminating the illegal trade in champagne, Eliot Ness and the Untouchables suddenly find that the expensive wine is finding its way onto the market again. During one raid, they find that a couple of the bottles are frozen solid and Ness speculates that they may have been shipped in a refrigerated car. They trace the illegal shipment to Ira Bauer, a blind fish and seafood wholesaler. For Bauer, his lack sight is anything but an impediment. He particularly likes to play chess as a way of keeping his mind sharp. He and Ness are soon involved in their own game as the Treasury officer tries to get the evidence he needs to shut down Bauer's operation.
92	4	"The Economist"	Paul Stanley	Harold Gast	October 16, 1962
With the price of illicit liquor bottoming out, Vincent Tunis suggests to his fellow syndicate members that they store their liquor rather than sell it, thereby creating an artificial shortage and pushing up the price. Eliot Ness and his men become aware of what's going on when the syndicate also starts to put small moonshiners out of business. When the only mobster who knows the location of the liquor is killed, Ness and his men try to find the only remaining truck driver from the job before the syndicate does.
93	5	"The Pea"	Paul Stanley	Harry Kronman	October 23, 1962
Herbie Catcher is a small-time nobody who really wants to improve his status in life. He tries to impress those around him, but without success. He's even tried to feed information to Eliot Ness hoping for praise, but he really has nothing to offer. He's a busboy at a posh restaurant run by Max Zenner and he's not very good at it. On the verge of being fired, he claims to have a recently killed employee's book naming names and other activities that have gone on at the restaurant., especially having to do with mobster Martin Rawlings. His demands aren't that great: he wants to be named the Captain of the waiters but eventually greed takes hold and he forces Rawlings to make him a partner. Throughout, Eliot Ness warns Catcher that he's playing a dangerous game and getting involved with hoods can only lead to jail or death.
94	6	"Bird in the Hand"	Walter Grauman	Harry Kronman	October 30, 1962
Gangster Arnie Kurtz is moving into Chicago's South Side and Eliot Ness very much wants to nab him, putting a 24-hour watch and tapping his phones. The operation is put in danger however when Kurtz inadvertently becomes part of a public health emergency. Against his better judgment -but at his wife's insistence -- he agrees to let her brother Benno Fisk deliver $100,000 to a New York mobster. Unknown to anyone, Benno has contracted Parrot Fever from a recently acquired pet and collapses soon after his arrival. Federal health official frantically try to trace the source of the infectious disease. For Arnie Kurtz it may mean trouble as he and his wife have been caring for Benno's pets while he is away.
95	7	"The Eddie O'Gara Story"	Robert Butler	Carey Wilber	November 13, 1962
Bugs Moran, hiding out since Al Capone eliminated his gang in the St. Valentine's Day Massacre, is visited by Eddie O'Gara, a man he thought had been killed by rival gangsters several years previously. Although he never cared for O'Gara in the first place, Moran is intrigued when Eddie lays out a plan to put Moran back in charge of the rackets again. Meanwhile, Eliot Ness is looking for Moran and O'Gara, figuring that both will want revenge on the gangsters who are responsible for their plight and that he can use that to destroy the Chicago syndicates permanently.
96	8	"Elegy"	Robert Butler	Herman Groves	November 20, 1962
When mobster Charley Radick learns that he has leukemia and only a short time to live, he decides the time has come to visit his daughter, Margaret, now a young woman. When Charley had gone to prison for a 10-year stretch, he had left her with the Wilsons but when he got out, he decided to concentrate on moving up in the rackets and left the girl with them. When he visits the Wilsons, however, he's told that Margaret left some three years before. When Eliot Ness learns that Radick is dying, he asks him to come clean and give him the organization's books. Radick makes a deal: if Ness can locate his daughter, he will give him the information he wants. Ness then turns to Lt. Agatha Stewart of the Missing Persons Bureau for help.
97	9	"Come and Kill Me"	Robert Gist	Kitty Buhler	November 27, 1962
After a mobster with valuable information is killed in broad daylight at the racetrack, Eliot Ness and his men try to identify the killer. No one will admit knowing him but by tracing his movements, they find he was a regular visitor to the home of Dexter Lloyd Bayless who lives in a well-to-do suburb of Chicago. Through surveillance, they note that he has regular visitors in the afternoon and Ness decides to break into the house to plant a listening device. Through that, they learn that Bayless is running a very special school out of his home: a school for assassins.
98	10	"A Fist of Five"	Ida Lupino	Herman Groves	December 4, 1962
Mike Brannon is a tough cop but his two blocks of Chicago are among the safest there are. He has a tendency to be rough with hoodlums and when he beats up one of Tony Lamberto's boys he finds himself on indefinite suspension. Fed up with his corrupt superiors, he decides the time has come for him to make some money so he enlists his four brothers in a plot to kidnap Lamberto and hold him for $150,000 ransom. Unbeknown to anyone, Lamberto had recently approached Eliot Ness with a proposition: he would be prepared to roll up his entire operation and retire if the District Attorney would ensure no jail time from his upcoming trial on tax evasion. Soon, both Lamberto's associates and Ness are looking for him with the Brannon brothers in the middle.
99	11	"The Floyd Gibbons Story"	Robert Butler	George Eckstein & Mort R. Lewis	December 11, 1962
When newspaper man Carlton Edwards is gunned down on the street, the police and his friends initially think it's a case of being in the wrong place at the wrong time. Eliot Ness and his men soon determine that Edwards was the target of a mob hit. His old friend, Floyd Gibbons, now a globe-trotting reporter, happens to be passing through Chicago and decides he's going to find the culprit. Working with Ness, they soon uncover that the hit was related to a series of articles Edwards was planning on the takeover of the scrap metal business by the mob.
100	12	"Doublecross"	Paul Wendkos	John Mantley	December 18, 1962
Mobster Jake Kuzik is a major liquor supplier in Chicago and he doesn't hesitate to use strong arm tactics to keep his network of distributors and retailers in check. He's been having trouble getting supply lately and he comes under pressure — helped along by Eliot Ness and his men — to find liquor for sale or else. He forms an alliance with an arch-rival, Bugs Moran, to import half a million gallons of whiskey by train and they set up a clever deception to keep Federal agents off the scent.
101	13	"Search for a Dead Man"	Robert Butler	Harold Gast & Herman Groves	January 1, 1963
When a body is fished out of the river, Lt. Aggie Stewart of the Bureau of Missing Persons is put in charge of the case. After 10 days and having made little headway, the body is buried in a pauper's grave. As is her custom, she attends the funeral to see if anyone shows up. In this case, flowers are sent from a well-known mob-owned business. She manages to trace the woman who sent the flowers. Eliot Ness meanwhile is looking to stop the biggest shipment ever of illegal liquor worth well over $1 million. What they all soon realize is that the two cases are connected.
102	14	"The Speculator"	Allen Reisner	Max Ehrlich	January 8, 1963
Leo Stazak is a small-time con artist on the periphery of the mob and he decides to con Frank Nitti in a stock scam. Stazak is a fast talker and an expert liar who quickly gains Nitti's confidence. Soon, the big man has entrusted half a million dollars to Stazak who has been printing fake stock certificates. Ness is also on to Stazak's printer and it doesn't take long for Nitti to realize what is going on.
103	15	"The Snowball"	Alex March	George Eckstein & Norman Katkov	January 15, 1963
Jack Parker (Robert Redford) is an up-and-coming young hustler who wants to become part of Frank Nitti's (Bruce Gordon) organization. He thinks there's an untapped market on university and college campuses but Nitti thinks he's just a nickel and dimer and isn't interested. Parker has been making his own booze and selling it through Benny Angel (Gerald Hiken), who hangs around the University of Chicago campus actually selling the stuff to the kids. Parker decides to get Nitti's interest by secretly arranging to sell wood alcohol to students and then convincing Nitti that he can make sure the stuff sold to students is clean. When Benny Angel is found dead, Ness has another reason to find the man behind the scheme.
104	16	"Jake Dance"	Robert Butler	Gilbert Ralston	January 22, 1963
When a large supply of hair tonic is stolen, Ness and the Untouchables are concerned that it may be used as a base for illegal — and deadly — liquor. Soon after, the stuff starts to appear flavored with ginger jake, a popular patent medicine. The result is a permanent neurological disorder that was first seen in a major outbreak in Kansas City. The first victim in Chicago is Mary Kay Spencer, a 17-year-old who drank the stuff while out on a date with her boyfriend. Working with public health officials, Ness tries to track down the source of the deadly hooch.
105	17	"Blues for a Gone Goose"	Sherman Marks	Don Brinkley	January 29, 1963
Ray "Goose" Gander runs a jazz club in Chicago and he's coming under pressure from mobster Lou Cagan to sell booze at the club. Gander is a former musician who is in the business for the love of the music and wants nothing to do with selling the mob's liquor, but he's being backed into a corner. His protégé, trumpeter Eddie Moon, urges him to pack it in and go on the road but when Gander refuses, Eddie also talks him out of signing up with Cagan. When Gander is shot, Eddie blames himself for the death of his friend and mentor and he works with Eliot Ness and the Untouchables to bring Cagan down. He forms a partnership with Cagan to re-open Gander's club and he also starts an affair with Cagan's wife but he soon falls under suspicion.
106	18	"Globe of Death"	Walter Grauman	John Mantley	February 5, 1963
Frank Nitti decides to import a large amount of heroin -- $2 million worth. Eliot Ness is soon onto him and arrests the delivery man, Mr. Yang from Shanghai, but he no longer has the goods and they have no reason to detain him. Ness and one of his men travel to San Francisco to see if they can determine how the goods were smuggled into the country and determine that it entered on a passenger cruiser and was then shipped by air to Chicago enclosed in a large globe. Meanwhile, one of Nitti's fellow gangsters, Larry Bass, has his own plans for the drugs and assembles his own team to break into the bank vault where Nitti is temporarily storing the globe.
107	19	"An Eye for an Eye"	Robert Gist	John D.F. Black	February 19, 1963
A father's heartbreak at his son's death leads him to partner with Eliot Ness to bring in a major liquor distributor. Charles Tarasovich knows his son delivered liquor for Sol Girsch and Ness knows it as well, but without a witness who's actually done business with Girsch, there's no chance of getting a conviction. Charles offers to set a trap for Girsch and Ness agrees. Girsch meanwhile has seen his business grow to over 500 distributors and now wants a better deal from those who manufacture the illicit liquor. He also brings in some mobsters from Detroit to make sure he gets it.
108	20	"Junk Man"	Paul Wendkos	Herman Groves	February 26, 1963
Mobster Victor Salazar is out to steal a commercial shipment of morphine destined to a Chicago medical facility. Before he can do so however, it's snatched out from under him by one of his henchman, Steve Ballard. With Eliot Ness and his men have been keeping a close eye on Salazar, the drug kingpin desperately tries to find the junk. What he doesn't know is that another of his underlings, Barney Howe is actually Barney Retsick, a Federal narcotics Agent. Retsick and Ness work together to arrest all of the criminals before the narcotics, disguised as children's candy, hits the streets.
109	21	"The Man in the Cooler"	Ida Lupino	John D.F. Black	March 5, 1963
"Fat" Augie Strom is Eliot Ness's target at the moment. His meat packing plant is not only a front for his illegal booze business, but in those pre-airconditioned days, its cooler is the only place a person his size can find a comfortable temperature. Eliot Ness has made contact with Al Remp in prison and arranged for him to rejoin Augie's organization upon release and communicate with the Untouchables. His wife Marcie is ignorant of his purposes and opposes his "gang" activities, even asking Ness to return him to prison for his safety. When the money gets good, Al decides to throw in with the mob for real. Who will win out? A greedy gangster or a loving wife?
110	22	"The Butcher's Boy"	Allen Reisner	Harry Kronman	March 12, 1963
Phil Hedden operates a vicious extortion racket; as president of the Alliance of Master Butchers, he promises "protection" to the meat marketers of Chicago. His second in command is Davey McCain, a war buddy, who works with a rival, Gus Ducek, trying to muscle in on the operation. Ducek is given almost a third, but McCain is cut out. What can he do except have Ducek killed? The plot thickens when McCain and Hedden try to kill each other; Hedden winds up hanged on a meat hook; Mc Cain takes over. Eliot Ness sets out to thwart McCain's every move to possess Hedden's girl, his special table at Pierre's, his apartment... hoping to provoke him into an explosion which will result in his downfall. It does — literally.
111	23	"The Spoiler"	Laslo Benedek	Tony Barrett	March 26, 1963
Johnny Mizo has been on the lam for several years working as a seaman on cargo ships. He left the country after stealing $200,000 from mobster Vince Majesky who has been waiting patiently for his return. On Mizo's arrival in the U.S., Majesky has his hoods waiting for him but they kill the wrong man so both Majesky and Eliot Ness are now on the lookout for him in Chicago. When he committed the original robbery, Mizo's brother was killed but that doesn't stop him from seeking his sister-in-law's help and recruiting his nephew Arnie as he attempts to recover the hidden loot.
112	24	"One Last Killing"	Allen Reisner	Harold Gast	April 2, 1963
Eliot Ness knows that John "The Cropper" Cropsie killed Belle Alpine's husband and that she witnessed it but, for reasons of her own, she won't identify him. Cropsie is a small-time hood who wants to get into the big-time and gets a job loan-sharking for Julie Flack. One of his marks tells him that a local company has manufactured 50,000 gallons of industrial alcohol. He manages to steal the precious liquid and tries to sell it to Flack. Ness is onto him quickly and Cropsie has made a serious error in including Belle Alpine's brother-in-law Murray in his plans.
113	25	"The Giant Killer"	Leonard Horn	George Eckstein	April 9, 1963
Ed "The Duke" Monte is sent to prison, and the reported informer is murdered on the orders of his son-in-law, Lou Sultan. Monte escapes from custody with the help of his bodyguard, Yanos Dalker, and vows to kill the real snitch. He does not allow Sultan or his daughter Barbara to know his whereabouts, suspecting they may be responsible. The old man was shot in the escape, so it becomes a race against time — who will win the ensuing gang war? Meanwhile Ness is not only trying to recapture Monte, but also identify the informer who gave info by Western Union; he discovers it was a woman. Could it be Monte's daughter?
114	26	"The Charlie Argos Story"	Leonard Horn	Harry Kronman & Robert Libott	April 16, 1963
Prohibition has come to an end, and bootlegger Frank "The King" Argos has also come to the end of his life. Eliot Ness declines his request to become the executor of his estate, for obvious reasons. When he dies, his minions are appalled to learn about the provisions of The King's legacy. He's left his illegal empire (including $5 million in bonds) to his son Charlie, who was declared MIA at the very end of World War I. Charlie's bodyguard as a child and Argos' girlfriend recruit and train someone to pose as the long-lost son, but they find that he seems to know more about Charlie's childhood than they do.
115	27	"The Jazz Man"	Vincent McEveety	David Zelag Goodman	April 30, 1963
When a police captain's son is arrested in a drug sweep, Eliot Ness decides to try to locate the source of the drugs. The pusher was someone known as Peepers but he dies before they can get much information from him. They do manage to trace him to Chicago nightclub owner Sal Rudin and believe the heroin originated in New Orleans. Ness travels to the Big Easy posing as a bass player and meets booking agent Russ Bogan, who is part of the distribution network. He also learns of their unique system of delivering the goods across the country.
116	28	"The Torpedo"	Ida Lupino	Ed Adamson & Carey Wilber	May 7, 1963
Mobster Victor Kurtz makes peace with his main rival for illegal liquor distribution in Chicago's South Side, Monk Lyselle. All goes well for several months until Eliot Ness and his men begin to intervene. They begin to hijack Kurtz' trucks and he automatically assumes that Lyselle has broken their agreement. Over the several months there was peace, Kurtz' main gunman, Holly Kester, has lost his nerve and Ness focuses on him as a possible way to put both Kurtz and Lyselle out of business.
117	29	"Line of Fire"	Robert Butler	Tony Barrett & Irving J. McCarthy	May 14, 1963
When one of Marty Pulaski's dance hall girls is shot by a sniper just outside his nightclub, he automatically assumes that his main rival, Vince Bogan, is responsible. Bogan controls most of the 10 cent dance halls in Chicago, but there has been peace between the two, mostly because of mobster Janos "Jake" Szabo. Marty loses his temper and kills Bogan which Szabo is willing to forgive, if Bogan really ordered the killing. When a second girl is killed, it becomes obvious that someone else is behind the killing and Marty tries to protect himself and his brother Herbie.
118	30	"A Taste for Pineapple"	Alex March	Will Lorin	May 21, 1963
When racketeer Danny Mundt decides the time has come to get rid of Eliot Ness, he hires hit man Elroy Daldran. During World War I, Elroy had developed a taste for killing and he sees no reason to stop doing what he liked just because the war was over. His first attempt to get Ness — he tosses a grenade into his passing car — is foolishly executed and unsuccessful. Ness manages to jump out of the car before the grenade explodes but when he regains consciousness, he finds that he is blind. Ness' doctor is at a loss to find the cause of the blindness nor can he determine if it is temporary or permanent. While Mundt is satisfied with the result of the attempted killing, Elroy won't be satisfied until the job is completely done. Ness goes into hiding and when Elroy finds him, Elroy kills one of Ness' bodyguards while the other two bodyguards unexplainably abandon Ness to his fate. This was the final episode of the series.

== Home releases ==
The following DVD sets have been released by Paramount Home Video.

DVD set	Episodes	Release date
The Untouchables: Season 1, Volume 1	14	April 10, 2007
The Untouchables: Season 1, Volume 2	14	September 25, 2007
The Untouchables: Season 2, Volume 1	16	March 18, 2008
The Untouchables: Season 2, Volume 2	16	August 26, 2008
The Untouchables: Season 3, Volume 1	16	August 25, 2009
The Untouchables: Season 3, Volume 2	12	November 10, 2009
The Untouchables: The 4th Season, Volume 1	14	July 24, 2012
The Untouchables: The 4th Season, Volume 2	16	July 24, 2012
