= The Untouchables (1959 TV series) =

American crime drama television series (1959–1963)

- Genre: Crime drama
- Starring: Robert Stack; Abel Fernandez; Nicholas Georgiade; Paul Picerni; Steve London; Bruce Gordon; Neville Brand
- Narrated by: Walter Winchell
- Theme music composer: Nelson Riddle
- Composers: Bill Loose; Jack Cookerly; Nelson Riddle
- Country of origin: United States
- Original language: English
- No. of seasons: 4
- No. of episodes: 118 and two-part pilot (list of episodes)

Production
- Executive producers: Alan A. Armer; Desi Arnaz; Leonard Freeman; Quinn Martin; Jerry Thorpe
- Producers: Alan A. Armer; Alvin Cooperman; Walter Grauman; Bert Granet; Paul Harrison; Herman Hoffman; Sidney Marshall; Vincent McEveety; Del Reisman; Norman Retchin; Lloyd Richards; Stuart Rosenberg; Charles Russell; Josef Shaftel
- Cinematography: Robert B. Hauser; Glen MacWilliams; Charles Straumer
- Camera setup: Single-camera
- Running time: 50 minutes
- Production companies: Desilu Productions; Langford Productions (1962–1963) (season 4); ABC Productions; CBS Productions

Original release
- Network: ABC
- Release: October 15, 1959 – May 21, 1963

The Untouchables is an American crime drama television series produced by Desilu Productions that ran from 1959 to 1963 on the ABC television network. Based on the memoir of the same name by Eliot Ness and Oscar Fraley, it fictionalizes the experiences of Ness as a Prohibition agent fighting crime in Chicago in the 1930s with the help of a special team of agents handpicked for their courage, moral character and incorruptibility, nicknamed the Untouchables. The book was later made into a celebrated film in 1987 and a second, less-successful TV series in 1993.

A hard-hitting action drama and a landmark television crime series, The Untouchables won series star Robert Stack the Emmy Award for Best Actor in a Dramatic Series in 1960.

== Series overview ==
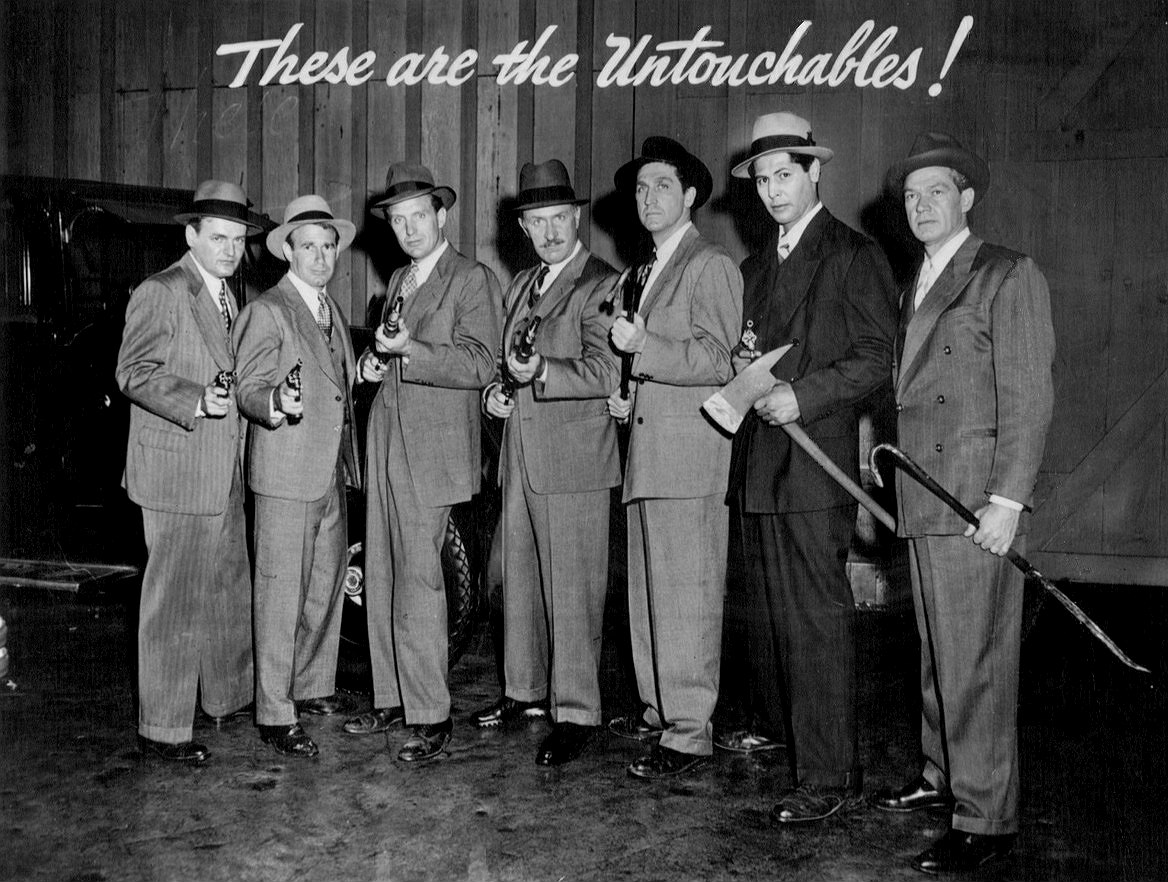
Photo of the cast for The Untouchables as seen on Desilu Playhouse: Only Robert Stack (third from left) and Abel Fernandez (second from right) were used in the actual television series. Keenan Wynn is seen here at the right of Robert Stack, Peter Leeds (who played LaMarr Kane, replaced in the series by Chuck Hicks) is to the right of Wynn, and TV's Kit Carson, Bill Williams as Marty Flaherty (replaced by Jerry Paris in the series), is on the far right. Actor Paul Dubov, who played Jack Rossman (replaced in the series by Steve London), is missing from this photo.

The series originally focused on the efforts of a real-life squad of Prohibition agents employed by the United States Department of Justice and led by Eliot Ness (Stack) who helped bring down the bootleg empire of "Scarface" Al Capone, as described in Ness's bestselling 1957 memoir. This squad was nicknamed "The Untouchables" because of its courage and honesty; squad members could not be bribed or intimidated by the mob. Eliot Ness, though, died suddenly in May 1957, shortly before his memoir and the subsequent TV adaptation were to bring him fame beyond any he experienced in his lifetime.

The pilot for the series, a two-part episode entitled "The Untouchables", originally aired on CBS's Westinghouse Desilu Playhouse on April 20 and 27, 1959. Later retitled "The Scarface Mob", these episodes, which featured Neville Brand as Al Capone, were the only episodes in the series to be more-or-less directly based on Ness's memoir, and ended with the conviction and imprisonment of Capone. CBS, which had broadcast most of Desilu's television output since 1951 beginning with I Love Lucy, was offered the new series following the success of the pilot film. Chairman William S. Paley rejected it on the advice of network vice president Hubbell Robinson. ABC, however, agreed to air the series, and The Untouchables premiered on October 15, 1959. In the pilot movie, the mobsters generally spoke with unrealistic pseudo-Italian accents, but this idiosyncratic pronunciation was dropped when the series debuted.

The weekly series first dramatized a power struggle to establish a new boss in the absence of Capone himself (for the purpose of the TV series, the new mob boss was Frank Nitti, although this was, as usual for the series, contrary to fact). As the series continued, a highly fictionalized portrayal of Ness and his crew developed as all-purpose, multiagency crime fighters who went up against an array of 1930s-era gangsters and villains, including Ma Barker, Dutch Schultz, Bugs Moran, Vincent "Mad Dog" Coll, Legs Diamond, Lucky Luciano, and in one episode, Nazi agents. On many occasions during the series' run, Ness would blatantly violate suspects' Fourth Amendment rights with no legal ramifications or consequences.

The terse narration by gossip columnist Walter Winchell, in his distinctive New York accent, was a stylistic hallmark of the series, along with its ominous theme music by Nelson Riddle and its shadowy black-and-white photography, which was influenced by film noir.

=== Controversy ===
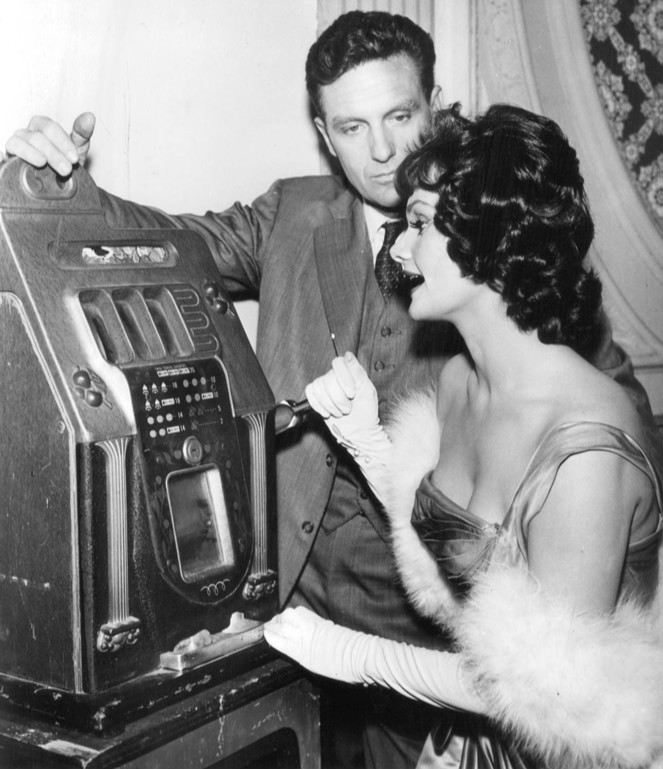
Stack as Eliot Ness with Gloria Talbott, 1962

The show drew harsh criticism from some Italian Americans, including Frank Sinatra, who felt it promoted negative stereotypes of them as mobsters and gangsters. The Capone family unsuccessfully sued CBS, Desilu Productions, and Westinghouse Electric Corporation for their depiction of the Capone family. In the first episode of the first season, the character of "Agent (Rico) Rossi", a person of Italian extraction who had witnessed a gangland murder, was added to Ness's team.

On March 9, 1961, Anthony Anastasio, chief of the Brooklyn waterfront and its International Longshoremen's Association, marched in line with a picket group who identified themselves as "The Federation of Italian-American Democratic Organizations". In protest formation outside the ABC New York headquarters, they had come together to urge the public boycott of Liggett & Myers Tobacco Company (L&M) products, including Chesterfield cigarettes, the lead sponsor of The Untouchables. They expressed displeasure with the program, which to them vilified Italian Americans, stereotyping them as the singular criminal element. The boycott and the attendant firestorm of publicity had the effect Anastasio and his confederates wanted. Four days after the picket of ABC, L&M, denying it had bowed to intimidation, announced it would drop its sponsorship of The Untouchables, maintaining the decision was based on network scheduling conflicts. The following week, the head of Desilu, Desi Arnaz (who had attended high school with Capone's son Albert), in concert with ABC and the "Italian-American League to Combat Defamation", issued a formal three-point manifesto:

- No more fictional hoodlums with Italian names will be in future productions.
- More stress will be given to the law-enforcement role of "Rico Rossi", Ness's right-hand man on the show.
- An emphasis will be given to the "formidable influence" of Italian-American officials in reducing crime with an emphasis on the "great contributions" made to American culture by Americans of Italian descent.

The series also incurred the displeasure of the powerful director of the Federal Bureau of Investigation, J. Edgar Hoover, when the fictionalized scripts depicted Ness and his Treasury agents involved in operations that were actually the province of the FBI. (The Untouchables belonged to the Federal Agency that later became known as the ATF). The second episode of the series, for example, depicted Ness and his crew involved in the capture of the Ma Barker gang, an incident in which the real-life Ness played no part. The producers agreed to insert a spoken disclaimer on future broadcasts of the episode stating that the FBI had primary responsibility for the Barker case.

The Untouchables was an unusually violent TV program for the era and its frequent and surprisingly explicit depictions of drug abuse and prostitution were described by the National Association for Better Radio and Television as "not fit for the television screen". Several episodes included depictions of violence toward children.

In an article titled "The New Enemies of The Untouchables" Ayn Rand argued that the persistent, superficial attacks received by The Untouchables were due to its appeal and its virtues: Its moral conflict and moral purpose.

== Cast ==
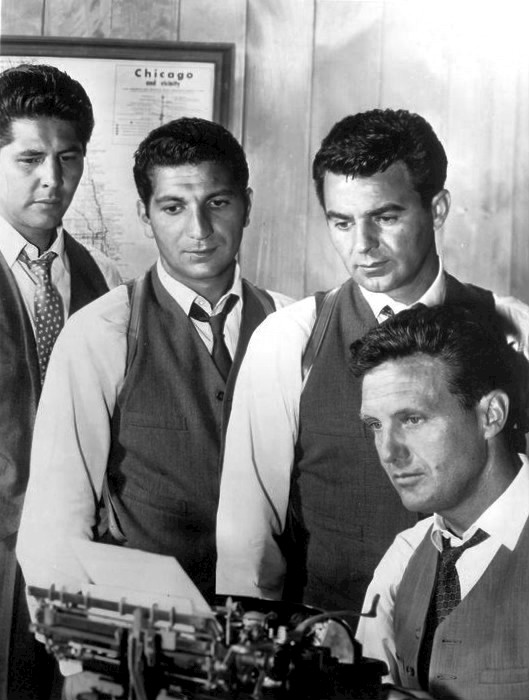
The cast from left: Abel Fernandez, Nicholas Georgiade, Paul Picerni, (seated) Robert Stack (not shown: Steve London)

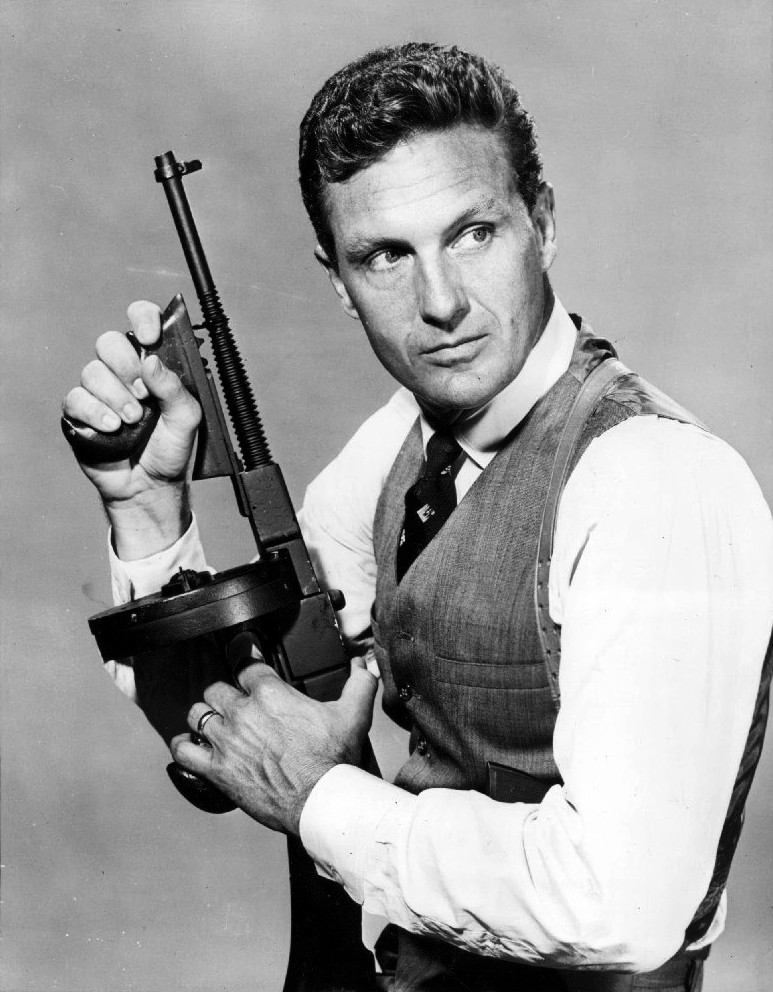
Robert Stack as Eliot Ness

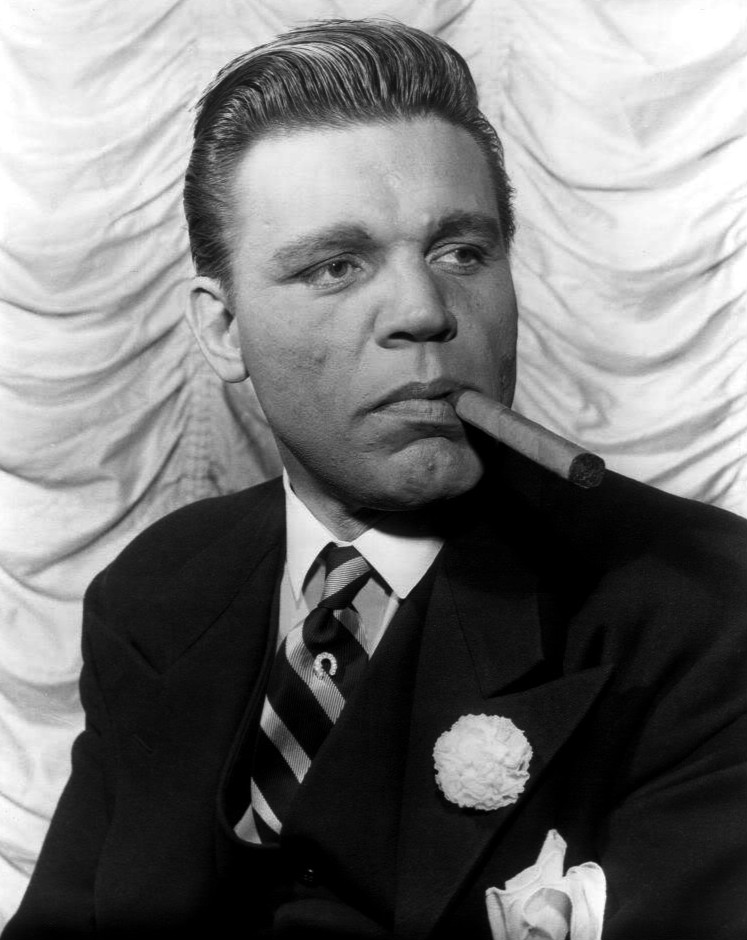
Neville Brand as Al Capone

The series had 118 episodes which ran 50 minutes each. Though the book chronicled the experiences of Ness and his cohorts against Capone, and in reality the Untouchables disbanded soon after Capone's conviction, the series continued after the pilot and book ended, depicting the fictitious further exploits of the Untouchables against many, often real-life, criminals over a span from 1929 to 1935. The television episodes were broadcast in no chronological timeline, but were set mostly in the early 1930s (for example, one episode, "You Can't Pick the Number", begins with Winchell's words, "October 1932: the depth of the Depression"), and another episode "Canada Run" begins at Chicago Stadium at the NFL Playoff Game on December 18, 1932. A few episodes were set primarily in a locale other than Chicago (such as the one dealing with the shootout involving Ma Barker and her gang.) Characters and "facts" in the majority of the episodes were more often than not entirely fictitious or loosely based composites of true-life criminals of that era. The gripping theme music was by Nelson Riddle.

Quinn Martin produced the show's first season, which contained elements that could be found in future TV series produced by Martin.

The most prominent Untouchables were portrayed by:

- Robert Stack as Agent Eliot Ness
- Nicholas Georgiade as Agent Enrico "Rico" Rossi
- Paul Picerni as Agent Lee Hobson, (second season on)
- Abel Fernandez as Agent William Youngfellow
- Steve London as Agent Jack Rossman (portrayed in the pilot by Paul Dubov)*

Other Untouchables members who were prominent at first, but did not last past the pilot or the first season, were portrayed by:

- Jerry Paris as Agent Martin Flaherty, (first season only-portrayed in the pilot by Bill Williams)
- Chuck Hicks as Agent LaMarr Kane (first season only-portrayed in the pilot by Peter Leeds) killed off in the first season episode, "The Tri-State Gang."
- Anthony George as Agent Cam Allison, (first season only) killed off in the season-one finale, "The Frank Nitti Story"
- Keenan Wynn as Agent Joe Fuselli (pilot episode only)
- Eddie Firestone as Agent Eric Hansen (pilot episode only)
- Robert Osterloh as Agent Tom Kopka (pilot episode only)

In addition to the Untouchables themselves, several allies were in more than one episode:

- Frank Wilcox as Federal District Attorney Beecher Asbury
- Robert Bice as Police Capt. Johnson
- Jason Wingreen as Police Capt. Dorset
- Raymond Bailey as US Attorney for New York John Carvell
- Barbara Nichols as Brandy La France, showgirl and wife/widow of an informant, appearing in both the pilot and premiere
- Dane Clark as Dr. Victor Garr
- John Gabriel as Dr. Daniel Gilford
- Barbara Stanwyck as Lt. Agatha Stewart, head of the Missing Persons Bureau
- Ed Asner as Frank, one of Agatha Stewart's assistants
- Virginia Capers as June, one of Agatha Stewart's assistants

The show also had several recurrent gangsters, many of them loosely based on real-life gangsters of the time:

- Frank Nitti, Capone's enforcer who takes over the Chicago mob after Capone is imprisoned, portrayed by Bruce Gordon, and appearing in far more episodes than any other gangster
- Joe Kulak, portrayed by Oscar Beregi
- Dutch Schultz, portrayed in different episodes by Lawrence Dobkin, Robert J. Wilke, and Warren J. Kemmerling
- Jake "Greasy Thumb" Guzik, portrayed in the pilot by Bern Hoffman, and in the series by Nehemiah Persoff
- George "Bugs" Moran, portrayed in different episodes by Lloyd Nolan, Robert J. Wilke, and Harry Morgan
- Louis Lepke Buchalter, portrayed in different episodes by Gene Roth, Robert Carricart, and Joseph Ruskin
- Lucky Luciano, portrayed by Robert Carricart
- Pete Konitz, portrayed by Carl Milletaire
- Frankie Resko, portrayed by Grant Richards
- Al Capone, portrayed by Neville Brand, and appearing only in the 2 hour pilot and a 2 part episode
- Louis Campagna, portrayed by Frank de Kova
- Augie Viale, portrayed by John Beradino
- Little Charlie Sebastino, portrayed by Henry Silva
- Louis Latito, portrayed by Joe De Santis
- Archie Devlin, Capone's attorney, portrayed by George N. Neise
- Lucky Quinn, portrayed by John Kellogg
- Joe Aiello portrayed in two episodes (where he's killed off in both episodes) by H. M. Wynant and Grant Richards
- Phil D'Andrea, portrayed by Wally Cassell, and appearing only in the pilot and premiere
- "Fur" Sammons, portrayed by Richard Benedict, and appearing only in the pilot and premiere
- Tony "Mops" Volpe, portrayed by Herman Rudin, and appearing only in the pilot and premiere

Finally, heard in every episode, but never shown onscreen:

- Announcer: Les Lampson
- Narrator: Walter Winchell

Paul Picerni and Nicholas Georgiade were cast as gangsters in Capone and Nitti's mob in the 1959 pilot before being cast in the series.

* Steve London's character of Untouchable Jack Rossman (played in the "Scarface Mob" pilot by Paul Dubov) was in the series since the original season-one series episode, "The Empty Chair", not from season two on as is commonly reported.

=== Guest stars ===
The Untouchables (due to Robert Stack's star power as a successful motion picture actor), was notable for the large number of past and future motion picture and television stars who signed and appeared as guest stars on the show during its four-year run. These include: (S#=Season number, E#=Episode number)

- Jay Adler in S1E9 "The Tri-State Gang", S2E9 "The Larry Fay Story", S3E8 "ManKiller", S4E3 "The Chess Game"
- Luther Adler in S2E3 "Nicky", S2E22 "Murder Under Glass", S3E17 "Takeover"
- Claude Akins in S1E20 "The Unhired Assassin" Part 1, S3E28 "The Monkey Wrench", S4E23 "The Spoiler"
- Sheldon Allman in S2E24 "Ring of Terror", S3E28 "The Monkey Wrench", S4E19 "An Eye for An Eye"
- John Anderson in S2E6 "A Seat on the Fence", S4E16 "Jake Dance", S4E28 "The Torpedo"
- Richard Anderson in S1E28 "The Frank Nitti Story"
- Edward Andrews in S1E25 "Portrait of a Thief"
- Michael Ansara in S2E3 "Nicky" and S2E16 "The Jamaica Ginger Story"
- Edward Asner in S3E16 "The Death Tree", S4E1 "The Night They Shot Santa Claus" and Frank in two episodes, S4E8 "Elegy", S4E13 "Search for a Dead Man"
- Val Avery in S1E26 "The Underworld Bank", S2E6 "A Seat on the Fence"
- Jim Backus in S1E15 "Star Witness"
- Richard Bakalyan in S1E16 "The St. Louis Story", S2E12 "The Big Train Part 1", S2E19 "The Nick Moses Story", S3E16 "The Death Tree", S4E17 "Blues for a Gone Goose", S4E29 "Line of Fire"
- Martin Balsam in S3E3 "Tunnel of Horrors", S3E21 "Man in the Middle"
- Joanna Barnes in S2E32 "90-Proof Dame"
- William Bendix in S1E9 "The Tri-State Gang"
- John Beradino in S1E0 Pilot, S1E3 "The Jake Lingle Killing", S1E17 "One-Armed Bandits"
- Oscar Beregi in S2E2 "Jack 'Legs' Diamond", S2E15 "The Organization", S2E27 "Stranglehold", S3E10 "Hammerlock", S3E15 "The Whitey Steele Story", S3E17 "Takeover", S3E25 "The Contract", S3E28 "The Monkey Wrench"
- Joseph Bernard in S3E5 "The Matt Bass Scheme", S3E18 "The Stryker Brothers"
- Edward Binns in S4E20 Junkman, S4E30 "A Taste for Pineapple"
- Whit Bissell in S1E11 "You Can't Pick the Number"
- Joan Blondell in S2E18 "The Underground Court"
- Scott Brady in S4E11 "The Floyd Gibbons Story"
- David Brian in S1E16 "The St. Louis Story", S2E23 "Testimony of Evil"
- Charles Bronson in S3E16 "The Death Tree"
- Robert Brubaker in S2E23 "Testimony of Evil"
- Joseph Buloff in S1E5 "Ain't We Got Fun"
- Victor Buono as Melanthos Moon in S2E25 "Mr. Moon" and as Parnise Surigao in S3E13 "The Gang War"
- Walter Burke in S2E24 "Ring of Terror", S4E18 "Globe of Death"
- Norman Burton in S2E32 "90-Proof Dame", S4E11 "The Floyd Gibbons Story"
- Delma Byron in S2E28 The Nero Rankin Story, S3E24 "The Ginnie Littlesmith Story"
- James Caan in S4E10 "A Fist of Five"
- Howard Caine in S2E24 "Ring of Terror, S2E29 "The Seventh Vote"
- Joseph Campanella in S4E11 "The Floyd Gibbons Story"
- Dyan Cannon in S3E14 "Silent Partner"
- J. D. Cannon in S4E2 "The Cooker in the Sky", S4E21 "The Man in the Cooler"
- Antony Carbone in S1E15 "Star Witness", S2E2 "Jack 'Legs' Diamond", S3E4 "The Genna Brothers", S4E13 "Search for a Dead Man"
- Timothy Carey in S1E5 "Ain't We Got Fun"
- Anthony Caruso in S1E13 "Syndicate Sanctuary"
- Fred Clark in S1E18 "little Egypt"
- Phyllis Coates in S1E5 "Ain't We Got Fun", S1E28 "The Frank Nitti Story", and S4E10 "A Fist of Five"
- James Coburn in S2E16 "The Jamaica Ginger Story"
- Steve Cochran in S2E7 "The Purple Gang", S2E32 "90-Proof Dame"
- Mike Connors in S4E7 "The Eddie O'Gara Story"
- Michael Constantine, in S2E19 "The Nick Moses Story", S2E30 "The King of Champagne", S3E5 "The Matt Bass Scheme", S4E3 "The Chess Game", S4E20 "Junkman"
- John Conte in S2E8 "Kiss of Death Girl"
- Richard Conte in S2E15 "The Organization", S4E3 "The Chess Game"
- Jeanne Cooper in S3E23 "The Case Against Eliot Ness", S4E24 "One Last Killing"
- Jeff Corey in S2E20 "The Antidote"
- Robert Cornthwaite in S2E23 "Testimony of Evil", S2E29 "The Seventh Vote"
- Norma Crane in S1E14 "The Noise of Death", S2E2 "Jack Legs Diamond", S2E21 "The Lily Dallas Story"
- Howard Culver in S2E29 "The Seventh Vote", S3E6 "Loophole", S3E19 "Element of Danger"
- Susan Cummings in S1E18 "Little Egypt"
- Dan Dailey in S4E9 "Come and Kill Me"
- Christopher Dark in S1E24 "The Doreen Maney Story", S4E26" The Charlie Argos Story"
- June Dayton in S2E16 "The Jamaica Ginger Story"
- Richard Deacon in S1E20 "The Unhired Assassin part 1"
- Ted de Corsia in S1E5 "Ain't We Got Fun", S4E9 "Come and Kill Me"
- John Dehner in S2E28 "The Nero Rankin Story"
- Joe De Santis in S1E12"The Underground Railway", S2E3 "Nicky", S2E19 "The Nick Moses Story", S4E20 "Junk Man", S4E29 "Line of Fire"
- Richard Devon in S2E18 "The Underground Court"
- Lawrence Dobkin as Dutch Schultz in S1E6 "Vincent 'Mad Dog' Call", S1E10 "The Dutch Schultz Story", S2E2 "Jack Legs Diamond"
- Dolores Dorn in S3E28 "The Monkey Wrench"
- Robert Duvall in S4E17 "Blues for a Gone Goose"
- Carole Eastman in S2E26 "Death for Sale"
- Vince Edwards in S1E7 "Mexican Stake Out"
- Jack Elam in S1E13 in "Syndicate Sanctuary", S2E23 "Testimony of Evil", S3E26 "Pressure"
- Robert Ellenstein in S1E8 "The Artichoke King", S1E14 "The Noise of Death", S4E27 "The Jazz Man"
- Robert Emhardt in S2E9 "The Larry Fay Story", S3E12 "Fall Guy", S4E27 "The Jazz Man"
- Peter Falk in S1E26 "The Underworld Bank", as Nate Selko in S3E1 "The Troubleshooter"
- Herbie Faye in S3E12 "Fall Guy"
- Norman Fell in S2E1 "The Rusty Heller Story"
- Frank Ferguson in S1E12 "The Underground Railway"
- Mary Fickett in S3E2 Power Play
- Betty Field in S1E22 "The White Slavers"
- Louise Fletcher in S1E2 "Ma Barker and Her Boys" as a girlfriend to one of Ma's boys
- Jay C. Flippen in S1E11 "You Can't Pick the Number", S3E12 "Fall Guy"
- Dick Foran in S1E28 "The Frank Nitti Story"
- Constance Ford in S2E31 "The Nick Acropolis Story"
- Anne Francis in S1E24 "The Doreen Maney Story"
- Dan Frazer in S4E24 "One Last Killing"
- Bert Freed in S1E23 "Three Thousand Suspects"
- Paul Frees as radio announcer uncredited in S1E21 "The Unhired Assassin": Part 2
- Peggy Ann Garner in S4E8 "Elegy", S4E25 "The Giant Killer"
- Larry Gates in S1E17 "One-Armed Bandit", S2E9 "The Larry Fay Story"
- Paul Genge in S2E23 "Testimony of Evil", S3E2 "Power Play", S4E2 "Cooker in the Sky"
- Robert Gist in S1E21 "The Unhired Assassin" Part 2
- Ned Glass in S1E23 "Three Thousand Suspects", S2E26 "Death for Sale", S3E1 "The Troubleshooter", S4E3 "The Chess Game"
- Don Gordon in S3E3 "Tunnel of Horror"s, S3E12 "Fall Guy", S3E24 "The Ginnie Littlesmith Story", S4E24 "One Last Killing"
- Leo Gordon in S1E16 "The St. Louis Story", S1E27 "Head of Fire: Feet of Clay"
- Harold Gould in S4E18 "Globe of Death"
- Dabbs Greer in S2E21 "The Lily Dallas Story", S3E11 "The Canada Run", S4E18 "Globe of Death"
- Harry Guardino in S1E17 "One-Armed Bandits", S2E19 "The Nick Moses Story", S3E25 "The Contract"
- Clu Gulager in S1E6 "Vincent 'Mad Dog' Coll"
- Kevin Hagen in S2E27 "Stranglehold", S3E27 "Arsenal"
- Alan Hale Jr. in S1E9 "The Tri-State Gang"
- Florence Halop in S1E9 "The Tri-State Gang"
- Robert H. Harris in S2E8 "Kiss of Death Girl"
- June Havoc in S2E9 "The Larry Fay Story"
- Anne Helm in S3E8 "Mankiller"
- Percy Helton in S1E16 "The St Louis Story", S1E21 "The Unhired Assassin Part 2"
- Darryl Hickman in S1E11 "You Can't Pick the Number", S3E26 "Pressure"
- Arthur Hill in S3E11 "The Canada Run"
- Marianna Hill in S4E10 "A Fist of Five"
- Steven Hill in S2E2 "Jack Legs Diamond", in S3E22 "Downfall"
- Connie Hines in S1E24 "The Doreen Maney Story"
- Sterling Holloway in S1E21 "The Unhired Assassin: Part 2"
- John Hoyt in S1E19 "The Big Squeeze"
- Anne Jackson in S4E2 "The Cooker in the Sky"
- Sam Jaffe in S2E17 "Augie 'The Banker' Ciamino"
- Salome Jens in S3E27 Arsenal, S4E21 "The Man in the Cooler"
- Henry Jones in S1E25 "Portrait of a Thief"
- Victor Jory in S3E19 "Element of Danger"
- Bernard Kates in S1E26 "The Underworld Bank", S2E17 "Augie 'The Banker' Ciamino"
- Brian Keith in S2E16 "The Jamaica Ginger Story"
- Mike Kellin in S1E14 "The Noise of Death", S1E22 "The White Slavers", S3E9 "City Without a Name"
- John Kellogg in S3E13 "Gang War", S3E20 "The Maggie Storm Story", S4E2 "Doublecross"
- George Kennedy as 'Birdie' the mute in S2E30 "The King of Champagne"
- Werner Klemperer in S2E7 "The Purple Gang"
- Jack Klugman in S3E6 "Loophole", S4E19 "An Eye for an Eye"
- Gail Kobe in S1E13 "Syndicate Sanctuary", S4E28 "The Torpedo"
- Jack Kruschen in S1E4 "The George 'Bugs' Moran Story"
- Will Kuluva in S2E5 "The Mark of Cain", S2E17 "Augie 'The Banker' Ciamino", S2E28 "The Nero Rankin Story", S3E10 "Hammerlock", S4E17 "Blues for a Gone Goose"
- John Larkin in S3E25 "The Contract", S4E22 "The Butcher's Boy"
- Wesley Lau in S2E8 "Kiss of Death Girl"
- Martin Landau in S1E7 "Mexican Stakeout", S3E6 "Loophole"
- Marc Lawrence in S1E15 "Star Witness", S3E4 "The Genna Brothers", S4E17 "Blues for a Gone Goose"
- Cloris Leachman in S3E7 "Jigsaw", S3E21 "Man in the Middle"
- Len Lesser in S2E6 "A Seat on the Fence"
- Sam Levene in S2E9 "The Larry Fay Story"
- Viveca Lindfors S2E24 "Ring of Terror"
- Jack Lord in S1E3 "The Jake Lingle Killing"
- Phyllis Love in S3E24 "The Ginnie Littlesmith Story"
- Barbara Luna in S1E7 Mexican Stake Out, S3E16 "The Death Tree"
- Gene Lyons in S2E6 "A Seat on the Fence"
- James MacArthur in S2E26 "Death for Sale"
- Gavin MacLeod as a minor criminal with almost the exact same last name of "McLeod" in S1E9 "The Tri State Gang", also S2E12 & S2E13 "The Big Train" Part One & Two, S3E6 "Loophole", and S3E21 "Man in the Middle"
- Arthur Malet in S3E26 "Pressure", S4E25 "The Giant Killer"
- Dorothy Malone in S4E11 "The Floyd Gibbons Story"
- Joe Mantell as George Ricci (Brandy LaFrance's husband) in the 2-hour pilot, and as Giuseppe Zangara in S1E20 & S1E21 "The Unhired Assassin" part 1 & 2
- Theodore Marcuse in S1E17 "One-Armed Bandits", S3E9 "City Without a Name", S3E16 "The Death Tree", S4E6 "Bird in the Hand", S4E29 "Line of Fire"
- John Marley in S1E18 "Little Egypt", S2E23 "Testimony of Evil"
- Nan Martin in S4E6 "Bird in the Hand"
- George Matthews in S3E27 "Aresnal", S4E4 "The Economist"
- Lee Marvin in S2E31 "The Nick Acropolis Story", S3E19 "Element of Danger", S4E10 "A Fist of Five"
- Paul Mazursky in S3E11 "The Canada Run"
- Sean McClory in S3E15 "The Whitey Steele Story", S4E7 "The Eddie O'Gara Story"
- Charles McGraw in S1E3 "The Jake Lingle Killing", S1E25 "Portrait of a Thief", S3E14 "Silent Partner", S4E28 "The Torpedo"
- John McIntire in S2E6 "A Seat on the Fence"
- Emile Meyer in S3E11 "The Canada Run"
- Robert Middleton as Mayor Anton Cermak in S1E20 & S1E21 "The Unhired Assassin" parts 1 & 2, also S2E14 "The Masterpiece", S2E30 "The King of Champagne"
- Cameron Mitchell in S1E5 "Ain't We Got Fun"
- Thomas Mitchell in S1E26 "The Underworld Bank"
- Ricardo Montalbán in S2E27 "Stranglehold"
- Elizabeth Montgomery as Rusty Heller (received a nomination for the 13th Primetime Emmy Award for an "Outstanding Performance in a Supporting Role by an Actor or Actress in a Single Program") S2/E1 "The Rusty Heller Story" (1960)
- Joanna Moore in S2E28 "The Nero Rankin Story"
- Harry Morgan as Bugs Moran in S4E12 "Doublecross"
- Vic Morrow in S2E11 "The Tommy Karpeles Story", S3E20 "The Maggie Storm Story"
- George Murdock in S3E23 "The Case Against Eliot Ness", S4E19 "An Eye for An Eye"
- J. Carrol Naish in S1E14 "The Noise of Death"
- Patricia Neal in S3E20 "The Maggie Storm Story"
- Ed Nelson in S2E21 "The Lily Dallas Story", S3E13 "The Gang War", S4E29 "Line of Fire"
- Barbara Nichols in Pilot of The Untouchables, S1E1 "The Empty Chair"
- Leslie Nielsen in S1E23 "Three Thousand Suspects", who later co-starred with Robert Stack in Airplane!, satirizing their serious roles in dramas like The Untouchables
- Leonard Nimoy in S3E17 "Takeover"
- Sheree North in S4E13 "Search for a Dead Man"
- Simon Oakland in S3E11 "The Canada Run", S3E22 "Downfall", S4E27 "The Jazzman"
- Warren Oates in S3E26 "Pressure"
- Carroll O'Connor in S3E2 "Power Play", S4E6 "Bird in the Hand"
- Dan O'Herlihy in S1E19 "The Big Squeeze"
- Susan Oliver in S2E15 "The Organization"
- Ryan O'Neal in S2E2 "Jack 'Legs' Diamond"
- Cliff Osmond in S3E28 "The Monkey Wrench", S4E18 "Globe of Death"
- Patricia Owens in S4E26 "The Charlie Argos Story"
- Woodrow Parfrey in S4E8 "Elegy", S4E24 "One Last Killing"
- Larry Parks in S2E21 "The Lilly Dallas Story"
- Michael Parks in S2E23 "Testimony of Evil"
- Dennis Patrick in S2E22 "Murder Under Glass"
- Albert Paulsen in S4E5 "The Pea"
- Vic Perrin in S2E5 "The Mark of Cain", S2E18 "The Underground Court", S3E9 "City Without a Name", S4E25 "The Giant Killer"
- Nehemiah Persoff as Jake "Greasy Thumb" Guzik in three episodes, S1E1 "The Empty Chair", S2E29 "The Seventh Vote", S4E12 "Doublecross", also S1E27 "Head of Fire- Feet of Clay", S2E4 "The Waxey Gordon Story", S3E18 "The Stryker Brothers"
- Lee Phillips in S2E17 "Augie 'The Banker' Ciamino"
- Philip Pine in S1E3 "The Jake Lingle Killing", S2E3 "Nicky", S2E27 "Stranglehold" S3E15 "The Whitey Steele Story", S4E18 "Globe of Death"
- Sydney Pollack in S2E12 "The Big Train" Part One
- Sherwood Price in S4E29 "Line of Fire"
- Ford Rainey in S4E9 "Come and Kill Me", S4E29 "Line of Fire"
- Robert Redford in S4E15 "Snowball"
- Marge Redmond in S4E25 "The Giant Killer"
- Madlyn Rhue in S1E27 "Head of Fire- Feet of Clay", S2E11 "The Tommy Karpeles Story"
- Paul Richards in S3E9 "City Without a Name", S4E25 "The Giant Killer"
- Cliff Robertson in S1E12 "The Underground Railway"
- Ruth Roman in S3E8 "Man Killer"
- Marion Ross in S1E10 "The Dutch Schultz Story"
- Al Ruscio in S1E8 "The Artichoke King", S3E19 "Element of Danger", S4E23 "The Spoiler"
- Joseph Ruskin in S1E7 "Mexican Stake-Out", S2E14 "The Masterpiece", S2E29 "The Seventh Vote", S3E3 "Tunnel of Horrors", S3E20 "The Maggie Storm Story", S4E17 "Blues for a Gone Goose"
- Albert Salmi in S3E2 "Power Play"
- Telly Savalas in S2E20 "The Antidote", S3E5 "The Matt Bass Scheme", S4E14 "The Speculator"
- Arline Sax in S2E6 "A Seat on the Fence", S2E32 "90-Proof Dame", S3E4 "The Genna Brothers"
- Milton Selzer in S2E15 "The Organization", S3E5 "The Matt Bass Scheme", S3E22 "Downfall", S4E2 "Cooker in the Sky"
- Johnny Seven in S1E10 "The Dutch Schultz Story", S2E23 "Testimony of Evil", S2E31 "The Nick Acropolis Story", S3E27 Arsenal, S4E24 "One Last Killing"
- Dan Seymour in S1E23 "Three Thousand Suspects", S2E19 "The Nick Moses Story", S2E28 "The Nero Rankin Story", S4E12 "Doublecross"
- Mickey Shaughnessy in S2E8 "Kiss of Death Girl"
- Henry Silva as Little Charlie Sebastino in two episodes, S1E14 "The Noise of Death", S2E5 "The Mark of Cain", also S3E15 "The Whitey Steele Story"
- Frank Silvera in S2E6 "A Seat on the Fence"
- Robert F. Simon in S1E13 "Syndicate Sanctuary", S2E12 "The Big Train": Part 1
- Joseph Sirola in S4E4 "The Economist"
- Jeremy Slate in S1E22 "The White Slavers", S4E30 "A Taste for Pineapple"
- Fay Spain in S2E23 "Testimony of Evil"
- Barbara Stanwyck in S4E8 Elegy, S4E13 "Search for a Dead Man"
- Warren Stevens in S2E32 "90-Proof Dame"
- Harold J. Stone in S2E1 "The Rusty Heller Story", S2E11 "The Tommy Karples Story", S2E24 "Ring of Terror", S3E10 "Hammerlock", S3E26 "Pressure", S4E24 "One Last Killing"
- Leonard Stone in S2E31 "The Nick Acropolis Story"
- Suzanne Storrs in S1E6 Vincent 'Mad Dog' Coll, S2E2 "Jack 'Legs' Diamond"
- Michael Strong in S3E18 "The Stryker Brothers"
- Frank Sutton in S3E18 "The Stryker Brothers", S3E25 "The Contract", S4E14 "The Speculator", S4E22 "The Butcher's Boy"
- Karl Swenson in S2E25 "Mr. Moon", S3E27 "Arsenal"
- Nita Talbot in S1E22 "The White Slavers", S4E1 "The Night They Shot Santa Claus"
- Gloria Talbott in S3E25 "The Contract"
- Vaughn Taylor in S1E2 "Ma Barker and Her Boys", S2E24 "Ring of Terror", S3E6 "Loophole"
- Malachi Throne in S4E4 "The Economist", S4E12 "Doublecross", S4E18 "Globe of Death"
- George Tobias in S3E6 "Loophole"
- Rip Torn in S2E14 "The Masterpiece", S4E23 "The Spoiler"
- Claire Trevor as Ma Barker in S1E2 "Ma Barker and Her Boys"
- Lee Van Cleef in S1E20 & E21 "The Unhired Assassin" parts 1 & 2
- Joyce Van Patten in S4E23 "The Spoiler"
- Robert Vaughn in S4E26 "The Charlie Argos Story"
- Virginia Vincent in S1E12 "The Underground Railway", S1E26 "The Underworld Bank"
- Jack Warden in S1E4 "The George 'Bugs' Moran Story", S1E27 "Head of Fire-Feet of Clay", S2E10 "The Otto Frick Story"
- Linda Watkins in S2E21 "The Lily Dallas Story"
- Rebecca Welles in S2E17 "Augie 'The Banker' Ciamino"
- Jack Weston in S1E8 "The Artichoke King"
- Christine White in S1E11 "You Can't Pick the Number"
- David White in S1E10 "The Dutch Schultz Story", and S2E1 "The Rusty Heller Story"; in the latter, appearing with his later Bewitched colleague Elizabeth Montgomery
- Ruth White in S4E1 "The Night They Shot Santa Claus"
- Peter Whitney in S2E2 "Jack Legs Diamond", S4E21 "Man in The Cooler"
- Adam Williams in S1E2 "Ma Barker and Her Boys", S4E15 "The Snowball"
- Jason Wingreen in S2E5 "The Mark of Cain", S2E14 "The Masterpiece", S2E20 "The Antidote", S2E30 "The King of Champagne", S3E5 "The Matt Bass Scheme", S4E5 "The Pea", S4E7 "The Eddie O'Gara Story", S4E28 "The Torpedo"
- Than Wyenn in S3E11 "The Canada Run", S4E20 "Junk Man"
- H. M. Wynant in S1E3 "The Jake Lingle Killing", S4E22 "The Butcher's Boy"
- Dick York in S1E22 "The White Slavers"
- Francine York in S4E22 "The Butcher's Boy"

== Episodes ==
Season	Episodes	Originally released	
Season	Episodes	First released	Last released
Pilot		April 20, 1959	April 27, 1959
1	28	October 15, 1959	April 28, 1960
2	32	October 13, 1960	June 8, 1961
3	28	October 12, 1961	July 5, 1962
4	30	September 25, 1962	May 21, 1963

== Broadcast history ==
The Untouchables originally aired as a segment of the anthology series Desilu Playhouse in 1959. It was picked up as a regular series by ABC for the 1959 season and was aired on Thursdays from 9:30 to 10:30pm from 1959 to 1962, switching to Tuesday evenings from 9:30 to 10:30pm for its final season (1962–63).

Desilu Productions president Desi Arnaz had originally offered the role of Ness to Van Johnson. Johnson's wife and manager rejected the deal and demanded double the salary offer. Arnaz refused and signed Stack instead. Arnaz had had a long business relationship with CBS, which had aired many Desilu programs, including I Love Lucy and The Lucy–Desi Comedy Hour. When CBS refused to buy the program, Arnaz sold it to ABC.

Neville Brand reprised his role as Al Capone in the 1961 film The George Raft Story.

Some segments were released to theaters as movies: The Scarface Mob (from the two-part pilot), The Alcatraz Express (from "The Big Train"), and The Gun of Zangara (from "Unhired Assassin").

On November 10, 1991, NBC ran the two-hour film The Return of Eliot Ness, with Robert Stack as Ness. It was set in 1947, after Capone's death, and depicted Ness investigating the death of an Untouchables agent named Labine.

== Legacy ==
The Untouchables was a landmark television series that has spawned numerous imitators over the decades, such as S.W.A.T., The F.B.I., Crime Story, the original Hawaii Five-O (Five-O's creator and executive producer, Leonard Freeman, served as executive producer on The Untouchables' final season), Robert Stack's two later series, Strike Force and Most Wanted, The Hat Squad, and the 1993 The Untouchables syndicated TV series.

It also inspired films such as Al Capone starring Rod Steiger, The Untouchables (with Kevin Costner), Gangster Squad, Mulholland Falls, and others. The Untouchables is one of two series from 1959, the other being Robert Taylor’s The Detectives, together credited with the concept of depicting a group of crime fighters. Previously, most TV crime dramas had followed one of two formats: either a duo composed of a stalwart police officer or detective and his trusty sidekick/partner (Dragnet, The Lineup), or a lone-wolf private eye or police detective (Peter Gunn, Richard Diamond, M-Squad).

In 1997, the episode "The Rusty Heller Story" was ranked number 99 on TV Guide's 100 Greatest Episodes of All Time.

=== Assessments of cultural impact ===
In their 1988 book, The Critics' Choice—The Best of Crime and Detective TV, authors Max Allan Collins and John Javna chose The Untouchables as one of the "Top 10 Best Police TV Series (Police Procedurals) of All Time".

The Lebanon (Pa.) Daily News said of The Untouchables: "Between the hard-nosed approach, sharp dialogue, and a commendably crisp pace (something rare in dramatic TV at the time), this series is one of the few that remains fresh and vibrant. Only the monochrome presentation betrays its age. The Untouchables is one of the few Golden Age TV shows that deserves being called a classic."

In 2019, a 60th Anniversary Retrospective titled The Untouchables Retrospective was undertaken to celebrate the show's cultural impact and legacy in television and film history through mixed media, including extensive episode reviews, a podcast, and a making-of documentary. To date, the retrospective has interviewed several surviving participants involved with the program, including Pat Crowley and Nehemiah Persoff.

=== In popular culture ===
In Billy Wilder's Academy Award-winning 1960 movie The Apartment, a corporate telephone operator being romanced by an executive objects to the rescheduling of a tryst as it will conflict with the broadcasting of The Untouchables.

Warner Bros. Cartoons spoofed the Untouchables series in the 1963 Merrie Melodies cartoon short The Unmentionables, with Bugs Bunny playing the role of Elegant Mess, a crime fighter assigned to infiltrate a black market ring operated by Rocky and Mugsy.

The series was also spoofed on an episode of the 1961-62 ABC-TV/Hanna-Barbera cartoon series Top Cat entitled "The Unscratchables".

In a 1963 on another ABC-TV/Hanna-Barbera cartoon, The Jetsons, in an episode where Elroy Jetson runs away from home, a group of mobsters was conning both Elroy and his dog "Astro" they are producing a TV show called "The Unspaceables" to cover up a robbery they committed in front of Elroy and Astro.

NBC's Saturday Night Live spoofed The Untouchables several times during the 1970s, with Dan Aykroyd playing Eliot Ness. Incidentally, Aykroyd would parody another popular TV police procedural from the era, Dragnet, in 1987, which co-starred Tom Hanks.

On a 1981 telecast of NBC-TV's The Tonight Show, The Untouchables was spoofed with a skit entitled: "The Video Untouchables", with host Johnny Carson portraying Agent "Eliot Nielsen", whose squad apprehended citizens who unlawfully videotaped TV programs. The video survives today on YouTube.

== Home media ==
=== Region 1 ===
CBS DVD (distributed by Paramount Home Entertainment) have released all four seasons of The Untouchables on DVD in region 1, all digitally remastered from the original negatives and presented uncut, unedited and in its original broadcast order. The first two seasons have also been released in region 4.

On May 10, 2016, CBS DVD released The Untouchables- The Complete Series on DVD in Region 1.

DVD Name	Ep #	Release dates	
DVD Name	Ep #	Region 1	Region 4
Season 1- Volume 1	14 + pilot	April 10, 2007	September 30, 2009
Season 1- Volume 2	14	September 25, 2007	September 30, 2009
Season 2- Volume 1	16	March 18, 2008	September 30, 2009
Season 2- Volume 2	16	August 26, 2008	September 30, 2009
Season 3- Volume 1	16	August 25, 2009	N/A
Season 3- Volume 2	12	November 10, 2009	N/A
Season 4- Volume 1	15	July 24, 2012	N/A
Season 4- Volume 2	15	July 24, 2012	N/A
The Complete Series	118	May 10, 2016	N/A

=== Region 2 ===
Paramount Home Entertainment released the first three seasons of The Untouchables on DVD in the UK. These releases are full-season sets as opposed to Region 1 and 4, where each season has been split into two volumes. The complete series (all 4 seasons) was released on DVD in the UK on May 29, 2017 by Medium Rare Entertainment.

DVD name	Ep #	Release date
Season 1	28	August 18, 2008
Season 2	32	September 14, 2009
Season 3	28	September 20, 2010
Season 4	30	N/A

== Merchandising ==
The TV show was also adapted into a comic book by Dan Spiegle, distributed by Dell Comics.
