= Mackenzie's Raiders =

American television series

- Genre: Western
- Written by: Stephen Alexander; Robert Leslie Bellem; Richard Carlson; William Driskill; Milton S. Gelman; Paul Savage; Barney Slater; Charles B. Smith; Irwin Winehouse; A. Sanford Wolfe; Jim Thompson
- Directed by: Derwin Abrahams; Franklin Adreon; Abner Biberman; Richard Carlson; Eddie Davis; Herman Hoffman; Lew Landers
- Starring: Richard Carlson; Don Eitner
- Narrated by: Art Gilmore
- Composer: David Rose
- Country of origin: United States
- Original language: English
- No. of seasons: 1
- No. of episodes: 39

Production
- Producers: Lou Breslow; Elliott Lewis
- Cinematography: Robert Hoffman; Charles Van Enger
- Editors: Charles L. Freeman; Stanford Tischler
- Running time: 30 mins. (approx)
- Production company: Ziv Television Programs

Original release
- Network: Syndication
- Release: October 1, 1958 – 1959

Mackenzie's Raiders is an American Western television series starring Richard Carlson that was broadcast in syndication and produced in 1958–1959. The series is narrated by Art Gilmore, and was produced by Ziv Television Programs.

== Synopsis ==
The basis for the program was Mackenzie's Raid, a book by Russell P. Reeder. It told about a 32-hour raid by Mackenzie and 550 cavalrymen to destroy a Mexican town that harbored kidnappers, rustlers, and arsonists.

Set in the 1870s, Mackenzie's Raiders depicted activities of the Fourth Cavalry around the Rio Grande and the Mexican border. Experiences of Union Army Col. Ranald S. Mackenzie formed the basis for episodes.

Mackenzie, with orders from President Grant, operated out of Fort Clark, in Texas, "to rid the Southwest of Mexican marauders and renegade Indians, pursuing them across the Rio Grande if necessary." If Mckenzie were to be caught in a foreign country, the United States would deny knowledge of his mission.

== Cast ==
- Richard Carlson as Colonel Ranald S. Mackenzie (39 episodes)
- Don Eitner/Charles Boaz as Corporal Dixon (11 episodes)
- Kenneth Alton as Raider (11 episodes)
- Morris Ankrum as Raider (12 episodes)
- Jim Bridges as Private Lewis (11 episodes)
- Louis Jean Heydt as Raider (11 episodes)
- Brett King as Raider (11 episodes)

=== Guest stars ===
- Robert Anderson
- John Archer
- Jim Bannon
- Jeanne Bates
- Rand Brooks (multiple appearances)
- Harry Carey, Jr.
- Iron Eyes Cody
- Walter Coy
- Ted de Corsia
- John Doucette
- Jack Elam
- Jack Ging (multiple appearances)
- John Goddard
- Steve Gravers
- Virginia Gregg
- Robert Griffin
- Brett Halsey (as Lt. Summers)
- Robert Karnes
- DeForest Kelley
- Ray Kellogg
- Gail Kobe
- Bethel Leslie (as Lucinda Cabot)
- Len Lesser
- Forrest Lewis
- Judy Lewis
- Steve London
- Herbert Lytton
- Walter Maslow
- Rod McGaughy
- Robert McQueeney
- Dennis Moore (multiple appearances)
- Burt Mustin (as Mr. Devin)
- Anna Navarro
- Leonard Nimoy
- Vic Perrin
- Glenn Strange
- Robert Tetrick
- Joe Turkel
- John Vivyan
- Alan Wells
- H. M. Wynant

== Critical response ==
John P. Shanley, writing in The New York Times, complimented the show's "realistic settings and good photography" and added, "It was a better-than-average adventure show."

== Episodes ==
No.	Title	Original release date
1	"Night Raid"	October 10, 1958
2	"The Long Day"	October 17, 1958
3	"Death by the Numbers"	October 24, 1958
4	"Indian Agent"	October 31, 1958
5	"Deadly Mirror"	November 7, 1958
6	"Attack"	November 14, 1958
7	"Hostage"	November 21, 1958
8	"Eastern Colonel"	November 28, 1958
9	"The Renegade (aka Pistol Whipped)"	December 5, 1958
10	"Dream of Empire"	December 13, 1958
11	"The Plague (aka Cholera)"	December 20, 1958
12	"Broken Treaty (aka Quanah Parker)"	December 27, 1958
13	"The Imposter"	January 3, 1959
14	"Apache Boy"	January 10, 1959
15	"Blood on the Rio"	January 17, 1959
16	"Murder is the Bid"	January 24, 1959
17	"Thunder Stick"	January 31, 1959
18	"Terror in Chuma Valley"	February 7, 1959
19	"Raid on San Rodrigo"	February 14, 1959
20	"Violent Sanctuary"	February 21, 1959
21	"The Scalp Hunters"	February 28, 1959
22	"Son of the Hawk"	March 7, 1959
23	"The Pen and the Sword"	March 14, 1959
24	"The Poisoners"	March 21, 1959
25	"The Lost Raider"	March 28, 1959
26	"The Fast Gun"	April 4, 1959
27	"Mutiny"	April 11, 1959
28	"The Court Martial of Trooper Davis"	April 18, 1959
29	"Joe Ironhat"	April 25, 1959
30	"Drought"	May 2, 1959
31	"Uprising"	May 9, 1959
32	"Desertion"	May 16, 1959
33	"Deadlock"	May 23, 1959
34	"Lucinda Cabot"	May 30, 1959
35	"Missing--Presumed Dead (aka Captured in Mexico)"	June 6, 1959
36	"Death Patrol (aka Long Ride Home)"	June 13, 1959
37	"Ambush"	June 20, 1959
38	"Death Road"	June 27, 1959
39	"Devil Trap"	July 4, 1959

== Production notes ==
Prior to Mackenzie's Raiders, Carlson had previously starred in another Ziv Productions series, I Led Three Lives.

The series was produced by Lou Breslow and Elliott Lewis. Carlson also served as a writer and director. Jim Thompson was credited with writing four episodes of the show.

Location shots were filmed along the Santa Ana River in California, an area that resembles that of the Rio Grande.

The series is currently being shown on the over the air channel ThisTV.

== DVD release ==
On October 8, 2013, Timeless Media Group released Mackenzie's Raiders- The TV Series on DVD in Region 1 for the very first time.
