= Steve London =

American actor

- Born: Walter Lee Gragg; March 9, 1929; St. Louis, Missouri, U.S.
- Died: June 14, 2014 (aged 85); Pasadena, California, U.S.
- Occupations: Actor; attorney

Steve London (born Walter Lee Gragg; March 9, 1929 – June 14, 2014) was an American television and film actor and attorney, best known for his role as federal agent Jack Rossman on the ABC/Desilu television series The Untouchables (1959–1963).

== Early years ==
Born Walter Lee Gragg in St. Louis, Missouri, he entered the United States Naval Academy in the summer of 1948 and played football there. In 1951, he was selected as a tackle on the 24-member East team in the 27th East–West Shrine Game.

He was commissioned a second lieutenant in the Air Force, specializing in electronics. After leaving the Air Force, he worked as an engineer for Hughes Aircraft and owned a rug-cleaning business.

== Career ==
London was active in stock theater in southern California.

He was a veteran of numerous Hollywood film and television roles, including parts on Daniel Boone, M Squad, Sky King, Lock-Up, The Loretta Young Show, Sugarfoot, Mission: Impossible, Kraft Suspense Theatre, Branded, and Mackenzie's Raiders. Film roles included Dead Heat on a Merry-Go-Round (1966), I Married a Monster from Outer Space (1958), Zero Hour! (1957), The Gun of Zangara, and Alcatraz Express, the later two being two-part episodes of The Untouchables that were re-edited into feature films for international distribution.

In The Untouchables, Rossman was the squad's wiretap specialist. In one episode, he was described by series narrator Walter Winchell as "Agent Jack Rossman -- former telephone company lineman, wiretap expert, and a locksmith so talented that "Rossman could open everything but the Pearly Gates." In the series, Rossman's weapon of choice was the 12 gauge pump-action shotgun, which he used to deadly effect. London appeared in 65 episodes of The Untouchables as Rossman.

Several years after the cancellation of The Untouchables, London appeared in a special episode of The Lucy Show entitled "Lucy The Gun Moll", an Untouchables reunion of sorts, where he reprised his role as sidekick to Robert Stack. Actor Bruce Gordon who played Frank Nitti in the series, also appeared in this episode, and The Untouchables narrator Walter Winchell served as narrator for this episode.

After 1966, his acting career waned, so he left Hollywood, finished law school, and began practicing law under his birth name. Many years later, London returned to acting, where he played roles in the Cartoon Network television series Tim and Eric Awesome Show, Great Job!, (2007), and the film Brothers War (2009).

== Personal life ==
On October 7, 1953, London married actress Sandra Gregg, and they had two children. They were divorced on October 28, 1957.

In 1982, he married his second wife Judith, and they resided in Pasadena, California, until his death on June 14, 2014, at the age of 83.

== Filmography ==
Year	Title	Role	Notes
1957	Zero Hour!	First Officer Walt Stewart	
1958	I Married a Monster from Outer Space	Charles Mason	
1966	Dead Heat on a Merry-Go-Round	Airline Clerk	Uncredited
2009	Brothers at War	Old Klaus	(final film role)
