= Ghost of Dragstrip Hollow =

- Film poster
- Directed by: William J. Hole, Jr.
- Written by: Lou Rusoff
- Produced by: Lou Rusoff
- Starring: Jody Fair; Russ Bender; Henry McCrann; Martin Braddock; Paul Blaisdell
- Cinematography: Gil Warrenton
- Edited by: Frank P. Keller
- Music by: Ronald Stein
- Production company: Alta Vista Productions
- Distributed by: American International Pictures
- Release date: July 1959
- Running time: 65 minutes
- Country: United States
- Language: English

Ghost of Dragstrip Hollow is a 1959 AIP horror comedy film. It was a sequel to their film Hot Rod Gang. American International Pictures released the film in July 1959 as a double feature with Diary of a High School Bride.

The film spoofed the 1950s monster and drag racing films of AIP, and has been regarded as a forerunner of the 1960s Beach Party films. Spoofs like this film helped bring a close to AIP's 1950s low-budget horror film genre. This was the last monster movie that special effects technician Paul Blaisdell worked on.

== Plot ==
After being evicted from their old clubhouse, members of a Los Angeles drag racing club move into an old deserted mansion and set up shop, making it their new headquarters. For the club's grand opening, they hold a Halloween masked ball and invite everyone to come dressed as their favorite monster.

The festivities take an unexpected turn when one of the youths discovers an imposter among them: a real live monster (AIP's oft-reused She-Creature costume, played by its real-life creator Paul Blaisdell), who has been mixing in with the kids, hogging all the dances with the best-looking girls. The phony monster is unmasked at the end of the film by one of the teenagers, revealing it to be AIP's special effects maestro Paul Blaisdell.

Blaisdell cries, looking frail and tiny in the oversized costume, and complains into the camera: "You've seen me before. I scared you to death in The Day the World Ended. You shivered when you saw me in She-Creature. Oh the shame of it, the indignity! They didn't use me in Horrors of the Black Museum after my years of faithful service. They just... threw me away!" The kids then chase him out of the house and continue partying.

Ironically, Blaisdell never worked on another film after Dragstrip Hollow, making his comedic speech in the film seem sadly prophetic in hindsight.

== Cast ==
- Jody Fair as Lois Cavendish
- Russ Bender as Tom Hendry
- Henry McCann as Dave
- Martin Braddock as Stan
- Elaine DuPont as Rhonda
- Jack Ging as Tony
- Tommy Ivo as himself
- Paul Blaisdell as man in Monster Suit

== Production ==
Paul Blaisdell, AIP's top special effects technician from 1954 to 1959, was asked to spoof himself in the film, not realizing how close the film's ending would parallel the end of his own career a year or two later.

== Home media ==
The film was released on DVD by MGM on February 15, 2005.

== Reception ==
TV Guide panned the film, stating that "[the] deformed script could have only been helped by a complete rewrite". On his website Fantastic Movie Musings and Ramblings, Dave Sindelar criticized the film's "turgid pacing", lack of plot, and underdeveloped scenarios. Dennis Schwartz of Ozus' World Movie Reviews rated the film a grade D, writing, "A dreadful hot rod teen comedy for the drive-in crowd. This one stinks even for AIP."

Filmink called it "a boring movie".

== See also ==
- List of American films of 1959
- Paul Blaisdell
