= Girls in Prison (1956 film) =

1956 film by Edward L. Cahn

- Theatrical release poster by Albert Kallis
- Directed by: Edward L. Cahn
- Written by: Lou Rusoff
- Produced by: Alex Gordon
- Starring: Richard Denning; Joan Taylor; Mae Marsh; Adele Jergens; Helen Gilbert
- Cinematography: Frederick E. West
- Edited by: Ronald Sinclair
- Music by: Ronald Stein
- Production company: Golden State Pictures
- Distributed by: American International Pictures
- Release date: July 1956
- Running time: 87 minutes
- Country: United States
- Language: English

Girls in Prison is a 1956 American sexploitation women in prison drama film about a young woman who is convicted of being an accomplice to a bank robbery and is sent to an all-female prison. The film was directed by Edward L. Cahn, and stars Richard Denning, Joan Taylor, and Mae Marsh. American International Pictures released the film as a double feature with Hot Rod Girl.

== Plot ==
Anne Carson is sent to a women's prison for allegedly participating in a bank robbery with two others, one, Paul Anderson who is still at large. The money was never recovered and all eyes are on Anne who denies knowing about the money.

On arrival in prison, Anne meets the outwardly tough matron in charge and the prison chaplain Rev Fulton who feels Anne may have had a mistrial and does not belong in prison. Anne's cellmates are Jenny who seems to run the inmates, Melanee who makes a play for Anne, and Dorothy a woman who has murdered her own husband and child when he ran away with another woman who is still alive. The unhinged Dorothy believes her child is still alive and every new girl in prison is her husband's lover, Lois. Jenny and Melanee team up in the "good cop/bad cop" routine to get Anne to tell them where the money is with Melanee telling Dorothy that Anne is really Lois.

On the outside, Paul is using blackmail and threats on Anne's ex-criminal father Pop Carson to find the money as well as offering to split it with him 50/50.

Anne faces attempted murder by Dorothy, threats on her life from two other inmates seeking the money, and fights Melanee in a catfight. When a large earthquake hits the area and demolishes the installation, Jenny (who has acquired a pistol from her outside contacts and the outwardly harmless trustee Grandma) and Melanee use the opportunity to escape with Anne to take her home to locate the money.

The downed telephone and power lines give the three girls time to escape unpursued, but Melanee is killed when Jenny and Anne take a stolen vehicle and leave her behind. When they arrive at Anne's home, Pop is still held at gunpoint by Paul. Anne admits that she hid the money and hands it over. When the Reverend arrives, Jenny is killed by Paul, but the Reverend manages to wrestle and subdue Paul down before the police arrive. Anne accepts returning to prison.

Since the film's release in 1956, the theatrical movie poster, featuring a catfight between Helen Gilbert and Joan Taylor, has become a collector's item. The poster shows the blonde haired Gilbert strangling the dark haired Taylor although that exact scene did not occur in the movie.

== Cast ==
- Richard Denning as Rev. Fulton
- Joan Taylor as Anne Carson
- Adele Jergens as Jenny
- Helen Gilbert as Melanee
- Lance Fuller as Paul Anderson
- Jane Darwell as Matron Jamieson
- Raymond Hatton as Pop Carson
- Phyllis Coates as Dorothy
- Diana Darrin as Meg - Short Redhead
- Mae Marsh as 'Grandma' Edwards
- Laurie Mitchell as Phyllis - Tall Blonde
- Luana Walters as Cellblock Guard
- Riza Royce as Party Chaperone Guard
- Lottie Salisbury as Pianist at Party
- Edmund Cobb as Work-Gang Guard
- Jeanne Evans as New Girl in Laundry (Stoolie)
- Mari Finley as Mari
- Diane Richards as Nightclub Singer
- Kermit Maynard as Prison Guard

== Production ==
This was the first of many films that Edward L. Cahn did for AIP with producer Alex Gordon. A Production Code administrator warned Gordon that any hint of lesbianism whether in speech or manners had to be eliminated from the script, but Gordon filmed them regardless. Gordon's film company Golden State Productions made the first film released by AIP, Apache Woman also starring Joan Taylor.

Denning was paid a percentage of the profits.

== Critical reception ==
Writing in AllMovie, author and critic Hal Erickson described the film as "a typical babes-behind-bars affair, elevated by a better than usual cast," noting that "veteran thespians [...] make worthwhile contributions to the proceedings."

== Remake ==
Cinedigm announced a remake in 2015 (along with 10 other American International Pictures properties).
