= The Oklahoma Woman =

1956 film by Roger Corman

- Theatrical release poster
- Directed by: Roger Corman
- Written by: Lou Rusoff
- Produced by: Alex Gordon
- Starring: Peggie Castle; Richard Denning; Cathy Downs; Mike Connors; Dick Miller
- Cinematography: Frederick E. West
- Music by: Ronald Stein
- Production company: Sunset Productions
- Distributed by: American Releasing Corporation
- Release date: June 15, 1956
- Running time: 73 minutes
- Country: United States
- Language: English
- Budget: $60,000

The Oklahoma Woman is a 1956 American Western film directed by Roger Corman.

== Plot ==
The film involves the return of Steve Ward, a former gunslinger recently released from federal prison, to his hometown to claim a ranch he has inherited. Upon his return, he finds that his hometown is divided along political lines with a group of powerful businessmen on one side and homeowners on the other. Much to his embarrassment, Steve finds that his former girlfriend, Marie "Oklahoma" Saunders, is aligned with the businessmen who are seeking even more power by placing their candidate in the senate. Aiding them is hired gunman Tom Blake.

The homeowners are led by Ed Grant whose daughter, Susan, becomes the object of Steve's attention. Meanwhile, Oklahoma, who still has strong feelings for Steve, rejects Tom's advances. Believing that Steve is keeping him from winning Oklahoma, Tom kills Ed Grant and with the help of Oklahoma, who is jealous of Steve's attention to Susan, frames Steve for the murder. The townspeople believe the story and agree that Steve should hang for the crime. Before Steve is hanged, Susan confronts Oklahoma, defeats her in a fight and forces her to sign a confession admitting that Tom is the killer.

Beaten and disgraced, Oklahoma leaves town as Tom is arrested by the sheriff for Ed Grant's murder. Susan and Steve, who have fallen in love, walk off together.

== Cast ==
- Richard Denning as Steve Ward
- Peggie Castle as Marie "Oklahoma" Saunders
- Cathy Downs as Susan Grant
- Mike Connors as Tom Blake
- Tudor Owen as Ed Grant
- Martin Kingsley as Sheriff Bill Peters
- Dick Miller as The Bartender
- Jonathan Haze
- Paul Blaisdell as a henchman

== Production ==
The film was originally known as The Girls of Hangtown.

It was the third of four Westerns Corman directed for ARC (who became AIP). The others were Five Guns West, Apache Woman and Gunslinger. Special effects technician Paul Blaisdell had a cameo role in the film as one of Peggy Castle's henchmen.

Apache Woman and The Oklahoma Woman came from ideas of AIP, the others were based on ideas of Corman.

The movie was made by Sunset Productions, one of independent production units that would make movies for ARC/AIP. Corman had his own unit, Paolo Alto, but worked for the other units as well. It was the first movie from Sunset; the second would be It Conquered the World, also directed by Corman.

The movie was made for $60,000 in SuperScope. Corman said he "tried to create a bigger look than the budget might indicate and save time and money in the process." He experimented shooting consecutively the components of multiple scenes that faced in one direction, then reversing the angle and shooting them all in the opposite direction. He said this made it easier for him to match backgrounds and wardrobe, "but it was too difficult for the actors and since then I've tended to shoot more in sequence."

It was the first of several collaborations between Corman and cinematographer Frederick E. West.

Among the films production challenges was addressing both Downs and Castle's insistence that they receive top billing. "Both ladies felt their names should be first" said producer Alex Gordon. "You'd think we were featuring Marlon Brando and Jack Nicholson."

== Release ==
The film was issued on a double bill with Female Jungle.

== Reception ==
Variety found the fight between the two female leads novel, but the movie itself was considered straight out of the oat bin. CEA Film Report was kinder, finding the movie full of action and praised the fight between Denning and Connors on the roof.

Monthly Film Bulletin said the movie was "below average... poorly photographed in SuperScope consisting of a series of loosely connected incidents which offer little scope for dramatic effect. A competent performance by Tudor Owen stands out amongst an undistinguished cast."

One reviewer called it "probably Corman's dullest film."

== Copyright ==
The copyright in and to this motion picture is currently held by Susan Nicholson Hofheinz (Susan Hart).
