= Dragstrip Girl (1957 film) =

1957 film

- Directed by: Edward L. Cahn
- Written by: Lou Rusoff
- Based on: story by Lou Rusoff
- Produced by: Alex Gordon executive Samuel Z. Arkoff
- Starring: John Ashley; Fay Spain; Frank Gorshin; Tommy Ivo
- Music by: Ronald Stein
- Production company: Golden State Productions
- Distributed by: American International Pictures (US); Anglo-Amalgamated (UK)
- Release date: April 24, 1957
- Running time: 69 minutes
- Country: United States
- Language: English
- Budget: $65,000 or $100,000

Dragstrip Girl is a 1957 film starring John Ashley in his first lead role. American International Pictures released the film as a double feature with Rock All Night and it proved an early success for the studio.

Fay Spain co-starred in the film, which was remade later that year as Motorcycle Gang. Special effects technician Paul Blaisdell had a cameo role in Dragstrip Girl.

== Plot ==
Louise Blake, a teenager, is crazy about hot-rod cars. When a couple of guys hide from the cops after an illegal street race, Louise meets them and brings them home to meet her parents. Fred Armstrong comes from a well-to-do family, impressing Louise's mother, whereas Jim Donaldson is poor but a resourceful mechanic, impressing Louise's dad.

Encouraged to speed by Louise, the car Jim's driving nearly hits a mother and child. Fred provokes a fight, then challenges Jim to a "chicken" drag race, with Fred's friend Rick Camden helping him and ending up with a broken leg. Fred and Rick then get into a hit-and-run accident, killing another motorist.

Things come to a head at a 100-lap race on an oval. Louise ends up behind the wheel of a car, with Fred trying to run her off the road because he's aware she intends to turn over evidence from the hit-and-run. She manages to save herself as Fred is taken away by the police.

== Cast ==
- Fay Spain as Louise Blake
- John Ashley as Fred Armstrong
- Steve Terrell as Jim Donaldson
- Frank Gorshin as Tommy Burns
- Tommy Ivo as Rick Camden
- Paul Blaisdell (cameo)

== Production ==
Steve Terrell had been in Runaway Daughters for Golden State (AIP's production company), who signed him to a 15-film contract, at three films a year for five years with the option for a fourth year. The script was by Lou Rusoff who was head of story for AIP.

Ashley had not meant to audition for the film. He accompanied his girlfriend to her audition and they asked if he wanted to try out as well; he was successful, although she was not. Ashley subsequently signed to a long-term contract with AIP. The film was shot in six days.

Filming started on 14 January 1957.

== Release ==
Samuel Z Arkoff of AIP said when the film was released in the Los Angeles area, forty percent of the theatres who showed it were drive ins.

== Reception ==
=== Critical ===
The Monthly Film Bulletin called it "a depressing and irresponsible film... glorifying the defiance of law and order, lax morals and the discardance of civilised behaviour."

The Los Angeles Times reported the "youngsters" in the film "are very poor representatives of today's youth."

Diabolique magazine said Ashley was "a terrific delinquent, full of scowls and swagger; he’d never had an acting lesson, but he has a natural presence and easily steals the movie from the "good guy", Steve Terrell (though in fairness, Ashley has the better part)."

== See also ==
- List of American films of 1957
