= Apache Woman (1955 film) =

1955 film by Roger Corman

- Theatrical release poster
- Directed by: Roger Corman
- Written by: Lou Rusoff
- Produced by: Roger Corman executive Alex Gordon
- Starring: Lloyd Bridges; Joan Taylor; Lance Fuller; Morgan Jones; Paul Birch; Lou Place; Dick Miller
- Music by: Ronald Stein
- Production company: Golden State
- Distributed by: American Releasing Corporation
- Release date: September 15, 1955
- Running time: 69 minutes
- Country: United States
- Language: English
- Budget: $80,000 or $150,000
- Box office: $200,000; 504,350 admissions (France)

Apache Woman is a 1955 American Western directed by Roger Corman and starring Lloyd Bridges. It was Corman's second film as director, following Five Guns West. It was one of four Westerns he made for American International Pictures, the other being Five Guns West, The Oklahoma Woman (1955) and Gunslinger (1956). Corman says Apache Woman and Oklahoma Woman were from ideas by AIP whereas the others were his ideas. This was the first film from Golden State Productions, a company headed by Alex Gordon.

== Plot ==
The Apaches are being rebellious and government agent Rex Moffett is called in to get to the bottom of who is behind it. Possible suspects include half-Apache Anne Libeau and her brother Armand Libeau.

== Cast ==
- Lloyd Bridges as Rex Moffett
- Joan Taylor as Anne LeBeau
- Lance Fuller as Armand LeBeau
- Morgan Jones as Macy
- Paul Birch as Sheriff
- Lou Place as Carrom, the undercover agent
- Paul Dubov as Ben Hunter
- Jonathan Haze as Tom Chandler
- Gene Marlowe as Chief White Star
- Dick Miller as Tall Tree
- Chester Conklin as Dick Mooney

== Production ==
The film was one of the first releases of the American Releasing Corporation which became AIP. They had previously distributed two films made by Roger Corman's company, Paolo Alto, The Fast and the Furious and Five Guns West, but Apache Woman was the first film from the production company, Golden State, which was set up by ARC, and run by Alex Gordon. (Golden State's second movie would be Day the World Ended, also directed by Corman.)

Golden State's first movie was to be King Robot. However exhibitors told Nicholson that robots were a poor commercial bet. Gordon says Sam Arkoff and Jim Nicholson, who ran ARC, decided a Western would be a safe commercial bet. The script was the first written by Lou Rusoff, Sam Arkoff's brother in law, who became AIP's most regular screenwriter.

Filming started May 1955. Tamra Cooper was cast in June 1955. Male star Lloyd Bridges was best known for Sea Hunt and Joan Taylor had been in a number of Howard Koch-Aubrey Schenck pictures.

Corman later said he found the experience interesting because it was one of the few films he directed where he had not developed the script himself. Nonetheless, he enjoyed the film, particularly working with Lloyd Bridges and Joan Taylor. It was shot in two weeks, mostly at the Iverson Ranch in the San Fernando Valley, where Corman had previously made Five Guns West. Alex Gordon later recalled:

After the fiasco with The Lawless Rider, I was ab-so-lute-ly just thrilled and amazed and grateful when I came on The Apache Woman set. Corman's set was quiet... everything was efficient... nobody was shouting...everybody seemed to know what they were doing... he had the right people there... and he was directing very quietly, giving his instructions and so on. Later I was told by Lloyd Bridges and a couple of others, especially Richard Denning, that Corman wasn't directing actors. Some of them were asking him certain questions about their interpretations, and Corman was hazy on that: "Just do it the way you would do it... whatever you think... " 'Very rarely did he ever correct an actor: "No, no, that isn't right..."

Lance Fuller later said Corman "spent all his time setting up shots. He directed the composition but neglected the actors. He spent a lot of time with the script girl setting things up. I kind of went my own way on that one. Roger was okay, and we had a good relationship, but I didn't get much direction from him. He didn't tell us what to do, so we improvised and directed ourselves." Fuller said "My highlight was a scene with Joan Taylor in the kitchen. I remember it was an outstanding scene. It was a dramatic monologue, and I directed it myself."

Dick Miller made his acting debut in the film. He had a double role - in the climax he plays an Indian and a member of the posse and wound up shooting at himself.

Lance Fuller later signed a ten-picture contract with ARC to make two movies a year.

== Reception ==
=== Box office ===
Although the movie came out in 1955, in September 1958 Samuel Z. Arkoff said he expected his company to break even on Apache Woman only at the end of the next year. Arkoff said this was because it was issued as a single feature and "a single feature usually gets played - and played down - as the second feature." Arkoff added this "taught us a lesson" and ARC/AIP decided after Apache Woman that, instead of selling films individually, to sell them two at a time as a "package" to play on a double bill. They had a great success doing this with their first double bill, Day the World Ended and The Phantom from 10,000 Leagues which secured the future of the company.

Alex Gordon confirmed that saying "it soon became obvious that single B-pictures like these first three [Fast and Furious, Five Guns West, Apache Woman] would not work out for the new company— they played the bottom of twin- bill programming at $25 per booking. AIP would have to own both pictures to obtain percentage bookings."

In 1969 Arkoff said Apache Woman took ten years to make a profit, and only after it was sold to television.

=== Critical ===
The Monthly Film Bulletin called it "competently made second-feature Western, unremarkable but of slightly above average calibre."

The movie has been called one of Corman's dullest films.

Another critic called it "competent, unremarkable... it needed some of that [regular Corman writer Charles B] Griffith flair."

== Copyright ==
Due to the death of her husband James Nicholson, who was in part responsible for many films produced by American International Pictures in the early 2000s, Susan Nicholson Hofheinz (Susan Hart) owns the copyright to this film and some others produced by AIP.

== See also ==
- List of American films of 1955
