= The Beast with a Million Eyes =

- Theatrical release poster by Albert Kallis
- Directed by: David Kramarsky; Lou Place; Donald Myers; Roger Corman (uncredited)
- Written by: Tom Filer
- Produced by: David Kramarsky; Charles Hanawalt
- Starring: Paul Birch; Lorna Thayer; Chester Conklin; Dick Sargent
- Cinematography: Everett Baker
- Edited by: Jack Killifer
- Music by: John Bickford
- Production company: San Mateo Productions
- Distributed by: American Releasing Corporation
- Release date: June 15, 1955 (United States)
- Running time: 78 minutes
- Country: United States
- Language: English
- Budget: $33,000 or $20,000
- Box office: $100,000

The Beast with a Million Eyes is a 1955 independently made American black-and-white science fiction film, produced and directed by David Kramarsky, that stars Paul Birch, Lorna Thayer, and Dona Cole. Some film sources have said that the film was co-directed by Lou Place. The film was co-produced by Roger Corman and Samuel Z. Arkoff. It was released on June 15, 1955 on a double feature with King Dinosaur, by American Releasing Corporation, which later became American International Pictures.

The film's storyline concerns a space alien that is able to see through the eyes of a large array of Earth life that it can also mentally control, part of its plan to conquer the Earth.

== Plot ==
Allan Kelley and his family struggle to survive on their small date ranch, located in the bleak California desert landscape well away from civilization. His wife Carol hates living so far from civilization, often taking her frustration out on their daughter Sandra. The only bright spot in Sandra's life is her boyfriend Larry Brewster.

After a mysterious object, initially thought to be a plane crashes nearby, both wild and domesticated animals begin attacking the family. Soon, the farm's handyman (Leonard Tarver) turns on the family, attacking them.

It is finally revealed that a space alien (the "beast" of the title) has taken total control of the area's lesser animals and is working its way up to humans, all part of its master plan to conquer the Earth.

In the end the family bond together, fighting against the alien menace. They must unite their minds in a show of love to have a chance of finally thwarting its plan of conquest.

Unable to counter this attack, the alien flees into the mind of a rat, where it is promptly killed and carried off by a hawk.

== Cast ==
- Paul Birch as Allan Kelley
- Lorna Thayer as Carol Kelley
- Dona Cole as Sandra Kelley
- Dick Sargent (credited as Richard Sargeant) as Deputy Larry Brewster
- Leonard Tarver as Him (aka Carl)
- Bruce Whitmore (voice only) as The Beast
- Chester Conklin as Ben "Old Man" Webber

== Production ==
Reportedly the film was based on a script called The Unseen by Tom Filer. Roger Corman was attracted to the project because in the original draft of the script, the monster was invisible, which meant the film could be done cheaply. Executive producer Sam Arkoff insisted on a visible monster and space ship, but there was very little in the budget to realize these effects. Corman's original idea was an alien that was an ethereal force incapable of being seen.

In April 1955, it was announced in Variety the film would be the first for Pacemaker Productions, a new company formed by Roger Corman. By that stage, the film had been retitled The Beast with a Million Eyes by Corman's distributor James Nicholson. To circumvent union rules, it would be produced and directed by David Kamarsky, Corman's former aide, while Corman would executive produce. Paul Birch's casting was announced in April 1955.

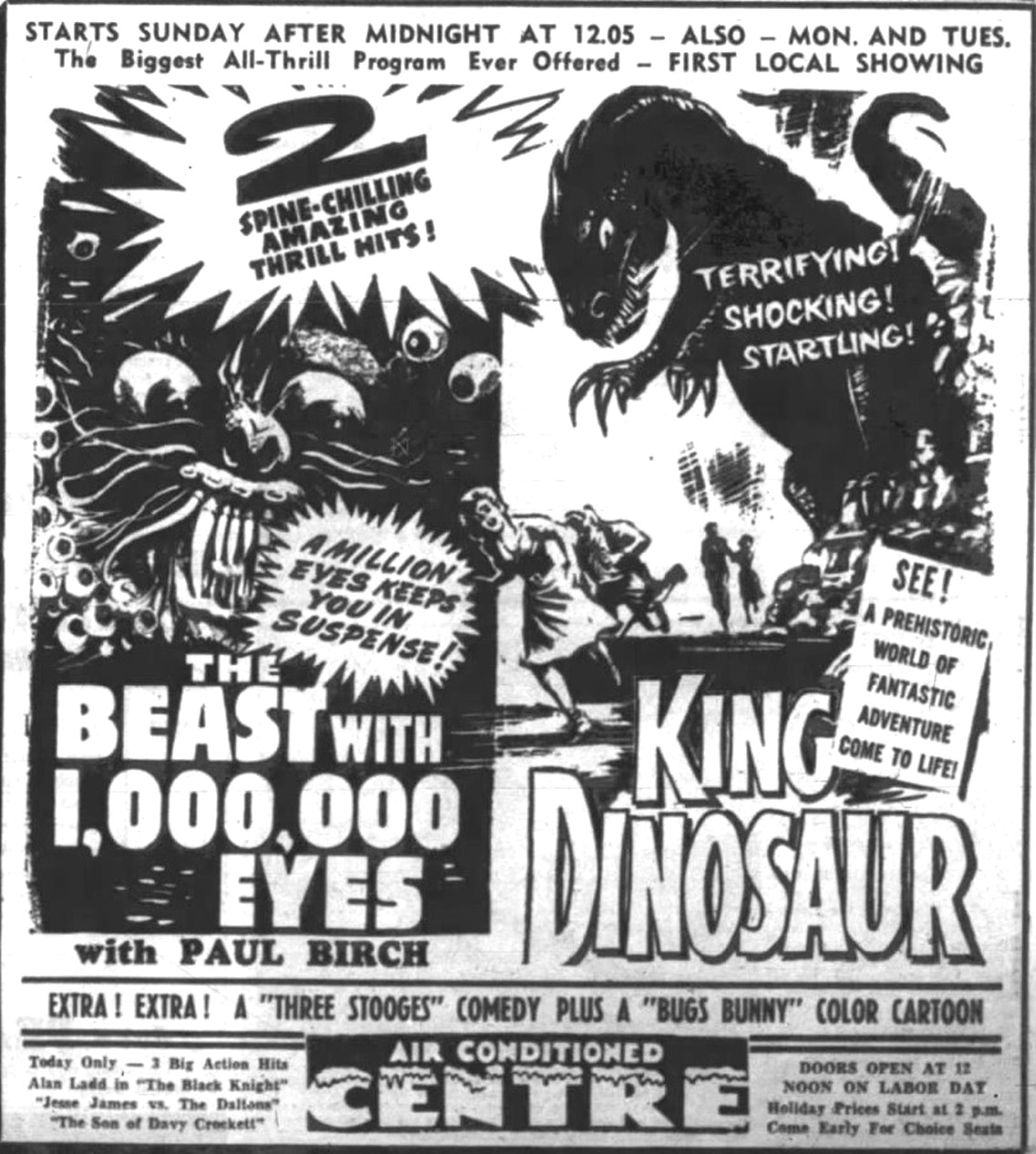
Advertisement from 1955 for The Beast with a Million Eyes and co-feature, King Dinosaur

This film was Dona Cole's only on-screen credit, having appeared uncredited in Daddy Long Legs (1955) and The Long Grey Line (1955).

The Beast with a Million Eyes was the third of a three-picture deal Roger Corman had with the American Releasing Company following The Fast and the Furious (1955) and Five Guns West (1955). Reportedly, cost over-runs on Five Guns West meant only about $29,000 remained to make the science fiction film for Pacemaker Productions.

The title, Beast with a Million Eyes, reportedly came from American Releasing Company president James H. Nicholson. His lurid title and poster had film exhibitors signed on before seeing the finished film. The "million eyes" of the title refers to the alien's ability to see through the eyes of the animals and people it controls by inhabiting their bodies.

Reportedly, The Beast with a Million Eyes was a non-union filming of a script originally titled The Unseen, with Lou Place set to direct. After one day's filming, the union threatened to shut down the production unless everyone signed with the Guild. With production running overtime, Roger Corman took over the film's directing chores and replaced the cinematographer with Floyd Crosby; but Corman took no official screen credit.

Filming took place in Indio and the Coachella Valley, California. Corman shot 48 pages of interiors in just two days at a studio on La Cienega Blvd. in Los Angeles.

The movie is also infamous for its exaggerated promotional poster. It features an eye-catching monster different from that seen in the movie.

=== Paul Blaisdell ===
When the company vice-president Samuel Z. Arkoff received The Beast with a Million Eyes he was unhappy that it did not even feature "the beast" that was implicit in the title. Paul Blaisdell, responsible for the film's special effects, was hired to create a three-foot-tall spaceship (with "beast" alien) for a meager $200. Notably, the art director was Albert S. Ruddy. Ruddy, who at the time was a student at USC, designed a monster for the film for $50.

It was Blaisdell's first monster made for the movies. He later said:

The creature seen in the last reel ... was actually the slave of The Beast, which had no physical being. It used a being from another star system to pilot its ship, but that fact doesn't come across very well in the script. The creature was an automaton and he was quite capable of doing a lot more than he was allowed to do in the film. He was about eighteen inches high — built to the same scale as King Kong. Unfortunately, all of his scenes were shot in about ten minutes, with the wrong camera angles and everything. But it's just one of those things which happens on a low-budget picture.

Blaisdell later donated the monster head to the movie prop collection of Forrest J. Ackerman, who negligently displayed the piece in a sun-drenched room of his house for many years (and in his refrigerator for a time) until it rotted away and fell apart.

According to Alex Gordon, when the film was first shown, Joseph E. Levine, then a distributor, offered Nicholson $100,000 to junk the movie and make a new one more in line with the advertising campaign. Gordon says James Nicholson spent two weeks analyzing the film and scratching over the negative to make it seem like lightning strikes to add to the dramatic qualities of the film.

=== Music ===
The tiny budget meant music in The Beast with a Million Eyes, credited to "John Bickford", is actually a collection of public-domain record library cues by classical composers Richard Wagner, Dimitri Shostakovich, Giuseppe Verdi, Sergei Prokofiev, Igor Stravinsky and others, used to defray the cost of an original score or copyrighted cues.

== Reception ==
Film historian Leonard Maltin called The Beast with a Million Eyes, "Imaginative though poorly executed sci-fi melodrama with desert setting; a group of people is forced to confront an alien that can control an unlimited number of animal hosts, hence the title." He further described the film as, "(an) early Roger Corman production (that) features Paul Blaisdell's first movie monster".

The Encyclopedia of Science Fiction found the movie to be minimal and the effects unconvincing, but noted this was one of, if not the first movie to feature animals attacking humans, predating The Birds.

TV Guide called the movie a turkey.

Moria gave the movie 2.5 stars, liking the idea and the setting, however the animal attacks are not viewed as scary and the direction was seen as pedestrian. It did however also note the similarities with Hitchcock's movie The Birds.

== Home media ==
In 2007 Metro-Goldwyn Mayer released The Beast with a Million Eyes as part of its Midnight Movies DVD catalog as a double-feature with The Phantom from 10,000 Leagues (1955).

In 2019, in conjunction with MGM, Scorpion Releasing released this on Blu-ray for Region A.

In July 2026, Eureka released a Region B Blu-ray set in the UK, titled Beasts Unleashed, containing this film and The Beast of Hollow Mountain (1956).

== See also ==
- List of American films of 1955
