= Rusoff =

Rusoff is a surname. Notable people with the surname include:

- Lou Rusoff (1911–1963), Canadian screenwriter and producer
- Ted Rusoff (1939–2013), Canadian voiceover artist
