= Paul Birch (actor) =

American actor (1912–1969)

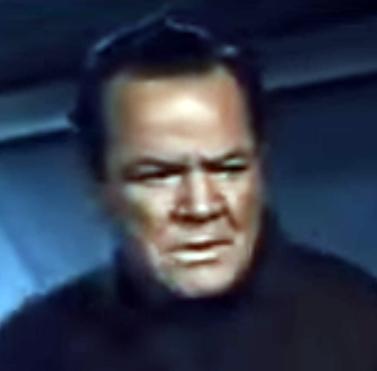
- Birch in 1958
- Born: Paul Lowery Smith; January 13, 1912; Atmore, Alabama, U.S.
- Died: May 24, 1969 (aged 57); St. George's, Grenada
- Occupation: Actor
- Years active: 1945–1969
- Spouse(s): Betsy Ann Ross (May 4, 1943 - May 24, 1969; his death), 3 children Margaret Evelyn Farish (June 11, 1932 - February 6, 1941; divorced), 1 child
- Children: 4
- Relatives: Ned Luke (grandson)

Paul Birch (born Paul Lowery Smith; January 13, 1912 – May 24, 1969) was an American actor. He appeared in 39 movies, 50 stage dramas, and numerous television series, including the Hallmark Hall of Fame (1951).

== Early life ==
Birch was born Paul Lowery Smith in Atmore, Alabama. He attended Alabama Polytechnic Institute.

== Career ==
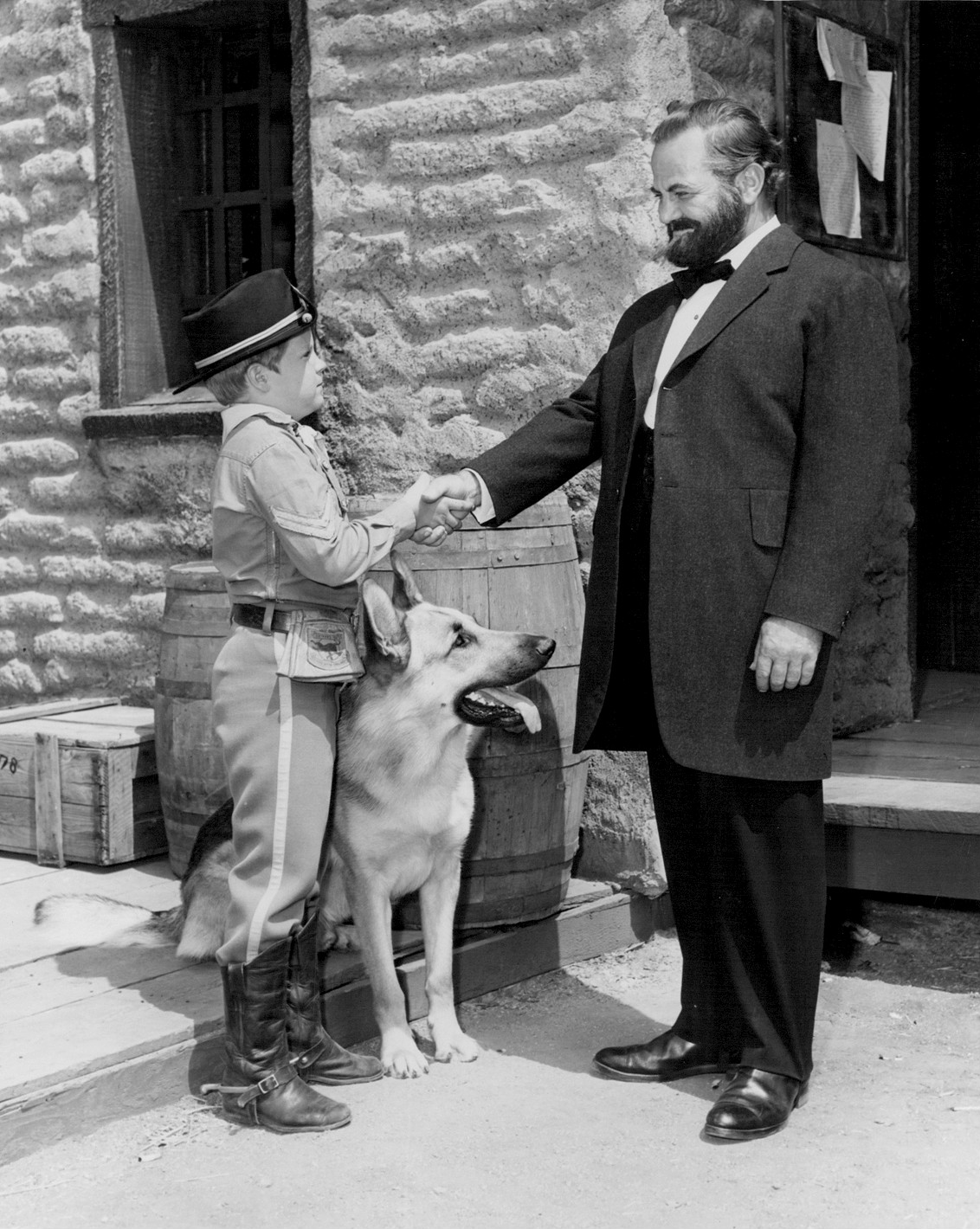
Birch as President Ulysses S. Grant with Lee Aaker as Rusty and Rin-Tin-Tin, 1956

=== Television ===
In the late 1950s, Birch starred with William Campbell in the syndicated Canadian series Cannonball (1958), a half-hour drama/adventure show about truck drivers. He was also a regular in The Court of Last Resort on NBC (1957-58).

Birch appeared in “Torn Flag”, a 1958 episode of the western series The Restless Gun. In the mid-1950s, he appeared as the first widely publicized "Cowboy" Marlboro Man in magazine and TV ads.

In 1959, he was cast as Sergeant Major Carmody, with Doug McClure as Corporal Jenkins, in the episode "The Face of Courage" of the NBC western series, Riverboat, starring Darren McGavin and Burt Reynolds. In the storyline, amid the threat of Sioux attack, Carmody commandeers the vessel, the Enterprise, while it is delivering military cargo to an Army outpost on the Missouri River. Joanna Moore appears in the episode as Kitty McGuire.

Birch also appeared as President Ulysses S. Grant in the 1960 episode "Mr. Simpson" of ABC's Black Saddle western series starring Peter Breck. He portrayed President Grant in two episodes of The Adventures of Rin-Tin-Tin. Birch also had a recurring role as Captain Carpenter, the boss of Lt. Phillip Gerard (Barry Morse) in the first two seasons of ABC's adventure/drama series The Fugitive. Paul Birch reprised his portrayal of U.S. Grant in "Wagon Train" S4 E9 "The Colter Craven Story" (1960). He appeared as Sgt. Bart Huntington in a 1961 episode of "Wagon Train", “Path of the Serpent”, and in 1959 he appeared in S3 E14 "The Lita Foladaire Story" as Mr. Clayton.

=== Stage ===
Birch appeared on Broadway in a production of The Caine Mutiny Court-Martial (1954-55). In several historical plays, he portrayed both Union Army General Ulysses S. Grant and Confederate General Robert E. Lee.

He was among the original members of the Pasadena Playhouse, the first actor to be one of that group's repertory players.

=== Film ===
Birch appeared as the police captain with the megaphone in Rebel Without A Cause (1955), and was one of the first to be "disintegrated" in the original movie The War of the Worlds (1953).

In the 1950s, he starred in some low-budget science-fiction films, including The Beast with a Million Eyes (1955), Day the World Ended (1955), Not of This Earth (1957), and the cult classic Queen of Outer Space (1958). Birch also had small roles in It's a Mad, Mad, Mad, Mad World (1963) and Dead Heat on a Merry-Go-Round (1967).

=== Teaching ===
While he acted at the Pasadena Playhouse, he was also "employed full-time as an instructor and director working with students in the Playhouse College of Theatre Arts."

== Personal life ==
Birch was married twice, first to Margaret Evelyn Farish, with he had a daughter named Cindy, whose son is actor Ned Luke (born 1958). He was survived by his second wife, the former Betsy Ann Ross Smith, and their three children, Don, Jennifer, and Michael.

== Death ==
Birch died of cancer at age 57 on May 24, 1969, at St. George's, the capital of the Caribbean island of Grenada. Survived by his widow and three children, he is buried in a cemetery outside the capital.

== Selected filmography ==
- The Royal Mounted Rides Again (1945) - Highwayman #2 (uncredited)
- The Daltons Ride Again (1945) - Wilkins Henchman (uncredited)
- Adventure (1945) - First Mate (uncredited)
- The Fighting Guardsman (1946) - Sergeant (uncredited)
- The Scarlet Horseman (1946) - Ace (uncredited)
- Till the End of Time (1946) - Marine Wanting Farm (uncredited)
- Check Your Guns (1948) - Member of The Plainsmen (uncredited)
- The Third Man (1949) - Military Policeman (uncredited)
- Bonzo Goes to College (1952) - Coach Duff (uncredited)
- Assignment – Paris! (1952) - Col. Mannix (uncredited)
- The War of the Worlds (1953) - Alonzo Hogue (uncredited)
- The System (1953) - Police Lt. Gordon (uncredited)
- The Eddie Cantor Story (1953) - (uncredited)
- Ride Clear of Diablo (1954) - Fred Kenyon
- Cattle Queen of Montana (1954) - Col. Carrington
- Man Without a Star (1955) - Mark Toliver
- Strange Lady in Town (1955) - Sheriff
- Five Guns West (1955) - J.C. Haggard
- The Beast with a Million Eyes (1955) - Allan Kelley
- Apache Woman (1955) - Sheriff
- Rebel Without a Cause (1955) - Police Chief (uncredited)
- Day the World Ended (1955) - Jim Maddison
- The Fighting Chance (1955) - Auctioneer
- When Gangland Strikes (1956) - Sheriff Mack McBride
- The Fastest Gun Alive (1956) - Yellowfork Sheriff Bill Toledo
- The White Squaw (1956) - Thad Arnold
- Everything But the Truth (1956) - Sen. Winter
- Gun for a Coward (1957) - Andy Niven
- Not of This Earth (1957) - Paul Johnson
- The Tattered Dress (1957) - Prosecutor Frank Mitchell
- The Spirit of St. Louis (1957) - Blythe (uncredited)
- Cheyenne (1957, TV series) - Col. Preston
- The 27th Day (1957) - Admiral
- Joe Dakota (1957) - Frank Weaver
- The World Was His Jury (1958) - Martin Ranker
- Gunman's Walk (1958) - Bob Selkirk
- The Restless Gun (1958) Episode "The Torn Flag"
- Wild Heritage (1958) - Jacob 'Jake' Breslin
- Queen of Outer Space (1958) - Prof. Konrad
- The Gun Runners (1958) - Sy Phillips
- Gunmen from Laredo (1959) - Marshal Matt Crawford
- Too Soon to Love (1960)
- Portrait in Black (1960) - Detective Lieutenant
- Pay or Die (1960) - Mayor
- The Dark at the Top of the Stairs (1960) - Jonah Mills
- Two Rode Together (1961) - Judge Edward Purcell
- Sea Hunt (7th Jan 1961), Season 4, Episode 1, Point of No Return
- A Public Affair (1962) - Malcomb Hardy
- The Man Who Shot Liberty Valance (1962) - Mayor Winder
- Gunsmoke (1962, TV series) - Jesse Ott
- It's a Mad, Mad, Mad, Mad World (1963) - Santa Rosita Police Department Officer at the intersection
- The Raiders (1963) - Paul King
- The Glory Guys (1965) - Commanding General
- Dead Heat on a Merry-Go-Round (1966) - Bill Simpson
- A Covenant with Death (1967) - Governor
- Welcome to Hard Times (1967) - Mr. Fee
- Counterpoint (1968, uncredited)
