= Diary of a High School Bride =

1959 film

- Directed by: Burt Topper
- Written by: Burt Topper; Robert Lowell; Jan Englund
- Produced by: Burt Topper
- Starring: Anita Sands
- Music by: Ronald Stein
- Distributed by: American International Pictures
- Release date: 1959
- Running time: 72 minutes
- Country: United States
- Language: English
- Budget: $80,000

Diary of a High School Bride is a 1959 film directed by Burt Topper about a 17-year-old high school student who gets married. American International Pictures released the film as a double feature with Ghost of Dragstrip Hollow.

== Plot ==
A 17-year-old high-school senior must justify her wedding to a 24-year-old law student to both her parents and her unbalanced ex-boyfriend.

== Production ==
The lead actress, Anita Sands, had never acted before. The film was shot over seven days.

Leftover sets for the film were used by Roger Corman to shoot A Bucket of Blood (1959).

== Reception ==
Contemporary reviews were poor.

== See also ==
- List of American films of 1959
