= High School Hellcats =

- Theatrical poster to High School Hellcats (1958)
- Directed by: Edward L. Bernds
- Written by: Mark Lowell; Jan Englund
- Produced by: Charles "Buddy" Rogers
- Starring: Yvonne Lime; Bret Halsey; Jana Lund
- Cinematography: Gilbert Warrenton
- Music by: Ronald Stein
- Distributed by: American International Pictures
- Release date: June 1958
- Running time: 69 minutes
- Country: United States
- Language: English

High School Hellcats is a 1958 American exploitation film starring Yvonne Lime, Bret Halsey, and Jana Lund and directed by Edward L. Bernds. It is part of a series of exploitation films about juvenile delinquents produced during the 1950s by American International Pictures. American International Pictures released the film as a double feature with Hot Rod Gang. The film is also known as School For Violence.

== Plot summary ==
Joyce Martin is a transfer student at her new school. On her first day, she is sized up by the leader of the Hellcats, Connie. For her first test of initiation, Joyce is tricked into wearing slacks to school even though it is verboten by school policy. During class the teacher asks Joyce to be the blackboard volunteer, Joyce reluctantly gets up, and Miss Davis asks her why she is wearing slacks. Humiliated, she cuts class and goes to a nearby coffee shop and meets the coffee shop employee Mike, a college student who takes night classes, as he must financially support himself.

Joyce goes to a Hellcats meeting at an abandoned theater where she is officially introduced to the members of the Hellcats. Connie explains to her the premise of the group: the Hellcats are a girl gang who rule the social order of the school. If she is invited to join, she will be popular; if she fails, her life will be very rough. Joyce has passed the first test but must undergo two more before initiation. Good grades are not allowed and she may only date Hellcat-approved boys. Joyce agrees but she secretly begins dating Mike.

The girls meet to go shoplifting the next day. When they stop at the coffee shop afterward, Joyce is rude to Mike. Connie and Dolly tell her she should stay away from him.

The next initiation test requires Joyce to go up to Riff, who is with his girlfriend, and ask him to be her date at a dance. To the furor of his girlfriend, he agrees.

At the party, they decide to play a game of Sardines. In the dark, a scream is heard. When the lights come on, they find Connie's body on the downstairs landing. She is dead. They agree to get out quickly and not say anything. A couple of boys drop Joyce off near her house. Mike drives by and she jumps into his car. The boys come over and try to beat Mike up but he is able to fend them off. Joyce and Mike go to his apartment. Joyce cries on his shoulder, says it was a terrible party, and eventually falls asleep in his arms. Joyce's father is furious when she finally arrives home. Her mother defends her. Joyce says she will not follow her father's rules.

Connie is reported missing and the police start questioning students at the high school. Dolly, now running the Hellcats, reminds them to say nothing.

Joyce visits sympathetic teacher Miss Davis, but does not tell her anything. Dolly leaves a note on Joyce's desk summoning her to a meeting that night. Mike gives her a ride to the abandoned theater. She tells him she will only be 10 minutes, just time enough to quit the Hellcats, and he waits outside for her.

Two of the Hellcats find the note and go to Miss Davis. They know that there is no meeting and they are worried that Dolly intends to teach Joyce a lesson. Miss Davis calls the police. On the balcony of the theater Dolly confronts Joyce, telling her that she pushed Connie out of jealousy because she was getting too friendly with Joyce. Dolly lunges toward Joyce with a knife but Joyce moves at the last moment and Dolly falls over the balcony to the floor below, dead. The police arrive. Mike rushes in. Miss Davis arrives. Mike takes Joyce home. Miss Davis calls Joyce's parents to tell them what happened. She tells them that Mike is a good guy. Joyce's parents are waiting on the doorstep. They hug Joyce. Joyce's father pats Mike on the shoulder and they enter the house together.

== Cast ==
- Yvonne Lime Fedderson as Joyce Martin
- Brett Halsey as Mike Landers (as Bret Halsey)
- Jana Lund as Connie Harris, aka Connie Ross
- Susanne Sidney as Dolly Crane (as Suzanne Sydney)
- Heather Ames as Meg
- Nancy Kilgas as Laurie
- Rhoda Williams as Trudy Davis, teacher
- Don Shelton as Roger Martin
- Viola Harris as Linda Martin
- Robert Anderson as Police Lt. Manners
- Martin Braddock as Rip
- Arthur Marshall as Mr. Anderson

== Production ==
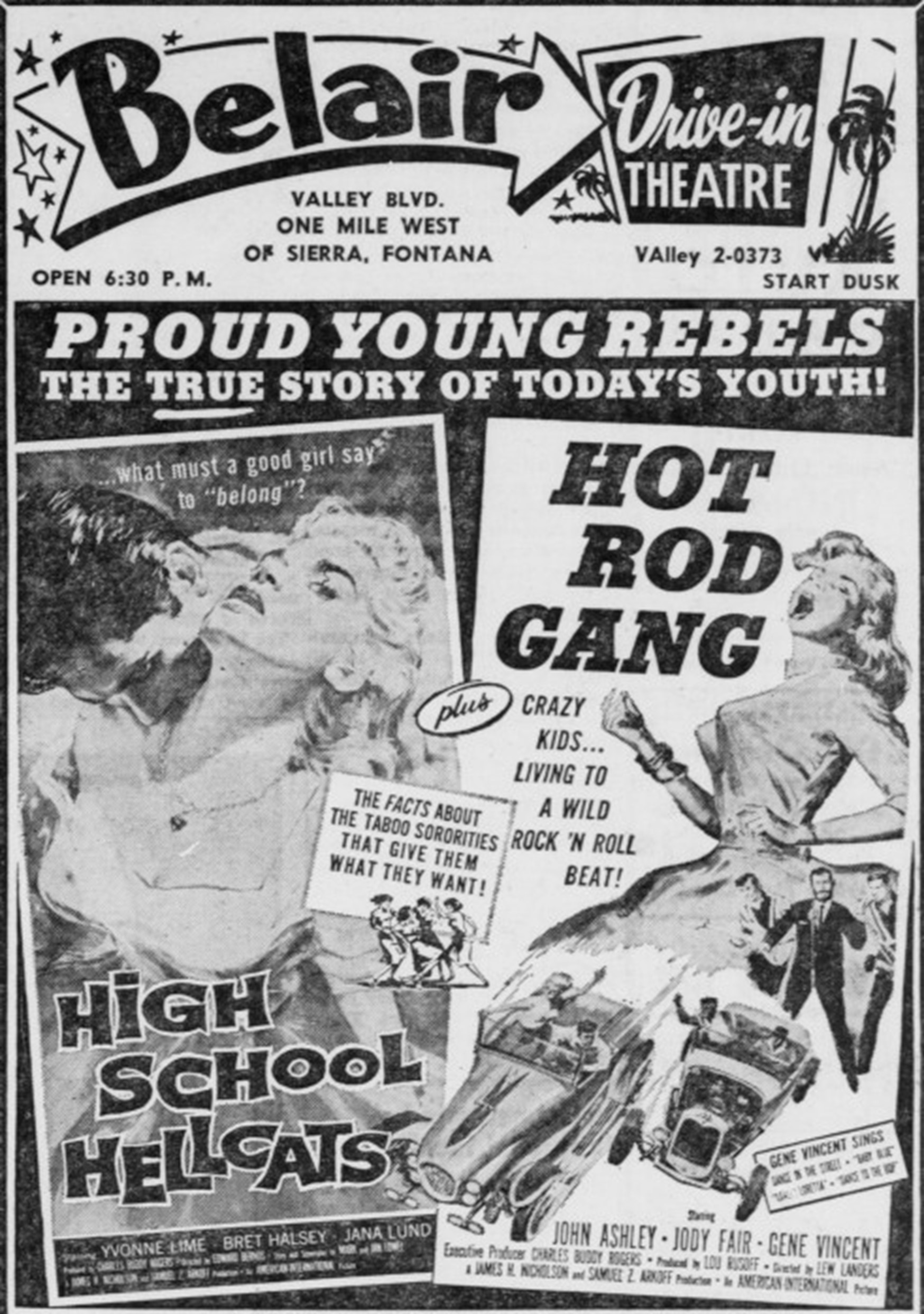
Drive-in advertisement from 1958 featuring High School Hellcats with companion feature, Hot Rod Gang.

This movie was part of a two-picture deal (the other movie being Hot Rod Gang) between producers Charles "Buddy" Rogers, who was the husband of "America's Sweetheart" Mary Pickford, and Ferde Grofe Jr., son of the composer Ferde Grofe, in association with a nationwide competition in Dig Magazine. Mary Pickford put up $100,000 for each of the movies. Grofe Jr. had his name removed from the credits, fearing the low-brow nature of this and Hot Rod Gang would reflect poorly on his father.

== Location ==
The film was shot on Comstock Avenue in Holmby Hills, with Holmby Park in the background.

== Reception ==
In October 1958, at an American International Pictures luncheon for the Theaters Owners Association of America, producer Jerry Wald said that the pictures like High School Hellcats are "not the type of picture on which we can build the market of the future. While they may make a few dollars today, they will destroy us tomorrow." Producer James H. Nicholson responded by stating "I'd rather take my children to see these pictures than God's Little Acre"

The film was condemned by PTA groups in Los Angeles

Director Edward Bernds stated that he "never made a dime" on High School Hellcats until it sold to TV.
