= Submarine Seahawk =

1958 film by Spencer Gordon Bennet

- Directed by: Spencer Gordon Bennet
- Screenplay by: Lou Rusoff
- Produced by: Alex Gordon; Orville H. Hampton
- Starring: John Bentley; Brett Halsey; Wayne Heffley
- Cinematography: Gilbert Warrenton
- Edited by: Homer Powell; Ronald Sinclair
- Music by: Alexander Laszlo
- Production company: Golden State Productions
- Distributed by: American International Pictures
- Release date: December 1958
- Running time: 83 minutes
- Country: United States
- Language: English

Submarine Seahawk is a 1958 World War II film directed by Spencer Gordon Bennet and starring John Bentley and Brett Halsey. The film was originally released as a double feature with Paratroop Command. The plot tells the story of a by-the-book officer (in his first command in the Pacific war) who is ordered to take his submarine on a reconnaissance mission to locate a fleet of Japanese fighting ships the Allies have lost track of. At first, the rest of the crew resent his distant manner and the way he keeps avoiding taking on the Japanese.

== Plot ==
The plot tells the story of a by-the-book officer (in his first command in the Pacific war) who replaces a captain the crew likes but against his wishes is needed on shore. The new captain is ordered to take his submarine on a reconnaissance mission to locate a fleet of Japanese fighting ships the Allies have lost track of. At first the rest of the crew resent his distant manner and the way he keeps avoiding taking on the Japanese. In time they learn why and the captain begins to understand how to get along with his officers and crew. The fleet is found and the captain calls in bombers on his own position. Some of the crew are trapped in a flooding compartment and accept that they will be abandoned if it is needed to save the boat. Eventually they are rescued and the submarine escapes, sinking an aircraft carrier on the way back to Pearl Harbor.

== Cast ==
- John Bentley as Lt. Cmdr. Paul Turner
- Brett Halsey as Lt. (j.g.) David Shore
- Wayne Heffley as Cmdr. Dean Stoker
- Steve Mitchell as CPO Andy Flowers
- Henry McCann as Seaman Ellis Bellis
- Paul Maxwell as Lt. Bill Hallohan, XO
- Nicky Blair as Sam
- Frank Gerstle as Capt. Boardman
- Jan Brooks as Mrs. Ellen Turner
- Mabel Rea as Maisie
- Leon Tyler as Ed
- Hal Bogart as Radio Operator
- Frank Watkins as Bearded Sonar Man
- Don Fenwick as Radio Operator
- Marilyn Hanold as Nancy

== Production ==
Submarine Seahawk was the last film produced by Alex Gordon for AIP. Gordon was unhappy that he was never given money owed for his films - a complaint echoed by others who worked for AIP including Jack Rabin, Edward Bernds, Herman Cohen, Sid Pink and Bert I. Gordon. Gordon also recalled his permission to use footage from the 1943 Warner Bros. films Destination Tokyo and Air Force through his brother Richard Gordon.
