= American International Pictures =

American film production company

American International Pictures, LLC
- Logo used since 2020
- Formerly: American Releasing Corporation (1954–1956)
- Type: Label
- Industry: Motion Pictures
- Founded: April 2, 1954; 72 years ago (original); October 7, 2020; 6 years ago (relaunch; under the American International Pictures label)
- Founders: James H. Nicholson; Samuel Z. Arkoff
- Defunct: August 4, 1980; 46 years ago (original)
- Fate: Merged into Filmways (original)
- Successor: Filmways Pictures (original)
- Headquarters: Culver City, California, U.S.
- Area served: Worldwide
- Products: Motion pictures
- Parent: Filmways (1979–1980); Metro-Goldwyn-Mayer (2020–2023); Amazon MGM Studios (2023–present)

American International Pictures, LLC (AIP or American International Productions) is an American film production company owned by Amazon MGM Studios. In its original operating period, AIP was an independent film production and distribution company known for producing and releasing films from 1955 until 1980, a year after its acquisition by Filmways in 1979.

It was formed on April 2, 1954, as American Releasing Corporation (ARC) by former Realart Pictures Inc. sales manager James H. Nicholson and entertainment lawyer Samuel Z. Arkoff and their first release was the 1953 UK documentary film Operation Malaya. It was dedicated to releasing low-budget films packaged as double features, primarily of interest to the teenagers of the 1950s, 1960s, and 1970s.

The company eventually became a part of Orion Pictures, which in turn, became a division of Amazon MGM Studios. On October 7, 2020, four decades after the original closure, Metro-Goldwyn-Mayer revived AIP as a label for acquired films for digital and theatrical releases, with MGM overseeing across streaming platforms and United Artists Releasing handling theatrical distribution in North America until 2023 when Amazon MGM Studios took over.

== AIP personnel ==
Nicholson and Arkoff served as executive producers while Roger Corman and Alex Gordon were the principal film producers and, sometimes, directors. Writer Charles B. Griffith wrote many of the early films, along with Arkoff's brother-in-law, Lou Rusoff, who later produced many of the films he had written. Other writers included Ray Russell, Richard Matheson and Charles Beaumont. Floyd Crosby, A.S.C. famous for his camera work on a number of exotic documentaries and the Oscar winner, High Noon, was chief cinematographer. His innovative use of surreal color and odd lenses and angles gave AIP films a signature look. The early rubber monster suits and miniatures of Paul Blaisdell were used in AIP's science fiction films. The company also hired Les Baxter and Ronald Stein to compose many of its film scores.

In the 1950s, the company had a number of actors under contract, including John Ashley, Fay Spain and Steve Terrell.

== Filmaking style ==
=== Target audience ===
I realized that movie-going was becoming a habit of young people. Older people stayed home and watched TV. But the tribal habits of our culture dictated that young people go out on dates, so they would always go to the movies. And so we began making movies for them.

— Samuel Z. Arkoff

When many of ARC/AIP's first releases failed to earn a profit, Arkoff quizzed film exhibitors who told him of the value of the teenage market as adults were watching television. AIP stopped making Westerns with Arkoff explaining: "To compete with television westerns you have to have color, big stars and $2,000,000".

AIP was the first company to use focus groups, polling American teenagers about what they would like to see and using their responses to determine titles, stars, and story content. AIP would question their exhibitors (who often provided 20% of AIP's financing) what they thought of the success of a title, then would have a writer create a script for it. A sequence of tasks in a typical production involved creating a great title, getting an artist such as Albert Kallis who supervised all AIP artwork from 1955 to 1973 to create a dynamic, eye-catching poster, then raising the cash, and finally writing and casting the film.

According to FilmInk, "AIP ran on basic principles: keep overheads down (i.e. no permanent studio space), keep all costs down, use fading stars (e.g. Ray Milland) or its own up-and-coming names (e.g. John Ashley), use cheap directors, go for genre (horror, sci fi, action, peplum), follow the trends, abandon the trends when audience enthusiasm lessens, give audiences something they can’t get from a regular studio picture, build your own franchises."

=== The ARKOFF formula ===
Samuel Z. Arkoff related his "ARKOFF formula" for producing a successful low-budget movie years later, during a 1980s talk show appearance. His ideas for a movie included:

- Action (exciting, entertaining drama)
- Revolution (novel or controversial themes and ideas)
- Killing (a modicum of violence)
- Oratory (notable dialogue and speeches)
- Fantasy (acted-out fantasies common to the audience)
- Fornication (sex appeal for young adults)

Later, the AIP publicity department devised a strategy called "the Peter Pan Syndrome":

a) a younger child will watch anything an older child will watch;
b) an older child will not watch anything a younger child will watch;
c) a girl will watch anything a boy will watch;
d) a boy will not watch anything a girl will watch;
therefore:
to catch your greatest audience you zero in on the 19-year-old male.

== History ==
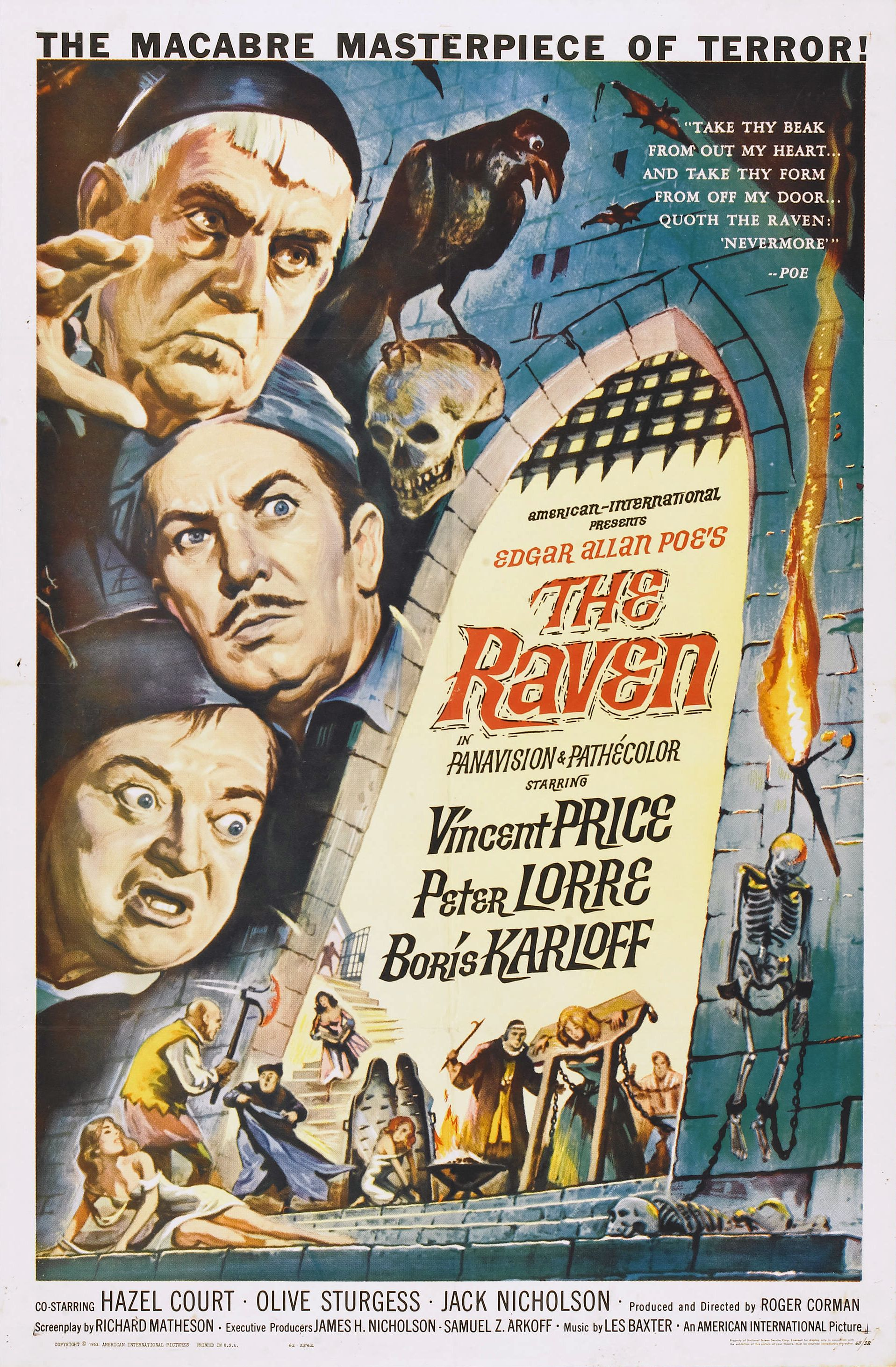
Roger Corman's The Raven (1963)

=== American Releasing Corporation ===
AIP began as the American Releasing Corporation, a new distribution company formed in 1954 by James H. Nicholson and Samuel Z. Arkoff.

==== Roger Corman ====
They were interested in distributing a car chase movie produced by Roger Corman for his Palo Alto Productions, The Fast and the Furious (1955). Corman had received offers from other companies for the film, but ARC offered to advance money to enable Corman to make two other films. Corman agreed, The Fast and the Furious performed well at the box office and the company was launched.

Corman's next two films for the company were a Western, Five Guns West (1955), which Corman directed, and a science fiction film, The Beast with a Million Eyes (1955). The title from the latter had come from Nicholson.

ARC also distributed the Western Outlaw Treasure (1955) starring Johnny Carpenter.

==== Alex Gordon ====
ARC got Corman to direct another Western and science fiction double bill Apache Woman (1955) and Day the World Ended (1955). Both scripts were written by Arkoff's brother-in-law Lou Rusoff, who would become the company's leading writer in its early days. Apache Woman was produced by Alex Gordon, an associate of Arkoff's, Day was produced by Corman. Both were made by Golden State Productions, ARC's production arm.

Normally, B movies were made for the second part of a bill and received a flat rate. As television was encroaching on the B movie market, Nicholson and Arkoff felt it would be more profitable to make two low budget films and distribute them together on a double feature. Nicholson came up with a title for a film to support Day the World Ended, The Phantom from 10,000 Leagues (1955), but lacked the money to make both films. They split the costs with Dan and Jack Milner, film editors who wanted to get into production. The resulting double bill was very successful at the box office.

Gordon also produced The Oklahoma Woman (1955), a Western by Corman, made through Sunset Productions. It was put on a double feature with Female Jungle (1955), a film noir.

Other films released under the ARC banner include a British documentary Operation Malaya (1955) and Corman's Gunslinger (1956).

=== American International in the 1950s ===
Arkoff and Nicholson had always wanted to name their company "American International Pictures", but the name was unavailable. When the name became available, they changed over.

There were three main production arms at AIP in the late 1950s: Roger Corman, Alex Gordon & Lou Rusoff, and Herman Cohen. Arkoff and Nicholson would buy films from other filmmakers as well, and import films from outside America.

==== Roger Corman ====
Corman continued to be an important member of AIP (though he also worked for Allied Artists and his own Filmgroup company during this period). He had a big hit for the company with the science fiction film It Conquered the World (1956) from a script by Rusoff that was rewritten by Charles B. Griffith.

His films included Rock All Night (1956); Naked Paradise (1957), in which Arkoff had a small role; The Undead; Sorority Girl; The Saga of the Viking Women and Their Voyage to the Waters of the Great Sea Serpent (1957); Machine Gun Kelly with Charles Bronson; and Teenage Caveman (1958), with Robert Vaughn.

AIP also distributed films Corman helped finance, such as Night of the Blood Beast, She Gods of Shark Reef and The Brain Eaters (all released in 1958).

==== Alex Gordon and Lou Rusoff ====
The other key producer for AIP was Alex Gordon who mostly made films though his Golden State Productions outfit, usually written by Lou Rusoff. He made Girls in Prison (1956), with director Edward L. Cahn who would become one of AIP's most prolific directors. AIP released it on a double bill with Hot Rod Girl (1956).

Cahn also directed the following for Gordon: The She-Creature (released as a double feature with It Conquered the World); Flesh and the Spur, the last Western made by AIP; Shake, Rattle & Rock!, a rock musical with Mike Connors; Runaway Daughters (1956); Voodoo Woman; Dragstrip Girl (1957), with John Ashley; Motorcycle Gang (1957), again with Ashley; Jet Attack and Submarine Seahawk (1958). Most of these were written by Rusoff and directed by Edward L. Cahn.

Gordon left AIP and Rusoff alone produced Hot Rod Gang (1958) and Ghost of Dragstrip Hollow (1959).

==== Herman Cohen ====
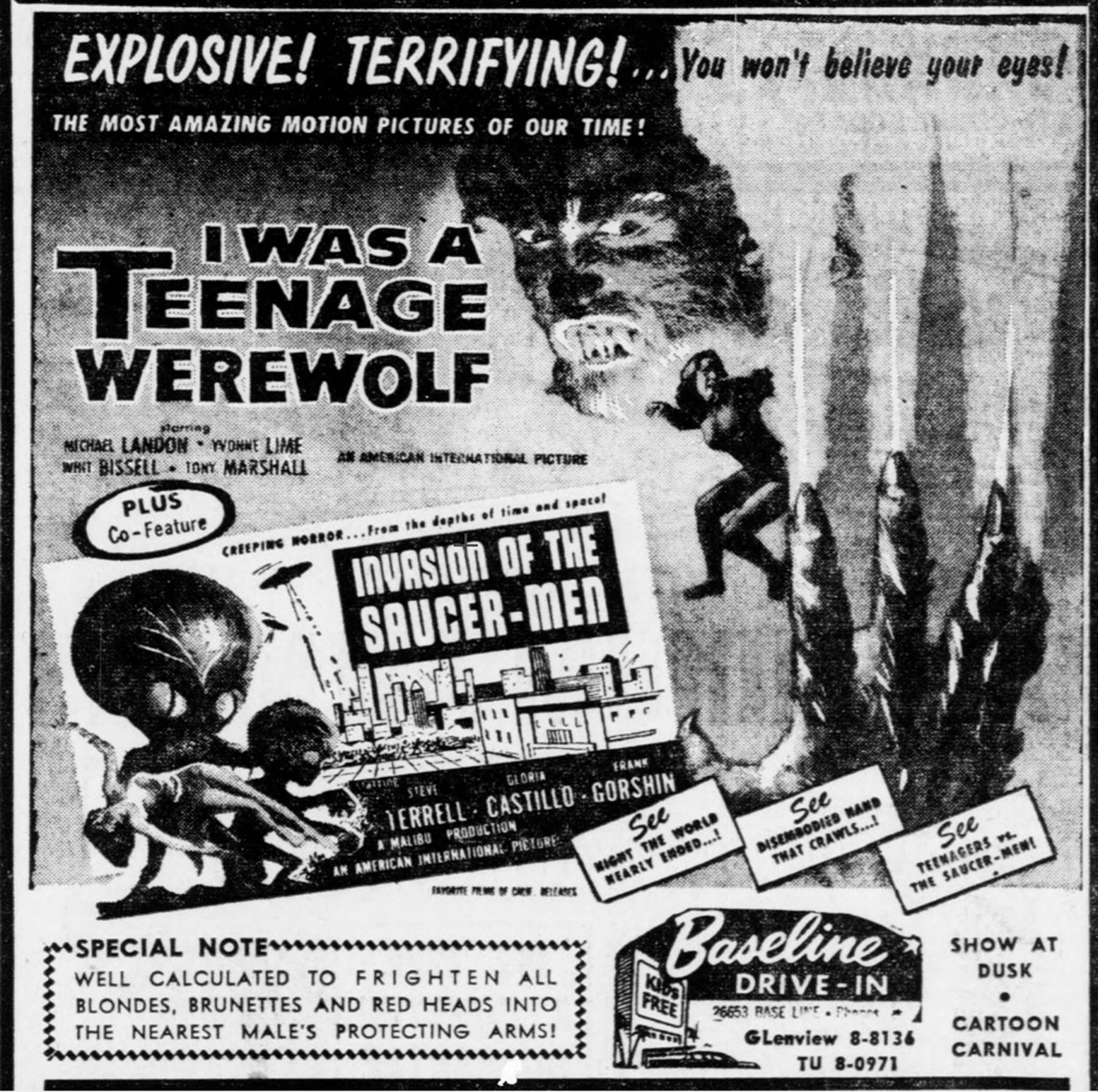
Drive-in advertisement for the double feature, I Was a Teenage Werewolf and Invasion of the Saucer Men. AIP double features were popular on the drive-in circuit.

Another key producer for AIP was Herman Cohen, who had a huge hit with I Was a Teenage Werewolf (1957) starring Michael Landon. He followed it with I Was a Teenage Frankenstein, Blood of Dracula (both also in 1957 as a double feature), How to Make a Monster (1958), The Headless Ghost and Horrors of the Black Museum (both in 1959).

==== Other producers ====
Other key collaborators who worked for AIP in the late 1950s included:

- Norman T. Herman: Hot Rod Girl (1956)
- Robert Gurney: Invasion of the Saucer Men (1957; released as a double feature with I Was a Teenage Werewolf), Reform School Girl (1957) and Terror from the Year 5000 (1958)
- Bert I. Gordon: The Amazing Colossal Man (1957), Attack of the Puppet People (1958), War of the Colossal Beast (1958; the sequel to The Amazing Colossal Man) and Earth vs. the Spider (1958)
- Burt Topper: Hell Squad (1958), Tank Commandos (1959) and Diary of a High School Bride (1959)
- Edward Bernds: High School Hellcats (1958).
- Stanley Shpetne: The Bonnie Parker Story (1958) and Paratroop Command (1959).
- Stanley Kallis: Operation Dames (1959) and Roadracers (1959).

==== Pickups ====
AIP would flesh out their distribution schedule by buying films made by outside producers. These included The Astounding She-Monster, the documentary Naked Africa, The Screaming Skull (1957), The Cool and the Crazy, Daddy-O, Dragstrip Riot and Tank Battalion (1958).

==== Anglo-Amalgamated ====
AIP developed a mutual relationship with Britain's Anglo-Amalgamated who would distribute AIP's product in the UK. In return, AIP would distribute their films in the U.S., such as The Tommy Steele Story (1957) and Cat Girl (1957).

AIP also imported The White Huntress (1954, England), Pulgarcito (1958, Mexico) and The Sky Calls (1959, Russia).

==== Late 1950s crisis ====
AIP became a victim of its own success when other companies started copying its double feature strategy. Costs were rising and were not compensated by increased box office grosses. AIP shut down most of their production arms and focused on distributing films from Italy, while they decided what to do next.

In October 1959 AIP announced it had secured finance from Colonial Bank (which had financed three of their films to date) for ten films over the next 12 months. The remaining 14 to 20 projects planned were paid by Pathe Laboratories. The ten films were Diary of a High School Bride, Drag Race, The Haunted House of Usher, End of the World, World Without Women, Bombs Away, Blood Hill,Take Me To Your Leader, She and Eve and the Dragon. Not all of these would be made.

=== AIP's 1960s output ===
The company moved into rented office space at the former Chaplin Studios.

==== Imports ====
In the late 1950s, AIP kept their company afloat by importing films from Italy. These included Sheba and the Gladiator (1959), Goliath and the Barbarians (1959) and Black Sunday (1960); the latter film proved to be one of the company's early successes.

There was also Atomic Agent (1959, France), The Angry Red Planet (1959, Denmark), Tiger of Bengal (1959) and The Indian Tomb (1960) from Fritz Lang in Germany, edited together as Journey to the Lost City, Portrait of a Sinner (1959, West Germany), The Professionals (1960, Great Britain), and Escape to Paradise (1960, the Philippines).

They also bought Why Must I Die? and The Jailbreakers (1960).

==== The Corman-Poe cycle ====
In the early 1960s, AIP gained kudos by combining Roger Corman, Vincent Price and the stories of Edgar Allan Poe into a series of horror films, with scripts by Richard Matheson, Charles Beaumont, Ray Russell, R. Wright Campbell and Robert Towne.

The original idea, usually credited to Corman and Lou Rusoff, was to take Poe's story "The Fall of the House of Usher", which had both a high name-recognition value and the merit of being in the public domain, and thus royalty-free, and expand it into a feature film. Corman convinced the studio to give him a larger budget than the typical AIP film so he could film the movie in widescreen and color, and use it to create lavish sets as well.

The success of House of Usher led AIP to finance further films based on Poe's stories. The sets and special effects were often reused in subsequent movies (for example, the burning roof of the Usher mansion reappears in most of the other films as stock footage), making the series quite cost-effective. All the films in the series were directed by Roger Corman, and they all starred Price except The Premature Burial, which featured Ray Milland in the lead. It was originally produced for another studio, but AIP acquired the rights to it.

As the series progressed, Corman made attempts to change the formula. Later films added more humor to the stories, especially The Raven, which takes Poe's poem as an inspiration and develops it into an all-out farce starring Price, Boris Karloff and Peter Lorre; Karloff had starred in a 1935 film with the same title. Corman also adapted H. P. Lovecraft's short novel The Case of Charles Dexter Ward in an attempt to get away from Poe, but AIP changed the title to that of an obscure Poe poem, The Haunted Palace, and marketed it as yet another movie in the series. The last two films in the series, The Masque of the Red Death and The Tomb of Ligeia, were filmed in England with an unusually long schedule for Corman and AIP.

Although Corman and Rusoff are generally credited with coming up with the idea for the Poe series, in an interview on the Anchor Bay DVD of Mario Bava's Black Sabbath, Mark Damon claims that he first suggested the idea to Corman. Damon also says that Corman let him direct The Pit and the Pendulum uncredited. Corman's commentary for Pit mentions nothing of this and all existing production stills of the film show Corman directing.

==== List of Corman-Poe films ====
During the early 1960s, AIP produced a series of horror films inspired by the Poe cycle. Of eight films, seven feature stories that are actually based on the works of Poe.

1. House of Usher (1960) – based on the short story "The Fall of the House of Usher"
2. The Pit and the Pendulum (1961) – based on the title of the short story of the same name
3. The Premature Burial (1962) – based on the short story of the same name
4. Tales of Terror (1962) – based on the short stories "Morella", "The Black Cat", "The Cask of Amontillado" and "The Facts in the Case of M. Valdemar"
5. The Raven (1963) – based on the poem of the same name
6. The Haunted Palace (1963) – plot based on H. P. Lovecraft's novel The Case of Charles Dexter Ward, using the title from Poe's 1839 poem
7. The Masque of the Red Death (1964) – based on the short story of the same name with another Poe short story, "Hop-Frog", used as a subplot
8. The Tomb of Ligeia (1964) – based on the short story "Ligeia"

Seven of the films, with the exception of The Premature Burial, featured Vincent Price as the star. Occasionally, Corman's 1963 film The Terror (produced immediately after The Raven) is recognized as being part of the Corman-Poe cycle, although the film's story and title are not based on any literary work of Poe.

Some Poe films announced by AIP but not made include The Gold Bug, The Thousand and Second Tale of Scheherazade, and The Angel of the Odd.

In 1962, Arkoff said AIP was in a position similar to Columbia Pictures just before they made Submarine and Dirigible:

Before that they were on poverty row. Our better position will enable us to obtain more important writers, perhaps more important producers as well. We're a privately owned company at the moment but perhaps within two or three years we will become a public company.

==== Beach Party era ====
Beginning with 1963's Beach Party, AIP created a new genre of beach party films featuring Annette Funicello and Frankie Avalon. The original idea and the first script were Rusoff's. The highly successful and often imitated series ended in 1966 with the seventh film, The Ghost in the Invisible Bikini. Many actors from the beach films also appeared in AIP's spy-spoofs, such as Dr. Goldfoot and the Bikini Machine (1965) and car racing films such as Fireball 500 (1966) and Thunder Alley. During this time, AIP also produced or distributed most of Corman's horror films, such as X: The Man with the X-ray Eyes.

In 1966, the studio released The Wild Angels starring Peter Fonda, based loosely on the real-life exploits of the Hells Angels motorcycle gang. This film ushered in AIP's most successful year and kicked off a subgenre of motorcycle gang films that lasted almost 10 years and included Devil's Angels, The Glory Stompers with Dennis Hopper, and The Born Losers—the film that introduced the Billy Jack character.

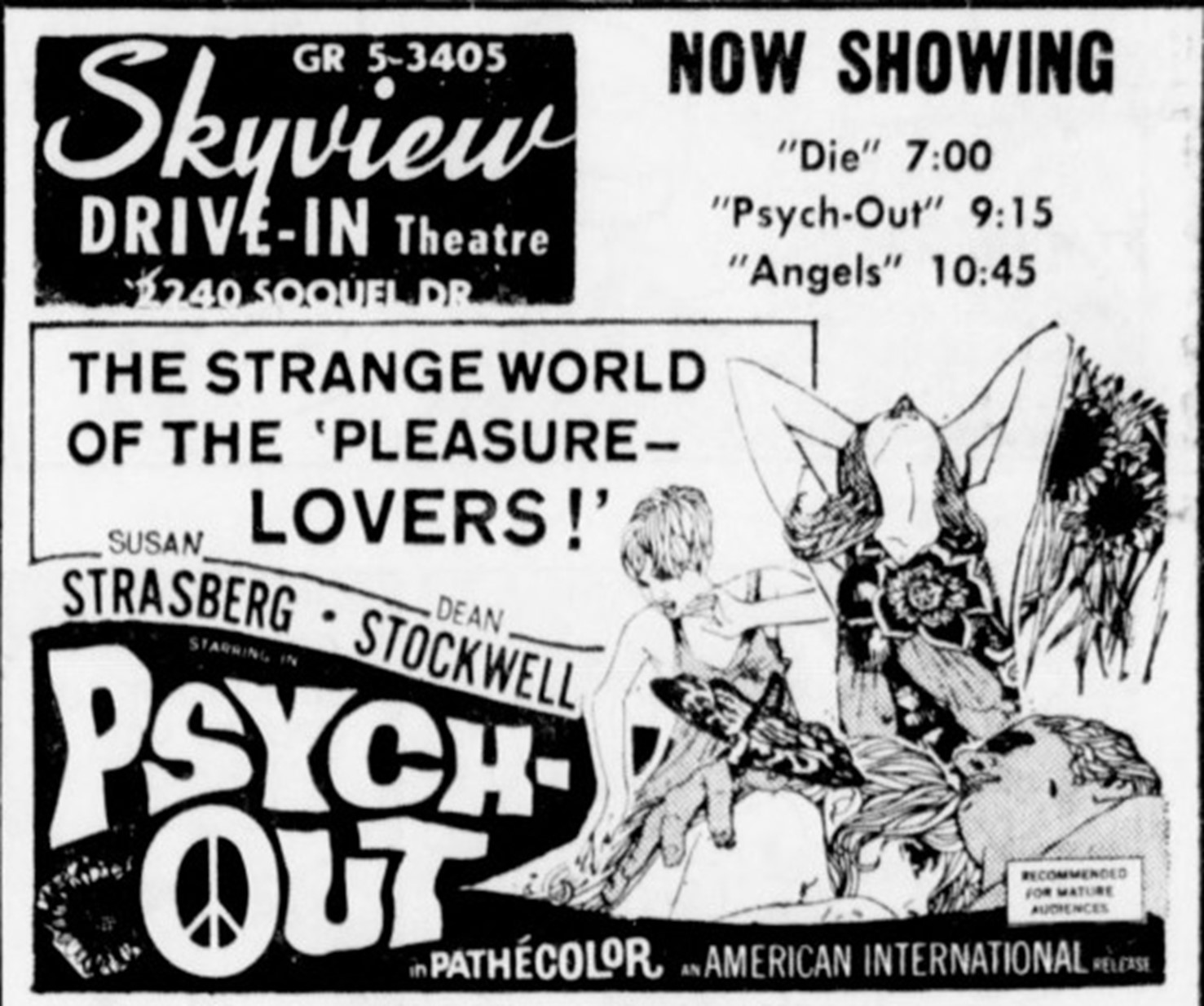
Drive-in advertisement for Psych-Out, 1968

In 1968, AIP launched a $22 million film program. The psychedelic and hippie scenes of the late '60s were also exploited with films like The Trip, also with Fonda, Riot on Sunset Strip, Wild in the Streets, Maryjane, Gas-s-s-s and Psych-Out with Jack Nicholson. These "social protest" films were also highly successful. Horror movies also enjoyed a revival of popularity in the late 60s.

==== International American International ====
In the UK, AIP struck up a film making partnership with Nat Cohen and Stuart Levy's Anglo-Amalgamated. Anglo eventually released over 140 AIP-made or owned movies in the UK, mainly on double bills. The arrangement also saw Anglo Amalgamated's British-made films distributed in the US by AIP. AIP's co-productions with Anglo included Cat Girl, Circus of Horrors and The Masque of the Red Death. AIP also had co-production arrangements with Tigon British Film Productions, Hammer Film Productions and Amicus Productions. Amongst the movies made under these arrangements were Witchfinder General, The Vampire Lovers and Scream and Scream Again. AIP maintained a production office in London until 1973 before it was closed down. Nevertheless, the company remained active in making and financing British films, including Hennessy and The People that Time Forgot. They were also, briefly, involved in setting up two Hammer projects- Vampirella and To the Devil a Daughter (AIP distributed the latter on its initial US run.)

On a trip to Italy, Arkoff met Fulvio Lucisano, an Italian screenwriter and producer who eventually headed Italian International Film, which co-produced 25 films in Italy for AIP. Due to importing completed productions from other foreign countries being cheaper and simpler than producing their own in-house studio films in America, AIP had released many giallo, peplum, Eurospy and Macaroni Combat war films featuring many American stars and Italian stars such as the comedy team of Franco and Ciccio. However, AIP released only two Spaghetti Westerns (Massacre Time retitled The Brute and the Beast and God Forgives... I Don't!), perhaps recalling their failure with Westerns in the 1950s. Many of these films were edited, rewritten with different (dubbed English) dialogue, usually by Arkoff's nephew Ted Rusoff, and sometimes re-scored by Les Baxter.

AIP, through Henry G. Saperstein, is known for being the major U.S. distributor for Toho's Godzilla and Daiei's Gamera (kaiju) films of the 1960s and 1970s. AIP also distributed other Japanese science fiction films like Frankenstein Conquers the World, Monster from a Prehistoric Planet, The X from Outer Space and the South Korean production Yongary, Monster from the Deep, as well as two Japanese animated features from Toei Animation, Alakazam the Great and Jack and the Witch.

AIP also released a pair of Japanese spy thrillers re-dubbed as a comedy co-written by Woody Allen called What's Up, Tiger Lily?.

The studio also released edited and English-dubbed versions of several Eastern Bloc science fiction films that had the dialogue rewritten for the American market and in some cases had additional scenes filmed with American and British actors. These include the Soviet film Planeta Bur (Planet of Storms) which was released by AIP in two different English-dubbed versions, as Voyage to the Prehistoric Planet and Voyage to the Planet of Prehistoric Women and the highly regarded 1963 Czech science fiction film Ikarie XB-1, which was re-titled Voyage to the End of the Universe.

A few years later, AIP backed a British Poe film directed by Gordon Hessler: The Oblong Box (1969) based on the short story of the same name.

==== AIP-TV ====
American International Television
- Type: Division
- Industry: Television production; Television syndication
- Founded: 1964; 62 years ago
- Defunct: 1980; 46 years ago
- Fate: Acquired by Filmways and became Filmways Television
- Successor: Filmways Television; Library: Amazon MGM Studios (via Metro-Goldwyn-Mayer Television)
- Products: Television shows

In 1964, AIP became one of the last film studios to start its own television production company, American International Productions Television (a.k.a. American-International Television or AIP-TV). AIP-TV at first released many of their 1950s films to American television stations, then filmed unsuccessful television pilots for Beach Party and Sergeant Deadhead. The company then made several color sci-fi/horror television films by Larry Buchanan that were remakes of black-and-white AIP films, and sold packages of many English-dubbed European, Japanese and Mexican films (the last type were produced by K. Gordon Murray) and foreign-made live-action and animated TV series (including Prince Planet). The best known animated series AIP-TV distributed was Sinbad Jr. and His Magic Belt.

In order to allay the fears of cinema owners who feared current releases would soon end up being shown on television, AIP issued a statement retroactive to 1963 that the company would not release any of their films to television until five years after cinema release, unless the film had not made back its original negative costs. AIP-TV also filmed specials for promotion of AIP films, such as The Wild Weird World of Dr. Goldfoot (1965, ABC) and An Evening of Edgar Allan Poe (1972, syndication), both with Vincent Price.

In 1978, AIP-TV distributed the pop music series Twiggy's Jukebox. For several years around this time, AIP-TV also distributed several British TV series, including The Avengers, to U.S. stations.

==== AIP Records ====
AIP started their own record label, American International Records, in 1959 to release music used in their films. There were a number of soundtrack albums as well.

AIP Records was once distributed by MGM Records, the record label owned by AIP's successor-in-interest MGM.

=== Going Public and Departure of Nicholson ===
In 1969, AIP went public to raise extra capital, issuing 300,000 shares.

In 1970, they entered into an agreement with Commonwealth United Entertainment to issue their films. In 1971 they released 31 films, their greatest number to date, and were seen as one of the most stable companies in Hollywood. Despite their exploitation roots, they did not concentrate on R- or X-rated filmmaking during this period.

In 1972, James H. Nicholson resigned from AIP to set up his own production company working out of 20th Century Fox, called Academy Pictures Corporation; its only two releases were The Legend of Hell House and Dirty Mary, Crazy Larry. AIP bought out over 100,000 of Nicholson's shares. He died shortly thereafter of a cancerous brain tumor.

Around this time Roger Corman stopped making films for AIP, focusing on his company, New World Pictures. According to Filmink "Corman leaving AIP coincided with Nicholson and Arkoff splitting up – they were like two parents who decide to get divorced when their eldest child finally moves out of home."

=== Arkoff alone ===
Arkoff continued on at AIP as president until the end of the decade. Heads of production during the 1970s included Larry Gordon (from January 1972 until early 1974) and Jere Henshaw (from 1977 until the demise of the company).

By the early 1970s, AIP felt the horror movie cycle was in decline and so switched to other genres, such as kung fu and gangsters. Notably, they produced some of that decade's blaxploitation films, like Blacula and Foxy Brown. In a throwback to the old "studio days", the company is credited with making Pam Grier a household name, as the majority of her early '70s films were made under contract to American International.

In the mid- to late 1970s, AIP began to produce more mainstream films, such as Bunny O'Hare, Cooley High, The Great Scout & Cathouse Thursday, The Amityville Horror, Love at First Bite, Force 10 from Navarone, Shout at the Devil, C.H.O.M.P.S. and The Island of Dr. Moreau. Though some of these projects did make money, the budget of their first all-star disaster film Meteor spiraled out of control – ballooning to $16,000,000 – and contributed heavily to the company's downfall. In the meantime, the studio imported and released its final foreign film, an Australian film, Mad Max, dubbed into American English.

James Nicholson's first wife Sylvia was still a major shareholder of the company. She sued AIP for mismanagement, but this was resolved in 1978 when AIP bought out her shares.

=== Merger with Filmways ===
By the late 1970s, filmmaking costs continued to rise, AIP's tactic of moving into bigger budgeted quality pictures was not paying off at the box office, and Arkoff began to think of merging the company. "We've been the Woolworths of the movie business, but Woolworths is being out priced", said Arkoff. Talks began with Filmways, Incorporated. Negotiations stalled for a while, but resumed a number of months later. In 1979, prompted by the failure of Meteor at the box office. AIP was sold to Filmways for $30 million and became a subsidiary production unit thereof, renamed Filmways Pictures in 1980.

Arkoff was unhappy with the direction of the company and resigned to set up his own production company, receiving a pay out worth $1.4 million.

AIP-TV was absorbed as the wholly owned program syndication arm of Filmways Television. Filmways was later bought by Orion Pictures Company in 1982 and Filmways was later renamed Orion Pictures Corporation, but retained the distribution arm. This allowed Orion to establish its own distribution, after utilizing Warner Bros. for distribution. Warner Bros. still has distribution rights to Orion films which were originally distributed by this company. Today, a majority of the AIP library is owned by Amazon MGM Studios (via American International Pictures). The American International name is still a registered trademark owned by Amazon MGM Studios.

=== Relaunch ===
On October 7, 2020, it was announced that Metro-Goldwyn-Mayer relaunched AIP as a label for films that the studio will acquire for digital and limited theatrical releases. MGM will oversee AIP's new films across all streaming platforms and the theatrical releases of them will be handled by its joint distribution venture United Artists Releasing. The first film from the relaunched AIP was Breaking News in Yuba County, directed by Tate Taylor and starring Allison Janney, which was released on February 12, 2021.

On May 17, 2021, technology company Amazon entered negotiations to acquire MGM and even made a bid for about $9 billion. The negotiations are made with Anchorage Capital Kevin Ulrich. On May 26, 2021, it was officially announced that MGM will be acquired by Amazon for $8.45 billion, subject to regulatory approvals and other routine closing conditions; with the studio continuing to operate as a label under the new parent company, which includes AIP and its titles. The merger was finalized on March 17, 2022. On March 4, 2023, Amazon shut down UAR's operations and folded them into MGM. In May 2023, Amazon Studios created Amazon MGM Studios Distribution, an international film and television distribution unit for both MGM and Amazon projects, which will include new projects and acquisitions from AIP.

=== Legacy ===
In 2005, less than four years after the death of Arkoff, filmmaker and Troublemaker Studios co-founder Robert Rodriguez founded a horror genre film and television company called Rodriguez International Pictures, which is a homage to the company.

== Film library ==
=== Unproduced films ===
The following films were announced for production by AIP, but never made:

- an adaptation of H. Rider Haggard's She (1958, dir. Roger Corman)
- Even and the Dragon (1958, dir. Stanley Shpetner)
- Take Me to Your Leader (1958) – a part-animated feature
- Aladdin and the Giant (1959) – produced by Herman Cohen
- In the Year 2889 (1959) – from the novel by Jules Verne
- The Talking Dog (1959) – a comedy
- When the Sleeper Wakes from the novel by H. G. Wells (1960–62) – Vincent Price was announced as a star in 1965
- a color remake of Fritz Lang's Metropolis (1961)
- Genghis Khan (1960s, dir. Jacques Tourneur) – a Roadshow production with a $4.5 million budget
- The Great Deluge – story of Noah's Ark
- War of the Planets (1962) – a $2 million sci-fi epic starring Vincent Price and Boris Karloff based on a script by Harlan Ellison
- Off on a Comet (1962) – a filming of Jules Verne's novel advertised in comic books
- Stratofin (1962) based on Jules Verne's Master of the World
- It's Alive (1963) with Peter Lorre, Harvey Lembeck and Elsa Lanchester
- Something in the Walls (1963)
- The Magnificent Leonardi (1963) – with Ray Milland
- Sins of Babylon (1963)
- Rumble (1963) with Avalon and Funicello from a book by Harlan Ellison about New York gangs
- The Graveside Story (1964) – with Price, Karloff, Lorre and Elsa Lanchester
- The Gold Bug (1964) with Price, Lorre and Lanchester
- The Chase (circa 1965) – a silent comedy starring Buster Keaton
- Malibu Madness (1965)
- The Haunted Palace (1965)
- Seven Footprints to Satan (1965)
- The Jet Set or Jet Set Party (1964, dir. William Asher) – with Avalon and Funicello
- Malibu Madness (1965)
- Robin Hood Jones (1966, dir. William Asher) – a musical about Robin Hood starring Price, Avalon, Funicello and Susan Hart
- Cruise Party (1966) – with Avalon and Dwayne Hickman
- The Girl in the Glass Bikini (1966, dir. William Asher) – a sci-fi/comedy with Avalon, Funicello and Aron Kincaid
- The Girl in the Glass Castle (1966) – a musical comedy with a $1 million budget
- The Hatfields and the McCoys (1966) – a musical with Avalon and Funicello
- It (1967) – based on Richard Matheson's story "Being"
- The Golem (1967)

=== Financial earnings ===
- 1970 – $22.7 million
- 1971 – $21.4 million
- 1972 – $24 million
- 1973 – $24.5 million – profit $744,000
- 1974 – $32.5 million – profit of $931,400
- 1975 – $48.2 million
- 1978 – $51.2 million – profit $1.8 million
