= Rock All Night =

1957 film by Roger Corman

- Original film poster by Albert Kallis
- Directed by: Roger Corman
- Written by: Charles B. Griffith
- Based on: The Little Guy by David P. Harmon
- Produced by: Roger Corman
- Starring: Dick Miller; Abby Dalton; Russell Johnson; Mel Welles; Ed Nelson; Clegg Hoyt
- Cinematography: Floyd Crosby
- Production company: Sunset Productions
- Distributed by: American International Pictures
- Release date: April 24, 1957
- Running time: 61 min.
- Country: United States
- Language: English

Rock All Night is a 1957 crime drama film produced and directed by Roger Corman. Distributed by American International Pictures, it is based on a 25-minute television episode of The Jane Wyman Show from 1955 called "The Little Guy". It stars Dick Miller, Russell Johnson and Abby Dalton. It co-stars Mel Welles, Ed Nelson and Clegg Hoyt. The film was released as a double feature with Dragstrip Girl.

== Plot ==
The action starts at a nightclub where The Platters sing two songs. A bitter man called Shorty is kicked out of the club after arguing with a couple. He goes to a nearby bar owned by Al, who is wary about Shorty.

A talent agent, Sir Bop, has persuaded Al to let his client, Julie, audition as a singer. Other inhabitants of the bar include Steve, a journalist looking for a story. Nervous Julie sings a song poorly.

Angie, a truck driver, and his girl friend Mabel come to the bar. Angie tries to start a fight with Shorty, but the latter pulls a knife. Lester, a boxer, his wife Syl and manager Marty also enter the bar – as do two hoods, Jigger and Joey, and gangster, Jerry, who is putting pressure on Al to pay protection and who is interested in Julie.

Sir Bop leaves the bar and Shorty picks a fight with the overbearing Jerry. A young man, Pete, arrives with news that a nearby grocery store has been robbed and its two owners killed. Pete recognises Jigger and Jerry as those responsibly for the crime. Jigger shoots Pete dead and the bar turns into a siege situation.

Jigger orders Julie to sing to give the impression all is well and she sings well. The police determine both Jigger and Joey are inside and threaten to come in. Shorty talks down Jigger and disarms Joey and arranges for them to surrender.

The Kid decides to quit boxing. The police arrest Jerry for extortion. Julie tells Sir Bop she is quitting singing and Shorty invites her to go see King Kong at the movies.

== Cast ==
- Abby Dalton as Julie
- Dick Miller as "Shorty"
- Russell Johnson as "Jigger"
- Mel Welles as Sir Bop
- Ed Nelson as Pete
- Clegg Hoyt as Marty
- Jeanne Cooper as Mabel
- Barboura Morris as Syl
- Chris Alcaide as Angie
- Richard Karlan as Jerry
- Bruno VeSota as Charlie
- Richard H. Cutting as Steve

== Production ==
In October 1956 Roger Corman bought the rights to "Little Guy" from Jane Wyman for his production company Sunset Productions. Dane Clark was originally sought to play the lead.

AIP had signed The Platters to appear in a film and asked Roger Corman if he had anything suitable. Corman decided to use The Little Guy. Corman gave the script to Charles B. Griffith to expand into a feature. Mel Welles later claimed Corman wanted Griffith to turn the story "into a rock script to emulate the success of Rock Around the Clock and all those pictures were having."

According to Corman, the Platters were only available for one day and that day was not in Corman's schedule. "That put quite a bit of pressure on us, considering the entire script had been written around the Platters", said Corman. "We had to re-write it again, quickly. In the final film, The Platters are only included in the first ten minutes of the plot. That might have upset a few moviegoers who walked into the theater because of the star billing the group received."

Griffith says he wrote the script over the weekend:

I cut it up with a pair of scissors, this original screenplay, and added new characters like Sir Bop, which was to be played by Lord Buckley, but Mel Welles ended up playing it because Buckley was out of town. Mel wrote his own "hiptionary" for sale in the theatre to go with it. Dick Miller was in the Dane Clark part. He was the little guy of the title. The music was by Buck Ram, The Platters and those people all doing their hit songs. Of course, no songs were written in 24 hours... I would just put down "musical number here". The girl has her dialogue with the guys and then turns around to sing a song. It was up to them what she sang, up to Roger.

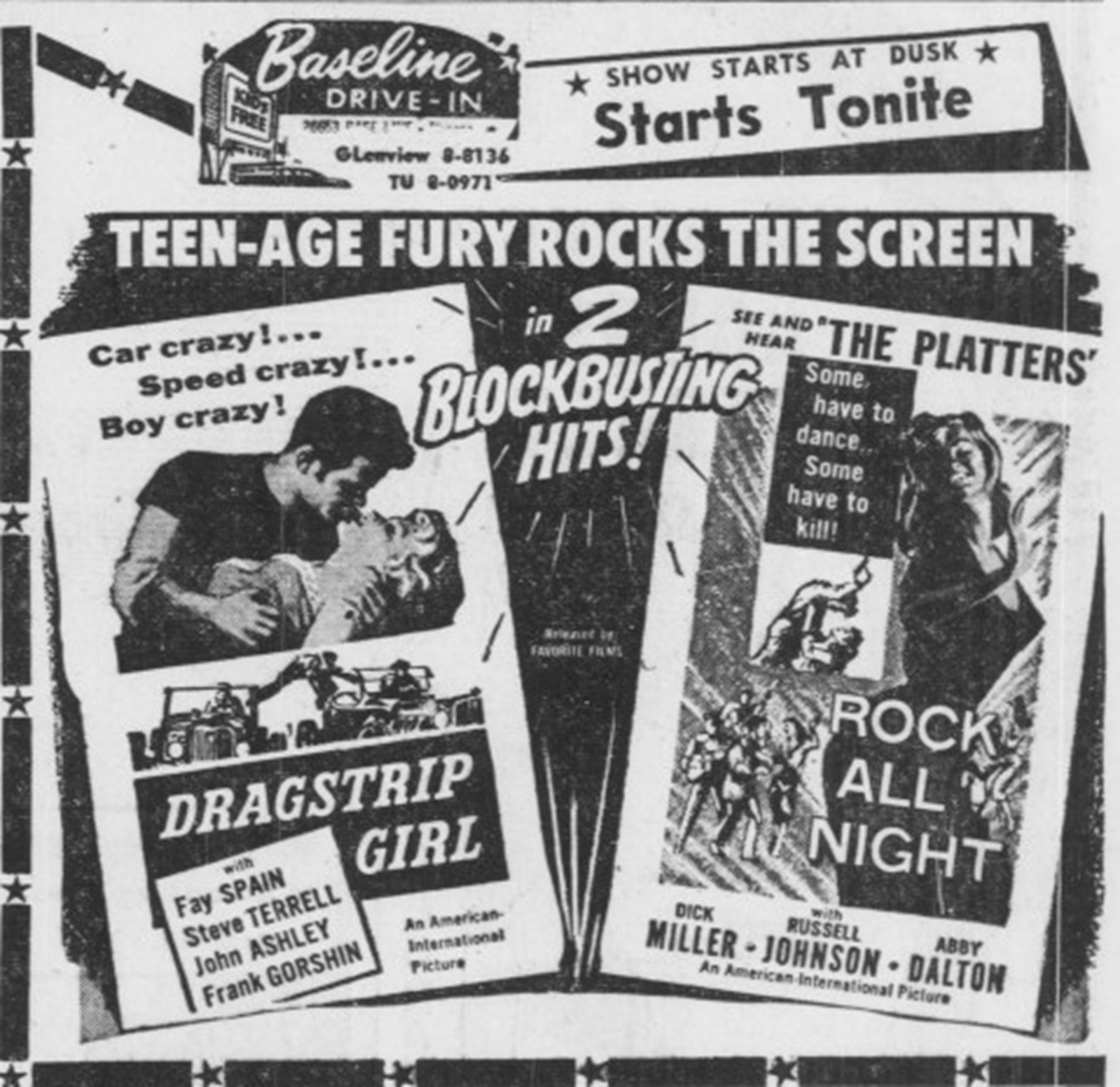
Drive-in advertisement from 1957 for Rock All Night and co-feature, Dragstrip Girl.

The film was at one stage known as Rock'n'Roll Girl.

Songwriter and manager Buck Ram offered a slew of his musical talent such as The Platters, accompanied by the Eddie Beal sextet with Eric Dolphy on baritone saxophone, The Blockbusters, and Nora Hayes to AIP in return for having the sole rights to a soundtrack album for the film. Corman filmed Ram's acts lip-synching their tunes on a separate set that comprise the beginning of the film. Rock All Night was made in five days and originally appeared as a double feature with Dragstrip Girl.

Comedian Lord Buckley had planned to be in the film, but when he was unavailable, one of Corman's stock company and a writer for Buckley, Mel Welles imitated Buckley in the role of "Sir Bop". Corman was worried no one would understand what Wells was saying so Wells wrote a dictionary of hip talk for the film.

Dick Miller, a former Navy boxing champion, played the role Dane Clark did in the television show, with Russell Johnson playing the role that Lee Marvin originated. It was the first film for Abby Dalton, who had been introduced to Corman through a friend; she made several films for the director and introduced him to Jeff Corey.

Corman said "To get the film shot within a week, I'd go all day with just the lunch break, then shoot till dinner time. Then after a bite to eat, I'd work on the next day's shots and production problems, get a few hours' sleep and begin again the next day."

Despite the short shooting schedule and minimal locations (only two sets), Corman always regarded the movie as a personal favourite. In 1982 Corman said "I haven't seen the film in the longest time and have no idea of what it would look like today, but I remember it as a warm, funny story. It might seem a little bit static on the screen today because it was shot, largely, on one set. I loved it at the time."

== Reception ==
Variety gave it a poor review, calling it "a weirdie—on the order of – "Time of Your Life"—to the rhythm of rock *n’ roll. Extremely mediocre, and drawing unintended guffaws at its matjnee bow here... Only the performance (very good, especially considering the so-so production and direction) of Dick Miller in the lead keeps the audience's interest in the film from disintegrating. The musical break-ins are unimpressive, and of the supporting cast, only Robin Morse (as the bartender) and Mel Welles (as smalltime hip-talking agent) manage to make any impression."

== Legacy ==
In 1993 Showtime announced they would remake a number of AIP films of the 1950s. Quentin Tarantino was linked to remake Rock All Night, but the film was never made.

Robert Rodriguez got the idea to make Grindhouse after seeing a poster on Tarantino's wall advertising Rock All Night alongside Dragstrip Girl. Rock All Night influenced Tarantino on Death Proof, with its bar setting, double bill nature, and change in tone.

== See also ==
- List of American films of 1957
