= Motorcycle Gang (1957 film) =

Film by Edward L. Cahn

- Directed by: Edward L. Cahn
- Written by: Lou Rusoff
- Produced by: Alex Gordon
- Starring: John Ashley
- Music by: Albert Glasser
- Production company: Golden State Productions
- Distributed by: American International Pictures (US); Anglo-Amalgamated (UK)
- Release date: October 22, 1957
- Running time: 79 minutes
- Country: United States
- Language: English
- Budget: $100,000

Motorcycle Gang is a 1957 film which is a semi-remake of Dragstrip Girl. It was released by American International Pictures as a double feature with Sorority Girl.

== Cast ==
- Anne Neyland as Terry Lindsay
- Steve Terrell as Randy
- John Ashley as Nick Rogers
- Carl Switzer as Speed
- Raymond Hatton as Uncle Ed
- Russ Bender as Lt. Joe Watson
- Jean Moorhead as Marilyn
- Scott Peters as Hank
- Eddie Kafafian as Jack
- Shirley Falls as Darlene
- Aki Aleong as Cyrus Q. Wong
- Wayne Taylor as Phil

== Production ==
The film was announced in March 1957. Lance Fuller was going to star.

Filming was held up when star John Ashley was drafted into the army. It was shot during two weeks when he was on leave after basic training.

The cast also included former Our Gang star Carl Switzer.

== Reception ==
The Los Angeles Times called it "commendably free of unhealthy sensationalism... tells its unpretentious little moral simply enough."

The Monthly Film Bulletin said the film "without being positively vicious... has its fair share of violence and unpleasantness."

Diabolique magazine claimed Ashley gave the best performance.

== Legacy ==
Film director John Carpenter listed the movie as one of his guilty pleasures. "Good guy teen Steve Terrell vs. cool bad guy teen John Ashley on motorcycles. Anne Neyland has some trouble deciding between them. Carl (Alfalfa) Switzer is the comic relief. Russ Bender tries to help testosterone-fueled teens go straight and narrow. Very cool."

== Theme comparison ==
1950s motorcycle gang interest, showing the same influence of female gentleness upon aimless, male youth, may further be studied in The Wild One.

== See also ==
- List of American films of 1957
- Outlaw biker film
