= Alex Gordon (writer-producer) =

British film producer and screenwriter (1922–2003)

Alex Gordon (8 September 1922 – 24 June 2003) was a British film producer and screenwriter.

He produced eighteen films, including the American International Pictures films Day the World Ended (1955) and The She Creature (1956). He wrote screenplays for three films, two of them with B-movie director Ed Wood, Jail Bait (1954) and Bride of the Monster (1956).

Gordon's brother Richard Gordon was also a film producer.

== Biography ==
Alex Gordon was a film publicist who served in the British Army. After his discharge in 1947 he and his brother arrived in New York. He worked for theatres, performed press duties for Gene Autry, then moved to Hollywood in 1952.

=== Ed Wood ===
In Hollywood, Gordon met Ed Wood and they collaborated on a script for a low-budget Western for John Carpenter, The Outlaw Marshall. The production was a difficult one and Gordon needed a lawyer; he ended up hiring Samuel Z. Arkoff who later established American International Pictures. The film became The Lawless Rider (1954).

Gordon had written two scripts, The Atomic Monster and The Hidden Face. Wood co-wrote the final screenplays and filmed them as Bride of the Monster (1955) and Jail Bait (1954), respectively.

=== American International ===
Arkoff set up a company, American Releasing Company which became American International Pictures. Gordon was one of their most important producers in the early days, usually collaborating with writer Lou Rusoff and director Edward L. Cahn.

Gordon's first film for the company was Apache Woman (1955), written by Rusoff and directed by Roger Corman. Gordon and Corman collaborated again on Day the World Ended (1955), a science fiction film that was very successful, and The Oklahoma Woman (1956), another Western. All these films were written by Rusoff.

Gordon's first movie with Cahn was Girls in Prison (1956), a women in prison film. Cahn also directed The She-Creature (1956), a science fiction horror movie with Marla English and Tom Conway, and Flesh and the Spur (1956), a Western with English and Mike Connors co written by Charles B. Griffith.

Gordon, Rusoff and Cahn then made Shake, Rattle & Rock! (1956), a musical with Connors and Margaret Dumont and Douglas Dumbrille (film buff Gordon always liked to put older actors in his movies), and Runaway Daughters (1956), with English, Anna Sten and John Litel.

Rusoff did not write Voodoo Woman (1957), with English and Conway, but he did Dragstrip Girl (1957) and its semi-remake Motorcycle Gang (1957). Cahn directed Jet Attack (1958), a war film. Gordon helped with the casting on Reform School Girl (1957) directed by Edward Bernds.

Gordon worked with a new director, Spencer Gordon Bennet, on the war film, Submarine Seahawk (1958). It was his last movie for AIP. He was unhappy with the company and left.

=== Later Films ===
Gordon produced The Atomic Submarine (1959) for Allied Artists, directed by Bennett. He wrote and produced The Underwater City (1962), directed by Frank McDonald.

His last feature film credits were two Westerns directed by Bennett, Requiem for a Gunfighter (1965) and The Bounty Killer (1965).

In 1968 he went into TV producing at 20th Century Fox.

He later wrote the documentary, Gene Autry: America's Singing Cowboy (1993).
