= Cat Girl =

1957 British-American film by Alfred Shaughnessy

The Cat Girl
- Film poster
- Directed by: Alfred Shaughnessy
- Written by: Lou Rusoff; Alfred Shaughnessy (rewrite)
- Produced by: Herbert Smith; Lou Rusoff
- Starring: Barbara Shelley; Robert Ayres; Kay Callard
- Cinematography: Peter Hennessy
- Edited by: Jocelyn Jackson
- Color process: Black and white
- Production companies: Insignia Films; Anglo Amalgamated
- Distributed by: Anglo Amalgamated Film Distributors (United Kingdom); American International Pictures (United States)
- Release dates: August 28, 1957 (Anaheim, California)
- Running time: 76 minutes
- Countries: United Kingdom; United States
- Language: English

The Cat Girl is a 1957 horror film directed by Alfred Shaughnessy and starring Barbara Shelley, Robert Ayres, and Kay Callard. It was produced by Herbert Smith and Lou Rusoff. The film was an unofficial remake of Val Lewton's Cat People (1942).

This was the first of two cat-related films starring Barbara Shelley, the other being the British Hammer film The Shadow of the Cat (1961).

== Plot ==
Leonora Johnson is a young woman who returns to her ancestral home and is told by her uncle Edmund Brandt of her legacy – she will inherit the large ancestral home and money, but also a family curse: she will be possessed by the spirit of a leopard, as members of her family have been for centuries. Edmund is then killed by his pet leopard, fulfilling the curse, which states that its victims must die in their 70th year. A fruitless search is made for the leopard. Leonora's husband Richard, who had insisted on accompanying her to the house, even though she had been instructed to come alone, has clearly married Leonora for the wealth that is to come to her. He had also insisted that their friends Allan and Cathy, another couple, come with them to the house, mainly to expedite his affair with Cathy. When Leonora sees Richard and Cathy making love in the woods, she looks up and sees the leopard in a tree. The leopard then attacks and kills Richard, while Cathy runs away.

Leonora tells the police that she is a were-cat and responsible for Richard's death and that they must arrest her, but since Cathy saw Richard being attacked by the leopard, they believe Leonora is in need of medical help. Leonora's former boyfriend, Dr. Brian Marlowe is back visiting in the area. He is a psychiatrist and believes that Leonora is suffering from delusions. He asks her to admit herself to a medical facility, to which she agrees, but she senses that the leopard has followed her to London. Leonora becomes jealous of Brian's wife Dorothy, whose life may now be in serious danger. Will Brian be able to help her in time to save his wife's life?

== Cast ==
- Barbara Shelley as Leonora Johnson
- Robert Ayres as Dr. Brian Marlowe
- Kay Callard as Dorothy Marlowe
- Ernest Milton as Edmund Brandt
- Lilly Kann as Anna
- Jack May as Richard Johnson
- Patricia Webster as Cathy
- John Lee as Allan
- Edward Harvey as doorman
- Martin Boddey as Cafferty
- John Watson as Roberts
- Selma Vaz Dias as nurse

== Production ==
The film was the first Anglo-U.S. co-production from American International Pictures, who made the film with Anglo-Amalgamated of Britain. The two companies had a strong relationship and Anglo-Amalgamated distributed many AIP films in Britain. AIP put up $25,000 of the budget and a script by their regular writer Lou Rusoff in exchange for Western Hemisphere rights.

The script was originally entitled Wolf Girl. Director Alfred Shaughnessy thought the script was "ludicrous", and wanted to rewrite the script to make it more of a psychological thriller wherein the lead character Leonora Johnson (Barbara Shelley) becomes convinced that she is transforming into a monster, but it's all really just in her mind. He wrote "Rusoff listened patiently to my arguments but it soon became clear that he could not care less what I did with his script. He had been paid for it, and was mainly interested in getting his ‘first day of principal photography’ money and enjoying his trip to London, away from Mrs Rusoff."

When the AIP executives watched the film, they were furious. Samuel Z. Arkoff wanted to know "Where is the Cat Monster?", so they hired special effects artist Paul Blaisdell to create a furry cat mask and claws (in less than 3 days) to splice into the film's finale for its U.S. release.

The cameraman shot most of this extra footage slightly out of focus, making it look really shoddy in Blaisdell's opinion. Blaisdell also was disappointed at how little footage of his cat mask actually wound up in the finished film (the added shots comprised only a matter of seconds). Blaisdell took the mask and claws home with him afterwards, and used them to make some home movies with his friend Bob Burns at Blaisdell's Topanga Canyon home. The cat mask wound up being one of the "props" that got destroyed in the fiery climax of AIP's 1958 film How to Make a Monster.

== Release ==
Cat Girl was released on August 28, 1957, screening at the Paulo Drive-in theatre in Anaheim, California. It played with the film The Amazing Colossal Man as a double feature.

== Critical reception ==
Shaugnessy later wrote "Barbara Shelley was lovely in the film and gave a most uninhibited and dramatic performance. Indeed, she was so good in it that I believe it condemned her to a long career in horror pictures."

Variety called it "weak in all departments".

The Monthly Film Bulletin wrote: "This film inevitably invites adverse comparison with the more successful Cat People [1942]. Nevertheless it is not a negligible minor essay in the horror genre, after a poor start. Barbara Shelley is a little heavy-handed but none the less effective as Leonora."

In British Sound Films: The Studio Years 1928–1959 David Quinlan rated the film as "average", writing: "Britains scream-queen-to-be's first taste of horror: faily silly, it has some chills."

== Notes ==
- Rigby, Jonathan (April 1995). "Cat Girl". Hammer Horror. pp. 38–40<.
- Shaughnessy, Alfred (1997). A confession in writing. Tabb House. ISBN 978-1-873951-30-9.
