= Hot Rod Gang =

1958 film

- Theatrical poster, 1958
- Directed by: Lew Landers
- Written by: Lou Rusoff
- Based on: story by Rusoff
- Produced by: Lou Rusoff executive Charles Buddy Rogers associate Lou Kimzey
- Starring: John Ashley; Jody Fair
- Cinematography: Floyd Crosby
- Music by: Ronald Stein
- Production company: Indigo Productions
- Distributed by: American International Pictures (US); Anglo-Amalgamated (UK)
- Release date: August 1958
- Running time: 72 minutes
- Country: United States
- Language: English
- Budget: $100,000 est.

Hot Rod Gang is a 1958 American teen drama film directed by Lew Landers and starring John Ashley. The working title was Hot Rod Rock with the film also released under the title Fury Unleashed. American International Pictures released the film as a double feature with High School Hellcats. The production includes performances by rock and roll musician Gene Vincent, and was the final theatrical feature directed by the incredibly prolific Landers, whose career dated to the mid-1930s.

== Plot ==
John Abernathy III needs to lead a blameless life to inherit his father's estate, but he also engages in hot rod car racing.

== Cast ==
- John Ashley as John Abernathy III
- Jody Fair as Lois Cavendish
- Steve Drexel as Mark
- Scott Peters as Jack
- Helen Spring as Abigail Abernathy
- Lester Dorr as Dryden Philpott
- Doodles Weaver as Wesley Cavendish
- Dub Taylor as Al Berrywhiff
- Gloria Grant as Tammy
- Maureen Arthur as Marley
- Dorothy Neumann as Anastasia Abernathy (as Dorothy Newman)
- Russ Bender as Motorcycle cop
- Claire Du Brey as Agatha

== Production ==
The film was known during production as Hot Rod Rock.

== Soundtrack ==
- "Hit and Run Lover", performed by John Ashley
- "Annie Laurie", performed by John Ashley
- "Dance in the Street", performed by Gene Vincent and The Blue Caps
- "Baby Blue", performed by Gene Vincent and The Blue Caps
- "Lovely Loretta", performed by Gene Vincent
- "Dance to the Bop", performed by Gene Vincent
- "Choo Choo Cha Poochie", performed by Maureen Arthur

== Reception ==
The Los Angeles Times called it "a film of juvenile violence."

The Monthly Film Bulletin said "the comedy misfires woefully, the performances are overstated to the point of caricature and the general level is decidedly moronic."

Diabolique magazine wrote that "Ashley's limitations are exposed a little in this film – I don’t think he was a great comic actor – but it is entertaining and good-hearted."

== See also ==
- List of American films of 1958
