= Five Guns West =

- Film poster
- Directed by: Roger Corman
- Screenplay by: R. Wright Campbell
- Produced by: Roger Corman
- Starring: John Lund; Dorothy Malone; Touch Connors; Bob Campbell; Jonathan Haze; Paul Birch
- Cinematography: Floyd Crosby
- Edited by: Ronald Sinclair
- Music by: Buddy Bregman
- Production company: Palo Alto Productions
- Distributed by: American Releasing Corporation
- Release date: April 15, 1955
- Running time: 78 minutes
- Country: United States
- Language: English
- Budget: $60,000 or $75,000
- Box office: $350,000; 554,911 admissions (France)

Five Guns West is a 1955 Western film set during the American Civil War directed by Roger Corman. It was Corman's first film as director although he had already made two as producer. It was the second film released by the American Releasing Company, which later became American International Pictures.

The film stars Dorothy Malone, John Lund and Mike Connors. The cast also includes R. Wright Campbell, who wrote the screenplay. He is billed as "Bob Campbell" in the credits as an actor but as "R. Wright Campbell" as screenwriter.

== Plot ==
Five prisoners, due to be hanged, are given pardons on condition they join the Confederate army which is desperate for men to complete a mission during the last days of the American Civil War in its Western territory. Their given task is to go after a traitor and a shipment of stolen gold passing by on an unscheduled stagecoach run.

Skirting an Indian war party the gang, taken control by Govern Sturges, arrive at a former mining town deserted except for a woman, Shalee, and her alcoholic uncle, the stagecoach agent, both of whom they capture. Bored as they await their target the men begin fighting over the woman, until Sturges, who is really an undercover Confederate army officer, intervenes on her behalf. Both gradually become close, but bullets begin to fly with the arrival of the secret stagecoach and its Union army detachment, and the gang fall out over the chance of gold.

== Cast ==
- John Lund as Govern Sturges
- Dorothy Malone as Shalee
- Touch Connors as Hale Clinton
- Bob Campbell as John Candy
- Jonathan Haze as Billy Candy
- Paul Birch as J.C. Haggard
- James Stone as Uncle Mike
- Jack Ingram as Stephan Jethro
- Larry Thor as Confederate Captain
- James B. Sikking as Union Sergeant (uncredited)

== Production ==
=== Development ===
The film was the third movie produced by Roger Corman but the first one he directed, and his first movie in color. The second film he produced, The Fast and the Furious, had been bought for distribution by a newly formed company, American Releasing Corporation (ARC), headed by Sam Arkoff and James H. Nicholson. Corman had offers from other companies but said he chose ARC because the company were willing to forward him money in advance, which he could use to finance other films. In October 1954 ARC announced that they would make three more films with Corman's company, Palo Alto, over the next twelve months, starting with Five Guns West in November. ARC later became the famous American International Pictures.

Corman had directed second unit on The Fast and the Furious and decided to direct Five Guns West himself. This was announced in November 1954. Corman later said "the work by the directors on the two films I had produced was acceptable. But I thought, I can do better, more efficient work; I can make better films." Arkoff said "He almost had to direct and produce to be able to get on the screen in a short period of time with the amount of money available. If he hadn't been his own director, he couldn't possibly have made them so fast. If he hadn't been his own producer, he wouldn't have known what he as the director wanted."

Female lead Dorothy Malone had been in The Fast and the Furious. This was her first film following the death of her younger brother. Malone had Battle Cry and Young at Heart awaiting release when she made the film. It was one of a series of Westerns featuring Malone. Corman said he paid her and John Lund "as much as I could afford". Touch Connors was cast shortly after Malone.

Corman said the story idea was his but the structure and script was the work of R. Wright Campbell, an actor he had met through Jonathan Haze. Campbell was paid $200 to write the script - it was his first screenplay - and was cast in a key role.

Prior to filming, Corman's directing experience was limited to doing second unit on The Fast and the Furious and observing film sets on the lot at 20th Century Fox. In order to get some practice before starting Five Guns West, he shot an 8-minute short film on 16 mm over one day with some actor friends. Corman says he never bothered having this film processed and edited. He later wrote in his memoirs "if a young man came to me today with similar credentials there's no way I'd hire him. I'd tell him to go out and get more training."

=== Filming ===
Filming started on 29 November 1954.

The film was shot over nine days at Iverson's ranch in the San Fernando Valley near Chatsworth, and Ingram's Ranch, owned by cowboy actor Jack Ingram, who had built a Western town there.

Corman bought stock footage of Indians to use in the film. He says he prepared thoroughly for the shoot with the assistance of Floyd Crosby and art director Ben Hayne. Corman says Hayne was particularly helpful being a western buff and would assist Corman in doing sketches for each shot. The director says he was comfortable working with the camera but less so with actors.

Corman says it rained the first day. "This wasn't possible," he recalls thinking. "My first day! I hadn't even started and I was already behind schedule! I got so worked up and tense that I pulled off the road and threw up. Then I just leaned against my car in the rain and pulled myself together. I made it to Iverson's and after about an hour's wait the rain stopped."

Corman said he was "very, very nervous" during the shoot. "I had been confident about my work as producer, but as soon as I made the transition to director, I became shaky. I was so nervous I couldn't eat lunch for the first five or six days. All I could do was shoot in the morning and stare at the script and study it to find out what I was going to do in the afternoon."

The film marked the first time Corman worked with cinematographer Floyd Crosby, who would become one of the director's key collaborators. "He needed a lot less coaching than a lot of other young directors," said Crosby. "He knew what he wanted, he worked fast, and it was fun. Suddenly we were a team." Corman said Floyd "worked fast, which is important to me, and yet his stuff was always good. No matter how fast I moved, Floyd kept right up, and he could light a setup in 10–15 minutes flat, or even faster if need be, and we'd go. That's unusual—lots of people are fast, but you don't want to see the results. With Floyd, you didn't have that problem. Plus, he knew how to set up these really complicated dolly shots quickly. He was the best, and working with him was always a pleasure, professionally and personally."

Corman reportedly went over budget making the movie. Under the deal with ARC, Corman was responsible for all budget overages. In order to complete Five Guns West Corman obtained funds from the budget of one of his upcoming projects, a science fiction film then called The Unseen (which became The Beast with a Million Eyes). This meant that Corman would have to make the latter movie for less than $30,000.

However Corman said Five Guns West "was a breakthrough for me. With almost no training or preparation whatsoever, I was literally learning how to direct on the job. It took me four or five of these training pictures to learn what a film school student knows when he graduates." Before the film had even been released, ARC assigned Corman to another Western, Apache Woman.

== Release ==
Corman said the fact the film was in color helped put it in the top half of double bills through most of the US, although in some major cities it was a second feature.

== Reception ==
=== Box office ===
According to Corman both films made a profit. However the film struggled to recoup money because it often played on the bottom of double bills, which meant it received a flat fee instead of a percentage. Alex Gordon confirmed that saying "it soon became obvious that single B-pictures like these first three [The Fast and The Furious, Five Guns West, Apache Woman] would not work out for the new company — they played the bottom of twin-bill programming at $25 per booking. AIP would have to own both pictures to obtain percentage bookings." This would prompt AIP to revert to making movies as a package to release as a double bill.

In 1956 Jim Nicholson said ARC had to sell this film and The Fast and the Furious to television because of "short finances" but that they would never do it again.

=== Critical ===
Variety wrote "The entertainment values aren’t all they should be for the action trade, but pic should prove out for release intentions as a bill-filler." Picture Show called it "ably acted and directed".

In later years, Sight and Sound said "The direction is a bit creaky, but R. Wright Campbell's screenplay and the well-played friction between the titular quintet (led by John Lund) easily sustain interest."

DVD Savant found "The movie is less interesting for its quality than its place in the development of independent production. " TV Guide gave the movie 2 out of 5 stars, finding it similar to other westerns of the time. Variety found the movie acceptable for smaller venues, but found it to have too much talking and not enough action.

According to Filmink "Truth be told, the concept isn't developed the way it could be, and Lund looks like he's about to fall asleep, but it's a decent enough debut judged by the standard of B Westerns from this era."

According to John Lund's obituary, in Lund's "later days as a hero of westerns he proved generally rather boring, quite possibly because he was rather bored by the likes of Five Guns West and Woman They Almost Lynched."

== Home media ==
The movie is available online for free from several sites, including YouTube, and was released on DVD in 2003.

Currently, the rights for this movie are owned by StudioCanal.

== Proposed follow-ups ==
In February 1955, Corman announced he would follow the movie with Fortress Beneath the Sea, to be made off the coast at Baja; High Steel, a steeplejack story; Cobra, to be filmed in India; and an untitled film written by Campbell. Corman wanted Malone for Cobra. None of these movies would be made.

In June 1955 Corman said he wanted to reunite Lund and Malone in Reception, about a Confederate hero who brings a northern bride to his home in Georgia. That film was not made either.

However Campbell and Corman later made The Secret Invasion using the same basic idea.
