= Runaway Daughters (1956 film) =

1956 film by Edward L. Cahn

- Directed by: Edward L. Cahn
- Written by: Lou Rusoff
- Produced by: Alex Gordon
- Starring: Marla English; John Litel; Anna Sten; Mary Ellen Kay
- Cinematography: Frederick E. West
- Edited by: Ronald Sinclair
- Music by: Ronald Stein
- Production company: Golden State Productions
- Distributed by: American International Pictures
- Release date: October 31, 1956
- Running time: 91 minutes
- Country: United States
- Language: English
- Budget: $90,000

Runaway Daughters is a 1956 American drama film directed by Edward L. Cahn and starring Marla English, John Litel and Anna Sten. It was loosely remade in 1994. The film was released by American International Pictures as a double feature with Shake, Rattle and Rock.

== Plot ==
Audrey Barton is the teen daughter of rich, irresponsible parents. When school classmate Tommy brings her home from a date, they spy on Ruth Barton, her mother, passionately kissing a neighbor.

Audrey's girlfriends have troubled home lives, too. Mary Rubach has a strict father who doesn't approve of her boyfriend Bob being 20. Angie Forrest's mother is off honeymooning with a third husband. Angie is glad when her brother Tony pays a visit, bringing along his girl, Dixie Jackson.

Tommy tattles at school about what he saw Audrey's mother do. Taunted by another girl at school, Audrey gets into a fight and is expelled, putting her graduation at risk. Ruth shows no concern whatsoever with her daughter's dilemma, telling her that finding a man is more important than getting an education anyway. George Barton displays little interest in his daughter's situation, either.

Bob joins the Army and urges Mary to elope, but her dad beats him up. Angie's brother leaves for Los Angeles, leaving her depressed. When a birthday party for Audrey is spoiled by the grown-ups, spiking the punch with gin, Audrey's had enough. She takes her gift from her parents, a new convertible, picks up Mary and Angie and the three girls head for L.A., running away from home.

Knowing the police will be looking for them, the girls ditch Audrey's car and steal one. They look up Tony and Dixie, who find the girls jobs in a seedy dance hall. A remorseful Ruth hires a private detective to find her daughter. The cops come looking, too, investigating the stolen car, which Angie speeds off in, right over a cliff, resulting in her death.

Mary's dad relents, letting her join Bob at his army base. Audrey returns home, her mother promising that things there will be better.

== Cast ==
- Marla English as Audrey
- Anna Sten as Ruth
- Lance Fuller as Tony
- Adele Jergens as Dixie
- Gloria Castillo as Angie
- John Litel as Mr. Barton
- Steve Terrell as Bob
- Mary Ellen Kay as Mary
- Frank Gorshin as Tommy
- Jay Adler as Mr. Rubeck
- Nicky Blair as Joe
- Maureen Cassidy as Maureen
- Reed Howes as Henry Stevenson
- Anne O'Neal as Miss Petrie
- Edmund Cobb as Private Detective
- Snub Pollard as Mr. Fields

== Production ==
The script was allegedly based on an incident that writer Lou Rusoff came across when he worked as a social worker.

Anna Sten came out of retirement to make the movie. Tom Conway had a stroke during filming and was replaced by John Litel. The film was shot in nine days, only running two and a half hours into overtime. Male lead Steve Terrell was signed to a long-term contract by Arkoff for 15 films.

== See also ==
- List of American films of 1956
