= Day the World Ended =

1955 film by Roger Corman

- Theatrical release poster by Albert Kallis
- Directed by: Roger Corman
- Written by: Lou Rusoff
- Produced by: Roger Corman; Alex Gordon (exec. prod.)
- Starring: Richard Denning; Lori Nelson; Adele Jergens; Mike Connors; Paul Birch; Raymond Hatton
- Narrated by: Chet Huntley
- Cinematography: Jockey Arthur Feindel (as Jock Feindel)
- Edited by: Ronald Sinclair
- Music by: Ronald Stein
- Production company: Golden State Productions
- Distributed by: American Releasing Corporation (ARC)
- Release date: December 8, 1955; (Detroit)
- Running time: 78 minutes
- Country: United States
- Language: English
- Budget: $96,234.49
- Box office: $400,000 (part of double feature)

Day the World Ended is a 1955 American independently made, black-and-white, postapocalyptic science-fiction film, produced and directed by Roger Corman, that stars Richard Denning, Lori Nelson, Adele Jergens, Paul Birch, and Mike Connors. Chet Huntley of NBC, later of The Huntley-Brinkley Report, served as the film's narrator. It was released by American Releasing Corporation (later American International Pictures) on December 8, 1955 as a double feature with The Phantom from 10,000 Leagues.

The film's story centers on a heroic scientist, who with a small band of other survivors, faces off against a radioactive mutation following an atomic war that appears to have destroyed most of human civilization.

== Plot ==
An atomic war has seemingly destroyed most of human civilization, leaving the Earth contaminated with radioactive fallout. One exception is an isolated box canyon, surrounded by lead-bearing cliffs, in which former U.S. Navy Commander Jim Maddison lives with his daughter Louise in a home he has stockpiled with supplies in anticipation of such an apocalypse. Louise is engaged to be married, but her fiancé has been missing. She keeps his photo on her nightstand (actually a photo of Roger Corman).

Into this natural bomb shelter stumble several survivors, who by chance were inside the canyon when the atomic war occurred. After initially refusing to admit them, Jim relents when his daughter appeals to his humanity. Among the survivors are a geologist, Rick, who happens to specialize in uranium mining, and small-time hood Tony and his "moll" Ruby, who were on their way to San Francisco.

Two struggles for survival arise. The first is a simple question of whether the radioactive fallout will ever dissipate, and if so, if it will do so before the next rain comes, which will wash out what is in the atmosphere onto the earth, contaminating their shelter. The second threat comes in the form of a hideous radiation-mutated monster, which seems bent on killing anything it comes across, but only consuming those creatures whose flesh is contaminated by fallout.

A less obvious threat is the hidden menace of Tony. Although seemingly charming and helpful, his true character and intentions are that he wants the other men out of the way, so that he can have both of the women, especially Louise, for himself.

All three dangers coincide as the mutated monster kidnaps Louise. It then releases her, and she runs into a small freshwater lake, where the creature is obviously afraid to follow. Rick appears and attacks the creature, but it runs away as rain begins. Following the creature as it is being destroyed by the rain, Louise's mental connection with it stops as it dies. Louise claims the creature knew her name, implying that the creature was her missing fiance, likely mutated by the radiation.

Tony, having stabbed Ruby to death after she confronted him about wanting to be with the younger Louise, then steals Jim's pistol. He quietly waits to ambush Rick when he returns with Louise. As Tony takes aim, Jim produces a second pistol and shoots Tony dead.

Jim has been slowly expiring from radiation poisoning. He reveals that the rain is radiation-free and will wash away all of the remaining contamination, making the world safe to venture out into again. As he dies, Jim also reveals that he has heard voices of other survivors on the radio. After the rain, Rick and Louise, the two survivors, walk hand-in-hand out of the canyon (as the end card saying "The Beginning" appears on screen).

== Cast ==
- Richard Denning as Rick
- Lori Nelson as Louise Maddison
- Adele Jergens as Ruby the gun moll
- Mike Connors (credited as Touch Connors) as Tony Lamont
- Paul Birch as Jim Maddison
- Raymond Hatton as Pete
- Paul Dubov as Radek
- Jonathan Haze as a Contaminated Man
- Paul Blaisdell as the Mutant
- Roger Corman as Nelson, Louise's fiancé in a framed photograph (uncredited)
- Chet Huntley as Narrator (uncredited)

== Production ==
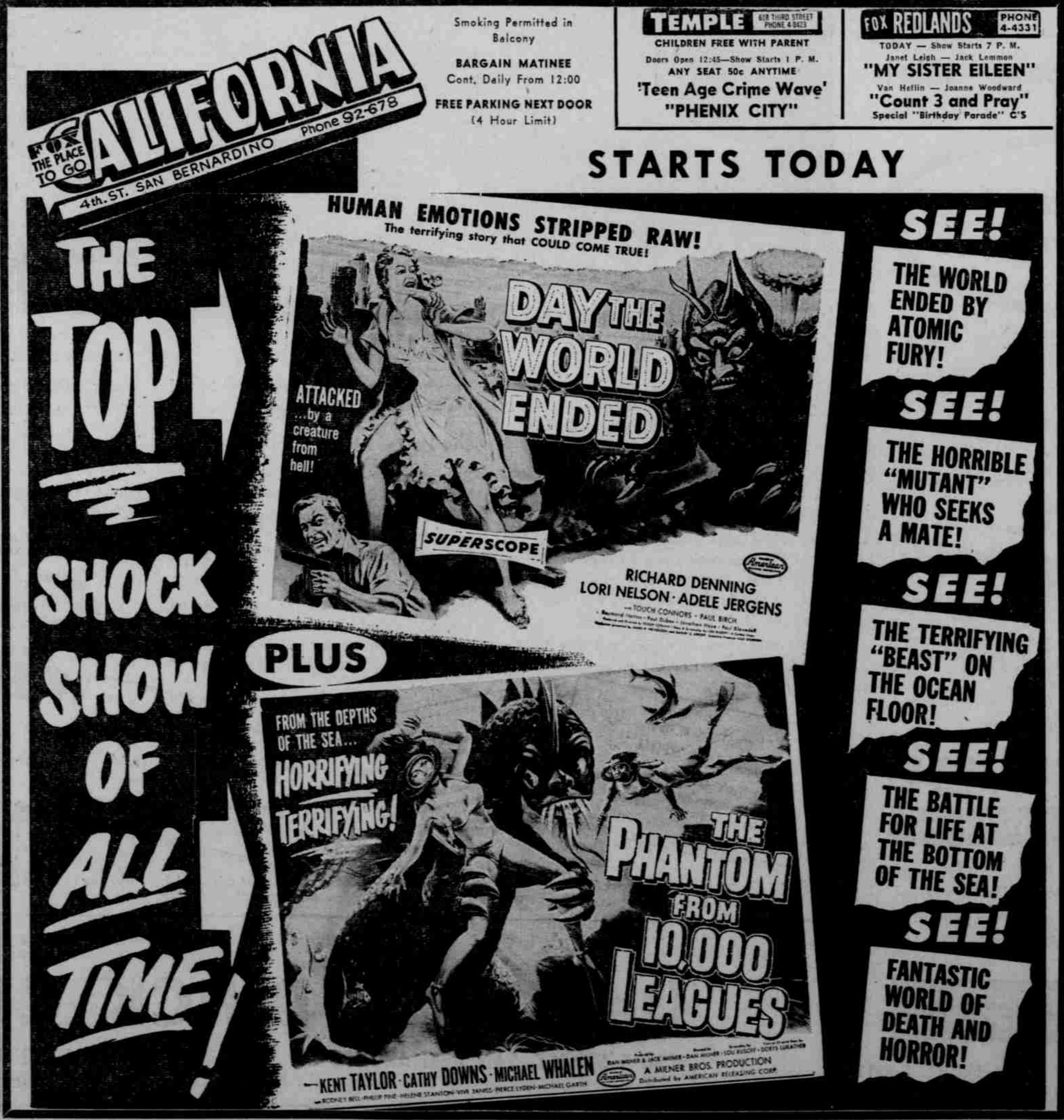
Theatre advertisement for Day the World Ended and co-feature, The Phantom from 10,000 Leagues.

Day the World Ended was announced in November 1954 as one of the initial releases of the newly formed American Releasing Corporation (ARC). It would be the second film made for ARC by Golden State Productions, after Apache Woman. James H. Nicholson of ARC came up with the title, then commissioned Lou Rusoff (Sam Arkoff's brother-in-law) to write a script. Alex Gordon later recalled:

To be on the safe side, Nicholson wanted Roger Corman to produce and direct. But he did throw me a bone as executive producer for Golden State Productions, because I was doing an awful lot on that picture. Not only did I get virtually the entire cast, except for Paul Birch, Jonathan Haze and Paul Dubov— Corman's regulars — but I also did any number of other things, down to being their office boy [laughs] and everything else! I figured I should get something there, so Nicholson said, "Well, you can be executive producer on Apache Woman and Day the World Ended."

Filming started on September 8, 1955, and lasted ten days, with a budget of $96,234.49.

Day the World Ended was the fourth feature directed by Corman, and his first in the science-fiction/horror genre. Gordon said Corman tended not to direct actors at this stage of the career. "Lori Nelson particularly needed help [from a director]; she was used to getting it at Universal", said Gordon. "One day, she was kind of saying, 'Gee, Roger won't tell me anything. I'm doing it the best I can, but he’s not directing me ...' But there was no crisis or anything."

Effects creator Blaisdell made the monster costume from foam rubber, with claws from a magic shop and toenails carved from white pine. Blaisdell himself played the role of the mutant. He purposely designed the costume to be very cramped inside, so that only a small man like himself could fit inside of it. Due to his height, he had limited visibility in the costume, which was particularly an issue in shooting the scenes of the monster carrying Nelson through the woods. He nearly drowned when the porous costume began to soak up water during filming the creature's death scene. The mutant costume was stored very poorly at AIP, and within the next few years, it had almost entirely rotted away.

Denning was paid $7,500, plus a percentage of the film's revenue.

== Release ==
The movie was released on December 8, 1955 on a double bill with The Phantom from 10,000 Leagues. The pairing proved popular with audiences, due in part to some savvy marketing by Nicholson. In January 1956, the films were released to 250 New England theaters, grossing $45,000 from 2 Boston movie houses alone in the first week. In February 1956, Variety reported that the film, which the magazine said had cost $65,000 to make, had earned more than $400,000, and was on track to make $1 million. The film had a $96,000 budget.

== Reception ==
TV Guide gave the film two out of five stars, finding it "silly but fun". Creature Feature gave the movie three out of five stars, similarly deeming it ludicrous but fun.

== Remake ==
American International Pictures (formerly ARC) commissioned Larry Buchanan to remake the film in color for television in 1967, under the title In the Year 2889. Buchanan worked from the original script, resulting in little difference between the remake and the 1955 movie.

In 2001 producer and special effects artist Stan Winston, remade the film as part of his Creature Features series.

== In popular culture ==
The film was referenced in a 2001 horror movie of a similar title, The Day the World Ended.

== See also ==
- List of American films of 1955
