= The Phantom from 10,000 Leagues =

1955 film by Dan Milner

- Theatrical release insert poster by Albert Kallis
- Directed by: Dan Milner
- Written by: Lou Rusoff
- Story by: Dorys Lukather
- Produced by: Dan and Jack Milner
- Starring: Kent Taylor; Cathy Downs; Michael Whalen
- Cinematography: Brydon Baker
- Edited by: Jack Milner
- Music by: Ronald Stein
- Production company: Milner Bros. Productions
- Distributed by: American Releasing Corporation
- Release date: December 1955
- Running time: 80 minutes
- Country: United States
- Language: English
- Budget: $75,000
- Box office: $400,000 (initial double feature release)

The Phantom from 10,000 Leagues is a 1955 independently made American black-and-white horror monster film produced by Jack Milner and Dan Milner (who also directed), that stars Kent Taylor and Cathy Downs.

The film's December 8, 1955 release was as a double feature with Day the World Ended, American Releasing Corporation's first dual venture. ARC thereafter changed its name, becoming American International Pictures.

== Plot ==
A mysterious, man-sized reptilian monster kills a fisherman at sea. Biologist Ted Baxter (Kent Taylor) and Federal Agent William Grant (Rodney Bell) discover the man's body, washed up on the beach and covered with radiation burns. They decide to investigate the strange death. After two young divers are killed by the monster, Ted and Grant decide to dive in the same location and investigate the area. They discover a glowing radioactive rock and are attacked by the monster, who is guarding it. Grant shoots it with a speargun allowing them to escape, but the creature survives.

Ted eventually discovers that Dr. King (Michael Whalen), another marine biologist, created the monster and the radioactive rock with a mutating device he invented in his laboratory. Meanwhile, foreign agents try to steal Dr King's scientific work, while Ted and King's daughter Lois (Cathy Downs) develop a relationship.

Agent Grant eventually captures the foreign agents after one of them kills King's secretary with a speargun. Ted finally confronts Dr. King about his creation, and deaths that it has caused. Soon after King witnesses a ship explode as it passes over the radioactive rock. Disgusted with the destruction he has caused, he wrecks his laboratory and goes out to the ocean to destroy his creations using dynamite. Just after planting the explosives near the rock, the monster grabs King, pulling him down. Ted, Grant, and Lois arrive just in time to witness the large explosion, which destroys the rock, the monster, and Dr. King.

== Cast ==
- Kent Taylor as Dr. Ted Stevens, alias Ted Baxter
- Cathy Downs as Lois King
- Michael Whalen as Professor King
- Phillip Pine as Agent George Thomas
- Rodney Bell as William Grant
- Vivi Janiss as Ethel Hall
- Helene Stanton as Spy Chief Wanda
- Michael Garth as Sheriff
- Pierce Lyden as Andy the Janitor
- Norma Hanson as the Phantom

== Production ==
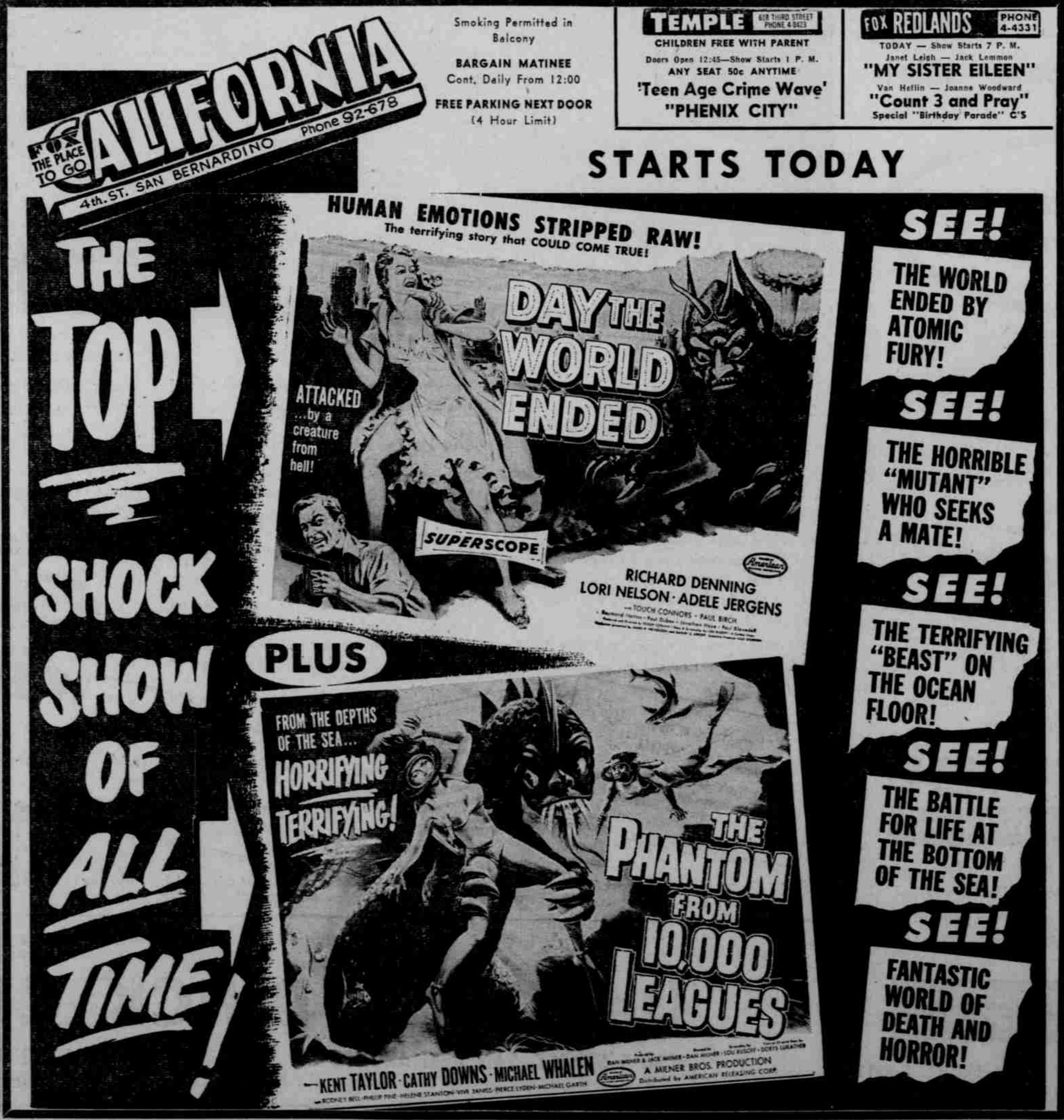
Theatre advertisement for The Phantom from 10,000 Leagues and co-feature, Day the World Ended.

When American Releasing Company began making low-budget films, they knew that if they made two together and released both as a double feature, they could make a larger profit. ARC's cofounder James H. Nicholson came up with the film's title, as he was looking for a feature to support and team with Day the World Ended. ARC lacked money to make both, so they allocated Phantom to Dan and Jack Milner, film editors who wanted to get into feature-film production. ARC and Milner split the costs 60/40.

Both films cost less than $100,000 each to make.

As planned, The Phantom from 10,000 Leagues was theatrically released on December 8, 1955 on a double bill alongside Day the World Ended. Both proved popular with audiences, due in part to savvy marketing by James H. Nicholson.

In January 1956, the two films were released as a double bill simultaneously in 250 New England theaters grossing $45,000 from just 2 Boston theaters in its first week. Within just two months of their release, the double feature had earned $400,000.

== Home media ==
The film has been released on home media numerous times by different distributors over the years, either as a single or double feature, due to the film's entry into the public domain. It was last released on DVD by Film Detective on June 29, 2017. The movie is also available on several online platforms, including YouTube.

== Reception ==
Author and film critic Leonard Maltin awarded the film his lowest rating of "BOMB". In his review, he wrote, "Lots of spy stuff and a lousy monster fail to enliven this deadly dull early American International effort".

== See also ==
- List of films in the public domain in the United States
- Midnite Movies
