= Lou Rusoff =

American film producer (1911–1963)

- Born: August 3, 1911
- Died: June 29, 1963 (aged 51); Los Angeles, California, US
- Occupations: Screenwriter; film producer

Lou Rusoff (August 3, 1911 – June 29, 1963) was a Canadian-born screenwriter and producer best known for his work with American International Pictures (AIP).

He was brother-in-law to Sam Arkoff and was the screenwriter for many of Roger Corman's first films. He was the father of Ted Rusoff.

== Career ==
Rusoff worked as a social worker and wrote for Canadian radio and television before moving to Hollywood in 1950. He wrote for a number of TV programs, then started working for AIP and became their most prolific screenwriter, usually writing scripts to match a concept and poster that AIP had come up with. Arkoff later said:

Often, he was working on five or six scripts simultaneously – not only his own but rewriting other people's screenplays when emergencies occurred and the original writers were unavailable. He also eventually produced some of the AIP movies he wrote... More than any other writer, Lou had a real appreciation for what we were trying to do. He understood how to keep costs down by limiting the number of sets and locations. He framed his scripts beautifully into our titles and artwork. And he always kept a sense of humour, which was a real virtue under hectic circumstances.

Writer Mark McGee said, "Rusoff's scripts were usually hackneyed and dull but they generally made sense." Filmink called him "competent, unremarkable" as a writer.

He worked his way up to vice-president in charge of production.

Rusoff died of brain cancer during the editing of his final film, Beach Party (1963).

He was survived by his wife, two sons, a brother and six sisters.

== Select credits ==
- Terry and the Pirates (1953) (TV series)
- Four Star Playhouse (TV series) – writer, director
- The Star and the Story (TV series) (1955) – writer
- Apache Woman (1955) – writer
- The Day the World Ended (1955) – writer
- The Phantom from 10,000 Leagues (1955) – writer
- The Oklahoma Woman (1955) – writer
- It Conquered the World (1956) – writer
- Girls in Prison (1956) – writer
- The She-Creature (1956) – writer
- Runaway Daughters (1956) – writer
- Shake, Rattle & Rock! (1956) – writer
- Flesh and the Spur (1957) – additional dialogue
- Dragstrip Girl (1957) – writer
- Cat Girl (1957) – writer, producer
- Motorcycle Gang (1958) – writer
- Suicide Battalion (1958) – writer, producer
- Hot Rod Gang (1958) – writer, producer
- Submarine Seahawk (1958) – writer, executive producer
- Ghost of Dragstrip Hollow (1959) – writer, producer
- Black Sunday (1961) – producer of US version
- Alakazam the Great (1961) – producer of US version
- Panic in the Year Zero (1962) – producer
- Marco Polo (1962) – English version supervisor
- Beach Party (1963) – writer, producer
- Operation Bikini (1963) – producer
