= Curse of the Swamp Creature =

1968 television film directed by Larry Buchanan

- Genre: Horror; Sci-fi
- Screenplay by: Tony Houston
- Directed by: Larry Buchanan
- Starring: See below
- Music by: Ronald Stein
- Country of origin: United States
- Original language: English

Production
- Producer: Larry Buchanan
- Cinematography: Ralph K. Johnson
- Running time: 80 minutes
- Production company: Azalea Pictures

Original release
- Release: February 1968

Curse of the Swamp Creature is a 1968 American-made for television horror science fiction film directed by Larry Buchanan. Although Buchanan was producing low-budget 16mm color remakes of American International Pictures sci-fi movies for television distribution around this time, he claimed this was an original even though it bears more than a few striking similarities to the 1957 AIP film Voodoo Woman.

Buchanan later said, "Never make a swamp picture. Your film comes back, and it's all... strange."

== Plot ==
Deep in the rural swamps of Texas, the reclusive and ruthless wife-abusing mad scientist Dr. Simond Trent is conducting experiments in his laboratory on the local impoverished voodoo-worshiping black "natives" in an attempt to discover the secret to reversing evolution, feeding the failures to the alligators he keeps in his covered outdoor swimming pool. When a party of oil surveyors comes upon his isolated yet strangely suburban-style home, he decides to take the final step and turn the duplicitous female leader of the expedition into a grotesque and virtually indestructible amphibious "Fish Man" so that he can take his revenge upon the world.

== Cast ==
- John Agar as Barry Rogers
- Francine York as Pat Trent
- Jeff Alexander as Dr. Simond Trent
- Shirley McLine as Brenda Simmons (aka "Mrs. Brenda West")
- Cal Duggan as Ritchie
- Charles McLine as Rabbit Simms
- Bill McGhee as Tracker
- Ted Mitchell as Valjean
- Roger Ready as Frenchie
- Bill Thurman as Driscoll West / The Swamp Creature
- Tony Huston as Tom
- Gayle Johnson as Mura
- Michael Tolden as Elderly Father
- Annabelle Weenick as Hotel clerk
- Patrick Cranshaw as Pilot
- J.V. Lee as Brother
- Naomi Bruton as Marcie

== Production ==
Despite showing the monster very prominently on the posters of the film, which bill it as an "underwater terror from another age," other than brief, partial glimpses down into the mist-filled glass tank where its body is being modified from its original human form, the titular creature (with its burly physique, bald head, Spock-like ears and protruding slit-pupiled, ping pong ball-shaped eyes) only appears at the climax of the film for less than five minutes before meeting its demise, and no scenes take place underwater.

The hospital gown-clad creature was created using primitive prosthetic make-up and grayish-green body paint rather than the infamously cheap and phony-looking scalloped-scaled rubber wetsuit (with webbed fingers) and fiercely-fanged fish head mask (with painted ping-pong-ball eyes) Buchanan later used in Creature of Destruction and 'It's Alive!'.

The movie was filmed in Uncertain, Texas, where the Fly-N-Fish Lodge and Airport seen in early scenes still exists.

The film re-uses Ronald Stein's previous music from both It Conquered the World and Invasion of the Saucer Men.

== Reception ==
Curse of the Swamp Creature has received predominantly negative reviews.

TV Guide gave the film 1/5 stars, calling it "[a] typically silly effort". Jon Condit from Dread Central awarded the film 1.5 out of 5, writing, "Curse of the Swamp Creature is actually one of Z-grade schlockmeister Larry Buchanan’s better movies. That’s not to say that it’s any good, just a comment that you can probably sit all the way through it from beginning to end without falling asleep or wanting to gouge your eyes out with your own fingers." Writing for AllMovie, critic Robert Firsching described the film as a "low-budget horror oddity" and a "forgettable trifle [that] will be of interest to genre completists only." Describing Jeff Alexander's performance as "so maniacally over the top that he’s almost fascinating to watch," critic George Reis wrote that the film "defines schlocky cinema as an art form in every way possible - from lousy acting, to shoddy camera set-ups, to an array of unintended laughs and a disappointing monster."

== See also ==
- List of American films of 1966
