= Bill Thurman =

American actor (1920–1995)

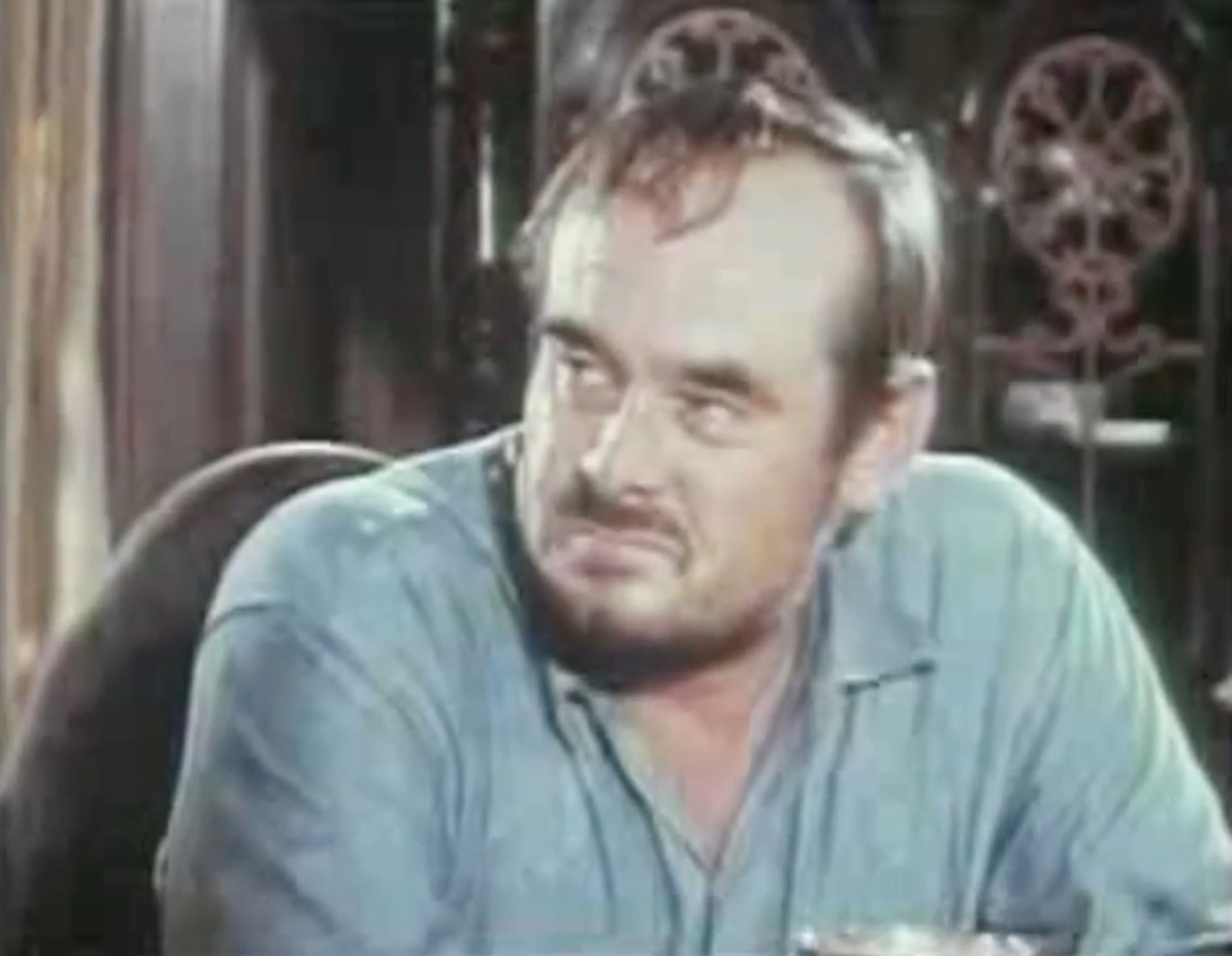
- Bill Thurman in the 1967 film In the Year 2889
- Born: Billie Thurman; November 4, 1920; Texas, United States
- Died: April 13, 1995 (aged 74); Dallas, Texas, United States
- Occupation: Actor
- Years active: 1963–1995

Bill Thurman (November 4, 1920 – April 13, 1995) was an American film and television actor. From the early 1960s until his death in 1995, he frequently appeared in B movies and independent films, often playing "redneck types" or sheriffs. He worked with low-budget-director Larry Buchanan on numerous films, for example In the Year 2889 and It's Alive!. Thurman was one of those Southern actors who specialized in "regional" pictures, films made exclusively for distribution in the Southern States.

However, Thurman also appeared in two movies by Hollywood star director Steven Spielberg and played Coach Popper, the apparently homosexual husband of Cloris Leachman, in Peter Bogdanovich's The Last Picture Show (1971). The character actor also appeared in popular television shows like Dallas and Centennial. One of his later roles was Reverend McWiley in the horror film Mountaintop Motel Massacre (1983).

== Selected filmography ==
- The Yesterday Machine (1963) - Police detective
- The Trial of Lee Harvey Oswald (1964) - Witness
- High Yellow (1965) - Major Bates
- Hot Blooded Woman (1965) - Railroad Tough
- The Black Cat (1966) - Bartender
- Zontar, the Thing from Venus (1966, TV Movie) - Sheriff Brad Crenshaw
- Curse of the Swamp Creature (1966, TV Movie) - Driscoll West / The Swamp Creature
- Spiked Heels and Black Nylons (1967) - Abel
- In the Year 2889 (1967) - Tim Henderson
- Shameless Desire (1967) - Cal
- Night Fright (1967) - Deputy Ben Whitfield
- Sam (1967)
- The Other Side of Bonnie and Clyde (1968) - Policeman (uncredited)
- It's Alive! (1969, TV Movie) - Greely / Monster
- A Bullet for Pretty Boy (1970) - Huddy
- The Last Picture Show (1971) - Coach Popper
- Encounter with the Unknown (1973) - Second Man
- The Sugarland Express (1974) - Hunter
- Ride in a Pink Car (1974) - Barlow
- 'Gator Bait (1974) - Sheriff Joe Bob Thomas
- Where the Red Fern Grows (1974) - Sam Bellington
- The Florida Connection (1976) - Deke
- Creature from Black Lake (1976) - Sheriff Billy Carter
- Slumber Party '57 (1976) - Mr. Willis
- Charge of the Model T's (1977) - Sgt. Bond
- Close Encounters of the Third Kind (1977) - Air Traffic #2
- Keep My Grave Open (1977) - Hitchhiker
- The Beasts Are on the Streets (1978, TV Movie) - Carl Evans
- The Evictors (1979) - Preacher Higgins
- Tom Horn (1980) - Ora Haley
- Skyward (1980, TV Movie) - Pilot #1
- Raggedy Man (1981) - Sheriff
- Mountaintop Motel Massacre (1983) - Reverend Bill McWilley
- Places in the Heart (1984) - Homer
- Innocent Prey (1984) - Jim Gardner
- Alamo Bay (1985) - Sheriff
- Silverado (1985) - Carter
- Hawken's Breed (1987) - Jeb Kline
- It Takes Two (1988) - Bus Driver
- Painted Hero (1997) - Old Man Bolen (final film role)
