= The Eye Creatures =

1967 television film by Larry Buchanan

- VHS cover for the film (using a repurposed poster originally made for The Crawling Eye)
- Genre: Comedy; Horror; Sci-fi
- Written by: Paul W. Fairman; Robert J. Gurney Jr. Al Martin
- Directed by: Larry Buchanan
- Starring: John Ashley; Cynthia Hull; Warren Hammack; Chet Davis; Bill Peck; Ethan Allen; Charles McLine
- Music by: Les Baxter; Ronald Stein
- Country of origin: United States
- Original language: English

Production
- Producer: Larry Buchanan
- Cinematography: Ralph K. Johnson
- Editor: S. F. Brownrigg
- Running time: 80 minutes
- Production company: Azalea Pictures
- Budget: $40,000 or less than $25,000

Original release
- Release: October 20, 1967

The Eye Creatures (a.k.a. Attack of the Eye Creatures [mistakenly written in the credits as Attack of the The Eye Creatures]) is a 1967 American made-for-television comedy horror science fiction film about an invasion by a flying saucer and its silent, shambling alien occupants.

The Eye Creatures, an Azalea Pictures film, was directed by B-movie director/producer/auteur Larry Buchanan and starred John Ashley. The screenplay was developed by uncredited writers Robert J. Gurney Jr. and Al Martin from the short story "The Cosmic Frame" by Paul W. Fairman (also uncredited). The film is a color remake of the 1957 black and white American International Pictures film Invasion of the Saucer Men, intended to fill out a package of AIP films released to television.

== Plot ==
A military briefing film shows a hovering flying saucer resembling a domed yo-yo as the narrator describes how the military's "Project Visitor" has been tracking it and anticipates it will land in the Central United States. After the briefing, Lt. Robertson reports to the base near the expected target. He berates his subordinates for their habit of using the monitoring equipment to spy on teenagers making out in the woods.

One of the teens sees an object land nearby and tells his friends at a local bar, including Stan Kenyon. Stan and his girlfriend Susan Rogers later accidentally hit one of the multi-eyed, lumpy greyish-white aliens from the ship with his car, so they drive off to call the police. Out in the woods, they are forced to use the phone of a grumpy local codger. The man resents the "smoochers" who use his property as a lovers' lane, frequently threatening them with a shotgun.

Meanwhile, one of two drunken drifters new in town comes across the dead creature and decides to put it on exhibition as part of his latest get-rich-quick scheme. When he returns to the site after excitedly rushing home to tell his buddy Mike, other aliens arrive, scaring him and causing a deadly heart attack. When the police finally investigate, they assume that Stan has run over the drifter and arrest the young man, refusing to believe his crazy story.

Having overheard the bar conversation about the UFO, Lt. Robertson reports to his commander, who reluctantly authorizes a cordon around the saucer. They eventually accidentally blow up the spaceship and congratulate themselves for their effective defense, not realizing that the creatures were not in their craft and are still roaming the woods.

Easily escaping from the police, Stan and Susan meet up with the dead drifter's friend Mike and the three of them attempt to prove the alien danger to the community. Mike is cornered and attacked by the angry creatures, but Stan and Susan manage to flee and accidentally discover the monsters explode when exposed to bright light.

Unfortunately, after the autopsy shows that the earlier victim died from an alcohol-induced heart attack and that Stan had not killed him, the police want nothing more to do with him and refuse to help. The teenagers then gather their friends together and drive out to the clearing where they left Mike. Surrounding the aliens with their cars, the teens use their headlights to evaporate the remaining creatures. Mike survives his attack, and Stan and Susan resume their interrupted plans to elope.

== Cast ==
- John Ashley as Stan Kenyon
- Cynthia Hull as Susan Rogers
- Warren Hammack as Lt. Robertson
- Chet Davis as Mike Lawrence
- Bill Peck as Carl Fenton
- Ethan Allen as Old Man Bailey
- Charles McLine as Detective
- Nathan Wyle as Colonel Harrison
- Tony Huston as Sergeant
- Jonathan Ledford as Cpl. Culver

== Production ==
Buchanan had made Free, White and 21 (1963), which was distributed by AIP. They hired the director to make a series of low-budget color remakes of 1950s AIP films, of which this was the first. Buchanan later called them "my wretched remakes".

The film was shot in 16 mm over several weeks in Dallas, Texas on a budget of $40,000 (some sources say less than $25,000). John Ashley was imported from Hollywood, but the rest of the cast were locals. Ashley has stated that his salary took up more than half the budget.

Most of the film was shot just outside Dallas at Cielo, a ranch owned by wealthy businessman Gordon McLendon. Ashley was the only professional actor, with the rest of the cast coming from local Dallas theaters. Ashley claimed that the film ranks "with some of the worst all-time horror films ever made... the monster looked like something out of the Michelin tire ad", but said it was a professional operation and that Buchanan treated him very well.

Larry Buchanan later recalled:

We got John Ashley on the weekend that his wife Deborah Walley said goodbye to him. And here I am with him on the set the next morning; he was in bad shape. Deborah had gone over to Arkansas on an AIP publicity junket for one of those "Beach Party" things, and John asked me if he could fly up and see her. I said, "John, we just started!" I sat down with him and worked it out, I shot around him for two days while he tried to reconcile with her. It didn't work. But it did work for me in that when he came back, he worked his tail off. I told him he had to make a break— he had a little money— and go as far away from Deborah as he could get. And we talked long into the night, about shooting, casting and making movies. I don't think we ever stopped on that picture. We would work all day and talk all night. And then he went off to Manila and began making those Bamboo-girl pictures and made a fortune.

Filming took two weeks. "Buchanan was a nice guy and it was a real 'at ease' pace," said Ashley. "We just kind of worked until we felt like, 'Okay, that's enough.' It was a very small crew and quite well organized - Buchanan had it together."

The film's title screen contained a notable error. In keeping with a frequent practice of B-movie re-release retitling, the phrase "Attack of the" was superimposed on top of the original title, which already included "The", producing the redundant title Attack of the The Eye Creatures. AIP didn't even bother to fix it.

== Reception ==
Diabolique magazine said Ashley does "solid leading man work, grounding an outlandish premise, though by now he was far too old to play a teenager." Film historian and critic Stuart Galbraith IV wrote that the film's production "fails on every level," that the performances are "mostly terrible," and that director "Buchanan's sledgehammer approach to comedy is painful." Critic Dave Sindelar wrote that the film was "flabbily directed" and was "a hopeless muddle of scenes that show either gross incompetence or gross carelessness".

The film was featured by Mystery Science Theater 3000, under the title Attack of the The Eye Creatures, on December 5, 1992, as episode number 418.

== See also ==
- List of American films of 1967
