= The Undead (film) =

1957 film by Roger Corman

- Theatrical release poster by Albert Kallis
- Directed by: Roger Corman
- Written by: Charles B. Griffith; Mark Hanna
- Produced by: Roger Corman
- Starring: Pamela Duncan; Richard Garland; Allison Hayes; Val Dufour; Mel Welles; Richard Devon; Billy Barty
- Cinematography: William A. Sickner
- Edited by: Frank Sullivan
- Music by: Ronald Stein
- Production company: Balboa Productions
- Distributed by: American International Pictures
- Release date: February 14, 1957
- Running time: 75 minutes
- Country: United States
- Language: English
- Budget: $70,000 or $75,000

The Undead is a 1957 horror film directed by Roger Corman and starring Pamela Duncan, Allison Hayes, Richard Garland and Val Dufour. It also features Corman regulars Richard Devon, Dick Miller, Mel Welles and Bruno VeSota. The authors' original working title was The Trance of Diana Love. The film follows the story of a prostitute, Diana Love (Duncan), who is put into a hypnotic trance by psychic Quintus (Dufour), thus causing her to regress to a previous life. Hayes later starred in Attack of the 50 Foot Woman (1958). The film was released on February 14, 1957 by American International Pictures as a double feature with Voodoo Woman.

== Plot ==
Quintus, a psychic researcher who has spent seven years in Tibet, wants to send someone back in time into a past life via hypnosis. He hires (for $500) a prostitute, Diana Love, and plans to send her into a trance over 48 hours so she can access her past life. Quintus' former professor is present to witness it.

Quintus puts Diana into a trance and sends her back into the Middle Ages, where she shares the body of her past self, Helene, who is in prison, sentenced to die at dawn under suspicion of being a witch. That night is the witches' Sabbath and, as tradition dictates, the townsfolk must kill any woman suspected of witchcraft to be safe for the rest of the year.

In her head, Helene can listen to Diana's voice. It advises her to seduce the cell's guard until she is able to knock him out with her chains and escape. The plan works out, and Helene escapes prison, earning the attention of Livia (the witch for whose crimes Helene has been blamed) and of Satan himself. Livia is in love with the knight Pendragon, who only has eyes for Helene. Jealous, Livia constantly tries to get Helene captured without Pendragon knowing. Meanwhile, in the professor's office, Quintus discovers that Diana has changed the past. However, this creates a new complication, because if Helene evades execution, her future selves, including Diana, will never come into existence. As a proof of that, bruises start appearing on Diana's body. To save her, Quintus uses the psychic link between Diana and Helene to physically go back in time. However, once in the past, he starts getting tempted by the idea of being able to witness the results of history changing by Diana's decision.

Meanwhile, Helene tries to survive through the night, knowing that if she succeeds, she will have a whole year to prove her innocence, as the witches' Sabbath occurs once every twelve months. Among the people helping her is Pendragon, the good witch Meg-Maud and the madman Smolkin. Moments before dawn, Quintus manages to reach her and explain the consequences of her continuing to live. Not knowing what to do, she tells Quintus to use his powers of suggestions to make her able to speak with her future selves. All of them have fulfilling lives and wish to keep on existing. After listening to them, Helene accepts her fated death and runs to the local executioner. Pendragon goes after her but is stopped by Livia, who tries to convince him to let Helene die. Enraged, Pendragon kills Livia and tries to save Helene but arrives too late. Moments before dawn, Helene dies at the hands of the executioner. Diana wakes up from her trance, having fully recovered. However, now that her link with Helene has disappeared, Quintus is left physically stranded in the past, much to Satan's amusement.

== Cast ==
- Pamela Duncan as Diana Love/Helene
- Richard Garland as Pendragon
- Allison Hayes as Livia
- Val Dufour as Quintus Ratcliff
- Mel Welles as Smolkin
- Dorothy Neumann as Meg-Maud
- Billy Barty as The Imp
- Bruno VeSota as Scroop
- Aaron Saxon as Gobbo
- Richard Devon as Satan
- Dick Miller as The Leper
- Paul Blaisdell as the corpse in the coffin

== Production ==
=== Script ===
The Undead was inspired by an interest in reincarnation during the 1950s (as was the film The She-Creature) prompted by the success of the book The Search for Bridey Murphy by Morey Bernstein. Film rights for this were bought by Paramount Pictures. Charles Griffith recalls:

It [The Undead] was originally called The Trance of Diana Love. Roger said to me, “Do me a Bridey Murphy picture.” And I told him that by the time Paramount finishes theirs, ours will fail. At the time, everybody was saying that they were making a bad picture. He just said that we’d get ours done ahead of theirs and clean up. So I did The Trance of Diana Love and it got shot funny, especially at the end, where you see the empty clothes before the revelation. It was in iambic pentameter and I had to rewrite it after it was ready to shoot because somebody told Roger that they didn’t understand it. Roger would give it to anybody to read or anybody out on the street. He’d send girls out with scripts.

Griffth later elaborated: "I separated all the different things with sequences with the devil, which were really elaborate, and the dialogue in the past was all in iambic pentameter. Roger got very excited by that. He handed the script around for everybody to read, but nobody understood the dialogue, so he told me to translate it into English. The script was ruined.

Mel Welles said "it was a wonderful script and it probably would have been the cult film rather than Little Shop of Horrors had it been shot that way. But either Roger or someone at American International Pictures didn't think it was commercially viable to do it that way and at the last minute a decision was made to rewrite the script without that."

By the time The Undead was being made, the popularity of reincarnation was starting to dwindle. Therefore, Corman decided that they needed to change it up a little and added the time travel elements of Quintus, and changed the title to The Undead.

=== Finance ===
In May 1956 Corman announced the movie was to be made for Walter Mirisch at Allied Artists. In July 1956 Variety reported that Corman would fully finance the film himself, although it would be distributed by AIP.

=== Cast ===
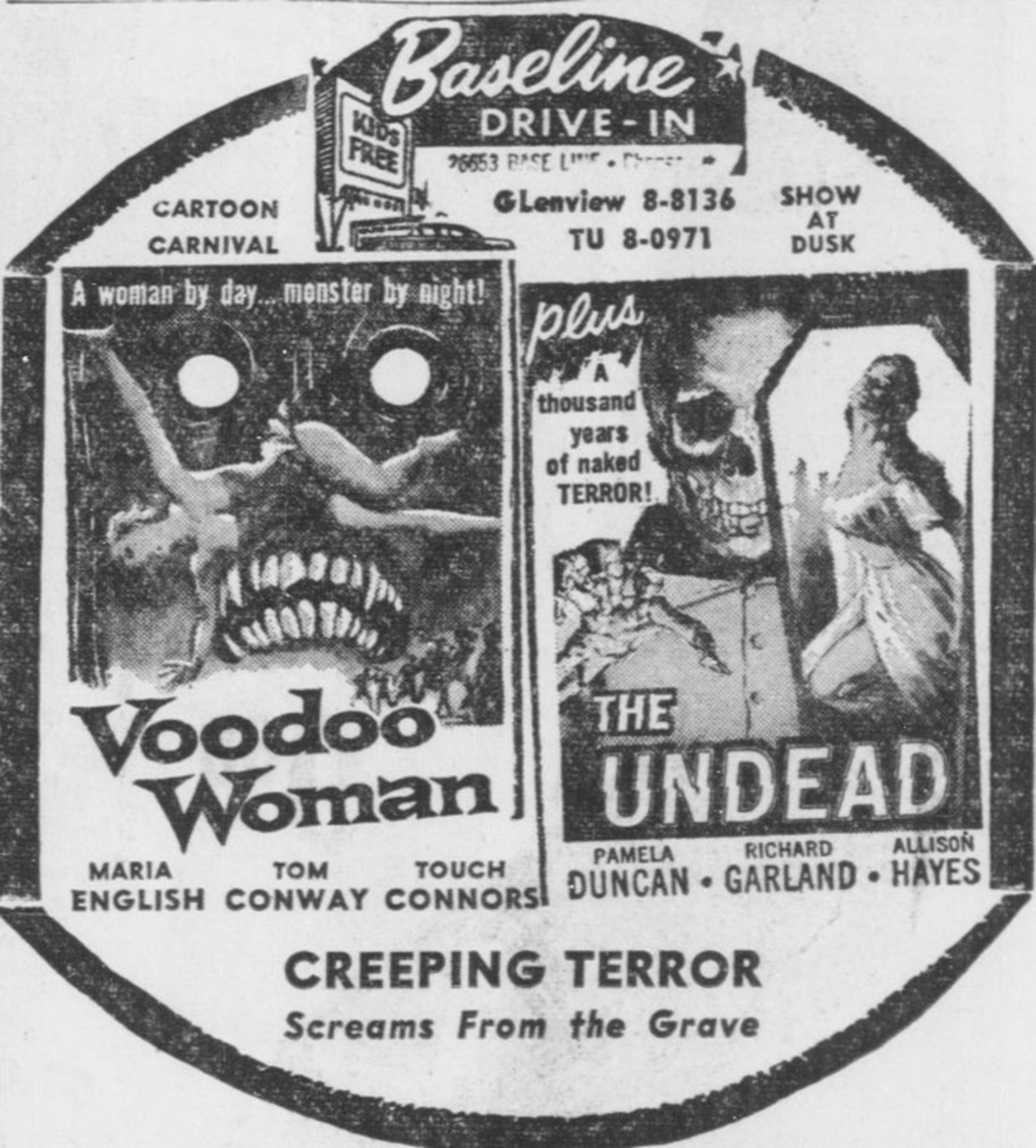
Drive-in advertisement from 1957 for The Undead and co-feature, Voodoo Woman

Pamela Duncan says Roger Corman called her up "out of the blue" and offered her the lead. "I don't know what made him think of me except that he must have seen me in something; I worked a lot and I was on TV a lot." She later worked with Corman on Attack of the Crab Monsters.

Mel Welles called his role of Smolkin "one of the best characters I ever played. I played him kind of insane and what was wonderful was the one of my reviews compared me to Stanley Holloway in one of his Shakespearean gravedigger roles."

AIP's special effects artist Paul Blaisdell was drafted to play the corpse in the coffin in the graveyard scene, which he said was a lot of fun. His eyes however were supposed to remain open and staring throughout the scene, and he said it was difficult because little particles of the coffin lid kept falling into them like dust.

=== Filming ===
Filming started on July 26, 1956.

The movie was filmed in a converted supermarket, and was completed in only ten days, according to Griffith, costing $70,000. Duncan says it was shot in six days. Griffith has also said "it was $55,000, fifteen trees with Spanish moss and a fog machine. That was a big deal for Roger then."

The bats that the imp and witch continually change into were left over from another Corman movie, It Conquered the World.

Griffith says the film was "a fun picture to shoot... We filled it [the supermarket] with palm trees and fog, and it was the first time Roger had used any of that stuff. He didn't like to rent anything. You could see the zipper on the witch's dress and all the gimmicks were very obvious and phony—Roger deliberately played to skid row, a degenerate audience."

Welles recalls "we almost died of asphixiation from all the creosote fog that was created in" the supermarket. Devon said "They had a bee-smoker to create the dreadful-smelling fog."

Some exteriors were shot at a location known as "The Witch's House", a storybook house in Beverly Hills.

The movie was the first of several Devon made with Corman. However he did not enjoy The Undead, saying:

(Corman)'s temper was really quite awesome. On The Undead, someone had left one of my speeches out of the script, so naturally I couldn't learn what wasn’t there. And he was not just upset, he was maniacal. Anything that cost a penny over his minuscule budget turned him into a monster... He was just screaming his head off. Everybody was telling him that it could be rectified, and I said [calmly], "Roger, it's all right, don't worry about it. We'll get somebody to write it out on a card or something and I'll read it." So one of the prop guys wrote it out on a little cardboard box and I read it. We did it in one take, and that was it.

Devon also recalled that "Mel Welles just played everything off the top of his head and he came out all right, but it was difficult to keep from looking foolish. Pamela Duncan pressed very hard, and Dick Garland worked hard, too. but everything was against them as far as the dialogue was concerned. It was just coming down around their ears. Everybody that was on the show was quite professional and they really tried. They really put forth an effort."

Pamela Duncan says she enjoyed working with Corman.

Corman wanted to use a crypt to launch the film.

== Critical reception ==
The Los Angeles Times called The Undead "a better than usual horror film... a rather imaginative yarn... for this type picture the acting is quite good... Corman has turned out a good product."

Variety said "The pacing Is slow and the thrills at a minimum... Pamela Duncan [is]... capable of giving substance to better material than provided here... others have a hard time with the material. Lensing by William Sickner, special effects, background score and other technical aids are okay for the budget and quick shooting schedule."

== Legacy ==
The Undead was later featured on Mystery Science Theater 3000 during its eighth season.

FilmInk called it "another wild, imaginative, well structured script from Griffith, some of it is downright silly on screen (dancing little people, the costumes) but the story has integrity and the ending is emotionally powerful. Oh, and Alison Hayes is terrific."

Joe Dante called it "very odd and ambitious... one of my favorites... there's a nice cast of Corman stalwarts... it really manages to somehow stand out from the crowd because it's got a tone that is very unusual for this kind of picture... It's one of the early flowerings of Chuck Griffith".

== See also ==
- List of American films of 1957
