= In the Year 2889 (film) =

1967 television film by Larry Buchanan

- Betamax Video Cover
- Genre: Horror; Sci-fi
- Written by: Harold Hoffman; Lou Rusoff
- Directed by: Larry Buchanan
- Starring: Paul Petersen; Quinn O'Hara; Charla Doherty; Neil Fletcher; Hugh Feagin
- Country of origin: United States
- Original language: English

Production
- Producers: Larry Buchanan; Edwin Tobolowsky
- Cinematography: Robert C. Jessup
- Editor: Larry Buchanan
- Running time: 80 minutes
- Production company: Azalea Pictures

Original release
- Release: January 19, 1969

In the Year 2889 (also known as Year 2889) is a 1967 American made-for-television horror science fiction film from American International Pictures about the aftermath of a future nuclear war. The film stars Paul Petersen, Quinn O'Hara, Charla Doherty, Neil Fletcher and Hugh Feagin. AIP commissioned low-budget cult film auteur Larry Buchanan to produce and direct this film as a color remake of Roger Corman's 1956 film Day the World Ended.

Although not set in the year 2889, In the Year 2889's title is borrowed from a short story of the same title by Jules Verne and his son, Michael Verne. (The film however did not follow the Jules Verne story at all.) The screenplay was written for Buchanan by Harold Hoffman.

== Plot ==
In the Year 2889

A nuclear war has wiped out most of Earth's population. The film follows a group of survivors who are holed up in a secluded valley and must protect themselves from rising radiation levels, mutants, and in some cases, each other.

== Cast ==
- Paul Petersen as Steve
- Quinn O'Hara as Jada
- Charla Doherty as Joanna Ramsey
- Neil Fletcher as Captain John Ramsey
- Hugh Feagin as Mickey Brown
- Max W. Anderson as Granger
- Bill Thurman as Tim Henderson
- Byron Lord as Mutant

== Production ==
AIP gave Buchanan the script of the 1955 Corman film Day the World Ended, originally written by Lou Rusoff, to use for this film, resulting in an almost line-for-line, scene-for-scene remake.

This was Buchanan's fifth Azalea Productions film. It was made by AIP six years after the success of their 1961 Jules Verne adaptation Master of the World. Because this was an even lower budget remake of the earlier low budget Corman film, it needed a new title; AIP already had a registered title available (for a previously unmade Verne project), so it was used on the Buchanan film.

== Release ==
In the Year 2889 was completed and released in 1967 as a made-for-television movie. All promotional materials, including the original listing in TV Guide, have the title as Year 2889, but the on-screen credits give the correct title.

AIP's 1950s special effects technician Paul Blaisdell, who handled the effects in the original AIP film Day the World Ended, happened to come across the film while channel surfing on a Saturday afternoon. He hadn't been told that all of his old AIP films had been remade in Color. He said "I recognized some of the dialogue coming out of the actors' mouths because it was a direct steal from Day the World Ended. I sat there...staring at it, and i just couldn't believe it. I was absolutely spellbound....It's just absolutely unbelievable that they (remade) those.... I don't want to know a damn thing about them. I hope I never see them. One was more than enough!"

=== Home media ===
In the Year 2889 was released on DVD by Retromedia Entertainment in 2004, packaged as a double feature with Buchanan's 1969 film 'It's Alive!'.

== Reception ==
Paul Gaita from Allmovie called the film "threadbare and blandly executed", but also noted that the film's pacing, and performances were more professional than the director's previous efforts. Finishing his review, Gaita wrote, "No one will mistake this for a classic of the genre, or even one of Corman's titles, but for Buchanan completists and late movie devotees, it's a harmless and agreeable time-killer."

== See also ==
- List of American films of 1967
- List of films in the public domain in the United States
