= In the Year 2889 =

In the Year 2889 may refer to:

- In the Year 2889 (film), a 1967 post-apocalyptic, made-for-television science fiction film directed by Larry Buchanan
- In the Year 2889 (short story), an 1889 short story published under the name of Jules Verne, but now believed to be mainly the work of his son Michel Verne
