= List of science fiction television programs, Z =

This is an inclusive list of science fiction television programs whose names begin with the letter Z.

== Z ==
Live-action

- Z Nation (2014-2018, US)
- Zack Files, The (2000–2002, Canada)
- Zombieland (2013, pilot)
- Zontar, The Thing from Venus a.k.a. Zontar: The Invader from Venus (1966, film)

Animated

- Zegapain (2006, Japan, animated)
- Zentrix (2003–2004, Hong Kong, animated)
- Zeta Project, The (2001–2002, animated)
- Zetman (2012, Japan, animated)
- Zevo-3 (2010–2011, animated)
- Zillion a.k.a. Red Photon Zillion (1987, Japan, animated)
- Zixx (2004–2009, Canada, partly animated)
- Zorro: Generation Z (2008–2009, Germany, animated)
