= Voodoo Woman =

1957 film by Edward L. Cahn

- film poster by Albert Kallis
- Directed by: Edward L. Cahn
- Written by: Russ Bender; V.I. Voss
- Produced by: Alex Gordon; Samuel Z. Arkoff; James H. Nicholson
- Starring: Marla English; Tom Conway; Mike Connors; Paul Blaisdell (as Monster)
- Cinematography: Frederick E. West
- Edited by: Ronald Sinclair
- Music by: Darrell Calker
- Production company: Carmel Productions
- Distributed by: American International Pictures
- Release date: February 14, 1957
- Running time: 75 minutes
- Country: United States
- Language: English
- Budget: $65,000

Voodoo Woman is a 1957 American horror film directed by Edward L. Cahn for Carmel Productions and starring Marla English in her final film role, Tom Conway, and Mike Connors. Paul Blaisdell created, and played, the monster in the film. It was released in February 1957 by American International Pictures as a double feature with The Undead.

It was remade by Larry Buchanan into a 1966 AIP made-for-television film titled Curse of the Swamp Creature.

== Plot ==
Harry West (Norman Willis) discovers gold in the idol worshipped by a jungle voodoo tribe in Bantalaya, a French-owned jungle colony. Harry enlists a pair of treasure hunters from the United States, one of them being the beautiful but ruthless Marilyn Blanchard (Marla English). Hoping to take the treasure for themselves, Marilyn murders Harry and steals his map. They con the innocent Ted Bronson (Mike Connors) into acting as a jungle guide and leading them to the tribe that owns the idol.

Meanwhile, Dr. Roland Gerard (Tom Conway), a mad scientist who has exiled himself deep in the same jungle, is using a combination of native voodoo and his own biochemical discoveries in an attempt to create a superhuman being. He hopes that this being, possessing the best of man and beast, will be the mother of a new perfect and deathless race which he will control with a mixture of hypnosis and telepathy. He is accompanied by his wife, Susan (Mary Ellen Kay), who no longer loves Dr. Gerard but is prevented from leaving by her husband and the natives.

Dr. Gerard's initial attempts to create a female superbeing are a failure because the transformation is only temporary and the native girl used as the subject of the experiment lacks the killer instinct he deems necessary to carryout his instructions. However, when he meets the treasure hunters, he decides that Marilyn would be a perfect subject for his experiment. He successfully turns her into an invulnerable monster, but when she learns her quest for gold was in vain, he loses his mental control over her and she destroys him. Ted and Susan are able to escape in the ensuing chaos. After becoming human again, Marilyn tries to salvage the idol which has almost fallen into a poisonous gas pit which the natives use for their sacrifices, and she accidentally loses her balance and falls into it herself, only to rise up out of it as the beast once again.

== Cast ==
- Marla English as Marilyn Blanchard, a treasure hunter
- Lance Fuller as Rick Brady, Marilyn's partner
- Tom Conway as mad scientist Dr. Roland Gerard
- Mary Ellen Kay as Susan Gerard, the doctor's wife
- Mike "Touch" Connors as Ted Bronson, a jungle guide
- Martin Wilkins as Chaka the witch doctor
- Paul Blaisdell as the Voodoo Women commanded by Dr. Gerard.
- Otis Greene as Bobo, the houseboy
- Emmett Smith as Gandor
- Jean Davis as Zaranda, an African girl
- Paul Dubov as Marcel Chateau, the bar owner
- Giselle D'Arc as Yvette, the singer at Marcel's bar
- Norman Willis as Harry West, businessman

== Production ==
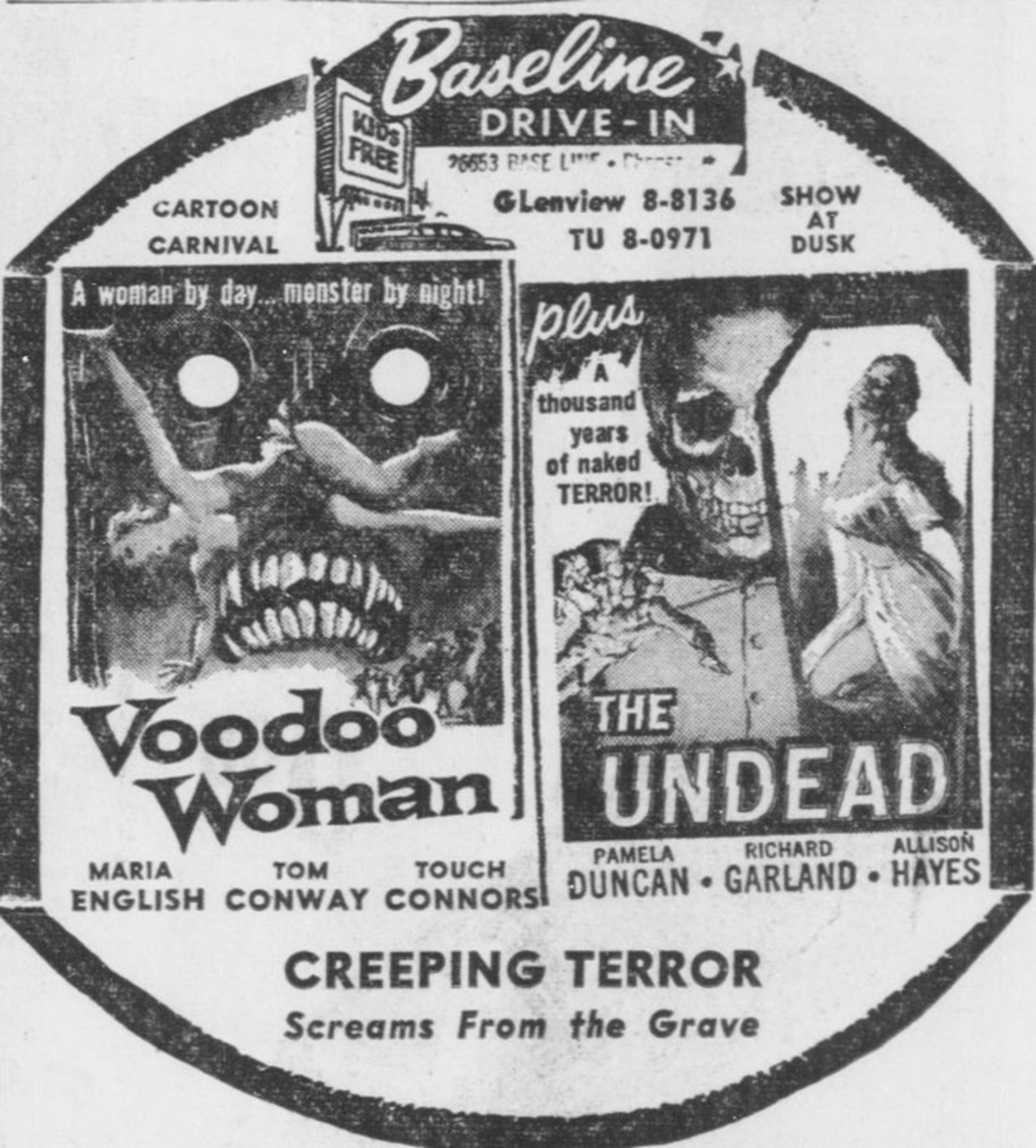
Drive-in advertisement from 1957 featuring Voodoo Woman with companion feature, The Undead.

Paul Blaisdell who played the monster and also appeared in a small role as a drunken customer in the bar room sequence believed that as producer Alex Gordon had a big hit with The She-Creature, he decided to produce a second film for American International Pictures about a female monster. As the scriptwriters of that film were busy on other films, Gordon turned over the writing to actor Russ Bender, who was a pre-war pulp fiction writer and V.I. Voss. (It wound up being the only script Bender would ever write.)

Blaisdell recalled the shoot was not a pleasant one. A prop man handed Tom Conway a small vial of real acid in one scene that was to be poured on the creature's leg, and Blaisdell wound up with a scar on his shin that lasted the rest of his life. Marla English developed a bad case of flu, and Lance Fuller and Mike Connors had a "Who can be taller?" contest with each actor adding higher lifts to their shoes.

Originally titled Black Voodoo, the film was shot during the frigid California winter of 1956-57 under a fast working schedule of six days and a budget of $80,000. Producer Alex Gordon wanted Peter Lorre who again refused to work with him and then called George Zucco, the star of Voodoo Man, who was too ill to work. With the shooting date drawing near, Tom Conway was chosen, who like Marla English and Paul Dubov, had also been in The She-Creature. Publicity for the film declared "Not since he starred in The Cat People and I Walked with a Zombie has Tom had a role like his current one!".

In an interview with Tom Weaver, Mike Connors said,

"I remember that they had set the jungle up on a stage, and you could only shoot about ten feet at a time. Then they'd move the camera and shoot ten feet going the other way, and then ten feet sideways and ten feet this way. It was kinda difficult to visualize what you were trying to put over, it was tough to see a jungle that was only ten feet by ten feet square and picture yourself deep in the heart of Africa!"

The original make-up design for the Voodoo Woman was deemed unsuitable at the last minute and the title monster is actually the She Creature costume hurriedly stripped of its tail, fins and pincer-like claws. What remained was the bulky Thing-style body, which was wrapped in a burlap sarong and topped with a modified skull mask and big blond wig. Cahn worked actively to conceal this fact, using quick cuts and keeping her mostly in shadows or behind foliage. The rumbling growl of a lion was also dubbed for added effect. Makeup man Harry Thomas supplied the skull mask and wig for the monster (purchased from a Halloween costume store), but it looked so phony, at the last minute, Blaisdell had to totally rework the head to make it look more acceptable.

Lance Fuller reportedly had a two-films-a-year deal over five years with Golden State Productions.

== Reception ==
Writing in AllMovie, critic Hal Erickson described the film as "more of a 'greed and revenge' melodrama than anything else," noting that it "is inevitable that Gerard will transform Marilyn into a monster, leading to a lively if barely credible finale."

In his The Pit and the Pen column in Fangoria magazine producer Alex Gordon revealed that the movie nearly caused a break-up with his then-fiance Ruth Alexander. Proud of the finished production he took her to see it at its Burbank premiere only to have her hand back his engagement ring when it was over, telling him that he should be making prestigious high class art films and not trash like this. Luckily, his brother Richard was able to explain to her the differences between low budget and big budget film-making, and she and Alex were eventually married, with her later actually scripting several of his features.

== Soundtrack ==
Darrell Calker composed scores for more than 200 movies, both live action and cartoons, where he was the musical director for Walter Lantz Productions.

Giselle D'Arc, born Giselle Camille Prugnard, was a soprano vocalist with a five-octave range. In addition to singing the title song in her role as a bargirl, she provided vocals for the film's score. Whilst she was singing for Liberty Records, she was discovered by Jeff Chandler who brought her into motion pictures. She later married Clint Walker.

Black Voodoo
Lyrics by John Blackburn
Music by Darrell Calker
Sung by Giselle D'Arc (a.k.a. Giselle Camille Prugnard Hennessy)

== See also ==
- List of American films of 1957
