= Common Law Wife (film) =

1963 American film

- Directed by: Larry Buchanan; Eric Sayers
- Written by: Grace Nolen
- Produced by: Fred A. Kadane
- Distributed by: Cinema Distributors of America; Texas Film Producers
- Release date: 1963
- Running time: 81 mins
- Country: United States
- Language: English

Common Law Wife is a 1963 American exploitation film shot in Texas.

== Plot ==
Shugfoot Rainey, a wealthy and elderly man, has been living with his girlfriend Linda for five years. Disgusted by her aging, he attempts to kick her out and replace her with his own niece, Baby Doll, a former stripper in New Orleans, despite it being incest.

== Cast ==
- Annabelle Weenick as Linda
- George Edgley as Shugfoot Rainey
- Lacey Kelly as Baby Doll
- Max W. Anderson

== Production ==
The film began as a movie called Swamp Rose made in 1960 by low-budget director Larry Buchanan. The existing footage was sold to producer Michael A. Rapps who hired Eric Sayers to shoot new footage and changed the title to Common Law Wife.

Buchanan later said the film began "as an artistically inclined, naturalistic romance, shooting in 16MM color around Caddo Lake. But the sleaze merchants got hold of it blew it up to 35MM in black and white, and changed the title... The delicacy of our photography was lost and so were any serious intentions we might have had for the film."

== Reception ==
In The Films of Larry Buchanan: A Critical Examination, Rob Craig points out, "Ripps and company decided to retain the main character from Buchanan's opus, but replace the actress who played her. Thus, the lead character in this disorienting backwoods fable changes indiscriminately from one person to another, in some cases quite obviously, lending the finished product a certain schizophrenic air. As one might imagine, Common Law Wife comes across as a choppy and confusing experience, which is not helped by the fact that a great deal of the footage seems to have been shot silent and overdubbed hastily afterwards."

Psychotronic Video wrote called it "similar in some ways to the rural dramas Russ Meyer was about to make, with good dialog (written in this case by a woman), but minus the comedy" and said Lacey Kelly "is great as the sarcastic, wild beauty who uses the (married) sheriff and “Bull” out in the swamp to get what she wants and plots murder. Linda fights back and the ending is outrageous! I liked all the twisting in the club too. Mike shadows are visible."

Tim Lucas of Video Watchdog said:

Sayers had nothing of Buchanan's ability, so Common Law Wife "crosses the line" like crazy, and the old and new footage cuts back-and-forth with absolutely no sense of rhythm - but as an example of what can sometimes happen to a film to make it "more commercial," it's a fascinating diversion for cinephiles. You see, Sayers was able to retain the services of some erstwhile cast members like Anne MacAdams and George Edgely, but Lacey Kelly was no longer available for reshoots. Therefore, the all-important role of "Baby Doll" is played in the final cut, with Buchanan's color footage dumbed-down to grainy black-and-white, by two completely different women. Ms. Kelly's unnamed replacement is disguised in some early shots with sunglasses and a series of preposterous hats, but it's ultimately a fact impossible to cover up.
