= Creature of Destruction =

- Written by: Enrique Touceda
- Directed by: Larry Buchanan
- Starring: Les Tremayne, Pat Delaney, Aron Kincaid
- Music by: Ronald Stein
- Country of origin: United States
- Original language: English

Production
- Producer: Larry Buchanan
- Cinematography: Robert C. Jessup
- Running time: 80 minutes
- Production company: Azalea Pictures
- Budget: Approx. $22,000

Original release
- Release: 1967

Creature of Destruction is a 1967 American made-for-television film produced and directed by Larry Buchanan. It is an uncredited color remake of the 1956 movie The She-Creature directed by Edward L. Cahn.

== Plot ==
Suave, silver-haired stage hypnotist and self-proclaimed clairvoyant and expert on reincarnation Dr. Basso's experiments in hypnotic regression take his beloved beautiful blonde assistant/unwilling test subject Doreena back to a prehistoric past life as an amphibious humanoid 'Gill Monster'.

Using the entranced Doreena to summon the physical manifestation of the hideous fish-faced creature out of the depths of a nearby lake, the tuxedo and top hat-clad Basso commands the savage she-beast to commit brutal murders. Partially for revenge on a world which scoffed at his strange occult theories and unshakable belief that mindlessly destructive primeval monsters still lurk hidden deep within all of us; but mostly for the notoriety they bring his performances when he predicts the killings before they happen.

While detective Blake suspects the misanthropic mentalist is behind these horrible crimes, the only real evidence the police have to go on is a webbed footprint found at the first crime scene and a sketch of the creature based on a description from an eyewitness who caught a glimpse of it after one of the murders, and they seem powerless to stop Basso's reign of terror.

Handsome young Air Force psychologist Captain Ted Dell, a respected scientist in the field of psychic research, gets involved in the case when his fiancée Lynn drags him to a party her father, retired business tycoon Sam Crane, is putting on for the rich guests at his Tanglewood Country Club and Resort where Basso is providing the entertainment. The cheerfully cynical Crane sees Basso as only another opportunity to con money out of a gullible public, but Ted becomes fascinated with the unhappy Doreena, the true source of Basso's paranormal power, and vows to free her from the unhealthy mental domination that the romantically obsessed Basso has her under.

With Ted's help, Doreena starts to gain the willpower to resist Basso, but not before the police confront the murderous million year old monstrosity down at a closed off beach, although their bullets have no effect on the indestructible creature. Angered at Ted's interference, Basso tries to kill him, but Doreena leaps in front of the gun and is shot instead, and her death causes the Gill Monster to fall to the ground and vanish back into the distant past. Heartbroken at losing the only person he has ever loved, Basso turns the gun on himself and commits suicide.

== Cast ==
- Les Tremayne as Dr. John Basso
- Pat Delaney as Doreena
- Aron Kincaid as Capt. Theodore Dell
- Neil Fletcher as Sam Crane
- Annabelle Weenick as Mrs. Crane
- Roger Ready as Lt. Blake
- Ron Scott
- Suzanne Roy as Lynn Crane
- Byron Lord as Investigating psychiatrist / The Creature
- Barnett Shaw as Investigating psychiatrist
- Scotty McKay as Singer

== Production ==
The film was one of a series of extremely low-budget 16 mm color remakes Larry Buchanan produced and directed for AIP (American International Pictures) via his Dallas-based Azalea Pictures and was shot entirely in and around the Tanglewood Lodge at Lake Texoma on the Texas-Oklahoma border.

Because of the movie's bargain basement budget, Buchanan could not afford anything as ornately bizarre and iconic as Paul Blaisdell's design for the original She Creature, so his Gill Monster costume, created by Dallas advertising executive turned makeup effects artist Jack Bennett, consisted of an ill-fitting and only slightly modified green rubber wetsuit and a cheap-looking fanged and finned, ping pong ball-eyed fish mask which Buchanan later reused as a briefly seen cave-dwelling dinosaur in his 1969 film 'It's Alive!'.

Aron Kincaid made the film as part of an out-of-court settlement with AIP. He filmed for two weeks to meet his contractual obligations then left to return home. Buchanan was upset as he still had three days of scenes for Kincaid to do. He accompanied him in the cab to the airport, taping the rest of his dialog in the back seat.

In addition to playing one of the She Creature's victims, Texas Rockabilly singer Scotty McKay (a.k.a. Max K. Lipscomb, 1939–1991) performed three songs in the movie including Here Comes Batman, his tribute to the popular TV series.

The quote that begins and ends most prints of the movie, "There is no monster in the world...so treacherous as man", is attributed to the 16th century French Renaissance writer Michel de Montaigne.

== Critical reception ==
Critic David Cornelius wrote in DVD Talk that the film was "an utterly bizarre and amusingly chintzy remake of the 1956 "The She-Creature" that would almost be interesting if not for Buchanan's directorial incompetence," described the creature as "a two dollar fish man costume with ping pong ball eyes," but noted that "Tremayne is the film's saving grace, in that he makes a handful of scenes tolerable with his restrained, classy presence." Writing in AllMovie, Cavett Binion described the film as an "enjoyably silly outing," adding that it was one of "Buchanan's many remakes of cheesy American International monster films, all of which made the originals seem positively brilliant by comparison."

== Merchandise ==
In 2014, the Japanese company Target Earth announced a Creature of Destruction vinyl action figure as part of their Hangyonin/Merman series along with figures for Horror of Party Beach and The Beach Girls and the Monster.

== See also ==
- List of American films of 1967
