= Naughty Dallas =

- Directed by: Larry Buchanan
- Written by: Larry Buchanan
- Produced by: Larry Buchanan
- Release date: 1964
- Country: United States
- Language: English

Naughty Dallas is a 1964 American film about a small town girl who arrives in Dallas determined to become a stripper. The movie was directed by Larry Buchanan.

It was claimed that this movie was partly shot in Jack Ruby's nightclub, but this has been discounted. There was also a rumour that Buchanan shot the footage of Jack Ruby.
