= Walter Maslow =

American actor (1928–2025)

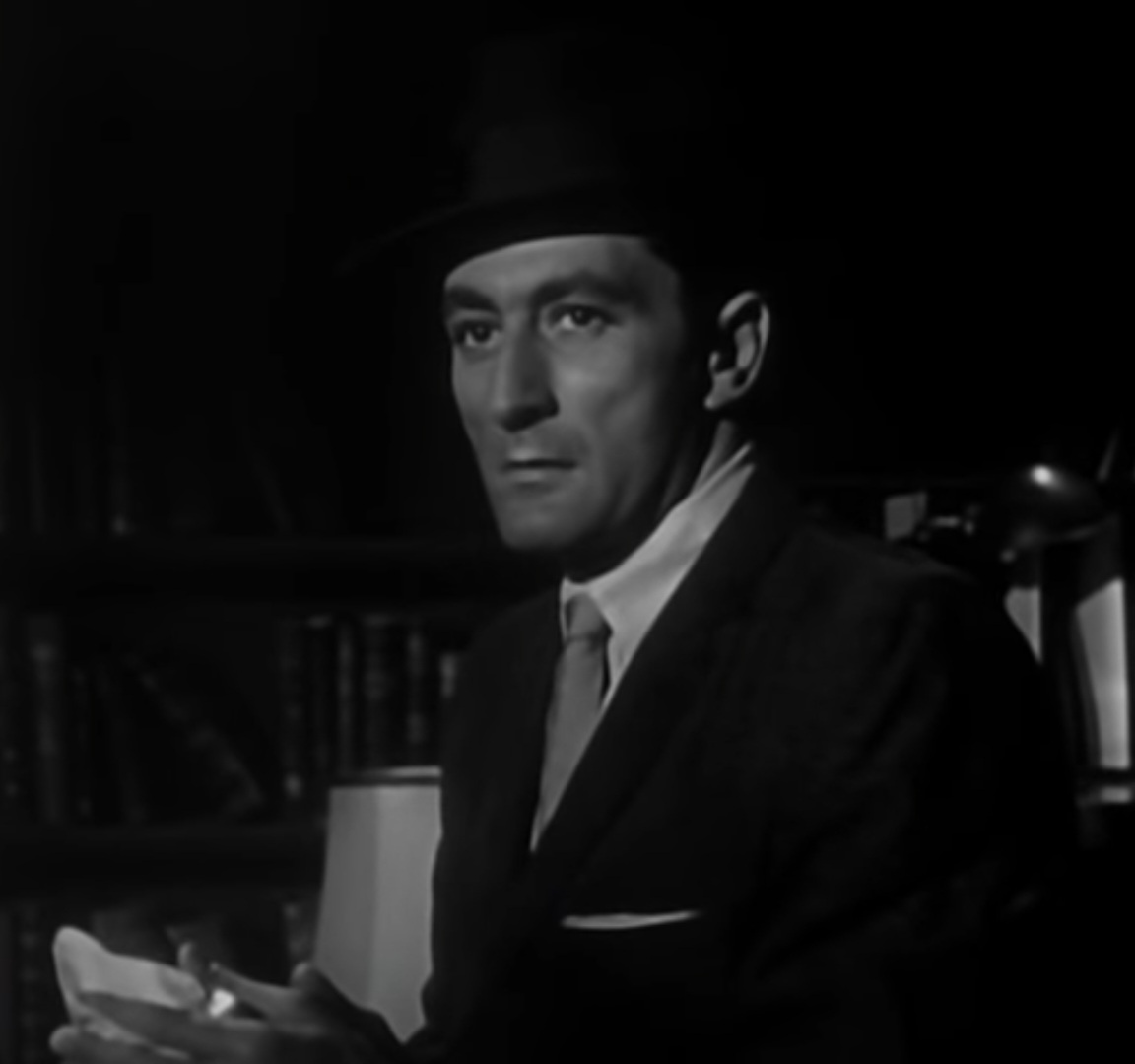
- Maslow in Man with a Camera, 1959
- Born: January 16, 1928; New York City, U.S.
- Died: November 2, 2025 (aged 97)
- Occupation: Actor
- Years active: 1956–1978

Walter Maslow (January 16, 1928 – November 2, 2025) was an American actor. He was known for playing Private Marty Green in the 1958 film Suicide Battalion.

== Early life and career ==
Maslow was born in Brooklyn, New York, on January 16, 1928, the son of Rubin and Sylvia Maslow. He served in the United States Navy during World War II. During his military service, he directed and acted on special services performances, which after his discharge, he moved to New York and appeared on off-Broadway productions at Cherry Lane Theatre in New York. He began his screen career in 1956, appearing in the CBS adventure and drama television series Crusader. The next year, he appeared in the film Under Fire, playing an uncredited role of a court officer.

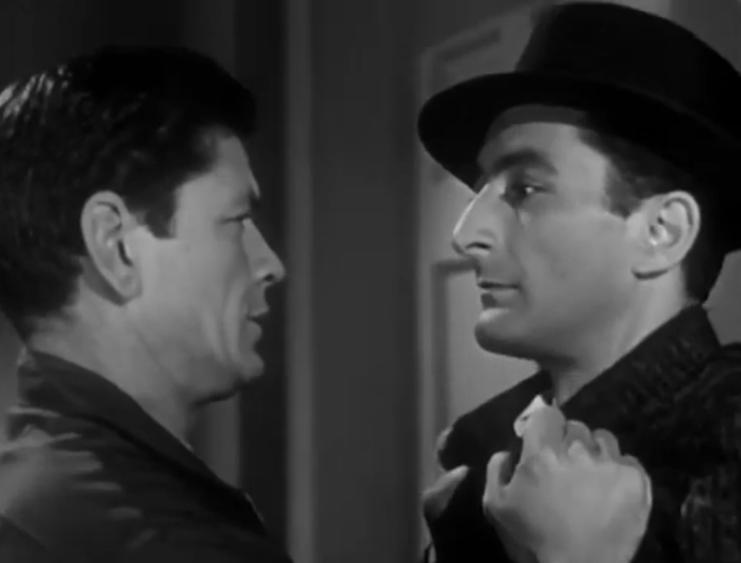
Maslow (right) with Charles Bronson in Man with a Camera (1959)

Later in his career, Maslow guest-starred in television programs including Johnny Staccato, 26 Men, Man with a Camera, Colt .45, Tales of Wells Fargo, Sky King, The Man from U.N.C.L.E., Fury, Iron Horse and Highway Patrol, and played the recurring roles of Dick Averill and Blackie Saunders in the ABC western television series The Life and Legend of Wyatt Earp. He also appeared in films such as Suicide Battalion (as private Marty Green), The Cosmic Man (as Dr. Ritchie), Atlas (as Garnis), Winter A-Go-Go, Warning Shot and Here Come the Jets.

Maslow retired from acting in 1978, last appearing in the film Malibu Beach.

== Personal life and death ==
In August 1951, Maslow married Eileen Wool in Los Angeles, California. She filed for divorce in April 1952, prevailing in May 1953.

On February 14, 1961, Maslow subsequently married Joan Young, an actress, in Rome, where he had completed his scenes for the film Francis of Assisi, and where the newlyweds would presently begin work in the film Barabbas, resulting in uncredited roles for each.

Maslow died on November 2, 2025, at the age of 97.
