= Aron Kincaid =

American actor (1940–2011)

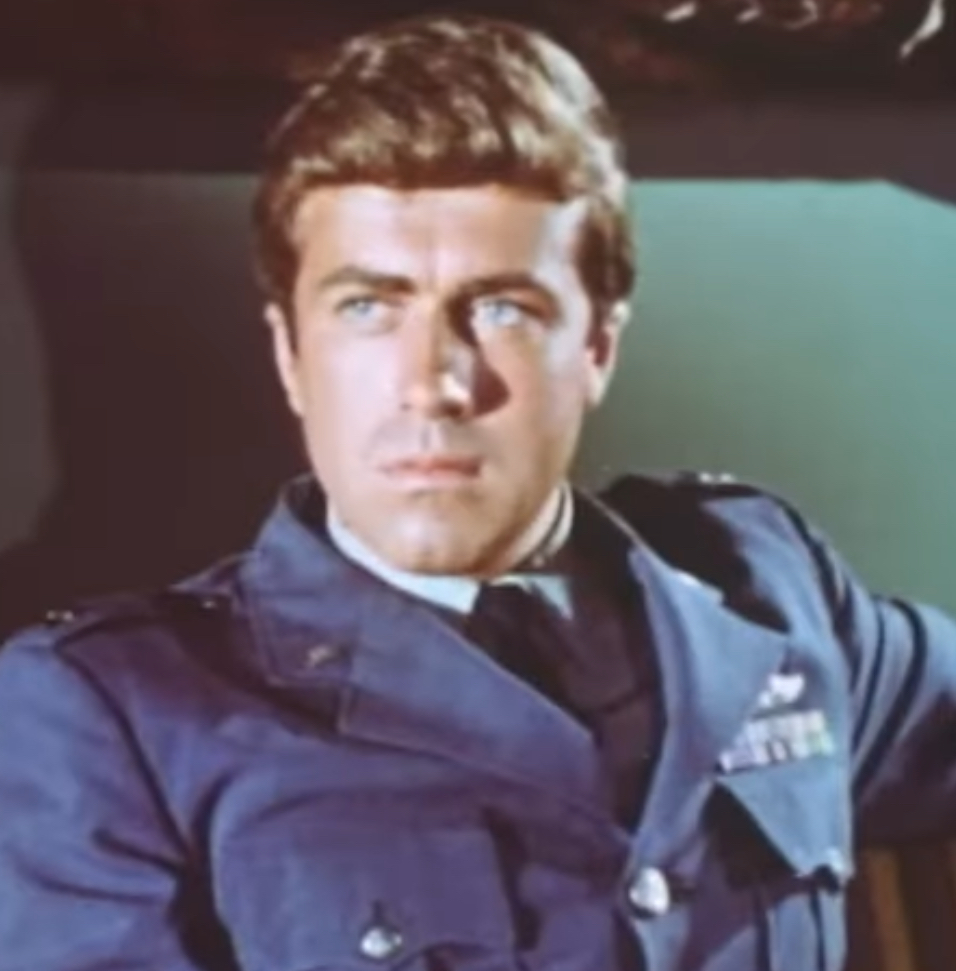
- Kincaid in Creature of Destruction (1967)
- Born: Norman Neale Williams II; June 15, 1940; Los Angeles, California, U.S.
- Died: January 6, 2011 (aged 70); Los Angeles, California, U.S.
- Occupation: Actor
- Years active: 1952–2002

Aron Kincaid (born Norman Neale Williams II; June 15, 1940 – January 6, 2011) was an American actor, known for voicing Killer Croc on Batman: The Animated Series and Sky Lynx on The Transformers. He also voiced characters for The Smurfs, and DuckTales, among others. In his later years he also had careers as a model and an artist.

== Early life ==
Kincaid graduated from Oakland High School. After graduation, he served in the United States Coast Guard reserve.

== Career ==
While attending UCLA, Kincaid was spotted in a local stage production by a casting agent and signed to a contract with Universal Pictures. Kincaid then landed a regular role in the final season of the television sitcom Bachelor Father (1962) as Warren Dawson, Bentley Gregg's junior partner and fiancé of Kelly, Gregg's niece.

Kincaid subsequently appeared with Noreen Corcoran in the 1965 comedy The Girls on the Beach and had roles in Beach Ball and Ski Party and made as a "guest appearance" in Dr. Goldfoot and the Bikini Machine. He was considered for the lead of The Graduate before director Mike Nichols chose Dustin Hoffman; Kincaid's agent turned down a cameo to play Elaine Robinson's (Katharine Ross) groom in the film.

His other film roles include the Disney musical The Happiest Millionaire, The Proud and the Damned and Silent Night, Deadly Night. He also made guest appearances on TV series such as The Beverly Hillbillies, Family Affair, and Get Smart. He moved to San Francisco in the early 1970s and launched a successful career as a model.

Still later, as an artist, Kincaid used the name N.N. Williams II. He sold his landscapes and seascapes through galleries in Laguna Beach, California.

== Death ==
Later in life, Kincaid came to live in Beverly Hills. He died at age 70 on January 6, 2011, at the Ronald Reagan UCLA Hospital from a heart-related condition.

== Selected filmography ==
=== Film ===
Year	Title	Role	Notes
1959	The Wasp Woman	Renfrew	Uncredited
1960	Spartacus	Standard-Bearer	Uncredited
1965	The Girls on the Beach	Wayne	
1965	Beach Ball	Jack	
1965	Ski Party	Freddie Carter	
1965	Dr. Goldfoot and the Bikini Machine	Motorist	
1966	The Ghost in the Invisible Bikini	Bobby	
1967	The Happiest Millionaire	Walter Blakely	
1972	The Proud and Damned	Ike	
1976	Gable and Lombard	Party Guest	
1976	Cannonball	David	
1984	Silent Night, Deadly Night	Obnoxious DJ	Uncredited
1986	The Golden Child	Informer	Uncredited

=== Television ===
Year	Title	Role	Notes
1965	The Wild Weird World of Dr. Goldfoot	Agent 00½	Television special
1966	The Patty Duke Show	Harold Wilson	Episode: "Do a Brother a Favor"
1967	Creature of Destruction	Theodore Dell	Television film
1968	Get Smart	Herb Talbot	Episode: "The Impossible Mission"
1980	Brave New World	J. Edgar Millhouse	Television film
1985–1986	Hulk Hogan's Rock 'n' Wrestling	The Iron Sheik (voice)	23 episodes
1986	The Flintstone Kids	Brad McBricker (voice)	2 episodes
1986–1987	The Transformers	Sky Lynx, Mark Morgan, Sweep (voice)	23 episodes
1987	DuckTales	Fritter O'Way (voice)	Episode: "Down and Out in Duckburg"
1992–1994	Batman: The Animated Series	Killer Croc, Lucas (voice)	6 episodes
1994	Teenage Mutant Ninja Turtles	Glaxon Captain (voice)	Episode: "Cyber Turtles"
1995	Freakazoid!	Nerdator (voice)	Episode: "Nerdator"
2002	The Zeta Project	Dad (voice)	Episode: "Eye of the Storm"
