= Charla Doherty =

American actress (1946–1988)

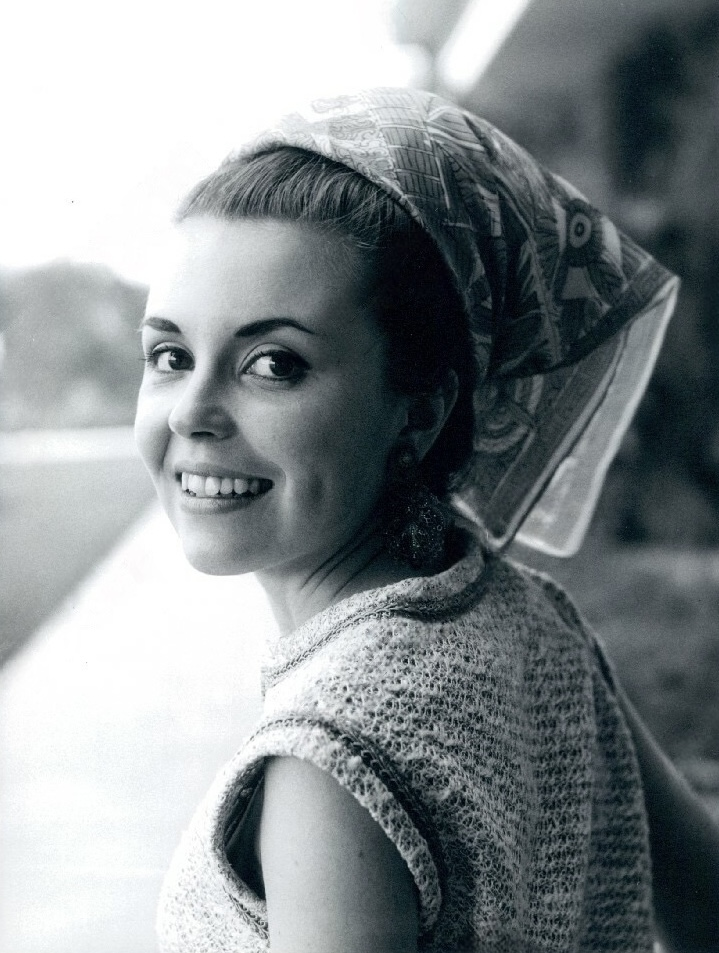
- Doherty in 1966
- Born: Charla Sue Doherty; August 6, 1946; Cleveland, Ohio, U.S.
- Died: May 29, 1988 (aged 41); Woodland Hills, California, U.S.
- Occupation: Actress
- Years active: 1962–1969
- Spouse: Malcolm Charles Lamont Black (m. 1967; div. 1982)
- Children: 1

Charla Sue Doherty (August 6, 1946 – May 29, 1988) was an American film and television actress who appeared on the first season of the long-running soap opera Days of Our Lives.

== Early years ==
Charla Sue Doherty was born in Cleveland, Ohio, the daughter of Charles Squires Doherty and Genevieve Recher Doherty. Seven months before her birth, Doherty's father won second prize in a contest seeking answers to the question "Why I hate Jack Benny...". The contest, sponsored by Benny's radio program, awarded $1500 to Charles Doherty, then a law student at Case Western Reserve University. The money was used to pay for costs associated with her birth. Much later, it provided a unique publicity angle for her appearance on The Jack Benny Program.

Her father moved the family in January 1948 to his home state of Nevada, where he practiced law in Reno. The family then relocated to her mother's hometown of Dayton, where Doherty attended Belmont Elementary School and started dance lessons. When she was nine, her family moved to Palos Verdes Estates, California, where she continued to study dance. Soon after the move to California, her parents took her to Del Mar Racetrack, where she found herself sitting next to Betty Grable. Doherty later said this was her favorite memory and the first time she wanted to become an actress herself.

Doherty entered Hollywood Professional School (HPS) as a sophomore during the 1960–1961 academic calendar. By her senior year (1962-1963) she was class treasurer and took afternoon courses at UCLA in world history and psychology through a cooperative program the two institutions had for high achieving HPS students. She graduated from HPS during June 1963. She later enrolled at UCLA and worked towards a Bachelors of Arts degree in History as her acting schedule allowed.

== Early career ==
While still a junior at HPS, Doherty acquired an agent and was listed in a major casting directory as available for ingénue parts. Her first television role came at age 15, on an episode of The Donna Reed Show. "The producer asked if I could dance-- when I told him I'd studied for six years, I got the job. I sure was surprised when the dancing turned out to be a Twist with Paul Petersen!"

Following her small screen debut, Doherty appeared in one-time guest roles on episodes of three more television series, before landing a supporting role on Claudia. This project by Fox's TV division never made it on the air, but did bring Doherty to the attention of Fox film producers, who cast her in Take Her, She's Mine. Doherty's agent used the resulting publicity to push the story about her father winning the Jack Benny contest, which led to her appearing on that program nine months later in April 1964.

Despite her agent's campaign, Doherty switched her personal representation from the Hy Sieger Agency to Contemporary Artists Ltd. Doherty did episodes of eleven prime time television series during 1964–1965, before landing a recurring role on a daytime soap opera. Her journeyman status as an actress is reflected in that only one show, Wagon Train, used her on more than one episode. Veteran actors at this period in television were more typically signed for two different roles during the course of a season. Her second film, Village of the Giants (1965), was lightly regarded by critics and did not bring her much individual publicity.

== Days of Our Lives ==
Doherty originated the role of Julie Olson on the soap opera Days of Our Lives. She played the troubled teen from the show's first episode on November 8, 1965 until November 21, 1966, appearing on 51 episodes during that year and two weeks. The character then disappeared from the show's storyline until spring 1967 when it was recast with actress Kathy Dunn. The circumstances leading to the recasting are not known.

== Later career ==
An episode of The Guns of Will Sonnett, filmed during summer 1967 was her last credited television series work. She played the role of Joanna Ramsey in a made-for-television movie In the Year 2889, released in late 1969 but which may have been produced earlier.

Doherty's first known stage work came in January 1968, when a combined cast of eight professional and eight amateur actors performed Life with Father in Santa Barbara, California. The show was a project initiated by the local high school's drama teacher and students, who collected money for the insurance bond, and persuaded Actor's Equity to grant permission for pros to perform on the same stage with amateurs. Besides Doherty, the pros for the one week run included Leon Ames and Lurene Tuttle as the leads, while her then husband Malcolm Black was the director.

Malcolm Black was also the director for Doherty's next stage work, an eight week run of A Midsummer Night's Dream, produced by the Inner City Repertory (ICR) company in Los Angeles. Doherty played Hermia, in a cast that included Kim Hamilton, Dana Elcar, Bonnie Bedelia, Mark Lenard, Don Pedro Colley, and Robert Ito. The production at the Cultural Center Playhouse was well-received by critics

== Personal life ==
At age 17, Doherty was reported to be five feet tall, weigh 89 pounds, and her IQ was reported as 183 by a newspaper columnist. She drove a burgundy-colored Ford Mustang in 1966, used three alarm clocks to wake up, and usually lunched on tomato soup and cottage cheese.

Doherty married stage director Malcolm C. Black in San Diego on June 2, 1967. He was 18 years her senior, had emigrated to the US from the UK as a child, and became a U.S. citizen in 1965. They had a son, Trevor Black. The couple divorced in Los Angeles on March 1, 1982.

== Obituary discrepancies ==
Upon her death on May 29, 1988, at age 41, there were two informants from whom obituary articles across the nation drew. One was her publicist, Michael Druxman, whose information was picked up by the Associated Press (AP) and copied across the country. This obituary version carried the dateline of "Calabasas, Calif (AP)" and stated she had died at her own home there. It contained two minor inaccuracies about Doherty's career, concerning her length of time on Days of Our Lives and that she appeared on the Mannix TV series.

The other informant reported to the Los Angeles Times that Doherty had died at her mother's house in nearby Woodland Hills. This obituary had several minor inaccuracies about Doherty's career, concerning her length of time on Days of Our Lives, the number of movies she made, and that she appeared on the Ben Casey TV series. This version of the obituary was also picked up by other newspapers, with the inserted dateline of "Hollywood" and credited to the Los Angeles Times.

Both informants agreed that she died of natural causes and that her survivors were her mother and son.

== Filmography ==
Film (by year of first release)
Year	Title	Role	Notes
1963	Take Her, She's Mine	Lisa Michaelson	Her first film role, in which she plays Jimmy Stewart's younger daughter
1965	Village of the Giants	Nancy	

Television (in original broadcast order)
Year	Series	Episode	Role	Notes
1962	The Donna Reed Show	The Golden Trap	Janice	At age 15, her first credited TV role
1962	Mister Ed	Ed, the Matchmaker	Gloria	
1962	Going My Way	A Matter of Principle	Harriet Hall	
1963	Leave It to Beaver	Don Juan Beaver	Melinda Neilson	At age 16, Charla played an eighth-grader
1963	The Donna Reed Show	The Boys in 309	Cheerleader	Newspaper photo for this episode identified her by name
1964	Arrest and Trial	Funny Man with a Monkey	Laurie	
1964	The Jack Benny Program	Harlow Gets a Date	Judy Weber	Charla gets to thank the man who paid for her birth
1964	Wagon Train	The Hide Hunters	Samantha Follett	
1964	Mickey	Honest Injun	White Fawn	Charla plays a Native American trying to reclaim land
1964	My Three Sons	First, You're a Tadpole	Ellen	
1965	Branded	Coward Step Aside	Karin - Clay's Gal	Charla plays Johnny Crawford's girl friend
1965	Kraft Suspense Theatre	Won't It Ever Be Morning?	Shirley Rankin	Charla plays a 15 year old murder victim
1965	Wagon Train	The Indian Girl Story	Patty McNeil	
1965	Mister Roberts	Bookser's Honeymoon	Suzette	Tim Rooney sneaks his island native bride (Charla) aboard ship for their honeymoon
1965	Days of Our Lives	(13 Episodes)	Julie Olson	Charla's only recurring role in a TV series
1965	Gidget	The War Between Men, Women, and Gidget	Darcy	
1965	Dr. Kildare	Perfect Is Too Hard to Be	Kathy Calvert	
1966	Days of Our Lives	(38 Episodes)	Julie Olson	Charla's role lasted thru November
1967	The Guns of Will Sonnett	The Natural Way	Ellie Wilson	
1969	In the Year 2889	(TV Movie)	Joanna Ramsey	Her last screen appearance, like her first, co-starred Paul Petersen
