= The Other Side of Bonnie and Clyde =

- Directed by: Larry Buchanan
- Written by: Larry Buchanan
- Produced by: Larry Buchanan
- Narrated by: Burl Ives
- Release date: 1968
- Country: United States
- Language: English

The Other Side of Bonnie and Clyde is a 1968 docudrama film directed and produced by Larry Buchanan.
