= The Naked Witch =

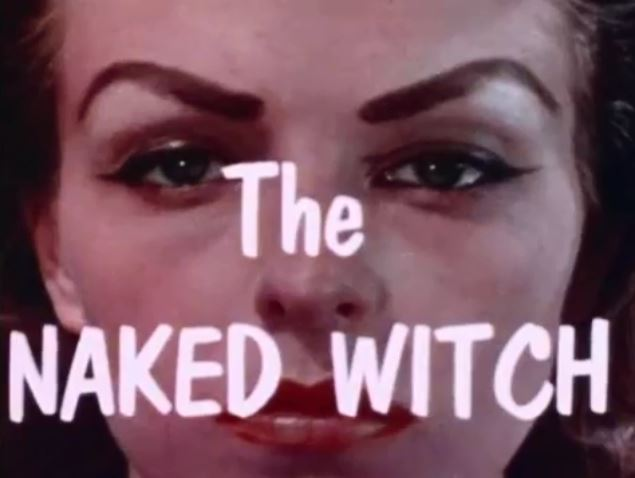
- Title card
- Directed by: Larry Buchanan; Claude Alexander
- Written by: Larry Buchanan; Claude Alexander
- Produced by: Larry Buchanan
- Starring: Libby Hall; Robert Short; Jo Maryman
- Narrated by: Gary Owens (uncredited)
- Cinematography: Larry Buchanan
- Edited by: Larry Buchanan; Claude Alexander
- Music by: Ray Plagens
- Production company: Alexander Enterprises
- Distributed by: Alexander Enterprises
- Release date: 1964
- Running time: 57 minutes
- Country: United States
- Language: English
- Budget: $8,000
- Box office: $80,000

The Naked Witch is a 1964 American horror film produced by Claude Alexander, and written and directed by Larry Buchanan. It stars Libby Hall, Robert Short and Jo Maryman. The film was shot in 1960 and has a copyright date of 1961 but was not released until 1964. It tells the story of a university student who travels to Texas, where he inadvertently restores a dead witch to life. She then takes revenge on the Schöennig family, one of whom, her lover, had denounced her a century earlier. The student falls under the spell of the witch but recovers in time to save Kirska, the only remaining Schöennig, before he himself kills the witch again.

The Naked Witch was financed by a Texan drive-in theater owner who wanted a movie with much nudity, but the actual amount of nudity is negligible. The film was considered to be a success, bringing in box office receipts of $80,000 and helping to launch Buchanan's career.

It is often confused with another regional-made film, also titled The Naked Witch (aka The Naked Temptress), a lost film directed by Andy Milligan in New Jersey in 1967.

== Plot ==
A university student is researching his thesis on the "thoroughly German" villages of modern-day central Texas. He's on his way to Luckenbach - where people speak German more often than English - when his car runs out of gas. He walks into town and meets Kirska Schöennig, who takes him to the hotel run by her grandfather, Hans. While none of the older residents of the town will talk to the student about the "Luckenbach Witch," Kirska loans him a book about her.

Learning from the book that the witch is buried near the inn, the student goes to the cemetery and opens her shallow grave by hand. He removes from her mummified remains the spike that was driven through her. After he returns in haste to the inn, she rises naked from her grave, quite intact and intent on taking revenge on the Schöennigs, the descendants of her lover, the married man who denounced her as a witch a century earlier.

The witch steals the stake and goes to Kirska's bedroom, where she steals Kirska's nightgown before setting out in search of the other two remaining Schöennigs, Hans and Franz. She quickly dispatches them both. The student finds the witch bathing nude in a creek and falls under her spell. But after spending the night with her, he snaps out of it and decides that it is his responsibility to stop her.

As the witch magically summons Kirska to the graveyard, the student rushes in and struggles with the witch. She falls upon the stake, dead again.

== Cast ==
- Libby Hall as the Naked Witch
- Robert Short as the Student
- Jo Maryman as Kirska Schöennig
- Denis Adams as Otto Schöennig
- Charles West as Hans Schöennig
- Howard Ware as Franz the Miller
- Jack Herman as The Elder
- Marilyn Pope as The Librarian
- Der Saengerbund Children's Choir
- Rae Forbes (uncredited) as Villager
- Gary Owens (uncredited) as Prologue narrator

== Production ==
The Naked Witch was shot in Luckenbach, Texas on a budget of $8,000. It falls into film critic Brian Albright's category of a regional film as one that is "(a) filmed outside the general professional and geographical confines of Hollywood; (b) produced independently; and (c) made with a cast and crew made up primarily of residents of the states in which the film was shot."

The film begins not with the first scene of the plot, but rather with a "lengthy narration about the history of witchcraft," dramatically voiced over by an uncredited Gary Owens.

== Distribution ==
According to undated film posters, The Naked Witch was produced and distributed by Alexander Enterprises as "an Adult picture." An advertisement, also without a date, shows the film as the second feature on an R-rated double-bill with The Legend of Witch Hollow (1969) (aka The Witchmaker, The Witchmaster and Witchkill).

Although filmed in color, black-and-white prints of The Naked Witch were distributed to some theaters in 1964. For home viewing, Sinister Cinema released a black-and-white video, although without the complete footage. A full-color version dubbed from the 35mm original print was released by Something Weird Video.

== Reception ==
Academic film scholar Heather Greene writes that the film was part of the "growing sexploitation or 'nudie' industry" when it was made. However, the greater significance of The Naked Witch is that it is "the first to use the resurrected witch narrative and the ghost horror witch." In the years after the film, "the resurrected witch theme becomes increasingly popular and eventually dominates witch films by the early 2000s (e.g., The Blair Witch Project, 1999)."

== See also ==
- List of films about witchcraft
