= Suicide Battalion =

1958 film by Edward L. Cahn

- Original film poster by Albert Kallis
- Directed by: Edward L. Cahn
- Written by: Lou Rusoff
- Based on: story by Rusoff
- Produced by: Lou Rusoff executive Samuel Z. Arkoff; James H. Nicholson
- Starring: Mike Connors; John Ashley; Russ Bender; Bing Russell; Walter Maslow; Robert Tetrick
- Cinematography: Floyd Crosby
- Edited by: Robert S. Eisen
- Music by: Ronald Stein
- Production company: Zuma Productions
- Distributed by: AIP (US); Anglo-Amalgamated (UK)
- Release date: February 28, 1958 (US)
- Running time: 79 minutes
- Country: United States
- Language: English
- Budget: $100,000 est.

Suicide Battalion is a 1958 World War II film directed by Edward L. Cahn and starring Mike Connors, John Ashley (who made the film while on leave from the United States Army), Russ Bender, Bing Russell, Walter Maslow and Robert Tetrick. In 1968, it was remade for television by Larry Buchanan as Hell Raiders, which was the film's original working title.

American International Pictures originally released it as a double feature with Jet Attack.

== Plot ==
The story takes place during World War II in the Philippines. A group of American soldiers is recruited for a dangerous mission to destroy an enemy base and keep strategic documents out of the reach of the invading Imperial Japanese Army.

== Cast ==
- Mike Connors as Major Matt McCormack
- John Ashley as Pvt. Tommy Novello
- Jewell Lain as Elizabeth Ann Mason
- Russ Bender as Sgt. Harry Donovan
- Bing Russell as Lt. Chet Hall
- Scott Peters as Pvt. Wally Zagorsky
- Walter Maslow as Pvt. Marty Green
- John McNamara as Colonel Craig
- Clifford Kawada as Colonel Hiosho
- Robert Tetrick as Pvt Bill
- Marjorie Stapp as Beverly
- Jan Englund as Annette
- Isabel Cooley as Julie
- Hilo Hattie as Mama Lily
- Sammee Tong as Papa Lily
- Art Gilmore as Captain Hendry
- Jackie Joseph as Cho-Cho

== Production ==
The film was an original story by Lou Rusoff reportedly based on the capture of General William Dean during the Korean War. It was announced for production in November 1955 as Hell Raiders. It was to star Lance Fuller who had made Apache Woman for producer Alex Gordon and had signed a ten-film deal with AIP (or ARC as it was then known), to make two films a year for five years. Filming was to begin January 1956.

Filming was pushed back and Fuller did not make the movie. In April 1956 AIP announced that Richard Denning would star and that Edward L. Cahn would direct. Denning ended up not appearing in the film either, which was not made until late 1957.

Filming began on 12 November 1957. Star John Ashley was doing a six-month stint in the army at the time. The producers got him an early release to make the movie. Ashley later had a noted association with filmmaking in the Philippines.

== Reception ==
Variety called it "well produced".

"A very poor man's half-Naked half-dead," wrote the Los Angeles Times. "The good basic idea is hopelessly messed up with tritisms." Jackie Joseph called it "this B minus war movie."

== See also ==
- List of American films of 1958
