= Onyx Cave (Arkansas) =

Flowstone cave in Arkansas, United States

Coordinates: 36.44121°N 93.68425°W

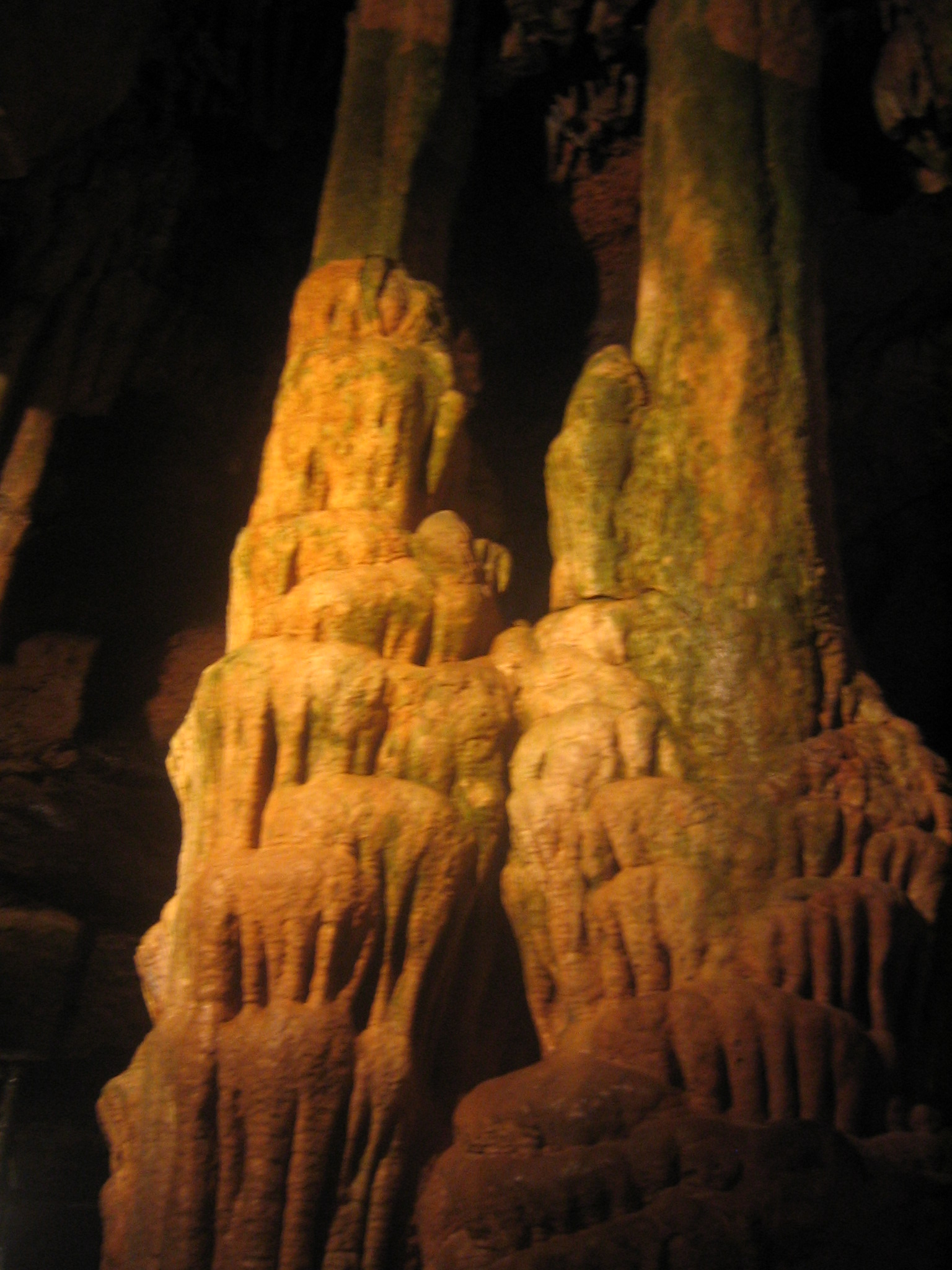
Cave formation inside Onyx Cave

Onyx Cave is a small show cave located about 6 miles (9.7 km) east of Eureka Springs, Arkansas. It has been a tourist attraction since 1893, making it the oldest show cave in Arkansas. The cave does not contain onyx, but rather flowstone, also known as "cave onyx". During the 19th century and the beginning of the 20th century many such caves were named similarly.

Visitors are guided through the cave by audio head sets which inform them about chambers and rock formations. Since the cave has only one public opening, visitors exit the cave the way they entered. The cave stays at an average temperature of 57 °F (14 °C) year round.

In 1969, some scenes from the B-movie 'It's Alive' were filmed at Onyx Cave.

In October 2017 the cave and surrounding acreage were put for sale for $500,000.
