= Zontar, the Thing from Venus =

1967 American television film by Larry Buchanan

- DVD cover
- Genre: Horror; Sci-fi
- Written by: Lou Rusoff; Larry Buchanan; Hillman Taylor
- Directed by: Larry Buchanan
- Starring: John Agar; Susan Bjurman; Anthony Huston; Patricia De Laney
- Music by: Ronald Stein (uncredited)
- Country of origin: United States
- Original language: English

Production
- Cinematography: Robert B. Alcott
- Running time: 80 minutes
- Production company: Azalea Pictures
- Budget: $22,000

Original release
- Release: December 1967

Zontar, the Thing from Venus (also known as Zontar: The Invader from Venus) is a 1967 American made-for-television horror science fiction film directed by Larry Buchanan and starring John Agar and Susan Bjurman. It is based on the teleplay by Hillman Taylor and Buchanan. It is a low-budget 16 mm color remake of Roger Corman's It Conquered the World (1956), which also featured an alien invader from Venus. The movie was filmed around White Rock Lake area in Dallas, Texas. The main house featured is a home in Lochwood neighborhood by White Rock Lake on corner of Rogue Way.

== Plot ==
Zontar, the Thing from Venus

At a dinner party with their wives, NASA scientist Dr. Keith Ritchie reveals to his colleague Dr. Curt Taylor that he has secretly been in communication with an alien from Venus named Zontar who he claims is coming to Earth to solve all of the world's problems. However, as soon as Zontar arrives on Earth via a fallen laser satellite it quickly becomes obvious that the three-eyed, bat-winged, skeletal black creature has a hidden agenda, as it begins causing local power outages that stop telephones, automobiles and even running water from working, and it starts taking control of people's minds using flying lobster-like "injecto-pods" that sprout from its wings. Only after his wife is killed does Ritchie finally realize that Zontar has come not as a savior but as a conqueror, and he goes to confront the hideous alien in the sulfur spring-heated cave that it has made its secret base.

== Cast ==
- John Agar as Dr. Curt Taylor
- Susan Bjurman as Ann Taylor
- Anthony Huston as Keith Ritchie
- Patricia De Laney as Martha Ritchie
- Neil Fletcher as Gen. Matt Young
- Warren Hammack as John
- Colleen Carr as Louise
- Jeff Alexander as rocket scientist
- Bill Thurman as Police Chief Brad Crenshaw
- Andrew Traister as Sgt. Magalari
- Jonathan Ledford as gate guard
- George Edglley as Mr. Ledford
- Carol Gilley as Alice
- Bertha Holmes as townswoman

== Reception ==
In a review for AllMovie, Paul Gaita wrote "For experienced cult movie watchers, Zontar is the cinematic equivalent of a car accident, an unpleasant spectacle from which one cannot look away".

According to Greg Goodsell, writing in Filmfax magazine, Zontar, the Thing from Venus is arguably Buchanan's best known film.

From 1981–1992 Zontar, the Magazine from Venus was published in Boston. It included an interview with Buchanan by Ivan Stang.

Creature Feature gave the movie one star, stating it was so inept that only fans of "so bad it's good" films would enjoy it.

TV Guide states that while the movie is not good, it is not as bad as its reputation suggests.

== In popular culture ==
Zontar was famously spoofed by SCTV in the Season 4, Cycle 2, Episode 3 sequence "Zontar", originally broadcast October 30, 1981.

== See also ==
- List of American films of 1967
- List of films featuring extraterrestrials
