= Hell Raiders =

1969 television film by Larry Buchanan

- Genre: Drama; War
- Written by: Larry Buchanan
- Directed by: Larry Buchanan
- Starring: John Agar; Richard Webb; Joan Huntington
- Country of origin: United States
- Original language: English

Production
- Producer: Larry Buchanan
- Running time: 80 minutes
- Production company: Azalea Pictures

Original release
- Release: June 1969

Hell Raiders is a 1969 American made-for-television war film directed by Larry Buchanan. It was one of several movies he made for AIP that were remakes of earlier AIP movies – in this case, Suicide Battalion (1958).
