= High Yellow =

- Directed by: Larry Buchanan
- Written by: Larry Buchanan
- Based on: Erskine William's Diary of a Negro Maid
- Produced by: Larry Buchanan
- Starring: Cynthia Hull; Warren Hammack; Kay Taylor; Bill McGhee; Anne MacAdams
- Distributed by: Thunder Pictures
- Release date: August 4, 1965
- Running time: 83 minutes
- Country: United States
- Language: English

High Yellow is a 1965 film written and directed by Larry Buchanan. Its story concerns a black girl who tries to pass for white.

== Plot ==
Cynthia Wood is a 17-year-old, light-skinned black girl. She tries to pass as white after being hired by wealthy movie magnate, Mr. Langley.
