= Invasion of the Saucer Men =

1957 American film by Edward L. Cahn

- Theatrical release poster by Albert Kallis
- Directed by: Edward L. Cahn
- Written by: Robert J. Gurney Jr. Al Martin
- Based on: "The Cosmic Frame" by Paul W. Fairman
- Produced by: Robert J. Gurney Jr. James H. Nicholson; Samuel Z. Arkoff
- Starring: Stephen Terrell; Gloria Castillo; Frank Gorshin; Raymond Hatton; Lyn Osborn
- Cinematography: Frederick E. West
- Edited by: Charles Gross; Ronald Sinclair
- Music by: Ronald Stein
- Production company: Malibu Productions
- Distributed by: American International Pictures
- Release date: June 19, 1957
- Running time: 69 minutes
- Country: United States
- Language: English

Invasion of the Saucer Men (U.K. title: Invasion of the Hell Creatures; working title: Spacemen Saturday Night), is a 1957 black-and-white comic science fiction/comedy horror film produced by James H. Nicholson for release by American International Pictures. The film was directed by Edward L. Cahn and stars Stephen Terrell, Gloria Castillo, Raymond Hatton, and Frank Gorshin. The alien costumes were designed by Paul Blaisdell, who played one of the creatures in the film, along with dwarf actor Angelo Rossitto and Blaisdell's friend Bob Burns III. Special effects were handled by Howard A. Anderson and Alex Weldon, and Don Ament was Art Director.

The screenplay by Robert J. Gurney Jr. and Al Martin was based on the 1955 short story "The Cosmic Frame" by Paul W. Fairman. Invasion of the Saucer Men was released as a double feature with I Was a Teenage Werewolf (1957).

== Plot ==
A flying saucer lands in the woods. A teenage couple, Johnny Carter and Joan Hayden, while driving to their local lover's lane without the headlights on, accidentally run down one of the little green men from the saucer.

Joe Gruen, a drunken con man, stumbles across the alien's corpse after the teenagers have left to report the incident. Imagining future riches and fame, he plans to keep the body stored for now in his refrigerator. After failing to convince his friend Art Burns to help him retrieve the alien body, Joe decides to return to the scene. Other aliens soon arrive, however, and quickly inject alcohol into his veins via their retractable needle fingernails. Joe, who was already intoxicated, dies from alcohol poisoning. The aliens remove their dead companion from the scene, and replace it with Joe's corpse.

Having reported the accident and the deceased alien to the police, Johnny and Joan return with the sheriff, only to find Joe's dead body at the scene of the accident instead of the alien's. The police then decide to charge Johnny with vehicular manslaughter. (The aliens have in a sense "framed" Johnny, hence the title of the short story the film was based on).

Meanwhile, the dead alien's hand has detached itself from its arm and runs amok in the woods, causing trouble. The military, following up an earlier UFO report, soon get involved, eventually surrounding the alien's saucer and accidentally blowing it to smithereens.

Art goes to the accident scene with the teenagers, where he also gets injected numerous times with alcohol by the aliens, but he doesn't die because he wasn't already intoxicated at the time. In the end, it is the teenagers, not the military, who defeat the aliens when they discover that the saucer's occupants cannot stand the glare from their car's bright headlights. When the teenagers all flash their headlights on them at once, the three remaining aliens disappear in a puff of smoke.

== Cast ==
- Stephen Terrell as Johnny Carter
- Gloria Castillo as Joan Hayden
- Frank Gorshin as Joe Gruen
- Lyn Osborn as Artie Burns
- Raymond Hatton as Farmer Larkin
- Sam Buffington as Colonel Ambrose
- Douglas Henderson as Lt. Wilkins
- Kelly Thordsen as Sgt. Bruce
- Ed Nelson as boy
- Russ Bender as doctor
- Bob Einer as soda jerk
- Paul Blaisdell as alien
- Bob Burns III as alien
- Angelo Rossitto as alien
- Eddie Gibbons as alien
- Dean Neville as alien
- Lloyd Dixon as alien

== Production ==
The film was made by Malibu Productions. Film rights to Fairman's short story The Cosmic Frame were purchased through Forrest J Ackerman's Ackerman Science Fiction Agency. Special effects technician Paul Blaisdell, who provided four alien costumes, a mobile severed hand and a flying saucer, recalled that Invasion of the Saucer Men was originally intended as a serious horror film, but gradually developed into a comedy. Blaisdell and his friend/assistant Bob Burns played two of the aliens, with the others being played alternately by dwarf actors Angelo Rossito, Eddie Gibbons, Dean Neville and Lloyd Dixon.

The entire film takes place during the period of one night, with 98% of it filmed on a very large studio sound stage. Blaisdell felt that Frederick West's excellent "day-for-night" photography added a lot to the clarity of the film's picture quality. Blaisdell praised Ronald Stein's silly symphonic music score and actor Lyn Osborn's rubbery, emotional facial expressions with setting the perfect mood for the film. (Lyn Osborn previously had starred as "Cadet Happy" on TV's Space Patrol in the mid-1950s; he died soon after completing his work on Saucer Men.

== Release ==
Invasion of the Saucer Men was released by AIP on June 19, 1957 as part of a double feature with I Was a Teenage Werewolf.

== Legacy ==
In 1965, self-professed "schlockmeister" Larry Buchanan cheaply remade Invasion of the Saucer Men in color as The Eye Creatures, a made-for-television feature for AIP-TV.

The Lillingtons featured a song called "Invasion of the Saucermen" on their 1999 album Death by Television.

== Reception ==
Variety called the film "a minor entry for the science-fiction trade", noting that it "suffers from poor use of attempted comedy, and is further handicapped by a haphazard sort of yarn which makes film's 69-minutes' running time seem much more".

Harrison's Reports called it "an ordinary program melodrama...The action on the whole is rather unbelievable, but it does have its horrific moments, particularly in the scenes where severed hands are shown creeping about to touch human beings".

In the U.K. (where the film was released under the title Invasion of the Hell Creatures), The Monthly Film Bulletin wrote: "The moments of burlesque of horror melodrama traditions, whether intentional or not, are at least curious. The trickeries are quite convincingly staged, but the film is juvenile in approach and treatment".

On his website Fantastic Movie Musings and Ramblings, Dave Sindelar gave the film a mixed review, saying, "Though it maintains a light atmosphere, it is very lacking in the basic element of a comedy, and that's good jokes. Nonetheless, it's directed with a certain energy, features some truly memorable aliens courtesy of Paul Blaisdell, juggles its three storylines with ease, and in its own way, it may be THE quintessential aliens vs. teenagers movie".

Hans J. Wollstein from AllMovie gave the film a negative review, calling it "claustrophobic at best" and stating that the film "simply isn't funny but is clearly meant to be".

== Cultural references ==
The film was referred to in "Place of Dreams", a short story by writer John Roman Baker from his book Brighton Darkness.
