= Free, White and 21 =

1963 film by Larry Buchanan

- Directed by: Larry Buchanan
- Written by: Larry Buchanan; Harold Dwain; Cliff Pope
- Produced by: Larry Buchanan
- Starring: Frederick O'Neal; Annalena Lund
- Cinematography: Ralph K. Johnson
- Edited by: Larry Buchanan
- Music by: Joey Johnson
- Production company: Falcon International Corporation
- Distributed by: American International Pictures
- Release date: April 24, 1963; (Detroit)
- Running time: 104 minutes
- Country: United States
- Language: English
- Budget: $40,000

Free, White and 21 is a 1963 movie by self-proclaimed "schlockmeister" director Larry Buchanan. It was based on the true story of the controversial trial of a black man accused of raping a white woman in Dallas, Texas in the 1960s. The title is a version of the archaic American idiomatic phrase "free, white, and twenty-one", which means "beholden to no one".

== Plot ==
The central conflict in this film is whether African-American businessman Ernie Jones raped Swedish immigrant and civil rights Freedom Rider Greta Mae Hansen. Jones was the proprietor of the hotel at which Hansen decided to stay during her time in Dallas. The movie is primarily a courtroom drama, with many of the key events portrayed in flashback sequences as Jones and Hansen testify.

== Cast ==
- Frederick O'Neal as Ernie Jones
- Annalena Lund as Greta Mae Hansen
- George Edgley as Judge
- Johnny Hicks as Prosecuting Attorney Atkins
- George R. Russell as Defense Attorney Tyler

== Production ==
The movie was based on a true story about an English girl who stayed at a motel owned by Tony Davis, a black disc jockey. She later claimed Davis raped her and he was arrested. Davis was a friend of Buchanan, and agreed to work with him on the film even before the trial concluded. Before the film was completed, Buchanan showed an assembly cut to James H. Nicholson and Samuel Z. Arkoff of American International Pictures (AIP), who agreed to distribute it.

== Release ==
The film was released with the gimmick of having the audiences act as a jury and be given ballot papers to mark deciding whether the accused was innocent or guilty. The movie was successful at the box office and led to a series of collaborations between Buchanan and AIP. Samuel Z. Arkoff encouraged the filmmakers to produce a similar film specifically targeted at younger audiences. The resultant picture, Under Age, was released in 1964 and featured several of the same actors reprising their roles from Free, White and 21.

== Critical response ==
A contemporary review in The New York Times described the film as a "low-budget courtroom drama" in which "both protagonists emerge as unpleasant and unsympathetic characters," and that "some socially conscious spectators will find the subject matter significant enough to overlook the film's unconvincing dialogue, awkward acting and total absence of cinematic technique."

== See also ==
- List of American films of 1963
