= Paul Blaisdell =

American artist and visual effects creator (1927–1983)

- Born: July 21, 1927; Newport, Rhode Island, U.S.
- Died: July 10, 1983 (aged 55); Topanga, California, U.S.
- Occupations: Visual effects creator, actor
- Years active: 1955–1959
- Spouse: Jackie Blaisdell

Paul Blaisdell (July 21, 1927 – July 10, 1983) was an American painter, sculptor and visual effects creator, best remembered for his work in science fiction and horror B movies of the 1950s.

== Life and career ==
Blaisdell was born in Newport, Rhode Island in 1927, and grew up in Quincy, Massachusetts. He sketched and built models since early childhood, and he attended the New England School of Art and Design in Boston. Following graduation, he married Jackie and they moved to California, where he worked for Douglas Aircraft; on the side, he drew artwork for science fiction magazines, and met literary agent - and founding creative director/editor of the long-running monster magazine Famous Monsters of Filmland - Forrest J Ackerman, who became his agent.

In 1955, Blaisdell was hired to create the creature effects for Roger Corman's low-budget film The Beast with a Million Eyes, after which he spent several years designing monsters for B movies, earning a reputation for working quickly and cheaply. He often played the title creature on screen. Ackerman ran a feature article on Blaisdell in issue #1 of "Famous Monsters", but after Blaisdell had a major disagreement with the magazine's publisher James Warren, Ackerman was told not to promote Blaisdell in any future issues.

After a few years, Blaisdell became disenchanted with the business. Most of the costumes and props he created were allowed to decay in the 1950s due to poor storage conditions. Forrest J. Ackerman had the monster prop from Beast With a Million Eyes stored in direct sunlight in his home until it dried up and fell apart. The three-eyed mutant costume from Day the World Ended (nicknamed 'Marty') was destroyed multiple times by fans stealing scales for souvenirs, while on loan for promotional display in cinemas; it was lost after shipping to Hong Kong for another such press tour. The masks for Cat Girl, Saucer Men and It Conquered the World were all destroyed in the flaming finale of How to Make a Monster. The only costume that survived until 1959 was his She-Creature suit, before AIP forced him to alter the costume so it could be re-used in 1959's Ghost of Dragstrip Hollow, to the point where he felt it just wasn't the same costume any more - the female breasts were removed among other things. What was left of it was destroyed in a flood that hit Paul Blaisdell's house in 1979.

In the early 1960s, Blaisdell submitted monster designs for projected films including Goliath and the Dragon (1960) and Jack the Giant Killer (1962), but they weren't used, although he was still paid for his time. Producer James Nicholson tried to involve Blaisdell in two planned AIP TV series (Beyond the Barriers of Space and Out of This World), but the shows were never made.

In the 1960s Blaisdell, together with film editor/archivist/actor Bob Burns III, formed the company Black Shield to publish the "Famous Monsters"-inspired magazine Fantastic Monsters Of The Films for seven issues during 1962-63, for which Jim Harmon and Ron Haydock edited and wrote text. He gave up on the magazine when the plates for the eighth issue were destroyed in a fire at his printers. He later learned that the printer purposely burned his shop to fraudulently collect insurance. A large part of Bob Burns' still and lobby card collection went up in the flames. Blaisdell quit all involvement in the movie industry to work as a carpenter instead, and became something of a hermit. In 1965, he inherited property from his mother which he rented out to supplement his income. He and Bob Burns III (died December, 2025) remained best friends all their lives.

In 1979, Fangoria Magazine ran a two-part interview with him, followed by a retrospective in Cinefantastique. Filmmaker Fred Olen Ray tried to hire Blaisdell to work on the effects in his 1979 film Alien Dead, but Blaisdell was too ill to work.

Blaisdell suffered severe dental problems in later life and died of cancer at the age of 55 in Topanga, California in 1983, around the time that the home video market of the 1980s was beginning to resurrect fan interest in his 1950s films. Not one Hollywood newspaper ran his obituary.

Billikin model kit company put out several kits in the late 1980s based on Blaisdell's creature creations, including the monsters from It Conquered the World, The She-Creature, and Invasion of the Saucer Men. Later, a rival company produced a model kit based on the mutant in Day the World Ended. AIP's Sam Arkoff received a share of profit made on these kits, but Blaisdell's widow received nothing.

== Filmography ==
=== Effects ===
(Unless noted, Blaisdell created the monster costume in each film)

- The Beast with a Million Eyes (1955)
- Day the World Ended (1955)
- It Conquered the World (1956, uncredited) (Blaisdell nicknamed the monster "Beulah")
- The She-Creature (1956, uncredited)(Blaisdell nicknamed the monster "Cuddles")
- Voodoo Woman (1957, uncredited) (costume from She-Creature re-used)
- Not of This Earth (1957, uncredited)
- The Amazing Colossal Man (1957) (created the tiny-sized props)
- Cat Girl (1957, uncredited) (created the Cat Girl mask used only in the U.S. prints)
- From Hell It Came (1957, uncredited)
- Monster from Green Hell (1957) (submitted monster sketches, but was not hired to create the monster suit)
- Invasion of the Saucer Men (1957)
- Attack of the Puppet People (1958, uncredited) (created the giant-sized props & Mr. Hyde marionette costume)
- War of the Colossal Beast (1958) (tiny-sized props from Amazing Colossal Man re-used)
- Earth vs. the Spider (1958) aka The Spider (designed the two corpses and the giant spider leg)
- How to Make a Monster (1958 film) (1958) (masks from She-Creature, Cat Girl, It Conquered the World and Saucer Men re-used)
- It! The Terror from Beyond Space (1958)
- Teenagers from Outer Space (released in 1959) (designed the ray guns and the film's poster)
- Invisible Invaders (1959) (costume from "It!" re-used)
- The Ghost of Dragstrip Hollow (1959) (costume from She-Creature re-used)

=== Acting ===
- Day the World Ended (1955) Blaisdell played the creature
- Oklahoma Woman (1956) played one of Peggy Castle's henchmen
- Hot Rod Girl (1956) cameo, played the near-miss victim
- It Conquered the World (1956) played the creature
- The She-Creature (1956) played the creature
- Voodoo Woman (1957) played the creature as well as a drunk in the bar scene
- The Undead (1957) played a corpse in a coffin
- Dragstrip Girl (1957) cameo
- Sorority Girl (1957) cameo
- Motorcycle Gang (1957) cameo
- Invasion of the Saucer Men (1957) played one of the aliens
- The Ghost of Dragstrip Hollow (1959) (played the monster and "himself")
