= It Conquered the World =

1956 film by Roger Corman

- Theatrical release poster by Albert Kallis
- Directed by: Roger Corman
- Written by: Lou Rusoff; Charles B. Griffith (uncredited)
- Produced by: Roger Corman
- Starring: Peter Graves; Beverly Garland; Lee Van Cleef
- Cinematography: Fred E. West
- Edited by: Charles Gross
- Music by: Ronald Stein
- Production company: Sunset Productions
- Distributed by: American International Pictures
- Release date: August 1, 1956
- Running time: 71 minutes
- Country: United States
- Language: English

It Conquered the World is an independently made 1956 American science fiction film produced and directed by Roger Corman, and starring Peter Graves, Lee Van Cleef, Beverly Garland, and Sally Fraser. Shot in black-and-white, It Conquered the World was released theatrically by American International Pictures (AIP) as a double feature with The She-Creature.

It Conquered the World concerns an alien creature from the planet Venus that secretly wants to take control of the Earth. The creature makes radio contact with a disillusioned human scientist, who agrees to help because the scientist believes that such an alien intervention will bring peace and save a doomed humanity from itself.

== Plot ==
Dr. Tom Anderson, an embittered scientist, has made contact with a Venusian creature, while using his radio transmitter. The alien's secret plan is to take complete control of the Earth by enslaving humanity using mind control devices; the alien claims that it merely desires to bring peace to the world by eliminating all emotions. Anderson agrees to help the creature and even intends to allow it to assimilate his wife Claire and friend Dr. Paul Nelson. The Venusian disrupts all electric power on Earth, including motor vehicles, leaving Dr. Nelson to resort to riding a bicycle.

After avoiding a flying bat-like creature which carries the mind control device, Dr. Nelson returns home to find his wife, Joan, newly assimilated. She attempts to force his own assimilation using another bat-creature in her possession, and he is forced to kill her in self-defense. By then, the only people who are still free from the Venusian's influence are Nelson, Anderson, Anderson's wife Claire and a group of army soldiers stationed in the nearby woods.

Nelson finally persuades the paranoid Anderson that he has made a horrible mistake in blindly trusting the Venusian's motives, allying himself with a creature bent on world domination. When they discover that Tom's wife Claire has taken a rifle to the alien's cave in order to kill it, they hurriedly follow her, but the creature kills her before they can rescue her. Seeing the loss of everything he holds dear, Dr. Anderson viciously attacks the Venusian by holding a blowtorch to the creature's face; Anderson dies at the alien's hand as it expires. Arriving on the scene too late to save his friend, Nelson sadly reflects on how Anderson's misguided ideals led to death and devastation, and muses that a solution to humanity's problems must ultimately be achieved by humanity itself.

== Cast ==
- Peter Graves as Dr. Paul Nelson
- Lee Van Cleef as Dr. Tom Anderson
- Beverly Garland as Claire Anderson
- Sally Fraser as Joan Nelson
- Russ Bender as General James Pattick
- Taggart Casey as Sheriff N.J. Shallert
- Karen Kadler as Dr. Ellen Peters
- Dick Miller as Sgt. Neil
- Jonathan Haze as Corporal Manuel Ortiz
- Paul Harbor as Dr. Floyd Mason
- Charles B. Griffith as Dr. Pete Shelton
- Thomas E. Jackson as George Haskell
- Marshall Bradford as Secretary Platt
- David McMahon as General Carpenter
- Paul Blaisdell as The Monster (uncredited)

== Production ==
=== Development ===
The film was inspired by the box office success of Day the World Ended, also directed by Corman. It was written by Lou Rusoff (Sam Arkoff's brother-in-law), but before being completed, Rusoff's brother died and he had to leave for Canada. Corman then called in Charles Griffith to do a final rewrite, two days before filming began. Griffith does have a small part as a scientist.

Griffith said Rusoff's script "was incomprehensible which was strange because he was quite meticulous. Lou's brother was dying at the time which most likely had something to do with it." Griffith said he "wrote streams of dialogue. The picture was terrible."

Peter Graves' casting was announced in March 1956. Beverly Garland's casting was announced shortly afterwards.

=== Shooting ===
Filming began on April 3, 1956.

The design of the creature was Paul Blaisdell's idea, and he thought that coming from a big planet, It would have evolved to deal with heavy gravity and would therefore be low to the ground. Corman later admitted this was a mistake, saying the creature would have been more frightening had It been larger or taller. When Beverly Garland first saw the creature, she commented "That conquered the world?" and claimed she kicked It over (unlikely, since Blaisdell said in an interview that it took three men to turn the prop onto its side for the film's death scene finale).

Paul Blaisdell, who made the creature, researched Venus and "came to the conclusion that if it would have any life — it would be vegetable. In trying to make it look as far removed from anything resembling animal-like, I whipped up a nightmarish creation resembling a pear-shaped, cucumber- like creature, with two mobile, branch- like arms." He created the monster with rubber skin over a wooden frame, latex antenna and carved pine teeth. Flashlights were used to make the eyes glow. Originally the claws worked, but they were damaged on the first day of shooting. When Blaisdell unveiled the costume to the film's producer James Nicholson, Nicholson happily exclaimed "Paul, you've done it again!"

The creature was mounted on wheels. Blaisdell would crouch inside to enable the creature to move. "Originally, the creature was supposed to be in a dark cave all the time so an air of mystery would surround it," said Blaisdell. "But Roger decided it would be more effective if the creature would make a defiant appearance outside its hiding place and be destroyed by a charge of bayonet-armed soldiers. He also wanted the creature to appear dead in the film's finale by having it lying on its side!"

In the bayoneting scene, one of the soldiers stuck a bayonet in the wrong spot and nearly skewered Blaisdell's skull who was inside it, working the costume. Luckily Blaisdell's wife had persuaded him to don a helmet for protection, which deflected the blade.

The creature's working pincers were broken on the first day of shooting, but its arms could still be raised. The melting eye socket effect was completed using chocolate syrup. Blaisdell's wife was inside the suit, manually working the chocolate-squirting device, which backed up and squirted all over her.

Garland later recalled the first time she saw the creature at Bronson Canyon:

I said to Roger, "That isn't the monster! That little thing there is not the monster, is it?" He smiled back at me, "Yeah. Looks pretty good, doesn't it?" I said, "Roger! I could bop that monster over the head with my handbag!" This thing was no monster, it was a table ornament! He said, "Well, don't worry about it because we're gonna show you, and then we'll show the monster, back and forth." "Well, don't ever show us together, because if you do everybody'll know that I could step on this little creature!" Eventually I think they did do some extra work on the monster: I think they re-sprayed it so it would look a little scarier, and made it a good bit taller. When we actually filmed, they shot it in shadow, and never showed the two of us together.

Griffith said he called the creature prop "Denny Dimwit and somebody else called It an ice-cream cone. I was around when Paul Blaisdell was building it, and he thought the camera would make it look bigger." Blaisdell himself referred to it as "Beulah" during production. A good portion of Beulah disintegrated due to the shoddy care taken to store it, and whatever was left of it was destroyed in the fire-scene finale of AIP's 1958 film How to Make a Monster.

== Release history ==
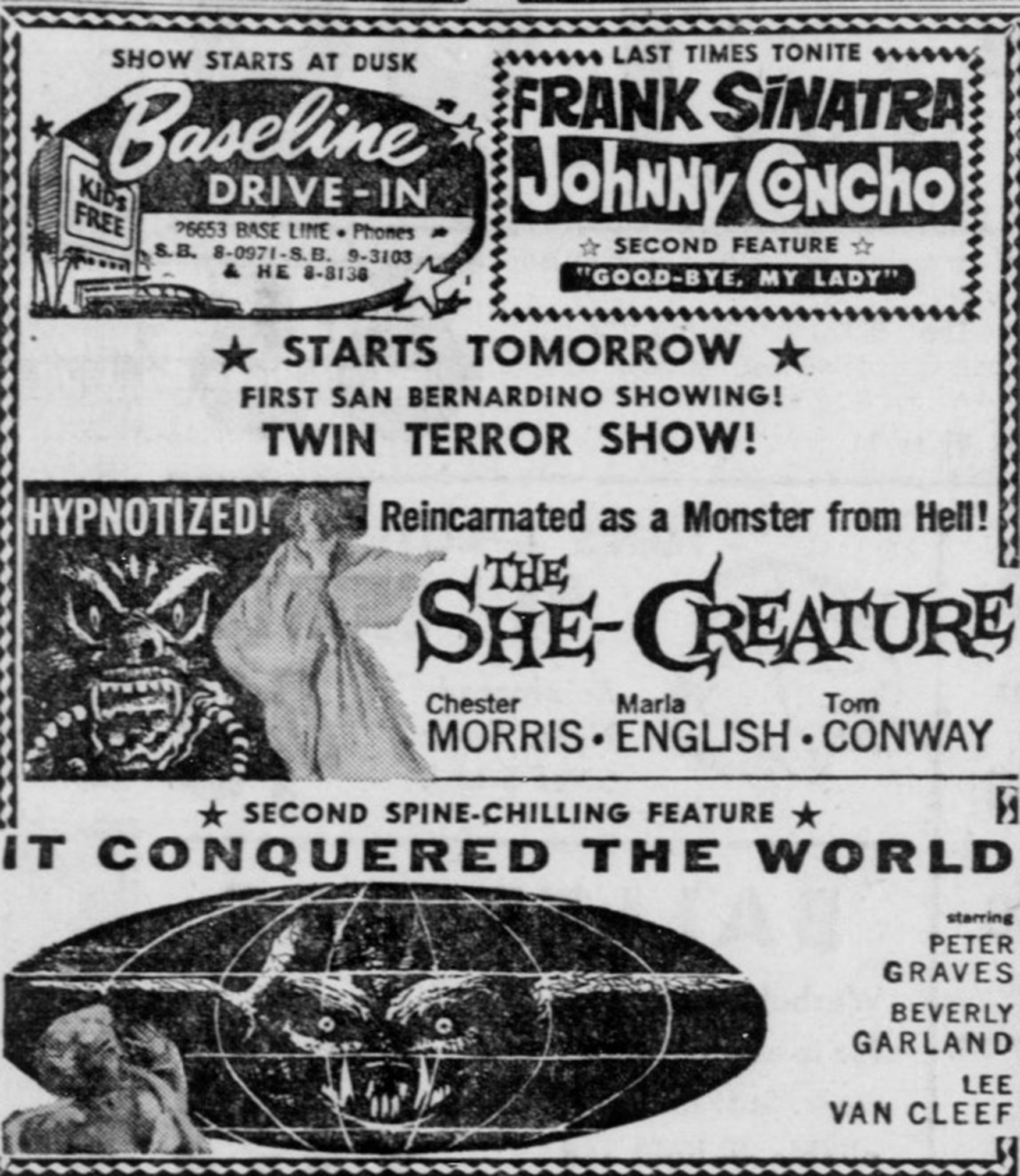
Drive-in advertisement from 1956 for It Conquered the World and co-feature, The She-Creature

It Conquered the World was released theatrically by AIP on August 1, 1956 on a double bill with The She-Creature.

The film originally received an "X" certificate in the UK, meaning that the picture could only be seen by adults. At issue, the scene of the creature being destroyed by a blowtorch was seen as animal cruelty. However, producer Samuel Z. Arkoff convinced the film board that the violence was against an otherworldly person, and not an animal, earning the film its passing certificate.

== Reception ==
Griffith said, "I asked for my name not to be on that picture, so I was unbilled. Surprisingly, it got good reviews."

Variety said "this flying saucer pic is a definite cut above normal, and should help pull its weight at b.o., despite modest budget... It must be admitted that the packed house of moppets at the show caught loved the gore, and continually shrieked avid appreciation. The Lou Rusoff screenplay poses some remarkably adult questions amidst the derring-do.. Corman does a generally good job of mingling the necessary backgroundsetting with fast-paced dialog... Only a few patches of abstract discussion, fail to hold audience attention.... Corman would have been wiser to merely suggest the creature, rather than construct the awesome-looking and mechanically clumsy, rubberized horror. It inspired more titters than terror."

Sight and Sound called it "sharp, economical and really frightening".

Film historian and critic Leonard Maltin called It Conquered the World "... well acted and interesting but awkwardly plotted".

Monthly Film Bulletin found the film exciting.

Time Out magazine, gave the film a negative review, criticizing its poor special effects. Critic Tony Rayns opined, "You have to see a movie like this to realise that film-makers who feel they have nothing to lose are rarer than you'd think".

The Chicago Reader gave the film a generally positive review, saying, "Amazingly, this 1953 [sic] picture isn't half bad". Allmovie gave the film 3 out of 5 stars, calling it an "above-average quickie".

Creature Feature gave the movie 3 out of 5 stars, praising its campiness.

== Later releases ==
During the 1960s, It Conquered the World was syndicated to television by American International Television. VHS versions appeared in the 1990s on the US home video market (RCA Columbia Home Video), but these are no longer in distribution, nor is the film available on DVD or Blu-ray in the US or in the UK.

In 2001, Susan Hart, the widow of AIP co-founder James H. Nicholson, sued A&E Networks for copyright infringement after the channel used footage from the film in a documentary about Peter Graves.

== Remake ==
In 1966, It Conquered the World was remade in 16mm color by self-proclaimed "schlockmeister" Larry Buchanan after he secured the rights from distributor AIP. He retitled the film Zontar, the Thing from Venus and sold it to television syndication.

== In popular culture ==
- Frank Zappa's 1974 live album Roxy & Elsewhere referred to the film in the introduction for the song "Cheepnis".
- The film's closing monologue inspired the similar ending of The Rocky Horror Picture Show.
- Filmmaker Jim Wynorski included a Beulah-lookalike monster in the finale of his horror/comedy Transylvania Twist as a respectful homage to the old 1950s AIP films.
- In 1988, edited parts of "It Conquered the World" were shown at the beginning of the movie Elvira: Mistress of the Dark
- In 1991, It Conquered the World was the subject of the comedy television series Mystery Science Theater 3000; joke topics included poor monster props, occasionally wooden acting, and an overblown closing monologue, although Dr. Clayton Forrester did concede it was probably Roger Corman's "finest film to date". The monologue was replayed three times at the end of the episode, first watched again by Joel and the Bots, then by the Mads, and finally over the credits, with the stinger being the beginning of the monologue again.
- Audio samples from the film were included in the song "Facing That" from M83's self-titled debut album, released in 2001.
- Season 4, episode 12 of SCTV featured an overarching story, "Zontar," which was closely based on It Conquered the World. Bonar Bain was featured as the scientist played by Lee Van Cleef.

== See also ==
- List of American films of 1956
