= It's Alive! (1969 film) =

1969 American horror movie by Larry Buchanan

'It's Alive!'
- Theatrical release poster
- Directed by: Larry Buchanan
- Written by: Larry Buchanan; Richard Matheson
- Produced by: Ross Lynch (producer); Edwin Tobolowsky (associate producer)
- Starring: Tommy Kirk; Shirley Bonne
- Cinematography: Robert B. Alcott
- Edited by: Larry Buchanan
- Distributed by: American International Pictures
- Release date: October 30, 1969
- Running time: 80 minutes
- Country: United States
- Language: English

It's Alive! is a 1969 American monster movie directed by Larry Buchanan and distributed by American International Pictures. The story concerns a mad farmer who tries to feed a stranded couple to a dinosaur he keeps in a cave.

== Plot ==
Norman Sterns and Leela Sterns are newlyweds who are driving from their home in New York City to Los Angeles. They become lost and run out of gas, stranding them in the rural Ozark countryside. They meet a friendly paleontologist named Wayne Thomas. Wayne suggests that they visit the nearest farm that could provide gas. The farm is run by a strange man named Greely, who tells them that the gasoline truck was supposed to arrive the previous day, but since it didn't, he expects it there any minute. Greely suggests that they go inside to the parlor, where it's cooler. On the way up to the house, he asks if they know anybody out here, in case they may be waiting for them. They say no, and when they get inside, Greely goes off to tell his "housekeeper" Bella to make some iced tea. She argues with him about what he will "do with them", but Greely smacks her, and threatens that she will "take their place" if she doesn't serve them some tea.

Thomas arrives and Greely goes outside. He tells them that their car won't start. Wayne decides to take a look at the engine and tells Greely to go back to his truck and get a tool. Greely instead beats him on the back of the head with it and drags his body off. Meanwhile, Leela appears to be worried about Greely, because he is acting strange and his eyes don't look right. She then compares his eyes to a stuffed lizard across the room. Greely comes back inside and tells them that he had to do a chore. Leela wants to go back outside, but Greely tells them that they could check out his "collection" while waiting for the truck.

He takes them out to the yard and shows them his "zoo", which includes ordinary animals like turtles, rattlesnakes, coyotes, and a bobcat. Greely then tells them that they should have a look at his "prize", which is located deep in a mountain cave system behind his home. He puts them in a small room which he claims he had set up for tourists while he goes to turn on the rest of the power. However, it was a trap, as Greely pulls a lever and drops some bars down, blocking their way out. Greely leaves the cave, laughing as Leela discovers that Thomas is inside the cell as well, badly wounded but alive. He tells them that Greely threw him into another cavern below them, and left him there, but he found a way out and crawled in the cell, right as they arrived.

Norman suggests that there may be a way out down there, and begins a descent into the cavern. A reluctant Wayne and Leela follow and discover a prehistoric, aquatic dinosaur coming out of a spring, which Greely apparently feeds live victims to. Greely catches them in the enclosure and points a pistol at them, attempting to force them down in there to be eaten. Greely shoots Wayne in the abdomen, but Wayne throws an object at Greely and hits his gun hand, causing the pistol to fall into the enclosure. Norman urges Leela to go for the gun, but Greely tells him that it won't do him any good, and leaves. Norman rushes down and gets the pistol, but suddenly the monster appears out of the water as Leela and Wayne warn him. Norman fires the gun at the creature, but it has no effect, and it kills him before he gets the chance to escape. Bella arrives and reveals that she is not Greely's housekeeper; he kidnapped her and abused her until her will was broken and she agreed to do whatever he told her to do to avoid being fed to the creature. Wayne convinces Bella to help them.

Wayne remembers that he has some dynamite in his car, and he asks Bella to sneak upstairs and bring back some of it. Greely becomes suspicious of Bella, and he drugs the coffee that she brings to the prisoners. Leela and Wayne are overcome by the drug, but not before Wayne hides the dynamite. When Wayne comes to, he retrieves it, but Greely intervenes and threatens to feed Leela to the creature if she will not willingly become his new servant. Bella, having heard that he plans to dispose of her, goes down there.

Greely recovers his pistol, but Wayne overcomes Greely and knocks him unconscious. Bella ignites the dynamite and explains to Greely that she plans to blow up the cave to kill both the dinosaur and Greely. Greely grabs his pistol and kills her, right as the monster is about to kill Greely. The dynamite explodes, collapsing the cavern and burying the dinosaur and Greely. Wayne and Leela escape in Wayne's car to an unknown future.

== Cast ==
- Tommy Kirk as Wayne Thomas
- Shirley Bonne as Leela Sterns
- Bill Thurman as Greely
- Annabelle Weenick as Bella
- Corveth Ousterhouse as Norman Sterns

== Production ==
In 1963, John Tomerlin was reportedly adapting the Richard Matheson story "Being" for American International Pictures under the title It's Alive.

The film was reportedly originally written for Peter Lorre.

Buchanan stated that the film was shot in a cave in Arkansas in six days.

"One day we did 57 set-ups!" he said. "We didn't see one foot of film until the whole batch came from the lab a week later. Nine days later we had cut, scored and printed the film and delivered it to AlP, who made a five o'clock deadline for a package to one of their stations. It was frantic. It was a different way of doing movies."

Kirk had previously made Mars Needs Women for Buchanan. The actor later called the film "a monster movie so cheap that the monster wore a scuba suit and had ping-pong balls for eyes".

Kirk recalled "I worked very hard on It's Alive, trying to be believable about being pursued by some kind of monster, and it turned out the bastard wouldn't spend a nickel on special effects. Instead, he got the guy who was the stand-in — the all-purpose stand-in — to put on a scuba suit with cut-out ping-pong balls for eyes, and that was the monster! It fills me with rage, really. It fills me with anger, 'cause it's so disgusting to make a film that cheap and shoddy. I feel very great anger that I even consented to be in it; it was just disgusting!"

The cave scenes were filmed in Onyx Cave in Eureka Springs, Arkansas.

The monster suit for the dinosaur was reused from one of Buchanan's older films, Creature of Destruction.

Buchanan said "Tommy was a really fine actor, but he just disappeared into the woodwork. He had a lot of emotional problems, and needed to talk things out. And the problem of being the director and an Aquarius, I didn't get much sleep having to listen to those stories. After putting in a 10-hour day, he'd want to go and have a few beers until two in the morning. We'd talk about Europe, traveling, philosophy, what he wanted to do with his life. He is a very cultured person, and a very proud person, so he probably took as much as he could before dropping out."

== Reception ==
The film received negative reviews for its poor editing, bad writing, bad acting, and terrible special effects.

A review in DVD Talk reported that the film features "endless footage of a couple driving" and that "[i]f you disregard the kill scenes, the laughable rubber monster suit, the clunky photography, the plodding pace, and ample padding, It's Alive! really isn't that bad," adding that "the cast does a decent job with what they're given." A review in TV Guide described the film as "nonsensical sci-fi."

== See also ==
- List of films featuring dinosaurs
