= The She-Creature =

1956 film by Edward L. Cahn

The She Creature
- Theatrical release poster
- Directed by: Edward L. Cahn
- Written by: Lou Rusoff
- Produced by: Alex Gordon
- Starring: Chester Morris; Marla English; Tom Conway; Cathy Downs; Paul Blaisdell
- Cinematography: Frederick E. West
- Edited by: Ronald Sinclair
- Music by: Ronald Stein
- Production company: Golden State Productions
- Distributed by: American International Pictures
- Release date: August 1, 1956
- Running time: 77 minutes
- Country: United States
- Language: English
- Budget: $104,000

The She-Creature (or The She Creature) is a 1956 American black-and-white science fiction horror film, released by American International Pictures (AIP) from a script by Lou Rusoff (brother-in-law of AIP executive Samuel Z. Arkoff). It was produced by Alex Gordon, directed by Edward L. Cahn, and stars Chester Morris, Marla English, and Tom Conway, with Frieda Inescort and El Brendel in smaller roles. The producers hired Marla English because they thought she bore a strong resemblance to Elizabeth Taylor.

The film was released by AIP as a double feature with It Conquered the World.

== Plot ==
Dr. Carlo Lombardi, an unctuous carnival hypnotist, conducts experiments in hypnotic regression that take his unwitting female subject Andrea Talbott to a past life as a prehistoric humanoid form of sea life. He uses the physical manifestation of the prehistoric creature to commit murders.

== Cast ==
- Chester Morris as hypnotist Dr. Carlo Lombardi, a mad scientist
- Tom Conway as showman Timothy Chappel
- Cathy Downs as Dorothy Chappel, Timothy's daughter
- Lance Fuller as Dr. Ted Erickson
- Ron Randell as Lt. Ed James
- Frieda Inescort as Mrs. Chappel
- Marla English as Andrea Talbott
- Frank Jenks as plainclothes sergeant
- El Brendel as Olaf, the butler
- Paul Dubov as Johnny
- William Hudson as Bob (credited as Bill Hudson)
- Flo Bert as Marta
- Jeanne Evans as Mrs. Brown
- Kenneth MacDonald as physician
- Jack Mulhall as Lombardi's lawyer
- Spike as King, the family dog
- Paul Blaisdell as The She-Creature
- Luana Walters as party guest (her last acting role)

== Production ==
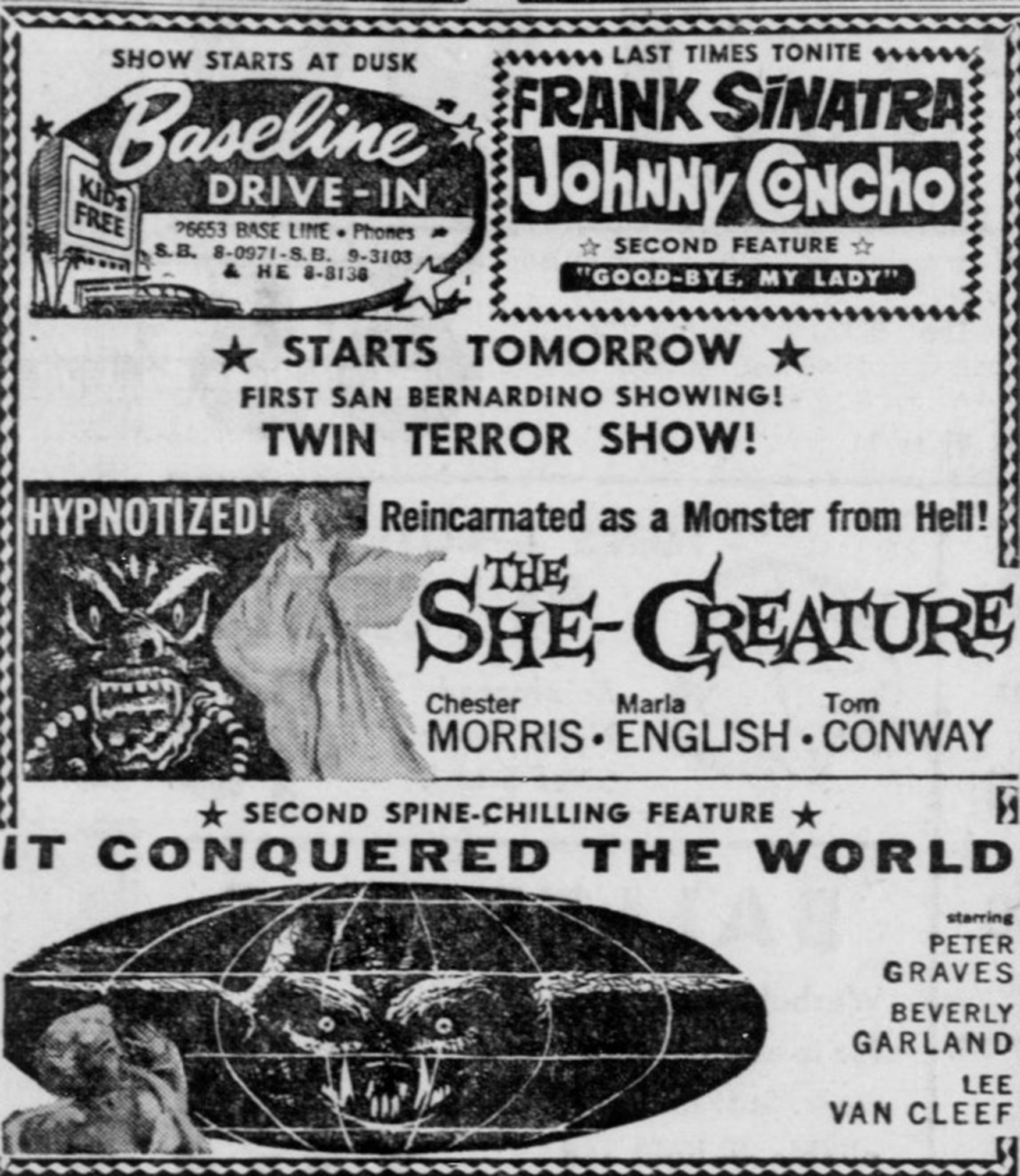
Drive-in advertisement from 1956 featuring The She-Creature with companion feature, It Conquered the World.

The story was inspired by the success of the best-selling Morey Bernstein book The Search for Bridey Murphy, which concerned hypnotism and reincarnation. Exhibitor Jerry Zigmond suggested this subject might make a good film, and AIP commissioned Lou Rusoff to write a script.

AIP did not have enough money to entirely finance the film, so the company asked producer Alex Gordon if he could contribute the remainder. Israel Berman, a colleague of Gordon's brother Richard, knew financier Jack Doppelt, who agreed to provide $40,000 of the film's $104,000 budget.

Edward L. Cahn persuaded his old actor friend Edward Arnold to star for $3,000 for one week's work, and also cast Peter Lorre as the hypnotist. Arnold died two days before production began, while Peter Lorre read the script after which he immediately pulled out of the film and fired his agent for committing him to the project without consulting him first. The producer had to find a substitute cast quickly, settling on Chester Morris and Tom Conway. This was Ron Randell's first film in America in a number of years.

The monster costume was created by master make-up artist Paul Blaisdell and is considered one of his best. Parts of the costume were re-used in three later AIP films. Blaisdell nicknamed the monster "Cuddles". The costume was eventually destroyed in a flood that hit his Topanga Canyon home in 1979.

As usual, Blaisdell played the monster in every scene. Blaisdell nearly got injured when the director instructed him to smash his way through a wooden door in one of the film's action sequences, without realizing the door had been reinforced with plywood. Also in the beach scenes where the creature had to be seen emerging from the surf, Blaisdell was told to wade in up to his waist instead of his knees. The costume got so waterlogged, Blaisdell could hardly propel himself out of the water, especially with the tide working against him. Amazingly, most of this scene was later excised from the finished film due to poor quality image.

== Release ==
Gordon, who deferred his $2,500 producer's fee until the film returned its cost, said that the movie was profitable a year and half after its release. Within a few days of finishing the film, AIP featured the She Creature costume in live appearances on several L.A. talk shows to promote the film's grand opening. Blaisdell had his best friend Bob Burns wear the suit on the TV programs, since he was too worn out himself.

== Reception ==
Variety wrote it had "a good quota of chills".

Author and film critic Leonard Maltin awarded the film 2 out of 4 stars, calling it "slow and preposterous but effectively moody, with one of Paul Blaisdell's more memorable monsters".

On his website Fantastic Movie Musings and Ramblings, Dave Sindelar wrote, "There is a clever concept behind this attempt to combine the Bridey Murphy concept with a monster movie; unfortunately, a poor script and some ineffectual acting hamstring the attempt".

TV Guide awarded the film 1 out of 4 stars, writing, "Some interesting concepts were touched on, but quickly pushed to the background in the name of plot development, which in this case is one cliche after another".

Dennis Schwartz from Ozus' World Movie Reviews awarded the film a grade of C, calling it "Amusing hokum".

== Legacy ==
In 1967, American International commissioned Larry Buchanan to remake the film in color for television, retitled as Creature of Destruction.

The original film is featured in an eighth season episode of movie-mocking television show Mystery Science Theater 3000 and an episode of Cinema Insomnia.

In 2001, producer and special effects artist Stan Winston, remade the film as part of his Creature Features series.
