= Ronald Stein =

American composer (1930–1988)

- Born: Louis Ronald Stein; April 12, 1930; St. Louis, Missouri, U.S.
- Died: August 15, 1988 (aged 58) Los Angeles, California, U.S.
- Genres: Film score
- Occupations: Composer, conductor, pianist
- Instrument: Piano

Louis Ronald Stein (April 12, 1930 - August 15, 1988) was an American film composer and conductor. At the height of his career in the 1950s and 1960s, he was best known for scoring B movies produced by American International Pictures and Roger Corman.

== Early life and education ==
Born and raised in St. Louis, Stein learned how to play piano from his mother Ceclia, a pianist for silent film theaters. From 1938 to 1947, he was privately tutored at Leo C. Miller's Institute of Music, and then studied at Washington University from 1947 to 1951, and also worked as the assistant conductor for the St. Louis Municipal Opera Theatre.

Stein attended Yale University in 1951, but was drafted into the United States Army Special Services, serving at Fort Dix, New Jersey from 1952 to 1954. When he returned home, Stein became a solo pianist at St. Louis Symphony Orchestra.

== Career ==
In 1955, Stein composed his first film score, Apache Woman. After this, he signed a 5-year contract with American International Pictures, with whom he composed 55 scores.

Stein wrote scores for many low-budget horror and exploitation films during the 1950s and 1960s, most of which were released by American International Pictures. These included It Conquered the World, Attack of the Crab Monsters, Invasion of the Saucer Men, Attack of the 50 Foot Woman, Hot Rod Gang, The Premature Burial and The Haunted Palace. He also provided scores for major studio productions such as Francis Ford Coppola's The Rain People and Richard Rush's Getting Straight, whose directors he met during their days at AIP.

In 1973, Stein turned from composing to supervising post-production for Paragon Films, which he continued until 1978. Additionally, Stein taught composition at California State University, Northridge, and from 1980 to 1985, he worked as a professor of composition, arranging, orchestration, and theory at the University of Colorado Denver. After this, Stein returned to Los Angeles, where he continued to work as a post-production supervisor for several films.

== Personal life ==
Stein married Harlene Hiken after graduating from Washington University in 1951, and together they had four children. Stein's youngest child Victor Warren works as an actor, writer, director, and producer, with his own production company Glydascope Inc., in Los Angeles.

=== Death ===
On August 15, 1988, Stein died from pancreatic cancer in the Mission Hills neighborhood of Los Angeles, at the age of 58.

== Legacy ==
Some of Stein's papers and scores, especially for the films Not of This Earth and Of Love and Desire can be found in the archives of the Music Library at Washington University in St. Louis.

His song "Pigs Go Home", from the 1970 film Getting Straight, was sampled by rapper Eminem for his 1999 song "Guilty Conscience".

== Selected filmography ==
- Apache Woman (1955)
- The Phantom from 10,000 Leagues (1955)
- Day the World Ended (1955)
- Gunslinger (1956)
- The Oklahoma Woman (1956)
- Girls in Prison (1956)
- It Conquered the World (1956)
- The She-Creature (1956)
- Flesh and the Spur (1956)
- Runaway Daughters (1956)
- Naked Paradise (1957)
- Not of This Earth (1957)
- Attack of the Crab Monsters (1957)
- Invasion of the Saucer Men (1957)
- Reform School Girl (1957)
- Sorority Girl (1957)
- The Undead (1957)
- Dragstrip Girl (1957)
- Jet Attack (1958)
- Suicide Battalion (1958)
- Attack of the 50 Foot Woman (1958)
- The Bonnie Parker Story (1958)
- High School Hellcats (1958)
- Hot Rod Gang (1958)
- She Gods of Shark Reef (1958)
- Devil's Partner (1958)
- Paratroop Command (1959)
- Tank Commando (1959)
- The Legend of Tom Dooley (1959)
- Diary of a High School Bride (1959)
- Ghost of Dragstrip Hollow (1959)
- Last Woman on Earth (1960)
- Too Soon to Love (1960)
- The Threat (1960)
- The Girl in Lovers Lane (1960)
- Dinosaurus! (1960)
- Raymie (1960)
- The Little Shop of Horrors (1960)
- Atlas (1961)
- The Bashful Elephant (1961)
- War Is Hell (1961)
- Journey to the Seventh Planet (1962)
- The Underwater City (1962)
- The Premature Burial (1962)
- Warriors Five (1962)
- Dime with a Halo (1963)
- The Terror (1963)
- The Young and The Brave (1963)
- The Haunted Palace (1963)
- Of Love and Desire (1963)
- Dementia 13 (1963)
- Requiem for a Gunfighter (1965)
- The Bounty Killer (1965)
- Voyage to the Prehistoric Planet (1965)
- Blood Bath (1966)
- Queen of Blood (1966) credited as Leonard Morand
- Spider Baby (1968)
- Psych-Out (1968)
- The Rain People (1969)
- Getting Straight (1970)
- Frankenstein's Great Aunt Tillie (1984)
- The Naked Monster (2005)
