= Larry Buchanan =

American film director (1923–2004)

Larry Buchanan (January 31, 1923 − December 2, 2004), born Marcus Larry Seale Jr., was a film director, producer and writer, who proclaimed himself a "schlockmeister". Many of his extremely low-budget films have landed on "worst movie" lists or in the public domain, but all at least broke even and many made a profit. Most of his films were made for television and were never shown theatrically.

He is perhaps most famous for his American International Pictures films In the Year 2889, The Eye Creatures, Zontar, the Thing from Venus, Curse of the Swamp Creature, Creature of Destruction, It's Alive!, and Mars Needs Women, all of which were released directly to late night television.

== Early life ==
Buchanan was born in Lost Prairie, Texas, on Jan. 31, 1923. He was orphaned as a baby and was raised in Dallas in an orphanage. It was while growing up there that he became fascinated with the movies which were shown in the orphanage's theater. He considered becoming a minister early in life, but got into the movie industry instead.

== Career ==
Buchanan visited Hollywood and landed a job in the props department at 20th Century Fox. It was while working here that his acting career got off the ground. He played some bit parts in movies, and the studio gave him the stage name "Larry Buchanan", which he used for his entire career. He enlisted in the United States Army Signal Corps in order to learn how to direct movies. He was based in New York, which allowed him to act in stage plays in the evenings.

In the early 1950s, Buchanan began producing, directing, writing, editing, and acting in his own low budget movies. The first was a one-reeler, The Cowboy (1949), which he shot back in Dallas for $900. His first feature film was Grubsteak (1952); he knew Stanley Kubrick from working in New York at this time and Kubrick offered to be his cinematographer on Grubsteak, but he wanted more money than Buchanan could pay. Buchanan worked as an assistant to director George Cukor on The Marrying Kind (1952).

Buchanan is perhaps best known for exploitation, science fiction, and other genre films, including Free, White and 21 (1963), The Naked Witch (1964, made for $8,000), High Yellow (1965), A Bullet for Pretty Boy (1970), Goodbye, Norma Jean (1976), Hughes and Harlow: Angels in Hell (1977), Mistress of the Apes (1979), The Loch Ness Horror (1981) and Goodnight, Sweet Marilyn (1989).

Among Buchanan's work, several direct-to-television films which he wrote, produced, and directed back in Dallas under his own "Azalea Films" imprint in the mid-to-late-1960s for American International Pictures, still generate a good degree of fan attention today. The titles − The Eye Creatures (1967), Zontar, the Thing from Venus (1967), Creature of Destruction (1967), Mars Needs Women (1968), Curse of the Swamp Creature (1968), In the Year 2889 (1969), Hell Raiders (1969), and It's Alive! (1969) − were largely color remakes of American International Pictures films from the 1950s. Buchanan's instructions from AIP were: "We want cheap color pictures, we want half-assed names in them, we want them eighty minutes long and we want them now".

In 1964 Buchanan created The Trial of Lee Harvey Oswald, which presented an alternate history in which Lee Harvey Oswald was not killed by Jack Ruby and stood trial for the assassination of John F. Kennedy. In 1984 he produced Down on Us, which charged that the U.S. government was responsible for the deaths of Jimi Hendrix, Jim Morrison and Janis Joplin.

Among the notable features of Buchanan's movies were:

- Monsters with eyes literally made from ping-pong balls
- day-for-night footage "with a blue gel slapped across the camera lens with the noonday sun clearly visible on surfaces of water, car bumpers, etc."
- Extremely low production values
- One reasonably well-known (if over-the-hill) lead actor (such as John Ashley or John Agar).

== Later life, death, and legacy ==
Buchanan died in Tucson, Arizona on December 2, 2004, at age 81. He died of complications from a collapsed lung, according to his wife, Joan Buchanan (they were married for 52 years). Buchanan left behind his wife, one daughter and three sons.

After his death, a long obituary in The New York Times summarized his work thus: "One quality united Mr. Buchanan's diverse output: It was not so much that his films were bad; they were deeply, dazzlingly, unrepentantly bad. His work called to mind a famous line from H. L. Mencken, who, describing President Warren G. Harding's prose, said, 'It is so bad that a sort of grandeur creeps into it.'"

He left behind an entire career of poorly made films, many of which have become cult films for being "so-bad-they're-good". Buchanan chronicled his unusual life in his 1997 autobiography, It Came from Hunger: Tales of a Cinema Schlockmeister. This only authoritative record of Buchanan's life has recently been reprinted as a softcover book available on Amazon, the story of Buchanan's arduous journey from Texas orphanage to Hollywood director, and a look inside the wacky world of low budget filmmaking.

== The AIP TV Movies ==
- The Eye Creatures (1967) - remake of Invasion of the Saucer Men (1957)
- Zontar, the Thing from Venus (1967) - remake of It Conquered the World (1956)
- Creature of Destruction (1967) - remake of The She-Creature (1956)
- Mars Needs Women (1968) - an original script by Buchanan
- Curse of the Swamp Creature (1968) - loose remake of Voodoo Woman (1957)
- In the Year 2889 (1969) - remake of Day the World Ended (1955)
- Hell Raiders (1969) - remake of Suicide Battalion (1958)
- It's Alive! (1969) - adapted from the Richard Matheson story Being
