= List of Have Gun – Will Travel episodes =

Have Gun – Will Travel is an American Western television series that was produced and originally broadcast by CBS on Saturdays at 9:30–10:00 pm (EST) from 1957 through 1963. The television version of the series starring Richard Boone was rated number three or number four in the Nielsen ratings every year of its first four seasons.

Set in the period of the Old West, the series follows the adventures of "Paladin", played by Richard Boone, a gentleman investigator/gunfighter who travels around the Old West working as a gunfighter for hire. Although Paladin charges steep fees to clients who can afford to hire him, typically $1000 per job, he provides his services for free to poor people who need his help.

== Series overview ==
Season	Episodes	Originally released		Rank	Average viewership (in millions)
Season	Episodes	First released	Last released	Rank	Average viewership (in millions)
1	39	September 14, 1957	June 14, 1958	4	14.1
2	39	September 13, 1958	June 20, 1959	3	15.1
3	39	September 12, 1959	June 18, 1960	3	15.9
4	38	September 10, 1960	June 10, 1961	3	14.6
5	38	September 16, 1961	June 2, 1962	29	10.8
6	32	September 15, 1962	April 20, 1963	29	10.5

== Episodes ==
=== Season 1 (1957–58) ===
No. overall	No. in season	Title	Directed by	Written by	Original release date
1	1	"Three Bells to Perdido"	Andrew V. McLaglen	Herb Meadow & Sam Rolfe	September 14, 1957
Paladin is hired to bring back a rancher's daughter (Janice Rule), but he must face the girl's gunfighter husband (Jack Lord).
2	2	"The Outlaw"	Andrew V. McLaglen	Sam Rolfe	September 21, 1957
A criminal (Charles Bronson) breaks out of jail to get revenge on the banker who testified against him. Featuring Grant Withers. A "Wanted Dead or Alive " poster bearing picture of Charles Bronson character revealed at opening of episode in lobby of Hotel Carlton.
3	3	"The Great Mojave Chase"	Andrew V. McLaglen	Gene Roddenberry	September 28, 1957
Paladin attempts to win a bet that he can ride through the Mojave desert on a camel. Featuring Lawrence Dobkin and Claude Akins.
4	4	"Winchester Quarantine"	Andrew V. McLaglen	Herb Meadow	October 5, 1957
Paladin offers to help an Indian (Anthony Caruso) who has been beaten up by cowboys. Featuring Leo Gordon and Vic Perrin.
5	5	"A Matter of Ethics"	Andrew V. McLaglen	Sam Rolfe	October 12, 1957
Paladin is tasked with the safe delivery of a prisoner charged with murder. Featuring Angie Dickinson, Harold J. Stone and Strother Martin.
6	6	"The Bride"	Andrew V. McLaglen	Steve Fisher	October 19, 1957
A mail-order bride named Christie Smith (Marian Seldes) wonders about her fate. Featuring Mike Connors.
7	7	"Strange Vendetta"	Andrew V. McLaglen	Ken Kolb	October 26, 1957
Paladin must figure who is trying to kill his new friend (June Vincent) and why. Featuring Michael Pate.
8	8	"High Wire"	Andrew V. McLaglen	Don Brinkley	November 2, 1957
Paladin teams up with a hobo (Strother Martin) to swindle crooked gamblers. Featuring Fay Spain, John Dehner, Jack Albertson and Buddy Baer.
9	9	"Show of Force"	Andrew V. McLaglen	Ken Kolb & Lee Erwin	November 9, 1957
The fifty rifles that Paladin won in a poker game prove to be useful when he gets involved in a range war. Featuring Rodolfo Acosta and Vic Perrin.
10	10	"The Long Night"	Andrew V. McLaglen	Sam Rolfe	November 16, 1957
Paladin and two other men (James Best, William Schallert) are held hostage by a cattle baron (Kent Smith) who intends to hang one of them at sunrise for his wife's murder.
11	11	"The Colonel and the Lady"	Andrew V. McLaglen	Michael Fessier	November 23, 1957
Paladin takes on the search for a former silver-camp queen. Featuring Robert F. Simon, June Vincent, Denver Pyle, Robert J. Stevenson, Peggy Rea and Woodrow Chambliss.
12	12	"No Visitors"	Andrew V. McLaglen	Don Brinkley	November 30, 1957
Paladin discovers a woman (June Lockhart) and a baby abandoned by a wagon master who said the baby had typhoid. Featuring Grant Withers and Whit Bissell.
13	13	"The Englishman"	Andrew V. McLaglen	Sam Rolfe	December 7, 1957
Paladin takes an English man and woman (Tom Helmore, Alix Talton) to a new ranch in Montana where an angry trader plots against them.
14	14	"The Yuma Treasure"	Andrew V. McLaglen	Gene Roddenberry	December 14, 1957
A cavalry major (Warren Stevens) asks for Paladin's help in dealing with restless Maricopas. Featuring Harry Landers, Henry Brandon, Russ Thorson and Barry Cahill.
15	15	"The Hanging Cross"	Andrew V. McLaglen	Gene Roddenberry	December 21, 1957
Paladin is sent to investigate the possibility of a Pawnee chief (Abraham Sofaer) holding a rancher's son (Johnny Crawford) hostage.
16	16	"Helen of Abajinian"	Andrew V. McLaglen	Gene Roddenberry	December 28, 1957
Paladin goes after a vintner's daughter (Lisa Gaye) who has run off with a cowboy (Wright King). Featuring Harold J. Stone, Vladimir Sokoloff, Nick Dennis and Naomi Stevens. Note: Johnny Western's iconic theme song (co-written by himself, Richard Boone, and Sam Rolfe) makes its debut in this episode.
17	17	"Ella West"	Andrew V. McLaglen	Gene Roddenberry	January 4, 1958
Paladin tries to make a lady out of the unbearable Ella West (Norma Crane). Featuring Mike Mazurki.
18	18	"The Reasonable Man"	Andrew V. McLaglen	Joel Kane & Ken Kolb	January 11, 1958
Paladin helps a teenager (Tom Pittman) prepare for a gun duel with his foster father.
19	19	"The High-Graders"	Andrew V. McLaglen	Story by : Wilton Schiller & Jack Laird; Teleplay by : Ken Kolb, Wilton Schiller & Jack Laird	January 18, 1958
While investigating a friend's murder, Paladin finds out that the man's heirs are being systematically robbed. Featuring Susan Cabot, Robert J. Wilke and Bob Steele.
20	20	"The Last Laugh"	Andrew V. McLaglen	Don Brinkley	January 25, 1958
A rancher blames Paladin for his wife's paralysis. Fearuring Jean Allison, Peter Whitney, Stuart Whitman and Murray Hamilton.
21	21	"The Bostonian"	Andrew V. McLaglen	Berni Gould, Milton Pascal & Ken Kolb	February 1, 1958
Paladin attempts to protect a tenderfoot who has become the target of a seasoned cattleman. Featuring Constance Ford and Harry Townes.
22	22	"The Singer"	Andrew V. McLaglen	Ken Kolb & Sam Peckinpah	February 8, 1958
A cowboy (Richard Long) says his singer ex-girlfriend (Joan Weldon) was forced to marry a rancher (Denver Pyle) against her wishes. Also stars Jay Adler and Gloria Pall.
23	23	"Bitter Wine"	Andrew V. McLaglen	Ken Kolb	February 15, 1958
It is up to Paladin to save a vineyard from seepage coming from an oil well. Featuring Eduardo Ciannelli.
24	24	"Girl from Piccadilly"	Lewis Milestone	Ken Kolb	February 22, 1958
A man from San Francisco (Carl Benton Reid) hires Paladin to find his missing daughter-in-law (Betsy von Furstenberg). Featuring Charles Aidman and William Schallert.
25	25	"The O'Hare Story"	Andrew V. McLaglen	Malvin Wald & Jack Jacobs	March 1, 1958
Paladin questions the motives of a landowner (Herbert Rudley) who wants him to stop the construction of a dam. Featuring Victor McLaglen and Christine White.
26	26	"Birds of a Feather"	Andrew V. McLaglen	Story by : Terence Maples; Teleplay by : Fred Eggers & Terence Maples	March 8, 1958
Paladin tries to bring peace to a divided Colorado town. Featuring James Craig, Harry Bartell, Joan Marshall and Bill Erwin.
27	27	"The Teacher"	Lamont Johnson	Sam Rolfe	March 15, 1958
Paladin comes to the defense of a teacher (Marian Seldes) who is being threatened by a local rancher. Featuring Andrew Duggan, Jack Albertson and Lana Wood.
28	28	"Killer's Widow"	Andrew V. McLaglen	Albert Aley	March 22, 1958
Although Paladin has killed a bank robber, the banker is accusing him of making off with the money. Featuring Barbara Baxley, R.G. Armstrong and Roy Barcroft.
29	29	"Gun Shy"	Lamont Johnson	Story by : Frank Hursley & Doris Hursley; Teleplay by : Frank Hursley & Doris Hursley & Albert Aley	March 29, 1958
A girl (Lisa Gaye) distracts Paladin from pursuing bandits. Featuring Jeanette Nolan and Dan Blocker.
30	30	"The Prizefight Story"	Andrew V. McLaglen	Ken Kolb	April 5, 1958
Paladin winds up a participant in a prizefight he planned to promote – against the British champ. Featuring Don Megowan, George E. Stone, Gage Clarke and King Calder.
31	31	"Hey Boy's Revenge"	Lewis Milestone	Albert Aley	April 12, 1958
Paladin's favorite hotel employee Hey Boy (series regular Kam Tong) is put in jail for trying to avenge the death of his brother (Philip Ahn). Featuring Lisa Lu, Spencer Chan, Olan Soule and Pernell Roberts. In 1997, TV Guide ranked this episode #83 on its list of the 100 Greatest Episodes.
32	32	"The Five Books of Owen Deaver"	Lamont Johnson	Sam Rolfe	April 26, 1958
Sheriff Owen Deaver (James Olson) brings his Philadelphia brand of justice to a Wyoming town, prompting Paladin to action as a favor to an old friend. Featuring Lurene Tuttle and Walter Barnes.
33	33	"The Silver Queen"	Lamont Johnson	Albert Aley	May 3, 1958
A prospector (Earle Hodgins) is not happy that a showgirl (Lita Milan) has inherited a fortune in his partner's will. Featuring Whit Bissell and Ralph Moody.
34	34	"Three Sons"	Andrew V. McLaglen	Ken Kolb	May 10, 1958
Paladin tries to warn a man (Parker Fennelly) about his stepsons' (Warren Oates, Kevin Hagen, Paul Jasmin) plot to murder him.
35	35	"The Return of Dr. Thackeray"	Andrew V. McLaglen	Story by : Stanley H. Silverman; Teleplay by : Stanley H. Silverman & Sam Rolfe	May 17, 1958
Dr. Thackeray (June Lockhart) needs Paladin's help when a rancher refuses to let her vaccinate his men for smallpox. Featuring John Anderson, Grant Withers and Charles Aidman.
36	36	"24 Hours at North Fork"	Andrew V. McLaglen	Irving Rubine	May 24, 1958
Paladin aids a Mennonite (Morris Ankrum) in protecting his farm from the town boss. Featuring Jacqueline Scott, Harry Shannon, Brad Dexter, Karl Swenson and Adeline De Walt Reynolds.
37	37	"Silver Convoy"	Lamont Johnson	Ken Kolb	May 31, 1958
Paladin discovers that the silver he agreed to escort came from a mine where prison labor is taking place. Featuring Nico Minardos, BarBara Luna, George Keymas and Rodolfo Hoyos Jr.
38	38	"Deliver the Body"	Lamont Johnson	Buckley Angell	June 7, 1958
Just as a man named Ben Tyler is acquitted of murder, he is accused of killing a sheriff. Featuring R.G. Armstrong, James Franciscus and Len Lesser.
39	39	"The Statue of San Sebastian"	Andrew V. McLaglen	Albert Aley	June 14, 1958
Paladin is offered an unusual reward for the capture of the bandit Sancho Fernandez (Simon Oakland). Featuring John Carradine and Judson Pratt.

=== Season 2 (1958–59) ===
No. overall	No. in season	Title	Directed by	Written by	Original release date
40	1	"The Manhunter"	Buzz Kulik	Harry Julian Fink	September 13, 1958
After Paladin shoots a killer in self-defense, he not only has to face an inquest, but also the man's three vengeful brothers (Martin Balsam, Hampton Fancher and Joseph V. Perry). Featuring Joseph Calleia.
41	2	"In an Evil Time"	Andrew V. McLaglen	Shimon Wincelberg	September 20, 1958
An aging bank robber must choose between his ex-partners and the law. Featuring Hank Patterson and Charles Horvath.
42	3	"The Man Who Wouldn't Talk"	Andrew V. McLaglen	Fanya Lawrence	September 27, 1958
A tough rancher (Charles Bronson) tries to woo his attractive neighbor. Featuring Harry Carey Jr. and Celia Lovsky.
43	4	"The Hanging of Roy Carter"	Andrew V. McLaglen	Gene Roddenberry	October 4, 1958
Paladin races to save a convicted killer named Roy Carter (Scott Marlowe) from a lynching when he finds proof of his innocence. Featuring Paul Birch, John Larch and Robert Armstrong.
44	5	"Duel at Florence"	Andrew V. McLaglen	Bruce Geller	October 11, 1958
Paladin plans to make a timid barber (Dean Harens) a hero when the barber's girlfriend starts a gunfight to make him jealous. Featuring Charles H. Gray.
45	6	"The Protege"	Andrew V. McLaglen	Frank D. Gilroy	October 18, 1958
Paladin discovers that the shy young man (Peter Breck) he taught to shoot is now a ruthless gunfighter. Featuring Mel Welles and George Mitchell.
46	7	"The Road to Wickenburg"	Andrew V. McLaglen	Gene Roddenberry	October 25, 1958
Paladin clashes with a corrupt sheriff (Harry Carey Jr.) and his four brothers. Featuring Don "Red" Barry, Michael Forest, Rayford Barnes, Edward Faulkner and Christine White.
47	8	"A Sense of Justice"	Lamont Johnson	John Neubuhl	November 1, 1958
Paladin believes the sheriff's daughter is responsible for the formation of a lynch mob. Featuring Virginia Gregg, Karl Swenson and Bing Russell.
48	9	"Young Gun"	Lamont Johnson	Albert Aley	November 8, 1958
Ranchers ask Paladin for help them when a gunfighter refuses to give their cattle water rights. Featuring Robert F. Simon, Meg Wyllie and Dick Foran.
49	10	"The Lady"	Andrew V. McLaglen	Shimon Wincelberg	November 15, 1958
Paladin and a woman named Diana Coulter (Patricia Medina) arrive at her brother's ranch to learn that Comanches have gotten there first.
50	11	"A Snare for Murder"	Buzz Kulik	Russell S. Hughes & Don Ingalls	November 22, 1958
Paladin pursues a gunman who is targeting his partner in a gold mine. Featuring Harry Morgan and Harry Bartell.
51	12	"The Ballad of Oscar Wilde"	Richard Whorf	Irving Wallace	December 6, 1958
A writer named Oscar Wilde (John O'Malley) hires Paladin to be his bodyguard.
52	13	"The Solid Gold Patrol"	Andrew V. McLaglen	Irving Wallace	December 13, 1958
Paladin helps an Army corporal (Sean McClory) face an ambush of Apaches so the corporal can collect his lottery prize. Featuring Eddie Little Sky.
53	14	"Something to Live For"	Andrew V. McLaglen	Story by : John Tucker Battle; Teleplay by : John Tucker Battle & Don Ingalls	December 20, 1958
On the way to get one job done, Paladin finds himself another – helping an alcoholic (Rayford Barnes).
54	15	"The Moor's Revenge"	Andrew V. McLaglen	Melvin Levy	December 27, 1958
A Shakespearean troupe (Vincent Price, Patricia Morison) may need Paladin to protect them. Featuring Morey Amsterdam.
55	16	"The Wager"	Andrew V. McLaglen	Denis Sanders & Terry Sanders	January 3, 1959
A man named Sid Morgan (Denver Pyle), whom an outlaw has threatened, hires Paladin to take him and his fiancée to Silver City.
56	17	"The Taffeta Mayor"	Andrew V. McLaglen	Albert Aley	January 10, 1959
Paladin convinces a widow (Norma Crane) to run for mayor when her husband is killed looking to get the job. Featuring Edward Platt. Note: Paladin mentions that ". . the Wyoming territorial legislature granted woman suffrage several years ago. ." That happened on December 10, 1869, so this episode is set in the early 1870s.
57	18	"Lady on the Stagecoach"	Richard Whorf	Story by : Guy de Maupassant	January 17, 1959
A band of outlaws hold up a stagecoach carrying Paladin and an Apache princess (Vitina Marcus). Featuring John Doucette.
58	19	"Treasure Trail"	Richard Whorf	Albert Aley	January 24, 1959
Paladin wins a piece of a treasure map in a poker game, only to learn that the treasure was stolen from the Army. Featuring Harry Dean Stanton, Bruce Gordon, Peter Adams and Willard Sage.
59	20	"Juliet"	Andrew V. McLaglen	Gene Roddenberry	January 31, 1959
Paladin is caught up in a feud stemming from the Civil War. Featuring Earle Hodgins, John Berardino, Allen Case and Tex Terry.
60	21	"Hunt the Man Down"	Andrew V. McLaglen	Harry Julian Fink	February 7, 1959
Paladin tries to end a feud over a woman (Madlyn Rhue) between two brothers (Robert J. Wilke and James Drury) -- both good friends of his from his Civil War days -- only to wind up in the middle of it.
61	22	"The Scorched Feather"	Andrew V. McLaglen	Bruce Geller	February 14, 1959
Paladin deals with a schizophrenic who hired him to arrest him. Featuring Lon Chaney Jr.
62	23	"The Return of the Lady"	Andrew V. McLaglen	Shimon Wincelberg	February 21, 1959
Diana Coulter (Patricia Medina) sends Paladin a wedding invitation, but the wedding is not what it seems. With Gene Nelson and Theodore Marcuse.
63	24	"The Monster of Moon Ridge"	Paul Stanley	Gene Roddenberry	February 28, 1959
Paladin is accompanied by his client's daughter in his search for a "monster". Featuring Barney Phillips, Natalie Norwick, Shirley O'Hara, Walter Coy, Robert Fortier and Ralph Moody.
64	25	"The Long Hunt"	Andrew V. McLaglen	Harry Julian Fink	March 7, 1959
Paladin is hired to catch a killer – using the killer's wife (Anne Barton) as bait. Featuring Anthony Caruso, and Lane Bradford.
65	26	"Death of a Gunfighter"	Richard Whorf	Harry Julian Fink	March 14, 1959
Paladin gets involved with a former gunman's attempts to return to his native village. Featuring Suzanne Pleshette, Christopher Dark and Russell Arms.
66	27	"Incident at Borrasca Bend"	Andrew V. McLaglen	Jay Simms	March 21, 1959
Paladin is accused of murder in a strange town where he is forced to stand trial in a kangaroo court. Featuring Jacques Aubuchon, Perry Cook and Ben Wright.
67	28	"Maggie O'Bannion"	Andrew V. McLaglen	Gene Roddenberry	April 4, 1959
A woman named Maggie O'Bannion (Marion Marshall) takes a liking to Paladin as he tries to help her save her ranch. Featuring Peggy Rea and Don Haggerty.
68	29	"The Chase"	Lamont Johnson	Fred Freiberger	April 11, 1959
A woman named Helen Martin (Olive Sturgess) hires Paladin to clear her husband of murder. Featuring Paul Richards, Paul Birch and Lee Farr.
69	30	"Alaska"	Andrew V. McLaglen	Albert Aley	April 18, 1959
Paladin travels to Alaska to help his fur-trapper friend (Karl Swenson) settle a claim dispute.
70	31	"The Man Who Lost"	Ida Lupino	Harry Julian Fink	April 25, 1959
The Gage brothers (Jack Elam, Ed Nelson) hire Paladin to find the man who killed their sister's husband. Featuring Mort Mills, Rodolfo Acosta, Barbara Hayden and Marilyn Hanold.
71	32	"The Return of Roy Carter"	Andrew V. McLaglen	Gene Roddenberry	May 2, 1959
Roy Carter (Clu Gulager), whom Paladin got off the hook for murder (Ep 2.4), hires him to save a snowbound prison chaplain who once saved his life. Note: Roy Carter is played by a different actor in this episode.
72	33	"The Sons of Aaron Murdock"	Andrew V. McLaglen	Harold Jack Bloom	May 9, 1959
Paladin is the only one who believes Aaron Murdock (Philip Coolidge), a man who insists that his son (Lee Kinsolving) is innocent of murder. Featuring Frank Gorshin.
73	34	"Comanche"	Andrew V. McLaglen	Irving Wallace	May 16, 1959
Paladin looks for an Army deserter who ran off with his sweetheart. Featuring Susan Cabot, Roy Barcroft and Larry Pennell. Note: This episode's final scene is set at the immediate aftermath of the Battle of the Little Bighorn, giving it a date of June 26 or 27, 1876 (it's unclear if they came upon it immediately afterwards or on the next day)
74	35	"Homecoming"	Andrew V. McLaglen	Albert Aley	May 23, 1959
Paladin finds out that his client's false testimony sent an innocent man to prison. Featuring Ed Nelson and Don Megowan.
75	36	"The Fifth Man"	Richard Whorf	Gene L. Coon	May 30, 1959
When four out of five men who were hired to lynch a murderer named Bert Talman (Leo Gordon) are themselves killed, Paladin is hired to protect the fifth. Featuring John Emery and Walter Burke.
76	37	"Heritage of Anger"	Lamont Johnson	Leonard Heideman	June 6, 1959
Paladin must find out why a bandit named Garcia is bothering the Avery family. Featuring Carol Thurston.
77	38	"The Haunted Trees"	Andrew V. McLaglen	Kay Lenard & Jess Carneol	June 13, 1959
A widow (Doris Dowling) asks Paladin to protect her from her stepson, whom she says is threatening her business and her life. Featuring Burt Metcalfe.
78	39	"Gold and Brimstone"	Richard Whorf	Bruce Geller	June 20, 1959
Claim jumpers clash with gold miners. Featuring Eduardo Ciannelli, Phillip Pine and Alan Reed.

=== Season 3 (1959–60) ===
No. overall	No. in season	Title	Directed by	Written by	Original release date
79	1	"First, Catch a Tiger"	Ida Lupino	Harry Julian Fink	September 12, 1959
Paladin has to figure out which one of four men wants to kill him. Featuring John Anderson.
80	2	"Episode in Laredo"	Buzz Kulik	Gene Roddenberry	September 19, 1959
A gunman runs afoul of Paladin while in town to see his wife and son. Featuring J. Pat O'Malley and Gene Lyons.
81	3	"Les Girls"	Andrew V. McLaglen	Gene Roddenberry	September 26, 1959
Paladin must deliver mail-order brides to their respective husbands. Featuring Mabel Albertson, Helene Stanley, Roxane Berard and Danielle De Metz.
82	4	"The Posse"	Andrew V. McLaglen	Gene Roddenberry	October 3, 1959
A drifter named Dobie O'Brien says that Paladin is the killer a posse is seeking to lynch. Featuring Denver Pyle and Harry Carey Jr.
83	5	"Shot by Request"	Buzz Kulik	Story by : Howard Seay; Teleplay by : Frank R. Pierson	October 10, 1959
An educated gunfighter intends to lose a duel with Paladin in order to retire with honor. Stars John Abbott, Malcolm Atterbury, Robert Gist and Sue Randall.
84	6	"Pancho"	Andrew V. McLaglen	Shimon Wincelberg	October 24, 1959
Paladin is surprised that his client wants a youth buried alive in an anthill. Stars Rafael Campos, Lisa Montell and Edward Colmans. Note: based on Doroteo likely being in his late teens (according to dialog) this episode is set around 1895.
85	7	"Fragile"	Andrew V. McLaglen	Story by : Frank R. Pierson; Teleplay by : Shimon Wincelberg	October 31, 1959
Paladin is hired by a restaurant owner (Werner Klemperer) in a mining town to protect & deliver a plate-glass window. Featuring Jacqueline Scott and Alan Caillou.
86	8	"The Unforgiven"	Andrew V. McLaglen	Jay Simms	November 7, 1959
A dying general (David White) requests that Paladin deliver a message of forgiveness to an old enemy.
87	9	"The Black Handkerchief"	Andrew V. McLaglen	Jay Simms	November 14, 1959
A black handkerchief proves to be important when Paladin tries to clear a young man convicted of murder. Featuring Ed Nelson and Joseph V. Perry.
88	10	"The Golden Toad"	Andrew V. McLaglen	Gene Roddenberry	November 21, 1959
A homesteader (David White) and a female rancher (Lorna Thayer) become consumed with greed when they hear rumors of a buried treasure.
89	11	"Tiger"	Don Taylor	Gene Roddenberry	November 28, 1959
Paladin is hired to protect a hunter from a curse. Featuring Elsa Cárdenas and Parley Baer.
90	12	"Champaigne Safari"	Andrew V. McLaglen	Story by : Whitfield Cook; Teleplay by : Frank R. Pierson & Whitfield Cook	December 5, 1959
A fake Indian attack starts to become real. Featuring Valerie French, Patric Knowles and Gilman Rankin.
91	13	"Charley Red Dog"	Ida Lupino	Gene Roddenberry	December 12, 1959
An Indian claiming to be a U.S. marshal helps Paladin rid a town of outlaws. Featuring Scott Marlowe, Raymond Bailey and Cyril Delevanti.
92	14	"The Naked Gun"	Andrew V. McLaglen	Jay Simms	December 19, 1959
Just as Paladin needs his rest, a town boss challenges him to a fight. Stars Ken Curtis and Robert J. Wilke.
93	15	"One Came Back"	Don Taylor	Bruce Geller	December 26, 1959
A former prisoner (George Mathews) is hoping to start a new life. Featuring Strother Martin and James Coburn.
94	16	"The Prophet"	Andrew V. McLaglen	Shimon Wincelberg	January 2, 1960
Paladin crosses Apache territory to find an Army deserter (Shepperd Strudwick) suspected of starting an Indian attack. Featuring Lorna Thayer and Barney Phillips.
95	17	"Day of the Badman"	Ida Lupino	Robert E. Thompson	January 9, 1960
A woman named Cynthia Palmer (Eleanor Audley) wants Paladin to rid a town of troublemakers and send her meek son (William Joyce) back East. Featuring Sue Randall.
96	18	"The Pledge"	Andrew V. McLaglen	Shimon Wincelberg	January 16, 1960
A group of renegade Indians take a settler's wife hostage. Featuring Robert Gist and Charles H. Gray.
97	19	"Jenny"	Andrew V. McLaglen	Jack Jacobs	January 23, 1960
A girl named Jenny Lake (Ellen Clark) is faced with an unwanted suitor (Trevor Bardette) and a load of counterfeit money.
98	20	"Return to Fort Benjamin"	Andrew V. McLaglen	Robert E. Thompson	January 30, 1960
Paladin has to prove a Sioux chief's (Whitehorse) son innocence before the young Indian is hanged for murder. Featuring Anthony Caruso, Charles Aidman and Robert J. Wilke.
99	21	"The Night the Town Died"	Richard Boone	Story by : Calvin Clements; Teleplay by : Calvin Clements & Frank R. Pierson	February 6, 1960
Paladin attempts to prevent a released Army prisoner Barry Cahill from avenging his brother's lynching. Featuring Robert J. Stevenson, Arthur Space, Vic Perrin and Barney Phillips.
100	22	"The Ledge"	Andrew V. McLaglen	Story by : Joel Kane & Robert Gottlieb; Teleplay by : Frank R. Pierson & Joel Kane & Robert Gottlieb	February 13, 1960
One of five men has to risk his life to see if a man stuck on a ledge is still alive. Featuring John Hoyt, Richard Rust and Don Beddoe.
101	23	"The Lady on the Wall"	Ida Lupino	Charles Beaumont & Richard Matheson	February 20, 1960
A group of miners want Paladin to find a missing painting of an attractive woman. Featuring Lillian Bronson, Howard Petrie, Ralph Clanton and Ralph Moody.
102	24	"The Misguided Father"	Andrew V. McLaglen	Donn Mullally	February 27, 1960
Paladin heads to timber country in order to avenge a friend's murder. Featuring Douglas Kennedy, Hampton Fancher, Harry Carey, Jr., Gregg Palmer and Eugene Borden.
103	25	"The Hatchet Man"	Andrew V. McLaglen	Shimon Wincelberg	March 5, 1960
The Chinese code of honor makes it difficult for Paladin to protect a Chinese police detective named Joe Tsin (Benson Fong). Featuring Lisa Lu, Philip Ahn, Nolan Leary, Allen Jung and James B. Leong.
104	26	"Fight at Adobe Wells"	Richard Boone	Story by : Samuel A. Peeples; Teleplay by : Frank R. Pierson & Samuel A. Peeples	March 12, 1960
Quanah Parker and a small band of Comanches trap Paladin and several other people in a burnt out stagecoach station. Featuring Ken Lynch and Sandy Kenyon. Note: Although this is a completely fictional story, Quanah Parker was involved in the Second Battle of Adobe Walls (not wells), which has no similarity except the close resemblance of the name.
105	27	"The Gladiators"	Alvin Ganzer	Robert C. Dennis	March 19, 1960
Paladin and a professional gunfighter (James Coburn) are duped into replacing two duelists in a New Orleans affair of honor. Featuring Paul Cavanagh and Dolores Donlon.
106	28	"Love of a Bad Woman"	Andrew V. McLaglen	Robert Dozier	March 26, 1960
A woman named Tamsen Sommers (Geraldine Brooks) says she is a husband-hunting widow, which proves to be contradicted by her very-much-alive spouse (Lawrence Dobkin).
107	29	"An International Affair"	James Neilson	Shimon Wincelberg & Anita Wincelberg	April 2, 1960
A Hawaiian prince is murdered on Paladin's doorstep. Featuring Ziva Rodann, Henry Corden and Oscar Beregi Jr.
108	30	"Lady with a Gun"	Ida Lupino	Archie L. Tegland	April 9, 1960
Paladin goes after a gunslinging woman (Paula Raymond) seeking to avenge her brother's murder in the Civil War. Featuring Jack Weston.
109	31	"Never Help the Devil"	Andrew V. McLaglen	Archie L. Tegland	April 16, 1960
Paladin attempts to protect a wounded gunman (Jack Lambert) from a victim's vengeful brother.
110	32	"Ambush"	Richard Boone	Robert E. Thompson	April 23, 1960
Paladin, along with others, must find out why a gunman is holding them hostage. Featuring George Macready.
111	33	"Black Sheep"	Richard Boone	Shimon Wincelberg	April 30, 1960
Paladin travels South of the Border to find an heir named Ben Huttner (Patrick Wayne) who's wanted for murder. Featuring Stacy Harris and Suzanne Lloyd.
112	34	"Full Circle"	Fred Hartsook	David Lang	May 14, 1960
A man named Simon Quill (Adam Williams), who once left Paladin to die, is about to be hanged – and only Paladin can save him. Featuring Barbara Baxley, Raymond Hatton and Hal Needham. Note: This episode occurs three years after September 14, 1872, the date the woman Quill is accused of murdering was killed, and the same month and year when Quill abandoned Paladin, leaving him to die in Buffalo ND.
113	35	"The Twins"	Andrew V. McLaglen	Robert James	May 21, 1960
A man named Adam Mirakian (Brian G. Hutton) is arrested for murder, but insists his twin brother is the real killer.
114	36	"The Campaign of Billy Banjo"	Richard Boone	Frank R. Pierson & Richard Baer	May 28, 1960
A politician wants Paladin to keep an eye on his wife. Featuring Jacques Aubuchon and Vic Perrin.
115	37	"Ransom"	Richard Boone	Robert E. Thompson	June 4, 1960
Paladin looks all over Mexico for a man who once served the emperor, but he's not the only one searching for the man. Featuring Valerie French, Alexander Davion, Robert H. Harris, Gene Roth and Denver Pyle.
116	38	"The Trial"	Ida Lupino	Robert E. Thompson	June 11, 1960
A man named Morgan Gibbs (Robert F. Simon) hires Paladin to bring back his son – a killer – alive. Featuring Hal Smith, James Bell and Raymond Hatton.
117	39	"The Search"	Richard Boone	Story by : Sloan Nibley; Teleplay by : Sloan Nibley & Frank R. Pierson	June 18, 1960
A woman's son has been missing for twenty years and she wants Paladin to find him. Featuring Wright King, Charles Aidman, Lillian Bronson, Peggy Rea, Earle Hodgins and Ted Markland.

=== Season 4 (1960–61) ===
No. overall	No. in season	Title	Directed by	Written by	Original release date
118	1	"The Fatalist"	Buzz Kulik	Shimon Wincelberg	September 10, 1960
An immigrant named Nathan Shotness (Martin Gabel) witnesses a murder – and may be the next victim. Featuring Robert Blake.
119	2	"Love's Young Dream"	Andrew V. McLaglen	Jay Simms	September 17, 1960
Paladin tries to find the perfect woman for a trail bum who has inherited half a gambling house. Featuring Ken Curtis and Lorna Thayer.
120	3	"A Head of Hair"	Andrew V. McLaglen	Harry Julian Fink	September 24, 1960
Paladin needs help looking for kidnappers. Featuring Ben Johnson and George Kennedy. Lisa Lu first appears here as Hey Girl (an identical role to Kam Tong's Hey Boy), she makes numerous appearances in Season 4 as Tong's temporary fill-in/replacement.
121	4	"Out at the Old Ballpark"	Richard Boone	Frank R. Pierson	October 1, 1960
Paladin becomes umpire at a baseball game where guns are being used as much as bats. Featuring J. Pat O'Malley and Jack Albertson.
122	5	"Saturday Night"	Buzz Kulik	Jack Curtis	October 8, 1960
Paladin winds up in the town of a corrupt sheriff (Martin Balsam), in jail after getting into a brawl, and in a cell embroiled in a murder mystery.
123	6	"The Calf"	Richard Boone	Howard Rodman	October 15, 1960
A ranch owner has been driven nearly insane by a kink in a fence (he and his now deceased brother built the fence starting from different ends to divide their properties) which he wants perfectly straight. Featuring Denver Pyle, Parker Fennelly and Don Grady.
124	7	"The Tender Gun"	Andrew V. McLaglen	Jay Simms	October 22, 1960
Sheriff Maude J. Smuggly (Jeanette Nolan) needs Paladin's help with facing landgrabbers. Featuring Lou Antonio.
125	8	"The Shooting of Jessie May"	Richard Boone	Harry Julian Fink	October 29, 1960
A man named Jessie May Robert Blake sets out to avenge his father's death. Featuring William Talman, Hari Rhodes, Rayford Barnes, John Milford and Barney Phillips.
126	9	"The Poker Fiend"	Byron Paul	Richard Adams	November 12, 1960
A woman (Betsy Jones-Moreland) offers to pay Paladin $50,000 if he can get her husband (Jack Weston) out of a marathon poker game. Featuring Peter Falk, Brett Somers and Warren Oates.
127	10	"Crowbait"	Buzz Kulik	Shimon Wincelberg	November 19, 1960
A group of Paiutes target a prospector who's digging ore from an Indian silver mine. Featuring Russell Collins and Jacqueline Scott.
128	11	"The Marshal's Boy"	Richard Boone	Robert James	November 26, 1960
A marshal (Ken Lynch) is forced to hunt down his own son (Andrew Prine) wanted for murder. Featuring Hal Smith and Harry Carey Jr.
129	12	"Foggbound"	Andrew V. McLaglen	Shimon Wincelberg; Based on the novel "Around the World in 80 Days" by: Jules Verne	December 3, 1960
Paladin assists traveler Phileas Fogg (Patric Knowles) on his 80-day trip around the world as people have been engaged to slow down Fogg so he loses his wager. Featuring Peter Whitney.
130	13	"The Legacy"	Andrew V. McLaglen	Robert E. Thompson	December 10, 1960
Paladin joins a posse to capture a wanted killer (George Kennedy), but his tables are turned when the dying killer bequeaths his fortune to any man present who kills Paladin. Featuring Roy Barcroft, Harry Carey Jr., Chuck Roberson and Harry Lauter.
131	14	"The Prisoner"	Buzz Kulik	Robert E. Thompson	December 17, 1960
A judge is about to release Justin Groton (Buzz Martin), a man who's been in prison awaiting execution since he was thirteen years old. Featuring Barry Kelley and George Mitchell.
132	15	"The Mountebank" "The Puppeteer"	Richard Boone	Shimon Wincelberg	December 24, 1960
A puppeteer's fury ruins his performance and puts his life in danger. Featuring Crahan Denton, Natalie Norwick and Denver Pyle.
133	16	"Sanctuary" "Vernon Good"	Buzz Kulik	Robert C. Dennis	December 31, 1960
While in a mission, Paladin finds a man who's being sought by gunslingers. Featuring Albert Salmi, Leo Gordon and Oscar Berengi Jr.
134	17	"A Quiet Night in Town"	Buzz Kulik	Harry Julian Fink	January 7, 1961
135	18	"A Quiet Night in Town"	Buzz Kulik	Harry Julian Fink	January 14, 1961
Paladin escorts a sheepherder suspected of murder to a town full of cattlemen who decide that the sheepherder Paladin brought to them should be hanged. Featuring James Best, Sydney Pollack, Robert Emhardt, Phyllis Love and Robert Carricart.
136	19	"The Princess and the Gunfighter"	Richard Boone	Robert E. Thompson	January 21, 1961
Paladin looks for Princess Sarafina (Arlene Martel). Featuring Ben Wright and Shirley O'Hara.
137	20	"Shadow of a Man"	Andrew V. McLaglen	Jack Laird	January 28, 1961
A woman named Marion Sutter (Dianne Foster) begs Paladin to rescue her Southern husband (Kent Smith) from a rebel hater. Featuring Walter Burke and Mike Kellin.
138	21	"Long Way Home"	Andrew V. McLaglen	Shimon Wincelberg	February 4, 1961
Paladin has to protect his $5,000 prisoner (Ivan Dixon) from a group of bounty hunters looking to collect the reward.
139	22	"The Tax Gatherer"	Richard Boone	Robert E. Thompson	February 11, 1961
Paladin is hired as a tax collector in a town where the last three tax collectors were killed on the job. Featuring Roy Barcroft and Harry Carey Jr.
140	23	"The Fatal Flaw"	Andrew V. McLaglen	Jack Laird	February 25, 1961
With a blizzard raging on, Paladin shares a cabin with marshal and his prisoner, who's trying to talk his way to freedom. Featuring Royal Dano, Allyn Joslyn and Jena Engstrom.
141	24	"Fandango"	Richard Boone	Harry Julian Fink	March 4, 1961
A condemned killer runs into Paladin while trying to make a break for freedom. Featuring Robert Gist, Andrew Prine, Karl Swenson and Rodolfo Acosta.
142	25	"The Last Judgment"	Gerald Mayer	Shimon Wincelberg	March 11, 1961
Paladin deals with a judge (Harold J. Stone) who holds court in a saloon and only sentences defendants to be hanged. Featuring Leo Gordon and Donald Randolph.
143	26	"The Gold Bar"	Ida Lupino	Robert E. Thompson	March 18, 1961
Paladin is hired to retrieve a stolen gold bar before the bank is inspected Monday morning. Featuring John Fiedler, Jena Engstrom and Val Avery.
144	27	"Everyman"	Byron Paul	Richard Adams	March 25, 1961
A ne'er-do-well must save Paladin before a killer ends him. Featuring Barry Kelley, David White, Vic Perrin, June Vincent and Roy Engel.
145	28	"The Siege"	Andrew V. McLaglen	Jack Curtis	April 1, 1961
As the jail door has yet to arrive, Paladin volunteers to keep guard on Bobby Joe, one of three brothers who comprise a gang attempting to extort money from farmers on threat of poisoning their wells with arsenic. Featuring David J. Stewart and Perry Lopez.
146	29	"The Long Weekend"	Byron Paul	Jack Laird	April 8, 1961
Every six months, silver miner Shep Montrose comes to town for the weekend, spends large and causes a huge amount of damage. The townsfolk like Shep and do not want him hurt so Paladin is hired to prevent the damage. Featuring Roy Barcroft and Ralph Moody.
147	30	"El Paso Stage"	Robert Butler	Gene Roddenberry	April 15, 1961
Paladin clashes with a crooked lawman (Buddy Ebsen). Featuring Karl Swenson and Jeremy Slate.
148	31	"Duke of Texas"	Buzz Kulik	Story by : Albert Aley; Teleplay by : Albert Aley & Albert Ruben	April 22, 1961
Paladin is astonished that an Austrian prince (Scott Marlowe) wants him to lead a Mexican invasion. Featuring Eduard Franz and Robert Carricart.
149	32	"Broken Image"	Richard Boone	Lou Shaw & Peggy Shaw	April 29, 1961
A sharpshooter (Kenneth Tobey) with a big reputation is oddly reluctant to use his gun.
150	33	"My Brother's Keeper"	Andrew V. McLaglen	Jay Simms	May 6, 1961
After he has been attacked by a mountain lion, two men find Paladin presumably mortally wounded and they steal his horse, money ($2000) and guns and leave him to die. Featuring Wright King, Betsy Jones-Moreland, Ed Nelson, Karl Swenson and Ben Wright.
151	34	"Bearbait"	Andrew V. McLaglen	Robert E. Thompson	May 13, 1961
Instead of bullets, Paladin uses insults against thugs who are terrorizing a town. Featuring Judi Meredith, Richard Rust, Martin West, Ollie O'Toole and Frank Ferguson.
152	35	"The Cure"	Buzz Kulik	Shimon Wincelberg	May 20, 1961
Paladin finds a drunken and disheveled Calamity Jane (Norma Crane), a woman he admires and upon whom he emulated some of his gun skills, passed out in his hotel's lobby.
153	36	"The Road"	Andrew V. McLaglen	Frank R. Pierson	May 27, 1961
After getting robbed at a trail-side inn, Paladin is forced to cross a mountain on foot without food. Featuring Trevor Bardette, Gene Lyons and George Kennedy.
154	37	"The Uneasy Grave"	Andrew V. McLaglen	Jack Curtis	June 3, 1961
Outside of town Paladin meets a woman, Kathy (Pippa Scott), burying her murdered fiancé after she has been run out of town for the murder. Featuring Lillian Bronson and Don Beddoe.
155	38	"Soledad Crossing"	Andrew V. McLaglen	Don Ingalls	June 10, 1961
While escorting a prisoner to Soledad, Paladin is stopped at a ford by a bridge by armed men telling them not to cross due to a diphtheria scare involving the prisoner's brother. Featuring Edward Faulkner, Ken Curtis, Natalie Norwick and Walker Edmiston.

=== Season 5 (1961–62) ===
No. overall	No. in season	Title	Directed by	Written by	Original release date
156	1	"The Vigil"	Andrew V. McLaglen	Shimon Wincelberg	September 16, 1961
A nurse pays Paladin to escort her to a gold field without a doctor. On the way they meet two men raising a cairn over a third man's body, claiming the corpse is that of their friend who was shot in the back with an arrow by Native Americans. When the younger man raises a knife to Paladin, Paladin shoots him in the arm who is tended by the nurse. Later, the older man threatens Paladin with a stick but backs down. The next day the younger man pockets his knife and threatens to slit the nurse's throat and in a scuffle the older man obtains Paladin's revolver. The pair of men go to escape but the younger one wants to rape the nurse. Just before he is shot, Paladin kills the older man with his derringer and the younger one begs the nurse not to let Paladin have him. Paladin and the nurse set out to the gold field with the younger man in tow as a prisoner.
157	2	"The Education of Sara Jane"	Richard Boone	Betty Andrews)	September 23, 1961
Paladin finds a bloodstained riderless horse. Following its tracks he comes across the corpse of its rider, father of young woman Sara Jane Darrow who holds Paladin at gunpoint before being disarmed by him. The pair are shot at by Carter Tyler (Duane Eddy), the young man who had shot Mr Darrow as part of a long running family feud. Paladin captures him and intends to take him to town for trial. Eventually Sara Jane is persuaded by Paladin to forgive Carter, figuring that too many have died over the generations, just as other members of the Tyler family come to find Carter so Paladin releases him.
158	3	"The Revenger"	Andrew V. McLaglen	Robert E. Thompson	September 30, 1961
Paladin is given half of a $500 bill, a stage ticket from a small town to Yuma and a promise to receive the other half of the bill in payment. Waiting for the stagecoach, Paladin meets five other travellers (sheriff and his prisoner; retired insurance salesman; former army officer and his wife). During the trip, a Mexican bandit named Solomon stops the coach to find a man who killed the wife of Miguel, one of Solomon's friends. The sheriff overreacts and shoots unarmed Miguel dead and is killed by Solomon. With Miquel dead and unable to identify the murderer, Solomon demands Paladin choose someone to kill.
159	4	"Odds for Big Red"	Richard Donner	Betty Andrews	October 7, 1961
A multiple murderer hides behind a woman in a saloon. He is shot by Paladin. The saloon's owner, a woman called "Big Red", catches a stray shot from the murderer and is mortally wounded. With the doctor out of town Paladin takes charge of her while some of the townsmen, including her ex-boyfriend Guy who acts as the bank, make wagers on her dying before sunrise. Paladin wagers $1000 at 5-to-1 odds that she will survive. Paladin questions Guy and learns he studied to be a doctor, though never practised, and was using his education to make a prognosis to work out which side to bet on. Paladin threatens him with a new wager: Guy dies too if Red dies. Guy says if the surgery succeeds the men who lose money will probably kill him; Paladin says, "The difference is probably, you can be absolutely certain of me." The men find out about the surgery and one drunk tries to stop it. Guy tells Red he does not want her to die. The surgery is successful and Red tells Guy he was always a rotten gambler, including betting against himself, and that to pay off his wager he'll have to take up work as a doctor. He acquiesces and the pair kiss.
160	5	"A Proof of Love"	Richard Boone	Lou Shaw & Peggy Shaw	October 14, 1961
Gun-inept farmer Henry Gray (Charles Bronson) seeks a mail order bride. He asks Paladin to teach him to gunfight so he can recover $300 from his neighbor, Rud Saxon (George Kennedy). At Rud's house, Calliope (Chana Eden), the Greek mail order bride, tells Paladin she left Henry because he and his mother are dour and banned having fun. She convinces Rud to return the money. That night a loud party goes on at Rud's barn. Paladin quotes Tennyson ("he that shuts Love out, in turn shall be // Shut out from Love") and surreptitiously asks Henry to go but Henry's mother forbids it; he sneaks out with Paladin when she is asleep. Calliope sings a song that Paladin translates that, a Greek girl left home to get married in a far away country. Paladin tells Henry that Calliope anticipates he being unable to have fun but just try to. Henry's mother arrives and Henry stands up to her. After a fist fight between Henry and Rud, and then Rud and Paladin, Calliope goes to the unconscious Henry and tells Paladin she chooses Henry. Paladin remarks it is unfortunate she lacks any sisters. Calliope replies that she has several and that Paladin does not have to go to Greece, she will bring them there.
161	6	"The Gospel Singer"	Byron Paul	Robert E. Thompson	October 21, 1961
Paladin travels to Bugbear, recently renamed Elysium, to help rid it of violence. Melissa (Suzi Carnell), a Christian missionary, joins him on her way to Bugbear and reproves him for carrying a gun. In Bugbear, Paladin's conditions are that the law-abiding folk who hired him give up their weapons just like the hooligans. He meets with more resistance, including shooting dead one of the Durbin brothers, whose fellow gang members warn of reprisal when the surviving brothers find out. Melissa gains pledges from many townsmen, including those who refused earlier to give up their revolvers. At lunch she tells Paladin their guns were given to her because of God's love, and that God has chosen him to do God's work of disarming the town. Paladin replies that in a year the townsmen will be scared by something and return to their old ways. Immediately news of the Durbin gang arriving sends the men back to their guns. Melissa stands between Paladin and the three outlaws and tries to convince them all to give up their arms; Paladin gives her his revolver. The Durbin brother shoots at Paladin; Paladin uses his two-shot derringer on him and another outlaw. The third one gets the drop on Paladin from behind but Melissa points Paladin's revolver point blank at his head. Later, when he's paid, the townsmen say Paladin should split his fee with Melissa since he could not have done it alone. Paladin replies, "since Melissa has your guns and your pledges and that's all that she asked for, I will accept your money since that's all I asked for", and he rides away.
162	7	"The Race"	Andrew V. McLaglen	Lou Shaw & Peggy Shaw	October 28, 1961
On his way to ride in a horse race Paladin intervenes in what he thinks is a fistfight between two Native Americans (but he later learns it was "training"). He learns that the race is to be between a settler, Sam Crabbe (Ben Johnson), and a Native American tribe for possession of the local land. It is to involve beating each other while riding. Paladin is to race for Crabbe; one of the men Paladin injured was to have been his opponent. Paladin wants the race delayed until a new opponent can be trained. He withdraws as it is an unjust cause (saying the Native Americans will die without the land but "the white man can live any place. You can start over if you lose, he can't"). Crabbe insists the race go ahead. Paladin attempts to persuade (with the gifting of his horse, saddle and his guns to the chief) that he will ride for them to prevent the elderly chief dying by racing in the grueling event. On the way, Native Americans and settlers both intervene--lassoing Crabbe, tripping Paladin's horse--and eventually both are dismounted and fist fight. About to win, Paladin instead helps Crabbe walk to the finish line but refuses to let either of them to cross and win saying it will change nothing. He exhorts settlers and Native Americans to work together, then he walks them across together. Crabbe asks how long until another rider can be trained. Paladin gives the chief his card then rides off.
163	8	"The Hanging of Aaron Gibbs"	Richard Boone	Robert E. Thompson	November 4, 1961
Meeting her on the trail, Paladin helps Sarah Gibbs (Odetta) travel to Dunbar, a tiny mining settlement, where her husband Aaron (Rupert Crosse) is to be hanged that afternoon with two other men for mass murder during an attempted burglary. The townsfolk, Deputy Jim Harden (Edward Faulkner) in particular whose brother died, objects that Aaron should be allowed to talk to anyone as none of the townsfolk could comfort the murdered men as they were dying. Paladin intervenes and Sarah and Aaron are allowed to talk. Aaron explains that he and his fellow thieves set explosives to block the mine entrance to delay pursuit and he did not know anyone would be injured or die. The three men are executed. Paladin condemns Harden as not much of a man. One of the townswomen offers Sarah a token of consolation by giving her shawl to cover Aaron's corpse. Paladin and Sarah ride off on her cart.
164	9	"The Piano"	Richard Donner	Barry Trivers; Based on an idea by: Frank R. Pierson	November 11, 1961
Paladin is hired to recover a stolen piano European pianist Franz Lister (Keith Andes) brought with him for a concert. A ransom has already been brokered which Paladin is to deliver but Lister insists no one should pay as the piano was a gift from a king, "you do not buy it like a harlot in a street, you fight for her like a woman you love". Paladin tries to enlist four men to help but no one is willing to risk their lives for a piano until Paladin uses word play to trick the loudest objector into saying he has a stomach for trouble. On the road, Sybil (Antoinette Bower), adult daughter of the woman for whom the concert is to be played, says she is jealous of Lister's affection for his piano. Meeting the thieves, Lister goes berserk that it is scratched and starts a fist fight. In the scuffle the piano's cart rolls down a hill and the piano is destroyed. Lister gives his concert on a tiny piano. In the audience are the rough men, now dressed up, who Paladin recruited. Backstage Sybil gives Paladin a long kiss on the lips and he declares, "I have been paid."
165	10	"Ben Jalisco"	Andrew V. McLaglen	Harry Julian Fink	November 18, 1961
Paladin learns that former bounty hunter Ben Jalisco (Charles Bronson) has murdered a guard and escaped from prison. Jalisco was in prison for having stalked his bounties like animals claiming they all had no souls so killing them was no different to killing animals or Indians who also have no souls. Paladin guards Jalisco's wife Lucy (Coleen Gray) who informs on Jalisco and who helped Paladin catch him. Jalisco murders the sheriff, Armstedder (John Litel), guarding Lucy but leaves Paladin alive so that Paladin can help him flee. He delivers long speeches to Lucy and Paladin while holding a shotgun to her head. On the trail to Mexico, Jalisco accuses Lucy of turning him in because of her feelings for Paladin which they deny. Jalisco abhors Lucy for working in a saloon which she says she had to do to eat because she was not free to marry. Two men, one a lawman, ride up and Jalisco threatens to kill Lucy to force Paladin to defend him. Paladin "shoots to wound" one man. The other wounds Jalisco who changes his mind from shooting that man to trying to shoot Lucy; Paladin shoots him as he points his shotgun at Lucy and he dies. A mourning Lucy tells Paladin she guesses she should thank him, that now she is free, that all the worse is behind her and that something good has to happen.
166	11	"The Brothers"	Andrew V. McLaglen	Robert E. Thompson	November 25, 1961
A widow seeks revenge for the murder of her husband by Bram Holden (Buddy Ebsen), who rules over a town called Thornburg. Paladin is hired. He abducts Holden, who escape attempt forces Paladin to take them into the desert on foot to avoid pursuit. With both nearly dead from dehydration. The pair are rescued by prospector "Possum" Corbin (Paul Hartman) who has poor eyesight. Despite offers of large sums of money from Paladin to take them to town, Possum explains he is intent upon seeking vengeance upon his brother, Arnie, who nine years ago stole their earnings, abducted his half-Chinook wife and left her to die in the wilderness when she fell ill. Instead Possum is going to Thornburg. Hearing this Holden wakes up and laughs at the irony. Seeing his face for the first time, Possum calls Holden Arnie. Holden insists he is not Arnie and Possum threatens torture. Paladin points out they are handcuffed together; to free Paladin Possum grabs an axe to cut off Holden's hand; Paladin intervenes; Possum ends the scuffle by shooting Holden dead. On the way to the town they are met by a man on horseback who tells them where a federal marshal can be found. Possum insists the man, who is much younger and looks and sounds nothing like Holden, is Arnie and grabs his rifle to shoot the man. Paladin asks him, "What about the body in the back of this wagon?" Possum reples, "Who? Don't you understand?" Irritatingly and knowingly, Paladin says he does.
167	12	"A Drop of Blood"	Richard Donner	Shimon Wincelberg	December 2, 1961
A long, florid telegram invites Paladin to be best man at his friend Nathan Shotness's (Martin Gabel) daughter's wedding. (Note: Nathan and his daughter appeared in Season 4's The Fatalist.) When he arrives, Nathan says the wedding has been postponed and moved to San Francisco because of Billy Buckstone (Noah Keen) who has threatened to ruin the wedding, perhaps killing Nathan or at least driving him out of town. Buckstone was sentenced to be hanged on Nathan's testimony but then released by a corrupt judge. Paladin says the wedding should be held locally and Nathan should ask his neighbors for help as he was the hero of the county for putting away Buckstone. Nathan points out the selfishness of people and that if he left his home would be burned down since they would not stop Buckstone. In town, Buckstone and his gang harass Rivka (Roxane Berard) and her hapless fiance Faivel Melamed (Mike Kellin) but Paladin intervenes. Over supper, Rivka asks Paladin to teach Faivel how to shoot. Paladin softly demurs saying such things are not for everyone. Faivel excuses himself from the table, borrows Paladin's revolver and shows himself a gun expert. The next day at the wedding the sheriff, who stays outside, takes off his gun (because it is a wedding, against Paladin's advice) and the rabbi asks Paladin (inside) to take off his. Despite the sheriff, Buckstone's gang arrives and upsets the dishes and food outside while the ceremony goes on inside. Paladin restrains Nathan until arson is involved when Paladin rushes out unarmed joined by Faival, who proves himself not hapless, and Nathan. The trio knock the gang unconscious, the wedding completes and they all celebrate.
168	13	"A Knight to Remember"	Andrew V. McLaglen	Robert Dozier	December 9, 1961
Paladin is hired to find a delusional elderly father (Hans Conried) who believes he is Don Quixote and is making a nuisance of himself. Secretly the son hopes his father will attack Paladin and be killed when Paladin defends himself. With Paladin absent for a moment the old man sparks a violent incident in a cantina; angered by this the son publicly announces a $1000 bounty for his father's death. When confronted by Paladin the son refuses to retract the bounty and grabs an axe to kill Paladin but is shot dead. Meeting the old man in the middle of a field, the old man claims he has finally slain a monster (leading Paladin to the corpse of the man from the cantina who was seeking revenge) and so is now a true knight. Paladin dubs him a knight and confesses to killing his son. The man and his daughter walk peacefully back to his house. Paladin tells the cantina owner that if anyone harms the old man he will hear about it—and he will come back.
169	14	"Blind Circle"	Richard Donner	Anthony Wilson	December 16, 1961
Two members of the Cattleman's Association (Note: One of these men, Hughes, explicitly names the current years as 1875.) ask Paladin to stop Jess Larker (Hank Patterson), a poor and now elderly man whom they have for years used as a killer to stop cattle rustling, from hunting a bounty on a man named "Cabell" that they forgot even existed. Paladin finds Larker and they stay at a boarding house Despite a no talking at supper rule, Paladin charms the hostess Emily Madison (Ellen Atterbury) and tells the other guests that Larker is a paid killer looking for someone he believes to be a fellow guest and that it would be better for the rustler to turn himself in to Paladin. In the morning, one of the guests has run off. Larker pays his own bill from a wad of cash. When asked Sarah Allyson (Susan Davis), the absent man's wife, tells Paladin to go away, she gave all their money to his friend (Larker) and that her husband was acquitted of rustling under his real name. A gun shot summons Paladin to the dining room where he finds Larker mortally shot. He does not tell Paladin who shot him but points behind Paladin to where the killer is hiding. Paladin shoots the killer (an unnamed guest, not Sarah's husband) and returns the wad of cash to Sarah, saying she paid for Larker's stay and maybe she could pay for his funeral too. As he is leaving guest Simpson says of Larker, "That's the way they live. They expect that," and Paladin pauses for a moment.
170	15	"The Kid"	Elliot Silverstein	Joanne Court	December 23, 1961
Paladin believes he is winning the workings of a "silver strike" (a mine) for a month but instead he is winning his opponent's (Jacques Aubuchon) son Silver Strike Moriarity (Flip Mark) who the gambler forces to work to earn money while he himself does nothing but drink and gamble. The opponent does not believe Paladin will take Silver, but Paladin does. Instead of making him work, Paladin forces the boy to bathe and takes him to school. The boy's father objects, starting a fist fight to keep the boy from becoming better than the father. The boy agrees to go to school, hoping to learn how to fight his father like Paladin has done, when he sees a girl who also attends.
171	16	"Squatter's Rights"	Richard Boone	Harry Julian Fink	December 30, 1961
Because he believes Costigan's (Warren Stevens) brother died in Paladin's stead and because he believes Costigan's cause is just, Paladin volunteers to help, for free, as Costigan pushes squatters off his land in Wyoming. Costigan's sense of propriety insists that he pay Paladin. (Note: During this conversation Paladin reveals he keeps five rounds in his revolver. This practice left one chamber of a six-shooter empty to keep the hammer from accidentally discharging the weapon.) Costigan orders his man Juan Quintos (Carlos Romero) to hang a squatter who has killed one of Costigan's cattle. Paladin objects, is pistol whipped from behind, and wakes to find the squatter hanged. Refusing to bow to Costigan's will Paladin drives off Costigan and his men and takes the corpse to the chief squatter Clemenceau (Robert J. Stevenson) saying he no longer works for Costigan. At night, Costigan comes to Clemenceau's house with a $1000 check for Paladin's fee, saying he honors his agreements. He will let Clemenceau's wife go free, and offers to let Paladin live too; Paladin returns the same offer to Costigan and says he will push Clemenceau off the land. In a gunfight Costigan and the only two of his many men that he brought along are killed. Paladin tells Clemenceau he will still force him to leave because Costigan was right, just wrong in his ways. In the morning Paladin surprises Clemenceau by offering him the $1000 cheque: he refuses but his wife takes it and they leave.
172	17	"Lazarus"	Albert G. Ruben	Jack Laird	January 6, 1962
Forced to stay in a small tavern due to a flooded stream, Paladin calls out the local bully "Big" Fontana (Chris Alcaide) for cheating at drinking games by using water. Fontana challenges Paladin to a gunfight but before it can take place local Boise Peabody (Strother Martin) steps in and draws against Fontana, shooting him dead. Peabody is fearless having received a prognosis that he will die before dawn. (Later Paladin discovers the man who made the prognosis is not actually a doctor.) Peabody awakens in the morning agitated that he is not dead and scared he will be killed by Big's brother "Little" Fontana (L. Q. Jones), and asks for Paladin's help. To avoid anyone coming after Peabody, including people who just want to take on the man who killed the previous tough guy, Paladin holds a funeral for Peabody but when little Fontana arrives Peabody rushes out from hiding revealing the ruse. Little Fontana challenges him to a duel knowing he is unarmed but Paladin intervenes. Fontana feigns walking away but draws and is shot dead by Paladin. Paladin and Peabody mark a fresh grave with a headstone reading "Here Lies the Man who Killed Big Fontana Born March 6, 1875 Died March 7, 1875".
173	18	"Justice in Hell"	Richard Boone	Jack Laird	January 13, 1962
A man shows Paladin a shell shocked and heavily scared girl to emotionally manipulate him into hunting Rusty Doggett (John Alderson) who slaughtered the girl's wagon train and wounded her when she was an infant. Doggett is easy to apprehend but the town is a haven for criminals and almost every man in the saloon trains his gun on Paladin. Paladin surrenders his guns but still starts a fistfight, is knocked out, and wakes to find himself the property of dandy opportunist Dallas Burchfield (William Schallert). Burchfield suggests a trial to leading townsman Teague (Alan Carney); Paladin will be hanged dead if he cannot prove Doggett is guilty. Paladin's elegant oratory tricks Doggett into incriminating himself by revealing details about the girl but Teague says he is not convinced. Inspired by Paladin's earlier approbations, Burchfield offers himself in Paladin's place saying he does not want to live in hell with filth like Doggett. Enraged, Doggett stabs Burchfield and Teague shoots Doggett dead. Paladin is allowed to leave with Burchfield.
174	19	"Mark of Cain"	Andrew V. McLaglen	Shimon Wincelberg	January 20, 1962
European phrenologist Dr. Avatar (Philip Coolidge) contacts Paladin having travelled to America to study habitual murderers whose head measurements are the proverbial "mark of Cain". In a general store Paladin identifies a wanted murderer who draws on Paladin and is shot dead. Avatar notes that Paladin attracts violence: he goads men into drawing then kills them in self defense. Paladin and Avatar arrive at the remote cabin of Jake Trueblood (Roy Barcroft), a multiple killer now elderly. Avatar takes Jake's measurements and declares he is a congenital murderer. Alone at night, Avatar offers Paladin a lot more money to collect Jake's head as proof to take back to Europe; Paladin refuses. When he sneaks in to kill and decapitate Jake himself, Avatar is caught and lies saying Paladin intends to kill Jake. Paladin is held at gunpoint by Jake but Jake says he cannot kill Paladin. Alone again, Avatar tells Paladin one man's life is a small price to pay for the advancement of science: his, Jake's or Paladin's. His first plan foiled he was hoping Jake would kill Paladin--or he could have saved himself some effort by having Paladin killed in San Francisco. Paladin measures Avatar's head and the results show Avatar has the mark of Caine. Avatar draws on Paladin. Paladin bluffs Avatar into turning his revolver away and Paladin shoots Avatar with his derringer.
175	20	"The Exiles"	Sutton Roley	Robert E. Thompson	January 27, 1962
Revolutionary Mexican Provisional General Ortega (Gerald Price) hires Paladin to recover bonds from an aristocrat (Jay Novello), the former treasurer to Maximilian I of Mexico, who fled with the French backed bonds when the emperor's regime fell, before the bonds depreciate further. Paladin meets the aristocrat and his wife (Vivi Janess) selling food they cooked on the street, compliments them on the food, then introduces himself saying he knows who they are and brokers a meeting with Ortega. The meeting goes poorly, the aristocrats say the bonds belong to the empress. At night Ortega tells Paladin he will kill the aristocrats. Paladin says Ortega can have the bonds but not the aristocrats' lives. Paladin visits the aristocrats and warns them. Before the next dawn Ortega comes for them. The countess, partly persuaded by Paladin saying the bonds will help the people, relents rather than have her husband killed and hands over the bonds. Ortega leaves with Paladin, acknowledging himself, the count and countess as having different governments but being one people.
176	21	"The Hunt"	Andrew V. McLaglen	Herman Groves	February 3, 1962
Thinking he is going to help a widow (Joan Elan) in Oregon, Paladin is instead offered fifty thousands of dollars by Russian Prince Radachev (Leonid Kinskey) so he and Paladin can hunt each other. Paladin refuses and Radachev says the woman is part of the game now too; Paladin departs with her. Cavalry troopers disbelieve Paladin and prefer the innocent story of Radachev when he arrives. When Radachev's dog injures the woman Paladin agrees to play the game. Radachev stalks Paladin at night but is shot himself. The next day, an old man begs Paladin for help with his wife who is in labour. This is a ruse, the man has no wife, instead a badly wounded Radachev is in the shed and holds Paladin at gun point until Paladin shoots him dead. The prince's manservant arrives and, learning the prince is dead, gives Paladin an envelope with a letter and a large amount of cash.
177	22	"Dream Girl"	Richard Boone	Lou Shaw & Peggy Shaw	February 10, 1962
Paladin helps Buddy (Hal Needham) transport a large sack of gold dust to Jackson City. Once there Buddy asks Paladin to help him find a woman named Ginger (Peggy Ann Garner) whom Buddy met five years ago just one time on her way to church and who said she'd wait to marry Buddy. The woman doesn't even remember Buddy's name or where they met and is cool towards him until she gets a large engagement ring. That night Paladin rightly deduces Ginger has told Buddy to elope with her. He tells Buddy Ginger wasn't on her way to church but was on her way to work as a "saloon girl" (prostitute) and that Ginger is amoral enough to kill Buddy for his money. She has set up an ambush with two armed men but Paladin stops Buddy and kills the men. Buddy confronts Ginger and buys the saloon so Ginger does not have to go to work but Ginger rejects Buddy and he rampages. Paladin tells Buddy he was in love with a dream, that Ginger hasn't changed and she doesn't deserve to pay for his illusions. Buddy proposes to her, she demurs saying she doesn't have to be married to be an honest woman. Buddy gives her the bar and walks off.
178	23	"One, Two, Three"	William Conrad	Robert E. Thompson	February 17, 1962
Astrologer Samuel Keel believes the stars are bad for him to search personally so he hires Paladin to find Seth Carter in order to win a lottery that will go to the last man alive; Keel bought Carter's stake in the lottery. Paladin finds a former army officer who knew Carter acting as a living corpse in a travelling fair. He tells Paladin he served time following a court martial for a massacre that Carter planned, but could not prove Carter's involvement, and that he saw a man called Welsley recently. This man dies soon after bitten by a snake while in a glass coffin. Former missionary Carl Welsley tells Paladin he knows who Carter is. He says Carter planned the massacre after Welsley told Carter about gold found on Native American land. Carter then used a government agent named Parsons to buy the now uninhabited land for low price. Welsley, wracked by guilt, goes insane and suicides by running in front of a moving cart. Welsley's claims lead Paladin to Catherine Parsons, wife of the agent. She is shot off screen just after Paladin arrives and dies clutching an amulet identical to one Keel was wearing earlier. Paladin deduces correctly that Samuel Keel is in fact Seth Carter. Keel/Carter draws a gun but is shot dead by Paladin. Featuring Jack Elam, Robert F. Simon and Lloyd Corrigan.
179	24	"The Waiting Room"	Dick Moder	Harry Julian Fink	February 24, 1962
Paladin suspects he may have made a mistake when he agreed to take the Wilder brothers (James Griffith) to the gallows. With L.Q. Jones and Harry Dean Stanton.
180	25	"The Trap"	Frank R. Pierson	Archie Lawrence	March 3, 1962
Paladin defends a prisoner (Frank Sutton) against a vengeful marshal (Crahan Denton). Costars Jeanette Nolan.
181	26	"Don't Shoot the Piano Player"	William Conrad	Shimon Wincelberg	March 10, 1962
Paladin helps Emily Eubanks (Fintan Meyler) search the Barbary Coast for her fiancé Albert (James Callahan). To win a $1,000 prize money at the saloon the piano player works at, Paladin wins a fistfight with a local prizefighter. Paladain loans Emily and Albert the money he won; however in a twist ending Albert prefers to abandon Emily so he can gamble in the saloon breaking his engagement; Paladain takes back the money (minus $10.00) from Albert and then escorts a heartbroken but wiser Emily home. Featuring George Kennedy and Virginia Gregg.
182	27	"Alice"	Gene Nelson	Gene Roddenberry	March 17, 1962
Paladin looks for an Eastern schoolgirl's (Jena Engstrom) missing mother (Jeanette Nolan).
183	28	"The Man Who Struck Moonshine"	Andrew V. McLaglen	Barry Trivers	March 24, 1962
Paladin investigates a well filled with whiskey. Featuring William Conrad and Phyllis Avery.
184	29	"Silent Death, Secret Death"	Andrew V. McLaglen	Jack Laird	March 31, 1962
Although Paladin has caught a man, he now has to face a typhoid breakout and incoming Indians. Featuring Robert Emhardt, Michael Pate, John Holland and Shug Fisher.
185	30	"Hobson's Choice"	Andrew V. McLaglen	Robert E. Thompson	April 7, 1962
A hotel manager worries when Alfred Nobel (Milton Selzer) checks in with samples of nitroglycerin.
186	31	"Coming of the Tiger"	Andrew V. McLaglen	Anthony Wilson	April 14, 1962
Paladin attempts to stop Japanese militants from invading the U.S. Featuring Teru Shimada, Marc Marno and James Hong.
187	32	"Darwin's Man"	William Conrad	Archie L. Tegland	April 21, 1962
A rancher (Kent Smith) pits his sons (Richard Rust, Buzz Martin) against one another in a fight to determine which of them will be his heir.
188	33	"Invasion"	Andrew V. McLaglen	Lou Shaw & Peggy Shaw	April 28, 1962
The State Department hires Paladin to stop an Irishman (Robert Gist) from invading Canada.
189	34	"Cream of the Jest"	Richard Donner	Shimon Wincelberg	May 5, 1962
Paladin tries to stay one step ahead of a prankster who may be on the point of playing one prank too many. Featuring Stanley Adams, Catherine McLeod and Naomi Stevens.
190	35	"Bandit"	Richard Boone	Story by : Joanne Court; Teleplay by : Joanne Court & Albert Ruben	May 12, 1962
Paladin tries to bring in a murderous woman bandit Natalie Norwick and stay ahead of the bounty-hunters Charles Couch, Bob Woodward who are also after her.
191	36	"Pandora's Box"	Andrew V. McLaglen	Archie L. Tegland	May 19, 1962
Paladin is hired to find a cabinet official's son wanted for murder. Featuring Martin West and Lorna Thayer.
192	37	"Jonah" "Jonah and the Trout"	Andrew V. McLaglen	Lou Shaw & Peggy Shaw	May 26, 1962
No one is able to retrieve a fortune from the bottom of Crystal Lake. Featuring Harry Carey Jr., Hank Patterson and Bill Mumy.
193	38	"The Knight"	Fred Jackman	John Black	June 2, 1962
A disabled man hires Paladin to find his son wanted for murder. Featuring Jay Novello, Jean Inness and Charles Kuenstle.

=== Season 6 (1962–63) ===
No. overall	No. in season	Title	Directed by	Written by	Original release date
194	1	"Genesis"	William Conrad	Sam Rolfe	September 15, 1962
The story of how Paladin came to be a gunfighter is told. Featuring William Conrad, Parley Baer and Nestor Paiva.
195	2	"Taylor's Woman"	Richard Boone	Gene Roddenberry	September 22, 1962
A rancher (Harry Carey Jr.) hires Paladin to discourage his husband-hunting housekeeper (Kathie Browne) from marrying him.
196	3	"The Fifth Bullet"	Andrew V. McLaglen	Harry Julian Fink	September 29, 1962
Paladin makes good his commitment to an ex-con's wife to bring her husband Ben Johnson safely home.
197	4	"A Place for Abel Hix"	Andrew V. McLaglen	Story by : John Kneubuhl; Teleplay by : Don Ingalls	October 6, 1962
An aging gunfighter whom Paladin was supposed to meet is dead. Featuring Robert Blake.
198	5	"Beau Geste"	Fred Jackman	Harold Jack Bloom	October 13, 1962
A fast-drawing former lawman (Paul Richards needs Paladin's help dealing with vengeful gunmen. Featuring Faith Domergue.
199	6	"The Bird of Time"	Andrew V. McLaglen	Don Ingalls	October 20, 1962
Paladin meets up with a man named Stryker (John Hoyt) who is pursuing an outlaw (George Mathews) whom Stryker intends to kill.
200	7	"Memories of Monica"	Gary Nelson	Don Ingalls	October 27, 1962
A man released from prison (Larry Ward) learns that his girlfriend (Judi Meredith) has married the sheriff (Bing Russell).
201	8	"The Predators"	Andrew V. McLaglen	Harry Julian Fink	November 3, 1962
Paladin must cooperate with a murder suspect (Richard Jaeckel) when they're stranded in the desert.
202	9	"Shootout at Hogtooth"	Andrew V. McLaglen	Herb Meadow	November 10, 1962
The citizens of Hogtooth hire gunmen to clean up their town, then Paladin to take care of the gunmen. Featuring Patrick McVey, Hal Baylor, Les Damon and Doodles Weaver.
203	10	"A Miracle for St. Francis"	William Conrad	Don Ingalls	November 17, 1962
A priest asks Paladin to bring back a stolen statue without any violence. Featuring Rafael Campos, Robert J. Stevenson and Naomi Stevens.
204	11	"The Marshal of Sweetwater"	Jerry Hopper	Gene Roddenberry	November 24, 1962
Paladin has a showdown with an old friend (David White) who has become a dictatorial marshal. Featuring Kathie Browne, Booth Colman and Paul Birch.
205	12	"The Man in the Hourglass"	Jerry Hopper	Story by : Tony Lawrence; Teleplay by : Tony Lawrence & Gustave Field	December 1, 1962
Paladin tries to stop a boy from avenging his father's murder. Featuring Edgar Buchanan, James Stacy and Morgan Woodward.
206	13	"Penelope"	Andrew V. McLaglen	Shimon Wincelberg	December 8, 1962
A servant suspects a colonel's wife (Joanna Barnes) of being unfaithful. Featuring Lawrence Dobkin and Jester Hairston.
207	14	"Trial at Tablerock"	Jerry Hopper	Gene Roddenberry	December 15, 1962
A prosecutor (William Mims) frames a hated gunfighter. Featuring Barry Kelley, Gregg Palmer and Sherwood Price.
208	15	"Be Not Forgetful of Strangers"	Richard Boone	Arthur Sarno	December 22, 1962
A cowboy (Duane Eddy) arrives in town for Christmas with his pregnant wife (Josie Lloyd), but they're unable to find a place to lodge for the holiday. Featuring Roy Barcroft and Robert J. Stevenson.
209	16	"The Treasure"	Andrew V. McLaglen	Story by : Herb Meadow; Teleplay by : Robert E. Thompson	December 29, 1962
A man who has done time for robbery (DeForest Kelley) is confronted by gunmen demanding to know where he hid the loot. Featuring Jeanne Cooper, Jim Davis and Lee Van Cleef.
210	17	"Brotherhood"	Andrew V. McLaglen	Story by : Herb Meadow; Teleplay by : Albert Ruben	January 5, 1963
Two brothers on different sides of the law (Charles Bronson, Michael Keep) each offer rewards for the other's capture. Featuring Myron Healey.
211	18	"Bob Wire"	Jerry Hopper	Bruce Geller	January 12, 1963
Bob Wire (Woodrow Palfrey), a barbed-wire salesman, asks Paladin to protect him from ranchers. Featuring Irish McCalla and James Bell.
212	19	"The Debutante"	Gary Nelson	Gwen Bagni Gielgud	January 19, 1963
Paladin is in for more than one surprise when he looks for a dowager's missing granddaughter. Featuring Wayne Rogers, Gale Garnett, L.Q. Jones and Eleanor Audley.
213	20	"Unforgiving Minute"	Jerry Hopper	S. Bar-David (Note: S. Bar-David is a pseudonym for Shimon Wincelberg.)	January 26, 1963
A woman named Sabina (Patricia Medina) uses Paladin as a way out of her life as a poor potter's wife. Featuring Al Ruscio.
214	21	"American Primitive"	Jerry Hopper	Harry Julian Fink	February 2, 1963
Paladin joins Ernie Backwater (Harry Morgan), an old sheriff friend, in the hunt for a fugitive Robert J. Wilke who killed five men while trying to avenge his son's murder.
215	22	"The Burning Tree"	Andrew V. McLaglen	Bob Duncan & Wanda Duncan	February 9, 1963
Paladin attempts to protect his prisoner from Indians aiming for his scalp. Featuring Elinor Donahue, Paul Fix and Whit Bissell.
216	23	"Cage at McNaab"	Gary Nelson	Gene Roddenberry	February 16, 1963
Paladin gets involved on a wife's (Jacqueline Scott) in a plot to free her condemned husband (Lon Chaney Jr.) Featuring Ford Rainey and Christopher Dark.
217	24	"Caravan"	Andrew V. McLaglen	Jay Simms	February 23, 1963
Paladin is hired to protect a Nepalese princess (Dolores Faith) from assassins. Featuring Míriam Colón.
218	25	"The Walking Years"	Richard Boone	Don Ingalls	March 2, 1963
Paladin must find out why he is imprisoned in a warehouse along with a woman (Elen Willard) and her husband.
219	26	"Sweet Lady of the Moon"	Richard Boone	Harry Julian Fink	March 9, 1963
Paladin is tasked with shielding a homicidal maniac from a victim's relatives. Featuring Crahan Denton, Harry Carey Jr. and Robert J. Stevenson.
220	27	"The Savages"	Gary Nelson	Gene Roddenberry	March 16, 1963
An art collector hires Paladin to find a sculptor who has found solitude in the wild. Featuring Judi Meredith, James Griffith and Patric Knowles.
221	28	"The Eve of St. Elmo"	Andrew V. McLaglen	Jay Simms	March 23, 1963
An Army officer (Warren Stevens) is determined to get revenge on the gunman who paralyzed him. Featuring Brett Somers, Chris Alcaide, Paul L. Smith, and George Kennedy.
222	29	"Lady of the Fifth Moon"	Richard Boone	Don Ingalls	March 30, 1963
Kim Sing (Bethel Leslie) must serve a tong to pay the debts of her deceased father. Featuring William Schallert.
223	30	"Two Plus One"	Gary Nelson	Story by : Fred Freiberger; Teleplay by : Fred Freiberger & William L. Leicester	April 6, 1963
The Indian girl (Susan Silo) Paladin rescued has vowed to never leave him. Featuring Gail Kobe.
224	31	"The Black Bull"	William Conrad	Jay Simms	April 13, 1963
Paladin becomes the opponent in a matador's last fight. Featuring Faith Domergue, Carlos Romero and Nacho Galindo.
225	32	"Face of a Shadow"	Andrew V. McLaglen	Robert C. Dennis	April 20, 1963
Gypsies are suspected of robbing and killing a rancher. Featuring Harry Carey Jr., Lee Van Cleef, Roy Barcroft, Rayford Barnes and Nestor Paiva.
