= The Man Who Wouldn't Talk =

The Man Who Wouldn't Talk may refer to:

== Film ==
- The Man Who Wouldn't Talk (1940 film), a 1940 American film directed by David Burton
- The Man Who Wouldn't Talk (1958 film), a 1958 British film directed by Herbert Wilcox

== Literature ==
- The Man Who Wouldn't Talk, a 1953 book by Quentin Reynolds

== Television ==
- "The Man Who Wouldn't Talk", a 1954 episode of Suspense
- "The Man Who Wouldn't Talk", a 1958 episode of Have Gun – Will Travel
- "The Man Who Wouldn't Talk", a 1960 episode of The Third Man
- "The Man Who Wouldn't Talk", a 1965 episode of Danger Man
