= Anne Neyland =

American actress (1934–2019)

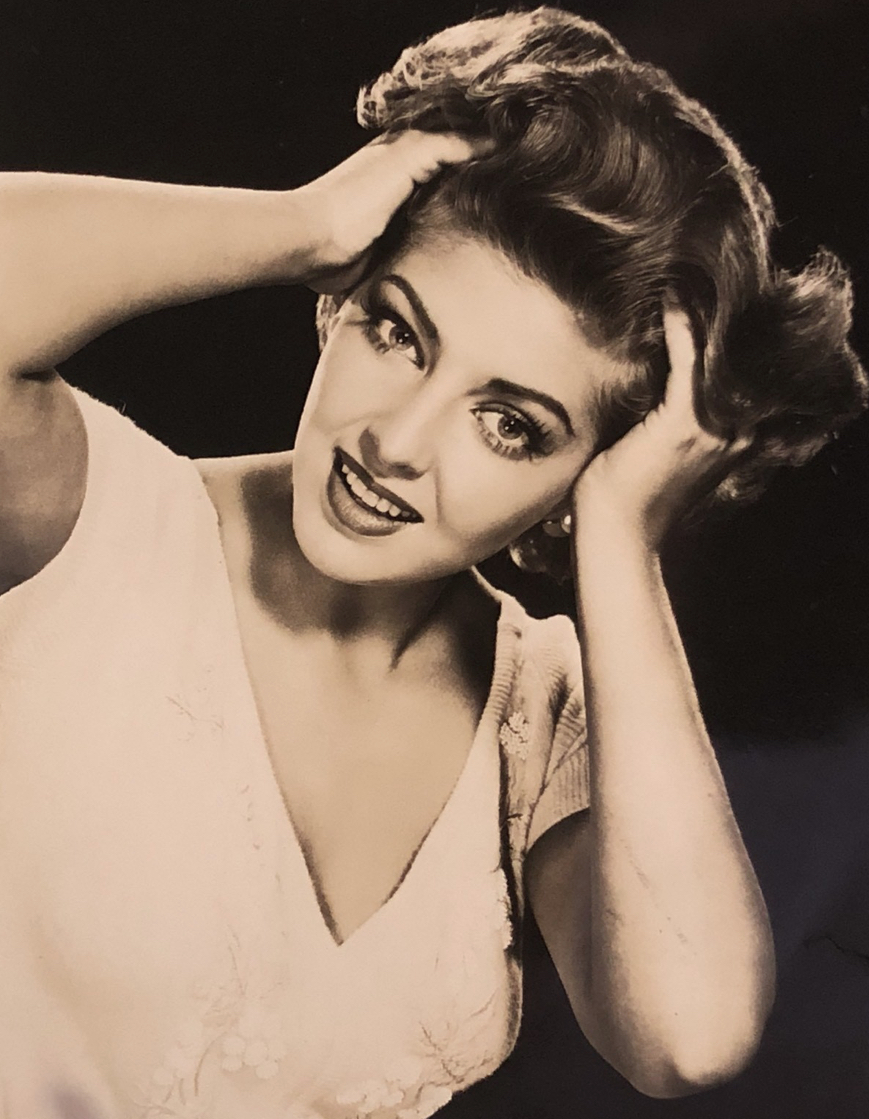
- Neyland in 1957
- Born: August 23, 1934; Gulfport, Mississippi, U.S.
- Died: April 24, 2019 (aged 84); Camarillo, California, U.S.
- Occupation(s): Actress, model
- Years active: 1952–1960
- Spouse(s): John Criswell Eugene Fowler (m. 1962; div. 1964) Charles Rosher Jr. (m. 1965; div. 1970)

Anne Neyland (August 23, 1934 – April 24, 2019) was an American actress who is best known for her role as Laury Jackson in Jailhouse Rock (1957) opposite Elvis Presley. After her film career, she became president of the Hollywood Models League.

== Early life ==
Anne Neyland was born August 23, 1934, in Gulfport, Mississippi, and raised in Dallas, Texas. She attended local schools and began modeling as a teenager, eventually entering and winning a number of Texas beauty contests, including the Miss Texas title. She was the cousin of Robert Neyland, athletic director of the University of Tennessee. At sixteen she began work as a fashion model in Dallas and later in New York City before moving to Hollywood to pursue acting.

== Career ==
Neyland made her film debut in an uncredited role in Singin’ in the Rain (1952). In 1956 Neyland, who was recently crowned Miss Dallas, was cast by director André De Toth after a screen test for his 1957 European-set crime drama film Hidden Fear, filmed in Copenhagen and starring John Payne.

Neyland played Laury Jackson in Jailhouse Rock (1957). A July 1957 Charlotte News interview featured her discussing meeting Elvis Presley and filming the movie, calling him “a nice boy but I feel sorry for him.” She was labeled as her one of MGM’s new “Southern discoveries.”

Neyland starred opposite Steve Terrell in Motorcycle Gang (1957). She continued acting through 1960, appearing uncredited in the film Ocean’s 11.

Her other film credits include small or and television guest roles throughout 1958–1960 on series such as The Bob Cummings Show, Sea Hunt, Peter Gunn, Highway Patrol, Yancy Derringer, The Texan, Lock Up, and Men into Space.

By late 1958 Neyland had shifted her focus to modeling and professional advocacy. She served as president of the Hollywood Models League, an organization promoting ethics and standards in the modeling industry. She stated that the League’s goal was “to keep our standards high and protect our reputation in the public eye.”

== Personal life ==
Neyland had an estranged marriage with salesman John Criswell, who was arrested in 1960 after he allegedly tried to kill her with a knife. She later married Eugene Fowler from 1962 and 1964. Neyland married for a third time to Charles Rosher Jr., son of cinematographer Charles Rosher, from 1965 to 1970. She died in 2019 at the age of 84 in Camarillo, California.

== Filmography ==
=== Film ===
Year	Title	Role	Notes
1952	Singin’ in the Rain	Chorus Girl	Uncredited
1957	Hidden Fear	Virginia Kelly	
1957	Jailhouse Rock	Laury Jackson	
1957	Motorcycle Gang	Theresa “Terry” Lindsay	
1960	Ocean’s 11	Dolores	Uncredited

=== Television ===
Year	Title	Role	Notes
1955	Luke and the Tenderfoot	Blonde Woman	1 episode
1957	The Thin Man	Gerry	1 episode
1958–1959	The Bob Cummings Show	Gwendolyn	2 episodes
1959	Sea Hunt	Kathy Gilliam	1 episode
1959	Man with a Camera	Ellen	1 episode
1959	Lock Up		1 episode
1959	Peter Gunn	Jean Clayton	1 episode
1959	Highway Patrol	Gloria Tulley	1 episode
1959	Yancy Derringer	Wilma	1 episode
1959	The Texan	Ruth Avery	1 episode
1960	Men into Space	Anne Benson	1 episode
