= The Conscience of the King =

- Star Trek: The Original Series episode
- Episode no.: Season 1 Episode 13
- Directed by: Gerd Oswald
- Written by: Barry Trivers
- Cinematography by: Jerry Finnerman
- Production code: 013
- Original air date: December 8, 1966

Guest appearances
- Arnold Moss – Anton Karidian / Kodos; Barbara Anderson – Lenore Karidian; Bruce Hyde – Lt. Kevin Thomas Riley; William Sargent – Dr. Thomas Leighton; Natalie Norwick – Martha Leighton; Karl Bruck – King Duncan; Marc Adams – Hamlet; Eddie Paskey – Lt. Leslie

Episode chronology
← Previous "The Menagerie"	Next → "Balance of Terror"
- Star Trek: The Original Series season 1

"The Conscience of the King" is the 13th episode of the first season of the American science fiction television series Star Trek. Written by Barry Trivers and directed by Gerd Oswald, it first aired on December 8, 1966.

The series follows the space adventures of the starship USS Enterprise (NCC-1701) and its crew led by Captain James T. Kirk (portrayed by William Shatner). The episode is a murder mystery wherein Kirk is alerted that a theater actor (Arnold Moss) might be a mass-murdering former dictator, and he investigates as disturbing events unfold.

The episode takes its title from the concluding lines of Act II of Hamlet: "The play's the thing / Wherein I'll catch the conscience of the king." The play is performed in-universe in the episode.

== Plot ==
The USS Enterprise is called to Planet Q by Dr. Thomas Leighton, a friend of Captain Kirk, ostensibly to investigate a possible new synthetic food source. Leighton's true motivation is to alert Kirk of his suspicion that Anton Karidian, the leader of a Shakespearean acting troupe currently on the planet performing Macbeth, is in fact Kodos the Executioner, former governor of the Earth colony of Tarsus IV. Due to a famine caused by fungal infestation and with no relief coming from off-planet, Kodos invoked martial law and ordered the execution of half the 8,000 colonists, ostensibly to prevent more important citizens from starving to death. Relief came unexpectedly from Starfleet days later, too late to prevent the massacre. Both Leighton and Kirk were eyewitnesses to the events on Tarsus IV. Kirk insists Kodos died during relief operations, but his body was not identified. He reconsiders after researching Karidian's background. Hoping to meet Karidian at a party at Leighton's home, Kirk meets his daughter, Lenore. During a walk outside, the two find Leighton dead.

Kirk arranges for the Enterprise to ferry the acting troupe to its next destination. He transfers Lt. Kevin Riley to Engineering after learning that he, too, was a witness to the Tarsus IV massacre. These actions arouse the curiosity of First Officer Spock, who, after an investigation of his own, learns the history of the massacre, Kirk's and Riley's connection to it, and that seven of the nine eyewitnesses who could identify Kodos have died, in each case when Karidian's troupe was nearby.

Riley is poisoned, and a phaser set on overload is left in Kirk's quarters; Kirk manages to jettison it out into space before it explodes. Kirk confronts Karidian with his suspicions. Karidian does not admit to being Kodos, but argues in defense of Kodos' actions, and when asked to read a transcript of Kodos' execution order, does so with barely a glance at the paper. A computer analysis of his voice results in a near-perfect match with Kodos, but Kirk still hesitates to accuse Karidian.

Riley, recovering in sickbay, overhears Dr. McCoy's log entry and learns that Karidian is suspected of being Kodos. Riley heads for the ship's theater, where the troupe is performing Hamlet, and goes backstage, phaser in hand, to exact revenge for the death of his family. Kirk discovers him before he can act, and persuades him to surrender the weapon. Karidian, overhearing, is disturbed, and Lenore tries to reassure him by revealing that she has been killing the witnesses to his crimes. Kirk, overhearing this conversation, moves to arrest them both. Lenore snatches a phaser from a security guard and aims at Kirk. Karidian jumps into the line of fire, is hit, and dies. Lenore goes insane and begs her father to wake up and continue his performance. Later, on the bridge, McCoy reports on her psychiatric condition; she believes her father is still alive and giving performances to cheering crowds.

== Production ==
The episode featured the final appearance (in production order) of Grace Lee Whitney (Yeoman Janice Rand). Whitney had already been notified that she was fired from the series a week before filming on this episode began. Her brief walk-on scene—in which she gives a dirty look to her rival blonde, Lenore Karidian, arriving on the bridge—was her last scene in Star Trek before her return 13 years later in Star Trek: The Motion Picture.

This episode was the second and final appearance of Lieutenant Kevin Riley, played by Bruce Hyde, who first appeared in "The Naked Time".

All first-season core Star Trek regular background players appear in this episode: Eddie Paskey (Lt. Lesley), Frank da Vinci (Lt. Brent), William Blackburn (Lt. Hadley), Ron Veto (Harrison), and Jeanne Malone (Enterprise yeoman).

The ship's theater is a redress of the engineering set. Set pieces of the ship's gymnasium (first seen in the episode "Charlie X") are hanging on the walls, and the ceiling is visible in some of the shooting angles.

== Reception ==
In 2013, Wired ranked this episode one of the top 10 episodes of the original television series.

Zack Handlen of The A.V. Club gave the episode an A− rating, noting strong performances from the actors including a "great Spock/McCoy dynamic" and "some very credible acting from Shatner." Keith DeCandido, writing for Tor.com, commended the acting of Moss, Shatner, and Anderson, but felt the episode had aged poorly in regard to being able to identify Karidian as Kodos only via an unreliable voice comparison. He gave the episode a rating of 7. Jamahl Epsicokhan of Jammer's Reviews rated the episode 2.5 stars out of 4 and similarly praised the performances of Moss and Anderson, but criticized the ending, calling it "inappropriate".

Michelle Erica Green of Trek Today also praised Moss' and Anderson's performances, but criticized the episode's script. Later Star Trek writer Ronald D. Moore considers the episode "deeply underrated" and one of the series' best.

== In popular culture ==
Kodos the Executioner would be the inspiration behind the name of Kodos the Alien, a recurring character on The Simpsons. This episode is referenced in the HBO Max mini series Station Eleven episode "Rosencrantz and Guildenstern Aren't Dead", where the episode is playing on television.

== See also ==
- 1966 in television
- List of Star Trek: The Original Series episodes
- Shakespeare and Star Trek
- Kang and Kodos
