= Hidden Fear =

1957 film by André de Toth

- Theatrical release poster
- Directed by: Andre de Toth
- Written by: Andre de Toth; John Hawkins
- Produced by: Howard E. Kohn II; Robert St. Aubrey
- Starring: John Payne
- Cinematography: Wilfred M. Cline
- Edited by: David Wages
- Music by: Hans Schreiber
- Production company: St. Aubrey-Kohn
- Distributed by: United Artists
- Release date: July 1957
- Running time: 83 minutes
- Countries: United States; Denmark
- Language: English

Hidden Fear is a 1957 American film noir crime film directed by Andre de Toth, starring John Payne. It was filmed on location in Copenhagen, Denmark.

== Plot ==
Mike Brent is an American police detective. When his sister is arrested on a charge of murder in Denmark, Mike rushes to prove her innocence.

== Cast ==
- John Payne as Mike Brent
- Alexander Knox as Hartman
- Conrad Nagel as Arthur Miller
- Natalie Norwick as Susan Brent
- Anne Neyland as Virginia Kelly
- Kjeld Jacobsen as Lt. Egon Knudsen
- Paul Erling as Gibbs
- Marianne Schleiss as Helga Hartman
- Mogens Brandt as Lund
- Knud Rex as Jacobsen
- Elsie Albiin as Inga
- Buster Larsen as Hans Ericksen
- Preben Mahrt as Danish Detective
- Kjeld Petersen as Jensen

== See also ==
- List of American films of 1957
