= Bruce Hyde (ontologist) =

American actor

R. Bruce Hyde
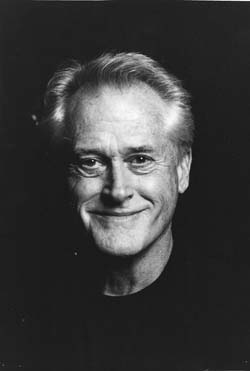
- Born: Richard Bruce Hyde; September 14, 1941; Dallas, Texas, U.S.
- Died: October 13, 2015 (aged 74); St. Augusta, Minnesota, U.S.
- Occupations: Educator; actor; director
- Years active: 1965–2010
- Spouse: Susan M. Saetre (m. July 29, 1995)

Bruce Hyde (September 14, 1941 – October 13, 2015) was an American educator and actor. He was professor of communication studies at St. Cloud State University in Minnesota. His academic work mainly focused on ontology, specifically ontological approach to education, Martin Heidegger's contribution to communication studies, and the study of ontological rhetoric.

During his acting career, Hyde played Lt. Kevin Riley in the original Star Trek series, having appeared in two episodes, "The Naked Time" and "The Conscience of the King".

Hyde was diagnosed with laryngeal cancer in 2010 and successfully fought it off in 2011. However, it recurred in January 2015 and he died on October 13, 2015.

== Early life and education ==
Bruce Hyde was born in Dallas, the son of Rufus Lee Hyde (1907–1990) and Edna Hyatt Hyde (née Andrews, 1908–1996). Hyde attended Robert E. Lee Elementary School in Dallas, Texas. He earned his BA at Northwestern University in 1963, his MS at the University of North Texas in 1984, and his PhD at the University of Southern California in 1990.

== Career ==
After completing his undergraduate degree, Hyde spent several years as a professional actor, including appearances on Broadway and network television. In 1967 and 1968, he appeared in William F. Brown's play The Girl in the Freudian Slip. He was the guest of many Star Trek conventions; in the late 1970s, he was in Denver, Colorado, and Columbus, Ohio. In 1978, he was the Personnel Manager at Teevan Painting Inc., Burlingame, California and directed High School Theater in San Leandro, California. While residing in the bay area he briefly pursued a music career, performing in multiple small venues in San Francisco. In 1980 returned to his hometown of Denton, Texas for a few years. Later in life when he relocated to Minnesota he served as artistic director for Theatre L’Homme Dieu, St. Cloud State's former summer theatre in Alexandria, Minnesota. He was tenured at St. Cloud where he taught until shortly before his death. Hyde was a member of the Actors' Equity Association. After being diagnosed with throat cancer in 2010 and surviving into remission, he retired from acting. Cancer returned and he retired from his position in the Department of Communication Studies at St. Cloud State University.

== Bibliography ==
- Hyde, Bruce and Drew Kopp. 2019. Speaking Being: Werner Erhard, Martin Heidegger, and a New Possibility of Being Human. New Jersey: Wiley and Sons.
- Hyde, R. Bruce and Drew Kopp. 2013. Connecting Philosophy and Communication: A Heideggerian Analysis of the Ontological Rhetoric of Werner Erhard. Submitted to the Philosophy of Communication Division National Communication Association Conference Washington D.C., November 21–24.
- Hyde, R. Bruce. 1995. Hyde, Bruce (February 1995). "An Ontological Approach to Education". ERIC. Institute of Education Sciences.
- Hyde, R. Bruce. 1994. "Listening Authentically: A Heideggerian Perspective on Interpersonal Communication." In Interpretive Approaches to Interpersonal Communication, edited by Kathryn Carter and Mick Presnell. State University of New York Press. ISBN 0-7914-1847-2
- Hyde, R. Bruce. 1991. The Ontological Rhetoric of Werner Erhard. Presentation at the Alta Conference. Alta: Utah.
- Hyde, R. Bruce. 1991. Speaking Being: Ontological Rhetoric as Transformation Technology. Paper presented at the annual conference of the Speech Communication Association, Chicago, and in an earlier version, at the annual meeting of the Association for Integrative Studies, St. Paul, 1991.
- Hyde, R. Bruce. 1991. Saying the Clearing: A Heideggerian Analysis of the Ontological Rhetoric of Werner Erhard. Dissertation presented to the Faculty of the Graduate School University of Southern California. In partial fulfillment of the requirements for the degree Doctor of Philosophy (Communication Arts and Sciences. Los Angeles: University of Southern California.
- Hyde, R. Bruce. 1989. The Transformation Technology of Werner Erhard: A New Language Game for Being. Paper presented at the annual Speech Communication Association conference. San Francisco: Speech Communication Association.

== Filmography ==
- Star Trek the Experience: The Klingon Encounter (1998) (uncredited) ... as himself
- The Beverly Hillbillies
  - episode "The Christmas Present" ... as Floorwalker
- Star Trek: The Original Series
  - S1:E4 "The Naked Time" ... as Lt. Kevin Riley
  - S1:E13, "The Conscience of the King" ... as Lt. Kevin Riley
- Vacation Playhouse
  - episode "Frank Merriwell" ... as Binkie Stubbs
- Dr. Kildare
  - episode "The Taste of Crow" ... as Dr. Jeff Brenner
  - episode "What Happened to All the Sunshine and Roses?" ... as Dr. Jeff Brenner
  - episode "A Patient Lost" ... as Dr. Jeff Brenner
  - episode "The Encroachment" ... as Dr. Jeff Brenner
- The Trials of O'Brien
  - episode "The Trouble with Archie" ... as Malcolm
- That Girl (1966)
  - episode "Beware of Actors Bearing Gifts" as Hobart
