= Lorna Thayer =

American actress (1919–2005)

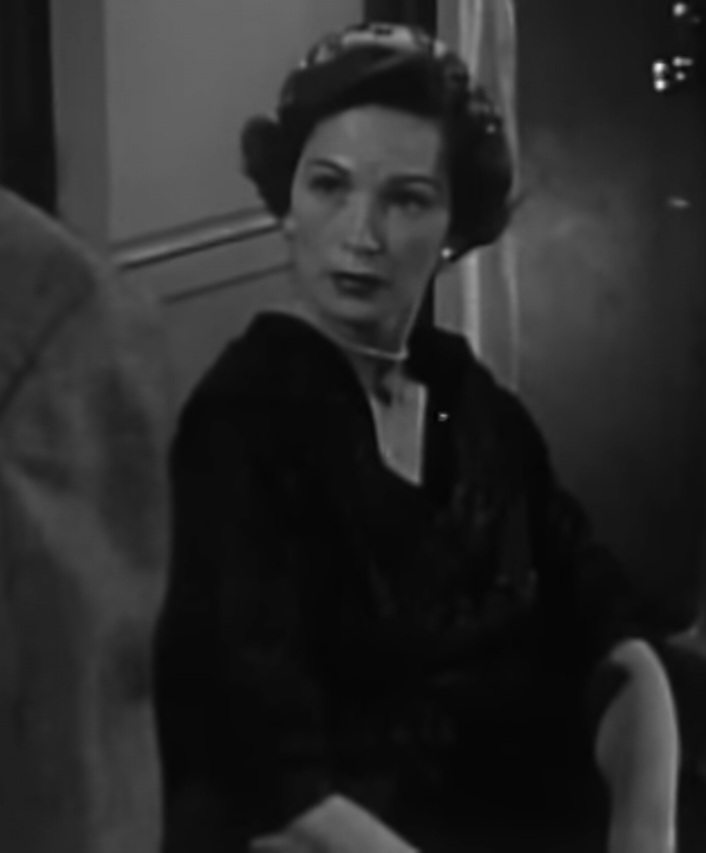
- Thayer in an episode of Medic (1954)
- Born: Lorna Patricia Casey; August 16, 1919; Boston, Massachusetts, U.S.
- Died: June 4, 2005 (aged 85); Woodland Hills, California, U.S.
- Resting place: Valhalla Memorial Park Cemetery
- Occupation: Actress
- Years active: 1952–1991
- Spouses: George N. Neise (divorced); Arthur Dowling (1950–19??; his death)
- Children: 2

Lorna Thayer (born Lorna Patricia Casey; August 16, 1919 – June 4, 2005) was an American character actress, best known as Jack Nicholson's foil in the famous "chicken salad sandwich scene" in Five Easy Pieces.

== Early years ==
Born on August 16, 1919, in Boston, Massachusetts, Thayer was the daughter of silent screen actress Louise Gibney and George Casey. Her father built sets for Universal Studios. She began taking dance classes by age 5, and she attended Immaculate Heart College in Los Angeles.

== Career ==
Thayer's acting career began in 1946 with a production of Street Scene by the Players Ring. (Note: At least two retrospective sources—first, an exceedingly concise 1950 Los Angeles Times piece and a 1966 article from Boston College's Alumni News (regarding Thayer's father, BC alumnus George J. Casey)—both clearly state that long before her serious pursuit of acting in college (and, by extension, her generally acknowledged 1952 screen debut), Thayer had appeared in films as a child. It appears that, at present, any such body of work remains undocumented by existing online and in-print reference sources. In any event, verification of these claims is made difficult by the fact that neither article names any of the films in question, nor states whether any of these appearances were actually credited, nor, if so, under what name.) After that she performed in Berkeley Square at the Geary Theatre in San Francisco.

In 1955, she played in The Beast with a Million Eyes with Paul Birch. She played minor roles in The Lusty Men, Texas City and Frankie and Johnny.

On Broadway, Thayer portrayed Mrs. McCarthy in Comes a Day (1958) and Bel Air Bonnie in Never Live Over a Pretzel Factory (1964).

She is most likely to be remembered for her role in the iconic 1970 film Five Easy Pieces as the waitress who refuses to allow Jack Nicholson's character to order a side of wheat toast. The scene has come to be known as the "chicken salad sandwich scene".

Thayer was cast in a historical role as Jessie Benton Frémont, loyal wife of John C. Frémont (Roy Engel), in the 1960 episode "The Gentle Sword" of the anthology series Death Valley Days. In the story, the Frémonts are in California during the gold rush. The couple becomes involved in a mining claim dispute; Mrs. Frémont stares down organized claim jumpers.

On January 2, 1960, in season 3, episode 16 "The Prophet" of Have Gun - Will Travel, Thayer was cast as Serafina, wife of Colonel Benjamin Nunez (Shepperd Studrick). She also appeared as Doris in the November 21, 1959, episode titled "The Golden Toad", written by Gene Roddenberry. Also, Season 5, Episode 36 "Pandora's Box", as Hanna.

== Personal life ==
Thayer was married to actor George N. Neise, and they had two daughters.

== Death ==
After battling Alzheimer's disease for five years, Thayer died at the Motion Picture and Television Fund Retirement Home in Woodland Hills, California, aged 85.

== Filmography ==
Year	Title	Role	Notes
1952	Texas City	Aunt Harriet Upton	uncredited
1952	Just Across the Street	Girl	uncredited
1952	The Lusty Men	Grace Burgess	
1953	Jennifer	Molly, Grocery Clerk	
1955	Women's Prison	Deputy Sheriff Green	uncredited
1955	The Beast with a Million Eyes	Carol Kelley	
1956	I've Lived Before	Mrs. Fred Bolan	uncredited
1956	The Women of Pitcairn Island	Moa'tua, weeping woman	
1958	I Want to Live!	Corona Guard	uncredited
1960	Freckles	Alice Cooper	
1963	Police Nurse		
1966	Dead Heat on a Merry-Go-Round	Passenger on Mexico Flight	uncredited
1968	The Shakiest Gun in the West	Saloon Girl	uncredited
1970	Five Easy Pieces	Waitress	
1970	The Traveling Executioner	Madam	uncredited
1971	The Andromeda Strain	Woman	uncredited
1972	Glass Houses		
1972	Cisco Pike	Swimming Lady	
1972	Skyjacked	Weber's Mother	
1974	Rhinoceros	Restaurant Owner	
1974	The Gravy Train	TV Interviewer	uncredited
1974	Alice Goodbody	Yvonne	
1975	Smoke in the Wind	Ma Mondier	
1976	Revenge of the Cheerleaders	Lilly Downs	
1981	Buddy Buddy	Lady	
1986	Nothing in Common	Auditioning Grandma	
1991	Frankie and Johnny	Flower Vendor	
