= Natalie Norwick =

American actress (1923–2007)

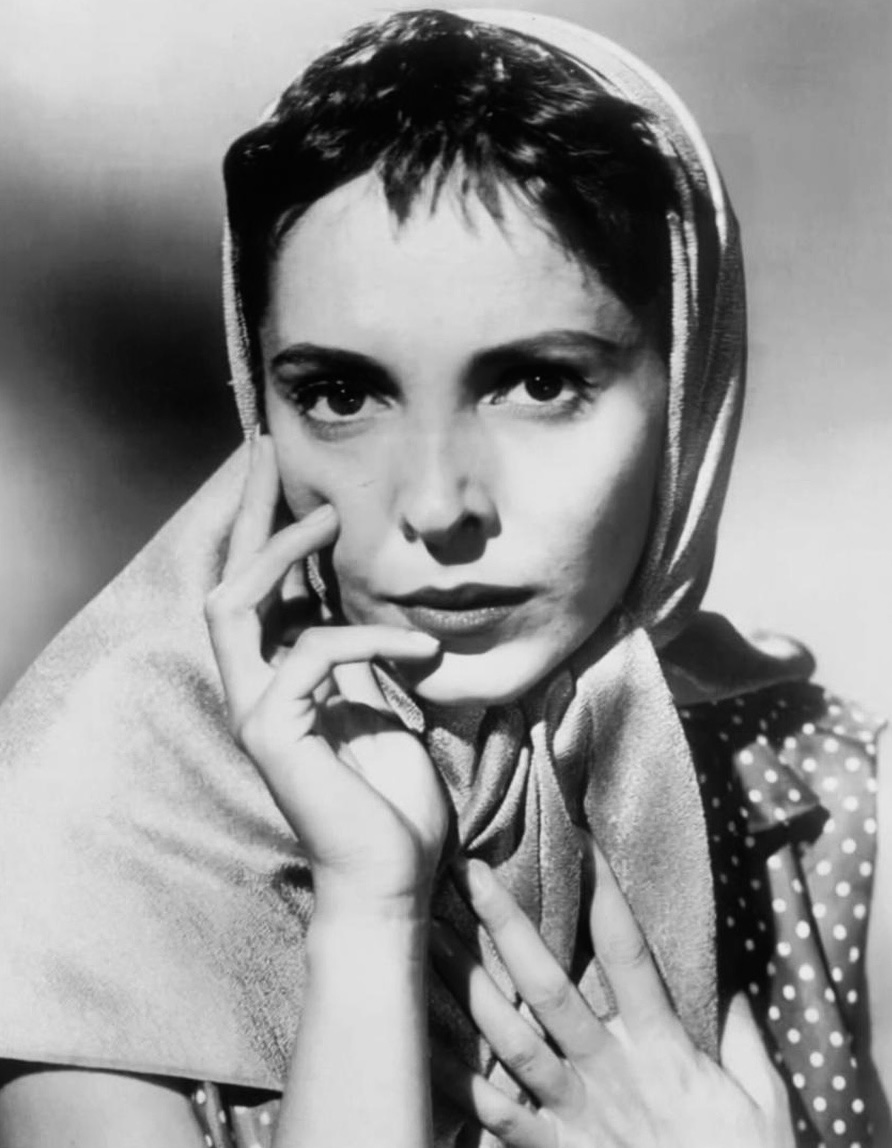
- Norwick in 1959
- Born: Natalie Theodora Katz; May 28, 1923; The Bronx, New York City, US
- Died: December 20, 2007 (aged 84); Coconut Creek, Florida, US
- Occupation: Actor
- Years active: 1945–1999
- Spouse: Bernard Robertson (1949–1955)
- Parent(s): Isidore Katz, Lillian Waxberg

Natalie Norwick (May 28, 1923 – December 20, 2007) was an American actor who performed on stage and in television and films over a span of 54 years.

== Early life ==
She was born Natalie Theodora Katz to Russian immigrants Isidore Katz, a theatre musician, and Lillian Waxberg Katz. Her only sibling was her twin sister Gloria Katz. She grew up in the Bronx, speaking both Russian, her first language, and English. By 1940, she had completed high school, and the following year took out a social security card in her birth name.

== Early stage career ==
During October 1945, Natalie Norwick, now using her stage name, appeared as Eliza in a touring company's musical version of Uncle Tom's Cabin. She next appeared in The Servant of Two Masters, an Equity Library Theatre-sponsored production performed at the Harlem Library auditorium in April 1946. That July she appeared in a summer stock adaptation of Pride and Prejudice, in which she played Jane Bennet.

Following its successful Broadway run in 1946, the national touring company for Lute Song had Natalie cast as the Page while also understudying first Mary Martin and then Dolly Haas, as the female lead. In the latter role, Yul Brynner, the male lead, helped Natalie make the adjustment from character to leading performer, for which she later credited him and her main drama coach Uta Hagen.

Kaufman and Gordon directed and produced a comedy called Town House, for which a traditional two-week tryout in Boston was cast in August 1948. Natalie Norwick won a feature role as Madamoiselle, and performed throughout the tryout, but the part was one of several cut for the Broadway run. It didn't help, as the play lasted only twelve performances at the National Theatre.

The following June 1949, Natalie Norwick did a season of summer stock at the Cobleigh Show Shop in Canton, Connecticut. She had feature roles as "the other woman" in both Made in Heaven and John Loves Mary, ironically just after getting married herself. She then had a five-month run with a revival tour of The Barretts of Wimpole Street through the Mid-Atlantic states, Missouri, and Michigan. Her performance as Cousin Bella was well received by more than one reviewer.

== New York TV ==
Natalie Norwick's first experience in television came in May 1945, when she was one of eight cast members for a special one-time dual radio-TV broadcast of The Town Crier of Chungking. This program was the culmination of an effort by radio station WNEW to experiment with television, using the facilities of DuMont TV Station WABD.

During August and September 1950, Natalie performed in one episode each of two half-hour live anthology series on NBC TV, The Clock and Armstrong Circle Theatre. She followed these with appearances as herself on two television shows hosted by Robert Q. Lewis, The Robert Q. Lewis Show in late 1950 and The Show Goes On in early 1951. That same year, she also took part in her first film, Fourteen Hours, a 20th Century Fox movie shot on location in New York City by director Henry Hathaway. Like many of the bit players hired locally for this production, Natalie was uncredited. The following year, Natalie had two more acting performances on anthology series, Kraft Television Theatre and Studio One.

For the winter of 1952–53, Natalie joined the Bliss Reparatory Company in presenting alternating plays on a tour of the Mid-Atlantic states. She had the female lead in P. G. Wodehouse's 1929 play Candle Light and the feature role of Phebe in Shakespere's As You Like It. After weeks of constant performing in drafty theaters and auditoriums, she suffered a bout of laryngitis. This may have led to her decision to relocate to the West Coast and pursue television and film acting.

== West Coast breakthrough ==
Natalie Norwick had worked on the West Coast once before, for a stage production of Detective Story starring Robert Preston. She relocated there permanently in early 1954, and by May had started work on I Led 3 Lives, the first of four TV series in which she appeared that year. Next was an anthology series, Schlitz Playhouse, followed by the show that really launched her career, Medic. The episode "With This Ring" had her guest star as an unwed mother-to-be, a controversial topic at the time. At 30 years old, when the careers of many other actresses fell off a cliff, Natalie's was given a second life.

Besides the publicity the Medic show afforded her, it also marked the start of a working relationship with the star of the series, Richard Boone. He was her television mentor, and his production company later employed her on seven episodes of his second series, Have Gun - Will Travel. They also worked together on a production of Wuthering Heights, with Natalie playing Isabella to his Heathcliff.

Besides her many television appearances in the mid- and late 1950s, Natalie had small credited parts in two films, 23 Paces to Baker Street (1956) and Hidden Fear (1957), neither of which generated much following. Thereafter, she confined her acting to the small screen, performing in dozens of television shows up to the early 1960s. Though she played a few leading-lady roles, her most extensive use was in character parts, by turns comical, quirky, sly, shrill, or just plain mean as the script demanded.

== Later career ==
Anthology series, which were better suited to those with extensive stage experience, were in decline in the later 1950s. By 1960, broadcast television was dominated by narrative series employing a permanent cast of regulars with a few new guest stars each episode. While she easily found work in the latter type of series, the frantic pace of her television career began to slow down, so that she once again took up the stage after a hiatus of many years. She played the emotionally jarring role of the Samurai's Wife for a stage adaption of Rashomon in a two-month Los Angeles run, followed by a one-time performance as Hippolyta in A Midsummer Night's Dream.

She averaged less than one television role per year from 1963 on, though her 1966 appearance in a minor part of a Star Trek episode, "The Conscience of the King" retains some prominence.

From 1970 on, Natalie Norwick's career was marked by long gaps between performances. She undoubtedly had more stage work than can be documented today, as the slow decline of print media reduced coverage of regional theater. She performed on Broadway during 1979 for the short-lived Break A Leg, playing her own role and understudying the female lead, Julie Harris. Her television work ended in 1982 when she was 59, and thereafter she did only sporadic stage work.

== Final performance ==
Broadway called again in 1997, when Norwick was cast as standby to Julie Harris for a revival of the award-winning The Gin Game. The two-person cast co-starred actor Charles Durning, with Tom Troupe as his standby. The revival ran for 19 previews and 145 performances from April 5 to August 31, 1997, at the Lyceum Theatre. The Broadway company, including Natalie, then did a seven-month tour from October 28, 1998. While playing Stamford, Connecticut, in late February 1999, Julie Harris suffered a fall. By the time the tour reached Ft. Lauderdale, Florida, Julie had to undergo emergency surgery for a fluid build-up from the fall. Natalie Norwick did the remaining shows at the Parker Playhouse in Ft. Lauderdale then the opening performances at the Kennedy Center in Washington, DC the following week. By the time the tour finished in Boston, Julie Harris had rejoined the cast.

Following The Gin Game, Natalie Norwick retired to Coconut Creek, Florida, where she spent the remaining years of her life. She died at age 84 on December 20, 2007.

== Personal life ==
While appearing in summer-stock theatre, Natalie married New York TV director Bernard Robertson in Stamford, Connecticut, on June 4, 1949. She must have already legally assumed her stage name, for "Norwick" was her surname on the official record. She later divorced him in Santa Monica, California, during spring 1955.

Like many actors when between stage or television performances, Natalie Norwick had a part-time job, in her case as a hat-check girl at Lindy's Restaurant in Manhattan. She worked at this anonymous situation until columnist Walter Winchell outed her.

A newspaper ran a publicity portrait photo of Natalie Norwick in August 1959, describing her as "five-foot-two in her stocking feet", brown-eyed, and "plays the piano for fun". It also mentioned she liked to take walks, dance, and play chess.

Columnist Mike Connolly mentioned in February 1960 that Natalie Norwick and her boyfriend, actor Ross Martin, had parted ways due to incompatible work schedules. He was separated from his first wife at the time, and was a series regular on Mr. Lucky, while Natalie was starting rehearsals for a stage adaption of Rashomon.

== Stage performances ==
Listed by year of first performance
Year	Play	Role	Venue	Notes
1945	Uncle Tom's Cabin	Eliza	Murat Theater	The four-day performance at this venue in October was likely part of a longer tour
1946	The Servant of Two Masters		Equity Library Theatre	This English adaptation by Ellen Fenwick was the first performance of Goldoni's play in New York
1946	Pride and Prejudice	Jane Bennet	Gretna Theatre	
1947	Lute Song	Page / Wife (understudy)	National Touring Company	
1948	Berkeley Square		Summer Stock in MA/CT	A summer revival of the 1929 Broadway success with Freddie Bartholomew as the lead
1948	Town House	Mademoiselle	Colonial Theatre	Written by Gertrude Tonkonogy, based on The New Yorker stories by John Cheever
1949	Made in Heaven		Cobleigh Show Shop, Canton, CT	A marital farce written by Hager Wilde, which had 92 performances on Broadway in 1946–47
1949	John Loves Mary	Lily Herbish	Cobleigh Show Shop, Canton, CT	
1949	The Barretts of Wimpole Street	Bella Hedley	Revival Tour	Rudolf Besier's 1930 play had a successful revival tour from October 1949 thru the end of February 1950
1953	Candle Light / As You Like It	Marie / Phebe	Touring Company	The Bliss Rep alternated P. G. Wodehouse and Shakespere during a Winter tour of the Mid-Atlantic states
1960	Rashomon	Samurai's Wife	Bradtree Theater, Hollywood	This was the Tony-nominated adaption by Fay and Michael Kanin that had run for six months on Broadway
1960	A Midsummer Night's Dream	Hippolyta	Avalon Ballroom	An abbreviated adaptation for a single performance at the annual Santa Catalina Festival of Arts
1966	Two for the Seesaw	Gittel Mosca	Community Playhouse, Atlanta	Natalie co-starred with Pernell Roberts in this two character play by William Gibson
1966	After the Fall	Elsie	Actor's Theater, Beverly Hills	The first of a trilogy of Arthur Miller's plays presented by this Rep Company
1968	The Sea Gull	Maid	Inner City Cultural Center, Los Angeles	
1977	Poor Murderer		Coronet Theatre	This was the ANTA West production of the 1976 Broadway version of Pavel Kohout's play
1979	Break A Leg	Actress/Standby: Gertie Kessel	Palace Theatre	Natalie played the role of "Actress" and understudied the female lead, Julie Harris. The show lasted for only 12 previews and one performance.
1997	The Gin Game	Standby/Fonzia Dorsey	Lyceum Theatre	As standby for a two-character play, Natalie had to be physically present in the theater for all 145 performances
1998	The Gin Game	Standby/Fonzia Dorsey	Touring Company	At age 75, Natalie Norwick took over for Julie Harris for two weeks in April 1999

== Filmography ==
Film (by year of first release)
Year	Title	Role	Notes
1951	Fourteen Hours	Uncredited	She was one of some 300 local NYC actors hired by Henry Hathaway to play bit parts and crowd scenes
1956	23 Paces to Baker Street	Janet Murch	Set in London, some reviewers assumed Natalie Norwick's nursemaid was another of the many English character actors in the film
1957	Hidden Fear	Susan Brent	

Television (in original broadcast order)
Year	Series	Episode	Role	Notes
1945	(Special: May 3, 1945)	The Town Crier of Chungking	Chinese Villager	A special dual broadcast on radio and TV by radio station WNEW using DuMont TV Station WABD facilities
1950	The Clock	Rumble in Manhattan		
1950	Armstrong Circle Theatre	The Oldest Song		One of her co-stars in this episode was Ross Martin, who would later play a role in her personal life
1950	The Robert Q. Lewis Show		Herself	That she appeared on the show is known only from a later newspaper article
1951	The Show Goes On		Herself	That she appeared on the show is known only from a later newspaper article
1952	Kraft Television Theatre			That she appeared on the show this year is known only from a 1953 newspaper article
1952	Studio One			That she appeared on the show this year is known only from later newspaper articles
1953	The Goldbergs	Episode of 10/15/53	Wellesley Girl	Walter Winchell saw her on this episode then recognized her as the hat check girl at Lindy's
1954	I Led 3 Lives	Depression	Heather	Broadcast May 22 this was Natalie's first TV work after relocating to the West Coast
1954	Schlitz Playhouse	The Net Draws Tight		
1954	Medic	With This Ring	Unwed Mother-to-be	Her breakthrough role, the spark leading to many more parts in television and film
1954	The Lineup	Dial 116		
1955	Cavalcade of America	That They Might Live		Story of Dr. Abraham Jacobi (Booth Colman), founder of American pediatrics, and his second wife Dr. Mary Putnam (Emien Davis).
1955	The Halls of Ivy	The French Exchange Student		
1955	Big Town	Hurricane		
1955	The Pepsi-Cola Playhouse	The Boy with the Beautiful Mother	Mother	A boy ashamed of his immigrant parents makes up a fantasy mother
1955	Death Valley Days	The Crystal Gazer	Eilley Orrum	
1955	You Are There	The Triumph of Louis Braille		Docudrama series relates Louis Braille (Barry Atwater) and his creation
1955	Fireside Theatre	Nailed Down	Belle	Natalie had the corner on "pregnant woman in a medical crisis" teleplays
1955	Matinee Theater	Wuthering Heights	Isabella Linton	With Natalie's TV mentor Richard Boone as Heathcliff, a rare filmed ahead of time episode for this usually live daily anthology series
1955	Crusader	The Way Out	Magda Varzov	
1956	The Star and the Story	The Difficult Age	Thin Girl	
1956	The Star and the Story	They		
1956	Navy Log	Not A Leg To Stand On	Sally	
1956	The Millionaire	The Story of Sally Delaney	Sally Delaney	
1957	The 20th Century Fox Hour	False Witness	Gloria Vardosch	TV remake of Call Northside 777, with Natalie as the ex-wife of a falsely accused hood
1957	Dr. Hudson's Secret Journal	Love in White Shoes	Nurse Hakopian	Spring fever sets Natalie's character to find a mate in the hospital where she works
1957	The O. Henry Playhouse	The Fool Killer	Elise (Factory Girl)	
1957	The Thin Man	The Dollar Doodle	Marcella Nyle Chapman	Natalie plays the ex-college roommate of Nora Charles, blackmailed into kleptomania
1957	Boots and Saddles	The Obsession	Lucy	
1957	M Squad	The Matinee Trade	Nancy McAdams Wylander	
1958	Perry Mason	The Case of the Daring Decoy	Mavis Jordan	Her quirky character speaks in a deadpan Bronx monotone while convulsing the courtroom with her testimony
1958	Dragnet	The Big Evans		
1958	Have Gun – Will Travel	A Snare For Murder	Amy Martin	
1959	The D.A.'s Man	Sammy's Friend		
1959	Have Gun – Will Travel	The Monster of Moon Ridge	Emily Bella	
1959	Mike Hammer	Coney Island Baby	Rosa	
1960	The Rebel	Angry Town	Mrs. Morton	
1960	Law of the Plainsman	Amnesty	Clara Williams	
1960	Have Gun – Will Travel	Ambush	Sarah	
1960	Have Gun – Will Travel	The Puppeteer	Maryanne Croft	
1961	Zane Grey Theater	Honor Bright	Marie	
1961	Have Gun – Will Travel	Soledad Crossing	Jody Strickland	
1961	87th Precinct	The Floater	Priscilla Ames	
1961	Have Gun – Will Travel	Squatter's Rights	Sarah Clemenceau	
1962	The Detectives	The Con Man	Marie	
1962	Have Gun – Will Travel	Bandit	Sandy	
1962	Ben Casey	The Night That Nothing Happened	Mrs. Tarlow	Once again Natalie's character is an expectant mother in a crisis condition
1963	Gunsmoke	Blind Man's Bluff	Maid	
1964	Perry Mason	The Case of the Drifting Dropout	Miss Standish	
1966	Star Trek	S1:E13, The Conscience of the King	Martha Leighton	A small part on a single episode of a cult classic outweighs the entire rest of her career in modern memory
1968	Dark Shadows	Episode #1.512	Ghost of Ruby Tate	Uncredited, like all of her appearances on this daytime soap opera
1968	Dark Shadows	Episode #1.515	Ghost of Josette duPres	
1969	Dark Shadows	Episode #1.666	Ghost of Josette duPres	
1969	Dark Shadows	Episode #1.708	Edith in the coffin	
1969	Dark Shadows	Episode #1.709	Edith in the coffin	
1969	Dark Shadows	Episode #1.710	Edith in the coffin	
1969	Dark Shadows	Episode #1.860	Cloaked figure at seance	
1976	Ryan's Hope	Episode #1.232	Elizabeth Levitt	
1977	Starsky & Hutch	The Plague (Part 1)	Virginia Donner	
1982	The Edge of Night	Episode #1.6763	Mrs. Jorgenson	
