= Not of This Earth =

Not of This Earth may refer to:

== Movies ==
- Not of This Earth (1957 film), directed by Roger Corman
- Not of This Earth (1988 film), directed by Jim Wynorski
- Not of This Earth (1995 film), directed by Terence H. Winkless

== Albums ==
- Not of This Earth (Joe Satriani album) and its title track, released in 1986
- Not of This Earth (The Damned album), released in 1995

== Songs ==
- "Not of This Earth", a song by Prong from their 1994 album Cleansing
- "Not of This Earth", a song by Robbie Williams from the Bridget Jones's Diary soundtrack
