= Naked Paradise =

1957 film by Roger Corman

- Directed by: Roger Corman
- Written by: Charles B. Griffith; Mark Hanna
- Produced by: Roger Corman
- Starring: Beverly Garland; Richard Denning
- Music by: Ronald Stein
- Production company: Sunset Productions
- Distributed by: American International Pictures
- Release date: January 1957
- Running time: 68 min.
- Country: United States
- Language: English
- Budget: $100,000

Naked Paradise (sometimes credited as Thunder Over Hawaii) is a 1957 drama film directed by Roger Corman. It stars Richard Denning and Beverly Garland.

Corman later asked Charles B. Griffith, who worked on the script, to reuse his screenplay for Atlas (1960), Beast from Haunted Cave (1960), and Creature from the Haunted Sea (1961).

== Plot ==
Duke Bradley's boat is hired to sail a group to the Hawaiian Islands. His passengers include Zac Cotton, alcoholic girlfriend Max McKenzie, and a pair of thugs, Mitch and Stony, who following a lūʻau, without Duke's knowledge, rob a plantation of its payroll.

The gang intends to continue on to another island in the South Pacific, but tempers flare after Max is struck by Zac, which causes Duke to quit, demanding payment. As he is about to set sail, Max asks to go with him, determined to change her life. A hurricane hits, however, forcing Duke to turn back. On arrival, he is beaten unconscious by Mitch and Stony, while the woman is roughed up by Zac.

Zac intends to make off with Duke's schooner and takes a local girl, Lanai, as a hostage, shooting Stony, who objects to this. A fight ensues in which Duke triumphs after Zac is killed by the boat's propeller. Duke and Max sail away.

== Cast ==
- Beverly Garland as Max
- Richard Denning as Duke
- Dick Miller as Mitch
- Jonathan Haze as Stony
- Leslie Bradley as Zac
- Lisa Montell as Lanai

== Production ==
In early July 1956, Beverly Garland was announced as starring in Naked Paradise by R. Wright Campbell and directed by Roger Corman. Garland had made several films for Corman, including Not of This Earth, It Conquered the World, and Gunslinger. A few days later, John Ireland, who had just made Gunslinger for Corman under a two-picture deal, was announced to be Garland's costar. Filming was to begin on September 12.

An August announcement had Lisa Montell, who had been in Shark Reef to be starring. Ireland was still attached at this stage. He was soon replaced by Richard Denning.

Robert Wright Campbell's script was rewritten by Charles B. Griffith.

Filming started 2 September 1956. The film was shot in two weeks on location in Hawaii, back-to-back with She Gods of Shark Reef.

Samuel Arkoff of AIP has a small role in the movie. Arkoff later recalled:

We went over to Hawaii — me, my two kids and my wife, Jim Nicholson with his wife and three kids. Roger told me to come over to where he was shooting, and he gave me this one line to read to Richard Denning: "It's been a good harvest, and the money is in the safe." Now that's a key line (laughs)! That was my first and last role; I've never been asked back into any of 'em since!

The Cocoa Palms Hotel received an on screen credit in exchange for housing the films stars at a reduced rate.

Garland recalled, "We filmed on the island of Kauai, stayed at the Coca Palms Hotel, and had great accommodations. Roger really did this one up the right way. I don't know if it was because we were at this beautiful location and Roger simply felt like spending more, but it was one of the best locations ever, especially for a Roger Corman film." However, it was the last film Garland made for the director.

== Release ==
The film was initially released as a double feature with Flesh and the Spur It was re-released in 1960 under the title Thunder over Hawaii.

== Reception ==
Variety found the film colorful, with interesting action and a well-knit story.

Monthly Film Bulletin found the picture beautifully shot, but average in other facets.

The Los Angeles Times said, "some beautiful Hawaiian scenery, an excellent performance by Richard Denning... and a very believable characterization by Beverly Garland make the picture quite tolerable."
