= Attack of the 50 Foot Woman =

1958 film

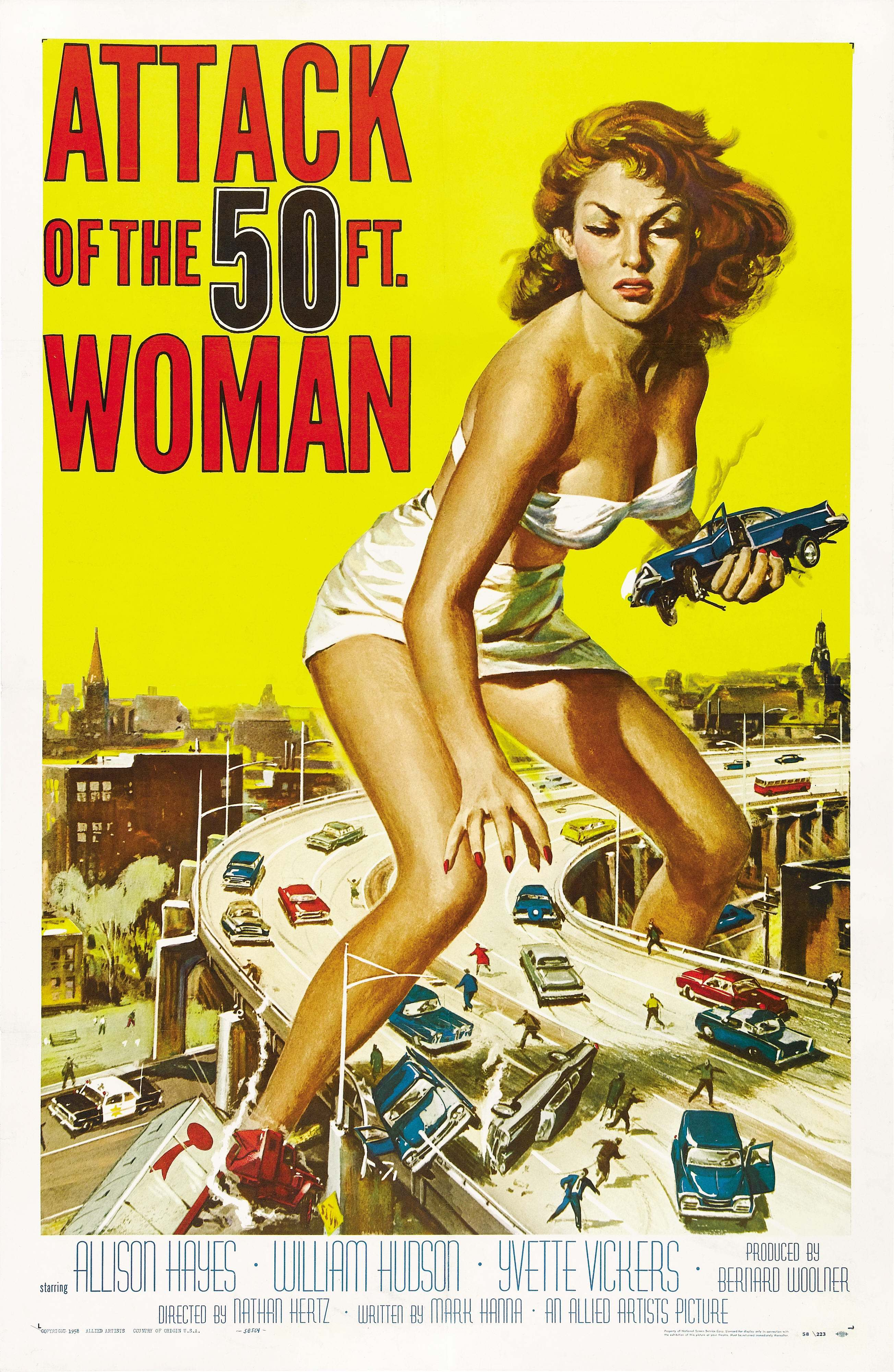
- Theatrical release poster by Reynold Brown
- Directed by: Nathan Hertz
- Written by: Mark Hanna
- Produced by: Bernard Woolner; Jacques Marquette (ex. prod.)
- Starring: Allison Hayes; William Hudson; Yvette Vickers
- Cinematography: Jacques R. Marquette
- Edited by: Edward Mann
- Music by: Ronald Stein
- Production company: Woolner Bros. Pictures
- Distributed by: Allied Artists Pictures Corporation
- Release date: May 18, 1958
- Running time: 66 minutes (theatrical); 75 minutes (TV print)
- Country: United States
- Language: English
- Budget: $65,000–$89,000
- Box office: $480,000 (USA)

Attack of the 50 Foot Woman is a 1958 independently made American science fiction horror film directed by Nathan H. Juran (credited as Nathan Hertz) and starring Allison Hayes, William Hudson and Yvette Vickers. It was produced by Bernard Woolner. The screenplay was written by Mark Hanna, and the original music score was composed by Ronald Stein. The film was distributed in the United States on May 18, 1958 by Allied Artists as a double feature alongside War of the Satellites.

The edited Allied Artists television version runs 75 minutes instead of 66, adding a long printed crawl at the beginning and end, repeated sequences, and hold-frames designed to optically lengthen the film's running time.

The film's storyline concerns the plight of a wealthy heiress whose close encounter with an enormous alien in his round spacecraft causes her to grow into a giantess, complicating her marriage which is already troubled by a philandering husband.

Attack of the 50 Foot Woman is a variation on other 1950s science fiction films that featured size-changing humans: The Amazing Colossal Man (1957), its sequel War of the Colossal Beast (1958), and The Incredible Shrinking Man (1957); in this case, a woman is the protagonist. The film's popularity and cult status has spawned numerous parodies and homages in popular media.

== Plot ==
A television announcer reports sightings of a red fireball around the world. Meanwhile, Nancy Archer, a wealthy but highly troubled woman with a history of emotional instability and immoderate drinking, is driving on a road that night in an American desert. A glowing sphere settles on the deserted highway in front of her, causing her to veer off the road. When she gets out to investigate the object, a huge creature exits and reaches for her.

Nancy escapes and runs back to town, but nobody believes her story due to her known drinking problem and a recent stay in a mental institution. Her philandering husband, Harry Archer, is more interested in his latest girlfriend, town floozy Honey Parker. He pretends to be the good husband in the hope that Nancy will "snap" and return to the "booby hatch", leaving him in control of her US$50 million estate (equivalent to $560 million in 2025).

Nancy bargains with Harry, asking him to search the desert with her for the "flying satellite", agreeing to a voluntary return to the sanatorium if they find nothing. As night falls, they find the spacecraft and the alien creature emerges, revealed as an enormous male human. Harry fires his pistol at the giant, but the gunfire has no effect. Harry flees, leaving Nancy behind.

Nancy is later discovered on the roof of her pool house in a delirious state and must be sedated by her family physician, Dr. Cushing. The doctor comments on scratches he finds on her neck, and theorizes that she was exposed to radiation. Egged on by his mistress Honey, Harry plans to inject Nancy with a lethal dose of her sedative, but when he sneaks up to her room, he discovers that she has grown to giant size. In a scene paralleling Nancy's first alien encounter, only an enormous hand is seen as Harry reacts in horror.

Cushing and Dr. Von Loeb, a specialist brought in by Cushing, are at a loss on how to treat their giant patient, who appears to be 50 feet (15 m) in height. They keep her in a morphine-induced coma and restrain her with chains while waiting for the authorities to arrive. The sheriff and Jess, Nancy's faithful butler, track enormous footprints leading away from the estate to the alien sphere. Inside the sphere, they find Nancy's diamond necklace (containing the largest diamond in the world) and other large diamonds, each in a clear orb. They speculate that the jewels are being used as a power source for the alien ship. The huge human reappears, and the sheriff and Jess flee.

Meanwhile, Nancy awakens and breaks free of her restraints. She tears off her mansion's roof and, clothed in a bikini-like arrangement of bed linens, heads to town to avenge herself on her unfaithful husband. Ripping the roof off the local bar, she spots Honey and drops a ceiling beam on her rival, killing her. Harry panics, grabs Deputy Charlie's pistol, and begins shooting, but she picks up Harry and walks away. The gunshots have no apparent effect on her. The sheriff fires a shotgun at her, which causes a nearby power line transformer to blow up, killing her. The doctors find Harry lying dead in her hand.

== Cast ==
- Allison Hayes as Nancy Fowler Archer
- William Hudson as Harry Archer
- Yvette Vickers as Honey Parker
- Roy Gordon as Dr. Isaac Cushing
- George Douglas as Sheriff Dubbitt
- Ken Terrell as Jess Stout, Nancy's Butler
- Otto Waldis as Dr. Heinrich Von Loeb
- Eileen Stevens as Nurse
- Frank Chase as Deputy Charlie
- Michael Ross as Tony, The Bartender / The Giant Alien

== Production ==
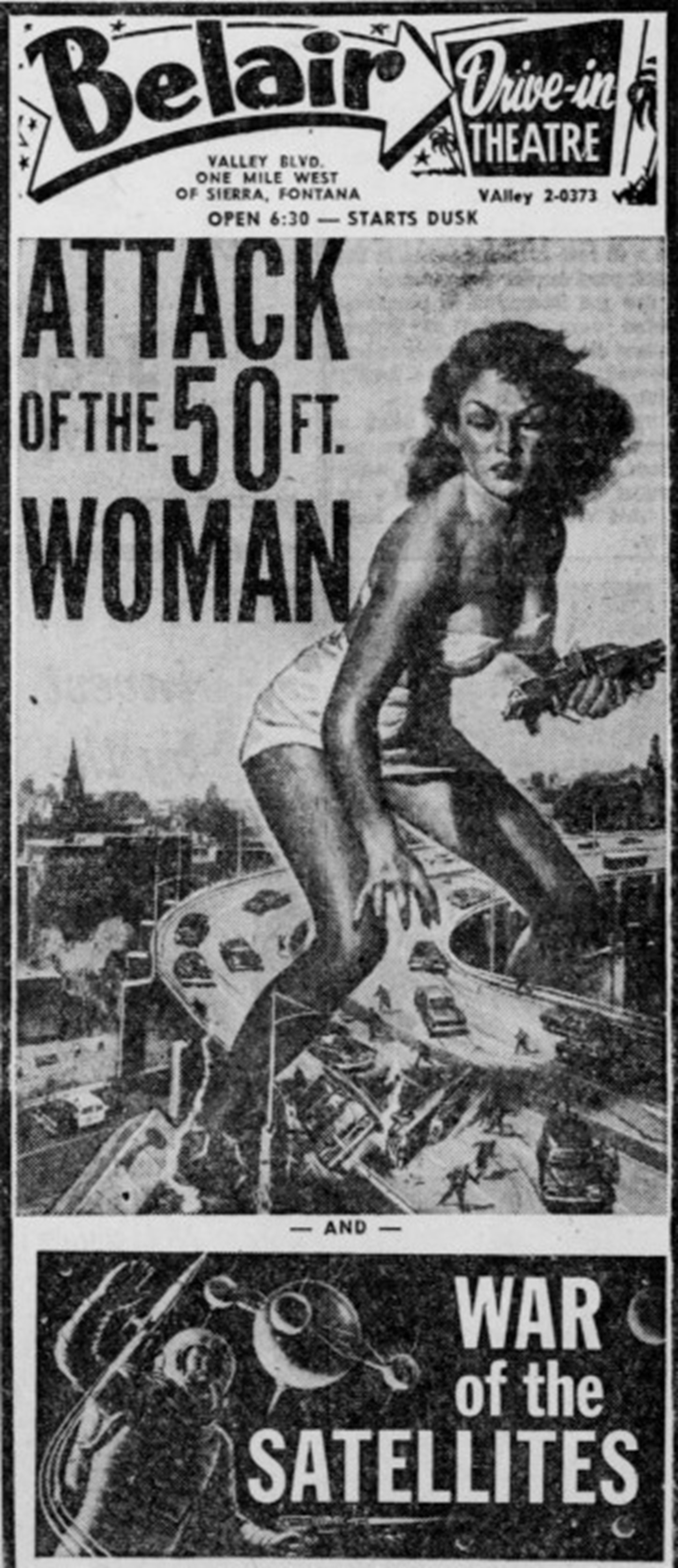
Drive-in advertisement from 1958 for Attack of the 50 Foot Woman and co-feature, War of the Satellites.

Filming started 8 January 1958 under the title The Astounding Giant Woman. The film was also known as The Mammoth Female Monster and The Colossal Female Monster (a title inspired by the success of The Amazing Colossal Man and The Incredible Shrinking Man.

== Critical reception ==
Variety called it "a minor effort".

On review aggregator website Rotten Tomatoes, the film has an approval rating of 71% based on 14 reviews, with an average rating of 6.1/10.

Retrospective reviews and scholarship confirm the status of cult classic of the film.

== Planned sequels and remakes ==
With its low budget of around $88,000, Attack of the 50 Foot Woman made enough money to prompt discussion of a sequel. According to executive producer and cinematographer Jacques Marquette, the sequel was to be produced at a higher budget and in color. A script was written, but the project never advanced beyond the discussion phase.

In early 1979, Dimension Pictures announced that producer Steve Krantz was developing a 5-million-dollar remake with director Paul Morrissey, which never came to fruition. Filmmaker Jim Wynorski considered doing a remake with Sybil Danning as the title role in the mid-1980s. Wynorski made it as far as shooting a photo session with Danning dressed as the 50-foot woman. The project never materialized because Wynorski opted instead to film Not of This Earth (1988), a remake of Roger Corman's 1957 film of the same name.

In 1993, a remake of the film was produced and released by HBO. It was directed by Christopher Guest, with a script by Thirtysomething writer Joseph Dougherty. Daryl Hannah produced the film and starred in the title role.

In early February 2024, Variety reported that Tim Burton and Gone Girl writer Gillian Flynn were developing a remake of Attack of the 50 Foot Woman for Warner Bros. Pictures. Margot Robbie plans to star as the title role for this version.

== In popular culture ==
In 1995, Fred Olen Ray produced a parody entitled Attack of the 60 Foot Centerfold, starring J.J. North and Tammy Parks. Beyond the basic premise, the plot has little in common with the original film, being concerned with the side effects of a beauty-enhancing formula on two ambitious female models. The film was farcical and made on an extremely low budget. The illusion of size difference was achieved using forced perspective with a limited amount of composite imaging.

The 1999 music video for "Miserable" by Lit was inspired in part by "Attack of the 50 Foot Woman". In the video, Pamela Anderson plays a giantess who is listening to the band serenade her while they climb all over her bikini-clad body. The video ends with the giant woman chasing down the male band members and gleefully eating them alive as they beg her for mercy.

The animated film Monsters vs. Aliens (2009) also features a giant woman ("Ginormica"). She is specifically identified as being exactly 49' 11", in a subtly humorous attempt to avoid copyright infringement.

In late 2011, Roger Corman produced a 3D film titled Attack of the 50 Foot Cheerleader, released on August 25, 2012. It was written by Mike MacLean (who also wrote Sharktopus for Corman) and was directed by Kevin O'Neill. The film stars Jena Sims (a former Miss Georgia Teen USA) in the title role as Cassie Stratford and Olivia Alexander, who co-plays Sims's rival, Brittany Andrews.

In 2019, Lana Del Rey released a music video for "Doin' Time", her version of Sublime's cover of "Summertime". In the video, Lana plays the dual role of a giant in a movie and the girl watching it at a drive-in. The girl in the audience discovers her boyfriend cheating on her in a car with another girl. Giant Lana ends up coming out of the screen and attacking the car in which the cheaters are in, while people run in panic. Both Lana characters smile at each other knowingly and the giant walks back into the screen while the one in the audience runs away with the crowd.

In 2025, Beyoncé parodied the movie as an interlude during the Cowboy Carter Tour, called "Attack of the 400 Foot Cowboy", where she traverses different cities, including Washington D.C., New York City, and Las Vegas, where she interacts with a number of landmarks such as lighting a cigarette using the Statue of Liberty, and picking up the Allegiant Stadium, respectively.

In 2026, the show Euphoria parodied the film in the episode "This Little Piggy" in which the character Cassie (played by Sydney Sweeney) grows into a giant.

== Home media ==
Attack of the 50 Foot Woman was released June 26, 2007 by Warner Bros. Home Video on region 1 DVD. It was also available in the Warner Bros. three-disc DVD box set Cult Camp Classics - Vol. 1: Sci-Fi Thrillers, which also includes other two cult classic sci-fi thrillers from Allied Artists Pictures, such as The Giant Behemoth (1959) and Queen of Outer Space (1958). An audio commentary track with co-star Yvette Vickers and Tom Weaver is also included. Although the DVDs are now officially out-of-print, on September 20, 2011, Warner Bros. added the film to its order-on-demand Warner Archive DVD-R collection; the content is the same as on the previous DVD releases. A Blu-ray was released in December 2022 by Warner Archive Collection.

== See also ==
- List of American films of 1958
- The Amazing Colossal Man
- List of cult films
