= Not of This Earth (1995 film) =

- Film poster
- Based on: Not of This Earth by: Mark Hanna; Charles Griffith
- Screenplay by: Charles Philip Moore
- Directed by: Terence H. Winkless
- Starring: Michael York; Parker Stevenson; Richard Belzer; Elizabeth Barondes; Ted Davis; Mason Adams
- Music by: Jeff Winkless
- Country of origin: United States
- Original language: English

Production
- Executive producers: Roger Corman; Lance H. Robbins
- Producer: Mike Elliott
- Cinematography: Philip Holahan
- Editor: James Stellar Jr.
- Running time: 91 minutes
- Production company: New Horizons

Original release
- Network: Showtime
- Release: September 5, 1995

Not of This Earth is a 1995 American science fiction television film directed by Terence H. Winkless and written by Charles Philip Moore. It is part of the Roger Corman Presents series on Showtime. It was a remake of Corman's 1957 film, Not of this Earth.

== Plot ==
An invader from outer space arrives looking to get blood from the human race.

== Cast ==
- Michael York as Paul Johnson
- Parker Stevenson as Jack Sherbourne
- Richard Belzer as Jeremy Pallin
- Elizabeth Barondes as Amanda Sayles
- Ted Davis as Rodman Felder
- Mason Adams as Dr. Rochelle
- Bob McFarland as Detective Mark Willows
- Wendy Buckner as Cheryl
- Joshua D Comen as Danny
- Jennifer Coolidge as Nurse
- Eddie Driscoll as John
- Mary Scheer as Saleswoman
