= Mel Welles =

American actor and director (1924–2005)

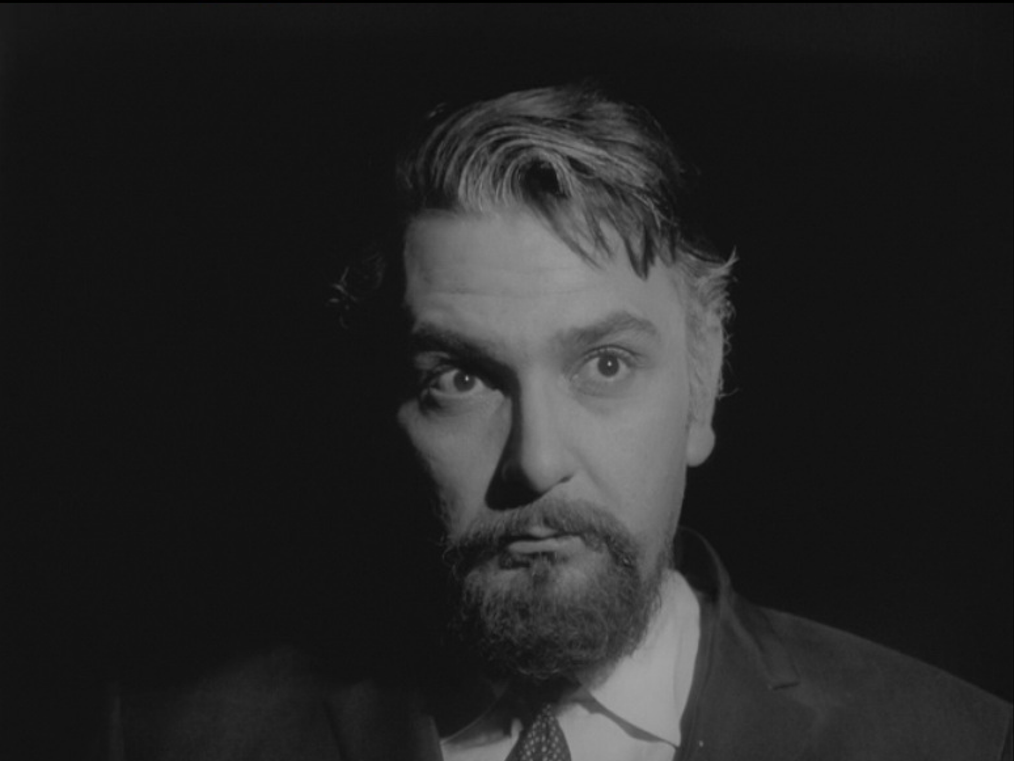
- Welles in The Little Shop of Horrors
- Born: Ira Welles Meltcher; February 17, 1924; New York City, U.S.
- Died: August 19, 2005 (aged 81); Norfolk, Virginia, U.S.
- Education: Penn State University (B.A.); West Virginia University (M.A.); Columbia University (Ph.D.)
- Occupations: Actor; voice artist; film director

Mel Welles (born Ira Welles Meltcher; February 17, 1924 – August 19, 2005) was an American actor, voice artist and film director. He was best known to for his work with filmmaker Roger Corman, most notably as hapless flower shop owner Gravis Mushnick in the original 1960 film version of The Little Shop of Horrors. He also had a prolific career as an English-language dubber, mainly in the Italian film industry.

== Early life ==
Welles was born Ira Welles Meltcher in the Bronx, New York, son of Jewish parents Max and Sally Grichewsky Meltcher. His family had roots in Yiddish theatre. He was raised in Mount Carmel, Pennsylvania and graduated from Mt. Carmel High School, in 1940. He went on to receive a Bachelor of Arts degree from Penn State University, a Master of Arts degree from West Virginia University, and a Ph.D. in psychology from Columbia University.

Prior to his acting career, Welles worked at one time or another as a clinical psychologist and a radio DJ.

== Career ==
Welles did some stage work before traveling to Hollywood, where in 1953 he appeared in his first film, Appointment in Honduras. His favorite role (The Little Shop of Horrors) was also his last in the U.S. for many years.

In the early 1960s, he left the United States initially to make a film in Germany. After the producer was arrested he travelled to Rome to act, produce and direct mostly uncredited primarily in Europe several film productions including the cult horror films Maneater of Hydra (1967) and Lady Frankenstein (1971). His fluency in five languages proved to be most helpful where he started a dubbing company that by his own estimate dubbed over 800 European made films. He also served as a film consultant. Later, he returned to the U.S., appearing in a number of films, doing voice work, and teaching voice acting.

Probably his most widely seen work in the late 1970s was his English adaptation of the Japanese television show, Spectreman which was seen on UHF and cable across the United States. While he shares writing credit with two other people, it's clear that most of the English voice work, and the offbeat humor, is his. Reportedly, Welles also wrote gag material for Lord Buckley at some point in his career.

In 1998, Welles took to the stage in a community theater production of Little Shop of Horrors as Mushnik, the role he created in the original Roger Corman film. Welles had never performed in the musical and was happy to be asked to do the role, which he described as a "mitzvah" for Scotts Valley Performing Arts. Jonathan Haze, who played Seymour in the original film, attended the opening, and Welles also received a visit from Martin P. Robinson, the designer of the Audrey II plant puppets used in the off-Broadway production (Robinson is also famous for his puppetry on Sesame Street).

His best-known work is a beat poem High School Drag, written for the film High School Confidential (1958). The poem was performed in the film by Phillipa Fallon, High School Drag, and has been since noted in discussions of beat literature and mid - century american cinema.

Welles was working on a horror screenplay, tentatively titled House of a Hundred Horrors, at the time of his death.

== Personal life ==
Welles married three times, first to Mary Verduce, then to actress Meri Carsey Welles (who appeared in Little Shop of Horrors), then to script supervisor Annie Welles. He had five children.

=== Death ===
Welles died in Norfolk, Virginia on August 19, 2005, at the age of 81.

== Filmography ==
- The Golden Blade (1953) .... Minor Role (uncredited)
- Gun Fury (1953) .... Pete Barratto (uncredited)
- Appointment in Honduras (1953) .... Hidalgo (uncredited)
- Jesse James vs. the Daltons (1954) .... Lou - Deputy on Train (uncredited)
- Yankee Pasha (1954) .... Servant (uncredited)
- Massacre Canyon (1954) .... Gonzáles
- Pushover (1954) .... Detective (uncredited)
- Bengal Brigade (1954) .... Merchant (uncredited)
- The Silver Chalice (1954) .... Marcos (uncredited)
- The Racers (1955) .... Fiori (uncredited)
- Pirates of Tripoli (1955) .... Gen. Tomedi
- Wyoming Renegades (1955) .... 'Whiskey' Pearson
- Soldier of Fortune (1955) .... Fernand Rocha
- Abbott and Costello Meet the Mummy (1955) .... Iben
- Spy Chasers (1955) .... Nick (uncredited)
- The Big Knife (1955) .... Mustached Party Guest (uncredited)
- Duel on the Mississippi (1955) .... Sheriff
- Hold Back Tomorrow (1955) .... First Guard
- Kismet (1955) .... Beggar (uncredited)
- The Fighting Chance (1955) .... Al Moreno
- Meet Me in Las Vegas (1956) .... Roulette Player (uncredited)
- Outside the Law (1956) .... Milo
- Calling Homicide (1956) .... Valensi (uncredited)
- Flight to Hong Kong (1956) .... Boris
- Attack of the Crab Monsters (1957) .... Jules Deveroux
- Hold That Hypnotist (1957) .... Blackbeard
- The Undead (1957) .... Smolkin, the gravedigger
- The Shadow on the Window (1957) .... Polikoff (uncredited)
- Rock All Night (1957) .... Sir Bop
- Designing Woman (1957) .... Solly Horzmann (uncredited)
- The 27th Day (1957) .... Russian Marshal (uncredited)
- Hell on Devil's Island (1957) .... Felix Molyneaux
- Tip on a Dead Jockey (1957) .... El Fuad (uncredited)
- Alfred Hitchcock Presents (1958) (Season 3 Episode 25: "Flight to the East") .... Police Inspector Kafir
- The Walter Winchell File ("The Bargain", 1958) .... Friend
- The Brothers Karamazov (1958) .... Trifon Borissovitch
- High School Confidential! (1958) .... Charlie O'Flair
- Hakuja den (1958) .... The Wizard (English version, voice)
- Code of Silence (1960) .... Max Frankel
- The Little Shop of Horrors (1960) .... Mushnick
- Hemingway's Adventures of a Young Man (1962) .... Italian Sergeant (uncredited)
- Lo Sceicco Rosso (1962) .... Hassan
- The Reluctant Saint (1962)
- The Keeler Affair (1963) .... Yevgeni Ivanovich
- Un commerce tranquille (1964) .... Antonio
- Panic Button (1964)
- Our Man in Jamaica (1965, director)
- The She Beast (1966) .... Ladislav Groper
- Maneater of Hydra (1967, director)
- The X from Outer Space (1967) .... Berman (English version, voice, uncredited)
- Llaman de Jamaica, Mr. Ward (1968)
- The Great Silence (1968) .... Henry Pollicut (English version, voice, uncredited)
- Die Grosse Treibjagd (1968) .... (uncredited director and cameo)
- Machine Gun McCain (1969) .... Duke Mazzanga (English version, voice, uncredited)
- Count Dracula (1970) (English version, voice, uncredited)
- Lady Frankenstein (1971, director) .... Tom (voice, uncredited)
- Cut-Throats Nine (1972) .... Ray (English version, voice, uncredited)
- Amarcord (1973) .... Temperance / Walla (English version, voice, uncredited)
- Joyride to Nowhere (1977) .... Tank McCall
- Dr. Heckyl and Mr. Hype (1980) .... Dr. Vince Hinkle
- Faeries (1981) .... Trow / Hunter (voice)
- Wolfen (1981) .... ESS Voice (voice)
- Smokey Bites the Dust (1981) .... Abu Habib Bibubu
- Body and Soul (1981) .... Joe Gillardi
- The Last American Virgin (1982) .... Druggist
- Homework (1982) .... Doctor
- Chopping Mall (1986) .... Cook
- Commando Squad (1987) .... Quintano
- Invasion Earth: The Aliens Are Here (1988) .... Mr. Davar
- Rented Lips (1988) .... Milo
- Wizards of the Lost Kingdom II (1989) .... Caedmon
- Raising Dead (2002) .... Police Dispatcher
