= Forbidden Island (film) =

1959 American adventure crime film by Charles B. Griffith

- Directed by: Charles B. Griffith
- Story by: Charles B. Griffith; Jonathan Haze
- Produced by: Charles B. Griffith
- Starring: Jon Hall
- Cinematography: Gilbert Warrenton
- Edited by: Jerome Thoms
- Music by: Alexander Laszlo
- Color process: ColumbiaColor
- Production company: Charles B. Griffith Productions
- Distributed by: Columbia Pictures
- Release date: February 10, 1959
- Running time: 66 minutes
- Country: United States
- Language: English
- Budget: $90,000

Forbidden Island is a 1959 American adventure crime film directed by Charles B. Griffith starring Jon Hall. It was his debut as director, although he had directed second unit on Attack of the Crab Monsters. A young Don Preston from the Mothers of Invention appeared in this film.

== Plot ==
A freelance frogman (Jon Hall) is hired by a psychotic treasure hunter to recover an emerald that went down in a shipwreck.

== Cast ==
- Jon Hall as Dave Courtney
- Nan Adams as Joanne Godfrey
- John Farrow as Edward Stuart Godfrey
- Jonathan Haze as Jack Mautner
- Greigh Phillips as Dean Pike
- Dave "Howdy" Peters as Fermin Fry
- Tookie Evans as Raul Estoril
- Martin Denny as Marty
- Bob La Varre as Cal Priest
- Bill Anderson as Mike
- Abraham Kaluna as Abe

== Production ==
Griffith had signed with Columbia under a five-film writer-producer-director contract; he ended up only making two of them, the other being Ghost of the China Sea, which he did not direct.

"They were really terrible," he recalled later. "It stopped me for twenty years from ever directing again. They were really rank. You see, I got chicken and started to write very safely within a formula to please the major studios, and of course, you can't do that."

The film was shot mostly on location in Hawaii. Filming started November 4, 1957. Photos have been found in the archives of Silver Springs State Park, Florida, indicating that some scenes were filmed there. Rebecca Welles was originally cast in the lead role but had to pull out and was replaced by Nan Adams.

"I had an early chance to direct but was too dumb to know that I had to work with the editor," Griffith said later. "They told me I had an Oscar-winning editor; I told them we needed an Oscar-winning firestarter."

The two films were meant to cost $150,000. Forbidden Island was meant to be filmed in ten days but Griffith went over schedule. According to Variety "Columbia noted that Griffith seemed to be having continuing production difficulties" and sent out one of its contract directors, Fred Sears, to direct the second movie.
