= Attack of the Crab Monsters =

1957 film by Roger Corman

- Theatrical release poster
- Directed by: Roger Corman
- Written by: Charles B. Griffith
- Produced by: Roger Corman
- Starring: Richard Garland; Pamela Duncan; Russell Johnson; Mel Welles; Ed Nelson
- Cinematography: Floyd Crosby
- Edited by: Charles Gross
- Music by: Ronald Stein
- Production company: Los Altos Productions
- Distributed by: Allied Artists
- Release date: February 10, 1957 (U.S.)
- Running time: 62 minutes
- Country: United States
- Language: English
- Budget: $70,000 or $85,000
- Box office: $1 million (est.) or (double bill) $800,000

Attack of the Crab Monsters is a 1957 independently made American black-and-white science fiction-horror film, produced and directed by Roger Corman (via his Los Altos Productions), that stars Richard Garland, Pamela Duncan, and Russell Johnson. The film was distributed by Allied Artists as a double feature showing with Corman's Not of This Earth.

The film concerns a second scientific expedition that is sent to a remote Pacific island to discover what happened to the scientists of the first. Unknown to them when they arrive, the island is inhabited by a pair of radiation-mutated giant crabs that not only consumed the members of the first expedition, but absorbed their minds, and now plan to reproduce their kind in numbers.

== Plot ==
A group of scientists and their support crew of five sailors land on a remote island in the Pacific Ocean. They are searching for a previous expedition that disappeared without a trace, and to continue research on the effects of radiation from the Bikini Atoll nuclear tests on the island's plant and sea life. The scientists, led by Dr. Karl Weigand, include geologist James Carson and biologists Jules Deveroux, Martha Hunter, and Dale Drewer. Their party also includes technician and handyman Hank Chapman.

Soon after their arrival, a sailor, Tate, falls in the water and is killed, his decapitated body floating to the surface. Two sailors are left behind to guard the explorers, while the others, led by Ensign Quinlan, attempt to return to the mainland, but their seaplane inexplicably explodes. The scientists are unable to report what happened due to a storm, so they decide to stay on the island and continue their research. They read journal entries written by the previous scientific team, which mention killer worm creatures. Martha and Dale later go scuba diving. That night, Martha hears "McLane", leader of the previous expedition, calling out to her. Carson descends into a pit that opened up during an inexplicable earthquake and falls, losing his footing.

The current expedition learns to their horror that the earlier group had been killed and eaten by two mutated, intelligent giant crabs, who have absorbed the minds of their victims and can speak telepathically in their voices. Members of the current expedition are being systematically attacked and killed by the monsters, which are now invulnerable to most standard weaponry because of their cell structure mutations.

The remaining scientists finally discover that both giant crabs are the cause of the ongoing earthquakes and landslides on the island; they are slowly destroying the island, reducing its size, by undermining it with tunnels. The scientists turn their attention to a way to stop the mating pair of monsters from reproducing. They are able to kill one of the giant crabs in a cave when their placed explosive detonates, shaking loose an overhead rock that crushes the head of the monster.

As the island continues to fall away into the Pacific, and after barely escaping from their collapsing laboratory building, the surviving trio of Dale, Martha, and Hank finally meet the remaining intelligent giant crab, Hoolar, who speaks to them via telepathy. Hoolar vows to go to the mainland with her fertilized eggs when the island is gone (and the three humans are dead) to feed upon even more people, absorbing those minds in the process. Hank then sacrifices himself by bringing down an electrically-charged broadcast tower directly on top of the giant crab, electrocuting the monster and her unhatched brood. Dale and Martha embrace on the small portion of what remains of the once large island.

== Cast ==
- Richard Garland as Dale Drewer
- Pamela Duncan as Martha Hunter
- Russell Johnson as Hank Chapman
- Leslie Bradley as Dr. Karl Weigand
- Mel Welles as Jules Deveroux
- Ed Nelson as Quinlan
- Richard H. Cutting as Dr. James Carson
- Beach Dickerson as Seaman Ron Fellows
- Tony Miller as Seaman Jack Sommers
- David Arvedon (voice) as Hoolar the Giant Crab
- Charles B. Griffith as Seaman Tate (uncredited)
- Maitland Stuart as Seaman Mac (uncredited)
- Robin Riley (stunt diver)

== Production ==
The script was written by Charles B. Griffith, who had worked with Roger Corman on a number of occasions. Griffith later described the scripting process:

"Roger came to me and said, 'I want to make a picture called Attack of the Giant Crabs and I asked, 'Does it have to be atomic radiation?' He responded, 'Yes.' He said it was an experiment. 'I want suspense or action in every scene. No kind of scene without suspense or action.' His trick was saying it was an experiment, which it wasn't. He just didn't want to bother cutting out the other scenes, which he would do".

The film's budget was $70,000.

This was Duncan's first film for Corman, followed by The Undead a month later.

David Arvedon provided the voice of Hoolar the Giant Crab.

=== Underwater photography ===
Griffith directed some underwater sequences (and also appeared in a small role). Griffith said,

"I had just read The Silent World by Jacques Cousteau and found it to be new and exciting. So when that picture came along, I wrote all the underwater stuff and went to Roger and told him I’d direct all the underwater parts for $100. He said 'okay.' If I had just asked, he would have said 'no.' I had to put it in a way that he would jump at. So I directed all that stuff and it was rather funny. I’d be down at the bottom of the tank at Marineland trying to get actors to do something while (director of photography) Floyd Crosby was hammering at the glass window trying to get them to do something else. (Laughs.) It was all pretty silly".

== Theatrical release ==
The film was distributed as the main feature on a double bill with Corman's Not of This Earth. Earning an estimated $1 million, Attack of the Crab Monsters was Corman's most profitable production up to that time, which he attributed to the "wildness of the title," the construction of the storyline, the structuring of every scene for horror and suspense, and editing for pace. Corman:

This was the most successful of all the early low budget horror movies. I think its success had something to do with the wildness of the title which, even I admit, is pretty off-the-wall. However, I do think a lot of its popularity had to do with the construction of the plotline. I've always believed that, in horror and science fiction films, too much time is usually spent explaining the characters in depth and developing various subplots. Genre audiences really come to these movies for their science fiction elements or their shock value. Of course they want to understand the characters and want to empathize with them all in order to share the emotions present. But they don't wish to do that at the expense of the other aspects of the picture. I talked to Chuck Griffith about this. Chuck and I worked out a general storyline before he went to work on the script. I told him, 'I don't want any scene in this picture that doesn't either end with a shock or the suspicion that a shocking event is about to take place.' And that's how the finished script read. You always had the feeling when watching the movie that something, anything was about to happen. I think this construction, plus the fact that the creature was big and ugly, won audiences.

Corman has stated that the success of the film convinced him that horror and humor was an effective combination.

== Reception ==
According to Tim Dirks, the film was one of a wave of "cheap teen movies" released for the drive-in market. They consisted of "exploitative, cheap fare created especially for them [teens] in a newly-established teen/drive-in genre".

Film reviewer Glenn Erickson, writing retrospectively in DVD Savant, noted that for Corman, Attack of the Crab Monsters was "... (a) more ambitious production, it covers the methodical destruction and inundation of an entire island – all of which occurs off-screen. Charles B. Griffith's screenplay keeps the story hopping for just over an hour but limits the show to a minimum of locations". In his book Horror and Science Fiction Film IV, Donald C. Willis noted that a "spare script gets a lot mileage out of the eerie idea of the disembodied voices" and that "the film "in fact has several interesting ideas, but generally perfunctory action and dialogue, and the monsters are visually unprepossessing".

At the film review aggregator website Rotten Tomatoes, the film holds an approval rating of 67% based on 6 reviews, with a weighted average rating of 6.95/10.

== Proposed remake ==
Jim Wynorski, who remade another Corman/Griffith film, Not of This Earth, for Corman, loved Attack of the Crab Monsters and wanted to remake it. He said a script was written, but "he (Corman) didn't want to do it -- he thinks too much of the original film to do a remake".

== See also ==
- List of American films of 1957
- The Macra Terror – A Doctor Who serial that also features giant crabs
