= William Roerick =

American actor and writer (1912–1995)

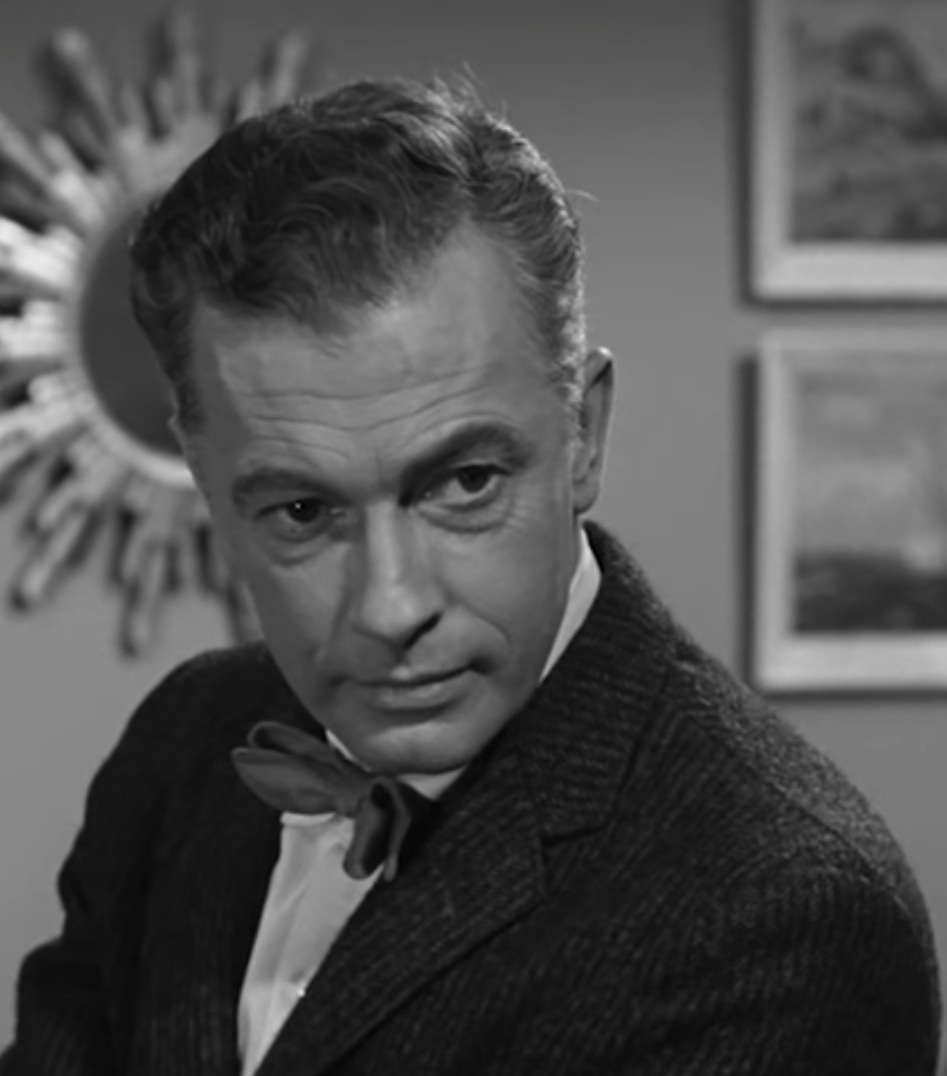
- Roerick in The Wasp Woman (1959)
- Born: William George Roerich; December 17, 1912; Hoboken, New Jersey, U.S.
- Died: November 23, 1995 (aged 82); Monterey, Massachusetts, U.S.
- Other name: William Roehrick
- Education: Hamilton College
- Occupations: Actor, writer
- Years active: 1934–1991
- Partner: Thomas Coley

William George Roerich (December 17, 1912 – November 30, 1995) was an American actor.

He is particularly associated with the stage, but also played in many films and television productions. He was also a stage manager and writer. His name is sometimes given as William Roehrick.

== Early life and education ==
Roerick was born December 17, 1912, in Hoboken, New Jersey, and was a classically trained actor. He graduated from Hamilton College in 1934 and was a student at the Stockbridge Playhouse drama school in 1935.

== Career ==
=== Acting career ===
He made his Broadway debut that same year in Romeo and Juliet. He played on Broadway for forty-five years, his last Broadway role being in Happy New Year in 1980.

Roerick's career was largely in theater, but he did make appearances in several films.

His television roles include the role of Henry Chamberlain in the television soap opera Guiding Light. Roerick played that role from 1980 to 1995 (his death). He was nominated for a Daytime Emmy Award for Outstanding Supporting Actor in a Drama Series for his work in the show, in 1991.

Among his many other television and film roles, two favorites were in Roger Corman's sci-fi thrillers Not of This Earth (1957) and The Wasp Woman (1959).

=== Writing career ===
Roerick wrote the family comedy play The Happiest Years, with Thomas Coley. The play was produced on Broadway at the Lyceum Theatre in 1949, featuring Peggy Wood. The New York Daily News was enthusiastic, as was the Albany Times Union ("Leaves a taste in the mouth like mint leaves. A hit and you can quote us."), but it was not a hit: it ran for eight performances, opening on April 25, 1949, and closing on April 30, but was popular for a while for summer stock and amateur productions.

Roerick summered for many years at his home called The Lost Farm in Tyringham, Massachusetts, an old farmhouse on a ninety-acre plot that he restored from dilapidation, but which remained without electricity or plumbing. He played summer stock at the Stockbridge Playhouse, and was visited by theatre friends – Shirley Booth and Lynn Bari helped rehabilitate The Lost Farm; visitors included Peggy Wood, Mady Christians, Eleanor Steber, and Samuel Barber, and Roerick hosted parties for the Stockbridge Playhouse troupe.

In 1943, Roerick met writer E. M. Forster while touring in Britain with This Is The Army, an Irving Berlin show raising money for emergency relief. The two became friends and Forster stayed with Roerick at The Lost Farm. Forster was quite happy there and dedicated his last book, Two Cheers for Democracy to "William Roerick and 'The Lost Farm' in Tyringham, Massachusetts". Roerick later wrote a memoir essay of this time, Forster in America, and (with Thomas Coley) the play Passage to E. M. Forster, which remains unpublished but has been occasionally presented.

== Personal life ==
Roerick, who was gay, lived both in New York City and at The Lost Farm with his partner and longtime collaborator, fellow actor and writer Thomas Coley. In addition to their two plays, they wrote television scripts together.

== Death ==
Roerick died on November 30, 1995, in an automobile accident, either in Tyringham or the adjacent town of Monterey, Massachusetts.

== Appearances ==
=== Theatre ===
==== Broadway ====
- Romeo and Juliet (1935–1936) with Katharine Cornell
- Saint Joan (1936)
- Hamlet (1936) with John Gielgud, Lillian Gish and Judith Anderson
- Our Town (1938), original production
- The Importance of Being Ernest
- The Land Is Bright (1941–1942)
- Autumn Hill (1942)
- The Flowers of Virtue (1942)
- This Is the Army (1942)
- The Magnificent Yankee (1946)
- The Great Campaign (1947)
- The Heiress (1947–1948)
- Tonight at 8.30 (1948)
- Medea
- Macbeth
- The Burning Glass (1954)
- The Right Honorable Gentleman (1965–1966)
- Marat/Sade (1967)
- The Homecoming (1967)
- We Bombed in New Haven (1968)
- Elizabeth the Queen
- Waltz of the Toreadors (1973)
- The Night of the Iguana (1976–1977)
- The Merchant (1977)
- Happy New Year (1980)

==== Off-Broadway ====
- Madam, Will You Walk? (1953–1954)
- The Cherry Orchard
- Come Slowly Eden
- Passage to E. M. Forster
- Trials of Oz
- Close of Play

==== Touring and out-of-town ====
- Our Town (1939)
- This Is the Army, international touring company (1940s)
- Sabrina Fair (1954)
- Dear Charles, touring company with Tallulah Bankhead (1955)
- Glad Tidings, touring company with Tallulah Bankhead (1960s)
- Medea, touring company (1960s)
- Macbeth, touring company (1960s)
- Marat/Sade, touring company (1960s)
- The Time of the Cuckoo (1966)
- A Cry of Players (1968), Berkshire Theatre Festival
- Janus, opened in Denver, toured; with Myrna Loy (1969)

=== Film ===
- This Is the Army (1943) as Mr. Green (uncredited)
- The Harder They Fall (1956) as Mrs. Harding's Lawyer (uncredited)
- Not of This Earth (1957) as Dr. F.W. Rochelle
- The Wasp Woman (1959) as Arthur Cooper
- A Lovely Way to Die (1968) as Loren Westabrook
- The Sporting Club (1971) as Fortesque
- The Love Machine (1971) as Cliff Dorne
- A Separate Peace (1972) as Mr. Patchwithers, Headmaster
- The Day of the Dolphin (1973) as Dunhill
- 92 in the Shade (1975) as Rudleigh
- The Other Side of the Mountain (1975) as Dr. Pittman
- God Told Me To (1976) as Richards
- The Betsy (1978) as Secretary of Commerce

=== Television ===
- A Time of Innocence (Suspense) (1952)
- The General's Bible (Hallmark Hall of Fame) (1953)
- To My Valentine (Hallmark Hall of Fame) (1953)
- Star Bright (Kraft Theatre) (1953)
- I'll Always Love You, Natalie (Studio 57) (1955)
- Big Town (1956)
- The Louella Parsons Story (Climax!) (1956)
- The Millionaire (1956)
- Strange Disappearance (The Ford Television Theatre) (1957)
- Eloise (Playhouse 90) (1956)
- Paris Calling (Lux Video Theatre) (1957)
- The Man Who Played God (Lux Video Theatre) (1957)
- Perry Mason (1957)
- The Thin Man (1957)
- Topaze (Playhouse 90) (1957)
- The Last Tycoon (Playhouse 90) (1957)
- How to Marry a Millionaire (1958)
- The Violent Heart (Playhouse 90) (1958)
- The Gale Storm Show (1958)
- Mike Hammer (1958)
- Hudson's Bay (1958)
- The Third Man (1959)
- The Man from Blackhawk (1959)
- Five Fingers (1960)
- The Man in the Funny Suit (Westinghouse Desilu Playhouse) (1960)
- Shotgun Slade (1960)
- The Clear Horizon (1959–1962)
- Dr. Kildare (1962)
- Follow the Sun (1962)
- Another World (1974–1975, 1977)
- For the People (1965)
- This Town Will Never Be the Same (television movie, 1969)
- NET Playhouse (1972)
- Particular Men (television movie, 1972)
- Madigan (1973)
- The Adams Chronicles (miniseries, 1976)
- Guiding Light (1974, 1980–1995)
- Freedom to Speak (miniseries, 1983)
- The Thorns (1988)
- Law & Order (1990–1991)

== Works ==
- Roerick, William (1969). "Forster in America". In Stallybrass, Oliver (ed.). Aspects of E.M. Forster. Hodder & Stoughton Educational. pp. 61–72. ISBN 978-0713154351.
- Coley, Thomas; Roerick, William (1949). The Happiest Years. Samuel French. ISBN 9780573609930.
- Coley, Thomas; Roerick, William. Passage to E. M. Forster.
- Roerick, with Thomas Coley, wrote scripts for television shows, including Mama, Crime Photographer, Claudia, The Billy Rose Show and The Kate Smith Show
