= Charles B. Griffith =

American screenwriter (1930–2007)

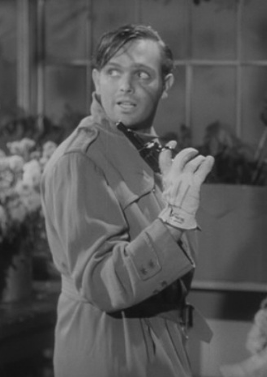
- Griffith in The Little Shop of Horrors (1960)
- Born: Charles Byron Griffith; September 23, 1930; Chicago, Illinois, U.S.
- Died: September 28, 2007 (aged 77); San Diego, California, U.S.
- Occupations: Screenwriter, actor, film director
- Years active: 1955–1989
- Spouse: Marmory James
- Children: 1

Charles Byron Griffith (September 23, 1930 – September 28, 2007) was an American screenwriter, actor, and film director. He was best known for writing Roger Corman productions such as A Bucket of Blood (1959), The Little Shop of Horrors (1960), and Death Race 2000 (1975).

He was credited with 29 movies, but is known to have written many more. He had also directed at least six films, acted in six films, was second unit director in six films, produced three films, and was the production manager of two films.

During the late fifties and early sixties, Griffith created both redneck classics such as Eat My Dust! and black comedies such as A Bucket of Blood and The Little Shop of Horrors. He had a small role in It Conquered the World, which he also wrote, as Dr. Pete Shelton.

Griffith died on September 28, 2007, in San Diego, aged 77, from a heart attack

Quentin Tarantino dedicated his film Death Proof to Griffith, whom he referred to as one of his main influences and called him "the father of redneck cinema".

== Biography ==
=== Early life ===
A native of Chicago, born on September 23, 1930, Griffith grew up surrounded by entertainers; his father worked in vaudeville and his grandfather was a circus tightrope walker. His maternal lineage was similarly theatrical, with his mother Donna Damerel and grandmother Myrtel Vail working as actresses. Vail and Damerel starred together in Myrt and Marge, a prominent 1930s and 40s radio soap opera that ran from 1931 to 1942 and immersed Griffith in dramatic structure and scriptwriting from an early age. following his mother's death during childbirth in 1941, Griffith was raised by his grandmother and subsequently sent to military school.

=== Meeting Roger Corman ===
Griffith began writing film scripts, which an actor friend of his, Jonathan Haze showed to Roger Corman, who hired Griffith as a writer. He wrote two Westerns for Corman: Three Bright Banners, based on the Battle of Brownsville, and Hangtown. Neither was made, but Corman hired Griffith to do an uncredited rewrite on It Conquered the World (Griffith says he asked to take his name off).

He received his debut credit with Gunslinger (1955), a Western about a female sheriff. He wrote the script with a partner, Mark Hanna, with whom he worked for the next few years, although Griffith later claimed that he did most of the writing while Hanna did the selling.

"I got into the habit of writing very quickly without realising it and, because I was raised in a radio family, I didn't know that you were supposed to take a long time to write a film script", said Griffith.

For the next six years Griffith was Corman's most regular screenwriter. He and Hanna wrote a science fiction film, Not of This Earth (1957) which proved popular. For Edward L. Cahn they did a Western, Flesh and the Spur (1957) then went back to Corman for The Undead (1957), based on the Bridey Murphy story.

Griffith receives sole credit for Teenage Doll (1957), directed by Corman, which Griffith says he had to rewrite over night when censors objected. Also for Corman he rewrote Robert Wright Campbell's script for Naked Paradise (1957). Griffith would re-use the structure for this script on several other occasions.

He and Corman had their biggest hit to date with Attack of the Crab Monsters (1957); Griffith was associate producer and had a small role. For Corman he adapted and expanded a TV play for Rock All Night (1957). According to Filmink "watching these early films, it’s clear Corman’s ability as director didn’t match Griffith’s as writer, but the fact is, Corman was the one who found and used Griffith."

=== Columbia Films ===
Following his success with Corman, Columbia Pictures signed Griffith to a contract as producer and director. Jonathan Haze later recalled Griffith had a lawyer friend, Art Sherman, who met Gordon Stolberg, a vice president and Columbia, and " sold Stolberg on the idea that Chuck was the talent behind Roger Corman. At that point, Columbia was making a lot of Sam Katzman movies and Art sold Columbia on the idea that Chuck could do better than Katzman, and cheaper. So, they gave him a two-picture deal. Had he come through and he had really done what he said he was going to do. Chuck would have had it really made." According to Charles Griffith

They told me to make a list of 100 titles to see if I could do it. Once I did that, they picked out two that would send me on a distant location in Hawaii because they knew I couldn't make a picture out of the promised budgets: $85,000/black and white and $90,000/color. I really don't want to get into the Columbia pictures because they thought I was putting them on. Roger thought I told them that I taught him everything he knew, whereas it was actually the other way around.

Griffith wrote and produced two films for Columbia in Hawaii, Ghost of the China Sea (1958) and Forbidden Island (1958). The two films were meant to cost $150,000. Forbidden Island was meant to be filmed in ten days but Griffith went over schedule. According to Variety "Columbia noted that Griffith seemed to be having continuing production difficulties" and sent out one of its contract directors, Fred Sears, to direct the second movie Ghost of the China Seas.

Haze said "both pictures ran over-budget and were not that hot. His casting was bad." Griffith later called the films "really terrible. It stopped me for twenty years from ever directing again. They were really rank. You see, I got chicken and started to write very safely within a formula to please the major studios, and of course, you can't do that."

=== Reuniting with Corman ===
Griffith returned to Corman and wrote two scripts for him made in North Dakota, Beast from Haunted Cave (1958), Ski Troop Attack (1959). He says for Beast from Haunted Cave he reused the structure he developed for Naked Paradise (1957).

==== Little Shop of Horrors ====
After the North Dakota movies he persuaded Corman to make a black comedy and wrote A Bucket of Blood. He later re-used the structure of this for his most famous script, The Little Shop of Horrors (1960). "That's the most precious thing you can find is a new structure", he said later. Griffith was paid just $800 for his work, which included voicing Audrey Jr.

Roger Corman went up to bigger budgeted pictures when he made House of Usher (1960), shot in color and considerably more prestigious than the Corman-Griffith collaborations. Corman chose Richard Matheson to write the scripts rather than Griffith, who said:

He [Corman] said that Matheson had a reputation. They were going to go with color and CinemaScope. It was irritating because I saw that he was making a value judgement based on how much people were making and he was the one making policy. He said that no screenwriter who gets less than fifty thousand a script was any good.

However Corman continued to use Griffith on other projects: a third black comedy, Creature from the Haunted Sea (1961) – which used the Naked Paradise structure – and Atlas (1962), a sword-and-sandal movie shot in Greece.

=== Years overseas ===
In 1960 Griffith produced an Arab-Israeli war film with regular collaborator Mel Welles but they were picketed by unions and had to shut down. Griffith and Melles sued the union and settled out of court. Griffith moved to Israel to finish the movie but was unable to. He wound up living there for two years, writing a couple of films before Corman rehired him to work on the crew of The Young Racers (1963).

Griffith spent the next few years in Europe. He did some second unit work on Corman's The Secret Invasion (1964) and co-wrote The She Beast (1966), the debut feature for director Michael Reeves.

"I was lazy", he admitted later. "Instead of trying to write an A-picture and sell it on the market, I'd just go back and get another assignment from Roger."

=== Return to Hollywood ===
He returned to Los Angeles and wrote The Wild Angels (1966) for Corman, the first "biker" movie (although Peter Bogdanovich claims to have rewritten it). It was enormously successful at the box office. Griffith wrote a follow-up, Devil's Angels (1967), produced by Corman and directed by Daniel Haller.

He did some uncredited rewrites of Barbarella (1968)

His best known credit from this time as Death Race 2000 which Griffith was called in to rewrite for producer Corman and director Paul Bartel. Griffith:

Corman tried to make it serious. He was enraged with me for trying to make it funny, but he took me to see the cars and they were all goofy looking with decal eyes and rubber teeth. I said, 'You can't be serious,' and he tells me, 'Chuck, this is a hard-hitting serious picture!' Obviously, Bartel didn't think so either.

He wrote The Swinging Barmaids (1975), had a small role in Hollywood Boulevard (1976), then wrote and directed the car chase movie, Eat My Dust! (1976), a massive hit for Corman's New World Pictures.

Less successful was Up from the Depths (1979) shot in the Philippines for Corman, which Griffith directed. For the Cannon Group he wrote and directed the comedy, Dr. Heckyl and Mr. Hype (1980) with Oliver Reed. He directed another car chase film for Corman, Smokey Bites the Dust (1981).

=== Later years ===
From the 1980s onwards Griffith concentrated on writing books and traveling as opposed to writing screenplays.

In 1982 a stage adaptation of Little Shop of Horrors premiered and went on to enjoy great success, with many productions all over the world. The producers secured the rights from Roger Corman but Griffith was originally not part of the arrangement. Griffith, sued the makers of the musical, and wound up being granted "one-fourth of one percent" of the takings as a royalty. "It has kept me going since 1983" said Griffith in the late 1990s – although in 1999 he was claiming the deal had lapsed.

His last credit was directing for Corman, Wizards of the Lost Kingdom II (1989).

== Appraisal ==
Jonathan Haze later praised Griffith:

He was very creative. He wrote really funny dialogue, and he was fast—really fast... He would write a screenplay in a couple of weeks. Chuck was very good and very good for that time in film history. He was an innovator. He thought up those really funny, really squirrelly ideas—like the plant that eats people.

Quentin Tarantino was once asked what writers he admired; he listed Robert Towne, Elmore Leonard and Griffith.

"Griffith's scripts were very imaginative and often quirky and kind of subversive, and when you look at any list of Roger Corman's early pictures, those were the ones that put Corman on the map", said Tom Weaver.

Tim Lucas later praised Griffith's writing as:

Irreverent, acerbic, edgy, well-read, flippant, disdainful of the hoi polloi yet also generous, transcendent. Griffith was an unpolished gem of a screenwriter, a beatnik/stoner/outsider who smuggled those crazed and (then) highly individual sensibilities into the mainstream via Corman's commercial cinema. He was the sort of writer who could answer cinema's cry of "Feed me!" by dashing off a non-conformist vampire script like Not of This Earth and make room in it for Dick Miller to shine as a door-to-door vacuum cleaner salesman, or to introduce a character like Jack Nicholson's masochistic dental patient into the midst of the two-day mayhem of The Little Shop of Horrors; who could write a whole movie like Rock All Night that more or less took place in a single room; who had the audacity to write the dialogue for The Undead and Atlas and A Bucket of Blood that ran the gamut from mock-Shakespearean to quasi-Homeric to Beat poetic ... Sometimes his quirky cantos got rewritten, but it was impossible to subvert their essentially subversive character. His zany script for... Creature from the Haunted Sea is the reason why it's the closest thing to a Thomas Pynchon novel ever to appear on the screen.

Roger Corman later praised him as "A good friend and the funniest, fastest and most inventive writer I ever worked with. His offbeat humor was undoubtedly a big part of the reason a few of my early films... acquired "cult classic" status. We had a lot of fun working together to come up with these stories."

== Personal life ==
Griffith died of a heart attack in 2007. He was survived by a wife Marmory James, a daughter, Jessica Griffith, and four grandchildren. His daughter emigrated to Australia and Griffith spent some time there in the late 1990s.

== Filmography ==
- It Conquered the World (1956) – also actor
- Gunslinger (1956) – with Mark Hanna
- Not of This Earth (1956) – with Mark Hanna – also actor
- Flesh and the Spur (1956) – with Mark Hanna
- Teenage Doll (1956)
- Naked Paradise (1957) – with Mark Hanna
- Attack of the Crab Monsters (1957) – also actor, underwater sequences
- Rock All Night (1957)
- The Undead (1957) – with Mark Hanna
- Ghost of the China Sea (1958) – also produced
- Forbidden Island (1959) – also produced, directed
- Beast from Haunted Cave (1958)
- Ski Troop Attack (1959)
- A Bucket of Blood (1959)
- The Little Shop of Horrors (1960) – also actor, 2nd unit
- The Troubled Giants
- Creature from the Haunted Sea (1961)
- Atlas (1962) – also actor, 2nd unit
- The Paratroopers (1962)
- Frontier Ahead (1963)
- The Young Racers (1963) – 2nd unit only
- The Secret Invasion (1964) – 2nd unit only
- The She Beast (1965) – also 2nd unit
- The Wild Angels (1966)
- Devil's Angels (1966)
- Barbarella (1968)
- Death Race 2000 (1975) – also actor, 2nd unit
- The Swinging Barmaids (1975)
- Hollywood Boulevard (1976) – actor only
- Eat My Dust! (1976) – also directed
- Up from the Depths (1979) – also directed
- Dr. Heckyl and Mr. Hype (1980) – also directed
- Smokey Bites the Dust (1981) – also directed, actor
- Eating Raoul (1982) – actor only
- Wizards of the Lost Kingdom II (1989) – also directed

=== Unmade screenplays ===
- Three Bright Banners – a Western about the Confederate incursion into Mexico at Brownsville, written for Roger Corman – Griffith's first screenplay
- Hang Town – a Western written for Roger Corman – Griffith's second screenplay
- Devil on Horseback (1955) – a Western written for Roger Corman about bandit Juan Cortina – meant to star Montgomery Clift and Pedro Armendáriz
- The Nth Man (1957) – adaptation of a novel about a giant man; Griffith wrote the first draft then left the project which was written by Mark Hanna and Bert I. Gordon as The Amazing Colossal Man (1957)
- Flash, Son of Hitler
- Mind Out of Time
- Part Time Mother – script for Roger Corman's Filmgroup, based on a story by Mitchell Healy, about a working widowed mother
- The Gold Bug (1964) – from the novel by Edgar Allan Poe, written for Roger Corman to star Vincent Price, Basil Rathbone and Peter Lorre
- The Trip (1966) – the first two drafts of the script not used in the final film
- Hit the High Road (1970) – a comedy drama to be produced by Tamara Assayev and directed by Jimmy Murakami, about two teenage girls
- The Mouldering Mistress of Wier
- Who Stole Irving? – based on a play by Menahem Golan and meant to star Groucho Marx
- Roger the Rager – comedy about road rage
- Two on the Isle – a comedy
- Out of this World – described by Griffith as "a very large scale science fiction film"
- The Real McCoy
- Oy Vey, My Son Is Gay – described by Griffith as "the Jewish La Cage aux Folles, written for Cannon.

== Interviews ==
- Scary Monsters Magazine, April 2008, no. 66 "Charles Griffith's Last Interview" Part 1. by Lawrence Fultz Jr.
- Scary Monsters Magazine, June 2008, no. 67 "Charles Griffith's Last Interview" Part 2. by Lawrence Fultz Jr.
- Video Watchdog Magazine, July 2008, no. 141, "Here Lies a Man Who Was Not of This Earth: A Eulogy for Charles B. Griffith" by Justin Humphreys
