= Maneater of Hydra =

1967 West German–Spanish film by Mel Welles

- Spanish film poster
- Directed by: Mel Welles
- Written by: Ira Meltcher; Ernst von Theumer
- Produced by: George Ferrer; Ernst von Theumer
- Starring: Cameron Mitchell; Kai Fischer; Elisa Montés; George Martin
- Cinematography: Cecilio Paniagua; Juan Mariné
- Edited by: Siegfried Krämer (German version); Antonio Cánovas (Spanish version)
- Music by: José Munoz Molleda; Antón García Abril
- Production companies: Tefi-Film; Orbita-Films
- Release date: 1967
- Running time: 88 minutes
- Countries: West Germany; Spain
- Language: English

Maneater of Hydra (German: Das Geheimnis der Todesinsel, lit. 'The Secret of Death Island'; Spanish: La isla de la muerte, lit. 'The Island of Death') is a West German–Spanish co-production released in 1967 directed by American expatriate Mel Welles. The alternate titles include Island of the Doomed and The Blood Suckers (U.K. title). The horror film is set on a remote island off the shore of an unidentified European country, in which the central character is a mad scientist (Cameron Mitchell) who creates hybrid trees that feed on human blood.

== Plot ==
A group of tourists travel to an island to see its exotic botanicals. There they meet Baron von Weser, a reclusive scientist studying esoteric horticulture and experimenting with crossbreeding dangerous varieties of plants. One of the Baron’s creations is draining the blood of human beings (through a small hole in their cheek) and the tourists are dying one by one."

== Cast ==
- Cameron Mitchell as Baron von Weser
- Elisa Montés as Beth Christiansen
- George Martin as David Moss
- Kai Fischer as Cora Robinson
- Hermann Nehlsen as Professor Julius Demerist
- Rolf von Nauckhoff as James Robinson
- Matilde Muñoz Sampedro as Myrtle Callahan
- Ricardo Valle as Alfredo
- Mike Brendel as Baldi / Baldi's brother

== Critical reception ==
According to one reviewer, "This Spanish/German co-production...is pretty bloody for its time (especially the finale) but, unfortunately, the print used for the DVD from Shout! Factory (as part of their "Elvira Movie Macabre" series) is a terribly soft fullframe speckled mess that's full of drop-outs, emulsion scratches and jitter. It's also obvious that it's a TV print (although it appears to be uncut), as every ten minutes the film fades to black. If you've never seen this film before, it's a pretty decent mystery/horror film with some fluid camerawork, atmosphere and a few good scares."

DVD Verdict reported Maneater of Hydra is "...a badly acted and dubbed Eurohorror that gives us carnivorous trees feasting on unsuspecting tourists. Unfortunately, these tourists are so whiny and clueless that they come off as idiots, so you end up rooting for the trees."
