= Ghost of the China Sea =

1958 film by Fred F. Sears

- Directed by: Fred F. Sears
- Written by: Charles B. Griffith; David Brian
- Produced by: Charles B. Griffith
- Starring: David Brian; Lynette Bernay; Norman Wright
- Cinematography: Gilbert Warrenton
- Edited by: Charles Nelson
- Music by: Alexander Laszlo
- Production companies: Charles B. Griffith Productions; Columbia; Polynesian Film Productions
- Distributed by: Columbia Pictures
- Release date: September 1958
- Running time: 73 minutes
- Country: United States
- Language: English
- Budget: $80,000

Ghost of the China Sea is a 1958 American war film released by Columbia Pictures co-written by Charles B. Griffith set during World War II. It was the last movie directed by Fred F. Sears.

== Plot ==
During World War II, Japanese troops over-run a sugar cane plantation in the Philippines. Some survivors take over a small boat called the USS Frankenstein and attempt to sail to safety.

== Cast ==
- David Brian as Martin French
- Lynn Bernay as Justine Woolf
- Jonathan Haze as Larry Peters
- Norman Wright as Darby Edwards
- Harry Chang as Hito Matsumo
- Gene Bergman as Sabatio Trinidad
- Kam Fong Chun as Pvt. Hakashima
- Mel Prestidge as Gaetano Gato
- Jamie Del Rosario
- Dan Taba as Capt. Zaikaku
- Bud Pente as Col. McCutcheon

== Production ==
Following his success with Corman, Columbia Pictures signed Griffith to a contract as producer and director. The film was the first of what was meant to be five movies made by Griffith for Columbia Pictures, but he ended up only making two - this and Forbidden Island. Both were shot on location in Hawaii. Jonathan Haze later recalled:

Chuck had a friend who was a lawyer, Art Sherman, who had met Gordon Stolberg, then vice-president of Columbia Pictures. Art sold Stolberg on the idea that Chuck was the talent behind Roger Corman. At that point, Columbia was making a lot of Sam Katzman movies and Art sold Columbia on the idea that Chuck could do better than Katzman, and cheaper. So, they gave him a two-picture deal.Had he come through and he had really done what he said he was going to do. Chuck would have had it really made. Both pictures ran over-budget and were not that hot. His casting was bad.

According to Charles Griffith, "They told me to make a list of 100 titles to see if I could do it. Once I did that, they picked out two that would send me on a distant location in Hawaii because they knew I couldn't make a picture out of the promised budgets: $85,000/black and white and $90,000/color."

The two films were meant to cost $150,000. Forbidden Island was meant to be filmed in ten days, starting 4 November 1957, but Griffith went over schedule. According to Variety "Columbia noted that Griffith seemed to be having continuing production difficulties" and sent out one of its contract directors, Fred Sears, to direct the second movie, Ghost of the China Sea.
