= The Little Shop of Horrors =

1960 film by Roger Corman

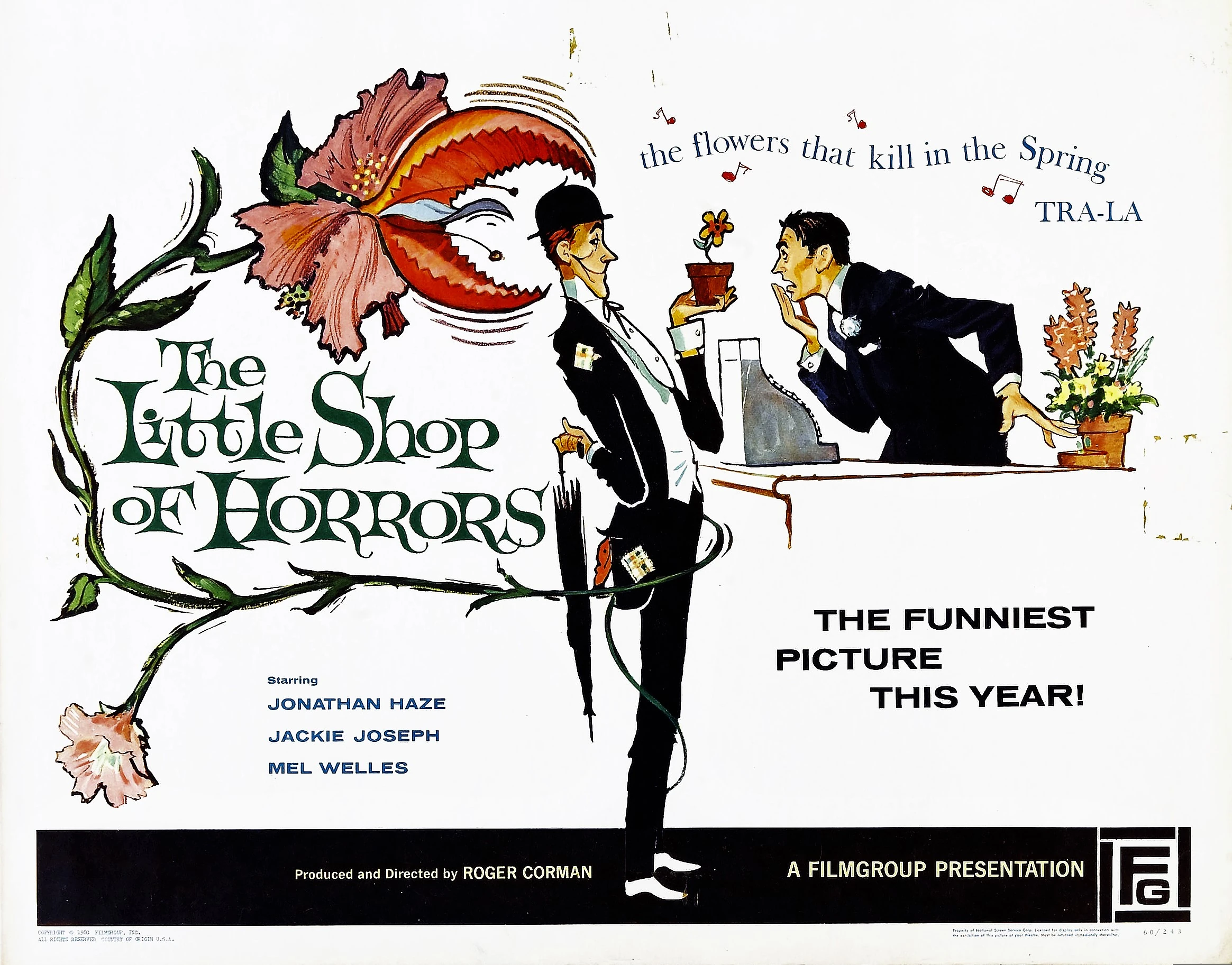
- Half-sheet poster
- Directed by: Roger Corman
- Screenplay by: Charles B. Griffith
- Produced by: Roger Corman
- Starring: Jonathan Haze; Jackie Joseph; Mel Welles
- Cinematography: Archie Dalzell
- Edited by: Marshall Neilan Jr.
- Music by: Fred Katz; Uncredited: Ronald Stein
- Production companies: The Filmgroup; Santa Clara Productions
- Distributed by: The Filmgroup; American International Pictures
- Release date: September 14, 1960
- Running time: 72 minutes
- Country: United States
- Language: English
- Budget: $28,000–34,000
- Box office: 25,066 admissions (France)

The Little Shop of Horrors is a 1960 American comedy horror film directed and produced by Roger Corman, from a screenplay by Charles B. Griffith. The film is a farce about a florist's assistant who cultivates a plant that feeds on human blood. It stars Jonathan Haze, Jackie Joseph, Mel Welles, and Dick Miller, who had all worked for Corman on previous films. Produced under the title The Passionate People Eater, the film employs an original style of humor, combining dark comedy with farce and incorporating Jewish humor and elements of spoof. The Little Shop of Horrors was shot on a budget of $28,000 (equivalent to $305,000 in 2025). Interiors were shot in two days, by utilizing sets that had been left standing from A Bucket of Blood.

The film was released in October 1960 by Filmgroup as a double feature with Filmgroup's Last Woman on Earth (1960). The film slowly gained a cult following through word of mouth when it was later distributed as the B movie in a double feature with Mario Bava's Black Sunday (1960).

The film's popularity increased with local television broadcasts, and the presence of a young Jack Nicholson, whose small role in the film has been prominently promoted on its home video releases. The film was the basis for an Off-Broadway musical, Little Shop of Horrors, which in turn was adapted into a 1986 feature film. The musical enjoyed a 2003 Broadway debut and a 2019 off-Broadway revival, among other productions.

== Plot ==
The full film

Florist shop owner Gravis Mushnick has two employees, Audrey Fulquard and Seymour Krelborn. Located on skid row, Mushnick's rundown shop gets little business. When Seymour fouls up a floral arrangement for dentist Dr. Farb, Mushnick fires him. Hoping to change his mind, Seymour talks about a plant he has grown from seeds he got from a "Japanese gardener over on Central Avenue". Seymour names the plant "Audrey Jr.", which delights Audrey.

When finally shown the plant, Mushnick is unimpressed. One of the shop's customers, Burson Fouch, suggests that Audrey Jr.'s uniqueness might attract people to see it, and Mushnick gives Seymour one week to revive the plant. The usual plant food does not nourish it, but when Seymour accidentally pricks his finger, he discovers that the plant craves blood. Fed on Seymour's blood, Audrey Jr. begins to grow. The shop's revenues increase when customers are lured in to see the plant. Mushnick gives Seymour a raise and tells him to refer to him as "Dad".

The plant develops the ability to speak and demands that Seymour feed it. Now anemic, Seymour walks along a railroad track. Throwing a rock to vent his frustration, he inadvertently knocks out a tramp who falls on the track and is run over by a train. He tries to dispose of the body by burying it in a yard but is nearly caught each time. Guilt-ridden, Seymour returns to the shop with the mutilated body parts and reluctantly feeds them to Audrey Jr. Meanwhile, Mushnick returns to the shop to get cash and secretly observes Seymour feeding the plant. Mushnick considers telling the police but hesitates after seeing the line of customers at his shop the next day.

Seymour eventually arrives too, suffering from a toothache. Mushnick confronts him about Audrey Jr.'s eating habits without explicitly revealing what he knows about the plant. Seymour grows increasingly distressed as he realizes that Mushnick knows the truth. After finishing his rant, Mushnick sends Seymour to Farb, who wants to pull several of his teeth in retaliation for his ruined flowers. Defending himself with a drill, Seymour kills Farb. Although horrified, Seymour feeds Farb's body to Audrey Jr. The disappearances of the two men attract the attention of Sergeant Joe Fink and his assistant Officer Frank Stoolie.

Audrey Jr. grows several feet tall and is budding. A representative of the Society of Silent Flower Observers of Southern California announces that Seymour will receive a trophy and that she will return to the shop when the plant's buds open. While Seymour and Audrey go on a date, Mushnick stays at the shop to prevent Audrey Jr. from harming more people.

While alone in his shop, Mushnick is accosted by Kloy Haddock, a robber who pretended to be a customer earlier that day. Haddock believes that the huge crowds he observed at the shop indicate the presence of a lot of money. After Mushnick tricks Haddock into thinking that the money is inside Audrey Jr., the plant eats Haddock.

When forced to jeopardize his relationship with Audrey to keep her from discovering Audrey Jr.'s nature, Seymour confronts the plant, planning to no longer do its bidding. The plant then hypnotizes Seymour and commands him to bring it more food. He wanders the night streets and knocks out a prostitute, whom he takes to Audrey Jr.

Lacking clues about the disappearances, Fink and Stoolie attend a sunset celebration at the shop during which Seymour is to be presented with the trophy and Audrey Jr.'s buds are expected to bloom. As the attendees watch, four buds open; inside each flower is the face of one of Audrey Jr.'s victims. Fink and Stoolie realize that Seymour is the murderer.

Seymour flees from the shop with the officers in pursuit. He loses them and makes his way back to the now-empty shop, where he blames the hungry Audrey Jr. for ruining his life. Seymour grabs a kitchen knife and climbs into Audrey Jr.'s maw with the intention of killing it.

Later that evening, Audrey Jr. begins to die. To everyone's surprise, the final bloom opens to reveal Seymour's face who shouts "I didn't mean it!" before wilting.

== Cast ==
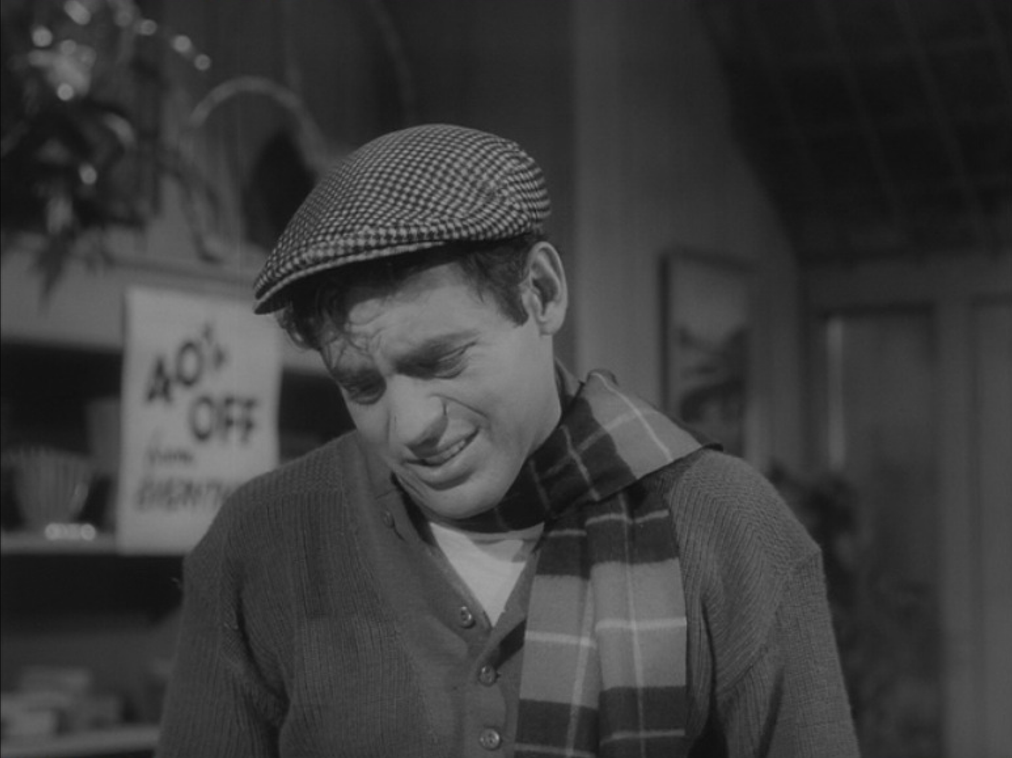
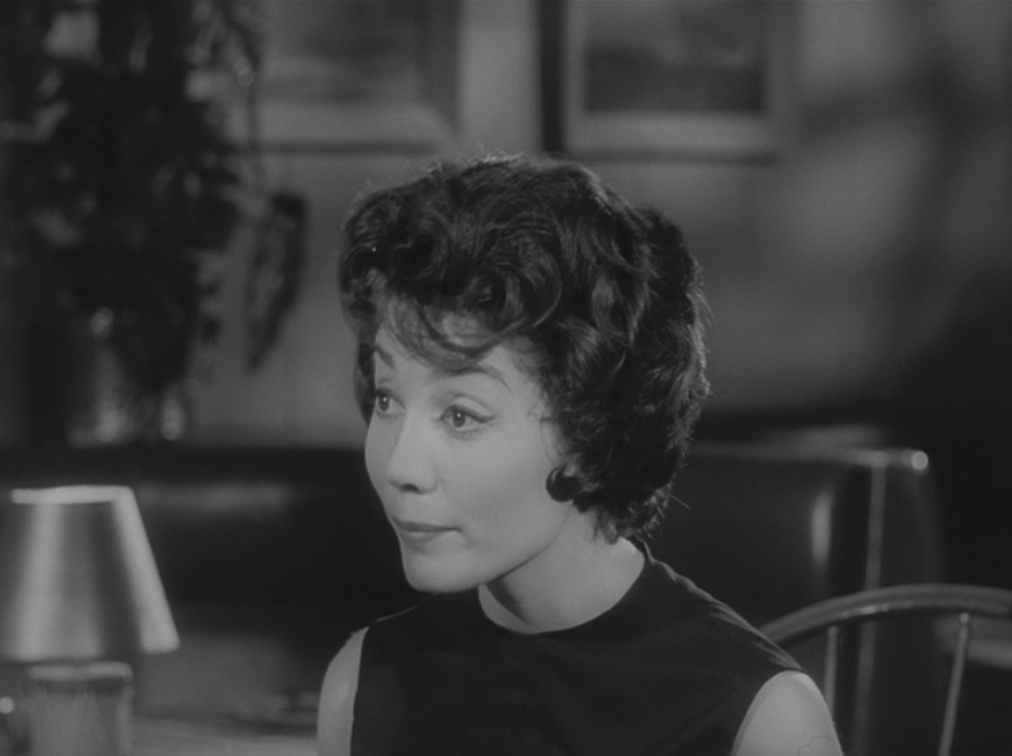
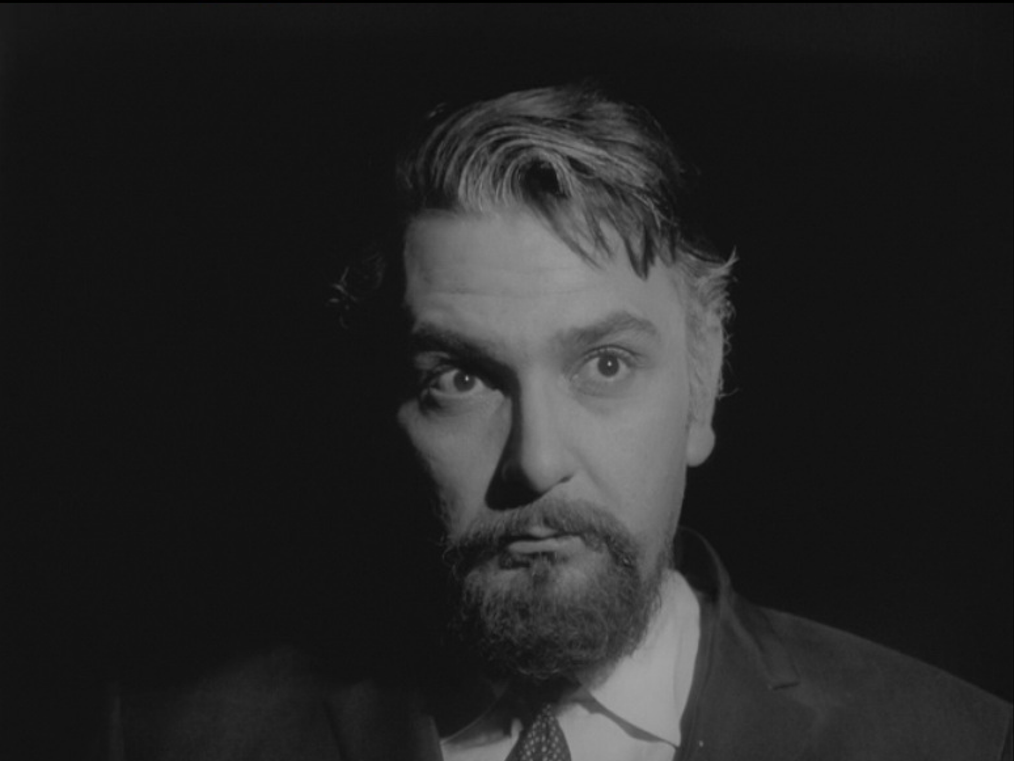
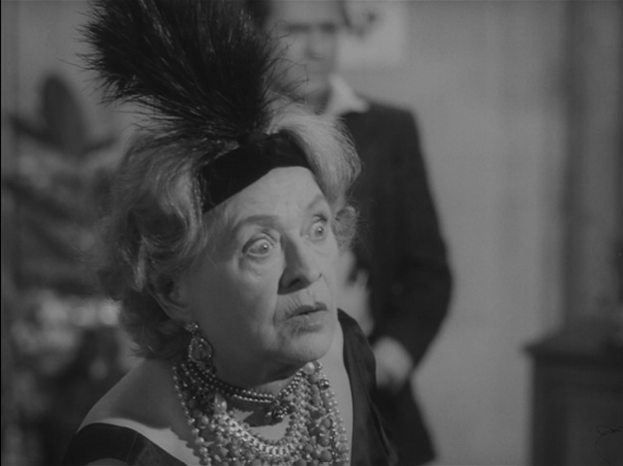
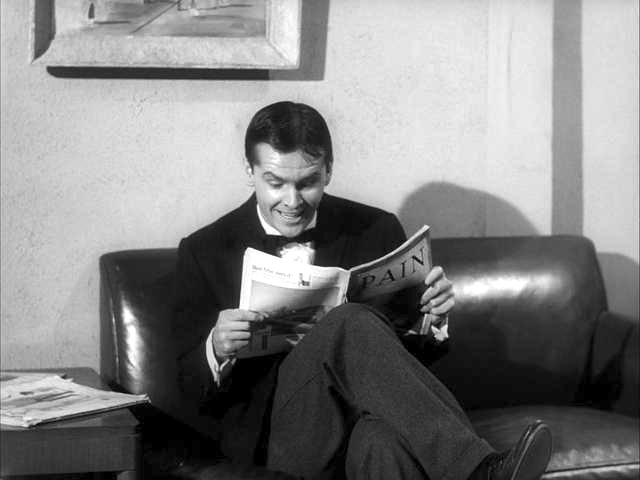
The Little Shop of Horrors introduces (from top) Jonathan Haze as Seymour Krelboined, Jackie Joseph as Audrey Fulquard, Mel Welles as Gravis Mushnick, Myrtle Vail as Winifred Krelboined and Jack Nicholson as Wilbur Force
- Jonathan Haze as Seymour Krelboined, a bumbling employee at a florist shop
- Jackie Joseph as Audrey Fulquard, an employee at a florist shop and Seymour's love interest
- Mel Welles as Gravis Mushnick, the proprietor of a florist shop that Seymour and Audrey work for
- Dick Miller as Burson Fouch
- Myrtle Vail as Winifred Krelboined, Seymour's mother
- Sandra De Bear (credited as Tammy Windsor) as Shirley Plump
- Toby Michaels as Barbara Fridl
- Leola Wendorff as Mrs. Siddie Shiva, a recurring customer at Mushnick's flower shop
- Lynn Storey as Mrs. Hortense Feuchtwanger
- Wally Campo as Sergeant Joe Fink, a police sergeant that investigates the disappearances. He also serves as the narrator of the film recapping the events.
- Jack Warford as Officer Frank Stoolie, a police officer who is Sergeant Fink's partner.
- Meri Welles (as Merri Welles) as Leonora Clyde, a prostitute that gets knocked out and fed to Audrey Jr.
- John Herman Shaner (as John Shaner) as Dr. Phoebus Farb, a dentist
- Jack Nicholson as Wilbur Force
- Dodie Drake as waitress
- Charles B. Griffith as the following roles that were uncredited:
  - The voice of Audrey Jr., a carnivorous plant whose seeds Seymour obtained from a Japanese and is described to resemble a hybrid of a butterwort and a Venus flytrap.
  - A screaming patient of Dr. Farb
  - Kloy Haddock, a robber that tried to rob Mushnik's florist shop
- Jack Griffith as Agony Lush (uncredited)
- Robert Coogan as a undercover detective posing as a tramp at the railroad yard that Seymour accidentally causes the death of (uncredited)

== Development ==
The Little Shop of Horrors was developed when director Roger Corman was given temporary access to sets that had been left standing from his previous film, A Bucket of Blood. Corman decided to use the sets in a film made in the last two days before the sets were torn down.

Corman initially planned to develop a story involving a private investigator. In the story's initial version, the character that eventually became Audrey would have been referred to as "Oriole Plove." Actress Nancy Kulp was a leading candidate for the part. The characters that eventually became Seymour and Winifred Krelborn were named "Irish Eye" and "Iris Eye". Actor Mel Welles was scheduled to play a character named "Draco Cardala," Jonathan Haze was scheduled to play "Archie Aroma," and Jack Nicholson would have played a character named "Jocko".

Charles B. Griffith wanted to write a horror-themed comedy film. According to Mel Welles, Corman was not impressed by the box office performance of A Bucket of Blood, and had to be persuaded to direct another comedy. However, Corman later claimed he was interested because of A Bucket of Blood and said the development process was similar to that of the earlier film, when he and Griffith were inspired by visiting various coffee houses:

We tried a similar approach for The Little Shop of Horrors, dropping in and out of various downtown dives. We ended up at a place where Sally Kellerman (before she became a star) was working as a waitress, and as Chuck and I vied with each other, trying to top each other's sardonic or subversive ideas, appealing to Sally as a referee, she sat down at the table with us, and the three of us worked out the rest of the story together.

The first screenplay Griffith wrote was Cardula, a Dracula-themed story involving a vampire music critic. After Corman rejected the idea, Griffith says he wrote a screenplay titled Gluttony, in which the protagonist was "a salad chef in a restaurant who would wind up cooking customers and stuff like that, you know? We couldn't do that though because of the code at the time. So I said, 'How about a man-eating plant?' and Roger said, 'Okay.' By that time, we were both drunk."

Jackie Joseph later recalled "at first they told me it was a detective movie; then, while I was flying back [to make the movie], I think they wrote a whole new movie, more in the horror genre. I think over a weekend they rewrote it."

The screenplay was written under the title The Passionate People Eater. Welles stated, "The reason that The Little Shop of Horrors worked is because it was a love project. It was our love project." The film's concept may have been inspired by "Green Thoughts", a 1932 story by John Collier about a man-eating plant. Hollywood writer Dennis McDougal suggests that Griffith may have been influenced by Arthur C. Clarke's 1956 science fiction short story "The Reluctant Orchid" (which was in turn inspired by the 1894 H. G. Wells story "The Flowering of the Strange Orchid").

Officers Fink and Stoolie were inspired by Dragnet characters Joe Friday and Frank Smith. The film opens up in a similar format to a Dragnet episode.

== Production ==
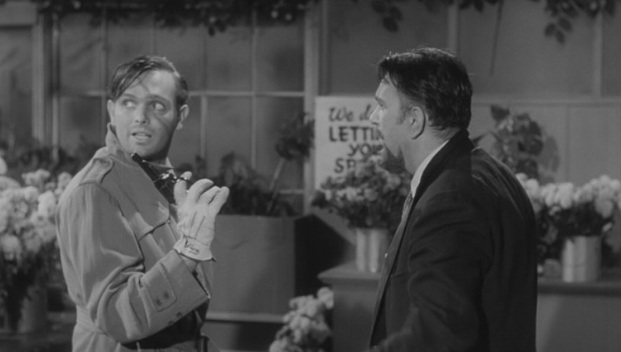
Screenwriter Charles B. Griffith, left, in a cameo role as Kloy Haddock, a robber

The film was partially cast with stock actors that Corman had used in previous films. Writer Charles B. Griffith portrays several small roles. Griffith's father appears as a dental patient, and his grandmother, Myrtle Vail, appears as Seymour's hypochondriac mother. Dick Miller, who had starred as the protagonist of A Bucket of Blood, was offered the role of Seymour, but turned it down, instead taking the smaller role of Burson Fouch. Production at the Bucket of Blood sets was compressed into three days of cast rehearsals, immediately followed by two days and one night of principal photography.

It had been rumored that the film's shooting schedule was based on a bet that Corman could not complete a film within that time. However, this claim has been denied by Mel Welles. According to Joseph, Corman shot the film quickly in order to beat changing industry rules that would have prevented producers from "buying out" an actor's performance in perpetuity. On January 1, 1960, new rules were to go into effect requiring producers to pay all actors residuals for all future releases of their work. This meant that Corman's B-movie business model would be permanently changed and he would not be able to produce low-budget films in the same way. Before these rules went into effect, Corman decided to shoot one last film and scheduled it for the last week in December 1959.

Interiors were shot with three cameras in wide, lingering master shots in single takes. Welles states that Corman "had two camera crews on the set—that's why the picture, from a cinematic standpoint, is really not very well done. The two camera crews were pointed in opposite directions so that we got both angles, and then other shots were 'picked up' to use in between, to make it flow. It was a pretty fixed set and it was done sort of like a sitcom is done today, so it wasn't very difficult."

At the time of shooting, Jack Nicholson had appeared in two films and worked with Roger Corman as the lead in The Cry Baby Killer. According to Nicholson, "I went in to the shoot knowing I had to be very quirky because Roger originally hadn't wanted me. In other words, I couldn't play it straight. So I just did a lot of weird shit that I thought would make it funny." According to Dick Miller, all of the dialogue between his character and Mel Welles was ad-libbed. During a scene in which writer Charles B. Griffith played a robber, Griffith remembers that "When [Welles] and I forgot my lines, I improvised a little, but then I was the writer. I was allowed to." However, Welles states that "Absolutely none of it was ad-libbed [...] every word in Little Shop was written by Chuck Griffith, and I did ninety-eight pages of dialogue in two days."

According to Nicholson, "we never did shoot the end of the scene. This movie was pre-lit. You'd go in, plug in the lights, roll the camera, and shoot. We did the take outside the office and went inside the office, plugged in, lit and rolled. Jonathan Haze was up on my chest pulling my teeth out. And in the take, he leaned back and hit the rented dental machinery with the back of his leg and it started to tip over. Roger didn't even call cut. He leapt onto the set, grabbed the tilting machine, and said 'Next set, that's a wrap.'" By 9 a.m. of the first day, Corman was informed by the production manager that he was behind schedule.

Exteriors were later directed by Griffith and Welles over two successive weekends, with $279 worth of rented equipment. Griffith and Welles paid a group of children five cents apiece to run out of a subway tunnel. They were also able to persuade homeless alcoholics to appear as extras for ten cents apiece. "The winos would get together, two or three of them, and buy pints of wine for themselves! We also had a couple of the winos act as ramrods—sort of like production assistants—and put them in charge of the other wino extras." Griffith and Welles also persuaded a funeral home to donate a hearse and coffin—with a real corpse inside—for the film shoot. Griffith and Welles were able to use the nearby Southern Pacific Transportation Company yard for an entire evening using two bottles of scotch as persuasion. The scene in which a character portrayed by Robert Coogan is run over by a train was accomplished by persuading the railroad crew to back the locomotive away from the actor. The shot was later printed in reverse. Griffith and Welles spent a total of $1,100 on fifteen minutes' worth of exteriors.

The film's musical score, written by cellist Fred Katz, was originally written for A Bucket of Blood. According to Mark Thomas McGee, author of Roger Corman: The Best of the Cheap Acts, each time Katz was called upon to write music for Corman, Katz sold the same score as if it were new music. Katz explained that his music for the film was created by a music editor piecing together selections from other soundtracks that he had produced for Corman.

Howard R. Cohen learned from Charles B. Griffith that when the film was being edited, "there was a point where two scenes would not cut together. It was just a visual jolt, and it didn't work. And they needed something to bridge that moment. They found in the editing room a nice shot of the moon, and they cut it in, and it worked. Twenty years go by. I'm at the studio one day. Chuck comes running up to me, says, 'You've got to see this!' It was a magazine article—eight pages on the symbolism of the moon in Little Shop of Horrors." According to Corman, the total budget for the production was $30,000. Other sources estimate the budget to be between $22,000 and $100,000.

== Release and reception ==
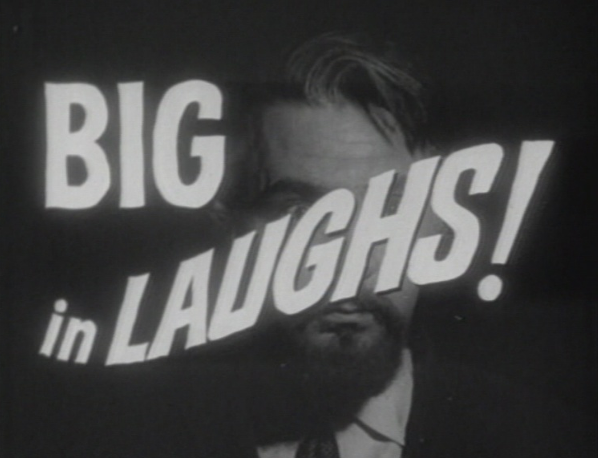
The film's trailer emphasized its comedic content

=== Release history ===
Corman had initial trouble finding distribution for the film, as some distributors, including American International Pictures (AIP), felt that the film would be interpreted as anti-Semitic, citing the characters of Gravis Mushnick and Siddie Shiva. Welles, who was Jewish, stated that he gave his character a Turkish Jewish accent and mannerisms, and that he saw the humor of the film as playful, and felt there was no intent to defame any ethnic group. The film was finally released by its production company, The Filmgroup, nine months after it had been completed.

The Little Shop of Horrors was screened out of competition at the 1960 Cannes Film Festival on the strength of its reviews in trade papers. Mel Welles had sent these to the festival, which asked for a print of the film.

A year later, AIP distributed the film as the B movie for its release of Mario Bava's Black Sunday. Despite being barely mentioned in advertising (it was only occasionally referred to as an "Added Attraction" to Bava's film), Black Sunday's critical and commercial success resulted in positive word of mouth responses to The Little Shop of Horrors. The film was re-released again the following year in a double feature with Last Woman on Earth.

Because Corman did not believe that The Little Shop of Horrors had much financial prospect after its initial theatrical run, he did not bother to copyright it, resulting in the film entering the public domain. Because of this, the film is widely available in copies of varying quality. The film was originally screened theatrically in the widescreen aspect ratio of 1.85:1, but has largely only been seen in open matte at an aspect ratio of 1.33:1 since its original theatrical release.

=== Critical and audience reception ===
The film's critical reception was largely favorable. On the review aggregator website Rotten Tomatoes, the film holds an approval rating of 89% based 19 reviews, with an average rating of 6.4/10. Variety wrote, "The acting is pleasantly preposterous. [...] Horticulturalists and vegetarians will love it."

Jack Nicholson, recounting the reaction to a screening of the film, states that the audience "laughed so hard I could barely hear the dialogue. I didn't quite register it right. It was as if I had forgotten it was a comedy since the shoot. I got all embarrassed because I'd never really had such a positive response before."

In his book Comedy-Horror Films: A Chronological History, 1914–2008, Bruce G. Hallenbeck called the film "one of Corman's gems, an idea that was born on 'a night out on the town' that's every bit as loony as it sounds." He cited the hilarious performances delivered by the ensemble cast and Corman's strong results while working under the self-imposed pressures of a cheap budget and a fast shooting schedule.

=== Legacy ===
The film's popularity slowly grew with local television broadcasts throughout the 1960s and 1970s. Interest in the film was rekindled when a stage musical adaptation called Little Shop of Horrors was produced in 1982. It was based on the original film and was itself adapted to cinema as Little Shop of Horrors in 1986. A short-lived animated television series, Little Shop, about a teenage boy and his giant talking plant, was adapted from the 1960 film, but incorporated elements from the musical. By 2024, Joe Dante and Roger Corman were working on a spin-off film to be titled Little Shop of Halloween Horrors. Dante was set to direct with Charles S. Haas writing the script. Corman, who died in May of that year, would have produced the film with Brad Krevoy. In 2025, Dante announced that the film had been shelved.

== See also ==
- List of cult films
- Attack of the Killer Tomatoes
