= Pamela Duncan (actress) =

American actress

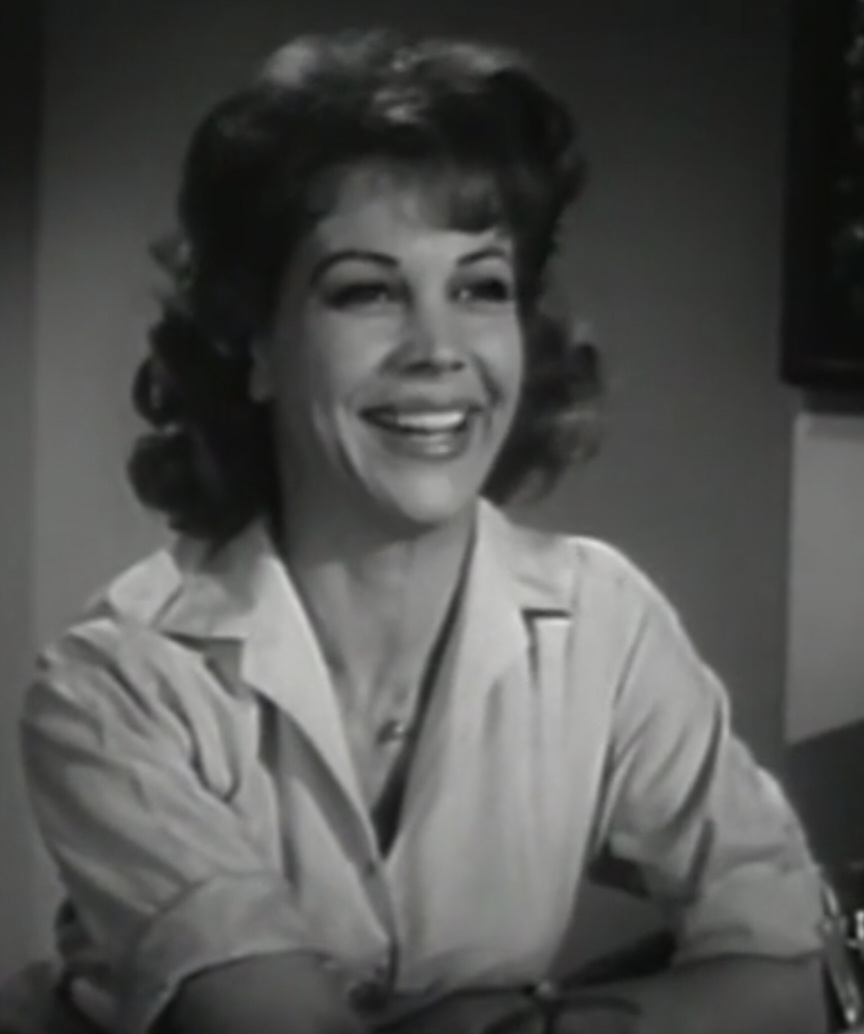
- Duncan in an episode of Lock-Up (1960)
- Born: December 28, 1924; Brooklyn, New York, U.S.
- Died: November 11, 2005 (aged 80); Englewood, New Jersey, U.S.
- Occupation: Actress
- Years active: 1951–1964

Pamela Duncan (December 28, 1924 – November 11, 2005) was an American B-movie actress who notably starred in two 1957 cult films for Roger Corman: Attack of the Crab Monsters and The Undead. She later appeared in the 2000 Academy Award-nominated documentary, Curtain Call, that focused on the lives and careers of the residents of the Lillian Booth Actors Home in Englewood, New Jersey.

== Biography ==
A native of Brooklyn, New York, Duncan won several local beauty pageants as a teenager. She attended Hunter College and Columbia University before moving to Southern California in 1951 to get into film acting.

Duncan worked three years in summer stock theatre. Her first role came when she appeared in the 1951 film Whistling Hills. Also in the 1950s, she played the part of Mike Hammer's secretary Velda in the mystery drama My Gun Is Quick.

On television, Duncan appeared in more than 200 programs and 100 telefilms. In 1958 she appeared on Perry Mason as the murder victim and title character in "The Case of the Daring Decoy." Other television appearances included General Electric Theater, Studio One,Dangerous Assignment,The Philco Television Playhouse, Fireside Theatre, Dragnet, Dr. Kildare, The Adventures of Rin Tin Tin, Pony Express, Highway Patrol, Maverick, M Squad, The Life and Legend of Wyatt Earp, Colt .45, Laramie, The Roy Rogers Show, Suspense, Captain Video, Tombstone Territory, Sea Hunt, Rawhide, Tales of Wells Fargo in the episode "The Silver Bullets" and, in 1959, in Bat Masterson as Rachel Lowery in the episode "Lady Luck."

In still another 1959 appearance, Duncan was cast as traveling show performer "Princess Nadja" in the episode "RX: Slow Death" on the syndicated anthology series, Death Valley Days, hosted by the "Old Ranger" (Stanley Andrews). She played Lupe Ortega on that series the previous year in S6 E15 "Yankee Pirate".

On November 11, 2005, Duncan died from a stroke at the Lillian Booth Actors Home in Englewood, New Jersey, where she had lived for ten years. She was 80.

== Filmography ==
| Year | Title | Role | Notes |
|---|---|---|---|
| 1951 | Whistling Hills | Cora - Waitress | |
| 1951 | Lawless Cowboys | Nora Clayton | |
| 1952 | Confidence Girl | Braddock's Nurse | Uncredited |
| 1952 | The Ring | Frances - Carhop | Uncredited |
| 1953 | A Blueprint for Murder | Nurse | Uncredited |
| 1954 | Dragonfly Squadron | Anne Taylor | |
| 1954 | The Saracen Blade | Zenobia | |
| 1954 | Return from the Sea | Nurse | |
| 1956 | Seven Men from Now | Señorita Nellie | |
| 1956 | Julie | Peggy Davis | Uncredited |
| 1957 | Attack of the Crab Monsters | Martha Hunter | |
| 1957 | The Undead | Diana Love / Helene | |
| 1957 | My Gun Is Quick | Velda, Hammer's Secretary | |
| 1957 | Gun Battle at Monterey | Maria Salvador | |
| 1959 | Don't Give Up the Ship | Lt. Ward | Uncredited |
| 1959 | Career | Myra Holloway | Uncredited |
| 1961 | Summer and Smoke | Pearl | Uncredited |
| 1962 | Girls! Girls! Girls! | Cigarette Girl | Uncredited |
