= Mark Hanna (screenwriter) =

American screenwriter

Mark Hanna (January 1, 1917 – October 16, 2003) was an American screenwriter and actor. He was known for writing the screenplays for many science fiction B movies in the 1950s, particularly Attack of the 50 Foot Woman. His first major screenplay was Gunslinger in 1956. He continued to be prolific through the mid-1960s, after which his film credits become sporadic. His last screenplay was for Star Portal in 1998, five years before his death from stroke complications.

== Writing credits ==
- Gunslinger (1956) – with Charles B. Griffith
- Not of This Earth (1956) – with Charles B. Griffith
- Flesh and the Spur (1956) – Charles B. Griffith
- The Undead (1956) – with Charles B. Griffith
- Naked Paradise (1957) – with Charles B. Griffith
- The Amazing Colossal Man (1957) - with Bert I. Gordon and George Worthing Yates
- Jet Attack (1958) - story
- Attack of the 50 Foot Woman (1958)
- Raymie (1960)
- Rebellion in Cuba (1961)
- Blood on the Arrow (1964) - story
- The Gatling Gun (1971) - with Joseph Van Winkle
- Slaughter (1972) - with Don Williams
- Star Portal (1997)
