= Not of This Earth (1988 film) =

1988 film by Jim Wynorski

- Theatrical release poster
- Directed by: Jim Wynorski
- Screenplay by: R.J. Robertson; Jim Wynorski
- Based on: Not of This Earth by Charles B. Griffith and Mark Hanna
- Produced by: Murray Miller; Jim Wynorski
- Starring: Traci Lords; Arthur Roberts; Lenny Juliano; Rebecca Perle
- Cinematography: Zoran Hochstätter
- Edited by: Kevin Tent
- Music by: Chuck Cirino
- Production companies: Miracle Pictures; Pacific Trust
- Distributed by: Concorde Pictures
- Release date: May 13, 1988 (United States)
- Running time: 81 minutes
- Country: United States
- Language: English
- Budget: $296,000

Not of This Earth is a 1988 American science fiction horror comedy film, directed by Jim Wynorski and starring Traci Lords in her first mainstream role after her departure from the adult film industry. It is a remake of Roger Corman's 1957 film of the same name, written by Charles B. Griffith and Mark Hanna. Not of This Earth was made as a result of a wager where Wynorski bet he could remake the film in the same (inflation-adjusted) budget and schedule as the 1957 version by Corman.

== Plot ==
Nadine Story (Traci Lords) is a nurse working in the office of Dr. Rochelle (Ace Mask). She encounters an unusual patient Mr. Johnson (Arthur Roberts), who is always dressed in black, wears dark sunglasses and demands a blood transfusion. After Dr. Rochelle tests Johnson's blood, he's surprised to discover the man's body isn't producing blood in the usual manner, and Johnson hires Nadine to work in his home and give him regular transfusions. With the help of her boyfriend Harry (Roger Lodge), she soon discovers that Johnson is an emissary from the planet Davanna, who is looking for a ready supply of human blood his people need to survive.

== Cast ==
- Traci Lords as Nadine Story
- Arthur Roberts as Mr. Paul Johnson
- Lenny Juliano as Jeremy
- Ace Mask as Dr. Rochelle
- Roger Lodge as Harry
- Rebecca Perle as Davanna Girl
- Michael DeLano as Vacuum Cleaner Salesman
- Becky LeBeau as Happy Birthday Girl
- Monique Gabrielle as Agnes
- Kelli Maroney as Nurse Oxford

== Production ==
Director Jim Wynorski first got the idea of remaking the film after he found an original print of Roger Corman's 1957 original. He wagered that he could remake the film on the original shooting schedule and budget, adjusted for inflation. The film was reportedly originally going to be a musical comedy.

When it came to casting for the film, Wynorski said he came up with who should play the lead almost immediately:

While we were at an optical house doing some effects work for Big Bad Mama II (1987), I came across an original print of the old Corman film. Kelli Maroney was there, and Raven, and we had a big hoot watching it. So I said "I think we could have a blast remaking this picture." And they said "Well, who are you going to get to play the Beverly Garland part?" There were some newspapers lying around, and I saw a story in one of them about Traci Lords. So I said "Let's get Traci Lords!" She even looks a little bit like Beverly Garland.

Wynorski said, "It was not easy to find her because she was not with any agencies, she was in hiding. I found her and convinced her to do it." The director admitted part of the reason he cast Lords in the film was because he knew it would result in a certain amount of publicity. But he ended up being impressed with her acting ability, saying, "believe it or not she can act. And she's trying to change her image."

Filming took 12 days. Wynorski finished one day ahead of schedule so used the last day to refilm some of Lord's scenes. "She'd improved so much since the first day of filming", said the director. Like any number of Roger Corman productions, this one includes scenes lifted from earlier films as filler, such as the dog in the foggy woods and the woman being stalked from outside her home, as originally seen in Humanoids from the Deep, as well as the scene of the caped, knife-wielding stalker from Hollywood Boulevard.

== Release ==
The film was very popular on video. Wynorski said he bought a new house out of his share of the profits.

=== Critical reception ===
The film received mixed reviews from critics. Los Angeles Times wrote the film was "a curiosity that definitely entertains", and pointed out that it was a "pretty decent stab at poking gentle fun at budget-genre film making." They added that it was also "old-fashioned, silly, slap-dash and innocently bold." The writer also added: "The surprising aspect of ex-porn actress Lords' casting is that she actually appears to have a natural flair for comedy. She and the other performers push hard against the campy underpinnings of the film but manage not to step into the realm of the inane."

Traci Lords' acting was one of the aspects of the film that received universal acclaim, with The Hollywood Reporter remarking "The answer is yes. She can act."

=== Home media ===
On May 22, 2001, New Concorde released the film on DVD and VHS.

On November 2, 2010, Shout! Factory released the film on DVD as part of its Roger Corman's Cult Classics collection.
