= Smokey Bites the Dust =

- Theatrical poster
- Directed by: Charles B. Griffith
- Written by: Max Apple
- Produced by: Roger Corman
- Starring: Jimmy McNichol; Janet Julian; Walter Barnes
- Music by: Bent Myggen
- Production company: Brent Walker Film Productions
- Distributed by: New World Pictures
- Release date: October 1981
- Running time: 87 minutes
- Country: United States
- Language: English

Smokey Bites the Dust is a 1981 car chase film from New World Pictures directed by Charles B. Griffith. Despite the title, the film is not connected to the Smokey and the Bandit series.

== Plot ==
The stock plot deals with Roscoe Wilton, a teenage joyriding car thief, evading Cyco County Sheriff Turner and his unintelligent deputies.

Turner becomes even more obsessed with catching Roscoe after he kidnaps his overly-sheltered daughter, Peggy Sue, just as she is about to be crowned homecoming Queen during a football game at their high school. In so doing, Roscoe also makes himself a target of other characters, including his best friend Harold, Peggy Sue's friend Cindy, and Kenny, a sanctimonious quarterback who is deeply, but vainly, in love with Peggy Sue.

While Roscoe is being chased by Sheriff Turner, Turner himself incurs the wrath of neighboring Knotsie County Sheriff Sherm Bleed after commandeering one of Bleed's cruisers. Turner's pursuit of Roscoe (and Peggy Sue, who quickly begins to enjoy being in Roscoe's company) goes through two other neighboring counties, with Turner commandeering several other police cruisers and civilian cars only to wreck each one in spectacular fashion.

=== Subplots ===
- Lester, a local moonshiner is looking to sell his "secret formula" to an Arab oil sheik for "a million clams"; the deal falls through when it turns out the sheik brought actual clams instead of money.
- Harold and Cindy share a car as they join in the chase; Harold to get his dad's car back from Roscoe, and Cindy to give Peggy Sue her crown. As the chase progresses, Harold and Cindy begin to fall for one another, similar to Roscoe and Peggy Sue.
- At a nearby truck stop, a preteen girl is willing to let Roscoe and Peggy Sue steal her father's station wagon (with boat in tow) in exchange for a carton of cigarettes. The girl appears several times more throughout the film, including near the end when everyone converges on Snake Lake Beach in a chaotic free-for-all; watching from a distance, the girl muses, "What, I ask you, is the point in growing up?".
- Kenny's infatuation with Peggy Sue motivates him to chase the elusive couple on his own in an attempt to rescue her; he even goes so far as to run other police cruisers off the road just so he can save Peggy Sue himself. After the fight on the beach, Kenny is eventually "arrested" by the female sheriff of neighboring Belladonna County.

== Cast ==
- Jimmy McNichol as Roscoe Wilton
- Janet Julian as Peggy Sue Turner
- Walter Barnes as Sheriff Hugh "Smokey" Turner
- Patrick Campbell as Lester
- Kari Lizer as Cindy
- John Blyth Barrymore as Harold
- William Forsythe (credited as 'Bill Forsythe') as Kenny
- Kedric Wolfe as Deputy Bentley
- Charles Howerton as Sheriff Sherman "Sherm" Bleed
- Tony Cox as Desk Clerk

== Production ==
Though the majority of the cars used in filming had California licence plates, the exact location of the storyline was more ambiguous; film dialogue mentioned the boonies, which generally refers to the Appalachian region, and also mentioned running off to "east St. Louis or west to Colorado". Near the end of the film, Roscoe suggests they hotwire a boat and take off for St. Louis or New Orleans, both of which are on the Mississippi River.

Charles B. Griffith had made a popular film for Roger Corman's New World Pictures called Eat My Dust! (1976). Corman wanted Griffith to make a follow-up called Car Wars using stunt footage from five old New World films. Griffith wrote a script which he later called Wham Bam, Merci, Madame, which he says Corman rejected. However a few years later he reactivated the project.

He called again and offered me a lot more money than he ever had before. I guess I got flattered, and I went ahead and did it. He had Max Apple in Texas go ahead and write a script around all the wrecks and chases. But Max wasn't allowed to see the footage. It was too expensive to rent a Movieola and send Max prints or anything else, so he had only vague descriptions written down on what the stunts were—and nothing worked. So I made a lot of changes in it, and that made Roger angry. He tried to cut it just to the action of the old pictures, but he couldn't, because he needed all the distribution rights. Then he cut all the motivations and all the character development. It was a mess, a jumbled mess!

Apple later described the experience: "They wanted four or five crashes, of which they already had the footage. It was more bricklaying than writing.
