= Flesh and the Spur =

1956 film by Edward L. Cahn

- Theatrical release poster by Albert Kallis
- Directed by: Edward L. Cahn
- Written by: Charles B. Griffith; Mark Hanna additional dialogue Lou Rusoff; Edward L. Cahn
- Based on: story by Charles B. Griffith; Mark Hanna
- Produced by: Alex Gordon executive Touch Connors; Charles John Lyons, Jr.
- Starring: John Agar; Marla English; Touch Connors
- Cinematography: Frederick E. West
- Edited by: Robert S. Eisen
- Music by: Ronald Stein
- Production company: Hy Productions
- Distributed by: American International Pictures
- Release date: September 25, 1956 (United States)
- Running time: 78 minutes
- Country: United States
- Language: English
- Budget: $117,000

Flesh and the Spur is a 1956 American Western film directed by Edward L. Cahn. The film stars John Agar as Lucius Random, Marla English as Wild Willow, and Mike Connors (billed here as Touch Connors) as Stacy Tanner. The film was released by American International Pictures as a double feature with Naked Paradise. The plot is about a young cowboy who searches for the killer of his twin brother.

== Plot ==
Tanner is a desperate prisoner who escapes from jail and promptly murders an innocent farmer named Matthew Random. Stealing Random's horse and gun, the outlaw promptly makes his escape. Finding his twin brother murdered, Lucius Random (Agar) vows revenge and sets off to find the killer.

Although he does not know the identity of the killer, Random knows that he is part of the nefarious "Checker Gang" and can be identified by the gun he stole from Matthew, which is one of a unique set of two that the brothers Matthew and Lucius owned between them.

== Cast ==
- John Agar as Luke Random/Matthew Random
- Marla English as Willow
- Touch Connors as Stacey Doggett
- Raymond Hatton as Windy
- Maria Monay as Lola
- Joyce Meadows as Rena
- Kenne Duncan as Cale Tanner
- Frank Lackteen as Indian chief
- Mel Gaines as Blackie
- Michael Harris as Deputy marshal
- Eddie Kafafian as Bud
- Kermit Maynard as Outlaw

== Production ==
The film was originally titled Dead Man's Gun.

Mike Connors also acted as executive producer and raised the money with Charles Lyons from Armenian friends for the film's $117,000 budget. He recalled being called in to a meeting with AIP's James H. Nicholson, Samuel Z. Arkoff, and Alex Gordon. They showed him a poster of leading lady Marla English tied to a stake with fire ants crawling on her. Connors remarked that no such scene was in the script. The AIP heads replied that the movie had been presold on the basis of Albert Kallis' artwork, and that the anthill torture scene would be written in later. (This was a marketing ploy frequently used by AIP to promote films during preproduction, often before the screenplay had been written.) Alex Gordon recalled dropping ants on the bound and gagged Marla. However, the ants would promptly run away from her. The ungagged Marla finally asked Gordon, "Look, you've got six ants there, isn't that enough??"

== Release ==
The film was released on a double bill with Naked Paradise. Although popular, it was the last Western made by AIP, which preferred to concentrate on genres more specifically targeted at the teenaged audience. Marla English retired soon after making the film.

== Reception ==
A contemporary review of the film in Variety reported that the film "is an unexciting Western, burdened with trite dialog and drawn-out situations," noting further that "Cahn's direction is unable to hurdle the dull aspects of the script, with the result that none of the players shows to advantage...Agar is lifeless." A review in TV Guide described the film as an "empty western" with an "uneventful plot." Critic Mark Franklin wrote that "the film is marked by snappy dialogue, an outlaw gang as inept as they come, and poorly conceived and choreographed action scenes," adding that "Connors steals the show as the devil-may-care vengeance seeker. Which isn't difficult considering Agar's wooden performance."

== Home media ==
On October 27, 2009, Alpha Video released Flesh and the Spur on Region 0 DVD.
