= Jonathan Haze =

American actor (1929–2024)

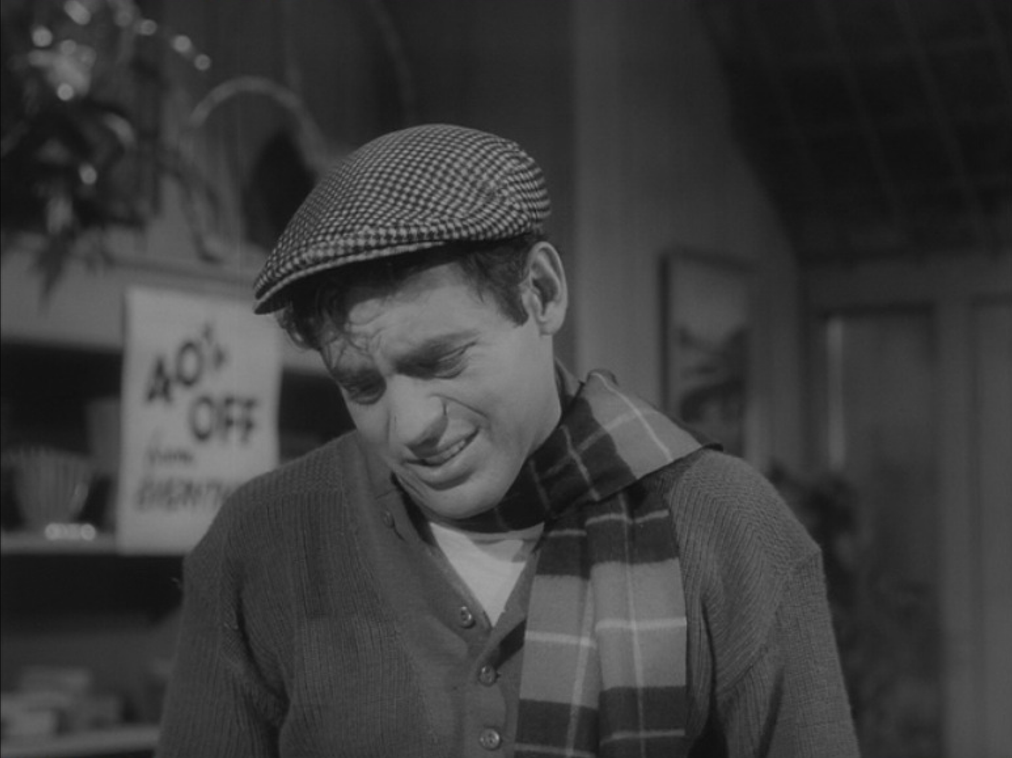
- Haze in The Little Shop of Horrors (1960)
- Born: Jack Aaron Schachter; April 1, 1929; Pittsburgh, Pennsylvania, U.S.
- Died: November 2, 2024 (aged 95); Los Angeles, California, U.S.
- Occupation: Actor
- Years active: 1949–2010
- Known for: Seymour Krelboined in The Little Shop of Horrors
- Spouse: Roberta Keith (m. 1960; div. 1981)
- Children: 2
- Relatives: Buddy Rich (cousin)

Jonathan Haze (born Jack Aaron Schachter; April 1, 1929 – November 2, 2024) was an American actor, producer, and screenwriter. He is best known for his work in Roger Corman films, especially the 1960 black comedy cult classic The Little Shop of Horrors, in which he played florist's assistant Seymour Krelboined.

== Early years ==
Haze was born Jack Schachter in Pittsburgh, Pennsylvania, on April 1, 1929, to Betty and Harry Schachter, who was a jeweller. His cousin was jazz drummer Buddy Rich.

== Early career ==
Haze was working at a gas station in California when he was discovered by Wyott Ordung. Ordung was directing the movie Monster from the Ocean Floor (1954), which was being produced by Corman, and offered a small part to Haze.

Corman, three years Haze's senior, was impressed and cast Haze in many of his films over the next ten years, including Apache Woman (1955), Day the World Ended (1955), Gunslinger (1956), The Oklahoma Woman (1956), It Conquered the World (1956), Swamp Women (1956), Naked Paradise (1957), Not of This Earth (1957), Rock All Night (1957), The Viking Women and the Sea Serpent (1957), Carnival Rock (1957), The Little Shop of Horrors (1960), and The Terror (1963).

Haze also appeared in non-Corman films, such as Bayou (1957), Stakeout on Dope Street (1958), Ghost of the China Sea (1958), and Forbidden Island (1959).

== Later work ==
In 1959, Haze guest starred in the episode "Terror Town" of NBC's western television series Cimarron City, starring George Montgomery. Dan Duryea who portrayed the mastermind of a criminal enterprise in silver who is the half-brother of Haze's character.

Haze later branched into other aspects of filmmaking. In 1957, Haze sold his first screenplay to Arrarat Productions. Titled The Monster of Nicholson Mesa, the film was a parody of horror films. He wrote the 1962 science fiction/comedy film Invasion of the Star Creatures. He also worked in production for such films as Premature Burial (1962), The Terror (1963), Medium Cool (1969), Another Nice Mess (1972), and Corman's own The Born Losers (1967).

== Personal life and death ==
Haze was married to costume designer Roberta Keith from the mid-1960s until 1981, and they had two daughters.

Haze died at his home in Los Angeles, on November 2, 2024, at the age of 95.
