= Gunslinger (film) =

1956 film by Roger Corman

- Film poster by Reynold Brown
- Directed by: Roger Corman
- Screenplay by: Charles B. Griffith; Mark Hanna
- Produced by: Roger Corman
- Starring: John Ireland; Beverly Garland; Allison Hayes
- Cinematography: Frederick E. West
- Edited by: Charles Gross
- Music by: Ronald Stein
- Production company: Roger Corman Productions
- Distributed by: American Releasing Corporation
- Release date: October 1956
- Running time: 77 minutes
- Country: United States
- Language: English

Gunslinger is a 1956 American Western film directed by Roger Corman and starring John Ireland, Beverly Garland and Allison Hayes. The screenplay was written by Mark Hanna and Charles B. Griffith.

The film began production in February 1956, as director Corman wanted to shoot one final film in six days before a change in union contracts meant that actors were limited to working only five days a week. Filming of Gunslinger was marred by several inconveniences; rain caused the filming location to become muddy, and the two lead actresses were both injured on set. Eventually, Gunslinger was released to mixed reviews, and, in 1993, was featured in a fifth-season episode of the film-mocking comedy television series Mystery Science Theater 3000.

== Plot ==
After her husband Scott, the town marshal of Oracle, Texas, is killed by two assailants, Rose Hood shoots one of men and is named temporary marshal until the renowned Sam Bass arrives to take the job. At the funeral, she spots and shoots the second killer.

That night, Rose asks Erica Page to close her saloon at 3 a.m. in accordance with town regulations, but Erica insists that her saloon is open 24 hours. After the women fight, Erica capitulates and closes for the night. She tells lackey Jake to hire a gunslinger, and he finds Cane Miro. In the saloon, Mayor Polk tells Erica that she has overextended herself by buying property along a proposed railroad track, but she dismisses his warnings.

As Cane rides toward town, Rose shoots at him, mistaking him for a Nate Signo, a man whom she has been seeking. She apologizes and they ride together to find Signo, and Cane shoots him. Cane enters the saloon and confronts Polk. Erica reveals that she paid Cane to kill Rose, but she states that if the proposed railroad track is a success, Rose may not have to die.

Erica buys a freight line from Zebulon Taub for $15,000 but has Jake follow him. Rose follows Cane as he exits town. He stops and they talk and eventually kiss. Jake finds and kills Taub and reclaims the money. When Rose and Cane arrive, Erica becomes jealous and irate. She demands that Jake kill Rose immediately. Cane reminds her that they cannot change the deal they made.

Cane tells Rose that he has come to see Mayor Polk, who was his former military commander. At a pivotal battle, Polk had panicked and fled, leaving his men, including Cane's four brothers, to be captured or killed. Rose makes Cane promise not to harm Polk, but has Polk placed in protective custody.

Three of Erica's dance-hall girls whom Rose had banished from the town ambush Rose and try to hang her. However, Cane rescues her from the girls, who leave town. Cane becomes intoxicated and kisses Erica. Jake, who has been spying, sees the kiss but leaves before Erica is rejected by Cane. Erica orders Cane to kill Rose. When she returns to her saloon, Jake slaps her and Erica vows that she will kill him. Jake seeks Rose and tells her everything that he knows. Back at the saloon, Jake draws a gun on Cane, who kills him. Rose does not arrest him, as Erica claims that the murder was in self-defense.

After stealing a letter informing her that the railroad will not be built, killing the messenger in the process, Erica rides into town, intending to have Cane kill Rose. Deputy Joshua Tate is killed when he confronts them. Cane attacks Polk, killing his wife when she shields him. Cane then shoots and kills Polk.

Rose enters town and Erica aims at her, but Erica is shot by Cane before she can pull the trigger. Rose pursues Cane out of town, and they exchange fire. Rose shoots Cane, and as he bleeds out he asks Rose if she reciprocates his feelings for her, and she replies that she did. Cane's wound is fatal, and Rose rides out of Oracle, declaring she will never return. Sam Bass arrives just as she leaves and asks her whether the town is quiet, and she confirms without breaking stride or looking back.

== Cast ==
- Beverly Garland as Marshal Rose Hood
- John Ireland as Cane Miro
- Allison Hayes as Erica Page
- Martin Kingsley as Mayor Gideon Polk
- Jonathan Haze as Jake Hayes
- Margaret Campbell as Felicity Polk
- Bruno VeSota as Zebelon Tabb
- Chris Alcaide as Deputy Joshua Tate
- Dick Miller as Jimmy Tonto
- William Schallert as Marshal Scott Hood
- Kermit Maynard as Barfly

== Production ==
=== Development ===
The screenplay for Gunslinger was written by Mark Hanna and Charles B. Griffith based on an idea by director Roger Corman, who proposed a Western film in which a sheriff is murdered while on duty, with the sheriff's widow inheriting the job. Griffith was hired after Jonathan Haze showed several of Griffith's screenplays to Corman.

Griffith had written two Westerns for Corman that had not been made. Griffith said: "He took me out to see Three Hours to Kill with Dana Andrews and said to me, 'I want you to do the same picture but with a woman as the sheriff'."

Corman later said, "I'm weary of prepackaged formulas, and when you try out a new idea, you necessarily think about shooting a hackneyed scene in a funny way without resorting to parody. This wasn't a parody, it was 'Good God, how can I find a different sort of gunslinger?' Right away, I thought of a woman gunslinger, and the idea for the script came to me all of a sudden. It was the sheriff's wife. He's killed and she takes over for her husband. It was logical when it wasn't, but that was enough for a six-or seven-day Western."

The film was originally known as The Yellow Rose of Texas.

=== Filming ===
Gunslinger began production on January 22, 1956. The International Alliance of Theatrical Stage Employees and the film studios had renegotiated for a five-day work week instead of six days, and Corman wished to film a low-budget Western in six days before the new contract took effect, with Gene Corman providing half of the financing. The film was shot at the Jack Ingram Western Movie Ranch in Topanga, California, but it rained for five days during the shoot. As a result, the filming took seven days instead of six. The rain made the area muddy, causing trucks, cameras and lighting equipment to sink.

Because of the quick shooting schedule, the rain forced several exterior scenes to be rewritten in order to be shot indoors. Other scenes were shot with a large tarp draped over the actors. Corman overcame the audible rainfall in the background by employing the film's score and an assortment of sound effects to cover the noise. The first sequence shot was a love scene between Beverly Garland and John Ireland in a tree. The tree's colony of red ants crawled on the actors and repeatedly bit them.

Actors were injured several times on set. One day, Allison Hayes' horse slipped in the mud, causing her to fall and breaking her arm. While the crew waited for an ambulance to arrive, Corman shot a reel of closeups of Hayes, intending to splice the shots into the final cut while using a double to shoot other scenes.

While filming a scene, Garland twisted her ankle running down the stairs in the saloon but continued. Her ankle later swelled to twice its normal size. When she returned to the set, the crew cut the back of the boot and taped it to her foot.

While Corman described the production of Gunslinger as "one of the worst experiences of my life" and Hayes wanted to leave the film during shooting, Garland considered Rose Hood among her favorite roles, noting:

I think I was the first woman to play a marshal in a movie Western. Roger would often cast against type in those days. I could never resist a plum role like a lady marshal in a genre that would never have considered such a gender reversal like that before. However, working with Roger was always an adventure and this film was no exception.

Corman later said:

My Texas distributor arrived in the city where I was filming and asked me how it was going. I told him that I thought that it was good but that there was too much violence and passion, and he answered, "Roger, I've been in this business for forty years, and you've been in it for just two. Let me tell you that no one has ever made a film with too much passion and violence." So I pressed on. Everyone was dying. At the end of the film half of the city was dead.

== Release ==
=== Reception ===
Gunslinger was released in October 1956.

The Hollywood Reporter called it "quite a startling Western" and praised the two lead actresses, saying "Miss Garland and Hayes are good as the feuding ladies from different sides of the tracks."

Variety wrote that "with such a twist to the conventional Western plot, this Roger Corman production should get its share of playing time attention in the program market."

VideoHound's Golden Movie Retriever praised Gunslinger for being a "unique Western with a surprise ending." In The Encyclopedia of Western Movies, Gunslinger was praised for exploring the potential of a woman gunfighter, and that it was "the most assured of Corman's quartet of Westerns." In his book Western Movies: A Guide to 5,105 Feature Films, Michael R. Pitts said that it was an "early six day Roger Corman cheapie that is rather appealing."

Bill Gibron wrote a negative review for DVD Verdict: "Roger Corman was responsible for a lot of smoldering cinematic cowflops over the course of his economically sound career, but Gunslinger has got to be one of the most overripe and ridiculous." While he stated that "Beverly Garland, who plays our dispassionate Rose, and John Ireland, as the cool and callous Cane Myro, are decent enough", he wrote that "there isn't much to recommend in this movie", saying that "there's too much unresolved intrigue, too many easy answers to rotten questions, to make heads or tails of what is supposed to matter." TV Guide awarded Gunslinger two stars, writing that "it's a strange little Corman film, made before he went wholeheartedly for horror films, and this too has a semi-sense of the strange." Film reviewer Leonard Maltin awarded Gunslinger one star and a half.

Filmink said "There are terrific moments, like Garland spotting one of her husband's killers at her husband's funeral and plugging the guy then and there – but if I'm being honest, Corman's direction back then wasn't up to the quality of his script or cast."

=== Home media ===
Gunslinger was released on DVD by Optimum Home Entertainment on September 15, 2008 as part of Roger Corman: The Collection, which includes five other Corman films: Five Guns West, The Haunted Palace, The Premature Burial, The Masque of Red Death and Wild Angels. The Mystery Science Theater 3000 episode featuring Gunslinger has been released twice: once as part of Rhino Home Video's Mystery Science Theater 3000 Collection, Volume 6, and once by Shout! Factory as a standalone disc.

== In popular culture ==
Gunslinger was featured in a fifth-season episode of the comedy television series Mystery Science Theater 3000 in 1993. It was the penultimate episode for series creator and host Joel Hodgson, who left the show after the next episode, Mitchell.

Actor and writer Kevin Murphy, who provides the voice and puppetry of Tom Servo in the series, spoke disparagingly about the film in the book Mystery Science Theater 3000: The Amazing Colossal Episode Guide: "One of my darkest fears is that I'll one day make my own film, my story, my direction, my own crystalline vision of something so universal, it must needs be shared with the world on the silver screen. And I make the movie, and it turns out like Gunslinger, or any other Corman film—turgid, insipid, clichéd, confusing, every opportunity for artistic expression intentionally ignored."

== Bibliography ==
- Corman, Roger (1998). How I Made a Hundred Movies in Hollywood and Never Lost a Dime. Da Capo Press. ISBN 0306808749.
- Craddock, Jim (2006). VideoHound's Golden Movie Retriever. Gale Group. ISBN 0787689807.
- Del Vecchio, Deborah (2012). Beverly Garland: Her Life and Career. McFarland & Company. ISBN 978-0786465019.
- Hardy, Phil (1983). The Encyclopedia of Western Movies. Octopus. ISBN 0706425553.
- Maltin, Leonard (1995). Leonard Maltin's Movie and Video Guide. Plume.
- Murphy, Kevin (1996). The Mystery Science Theater 3000 Amazing Colossal Episode Guide. Bantam Books. ISBN 0553377833.
- Naha, Ed (1982). The Films of Roger Corman: Brilliance on a Budget. Arco Publishing. ISBN 0668053089.
- Palmer, Randy (2009). Paul Blaisdell, Monster Maker: A Biography of the B Movie Makeup and Special Effects Artist. McFarland & Company. ISBN 978-0786440993.
- Pitts, Michael (2012). Western Movies: A Guide to 5,105 Feature Films. McFarland & Company. ISBN 978-0786463725.
- Verswijver, Leo (2003). "Movies Were Always Magical": Interviews with 19 Actors, Directors, and Producers from the Hollywood of the 1930s Through the 1950s. McFarland & Company. ISBN 0786411295.
- Weaver, Tom (2006). Interviews with B Science Fiction and Horror Movie Makers: Writers, Producers, Directors, Actors, Moguls, and Makeup. McFarland. ISBN 0786428589.
