= Not of This Earth (1957 film) =

1957 film by Roger Corman

- Theatrical release poster
- Directed by: Roger Corman
- Written by: Charles B. Griffith; Mark Hanna
- Produced by: Roger Corman
- Starring: Paul Birch; Beverly Garland; Morgan Jones; William Roerick; Anna Lee Carroll; Jonathan Haze; Dick Miller
- Cinematography: John J. Mescall
- Edited by: Charles Gross
- Music by: Ronald Stein
- Production company: Los Altos Productions
- Distributed by: Allied Artists
- Release date: February 10, 1957
- Running time: 67 minutes (General release); 70 minutes (Television edit)
- Country: United States
- Language: English
- Budget: $100,000 or $85,000
- Box office: $1 million or (double bill) $800,000

Not of This Earth is an independently made 1957 American black-and-white science fiction film produced and directed by Roger Corman (for his Los Altos Productions), that stars Paul Birch, Beverly Garland, Morgan Jones, William Roerick, and Anna Lee Carroll. The film was written by Charles B. Griffith and Mark Hanna and was distributed by Allied Artists Pictures Corporation as a double feature with Attack of the Crab Monsters. Its theatrical release had a running time of 67 minutes, that was expanded to 70 minutes in 1962 for TV syndication.

The storyline concerns the attempts by an extraterrestrial humanoid to surreptitiously secure the blood of humans and to test it on himself as a treatment for a fatal blood disorder which is ravaging the population of his home planet, Davanna.

== Plot ==
A man who is "not of this Earth" has adopted the name "Mr. Johnson" for moving among the populace of Los Angeles. Johnson is from the planet Davanna, where the inhabitants have developed an incurable blood disease as a side effect from a nuclear war. He has been sent to Earth to examine the blood of humans for its possible usefulness in curing Davanna's dying race. Johnson communicates to an authority on Davanna through a device hidden behind a sliding panel in the living room of his Griffith Park mansion. His bodyguard, Jeremy, provides him support and protection, but is unaware of him being a murderous alien. The alien has a sensitivity to high-decibel sounds and is conspicuous for his stilted syntax and his sunglasses, which he wears even in the dark. The sunglasses hide his blank white eyes, which kill his victims by burning into their brain. He removes the blood of his first victim (a teenage girl walking home at night from a date) using a system of tubes and canisters that he keeps in an aluminium attaché case.

Johnson hires nurse Nadine to look after him in his house. Her boss, town physician Dr. Rochelle, is under Johnson's hypnotic control after discovering his patient's peculiar blood cell structure. With a limit on the number of transfusions he can be given, Johnson takes to murdering locals and simply draining their blood. Adding to his victims are a strolling Chinese-American man, a sleazy door-to-door vacuum cleaner salesman and a trio of homeless drunks. The police are mystified by these "vampire killings".

Johnson's plans are disturbed by the unexpected appearance of a female from Davanna. The alien female asks him for an immediate transfusion, because her physical condition is rapidly deteriorating. Johnson breaks into Rochelle's office, but accidentally steals blood contaminated with rabies. The blood proves fatal to the Davanna woman, who collapses in the street and dies at a hospital. Nadine's friend, police patrolman Harry Sherbourne, tries to question Dr. Rochelle about the dead woman, but he is unable to speak while under Johnson's mind control. Now fearing discovery, Johnson sends a bizarre oxygen-activated umbrella-like flying alien creature to kill Rochelle. He also kills Jeremy, who has discovered evidence of Johnson's alien origin. Nadine, whom he attempts to kidnap and take with him, manages to call the police as Johnson chases her through the park in his car. Johnson abandons her and flees, pursued by the arriving Sherbourne on his motorcycle. When Sherbourne turns on his siren, the sound causes Johnson to lose control of his car, and he dies in a crash.

After Johnson's burial, Sherbourne and Nadine stand by his grave, which bears the inscription "Here lies a man who was not of this Earth". While Sherbourne expresses mild compassion for Johnson, for his attempt to rescue his world's dying populace, Nadine refuses to offer any kind of pity. They leave just as a mysterious man approaches the grave site. Like Johnson, he wears the same sunglasses and carries the same distinctive case containing transfusion equipment.

== Cast ==
- Paul Birch as Paul Johnson
- Beverly Garland as Nadine Storey
- Morgan Jones as Harry Sherbourne
- William Roerick as Dr. F.W. Rochelle
- Jonathan Haze as Jeremy Perrin
- Roy Engel as Desk Sergeant
- Dick Miller as Joe Piper, Vacuum Cleaner Salesman
- Anna Lee Carroll as Davanna Woman

== Production ==
Griffith said that after he and Corman had collaborated on the film Gunslinger, he suggested they make a science fiction film and Corman agreed; Not of This Earth was the result. He also said he originally wrote the part of the vacuum cleaner salesman for himself.

Griffth said the film "started all this X-ray eye business. Most of Roger's themes got established right in the beginning. Whatever worked, he'd come and take again, and a lot of things got used over and over. During the production of Not of This Earth, I was married to a nurse, and she helped me do a lot of medical research. I remember how we cured cancer in that script. Somehow the film was a mess when it was finished".

Paul Birch complained bitterly about having to wear the white contact lenses for so many hours during filming. Corman wanted him ready to roll on a moment's notice, so he asked him to leave the contact lenses in his eyes all day long, which caused Birch extreme discomfort. Birch and Corman wound up getting into a shoving match on the set, and Birch walked out on the production before it was finished. Corman used a double (wearing Birch's dark glasses and slouch hat) to finish the few scenes Birch had not completed.

Special effects expert Paul Blaisdell worked on the film in an uncredited capacity.

=== Props and locations ===
Griffith said, "Paul Birch was supposed to wear wraparound glasses, so you couldn't see the sides of his eyes. They stuck gaffer's tape on the sides of his glasses. You can see it if you look. In that film, I was in the scene at the newsstand at Las Palmas".

The exterior of Johnson's house was at 1725 Camino Palermo in Hollywood; it has since been replaced by a block of apartment buildings. The car that Johnson uses is a 1955 Cadillac Fleetwood Series 75 limousine. Dr. Rochelle's office exterior is the now-demolished Hollywood Receiving Hospital, which was located at 1350 North Wilcox Avenue in Hollywood.

== Release ==
Not of This Earth was released in the United States on the bottom half of a double bill with Corman's Attack of the Crab Monsters. Griffith said that the double bill made a 400% profit in its first week. According to Tim Dirks, the film was one of a wave of "cheap teen movies" released for the drive-in market. They consisted of "exploitative, cheap fare created especially for them [teens] in a newly-established teen/drive-in genre".

Some release prints of Not of This Earth run 71 minutes instead of the regular 67 minute running time; these include duplicate scenes that the film's distributor added to the film to lengthen it a bit. For example, a dialogue between Johnson and a representative from Davanna, which appears as a pre-title sequence, is reused again some minutes into the film. This release version has circulated in syndication on U.S. TV stations, 16 mm prints, bootleg videotape, and DVDs.

== Reception ==
Geoff Andrew in his Time Out review said "Low budgets give little reason for regret when the often tacky effects are surrounded by so much imagination, good humour, and sheer joy in film-making as here. Not of This Earth is a minor sci-fi gem, with an alien (Birch; you can tell he's an ET by his briefcase and dark glasses, establishing him as infinitely superior to the moronic middle Americans on view) terrorising Earth (or a small backlot) in his quest for blood for the folks back home".

Michael Weldon in The Psychotronic Encyclopedia of Film called the film, "Corman's most enjoyable science fiction film". The Aurum Film Encyclopedia – Science Fiction said Not of This Earth was "Marvellous".

Lexikon des Science Fiction Films said this about the film: "[…] although not necessarily first rank, [Not of This Earth] still belongs, bearing its low budget in mind, to the best science fiction films of the Fifties".

== Remakes ==
- Not of This Earth (1988), directed by Jim Wynorski and starring Traci Lords.
- Not of This Earth (1995), directed by Terence H. Winkless and starring Michael York.
- Star Portal (1997), directed by Jon Purdy and starring Steven Bauer.

== Home media ==
Not of this Earth was released in the United States as a regular DVD, a part of the Roger Corman's Cult Classics Triple Feature DVD box set, and in the United Kingdom as a single DVD. Foreign DVD releases exist in Spain (as Emisario del otro mundo) and Germany (as Die Außerirdischen).

== See also ==
- List of American films of 1957
- Vampire film
