= War of the Satellites =

1958 film by Roger Corman

- Theatrical release poster
- Directed by: Roger Corman
- Written by: Lawrence Goldman
- Based on: story by Jack Rabin; Irvin Block
- Produced by: Roger Corman
- Starring: Dick Miller; Susan Cabot; Richard Devon
- Music by: Walter Greene
- Production company: Santa Cruz Productions
- Distributed by: Allied Artists
- Release date: May 18, 1958
- Running time: 66 minutes
- Country: United States
- Language: English
- Budget: $70,000 (estimated)

War of the Satellites is a 1958 independently made American black-and-white science fiction drama film produced and directed by Roger Corman and starring Richard Devon, Dick Miller, and Susan Cabot. It was distributed in the U.S. and the U.K. by Allied Artists. In the U.S., it was released on May 18, 1958 as a double feature with Attack of the 50 Foot Woman.

The low-budget feature was rapidly conceived, filmed and released to exploit the international media frenzy around the launch of the Russian Sputnik satellite, the first in space.

In the film, an "unknown force" declares war against Earth when the United Nations disobeys its warnings against assembling and launching the first satellite into space.

== Plot ==
Ten crewed satellites in the United Nations space program's Sigma Project are destroyed after coming into contact with a mysterious space barrier. A small missile-like object later lands on Earth and is turned over to authorities. After examining the capsule, the U.N. calls a meeting and reads aloud a message from the capsule that proclaims to be from the Masters of the Spiral Nebula Ghana, aliens displeased by Earth's repeated attempts to explore space. Calling humans a "disease", the aliens declare that they will set up a quarantine to protect the universe.

The capsule has defied all analysis and its origins remain unknown. One evening, while driving to a U.N. meeting, the head of Sigma, Dr. Van Ponder, is attacked by a mysterious ball of light. It drives him off the road, killing him.

Van Ponder later arrives at the U.N. Unknown to the council, aliens have assumed the form of Van Ponder to infiltrate the project. Van Ponder eventually splits into two separate replicas of the scientist to extend his ability to impede Sigma. Later, various natural disasters occur worldwide. Speculation arises that the disasters may be part of the aliens' warning from outer space.

Astronomer David Boyer eventually notices that Van Ponder has identical markings on each arm. Later, while meeting with astronomical engineer John Campo at the lab, Van Ponder fails to notice that his hand is being burned by a torch. While John races for doctor Howard Lazar, Van Ponder heals the wound. When John arrives with Lazar, Van Ponder's hand is intact.

David investigates Van Ponder's demolished car and realizes that no one could have survived the accident. David later learns that the Sigma launch has been moved forward and is to occur in some hours. Before blast-off, Van Ponder notes that John is part of the crew. While hurrying to his post, David sees Van Ponder replicate himself.

Following the successful launch of the satellite, Van Ponder paralyzes John and reveals that he is an alien. The warning from space came from powerful beings with the ability to transform energy into matter and back again. Van Ponder offers to transform John if he will help him. When John refuses, Van Ponder kills him.

When researcher Sybil Carrington enters the control room and finds them, Van Ponder explains that John did not survive the ship's rapid acceleration process. When David asks Howard about John's death, the doctor asserts that John was completely healthy. After David says that Van Ponder murdered John because he uncovered something Van Ponder was trying to conceal, Howard agrees to examine Van Ponder. Before meeting with Howard, Van Ponder creates a heartbeat for himself, then is startled by his sudden surge of emotion for Sybil. While Sybil meets David to report Van Ponder's unusual behavior, Van Ponder murders Howard, then accuses David of having killed John. David is arrested.

Unaware of Howard's death, Sybil goes in search of Howard and spots Van Ponder. She then takes refuge from him in the solar radiation room. Van Ponder follows her, but when he hears an announcement that David has escaped his guards, Van Ponder replicates himself in front of Sybil. While one replica goes after David, the other attempts to seduce Sybil. As the satellite nears the space barrier, Van Ponder orders the pilots to head toward it. David confronts one of the replicas and wounds him with a gunshot. After a brawl, David kills Van Ponder, after which the replica with Sybil also dies. David orders the satellite to detonate a radiation blast which should catapult them through the barrier. David rescues Sybil from the radiation room just before the blast. David's plan succeeds and the Sigma satellite passes through Andromeda at the speed of light.

== Cast ==
- Dick Miller as Dave Boyer
- Susan Cabot as Sybil Carrington
- Richard Devon as Dr. Pol Van Ponder
- Eric Sinclair as Dr. Howard Lazar
- Michael Fox as Jason ibn Akad
- Robert Shayne as Cole Hotchkiss
- Jered Barclay as John Compo (credited as Jerry Barclay)
- John Brinkley as Crew Member

== Production ==
=== Development ===
Special effects maven Jack Rabin suggested to Roger Corman the idea of making the film, while the topic of space satellites was still hot in the news headlines. In a 2019 interview, Corman recalled his meeting with Steve Broidy of Allied Artists: "I said, 'Steve, if you can give me $80,000, I will have a picture about satellites ready to go into the theaters in 90 days.' And then he said, 'What's the story?' And I said, 'I have no idea, but I will have the picture ready.' And he said, 'Done.' And he gave me the money." Broidy claimed in interviews that when Corman delivered the finished product on time, "he gave him $500.00 to throw a cast party. They're still waiting for the party..."

Susan Cabot's casting was announced in November 1957. She had previously made Sorority Girl, Carnival Rock and The Saga of the Viking Women and Their Voyage to the Waters of the Great Sea Serpent for Corman.

=== Shooting ===
Filming started 9 December 1957.

Daniel Haller was Corman's art director on the film and revealed in an interview how low-budget the spaceship's interior set was, consisting of "four arches to make the hallways in the spaceship...and two lounge chairs. That was the entire ship".

Dick Miller, at 5 feet 5 inches, was a bit intimidated by the six-foot-two Richard Devon. The film's script said Miller was supposed to fight him. At the time, he said he felt that his part should have gone to a more powerful-looking actor, such as "William Lundigan or Richard Carlson". He said, "I looked up at Dick Devon...and said 'Jesus Christ, I gotta beat him up'"? Miller added the part "didn't sit too well. It was a real, quote/unquote, leading-man type, and I was a foot too short for the part."

Miller said filming took place over a "leisurely" 10 days.

We had two of the best lounge chairs money could buy to take off for the moon in. The type where you hit the sides and the chair slides down into a lying-down position. At the time, they looked pretty good, except they really looked like lounge chairs. We had a lot of fun on those. I remember for the hallways on the spaceship...we had four arches, that's all they were, the entire set was arches. You could set them close together to make a short hall or set them further apart and make a long hall. At the end of the hall was a flat—you made a turn. So on our spaceship you always ran down to the end of the hall and made a turn. That was the entire ship.

Susan Cabot remembers being intrigued by the costumes and wished that Corman could have expanded the plot. Richard Devon said the film was one of the few he enjoyed making with Corman, due to the quality of his role.

== Release ==
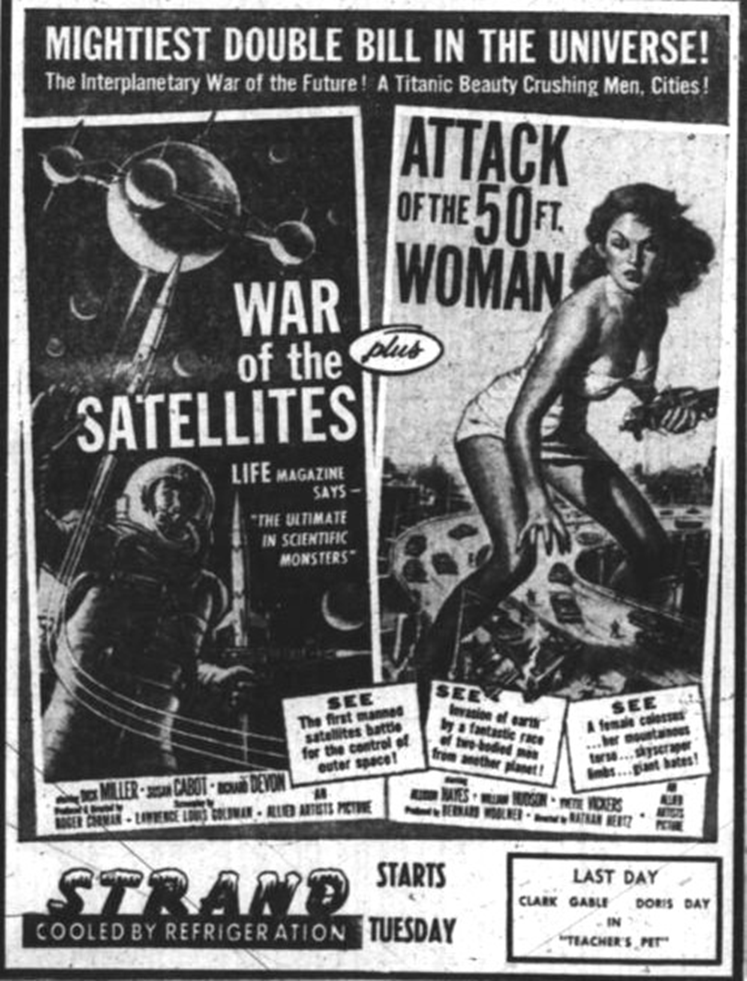
Advertisement from May 18, 1958 for War of the Satellites and co-feature, Attack of the 50 Foot Woman

The film came out on May 18, 1958 on a double bill with Attack of the 50 Foot Woman.

== Reception ==
In their review of the film at AllMovie, critic Bruce Eder wrote that it "is great fun and the plot moves so fast that one barely has time to ask about some of the silliest aspects of what we see," adding that "[o]ne has to laugh at some of the production values, and marvel at others," and that the movie includes "one of the most ambitious scores ever written by Walter Greene." Writing in DVD Talk, film critic Glenn Erickson described the movie as "boil[ing] down to a very small-scale drama played out on a few tiny sets" with "a relatively large number of special effects shots (for a Corman production) that never seem particularly integrated into the story," and that "[t]he movie is held together by the sheer skill of its leading players."
