= Norman Fox =

Norman Fox may refer to:

- Norman Fox (cricketer), Australian cricketer
- Norman A. Fox, American writer of westerns
- Norman Fox & The Rob-Roys, American 1950s doo-wop group from New York
