= Richard Garland =

American actor (1927–1969)

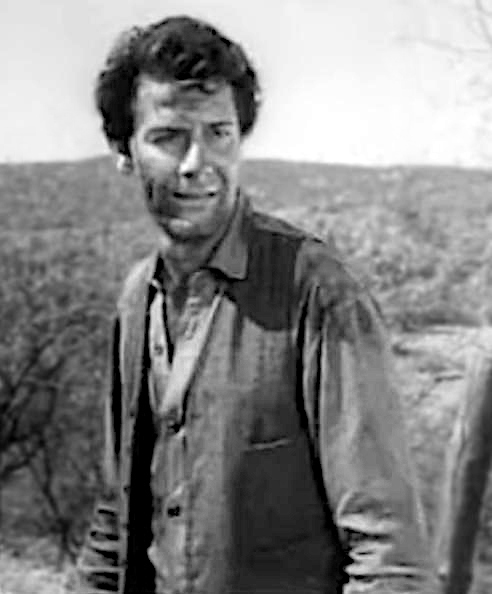
- Garland in 26 Men, 1957
- Born: Charles Richard Garland Jr. July 7, 1927; Mineral Wells, Texas, U.S.
- Died: May 24, 1969 (aged 41); Los Angeles, California, U.S.
- Occupations: Film, stage and television actor
- Years active: 1951–1969
- Spouse: Beverly Garland (m. 1951; div. 1953)

Charles Richard Garland Jr. (July 7, 1927 – May 24, 1969) was an American film, stage and television actor. He was perhaps best known for playing constable Clay Horton in the American children's adventure television series Lassie from 1954 to 1956.

== Life and career ==
Garland was born in Mineral Wells, Texas. He began his career in 1951, first appearing in the stage play Dark of the Moon at the Circle in the Square Theatre.

Garland made his film debut in 1951 in the film Week-End with Father. He then made an appearance in the 1952 film The Cimarron Kid. Garland played Big Jim Moore in the film. In the same year, he appeared in the films The Battle at Apache Pass, Red Ball Express, Scarlet Angel, Untamed Frontier, Son of Ali Baba, and Torpedo Alley.

Later film appearances included Forever Female (1953), The Desperado (1954), The Man from Bitter Ridge (1955), Friendly Persuasion (1956), My Gun Is Quick (1957), 13 Fighting Men (1960), Panic in Year Zero! (1962), and Mutiny in Outer Space (1965). His final credit was from the 1966 film The Chase.

Garland made his television debut in the situation comedy series My Little Margie in 1953. He also made appearances in the western television series The Adventures of Kit Carson.

He guest-starred in television programs including The Deputy, 77 Sunset Strip, The Life and Legend of Wyatt Earp,The Rifleman, Mission: Impossible, 26 Men, Maverick, Daniel Boone, Perry Mason and The Virginian.

== Personal life and death ==
In 1951 Garland married the actress Beverly Garland. They were divorced in 1953.

Garland began to drink heavily in the late 1950s. He died on May 24, 1969 of alcoholism in Los Angeles, California, at the age of 41. His body was used at USC Keck School of Medicine as a laboratory specimen.

== Selected filmography ==
- Wanted Dead or Alive (TV series) (1960) season 2 episode 29 (Death divided by three) : Jake Lorenz
