= Barboura Morris =

American actress (1932–1975)

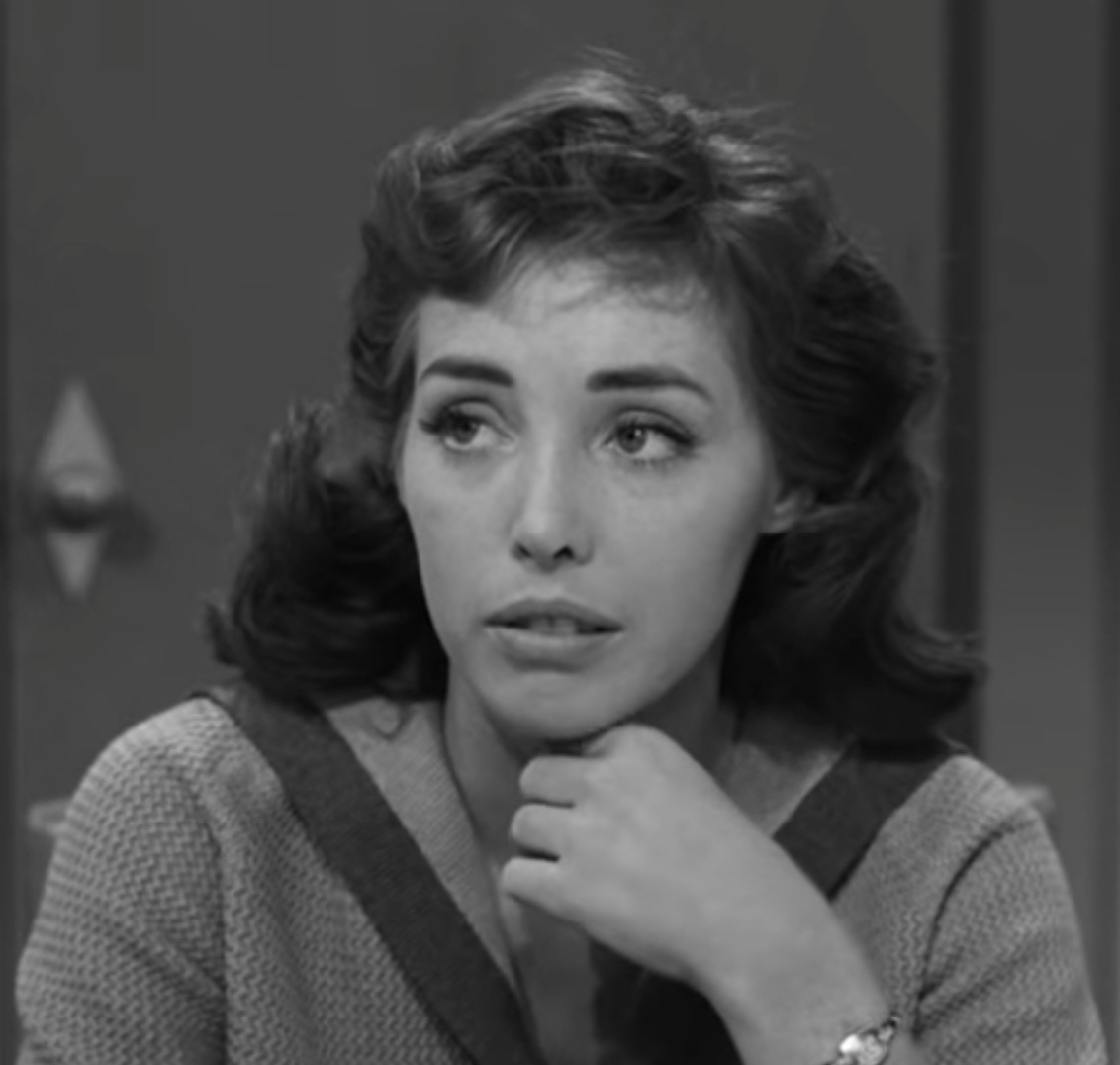
- Morris in The Wasp Woman (1959)
- Born: Barboura O'Neill; October 22, 1932; Los Angeles, California, U.S.
- Died: October 23, 1975 (aged 43); Santa Monica, California, U.S.
- Resting place: Woodlawn Memorial Cemetery
- Education: UCLA
- Occupation: Actress
- Years active: 1956–1970
- Spouse(s): Monte Hellman (m. 1954; div. 1958) Donald Freed (m. 1965; div. 19??)
- Children: 1

Barboura Morris (born Barboura O'Neill; October 22, 1932 – October 23, 1975) was an American actress and writer. She is most remembered for her roles in American International Pictures productions.

== Early years ==
Morris was born Barboura O'Neill in Los Angeles. She graduated from UCLA, where she won the Best Actress awards two times. Shortly after, she joined the Stumptown Players, a 16-person stock theater company in Guerneville which was composed of fellow California university undergraduates and alumni.

== Career ==
=== Acting ===
Fellow Stumptown player Roger Corman gave Morris a leading role in the cult classic Sorority Girl (1957). She appeared in many other low-budget movies for Corman, such as The Wasp Woman and A Bucket of Blood. Morris was often involved in his work with American International Pictures. She starred opposite Charles Bronson in 1958's Machine-Gun Kelly and costarred with Peter Fonda in 1967's The Trip, written by Jack Nicholson.

Morris' final film role was as Anne Sullivan in Helen Keller and Her Teacher, a 1970 dramatization of Keller's life.

Morris' television credits include a 1956 episode of The Man Called X and a 1959 episode of The Thin Man.

=== Writing ===
In 1974, Morris penned an essay titled "Flight 553: the Watergate Murder" that was included in Steve Weissman's Big Brother and the Holding Company: the world behind Watergate. In the piece, Morris implicated Richard Nixon in the death of Dorothy Hunt in the United Airlines Flight 533 plane crash. Historian David Greenberg characterizes Morris' claims as one of the New Left conspiracy theories surrounding Nixon following Watergate.

The essay was planned as part of a full book to be called The Watergate Women, written by Morris and edited by Donald Freed.

== Personal life ==
Morris' first marriage was to Monte Hellman, a producer of experimental theater who led the Stumptown company. The two met when Hellman hired Morris for Stumptown and were married from 1954 to 1958. Following her divorce, she had a brief romantic involvement with Roger Corman during the production of A Bucket of Blood

In 1965, Morris met playwright Donald Freed at the Los Angeles Art Theater. The couple were married that same year and had one son. Morris and Freed collaborated as writers aligned with the New Left movement; Morris published under the name Barboura Morris Freed.

== Death ==
Morris died in 1975 in Santa Monica, aged 43. She had been battling cancer, but died from a stroke. She was buried in Woodlawn Memorial Cemetery.

== Filmography ==
=== Film ===
Year	Title	Role	Notes
1957	Rock All Night	Syl	
1957	Teenage Doll	Janet	
1957	Sorority Girl	Rita Joyce	
1957	The Viking Women and the Sea Serpent		
1958	Machine-Gun Kelly	Lynn Grayson	
1958	Teenage Caveman	Young Tribe Member	Uncredited
1959	A Bucket of Blood	Carla	
1959	The Wasp Woman	Mary Dennison	
1961	Atlas	Candia	
1963	X: The Man with the X-ray Eyes	Nurse with Young Patient	Uncredited
1963	The Haunted Palace	Mrs. Weeden	
1966	The Wild Angels	Mother	Uncredited
1967	The St. Valentine's Day Massacre	Jeanette Landsman	Uncredited
1967	The Trip	Flo	
1969	De Sade	Nun	Uncredited
1970	The Dunwich Horror	Mrs. Cole	
1970	Helen Keller and Her Teacher	Anne Sullivan	Final film role

=== Television ===
Year	Title	Role	Notes
1956	The Man Called X		1 episode
1959	The Thin Man	Amnesiac	1 episode
