= The Battle at Apache Pass =

1952 film by George Sherman

- Film poster by Reynold Brown
- Directed by: George Sherman
- Written by: Gerald Drayson Adams
- Produced by: Leonard Goldstein
- Starring: John Lund; Jeff Chandler; Susan Cabot; Bruce Cowling; Beverly Tyler
- Cinematography: Charles Boyle, A.S.C.
- Edited by: Ted J. Kent, A.C.E.
- Music by: Hans J. Salter
- Production company: Universal-International
- Distributed by: Universal-International
- Release date: May 9, 1952 (New York)
- Running time: 85 minutes
- Country: United States
- Language: English
- Budget: $681,000
- Box office: $2 million (U.S. rentals)

The Battle at Apache Pass is a 1952 American Western film directed by George Sherman and starring John Lund, Jeff Chandler and Susan Cabot.

The film is a highly fictionalized account combining the events of the Bascom affair of 1861 and the Battle of Apache Pass of 1862.

== Plot ==
In 1862 in New Mexico Territory, good relations between Fort Buchanan's commanding officer, Maj. Colton and Chiricahua Apache Indian chief Cochise are threatened by the arrival of government agent Neil Baylor and his dishonest scout Mescal Jack.

In breach of existing treaties, Baylor plans to resettle the Apaches to the San Carlos Reservation, and when Geronimo, the chief of the rival Mogollon Apaches, attacks the Tucson stagecoach and kills women and children, Baylor threatens to also transport the Chiricahuas to San Carlos. When confronted by Colton and Baylor, Cochise calls a council of Apache elders and they vote to banish Geronimo, who must also surrender one of his stagecoach captives, schoolteacher Mary Kearny. After assuring his pregnant wife Nona that his interest in the Mary is not romantic, Cochise brings Mary to Fort Buchanan and entrusts her to Maj. Colton, counseling him that she would be a fine wife.

Baylor and Jack plot with Geronimo to frame Cochise for Geronimo's attack on a ranch. During Colton's inquiry into the attack, his subordinate Lt. Bascom is promised a promotion by Baylor for rescuing the boy who was kidnapped during the attack. Cochise tells Bascom that it was Geronimo who committed the attack, but Bascom accuses him of lying and takes Nona hostage. Three braves are hanged, including Cochise's brother Little Elk. As Cochise mourns and prepares to retaliate against Bascom's position, Mescal Jack approaches him on the pretense of warning of an Army attack, but Cochise calls him a liar and condemns him to death. Colton's trusted Sgt. Reuben Bernard informs him of the situation, causing Colton to close Fort Buchanan and prepare to transfer everyone, including Mary and Baylor, to the more secure Fort Sheridan.

From the hills along the trail, Cochise and Geronimo watch the procession. As shooting begins, the wounded Baylor advances on the Indians' positions, shouting that he is their friend, but Geronimo kills him. Colton and Sgt. Bernard use the expedition's cannon to rout the warriors as Cochise finds Nona, who has been hurt, and takes her to the wagons so that Dr. Carter can treat her. Geronimo calls Cochise a weak leader, but in a one-to-one battle, Cochise wins and, instead of killing Geronimo, banishes him.

Nona's son is born and she gives her friend Mary a precious Apache bracelet. Colton and Mary look at each other with affection and Cochise tells them that time has come for peace as he rides away with Nona.

== Cast ==
- John Lund as Major Jim Colton
- Jeff Chandler as Cochise
- Susan Cabot as Nona
- Bruce Cowling as Neil Baylor
- Beverly Tyler as Mary Kearny
- Richard Egan as Sgt. Reuben Bernard
- Jay Silverheels as Geronimo
- John Hudson as Lt. George Bascom
- Jack Elam as Mescal Jack
- Regis Toomey as Dr. Major Carter
- Tommy Cook as Little Elk
- Hugh O'Brian as Lt. Robert Harley
- James Best as Cpl. Hassett
- Richard Garland as Culver
- Palmer Lee as Joe Bent
- William Reynolds as Lem Bent
- Paul Smith as Trumpeter Cpl. Ross
- Jack Ingram as Johnny Ward

== Production ==
The film was announced in June 1951. Portions were shot in Professor Valley, Ida Gulch, Courthouse Wash, Arches National Park, Colorado River and Sand Flats in Utah.

== Reception ==
In a contemporary review for The New York Times, critic Howard Thompson wrote that the film "heaves a little dignity toward human behavior and motivation" and noted: "Some of the terrible irony of this ancient conflict does manage to filter through all the dust and commotion, but principally when the magnificent Technicolored scenery reduces the participants to mere specks on the horizon."
