= Jered Barclay =

American actor (1930–2022)

- Born: November 22, 1930; Seattle, Washington, U.S.
- Died: July 23, 2022 (aged 91); Los Angeles, California, U.S.
- Education: University of Washington
- Occupation: Actor
- Years active: 1933–1991

Jered Barclay (November 22, 1930 – July 23, 2022) was an American actor, theater director, and acting coach.

== Early life ==
Barclay was born in Seattle, Washington. His great-great-grandfather was a settler who homesteaded on land that eventually became part of the University of Washington campus.

He began his career as a child vaudeville performer, performing beginning at age 3 alongside Judy Garland, Shirley Temple, and Sammy Davis Jr. At age 12, he began touring as a performer with the Clyde Beatty Circus. Barclay attended the University of Washington, where he earned a Bachelor of Arts degree in drama.

== Career ==
He made his feature film debut in the 1957 teen drama Untamed Youth, followed by performances in the Western Gun Fever (1958) and Roger Corman's science fiction film War of the Satellites (also 1958).

In 1962, Barclay relocated from Los Angeles to New York City where he performed in two Off-Broadway productions of Edward Albee plays at the Cherry Lane Theatre: The Zoo Story and The American Dream. The following year, he appeared in Next Time I'll Sing to You at the Phoenix Theatre. He subsequently performed on Broadway in productions of Marat/Sade (1963) and A Patriot for Me (1969).

Barclay later worked as a voice actor for several Hanna Barbera cartoon series beginning in the 1970s, including Foofur, The Little Rascals, Challenge of the GoBots, The Dukes, The Kwicky Koala Show, and The Smurfs. In 1974, he directed a production of Sextet at the Bijou Theatre on Broadway, followed by the Harvey Perr plays Rosebloom and Scandalous Memories.

Beginning the 1980s, Barclay began teaching acting. His students included Rue McClanahan, Dixie Carter, Johnny Depp, Lily Tomlin, Josh Brolin, Patrick Swayze, and Liza Minnelli. Barclay later had supporting roles in the horror film Howling VI: The Freaks (1991) before making his final film appearance in Ken Russell's drama Whore.

== Filmography ==
=== Film ===
Year	Title	Role	Notes	Ref.
1957	Untamed Youth	Ralph	As Jerry Barclay	
1957	Bop Girl Goes Calypso	Jerry	As Jerry Barclay	
1957	Valerie	Mingo	As Jerry Barclay	
1957	Young and Dangerous	Stretch Grass	As Jerry Barclay	
1958	Gun Fever	Singer	As Jerry Barclay	
1958	War of the Satellites	John Compo	As Jerry Barclay	
1958	The Naked and the Dead	Corporal	Uncredited	
1959	Gunmen from Laredo	Jordan Kiefer	As Jerry Barclay	
1961	The Children's Hour	Grocery boy		
1985	Tuff Turf	Reynolds		
1991	The Perfect Bride	Reverend Wells	Television film	
1991	Howling VI: The Freaks	Dewey		
1991	Whore	Dead Trick in Car	Final screen role	

== Select stage credits ==
Year	Title	Role	Location	Notes	Ref.
1961	Krapp's Last Tape		Stage Society Theatre, Los Angeles		
1962	The Zoo Story and The American Dream	Jerry / The Young Man	Cherry Lane Theatre		
1962	Next Time I'll Sing to You	Meff	Phoenix Theatre		
1963	Marat/Sade	Deuperret	Majestic Theatre		
1964	The Zoo Story	Jerry	Cherry Lane Theatre		
1969	A Patriot for Me	Ludwig Max von Kupfer	Imperial Theatre		
1969	Tonight in Living Color	—N/a	Actors' Playhouse	Director	
1972	Rosebloom	—N/a	Eastside Playhouse	Director	
1974	Sextet	—N/a	Bijou Theatre	Director and choreographer	
