= 13 Fighting Men =

1960 American film by Harry W. Gerstad

- Theatrical release poster
- Directed by: Harry W. Gerstad
- Screenplay by: Robert Hamner; Jack W. Thomas
- Produced by: Jack Leewood
- Starring: Grant Williams; Brad Dexter; Carole Mathews; Robert Dix; Richard Garland; Richard Crane
- Cinematography: Walter Strenge
- Edited by: Harry W. Gerstad and John Bushelman
- Music by: Irving Gertz
- Production company: Associated Producers Inc
- Distributed by: 20th Century-Fox
- Release date: April 1960
- Running time: 69 minutes
- Country: United States
- Language: English

13 Fighting Men is a 1960 American drama film directed by Harry W. Gerstad and written by Robert Hamner and Jack W. Thomas. The film stars Grant Williams, Brad Dexter, Carole Mathews, Robert Dix, Richard Garland and Richard Crane.

The film was released in April 1960 by 20th Century-Fox.

== Plot ==
Though the American Civil War has officially ended, a group of Confederate soldiers continues to fight for their own cause, laying siege to a small group of Union soldiers holed up in a farmhouse who are guarding a substantial amount of gold coins for a federal agent. The story comes off okay in this noticeably low-budget effort thanks to all the personalities this film features. The presence of all that gold seems to affect all of them in interesting ways. The farm owner is a Union army vet who converted to pacifism after experiencing the war, while his wife is trying to attract the Union commander who is trying to protect the gold from both his men and the Confederates, who include some strange characters, one of which is Ted Knight.

== Cast ==
- Grant Williams as Capt. John Forrest
- Brad Dexter as Maj. Simon Boyd
- Carole Mathews as Carole Prescott
- Robert Dix as Lt. Wilcox
- Richard Garland as Capt. John Prescott
- Richard Crane as Loomis
- Rayford Barnes as Sgt. Yates
- Rex Holman as Root
- John Erwin as Cpl. McLean
- Boyd Holister as Pvt. Jensen
- Mauritz Hugo as Walter Ives
- Richard Monahan as Pvt. Pike
- Ted Knight as Samuel
- Fred Kohler Jr. as Corey
- Stephen Ferry as Sgt. Wade
- I. Stanford Jolley as Pvt. Ebb
- Walter Reed as Col. Jeffers
- John Frederick as Lee
- Mark Hickman as Sgt. Mason
- Ford Dunhill as Pvt. Harper
- Brad Harris as Pvt. Fowler
- Earl Holmes as Confederate Soldier
- Richard Jeffries as Jimmy
- Jerry Mobley as Sentry

== Production ==
The film was announced in September 1959. Filming started in December.

== Reception ==
The New York Daily News awarded 13 Fighting Men two and a half stars, calling it "... a cut above the average Civil War story ... There is suspense and melodrama. ... Performances are surprisingly good."
