= David J. Stewart =

American actor (1915–1966)

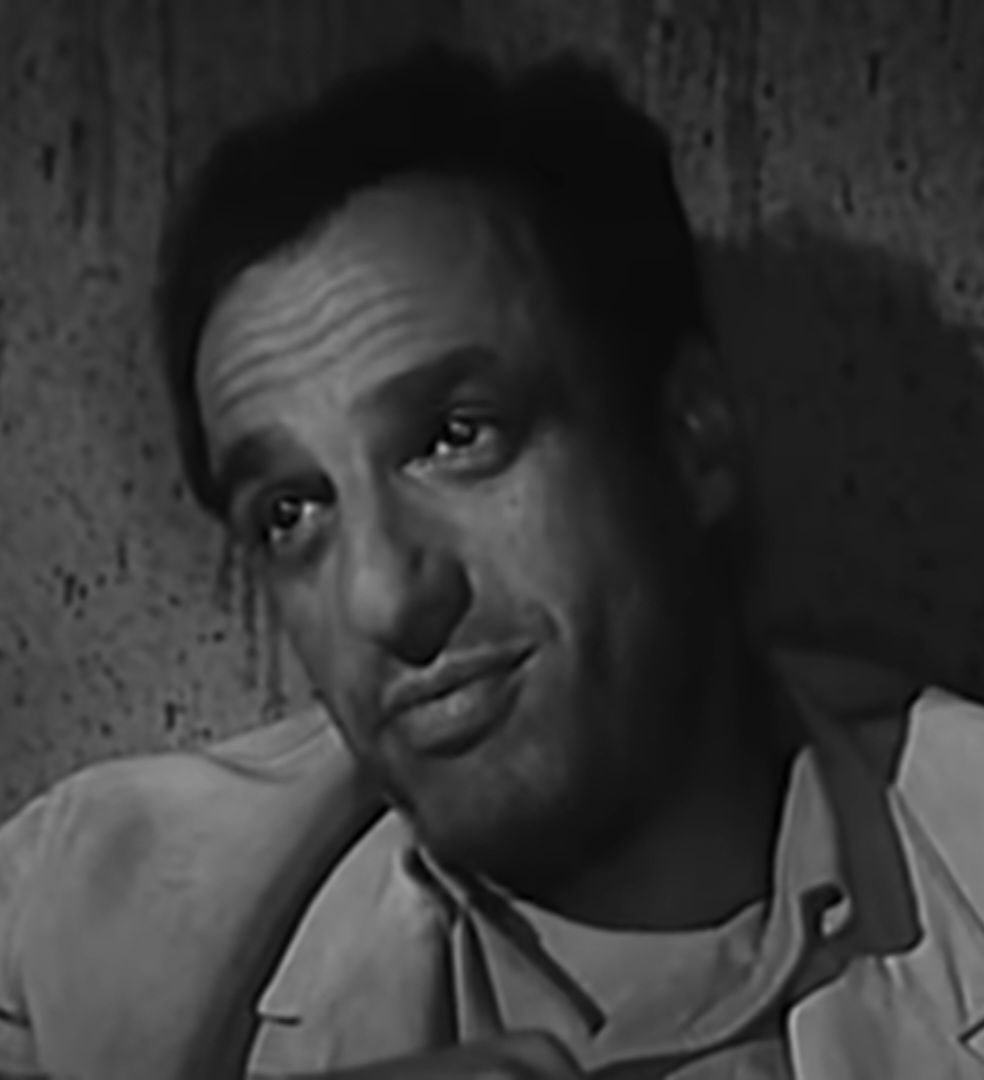
- Stewart in an episode of One Step Beyond (1960)
- Born: January 8, 1915; Omaha, Nebraska, U.S.
- Died: December 23, 1966 (aged 51); Cleveland, Ohio, U.S.
- Occupation: Actor
- Years active: 1949–1967
- Spouse: Helene
- Children: 2

David J. Stewart (January 8, 1915 – December 23, 1966) was an American Broadway, film, and television actor.

Born Abe J. Siegel in Omaha, Nebraska, Stewart was known primarily as a New York stage actor. He also made several appearances in movies and on television before his death at age 51 in Cleveland, Ohio following surgery.

== Early life ==
Stewart was born in Omaha and attended the University of Omaha. He moved to New York and trained as an actor at the Neighborhood Playhouse School of the Theater and the Actors Studio, where he became a lifetime member. During World War II, he served as a paratrooper in the 82nd Airborne, receiving a Purple Heart and a Bronze Star.

== Film and TV career ==
Stewart's played Louis "Lepke" Buchalter, the real-life crime boss whose activities were central to the film Murder, Inc. (1960). He also co-starred in the rockabilly-themed film Carnival Rock (1957), for which director Roger Corman, hoping to give the film some gravitas, recruited him from New York, a point noted by actor Ed Nelson in an interview with film historian Tom Weaver.

Stewart's strong, aquiline features were well-suited to the stage but limited his on-screen roles to character parts. According to Nelson, Stewart looked at him on the set one day and said "My God, what I couldn't do with a face like that."

His other film roles were small, and while he appeared often on live television in the 1950s, his only TV roles that remain accessible were on Have Gun Will Travel, One Step Beyond, Alfred Hitchcock Presents, Voyage to the Bottom of the Sea, The Man From U.N.C.L.E., The Untouchables, and Naked City.

The Hitchcock episode "The Sorcerer's Apprentice" concerns a magician (played by Stewart) whose act includes sawing his wife in half. The episode was deemed too gruesome by the NBC television Network and sponsor Revlon, which cancelled the network broadcast. The episode was syndicated to local stations. An infamous footnote in the series' history, the episode fell into public domain, and it often is included in value-priced Hitchcock DVD collections.

== Broadway career ==
Stewart's Broadway career was illustrious; in a cast composed primarily of his fellow Actors Studio members, and directed by Studio co-founder Elia Kazan, Stewart played Proust's Baron de Charlus in the original 1953 production of Tennessee Williams' Camino Real. Although the play was a notorious flop, Stewart won the Clarence Derwent Award for most-promising male performer from the Actors' Equity Foundation. He also appeared in the 1962 Broadway premiere of A Man For All Seasons and the original 1964 productions of Arthur Miller's After the Fall and Incident at Vichy.

== Death ==
Stewart died after an operation in Cleveland, Ohio on December 23, 1966. He was survived by his wife Helene, son Jean-Pierre, daughter Judy, and four sisters. His funeral was held on December 26 in Omaha.

== Filmography ==
Year	Title	Role	Notes
1954	The Silver Chalice	Adam	
1957	Carnival Rock	Christopher 'Christy' Cristakos	
1960	Murder, Inc.	Louis 'Lepke' Buchalter	
1961	The Young Savages	Barton	
1962	Alfred Hitchcock Presents	Sadini	season 7, episode 39: "The Sorcerer's Apprentice"
1967	Who's Minding the Mint?	Samson Link	
