= Fort Massacre =

1958 film by Joseph M. Newman

- Directed by: Joseph M. Newman
- Written by: Martin Goldsmith
- Produced by: Walter Mirisch
- Starring: Joel McCrea; Forrest Tucker; John Russell; Susan Cabot
- Cinematography: Carl E. Guthrie
- Edited by: Richard Heermance
- Music by: Marlin Skiles
- Production company: The Mirisch Company
- Distributed by: United Artists Corporation
- Release date: May 1, 1958
- Running time: 80 minutes
- Country: United States
- Language: English

Fort Massacre is a 1958 American Western film, directed by Joseph M. Newman, starring: Joel McCrea, Forrest Tucker, John Russell and Susan Cabot. A possibly mad cavalry commander leads his troops through dangerous Indian territory.

== Plot ==
An embittered cavalry sergeant must take over his regiment after their commanding officer is killed during an ambush. Vinson is driven by his hatred of Apaches, who were responsible for the death of his wife and children. He and his remaining men, including Travis and McGurney, try to ride 100 miles (161 km) to the safety of Fort Crane, a fictional analogue of Fort Craig in New Mexico Territory. Along the way they attack an Indian band, despite being heavily outnumbered. Vinson's vengeance knows no bounds, until Travis is ultimately forced to take a stand and confront him.

== Cast ==
- Joel McCrea as Sgt. Vinson
- Forrest Tucker as Pvt. McGurney
- Susan Cabot as Piute Girl
- John Russell as Pvt. Robert W. Travis
- George N. Neise as Pvt. Pendleton
- Anthony Caruso as Pawnee (Indian scout)
- Robert Osterloh as Pvt. Schwabacker
- Denver Pyle as Pvt. Collins
- Francis McDonald as Old Piute Man (as Francis J. McDonald)
- Guy Prescott as Pvt. Tucker
- Rayford Barnes as Pvt. Moss
- Irving Bacon as Charlie the Trader
- Claire Carleton as Adele (Charlie's wife)
- Larry Chance as Moving Cloud

== Reception ==
Reviewing the film in 2023, Mark Franklin writes:

A well-done, though mostly downbeat, cavalry vs. Indians film. Vinson's a complicated man. He can explain his decisions with military rationale, but he guns down one Apache who's trying to surrender and sparks a final skirmish when there's a chance to avoid gunfire...

The climax comes when Vinson decides his small command will take refuge in a cliff dwelling to give a badly wounded trooper time to rest. 'Okay, we'll build our own fort,' another disgruntled trooper says. "Fort Massacre." They find an old Indian and his daughter living there. Eventually, the Apache war band shows up as well.
