= Gunsmoke (film) =

1953 film starring Audie Murphy directed by Nathan H. Juran

- Film poster by Reynold Brown
- Directed by: Nathan Juran
- Written by: D. D. Beauchamp
- Based on: Roughshod; 1951 novel by Norman A. Fox
- Produced by: Aaron Rosenberg
- Starring: Audie Murphy; Susan Cabot; Paul Kelly
- Cinematography: Charles P. Boyle
- Edited by: Ted J. Kent
- Color process: Technicolor
- Production company: Universal International Pictures
- Distributed by: Universal Pictures
- Release date: May 4, 1953
- Running time: 79 minutes
- Country: United States
- Language: English
- Box office: $1.3 million (U.S. rentals)

Gunsmoke is a 1953 American Western film directed by Nathan Juran and starring Audie Murphy, Susan Cabot, and Paul Kelly. The film has no connection to the contemporary radio and later TV series of the same name. The film was based on the 1951 novel Roughshod by Norman A. Fox.

== Plot ==
Murphy stars as Reb Kittridge, a wandering hired gun who is hired to get the deeds of the last remaining ranch not owned by local boss Matt Telford. That last ranch is owned by Dan Saxon. Though Reb has not yet accepted the job he is ambushed by Saxon's ramrod, ranch foreman Curly Mather, who kills his horse. Once in town, he is challenged to a gun fight by Saxon, but shoots Saxon in his gun hand instead of with a killing shot.

Saxon, a former wild outlaw who has settled down, senses Reb has good in him and when he hears Reb's goal in life is to own his own ranch he loses the deed of the ranch to Reb in a card draw. It is obvious he does this on purpose since he earlier won a similar contest by outdrawing his opponent's king.

Reb takes over the ranch and moving its cattle herd to a railhead for sale to the workers. Telford hires Reb's fellow gunslinger and sometime friend, Johnny Lake to stop the herd and Reb. Reb has also fallen in love with Rita, the rancher's daughter, who currently is in love with Mather.

== Cast ==
- Audie Murphy as Reb Kittridge
- Susan Cabot as Rita Saxon
- Paul Kelly as Dan Saxon
- Charles Drake as Johnny Lake
- Mary Castle as Cora Dufrayne
- Jack Kelly as Curly Mather
- Jesse White as Professor
- Donald Randolph as Matt Telford
- William Reynolds as Brazos
- Chubby Johnson as Doc Farrell

== Production ==
The movie started filming in June 1952 under the title of Roughshod. It was the first of three Westerns Murphy made with Nathan Juran over two years. Filming took place in Big Bear Lake, California.
