= Susan Cabot =

American actress (1927–1986)

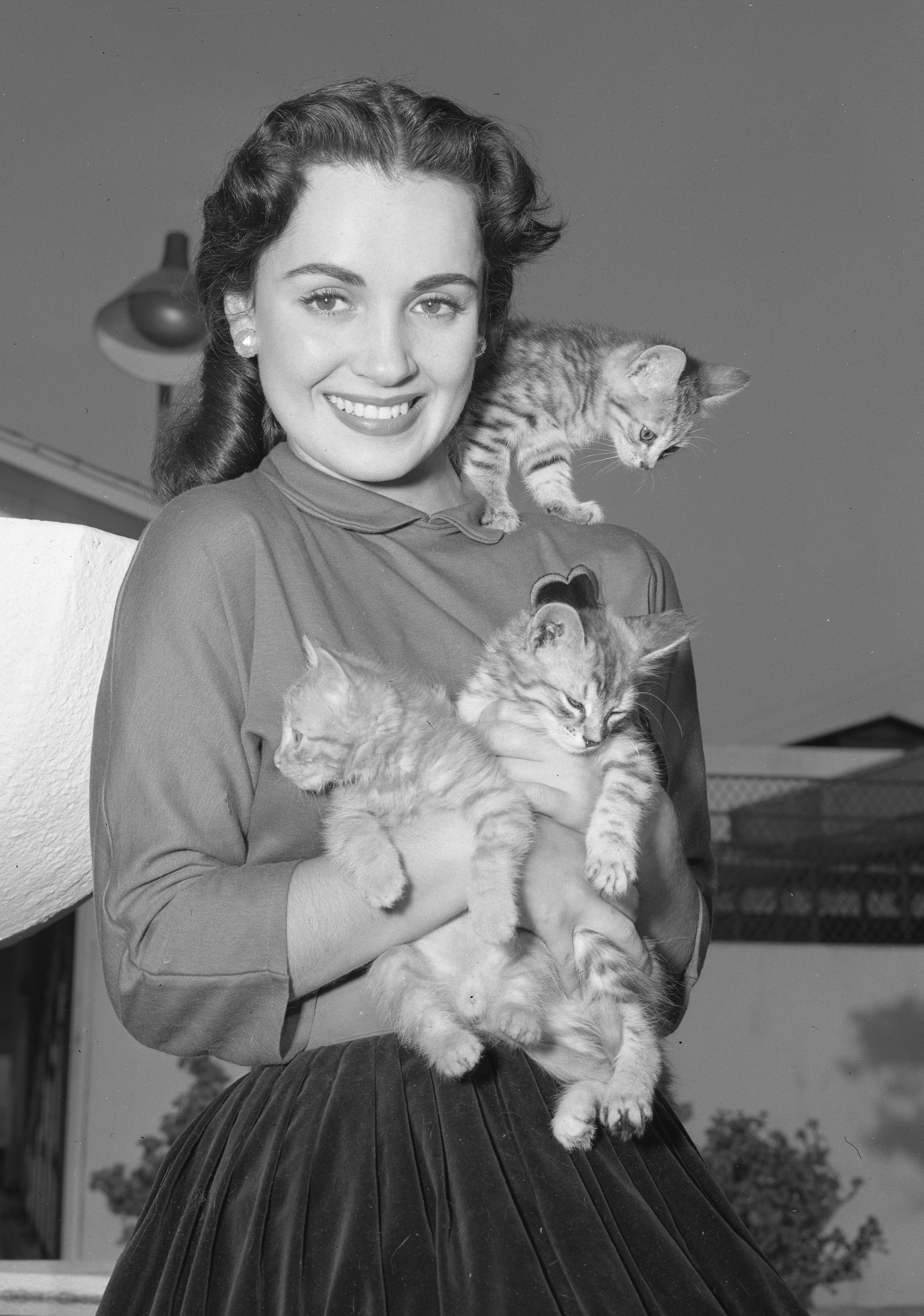
- Cabot, c. 1950
- Born: Harriet Pearl Shapiro; July 9, 1927; Boston, Massachusetts, U.S.
- Died: December 10, 1986 (aged 59); Los Angeles, California, U.S.
- Cause of death: Involuntary manslaughter (blunt force trauma)
- Occupation: Actress
- Years active: 1947–1970
- Spouses: Martin Sacker (m. 1944; div. 1951) Michael Roman (m. 1968; div. 1983)
- Children: 1

Susan Cabot (born Harriet Pearl Shapiro; July 9, 1927 – December 10, 1986) was an American film, stage and television actress. She rose to prominence for her roles in a variety of Western films, including Tomahawk (1951), The Duel at Silver Creek (1952) and Gunsmoke (1953).

After severing her contract with Universal Pictures in the mid-1950s, Cabot returned to performing in theater in New York. She subsequently returned to Hollywood in the later part of the decade and appeared in a series of films by director Roger Corman, such as Sorority Girl (1957), War of the Satellites and Machine-Gun Kelly (both 1958). She made her final film appearance in Corman's horror feature, The Wasp Woman (1959).

Cabot spent the following two decades largely in seclusion, though she did appear in off-Broadway theatre in the early 1960s and made a 1970 television appearance on the series Bracken's World. By the 1980s, Cabot was suffering from severe mental illness, including depression, suicidal thoughts and irrational phobias.

On December 10, 1986, Cabot's only child, 22-year-old Timothy Roman, bludgeoned her to death in their Los Angeles home with a weightlifting bar after Cabot reportedly awoke in a panicked state and attacked him. Roman, who had dwarfism and suffered pituitary gland problems, pleaded guilty to involuntary manslaughter and was sentenced to three years' probation for his matricide.

== Biography ==
=== 1927–1946: Early life ===
Cabot was born Harriet Pearl Shapiro on July 9, 1927, to a Jewish family in Boston, Massachusetts. She led an early life filled with turmoil; after her father abandoned their family, Cabot's mother Elizabeth was institutionalized, leaving Cabot orphaned. She was subsequently raised in eight different foster homes, spending the majority of her early life in the New York City borough of the Bronx. It was posthumously revealed that, while in foster care, Cabot suffered emotional and sexual abuse, which triggered intense post-traumatic stress disorder.

Cabot attended high school in Manhattan, and found employment as an illustrator of children's books. She supplemented her income by working as a singer, performing at the Village Barn club in Manhattan. She married her first husband, the artist Martin Sacker, on July 30, 1944, in Washington, DC, while still a minor. Sacker was a childhood friend, and the marriage presented Cabot with an opportunity to leave foster care.

=== 1947–1959: Acting career ===
Cabot made her film debut in Twentieth Century Fox's film noir Kiss of Death (1947), which was filmed in New York, playing a bit part as a restaurant patron. She was subsequently spotted performing at the Village Barn by a talent scout for Columbia Pictures, who cast her in On the Isle of Samoa (1950). This role led to further Hollywood roles, with Cabot signing a contract with Universal Pictures. Her first film with the studio was the 1951 Western Tomahawk. The same year, Cabot divorced her husband, Sacker, and was subsequently romantically linked with King Hussein of Jordan for several years.

Based on her performances in the On the Isle of Samoa and Tomahawk, Cabot appeared as a lead in a series of roles in similar Western and Arabian-themed films, such as The Battle at Apache Pass and The Duel at Silver Creek, and Son of Ali Baba (all 1952). In 1953, she starred in a further two Westerns: Gunsmoke and Ride Clear of Diablo.

Dissatisfied with her film offers, Cabot asked to be released from her contract in 1954. She returned to New York, and resumed her stage career with a role in a Leonard Kantor–directed, Washington DC–based production of Harold Robbins' A Stone for Danny Fisher. Cabot studied acting with Sanford Meisner in New York, and continued to pursue a stage career, appearing in a short-lived run of the musical Shangri-La in Boston in 1959.

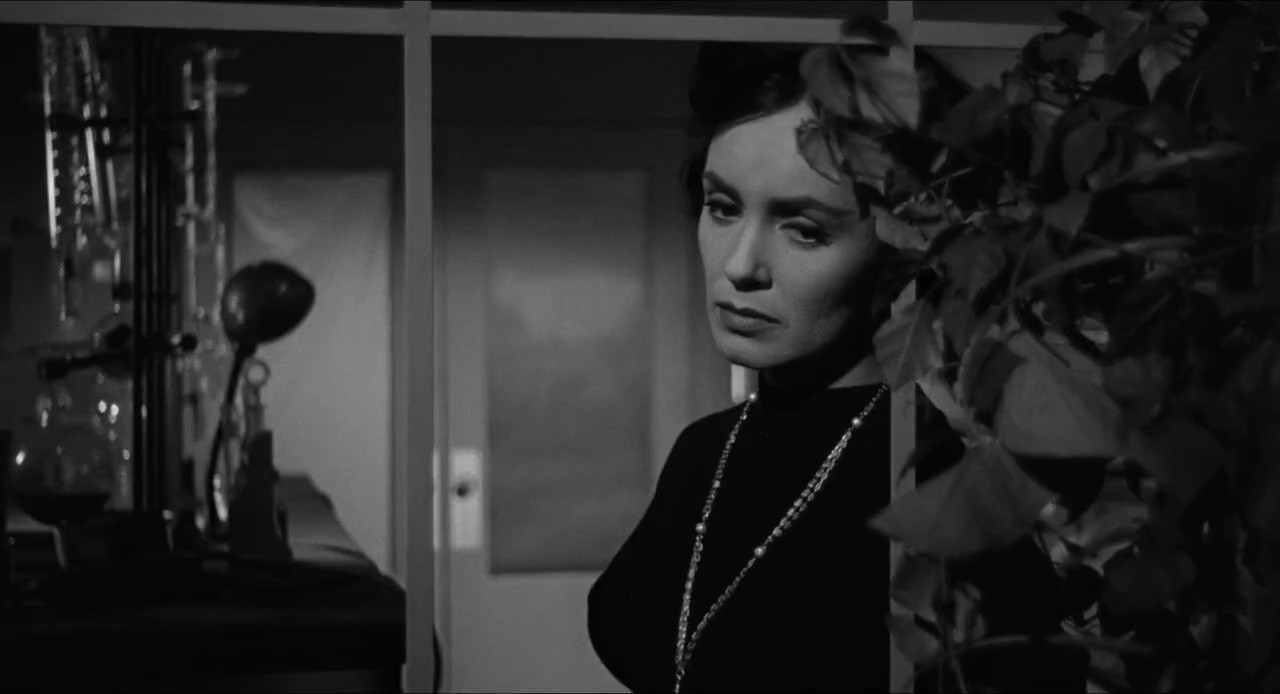
Cabot in her final film role, The Wasp Woman (1959)

Cabot returned to Los Angeles and resumed a film career in the latter part of the 1950s, appearing in a series of films for Roger Corman: Carnival Rock, Sorority Girl, The Viking Women and the Sea Serpent (all 1957), War of the Satellites, and Machine-Gun Kelly (both 1958). The same year, she had a lead role in the Western Fort Massacre, opposite Joel McCrea. Cabot's final film role was in Corman's horror film The Wasp Woman (1959). Speaking on her work with Corman, Cabot recalled it as "Totally mad. It was like a European movie," though she stated that Corman was "some kind of maverick... he's very bright and fast-thinking."

=== 1960–1986: Seclusion and later life ===
A declassified government memo in 2018 revealed that Cabot was invited by the CIA to a party with King Hussein of Jordan, who was in Los Angeles on a trip and desired female company. While she did not necessarily wish to accomplish the CIA goal of "go to bed with him", she went to the party and evidently found him charming. Cabot soon had a seven-year affair with King Hussein of Jordan (which the CIA was aware of) and their only child, Timothy Scott, was born out of wedlock in 1964. She received $1500 in monthly support from Hussein. In 1968, she married her second husband Michael Roman with whom she raised Timothy, before again divorcing in 1983.

In the last years of her life, Cabot suffered from depression and suicidal thoughts, and was prey to a wide range of irrational, powerful fears. She was under a licensed psychologist's care, but the psychologist found her so troubled and ill that the sessions became "emotionally draining." Cabot became increasingly unable to care for herself; the interior of her home was littered with spoiled food and old newspapers. In late 1986, Cabot's mental health deteriorated significantly. Despite the squalor of the home's interior, Cabot still maintained an "adequate" income despite having retired from acting, largely due to real estate investments and her fascination with vintage cars, which she regularly acquired, restored, and resold.

== Death ==
On December 10, 1986, Cabot's 22-year-old son, Timothy Scott Roman, bludgeoned her to death in her home in the Encino neighborhood of Los Angeles, with a weightlifting bar. He was charged with second-degree murder.

At trial, Roman testified that his mother had awakened him while screaming, not recognizing him, and calling for her mother, Elizabeth. When he attempted to call emergency services, she attacked him with a barbell bar and a scalpel. Roman seized the bar from her and beat her repeatedly on the head.

He then hid the bar and scalpel, and told police that a man in a ninja mask had killed his mother (believing no one would believe his story about her mental illness). Roman's defense attorneys claimed their client's aggressive reaction to his mother's attack was due to the drugs he took to counteract his dwarfism and pituitary gland problems because the drugs were linked to Creutzfeldt–Jakob disease (CJD) prion contamination.

At the close of the trial, prosecutors changed the charge to involuntary manslaughter, as no evidence had been presented at trial to support premeditation (which was required for a murder conviction). Superior Court Judge Darlene E. Schempp deliberated 10 minutes, and then convicted Roman of involuntary manslaughter. Roman, who had already spent 2 1/2 years in jail, was sentenced to three years' probation on November 28, 1989, and ordered to seek psychiatric counseling. He was given credit for the time he had already served in jail awaiting trial.

== Filmography ==
=== Film ===
Year	Title	Role	Notes	Ref.
1947	Kiss of Death	Restaurant extra	Uncredited	
1950	On the Isle of Samoa	Moana		
1951	The Enforcer	Nina Lombardo	Uncredited; Alternative title: Murder, Inc.	
1951	Tomahawk	Monahseetah	Alternative title: Battle of Powder River	
1951	The Prince Who Was a Thief	Girl	Uncredited	
1951	Flame of Araby	Clio	Alternative title: Flame of the Desert	
1952	The Battle at Apache Pass	Nona		
1952	The Duel at Silver Creek	Jane "Dusty" Fargo	Alternative title: Claim Jumpers	
1952	Son of Ali Baba	Tala		
1953	Gunsmoke	Rita Saxon	Alternative titles: A Man's Country; Roughshod	
1954	Ride Clear of Diablo	Laurie Kenyon		
1957	Carnival Rock	Natalie Cook		
1957	Sorority Girl	Sabra Tanner	Alternate titles: The Bad One; Sorority House	
1957	The Viking Women and the Sea Serpent	Enger	Alternative titles: Undersea Monster; Viking Women	
1958	War of the Satellites	Sybil Carrington		
1958	Machine Gun Kelly	Florence "Flo" Becker		
1958	Fort Massacre	Piute Girl		
1959	Surrender - Hell!	Delia Guerrero	Alternative titles: Blackburn's Guerrillas; Blackburn's Headhunters	
1959	The Wasp Woman	Janice Starlin	Alternative titles: The Bee Girl; Insect Woman	

=== Television ===
Year	Title	Role	Notes
1958	Have Gun - Will Travel	Angela	Episode "The High Graders"
1959	Have Gun - Will Travel	Becky Carver	Episode "Comanche"
1970	Bracken's World	Henrietta	Episode: "One, Two, Three... Cry"

== Stage credits ==
Year	Title	Role	Notes	Ref.
1954	A Stone for Danny Fisher		National Theatre, Washington, D.C.	
1955	Much Ado About Nothing		Brattle Theatre	
1955	The Two Gentlemen of Verona		Neighborhood Playhouse	
1956	Shangri-La	Lo-Tsen	Shubert Theatre, Boston	
1956	The Champagne Complex		Myrtle Beach Playhouse, Myrtle Beach, South Carolina	
1956	Knickerbocker Holiday		Long Beach Playhouse, Long Island; Triple Cities Theatre, Binghamton	
1962	Intimate Relations	Madeleine	Mermaid Theatre	

== Sources ==
- Wagner, Laura (2020). Hollywood's Hard-Luck Ladies: 23 Actresses Who Suffered Early Deaths, Accidents, Missteps, Illnesses and Tragedies. Jefferson, North Carolina: McFarland. ISBN 978-1-476-67843-6.
- Weaver, Tom (2000). Return of the B Science Fiction and Horror Heroes: The Mutant Melding of Two Volumes of Classic Interviews. Jefferson, North Carolina: McFarland. ISBN 978-0-786-40755-2.
