= Rayford Barnes =

American film and television actor (1920–2000)

- Barnes, c. 1983
- Born: October 23, 1920; Dallas, Texas, U.S.
- Died: November 11, 2000 (aged 80); Santa Monica, California, U.S.
- Resting place: California, U.S.
- Years active: 1952–1997
- Spouses: Bette Powelson (1950–1954); Debra Barnes (m. 1973)
- Relatives: Binnie Barnes (aunt)

Rayford Barnes (October 23, 1920 – November 11, 2000) was an American film and TV character actor from Whitesboro, Texas.

== Early years ==
Barnes was born in Dallas, Texas, and attended the University of Texas, majoring in journalism. He acted in plays at the university and at little theaters in Dallas and San Antonio. After he moved to Oakland, California, he performed at the Pasadena Community Playhouse.

He had a younger brother, Lou Dupont, who was also an entertainer.

During World War II, Barnes served 4 1/2 years in the Navy, working as a navigator.

== Career ==
Barnes worked as a disc jockey at radio stations KTSA and WOAI.

After his military service, Barnes was a stagehand at three theaters in the San Francisco area, and he developed "a healthy respect for all the items actors depend upon for support ..."

In 1950, Barnes gained membership in Actors Equity and began to act on stage in Repertory Theater productions, including Three's a Family and Hasty Heart. He also worked off-stage there, creating staging and scenes for two other plays.

Barnes appeared in films, mainly westerns, such as Hondo, The Burning Hills, Fort Massacre, The Wild Bunch, The Hunting Party, and Cahill U.S. Marshal. He also appeared in the 1955 comedy Bowery to Bagdad.

Barnes also appeared on dozens of TV series most notably The Life and Legend of Wyatt Earp in which he portrayed Ike Clanton. Other series he appeared on include Father Knows Best, Bat Masterson, Highway Patrol, Racket Squad, The Untouchables, Cheyenne, Maverick, Have Gun - Will Travel, Cannon (episode "Call Unicorn), Touched by an Angel, episode Millennium with Ann-Magret, The Twilight Zone (episode "A Quality of Mercy", with Albert Salmi and Ralph Votrian), The Big Valley, Daniel Boone, The High Chaparral, Bonanza, Gunsmoke, Rawhide, Wonder Woman, Little House on the Prairie, Fantasy Island, The Dukes of Hazzard, and Walker, Texas Ranger. His final role was on the NBC medical drama ER in 1996.

== Personal life ==
In 1950, Barnes married Betty, and the next year they had a son.

Barnes lived in Manhattan Beach, California, with his long-time companion, Debbie. He often spoke about his movie making experiences with John Wayne, for whom he had great admiration.

== Death ==
Barnes died in Santa Monica or Manhattan Beach, California, on November 11, 2000, at age 80.

== Selected filmography ==
- Thunderbirds (1952) – Sergeant Case (uncredited)
- The Stranger Wore a Gun (1953) – Raider Todd / Townsman (uncredited)
- Hondo (1953) – Pete – Card Player in Saloon
- Red River Shore (1953) – Pete – Henchman (uncredited)
- The Desperado (1954) – Ray Novak
- Return from the Sea (1954) – Radioman (uncredited)
- Drum Beat (1954) – Captain Summer (uncredited)
- Bowery to Bagdad (1955) – Canarsie
- Battle Cry (1955) – Marine Aide on Command Ship Off Saipan (uncredited)
- Seven Angry Men (1955) – William Doyle (uncredited)
- Wichita (1955) – Hal Clements (uncredited)
- The Revolt of Mamie Stover (1956) – Soldier (uncredited)
- Behind the High Wall (1956) – George Miller
- The Burning Hills (1956) – Veach
- The Young Guns (1956) – Kid Cutler
- Stagecoach to Fury (1956) – Zick
- Beginning of the End (1957) – Chuck – National Guard Corporal
- Gun Glory (1957) – Blondie (uncredited)
- The Invisible Boy (1957) – Captain McLaren (uncredited)
- Fort Massacre (1958) – Moss
- The Man Who Died Twice (1958) – Police Technician (uncredited)
- Ride a Crooked Trail (1958) – Teeler Gang Member (uncredited)
- Tombstone Territory (1958) – Laredo Markham
- Lone Texan (1959) – Finch
- The Gunfight at Dodge City (1959) – Corporal (uncredited)
- Never So Few (1959) – Soldier in Helicopter (uncredited)
- 13 Fighting Men (1960) – Sergeant Yates
- Bells Are Ringing (1960) – Bookie (uncredited)
- Young Jesse James (1960) – Pitts
- North to Alaska (1960) – Gold Buyer (uncredited)
- Cimarron (1960) – Cavalry Sergeant Who Breaks Up Fight (uncredited)
- Bat Masterson (1961) – Ed Twister
- The Three Stooges in Orbit (1962) – Zogg / Airline Co-Pilot
- Gunsmoke (1962) – Lee
- The Alfred Hitchcock Hour (1963) (Season 1 Episode 26: "An Out for Oscar") - Ronald
- Sunday in New York (1963) – Pilot Morgan (uncredited)
- The Alfred Hitchcock Hour (1964) (Season 3 Episode 3: "Water's Edge") - Mike Krause
- The Alfred Hitchcock Hour (1965) (Season 3 Episode 28: "Night Fever") - George Clark
- Guns of Diablo (1965) – Dan Macklin
- Shenandoah (1965) – Horace – Rebel Deserter (uncredited)
- Jesse James Meets Frankenstein's Daughter (1966) – Lonny Curry
- The Wild Bunch (1969) – Buck
- Kelly's Heroes (1970) - Soldier Hauling Maitland's Yacht (uncredited)
- The Hunting Party (1971) – Crimp
- Conquest of the Planet of the Apes (1972) – Riot Control Commander in Plaza (uncredited)
- Little Cigars (1973) – Gus
- Cahill U.S. Marshal (1973) – Pee Wee Simser
- Mitchell (1975) – Detective Tyzack
- Breakheart Pass (1975) – Sergeant Bellew
- Invisible Strangler (1978) – Sergeant Archer
- The Magic of Lassie (1978) – Reward Seeker
- The Dukes of Hazzard (1979–1985, TV Series) – U.S. Marshal Ken Collins
- Death Hunt (1981) – Trapper #3
