= William Reynolds (actor) =

American actor (1931–2022)

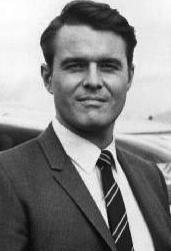
- Reynolds in 1969
- Born: William DeClercq Regnolds; December 9, 1931; Los Angeles, California, U.S.
- Died: August 24, 2022 (aged 90); Wildomar, California, U.S.
- Education: Pasadena City College
- Occupations: Actor, businessman
- Years active: 1951–1978, 1989
- Spouse: Molly Sinclair (m. 1950; died 1992)
- Children: 2

William DeClercq Reynolds (né Regnolds; December 9, 1931 – August 24, 2022) was an American actor. He was best known for his role as Special Agent Tom Colby in the 1960s television series The F.B.I. and his film and television roles during the 1950s through the 1970s.

== Early years ==
Reynolds was born in Los Angeles on December 9, 1931, the youngest of three sons. His mother died when he was five years old, and he was sent to boarding schools. He eventually attended Pasadena City College and worked in their radio department. His mother was a member of the Daughters of the American Revolution, however, William said "that sort of thing was never as important to me as it was to them," adding "It's kind of neat to know about, but that's as far as that goes for me." His mother was descended from Thomas Hinckley. Though he was of "almost entirely English ancestry" his mother also believed he was partially of Huguenot ancestry, which is why she gave him a French middle name, however, unlike his more famous ancestry, his Huguenot roots could not be confirmed.

== Film ==
After a talent agent spotted him in minor theatrical roles, Reynolds signed with Universal Studios in 1952 and began appearing in pictures such as Carrie (1952), where he had a prominent role as the son of Laurence Olivier. Reynolds was drafted into the United States Army in 1952, but en route to Korea he stayed in Japan doing radio work. He returned to Universal making horror film Cult of the Cobra (1955). He also appeared in the Douglas Sirk melodramas All That Heaven Allows (1955) and There's Always Tomorrow (1956), as well as in Sirk's comedy Has Anybody Seen My Gal (1953). He often played the son of the leading character, for example of Jane Wyman in All That Heaven Allows, Fred MacMurray in There's Always Tomorrow and Laurence Olivier in Carrie.

== Television ==
Reynolds became tired of his dull, stereotyped roles in the movies and began his move to television in 1958 when he guest starred in the episode "Rope of Cards" of the Maverick TV series with James Garner. He also served as the lead actor in episodes "Holiday at Hollow Rock" and "The Cure For Johnny Rain".

In 1959, he played the title role in Pete Kelly's Blues. During this series, he developed a close friendship with actor and producer Jack Webb. In 1960–1961, he starred as Sandy Wade on the ABC/Warner Bros. television series The Islanders. He also guest starred in 1961 as Jerry Bolton on the episode "Nobody's Millions" of another ABC/WB drama series, The Roaring 20s.

In 1961, Reynolds appeared as Johnny Tremayne in an episode of Cheyenne, “The Brahma Bull”.

In 1962–1963, Reynolds costarred on ABC's The Gallant Men. He then played Hoodoo Henderson as an adult in 1966's Walt Disney film Follow Me, Boys!.

Two years with no acting jobs led Reynolds to enhance his education, and he passed the examinations to become a lawyer specializing in real estate.

Reynolds got his big break co-starring with Efrem Zimbalist, Jr., in another ABC series, the long-running The F.B.I.. (replacing Stephen Brooks) Reynolds first made guest appearances in seasons one and two in 1966, before he appeared as series regular Special Agent Tom Colby from 1967 to 1973. He was replaced by actor Shelly Novack for the final season, because the network considered Reynolds, then at the age of forty-one, too old for the part. Still, he managed to make two appearances as Colby in the ninth season (1973–74), which included the final network-aired episode, a rerun of "The Animal," on September 8, 1974. (Note: "The Animal" originally aired February 17, 1974. Not to be confused with the Season 1 episode of the same name, which first aired April 17, 1966.)

He also appeared in guest roles in Jack Webb-produced shows such as Dragnet, and in other series of Rod Serling's The Twilight Zone, starring in the episode "The Purple Testament" (Season 1, Episode 19).

== Later years ==
Reynolds left show business after The F.B.I. ended its run and became a businessman.

== Personal life and death ==
Reynolds married Molly Sinclair, an actress, in 1950 and remained with her until her death in 1992. The couple had a daughter and two sons. One son died shortly after his birth.

On February 12, 1960, Reynolds and Richard L. Bare were injured when a plane, flying back to Miami after a filming of The Islanders, crashed in the Caribbean Sea. Reynolds suffered several broken ribs and broke his right ankle. The pair, along with two others, survived after swimming four miles to the coast of Jamaica. Reynolds has claimed this resulted in the postponement of "The Purple Testament", a Twilight Zone episode in which Reynolds' character sees his own death.

Reynolds died of pneumonia in Wildomar, California, on August 24, 2022, at the age of 90.

== Partial filmography ==
- Dear Brat (1951) - Robbie
- No Questions Asked (1951) - Floyd
- The Desert Fox: The Story of Rommel (1951) - Manfred Rommel (uncredited)
- The Cimarron Kid (1952) - Will Dalton (uncredited)
- The Battle at Apache Pass (1952) - Lem Bent
- Has Anybody Seen My Gal (1952) - Howard Blaisdell
- Francis Goes to West Point (1952) - Wilbur Van Allen
- Carrie (1952) - George Hurstwood, Jr.
- Son of Ali Baba (1952) - Mustapha
- The Raiders (1952) - Frank Morrell
- The Mississippi Gambler (1953) - Pierre Loyette
- Gunsmoke (1953) - Brazos
- Cult of the Cobra (1955) - Pete Norton
- There's Always Tomorrow (1955) - Vinnie Groves
- All That Heaven Allows (1955) - Ned Scott
- Away All Boats (1956) - Ens. Kruger
- Mister Cory (1957) - Alex Wyncott
- The Land Unknown (1957) - Lt. Jack Carmen
- The Big Beat (1958) - John Randall
- The Thing That Couldn't Die (1958) - Gordon Hawthorne
- Maverick (1958-1959, TV Series, 4 episodes) - Bill Gregg, Johnny Rain, Ted Blake
- Pete Kelly's Blues (1959, TV Series, 13 episodes) - Pete Kelly
- The Twilight Zone (1960, TV Series, 1 episode) - Lt. Fitzgerald
- The Islanders (1960–1961, TV Series, 24 episodes) - Sandy Wade
- The Gallant Men (1962–1963, TV Series, 26 episodes) - Capt. Jim Benedict
- A Distant Trumpet (1964) - 1st Lt. Teddy Mainwarring
- Follow Me, Boys! (1966) - Hoodoo Henderson - Man
- The F.B.I. (1966–1974, TV Series, 161 episodes) - Special Agent Tom Colby (1967–1974); SAC Kendall Lisbon / Franklin Benton (supporting roles, 1966–1967)
