= Ride Clear of Diablo =

1954 film by Jesse Hibbs

- Film poster by Reynold Brown
- Directed by: Jesse Hibbs
- Screenplay by: George Zuckerman
- Story by: Ellis Marcus; D. D. Beauchamp (additional dialogue)
- Produced by: John W. Rogers
- Starring: Audie Murphy; Dan Duryea; Susan Cabot; Abbe Lane
- Cinematography: Irving Glassberg
- Edited by: Edward Curtiss
- Music by: Milton Rosen; Herman Stein
- Production company: Universal Pictures
- Distributed by: Universal Pictures
- Release dates: February 10, 1954 (Los Angeles, California)
- Running time: 81 minutes
- Country: United States
- Language: English
- Box office: $1.1 million

Ride Clear of Diablo is a 1954 American Technicolor Western film directed by Jesse Hibbs starring Audie Murphy, Dan Duryea, Susan Cabot and Abbe Lane. made for Universal Pictures. Cabot and Murphy had appeared in two films together previously.

== Plot ==
Santiago's Sheriff Fred Kenyon and lawyer Tom Meredith conspire to have dance hall girl Kate entertain the hired hands of the O'Mara ranch while Kenyon and Meredith rustle the O'Maras' stock. Tom shoots both the father and his teenage son to leave no witnesses.

Surviving son Clay, a railroad surveyor in Denver, is informed of their deaths and goes to Santiago, where the identity of the murderers is unknown. Clay is talked out of revenge by the town Reverend but Clay makes his own inquiries to the sheriff and Tom. When Clay asks the sheriff if he can become his deputy in order to make an investigation, the sheriff at first refuses. Tom advises the sheriff that it would be a good idea to send Clay on a false trail to arrest notorious gunslinger Whitey Kincade in the town of Diablo. Kincade has no connection with the murders, but the corrupt pair assume that Kincade will kill the pesky Clay.

To everyone's surprise Clay out-draws Kincade, arrests him, thwarts Kincade's escape attempts, and successfully fights off an ambush from three men. Kenyon and Meredith persuade Jed Ringer to testify falsely in Kincade's favor at his trial, and he is acquitted.

Kenyon's niece Laurie is engaged to Meredith. She is unaware of Kenyon and Meredith's criminal activities. She finds herself becoming attracted to Clay, and when Meredith neglects her at a church social, she allows Clay to walk her home and kiss her.

Kincade, who spends his life by idling about, is bemused by the unstoppable Clay and watches him go after the real killers. At first, he does this for amusement, but gradually he realizes that the moral attitude of the much younger Clay is a valuable lesson in living a worthwhile life. Kincade's identification goes so far as to sacrifice himself to save the younger hero's life in several gunfights, all in accordance with the fact, that he told Clay that if ever he feels he's become "like a human being", he will shoot (meaning here, sacrifice) himself.

== Cast ==
- Audie Murphy as Clay O'Mara
- Susan Cabot as Laurie Kenyon
- Dan Duryea as Whitey Kincade
- Abbe Lane as Kate
- Russell Johnson as Jed Ringer
- Paul Birch as Sheriff Fred Kenyon
- William Pullen as Tom Meredith
- Jack Elam as Tim Lowerie
- Denver Pyle as Reverend Moorehead
