= The Wasp Woman =

1959 film by Roger Corman, Jack Hill

- Theatrical release poster
- Directed by: Roger Corman
- Screenplay by: Leo Gordon
- Story by: Kinta Zertuche
- Produced by: Roger Corman
- Starring: Susan Cabot; Fred Eisley; Barboura Morris; Bruno VeSota; Michael Mark; Frank Gerstle
- Cinematography: Harry Neumann
- Edited by: Carlo Lodato
- Music by: Fred Katz
- Production companies: The Filmgroup; Santa Cruz Productions
- Distributed by: Allied Artists
- Release date: June 1959
- Running time: 62 minutes (theatrical); 73 minutes (padded TV version)
- Country: United States
- Language: English
- Budget: $50,000 (estimated)

The Wasp Woman (1959) by Roger Corman

The Wasp Woman (also known as The Bee Girl and Insect Woman) is a 1959 American independent science-fiction horror film produced and directed by Roger Corman. Filmed in black-and-white, it stars Susan Cabot, Anthony Eisley, Michael Mark, Bruno VeSota and Barboura Morris. The film was originally released by Filmgroup on June 10, 1959 as a double feature with Beast from Haunted Cave (1959). To pad out the film's running time when it was released to television two years later, a new prologue was added by director Jack Hill.

== Plot ==
In the prologue, scientist Dr. Eric Zinthrop is fired from his job at a honey farm for experimenting with wasps.

The founder and owner of a large cosmetics company, Janice Starlin, is disturbed when her firm's sales begin to drop after it becomes apparent to her customer base that she is aging. Zinthrop has been able to extract enzymes from the royal jelly of the queen wasp that can reverse the aging process. Janice agrees to fund further research, at great cost, provided she can serve as his human subject. Displeased with the slowness of the results, she breaks into the scientist's laboratory after hours and injects herself with extra doses of the formula. Zinthrop becomes aware that some of the test creatures are becoming violent and goes to warn Janice, but before he can reach anyone, he is knocked down by a car. He is temporarily missing and Janice goes through great trouble to find him, eventually taking over his care.

Janice continues her clandestine use of the serum and sheds twenty years in a single weekend; however, she discovers that she is periodically transformed into a murderous, wasp-like creature. After Janice attacks several of her employees, Zinthrop throws a jar of carbolic acid at her face and she falls to her death out of a high window.

== Cast ==
- Susan Cabot as Janice Starlin
- Fred Eisley (aka Anthony Eisley) as Bill Lane
- Barboura Morris as Mary Dennison
- William Roerick as Arthur Cooper
- Michael Mark as Dr. Eric Zinthrop
- Frank Gerstle as Les Hellman
- Bruno VeSota as night watchman
- Roy Gordon as Max Thompson
- Carolyn Hughes as Jean Carson
- Lynn Cartwright as Maureen Reardon
- Frank Wolff as delivery man
- Lani Mars as Nurse Warren
- Philip Barry as delivery man
- Roger Corman as hospital doctor (uncredited)

== Production ==
The film was originally known as Insect Woman.

According to Roger Corman, he suggested the idea of a wasp serum to writer Leo Gordon because "that sounded more exciting" than using the royal jelly from bees.

The film was made for an estimated budget of $50,000 in less than two weeks.

Corman said that the prosthetic mask used for the Wasp Woman was "rather primitive." He noted that this was the first movie he had financed and directed for The Filmgroup, his production and distribution company.

In 1962, director Hill added 11 minutes to the film for its eventual television syndication release.

== Release ==
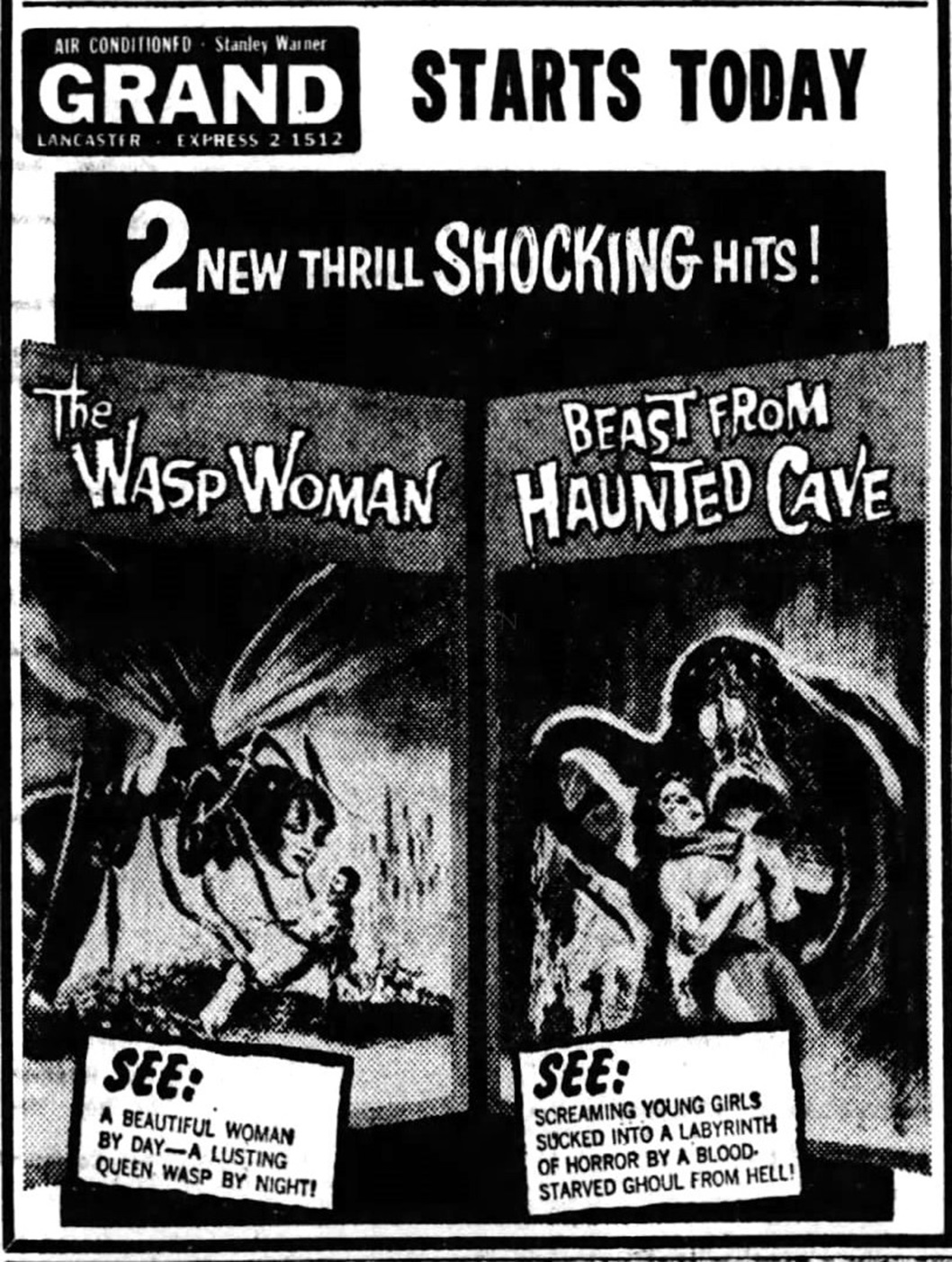
Advertisement from 1959 for The Wasp Woman and co-feature, Beast from Haunted Cave

The film was the third released by Filmgroup. It was released as a double feature with Beast from Haunted Cave. The film's theatrical release poster shows a creature with the head of a woman and the body of a wasp, but the Wasp Woman depicted in the film is exactly the opposite of this.

According to Tim Dirks, The Wasp Woman was one of a wave of "cheap teen movies" released for the drive-in market. They consisted of "exploitative, cheap fare created especially for them [teens] in a newly-established teen/drive-in genre".

The film was included in a package called "The Exploitables" released by Allied Artists in 1963 for television broadcast.

The film was re-released as part of the "100th Anniversary of Monster Movies" in March 2010.

=== Soundtrack ===
The Wasp Woman's musical score, written by Fred Katz, was originally composed for the film A Bucket of Blood. According to Mark Thomas McGee, author of Roger Corman: The Best of the Cheap Acts, each time Katz was called upon to write music for Corman, he sold the same score as if it were new music. The score was used in a total of seven films, including The Little Shop of Horrors and Creature from the Haunted Sea.

== Reception ==
On Rotten Tomatoes the film has a 45% rating based on 11 reviews, with an average rating of 4.7 out of 10.

Variety declared that the "film has interesting points and looks polished but it's pretty slow and not very frightening". Charles Stinson of the Los Angeles Times wrote: "Leo Gordon's script is smoothly urbane with nice surprising little touches of humor here and there. Slim, intense, brunette Susan Cabot, who always impresses, does excellently nuanced work as the neurotic lady with the worries and the wasps". The Monthly Film Bulletin stated: "The earlier, more realistic scenes of this modest shocker, which is slow to get going, are pretty unlikely, while the later bouts of fantasy are ludicrous rather than terrifying. Routine stuff, in fact, for determined enthusiasts only". Film critic Leonard Maltin gave the film a mostly positive 2 1/2 out of 4 stars. TV Guide gave the film a negative review, awarding it a score of 1 out of 4, and calling the film "laughable". Allmovie gave a negative review, criticizing the film's "ludicrous" monster costume, special effects, and low budget.

=== Parodies ===
On April 6, 2008, Cinematic Titanic did a live riff on the film to a theater audience. It was released on DVD on August 7. In the Courage the Cowardly Dog episode "Night of the Weremole", Muriel can be seen watching The Wasp Woman, which she describes as "her favorite show".

=== Cinema Insomnia ===
In 2007, The Wasp Woman was shown on the horror hosted television series Cinema Insomnia. Apprehensive Films later released the Cinema Insomnia episode on DVD.

== Remakes ==
Rejuvenatrix (also known as The Rejuvenator) was inspired by Corman's film, with some critics calling it "a 1988 version of The Wasp Woman".

In 1995, a remake of The Wasp Woman was produced for the Roger Corman Presents series. The remake was directed by Jim Wynorski, and starred Jennifer Rubin as Janice Starlin.

== See also ==
- The Fly (1958 film)
- The Wolf Man (1941 film)
- List of American films of 1959
- List of films in the public domain in the United States
