= Machine-Gun Kelly (film) =

1958 film by Roger Corman

- Theatrical release poster
- Directed by: Roger Corman
- Screenplay by: R. Wright Campbell
- Produced by: Roger Corman
- Starring: Charles Bronson; Susan Cabot; Morey Amsterdam; Richard Devon; Jack Lambert
- Cinematography: Floyd Crosby
- Edited by: Ronald Sinclair
- Music by: Gerald Fried
- Production company: El Monte Productions
- Distributed by: American International Pictures
- Release date: May 1958
- Running time: 80 minutes
- Country: United States
- Language: English
- Budget: $100,000
- Box office: 138,293 admissions (France)

Machine-Gun Kelly is a 1958 American gangster film noir produced and directed by Roger Corman, from a screenplay by R. Wright Campbell, loosely based on the criminal exploits of George "Machine Gun" Kelly and his wife Kathryn Kelly. It stars Charles Bronson as the titular character, his first leading role in a feature film, and Susan Cabot as his wife and partner-in-crime (fictionalized as ‘Flo Becker’).

Despite its low budget, the film received a positive critical reception. Corman called the film "a major turning point in my career," because it was the first for which he had received serious critical attention.

== Plot ==
George Kelly, dubbed "Machine Gun" by his partner in crime Flo Becker because of his obsession with Thompson submachine guns, robs a bank and eventually becomes public enemy #1. Discord grows among his inner circle, and Kelly, afraid of being jailed or killed, is dominated and ridiculed by the tough-talking Flo.

A botched robbery causes their partner Michael Fandango to lose an arm. Kelly, goaded by Flo, kidnaps the daughter of a wealthy businessman for ransom. Fandango identifies him to the police but is killed by one of Kelly's gang as the house is surrounded.

Kelly intends to surrender, if only to receive a more lenient sentence and avoid execution. Flo again questions his nerve, and Kelly slugs her. Both are taken to jail.

== Cast ==
- Charles Bronson as George "Machine Gun" Kelly
- Susan Cabot as Florence "Flo" Becker (based on Kathryn Kelly)
- Morey Amsterdam as Michael Fandango
- Richard Devon as Apple
- Jack Lambert as Howard
- Frank DeKova as Harry
- Connie Gilchrist as "Ma" Becker (Ora Brooks)
- Wally Campo as Maize
- Barboura Morris as Lynn Grayson
- Dawn Menzer as Sherryl Vito
- George Archambeault as Frank
- Robert Griffin as Andrew Vito (Charles F. Urschel)
- Michael Fox as Detective Clinton
- Larry Thor as Detective Drummond
- Shirley Falls as Martha
- Jay Sayer as Philip Ashton
- Mitzi McCall as Harriet
- Ted Thorpe as Teddy

Credits from the AFI Catalog of Feature Films.

== Production ==
Roger Corman said he had been attracted to Kelly's story because of how the gangster had meekly surrendered. Corman hired Robert Wright Campbell as screenwriter and said that Campbell "wrote a very good script with strong, well-sketched characters," based a great deal on the facts. Corman had hired R. Wright Campbell on the strength of his previous work, especially Five Guns West.

The film was announced in December 1957. It was intended to replace The Land of Prehistoric Women on Corman's schedule. AIP regular Dick Miller was originally announced as the star, and in early January, Susan Cabot was announced as the female lead. However, Campbell lobbied Corman to cast his brother William Campbell as Kelly and began tailoring the script to play to his strengths. To avoid internal squabbling, Corman gave the role to Charles Bronson, for whom it was his first appearance in a lead role.

Susan Cabot said that the film was the "most satisfactory" of the six that she made with Corman, in part because of what she called the "fun thing going on" between her character and Bronson's and the strength of her relationship with Bronson.

The film was shot in ten days for $60,000.

== Release ==
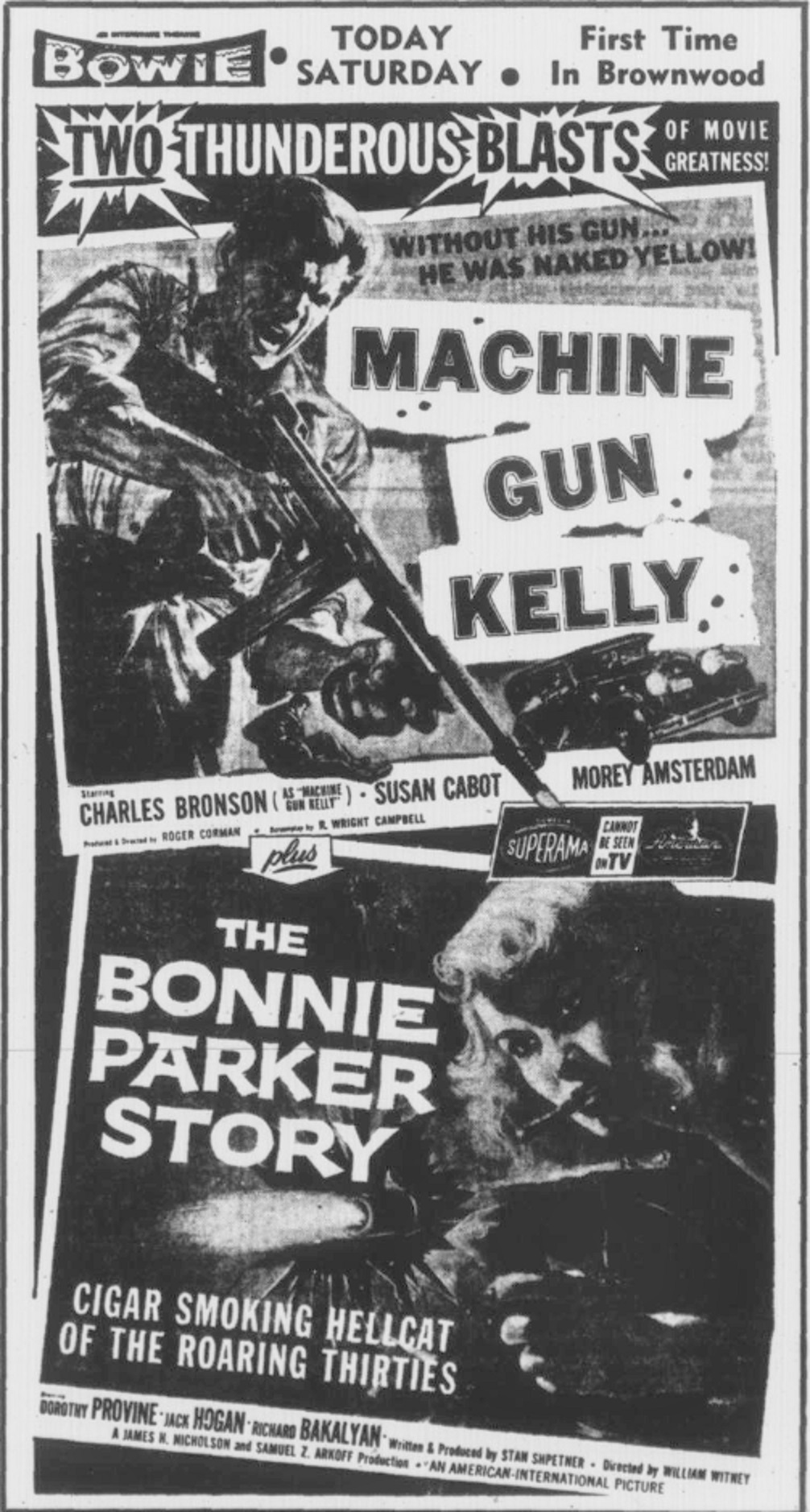
1958 advertisement for Machine Gun Kelly and its co-feature The Bonnie Parker Story.

American International Pictures released the film in May 1958, on a double feature with The Bonnie Parker Story.

== Reception ==
The Los Angeles Times called Machine-Gun Kelly a "sleeper" with "a very good screenplay" in which Bronson makes Kelly "a full, three dimensional human being."

The film was reasonably successful in the U.S. but fared well in Europe, and Corman's work was examined in journals such as Cahiers du Cinéma.

== See also ==
- List of American films of 1958
- List of Hood films

== Notes ==
- Corman, Roger; Jerome, Jim (1998). How I Made a Hundred Movies in Hollywood and Never Lost a Dime. Da Capo Press.
