= The Desperado =

1954 film by Thomas Carr

- Theatrical release poster
- Directed by: Thomas Carr
- Screenplay by: Daniel Mainwaring
- Based on: The Desperado; 1950 novel by Clifton Adams
- Produced by: Vincent M. Fennelly
- Starring: Wayne Morris; Jimmy Lydon; Beverly Garland; Rayford Barnes; Dabbs Greer; Lee Van Cleef
- Cinematography: Joe Novak
- Edited by: Sam Fields
- Music by: Raoul Kraushaar
- Production company: Allied Artists Pictures
- Distributed by: Allied Artists Pictures
- Release date: June 20, 1954
- Running time: 80 minutes
- Country: United States
- Language: English

The Desperado is a 1954 American Western film directed by Thomas Carr and written by Daniel Mainwaring. It is based on the 1950 novel The Desperado by Clifton Adams. The film stars Wayne Morris, Jimmy Lydon, Beverly Garland, Rayford Barnes, Dabbs Greer and Lee Van Cleef. It was released on June 20, 1954 by Allied Artists Pictures.

== Cast ==
- Wayne Morris as Sam Garrett
- Jimmy Lydon as Tom Cameron
- Beverly Garland as Laurie Bannerman
- Rayford Barnes as Ray Novak
- Dabbs Greer as Jim Langley
- Lee Van Cleef as Paul Clayton / Buck Clayton
- Nestor Paiva as Captain Jake Thornton
- Roy Barcroft as Martin Novack
- John Dierkes as Sergeant Rafferty
- Richard Shackleton as Pat Garner
- I. Stanford Jolley as Mr. Garner
- Richard Garland as Trooper
- Florence Lake as Mrs. Cameron
- Lyle Talbot as judge(uncredited)
