= The Astounding She-Monster =

1958 film

- Theatrical release poster by Albert Kallis
- Directed by: Ronnie Ashcroft
- Screenplay by: Frank Hall
- Story by: Frank Hall; Ronnie Ashcroft
- Produced by: Ronnie Ashcroft
- Starring: Robert Clarke; Kenne Duncan; Shirley Kilpatrick
- Narrated by: Scott Douglas
- Cinematography: William C. Thompson
- Edited by: Ronnie Ashcroft
- Music by: Gene Kauer
- Production company: Hollywood International Production
- Distributed by: American International Pictures
- Release date: January 26, 1958
- Running time: 62 minutes
- Country: United States
- Language: English
- Budget: $18,000

The Astounding She-Monster is a 1958 science fiction horror film starring Robert Clarke and directed, co-written and produced by Ronnie Ashcroft for Hollywood International Productions. The film focuses on a geologist, a gang which has kidnapped a rich heiress, and their encounter with a beautiful but deadly female alien who has crashed to Earth.

The film was released in American theaters on January 26, 1958 by American International Pictures on a double feature with Roger Corman's The Saga of the Viking Women and Their Voyage to the Waters of the Great Sea Serpent. In the UK, it was released as The Mysterious Invader. Edward D. Wood, Jr. was an unofficial "consultant" on the film.

== Plot ==
In outer space, there is a planet where its people fear that if the Earth is not destroyed first, it will destroy the universe. Because of this, the planet's inhabitants decide to contact Earth.

In the United States, gangsters Nat Burdell and Brad Conley kidnap wealthy socialite Margaret Chaffee and, joined by gun moll Esther Malone, head for the San Gabriel Mountains to await the ransom they have demanded from Chaffee's father. That night, geologist Dick Cutler sees what he thinks is a meteor crash into the forest. But he does not see that out of the smoke from the impact emerges a glowing blonde female extraterrestrial in a skintight leotard who can kill by touch.

The gangsters hole up at Cutler's cabin. When the alien peeks through a window, Burdell orders Conley to go after her, but the alien kills Conley, his gunshots having no effect on her whatsoever. Burdell then goes out and runs into the alien himself. Although his gunshots are also ineffective, the alien walks away backwards, allowing Burdell to retrieve Conley's body. Back at the cabin, Cutler says that Conley died of "radium poisoning" and that by carrying his body, Burdell has taken a potentially lethal dose of radium and needs to get to a doctor before he dies.

Burdell decides that they should flee that night, even though they will have to navigate a dangerous mountain road in Cutler's headlight-less Jeep. Before they can leave, the alien smashes through the cabin's window. Everyone runs outside. The alien catches Malone and kills her. When the alien tries to grab Burdell, he quickly sidesteps and she tumbles down an embankment. Burdell wrongly thinks that she is dead. Cutler and Chaffee have already run back to the cabin. Burdell demands that they leave at once. But as they drive off, the extraterrestrial stops them and kills Burdell.

With all the gangsters dead, Cutler and Chaffee run to the cabin again. Cutler speculates that the alien's body is made of radium and platinum, which protect her from the Earth's atmosphere. He mixes an acid solution that will kill her. When she comes into the cabin, he throws the bottle of acid at her. She is killed and disintegrates.

However, a locket she was wearing is undamaged. Cutler finds in it a note, written in English, from the "Master of the Council of Planets of the Galaxy." It is an invitation to Earth to join the Council. Cutler now realizes that the alien was a peaceful emissary who killed only in self-defense. Chaffee says that the Council, with its "superior wisdom," will surely understand that their human nature caused them to fear the alien and that another emissary will no doubt be sent. Cutler agrees, although he asks rhetorically, "But will it come to bring us good will or simply avenge her death?"

== Cast ==
- Robert Clarke as Dick Cutler
- Kenne Duncan as Nat Burdell
- Marilyn Harvey as Margaret Chaffee
- Jeanne Tatum as Esther Malone
- Shirley Kilpatrick as The She-Monster
- Ewing Miles Brown as Brad Conley (credit as Ewing Brown)
- Al Avalon as Radio Newscaster (uncredited)
- Scott Douglas as Narrator (uncredited)

== Production ==
The film was picked up for distribution by American International Pictures (AIP) and issued as half of one of its double feature programs. Edward D. Wood, Jr. was an unofficial "consultant" on the film. Ashcroft and Wood knew each other, Ashcroft having been assistant director on Wood's Night of the Ghouls. The working titles of The Astounding She-Monster were Naked Invader and The Astounding She Creature. Naked Invader was dropped "to please the censor" and the film became The Astounding She-Monster.

Few locations were used for the film. Critic Bill Warren notes that interior shots were done "in one poor mountain cabin set" and exterior shots "in some well-traveled woods nearby." Frazier National Park, outside of Los Angeles; Griffith Park in Los Angeles; and Larchmont Studios in Hollywood are named as specific locations.

According to the American Film Institute (AFI), The Astounding She-Monster was originally planned as a $50,000 production with a seven-day shooting schedule. But film critic Bryan Senn writes that the film actually only cost $18,000 to make and was sold to AIP for $60,000. Warren says the film was completed in just four days and that costs were minimized by such things as having an uncredited film editor work "in Ashcroft's living room." The Internet Movie Data Base (IMDb) identifies the uncredited film editor as Ashcroft himself.

The four-day shooting schedule had an unexpected effect on Kilpatrick. On the first day of filming, the back of her costume split open when she bent over. Without time for repairs, she was directed, for the rest of the film, to walk backwards out of all the scenes that she had walked into frontwards. According to Clarke, "Shirley was big in the behind and big in the bosom. As an actress, she didn't do a lot and she didn't have to. She had all that other stuff going for her."

Salaries for the actors were reasonable, according to Clarke, who told film critic Tom Weaver in an interview that "Ashcroft paid me $500 a week, which I thought was a good salary for this type of picture, and he promised me 4 percent of his producer's share. Thanks to his honesty and integrity, over the period of the next eighteen months or so I made a couple thousand bucks!" Clarke also said that "a very minimal crew - one gaffer, a helper for him, one cameraman and one sound man" - was used on the film. Still, Clarke seemed to not be happy with the finished product. Critic Mark Thomas McGee quotes him as saying, "It was kind of a piece of junk. Certainly I couldn't be very proud of having been in it."

Most prints of the film bear a 1957 copyright. However, the film was not formally copyrighted until 7 January 1985, when it was registered as copyrighted by Ronnie Ashcroft Productions.

== Release ==
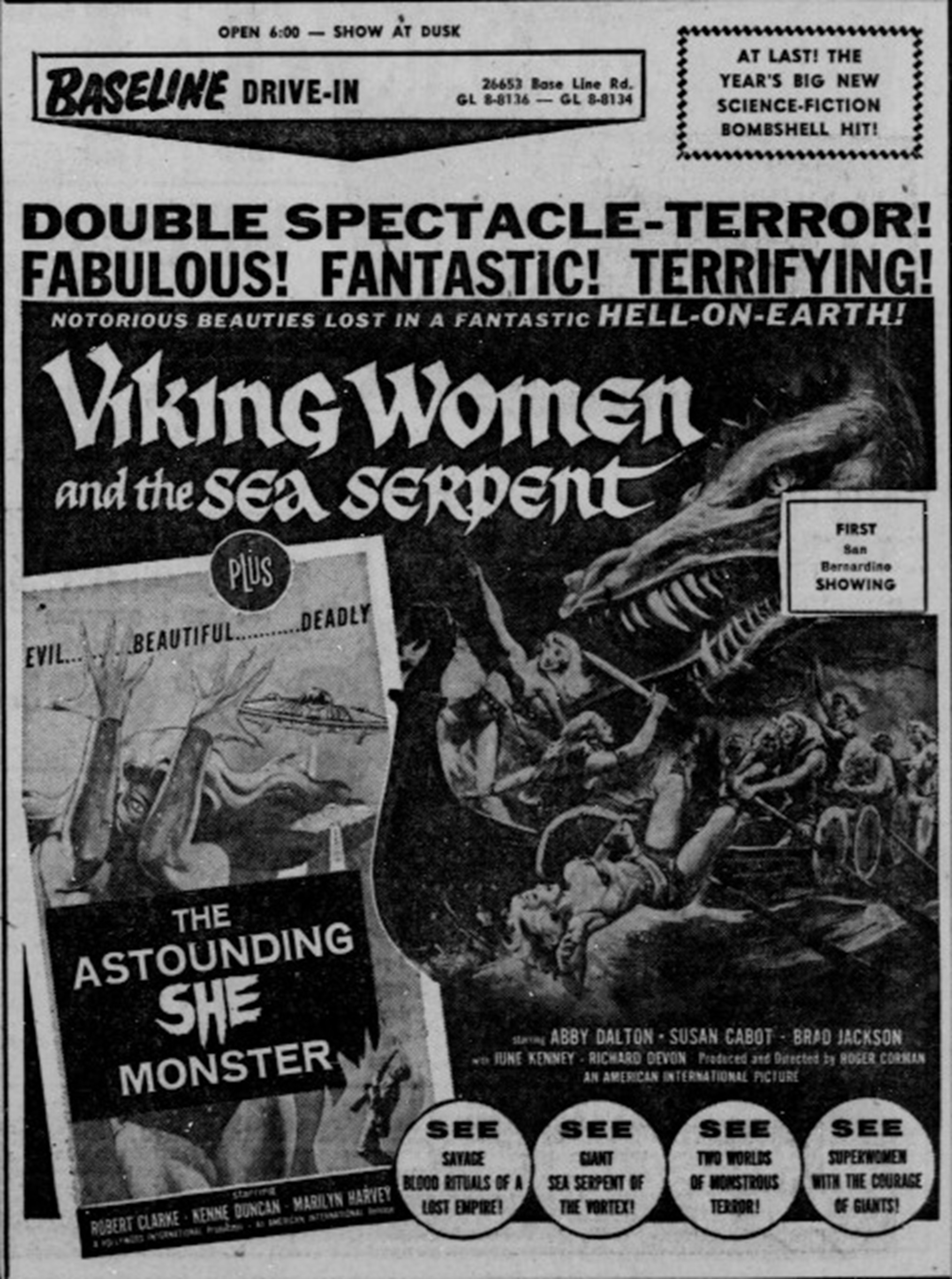
Drive-in advertisement from 1958 for The Astounding She-Monster and co-feature, The Viking Women and the Sea Serpent.

The Astounding She-Monster was released in American theaters on January 26, 1958 by American International Pictures on a double feature with Roger Corman's The Saga of the Viking Women and Their Voyage to the Waters of the Great Sea Serpent.

When the movie was released in the UK, under the title The Mysterious Invader, it was distributed by Anglo-Amalgamated. The British Board of Film Censors (BBFC) granted it an A-certificate on March 31, 1958. The A-certificate meant that the film was considered to be "more suitable for adults" than for children, but unlike many American films that were shown in Great Britain at the time, nothing was cut from it. It was also released in Italy (as Lei, il Monstro) and Mexico (as Invasora de Jupiter), although at unspecified dates.

The movie stayed in domestic theatrical circulation for a number of years. For example, a 1962 newspaper advertisement from Maryland shows that The Astounding She-Monster was the last film in a four-feature "Giant Horror Show" at the New Albert Theater in Baltimore. The first three movies were A Bucket of Blood, Attack of the Giant Leeches and Attack of the Puppet People.

On television, clips from the film were used in the made-for-television "documentary" Bride of Monster Mania, which was hosted by Elvira and shown shortly before Halloween 2000 on AMC. The entire film was shown as an episode of the TV series Pale Moonlight Theater on 19 January 2015.

The Astounding She-Monster has gotten a wide release for home viewing, with at least 12 distributors handling the film over the years. Wade Williams Productions had the first worldwide all media release of the film in 1987. In the US, Englewood Entertainment was the first to issue the film on VHS and the first DVD was released by Image Entertainment in 2000. No information about home distribution outside the US, other than by Wade Williams Productions, could be found.

== Reception ==
Perhaps because The Astounding She-Monster was a low-budget second feature on a double bill, contemporary reviews of it are difficult to locate. Warren reproduces in his book parts of two reviews from the time the movie was playing in theaters. He notes that while The Monthly Film Bulletin gave the movie its lowest rating and called it a "feeble and ridiculous contribution to the science fiction library, weakly scripted and poorly acted," The Motion Picture Herald gave it a "fair" rating and said in its review that "the overall effect is one of satisfying melodrama."

More recent reviewers appear to dislike almost everything about the film. Critic Paul Meehan writes, "There's absolutely nothing astounding about The Astounding She-Monster unless it's how astoundingly bad the movie is. Director Ashcroft employs static wide shots in most scenes, with little in the way of dynamic editing to enliven the action. The acting and screenplay are pedestrian, and while the alien femme fatale might have been made into an intriguing, complex character, she is rendered mute and reduced to a homicidal cipher."

Besides describing the film as a "boring, dismal little picture," Warren dislikes the narration, calling it "portentous" and "doom-laden," and saying that it "simply serves to slow the snail-like pace, generating a maddening frustration in those paying attention." Further, he notes that revealing at the end of the film that the She-Monster was actually a peaceful emissary does not work well within the narrative. "It adds nothing to the film and instead brings only into sharper relief all the rottenness of the picture, especially the hypocrisy of the filmmakers, which makes the movie seem far more distasteful than movies of the earlier '50s, including Phantom from Space, which is otherwise similar."

Senn takes issue with the way the movie looks on-screen. "Throughout the film, Ashcroft's direction remains flat, as he rarely moves the camera and fails to utilize even moderately interesting angles or setups." He calls it an example of "the no-budget theory of filmmaking," which makes The Astounding She-Monster "dull" and "tedious" as "the various players meander through the same exact woods, using the same exact camera setups."

For British critic Phil Hardy, "The only point of interest in this clumsily directed, silly film is its misogynistic attitude toward women in its association of female beauty with evil, and unconventional independence with male fears of castration. The point is even more forceful for being so unselfconsciously expressed in [Frank] Hall's wooden screenplay."

Critic Gus Barsanti, after describing the She-Monster as "a very tall, high-heeled femme alien fatale in an obligatory skintight space outfit and very scary eyebrows," says the film is for "connoisseurs of truly bad movies; all others should approach with caution."

Nevertheless, the 1958 theatrical release poster for The Astounding She-Monster was selected for an exhibition of 35 "visually arresting posters" for B-movies at the Binghamton University. The exhibition ran during May and June 2016.

== See also ==
- List of American films of 1958
