= Richard Devon =

American actor (1926–2010)

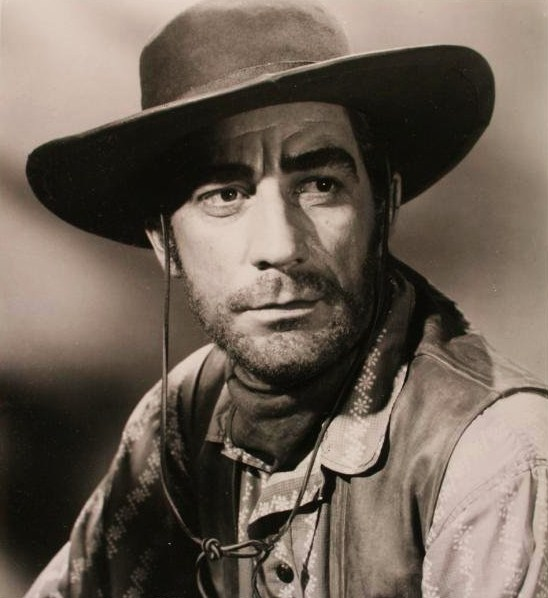
- Devon in The Comancheros (1961)
- Born: Richard Gibson Ferraiole; December 11, 1926; Glendale, California, U.S.
- Died: February 26, 2010 (aged 83); Mill Valley, California, U.S.
- Occupation: Actor
- Years active: 1949–1988
- Spouse: Patricia A. Riopelle (m. 1959)

Richard Devon (born Richard Gibson Ferraiole; December 11, 1926 – February 26, 2010) was an American character actor and voice actor who between the late 1940s and 1991 performed in hundreds of roles on stage, radio, television, and in feature films.

== Early life ==
Devon was born in Glendale, California in 1926, the only son of four children of Florence H. (née Glass) and Luca Ferraiole. His father, a native of Italy, immigrated to the United States in 1901 and lived in Pennsylvania before moving to California, where by 1930 he was employed as a waiter in a Los Angeles cafe.

To supplement his family's modest income, Devon later worked part-time as a stable boy and then as a riding instructor at an equestrian academy in Griffith Park. That early experience with horses proved useful in his acting career, especially in Western films and television series. Following his graduation from high school, Devon worked as a mail carrier at Monogram Pictures, a laborer at a plant nursery, a mechanic's helper, and as a doorman at the Hollywood Palladium.

== Career ==
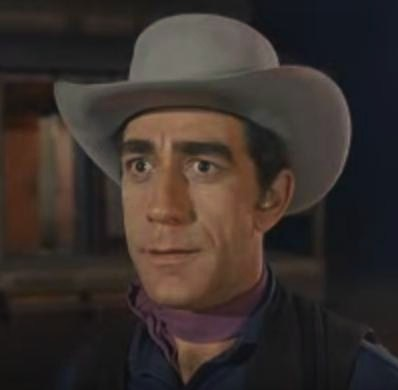
Devon in the television series Bonanza in "The Avenger", 1960

In the 1950s Devon began performing as a character actor in many Four Star Television series, although his work was not limited to a single production company or network. He played, for example, the role of Joe Nord, a gangster, in a 1958 episode of Peter Gunn. He appears, for example, as Ed Pike in the 1959 episode "Yellow Fever" of the Western series Colt .45, which was produced by Warner Bros. and originally broadcast by ABC.

Devon's television credits include Richard Diamond, Private Detective (three episodes), Tales of Wells Fargo, The Life and Legend of Wyatt Earp, and Johnny Ringo (in the episode "The Posse"). In 1959 he appeared on Wagon TrainS3 E8 "The Felizia Kingdom Story" as Frenchy.

He guest-starred on seven episodes of The Rifleman from 1959 to 1962: "Blood Brother" as Jethroe, "The Spiked Rifle" as Stark, "The Grasshopper" as Ryerson, "The Silent Knife" as Macowan, "Miss Milly" as Adams, "The Stand-In" as Potter and "The Most Amazing Man" as Lovett.

Devon appeared on Space Patrol, Trackdown starring Robert Culp (three episodes, including the pilot episode of that series, "Badge of Honor," which aired initially on Dick Powell's Zane Grey Theatre), The Tall Man, Gunsmoke (in the episodes "Ex-Con" and "The Quest for Asa Janin"), Highway Patrol as a hitchhiker, The Rebel, The Virginian (as Haskell in the 1970 episode "You Can Lead a Horse to Water") and its spin-off.

He guest-starred on Bonanza (four episodes from 1960-1967: "The Avenger", "The Trail Gang", "The Scapegoat" and "A Bride for Buford"), Laredo, Daniel Boone, The Monkees, Lassie, The Twilight Zone episode "Dead Man's Shoes" in 1962, three episodes of Perry Mason from 1964–1966, and Mission: Impossible.

Devon had a regular role as well as on the CBS series Yancy Derringer, performing the part of Jody Barker, a pickpocket and sometime cohort of the lead character played by Jock Mahoney. He also played the role of Cole Striker, a crook, in the 1963 episode "Incident of the Buryin' Man" on CBS's Rawhide.

He provided the voice of Batman on episodes of the radio version of The Adventures of Superman.

Devon's big screen career consists of at least two dozen feature films. Some of those productions are The Undead, War of the Satellites, The Three Stooges Go Around the World in a Daze, The Comancheros, and the Battle of Blood Island.

== Personal life and death ==
In December 1959, Devon married Patricia A. Riopelle. They remained together for over 50 years, until Devon died of vascular disease in Mill Valley, California in 2010, aged 83.

== Filmography ==
Year	Title	Role	Notes
1952	Scorching Fury	Kirk Flamer	
1955	The Prodigal	Risafe	
1956	Highway Patrol	Mr. Gorman, hitchiker	S1:E35 "Runaway Boy"
1957	The Undead	Satan	
1957	The Buckskin Lady	townsman	uncredited
1957	3:10 to Yuma	Wade gang member	uncredited
1957	Escape from San Quentin	Roy Gruber	
1957	Teenage Doll	Det. Dunston	
1957	Blood of Dracula	Det. Sgt. Stewart	
1957	The Saga of the Viking Women and Their Voyage to the Waters of the Great Sea Serpent	Stark	
1958	Machine-Gun Kelly	Apple	
1958	War of the Satellites	Dr. Pol Van Ponder	
1958	Badman's Country	Harvey Logan	
1958	The Badlanders	prison guard	uncredited
1958	Money, Women and Guns	Setting Sun	
1959	Gunfighters of Abilene	Marty Ruger	
1959 - 1962	The Rifleman	Jethroe, Stark, Ryerson, Macowan, Adams, Potter, Lovett	
1960	Battle of Blood Island	Moe	
1961	The Comancheros	Esteban	
1962	Kid Galahad	Marvin	
1963	Cattle King	Vince Bodine	
1963	The Three Stooges Go Around the World in a Daze	Maharajah	
1964	Perry Mason	Marion Devlin	S7, E20 "The Case of the Frightened Fisherman"
1966	The Silencers	Domino	
1967	The Monkees	Victor	S1:E22, "Monkees at the Circus"
1968	Three Guns for Texas	Max	
1973	Magnum Force	Carmine Ricca	
1974	Planet of the Apes	Zandar	
1988	The Seventh Sign	second cardinal	
