= Norman A. Fox =

American novelist

Norman Fox
- Born: Norman Arnold Fox; May 26, 1911; Sault Ste. Marie, Michigan
- Died: March 24, 1960 (aged 48); Great Falls, Montana
- Occupation: Novelist
- Writing career
- Genre: Western fiction

Norman Arnold Fox (May 26, 1911 – March 24, 1960) was an American author best known for Western stories and novels. His stories were often set around actual events in Montana history and contained authentic detail for the period. Norman's works were adapted into radio programs, live television and motion pictures.

== Biography ==
Norman Arnold Fox was born May 26, 1911, in Sault Ste. Marie, Michigan to Alfred and Florence Pearl Fox. The family moved to Montana in 1916 to homestead but eventually settled in Great Falls. Norman developed a love of the Old West and began dabbling with writing while in high school. He sold his first story in 1933 and turned to writing full-time in late 1937 when he lost his job due to the Great Depression. While initially writing short stories for pulp magazines such as Western Story Magazine, Norman succeeded in having his first novel published in 1940.

For the rest of his life Norman continued writing short stories while publishing one to two novels per year. His popularity was greatest in the mid-1950s when his stories were regularly filmed, "making the author a brief star of sorts to the film community" (Herzberg 2005). The films made from his novels featured such stars as: Randolph Scott, Audie Murphy, Tony Curtis, and James Stewart.

Norman was in the prime of his career when his life was cut short by cancer. He died on March 24, 1960, and is buried in Great Falls, Montana.

== Works ==
=== Books ===
Year	Title	Genre	Publisher
1941	The Gunsight Kid	Western	Phoenix Press
1941	Gun Handy	Western	Phoenix Press
1942	The Six Gun Syndicate	Western	Phoenix Press
1942	The Stampede Kid	Western	Phoenix Press
1943	Lord Six Gun	Western	Phoenix Press
1944	The Thundering Trail	Western	Dodd, Mead & Co.
1945	Thorson of Thunder Gulch	Western	Dodd, Mead & Co.
1945	Silent in the Saddle	Western	Dodd, Mead & Co.
1946	Dead End Trail	Western	Dodd, Mead & Co.
1946	The Valley of the Vanishing Riders	Western	Dodd, Mead & Co.
1947	Cactus Cavalier	Western	Dodd, Mead & Co.
1947	The Rider from Yonder	Western	Dodd, Mead & Co.
1948	The Devil's Saddle	Western	Dodd, Mead & Co.
1948	The Feathered Sombrero	Western	Dodd, Mead & Co.
1949	The Thirsty Land	Western	Dodd, Mead & Co.
1949	Shadow on the Range	Western	Dodd, Mead & Co.
1950	Stormy in the West	Western	Dodd, Mead & Co.
1950	The Phantom Spur	Western	Dodd, Mead & Co.
1951	Roughshod	Western	Dodd, Mead & Co.
1951	Tall Man Riding	Western	Dodd, Mead & Co.
1951	The Longhorn Legion	Western	Dell
1952	Ghostly Hoofbeats	Western	Dodd, Mead & Co.
1953	Long Lightning	Western	Dodd, Mead & Co.
1953	The Rawhide Years	Western	Dodd, Mead & Co.
1954	Broken Wagon	Western	Dodd, Mead & Co.
1956	Night Passage	Western	Dodd, Mead & Co.
1956	War on the Range aka The Rider from Yonder	Western	Fawcett
1956	Stranger from Arizona originally as "Winchester Cut" by Mark Sabin (1951) Fawcett	Western	Dodd, Mead & Co.
1957	The Badlands Beyond	Western	Dodd, Mead & Co.
1957	The Valiant Ones Short Stories	Western	Dodd, Mead & Co.
1958	Rope the Wind	Western	Dodd, Mead & Co.
1959	Reckoning at Rimbow	Western	Dodd, Mead & Co.
1960	The Hard Pursued	Western	Dodd, Mead & Co.
1961	The Trembling Hills	Western	Dodd, Mead & Co.
1968	They Rode the Shining Hills Short Stories	Western	Dodd, Mead & Co.

=== Films ===
- Gunsmoke (1953) from the novel "Roughshod" (1951)
- Tall Man Riding (1955) from the novel "Tall Man Riding" (1951)
- The Rawhide Years (1955) from the novel "The Rawhide Years" (1953)
- Night Passage (1957) from the novel "Night Passage" (1956)
