= Norman Fox (cricketer) =

Australian cricketer

Personal information
- Born: 29 July 1904; Longueville, New South Wales, Australia
- Died: 7 May 1972 (aged 67); Castle Cove, New South Wales, Australia
- Source: ESPNcricinfo, 28 December 2016

Norman Fox (29 July 1904 – 7 May 1972) was an Australian cricketer. He played two first-class matches for New South Wales in 1926/27.

== See also ==
- List of New South Wales representative cricketers
