= Sorority Girl =

1957 film by Roger Corman

- Film poster by Albert Kallis
- Directed by: Roger Corman
- Written by: Leo Lieberman; Ed Waters
- Produced by: Roger Corman
- Starring: Susan Cabot; Barboura Morris
- Music by: Ronald Stein
- Production company: Sunset Productions
- Distributed by: American International Pictures
- Release date: October 1957
- Running time: 62 mins.
- Country: United States
- Language: English

Sorority Girl (also known as Sorority House or The Bad One) is a 1957 film noir exploitation film directed by Roger Corman. It stars Susan Cabot as Sabra, a sociopath who plays a very disruptive role in a sorority, with Barboura Morris, Dick Miller and June Kenney. It was released by American International Pictures as a double feature with Motorcycle Gang.

In England, it was known as The Bad One. The film was remade in 1994 as Confessions of a Sorority Girl.

== Plot ==
A spoiled rich girl named Sabra Tanner, who feels ignored by her rich mother, teases and harasses her college schoolmates even though she does not know why she wants to hurt all the people around her. Her sociopathic antics bring bad consequences for her when her actions drive one of her classmates to attempt suicide. Realizing she is completely ostracized, Sabra walks into the ocean to drown herself.

== Cast ==
- Susan Cabot as Sabra Tanner
- Dick Miller as Mort
- Barboura Morris (credited as Barboura O'Neill) as Rita Joyce
- June Kenney as Tina
- Fay Baker as Mrs. Tanner
- Barbara Cowan (credited as Barbara Crane) as Ellie Marshall
- Jeane Wood as Mrs. Fessenden, the housemother

== Production ==
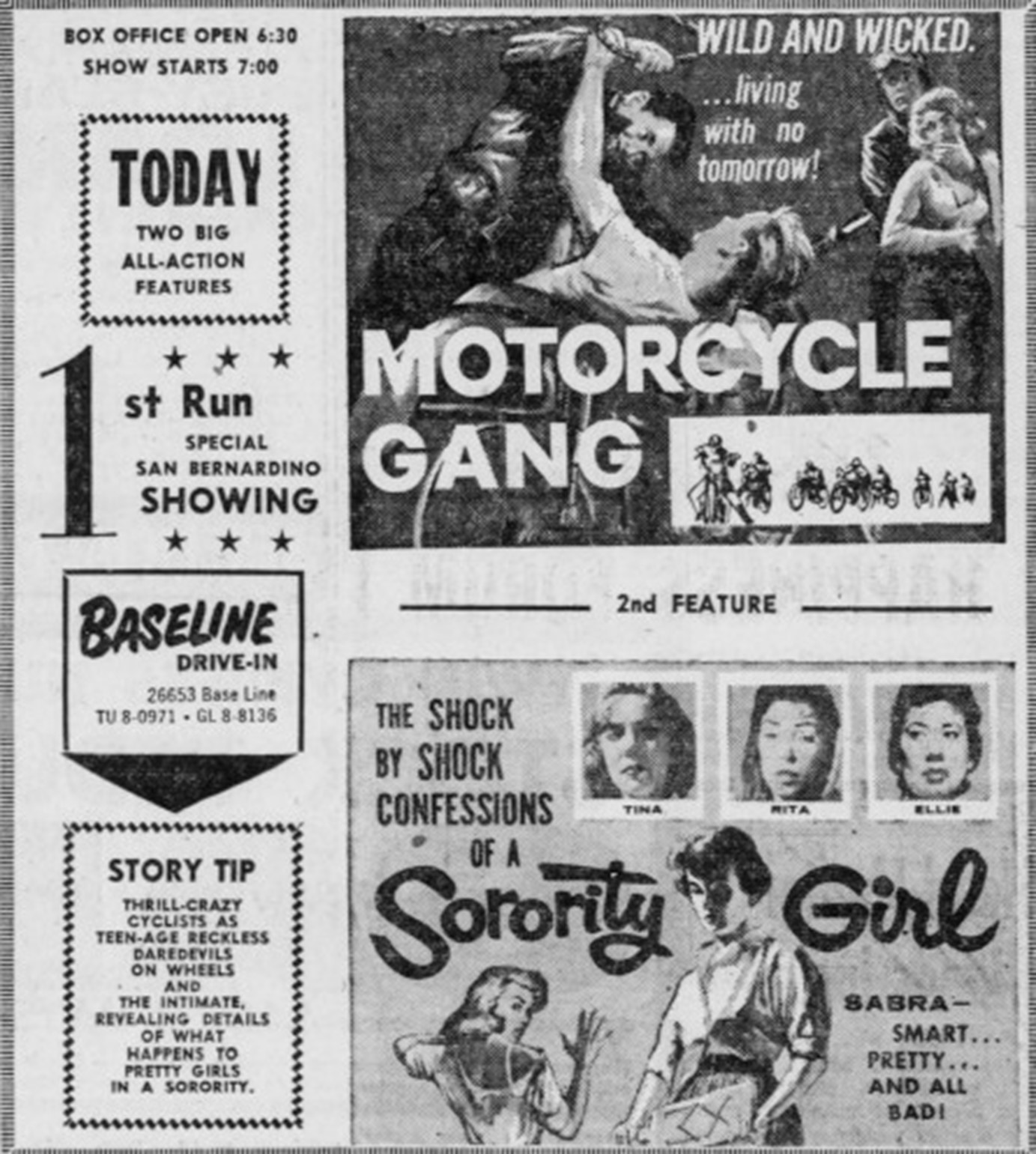
Drive-in advertisement from 1957 for Sorority Girl and co-feature, Motorcycle Gang.

Corman stated that the script was developed by AIP. He did not like it and had some of it rewritten, although not as much as he wanted.

Filming started on July 15, 1957 at Ziv Studios. Some scenes took place at the mansion of Ruta Lee in Laurel Canyon.

Susan Cabot later recalled working on Corman's films:

We would have some sort of a script, but there was a lot of, "Who's going to say what?" and "How 'bout I do this?" — plenty of ad-libbing and improvising. But Roger was really great in a way; he was very loose. If something didn't work out, he changed it right away. He gave me a great amount of freedom, and also a chance to play parts that Universal would never have given me — oddball, wacko parts, like the very disturbed girl in Sorority Girl. I had a chance to do moments and scenes that I didn't get before.

Corman later recounted filming an emotional scene with Cabot, first via a medium shot, then via a close-up, and that her performance in the scene wasn't as strong using the latter. This prompted him to learn more about acting, so he enrolled in acting classes given by Jeff Corey, where he met Jack Nicholson and Robert Towne.

== Release ==
Sorority Girl was issued on a double bill with Motorcycle Gang. The Christian Science Monitor said the film was a "sad hodgepodge of a story".

== See also ==
- List of American films of 1957
