= Son of Ali Baba =

1952 film by Kurt Neumann

- 1952 lobby card
- Directed by: Kurt Neumann
- Screenplay by: Gerald Drayson Adams
- Story by: Gerald Drayson Adams
- Produced by: Leonard Goldstein
- Starring: Tony Curtis; Piper Laurie
- Narrated by: Jeff Chandler
- Cinematography: Maury Gertsman
- Edited by: Virgil W. Vogel
- Color process: Technicolor
- Production company: Universal Pictures
- Distributed by: Universal Pictures
- Release date: August 15, 1952 (New York City)
- Running time: 75 minutes
- Country: United States
- Language: English
- Box office: $1.25 million (US rentals)

Son of Ali Baba is a 1952 American adventure film directed by Kurt Neumann and starring Tony Curtis and Piper Laurie. According to the film's trailer, it was made in response to thousands of letters in response to The Prince Who Was a Thief wanting to see Curtis and Laurie together again.

== Plot ==
In medieval Persia, Kashma Baba is a military cadet by day, and a roisterer by night. The morning after a rowdy banquet, Kiki, an escaped slave, takes shelter under Kashma's roof. Word comes that the wicked Caliph is looking for her; but Kashma, by this time in love, flees with her to his father's palace. Alas, there's more to Kiki than meets the eye. Will the evil schemers succeed? The sons of the Forty Thieves to the rescue!

== Cast ==
- Tony Curtis as Kashma Baba
- Piper Laurie as Princess Azura of Fez / Kiki
- Susan Cabot as Tala
- William Reynolds as Mustapha
- Hugh O'Brian as Hussein
- Victor Jory as Caliph
- Gerald Mohr as Capt. Youssef
- Robert Barrat as Commandant
- Leon Belasco as Babu
- Morris Ankrum as Ali Baba
