= Carnival Rock =

1957 film

- Directed by: Roger Corman
- Written by: Leo Lieberman
- Based on: TV play Carnival at Midnight by Lieberman
- Produced by: Roger Corman
- Starring: Susan Cabot; Brian G. Hutton; David J. Stewart; Dick Miller; Ed Nelson
- Production company: Howco Productions
- Distributed by: Howco International
- Release date: August 1957
- Running time: 75 min.
- Country: United States
- Language: English

Carnival Rock is a 1957 film directed by Roger Corman with musical performances by the Platters, David Houston, Bob Luman and his Shadows, and the Blockbusters.

== Plot ==
A nightclub owner, Christopher "Christy" Cristakos, falls in love with the club's singer, Natalie Cook, but the singer is in love with Stanley, a local businessman/gangster. After the gangster wins control of the club, Cristakos, the previous owner, begins to perform comic routines between the acts at the night club as part of his plan to win Natalie back. Eventually, the gangster marries the singer, which causes the previous owner to leave alone.

== Cast ==
- Brian Hutton as Stanley
- Susan Cabot as Natalie
- David J. Stewart as Christopher 'Christy' Cristakos
- Dick Miller as Ben
- Jonathan Haze as Max
- Ed Nelson as Cannon
- Chris Alcaide as Slug

== Original TV play ==
The film was based on a one-hour TV play written by Leo Lieberman, called Carnival at Midnight. It was an episode of Climax! and aired on 3 January 1957. Jack Smight directed.

=== Original cast ===
- Buddy Ebsen as Ben
- Peter Graves as Stanley
- Oskar Homolka as Christy Christakos
- Debra Paget as Natalie

== Production ==
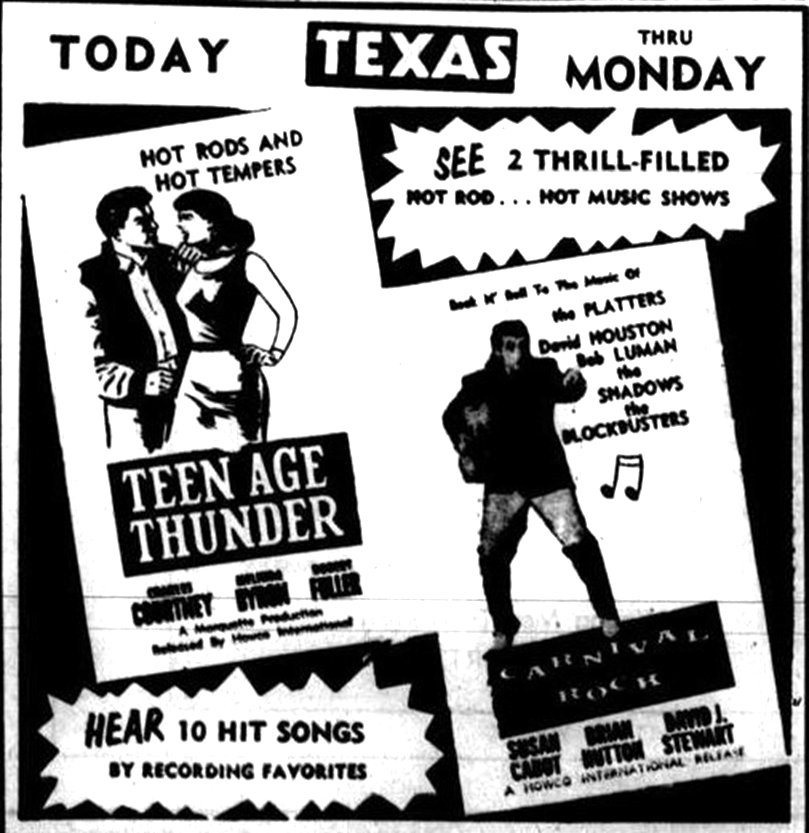
Advertisement from 1957 for Carnival Rock and co-feature, Teenage Thunder.

Roger Corman had previously made Rock All Night (1956), an earlier low budget film based on a TV play which featured musical acts. It was successful relative to its budget and Corman made this similar film for a syndicate of theatre owners.

Filming started in May 1957 at Ziv Studios. Susan Cabot was borrowed from Universal, whom she was under contract to at the time.

Music in the film was from the Platters, David Houston, Bob Luman, the Shadows, and the Blockbusters, most of whom appear in the movie as themselves.

== Songs ==
- The Platters and the Blockbusters – "Remember When"
- David Houston – "One and Only", "Teenage Frankie and Johnny"
- Susan Cabot and the Blockbusters – "Ou Shoo Bla De" and "There's No Place Without You"
- Bob Luman and the Shadows – "This Is the Night", "All Night Long"
- The Blockbusters – "Rock a Boogie"
- The Shadows – "The Creep"

== Reception ==
Variety found that Miller and Cabot turned in good performances, stated Corman did a fair job as producer and a better job as director, and found the movie had overtones of Pagliacci mixed with rock and roll.

Frank found the included music in the film the high point of the movie.

Cabot went on to make a number of films for Corman.
