= The Saga of the Viking Women and Their Voyage to the Waters of the Great Sea Serpent =

1958 film by Roger Corman

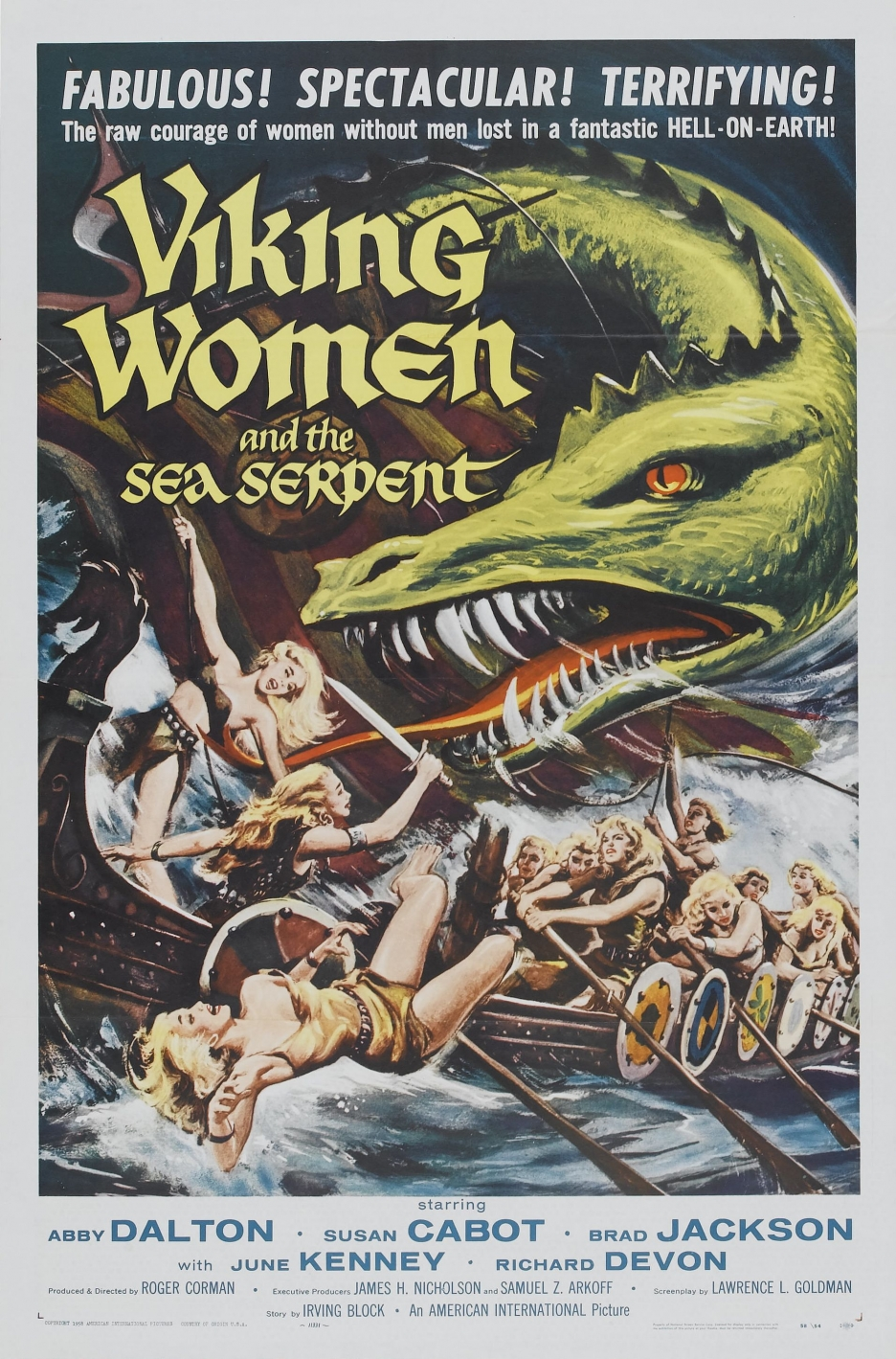
- Theatrical release poster by Reynold Brown
- Directed by: Roger Corman
- Written by: Lawrence L. Goldman
- Story by: Irving Block
- Produced by: Roger Corman (executive); James H. Nicholson; Samuel Z. Arkoff
- Starring: Abby Dalton; Susan Cabot; Richard Devon; Jonathan Haze; Gary Conway; Mike Forrest
- Cinematography: Monroe P. Askins
- Edited by: Ronald Sinclair
- Music by: Albert Glasser
- Production company: Malibu Productions
- Distributed by: American International Pictures
- Release date: January 26, 1958
- Running time: 66 minutes
- Country: United States
- Language: English
- Budget: $65,000 (estimated)

The Saga of the Viking Women and Their Voyage to the Waters of the Great Sea Serpent (also known as The Viking Women and the Sea Serpent) is a 1958 American action-adventure horror film directed by Roger Corman. It stars Abby Dalton, Susan Cabot, Richard Devon, Jonathan Haze, Gary Conway, Mike Forrest and June Kenney. It was released on January 26, 1958 on a double bill with The Astounding She-Monster (1958)

== Plot ==
A group of Viking women from Stannjold, led by Desir (Abby Dalton), decide to go out to sea in search of their missing men. They soon encounter a giant dragon-like sea serpent which destroys their ship. They wash up ashore on the mysterious land of the Grimaults and are taken captive by its ruthless tyrant Stark (Richard Devon). The Viking women discover their men, led by Vedric (Brad Jackson), had earlier washed ashore and were now imprisoned by Stark to work in his mines. The women eventually escape, liberate their men, and escape to the seashore. The Vikings paddle out in a longboat pursued by Stark and his men. Vedric manages to spear the sea serpent which sails past them and destroy the Grimault ship before succumbing to his wounds. The Vikings return to Stannjold and freedom.

== Cast ==
- Abby Dalton as Desir
- Susan Cabot as Enger
- Brad Jackson as Vedric
- June Kenney as Asmild
- Richard Devon as Stark
- Betsy Jones-Moreland as Thyra
- Jonathan Haze as Ottar
- Jay Sayer as Senya
- Lynn Bernay as Dagda
- Sally Todd as Sanda
- Gary Conway as Jarl
- Mike Forrest as Zarko
- Wilda Taylor as Grimolt Dancer

== Production ==
=== Development ===
Corman says he was approached to make the film by special effects experts Irving Block and Jack Rabin, who had acquired a script by Louis Goldman. Block and Rabin made a presentation about the effects which Corman called "breathtaking. Their pictures were beautiful, absolutely wonderful." Corman felt the "script was not especially great" but was persuaded to do it by Block and Rabin's promise to work for a small fee in exchange for a cut of the profits. Corman was reluctant to put his own money into the film. He went to AIP, who agreed to finance $70,000 to $80,000, although Corman said the presentation was more suited for a $2 million picture.

Corman was reportedly inspired to make the film by the production of The Vikings (1958). He felt if he made the movie fast enough he could have it in cinemas before that movie and take advantage of publicity for the bigger budgeted film.

In June 1957, Corman announced he would make the film for $300,000, triple of what he was used to. He said $50,000 of the budget would be assigned to special effects by Block and Rabin; Corman would normally spend $2,000 on effects. Another article that month said the effects would cost $210,000 and the movie would be Corman's twentieth and most expensive film to date. Rabin and Block had done effects on Rocketship X-M, Kronos and Invisible Boy and filming would start in August, with release through AIP.

=== Casting ===
It was the first of five movies Jay Sayer made for Corman. He was 24 but his part was written for a 15 year old. It was going to be played by an actor called Robin but he was unavailable. Sayer went to the costumer "and I literally grabbed every piece of junky jewelry they had there, which is why in the movie I'm wearing a tiara and bracelets and you name it. That diaper, that was the only thing I had to put around my bottom...that fur vest...the tacky, awful shoes, etc."

Brad Jackson was given the male lead. The female leads were Susan Cabot, Kipp Hamilton and Abby Dalton. It was Cabot's third film with Corman after Carnival Rock and Sorority Girl.

=== Shooting ===
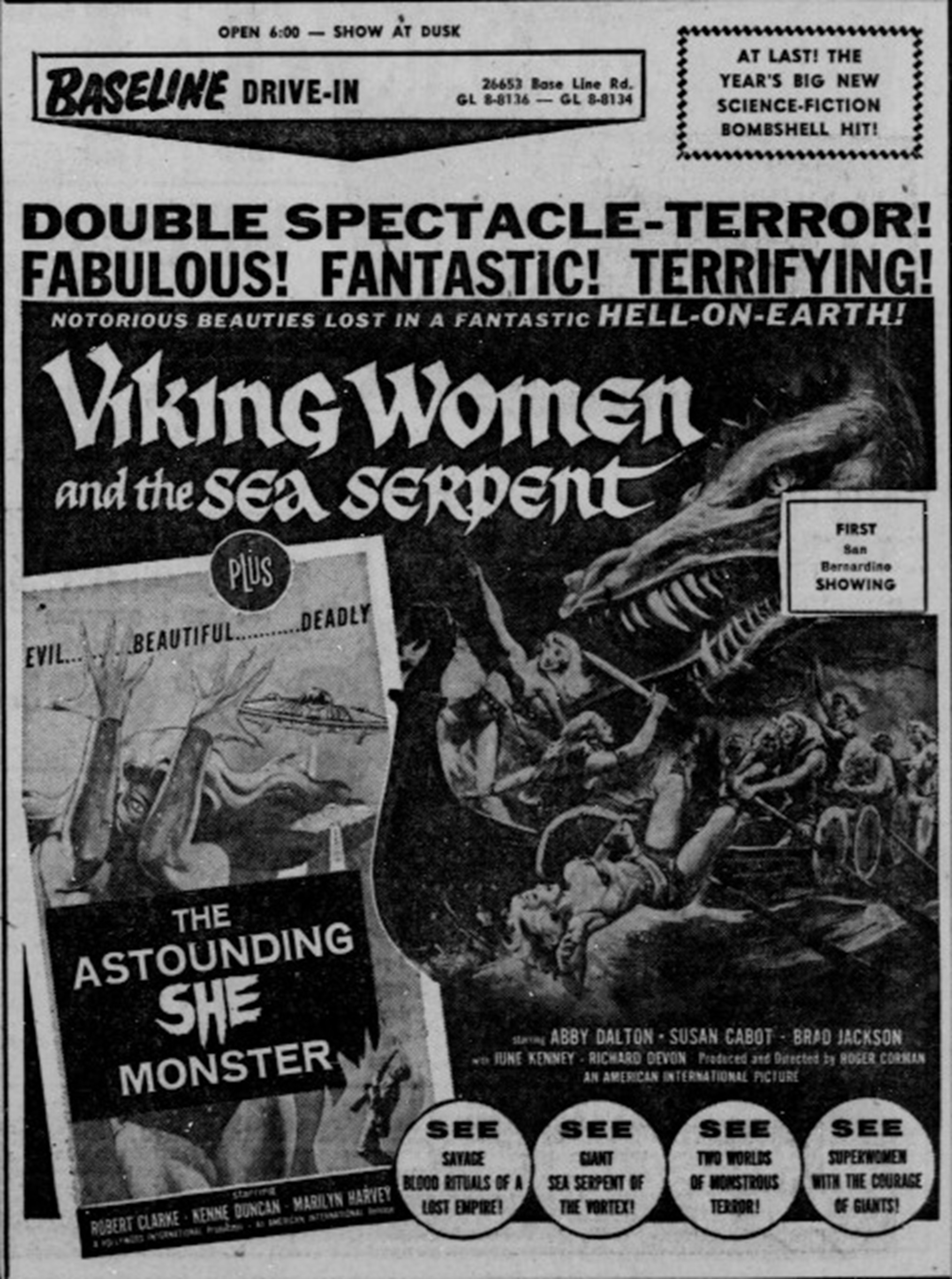
Drive-in advertisement from 1958 for Viking Women and co-feature, The Astounding She-Monster

Filming started August 19 at Ziv Studios under the title Viking Women. It also took place at Cabrillo Beach, Bronson's Canyon and Iverson's Ranch. The shooting schedule was ten days which Corman wrote in his memoirs was far too short considering the nature of the story. At Iverson's Ranch Corman made seventy seven set ups a day, his record. "It turned into an insanely difficult shoot," he wrote.

On the first day of location work at Paradise Cove, the actress Corman had cast for the lead, Kipp Hamilton, held out for more money, so he fired her and promoted second lead Abby Dalton instead. Dalton's sister Shirley Wasden took Dalton's old role.

According to Sayer filming was extremely hazardous due to the low budget and scenes involving boats and horses. Shirley Wasden injured herself falling off a horse and was replaced by June Kenny, although Wasden can be glimpsed on some scenes. Richard Devon also hurt his knee and almost drowned in the water. Susan Cabot recalled almost drowning, and says she and Abby Dalton once nearly rode horses off a cliff.

Sayer says he based his performance on Jay Robinson in The Robe.

Devon called it "a disastrous film to work on. It was as if Roger was really trying to shorten his skimpy shooting schedules even more than before. He didn't waste a frame. Nor did he spare anyone's feelings on the set. He was an absolute demon."

It was the first film Michael Forest made for Corman. He met the director in an acting class and was cast. Forest said Corman

was a bit cavalier in the way he would do things and allow the actors to take the chances that they did. But I must also say this: Roger was right there. I mean, if he asked you to climb up something and you said, "Where do you want us to climb?" he would climb up and show you — "This is what I want you to do." It wasn't as if he was saying, "Go out there and battle that tiger, I'll just stand back here and watch you do it" — you know what I mean? He was good about that. But he didn't really protect the actors that much from getting hurt, not in the early days, anyway.

Corman said by the time he came to shoot the effects "I realised I had been had." While he felt Block and Rabin were honest "they had simply promised something they could not deliver. A great sales pitch had distorted my judgement and AIPs." He said as a result of this he no longer accepted oral proposals from people, he insisted it be written. Corman said he learned "an important lesson from this movie: don't fall for a sophisticated sales job about elaborate special effects."

== Title ==
Corman later said "The full title is The Saga of the Viking Women and Their Voyage to the Waters of the Great Sea Serpent. We couldn't figure out a way to put the title in two or three words, so I said let's go to the other extreme and give them the longest title they've ever seen and then use the greatest cliché in historical pictures at the time which is to open up on an engraved leather book, a hand comes in, opens the cover of the book, and there's the title of the picture."

== Release ==
The Saga of the Viking Women and Their Voyage to the Waters of the Great Sea Serpent was released in theaters on January 26, 1958 by American International Pictures as a double feature with The Astounding She-Monster. (Bill Warren states the release date of the double feature as April 10, 1958.)

The film was released on DVD by Lionsgate Home Entertainment on April 18, 2006, as part of a two-disc set, with Teenage Caveman as the first disc.

== Reception ==
Dan Lester of Electric Sheep magazine wrote in his review: "This is a cheap looking film even by Roger Corman's standards. There is only one proper set, the Grimalts' dining hall (probably left over from another film), with most of the action taking place in featureless outdoor such as woods and beaches". Film critic Glenn Erickson wrote that although the cast was "gung-ho and athletic [...] the whole exercise plays like a high school effort," and that "[t]he laughable script is one howlingly bad line reading after another."

TV Guide called it "one of the strangest films to emerge from the fertile imagination of Roger Corman".

== In popular culture ==
The Saga of the Viking Women and Their Voyage to the Waters of the Great Sea Serpent was later featured in an episode of Mystery Science Theater 3000.

== Racial representation and historical distortion ==
The film "The Saga of the Viking Women and Their Voyage to the Waters of the Great Sea Serpent" is noted for its racial insensitivity and historical distortion. It utilizes "brownface"—white actors in dark makeup—to portray the Grimaults as a primitive and cruel tribe. Crucially, the film presents a profound historical irony: while it depicts the Vikings as innocent victims captured by "savages," historical reality shows that the Vikings themselves were the aggressive raiders who famously terrorized coastal populations and took captives into slavery. By reversing these roles, the film reinforces colonial-era tropes that associate whiteness with civilization and darker skin with inherent brutality.

== See also ==
- List of American films of 1958

== Notes ==
- Corman, Roger; Jerome, Jim (1998). How I made a hundred movies in Hollywood and never lost a dime. Da Capo Press. ISBN 9780306808746.
- Weaver, Tom (2004). "The Saga of a Corman Stock Player". Cult Movies. No. 41. p. 52–59.
- Weaver, Tom; Brunas, John (1988). "I Survived Roger Corman". Fangoria. No. 76. p. 14–19.

=== Sources ===
- Harty, Kevin J. (2006). The Reel Middle Ages: American, Western and Eastern European, Middle Eastern and Asian Films About Medieval Europe (2nd ed.). New York City: McFarland & Company. p. 272. ISBN 978-0786426577.
- McGee, Mark Thomas (1995). Faster and Furiouser: The Revised and Fattened Fable of American International Pictures. New York City: McFarland & Company. pp. 127–129. ISBN 978-0786401376.
- Ebert, Roger (2002). Roger Ebert's Movie Yearbook (2003 ed.). Kansas City, Missouri: Andrews McMeel Publishing. p. 730. ISBN 978-0740726910.
- Roberts, Jerry (2010). The Complete History of American Film Criticism. Solana Beach, California: Santa Monica Press. p. 304. ISBN 978-1595800497.
