= Creature from the Haunted Sea =

1961 film by Roger Corman

- Theatrical release poster
- Directed by: Roger Corman
- Written by: Charles B. Griffith
- Produced by: Roger Corman; Charles Hannawalt
- Starring: Antony Carbone; Betsy Jones-Moreland
- Narrated by: Robert Towne
- Cinematography: Jacques R. Marquette
- Edited by: Angela Scellars
- Music by: Fred Katz
- Distributed by: Filmgroup
- Release date: June 1961
- Running time: 60 minutes
- Country: United States
- Language: English

Creature from the Haunted Sea is a 1961 horror comedy movie directed by Roger Corman. Written by Charles B. Griffith, the movie is a parody of spy, gangster, and monster movies (mostly Creature from the Black Lagoon), concerning a secret agent, XK150 (played by Robert Towne credited as Edward Wain), who uses the name "Sparks Moran" in order to infiltrate a criminal gang commanded by Renzo Capetto (Antony Carbone), who is trying to transport an exiled Cuban general with an entourage and a large portion of the Cuban treasury out of Cuba. Filmgroup released the movie as a double feature with Devil's Partner.

== Plot ==
A colorized version of the original cut of Creature from the Haunted Sea

During the Cuban Revolution, deported American gambler and racketeer Renzo Capetto devises a get-rich-quick scheme and uses his yacht to help a group of loyalists commanded by General Tostada to escape with part of Cuba's national treasury, which they plan to use to stage a counter-revolution.

American secret agent XK150, using the alias Sparks Moran, has infiltrated the gang. The gang consists of Capeto's brazenly felonious blonde girlfriend Mary-Belle Monahan; her deceptively clean-cut younger brother Happy Jack; and a gullible, good-natured, and homicidal oaf named Pete Peterson Jr., who does frequent animal impressions.

Unfortunately, despite his other role as the story's omniscient narrator, Sparks fails to realize what is happening because of his own incompetence and infatuation with the completely uninterested Mary-Belle, who regards his attempts to rescue her from a life of crime with amused contempt.

Capetto plans to steal the gold fortune and then to claim that the mythical "Creature from the Haunted Sea" rose and devoured the loyalists, but it is he and his crew who murder one of the Cuban soldiers with sharpened, claw-like gardening tools and leave behind fake "footprints" made with a toilet plunger and a mixture of olive oil and green ink. However, he does not know that there really is a shaggy, pop-eyed sea monster lurking in the very waters where he plans to do the deed.

When the monster's insatiable hunger interferes with his scheme, Capetto decides to sink his boat into 30 feet of water off the shore of a small island and then to retrieve the gold later. Complications ensue when two of the men of his gang get involved romantically with native women, with Pete developing a relationship with Porcina and Jack with her pretty daughter Mango, and local prostitute Carmelita becoming fond of Sparks.

Capetto and his gang go scuba diving to attempt to salvage the loot and kill some of the Cubans while doing so, but the creature kills everyone, including Mary-Belle, Porcina and Mango—except for Sparks and Carmelita. The movie ends with the creature sitting on the undersea treasure and picking its teeth. The creature burps and the bubbles roll up with the credits.

== Cast ==
- Antony Carbone as Renzo Capetto
- Betsy Jones-Moreland as Mary-Belle Monahan
- Robert Towne (credited as ’Edward Wain’) as Sparks Moran / Agent XK150 / Narrator
- Beach Dickerson as Pete Peterson Jr.
- Robert Bean as Happy Jack Monahan
- Esther Sandoval as Porcina Perez
- Sonia Noemí González as Mango Perez
- Edmundo Rivera Álvarez as General Tostada
- Terry Nevin as Colonel Cabeza Grande
- Blanquita Romero as Carmelita Rodriguez
- Jaclyn Hellman as Agent XK-120

== Background ==
It was the last of an unofficial trilogy of black comedies by Griffith and Corman which also included A Bucket of Blood (1959) and The Little Shop of Horrors (1960). Corman later said "the surprise to me was there were three of these low-budget comedy-horror films... that were all so audacious; I mean, it’s so wild to do films that cheaply and on that short a schedule and with such insane subject matter. It seemed to me I would have either a great success or a colossal failure. It was disappointing that they were all modest successes. And it didn’t figure that I could do something so wild and get a little conservative return on the money and the end would be so routine."

In 1982 Corman said "Hardly anyone has ever seen this movie or even knows that it exists" but the movie has developed a minor cult reputation.

== Production ==
=== Development ===
In 1959, after the completion of The Little Shop of Horrors, Roger Corman assembled a small cast and crew and arrived in Puerto Rico to direct Last Woman on Earth and produce a World War II movie titled Battle of Blood Island. According to Corman, "I had discovered that tax incentives were available if you 'manufactured' in Puerto Rico. That included making movies." When Corman still had unused film remaining from The Last Woman on Earth, he decided to make another movie. Part of the budget came from funds he had not spent on a movie named The Wild Ride.

Corman telephoned Charles B. Griffith, who was Corman's main screenwriter, and "told him I wanted to make a comedy-horror movie while I was in Puerto Rico. He had six days to come up with the script. I told him how many actors I had and explained that I couldn't fly any additional cast members in because I just didn't have the budget for it." Corman agreed with Griffith's suggestion that Corman play one of the roles himself.

Griffith wrote a script using the same structure as two earlier Corman pictures he had done, Naked Paradise and Beast from the Haunted Cave, and would use again for another Corman movie, Atlas. "Everything was the same," said Griffith, "The crooks were waiting to get away in an airplane, the gangster’s moll falls for the rented hero and there’s the speech about security; everything was the same. "

He felt he was not being paid enough for the job and decided to punish Corman by writing him a part of Happy Jack Monahan, the most difficult role he could think of, requiring the character to be laughing hysterically in one scene and crying like a baby in the next. "This fellow was a tropical Hamlet," recalls Corman, " crying one moment, laughing the next, going from killer to victim—the works. Brando would have had trouble with this role." Corman "realized Happy Jack practically became the lead. I know Chuck did this to drive me crazy. It was too big a role, and required an actor." Corman gave the role to Robert Bean, an actor who wanted to feature in a Corman movie. Corman told Bean that if he could pay his own way to Puerto Rico, he could be part of the crew and play a role in one of the movies. Bean was boom operator for the second Puerto Rico movie and appeared in Creature; he also played the role of the Creature. Griffith was paid $1,500 for his script.

Corman claims "Chuck had sent us the script on a Thursday. I read it Thursday night, rewrote sections of it between takes on the set Friday, had it duplicated Friday afternoon, passed it out and rehearsed it Friday, Saturday and Sunday, prepared it on the location on Sunday, and started shooting on Monday."

In his memoir, Corman said:

It's been suggested that Creature from the Haunted Sea is my most personal film. That's actually not a bad suggestion, considering it's got my favorite ending of them all — a last scene I invented on a whim and literally phoned to Chuck Griffith from Puerto Rico. This was the story about a band of Batista's generals making off with a treasure chest of gold from Cuba. The man they hire to captain their boat is a mobster. He murders the generals and covers up the crimes by inventing a story about an undersea monster who devours people. But there is an undersea monster. "We have always killed off our monsters with fire, electricity, floods, whatever," I told Chuck. "This time, the monster wins. The final shot in this picture," I insisted, "is the monster sitting on the chest of gold at the bottom of the ocean floor. The skeletons of all the people in the picture are scattered around him and he's picking his teeth. That's it. The monster wins."

=== Shooting ===
Creature from the Haunted Sea was filmed in five days. Locals appeared in the movie as extras, reportedly being paid $1 an hour. According to Corman, "I was trying to get more movement into long dialogue scenes. Chuck had one scene in the script that especially bothered me because I couldn't figure out how to give it some action. We were shooting in a palm grove, and I had these Americans playing touch football with a coconut[...]If nothing else, there was a lot of movement in that scene."

During a scene in which the character Renzo Capetto is shown assembling an automatic pistol, actor Antony Carbone was given a real gun which fell apart unexpectedly. After shooting a take that "worked perfectly", Corman decided that the first take was funnier, and used it for the movie with added narration to achieve humorous effect.

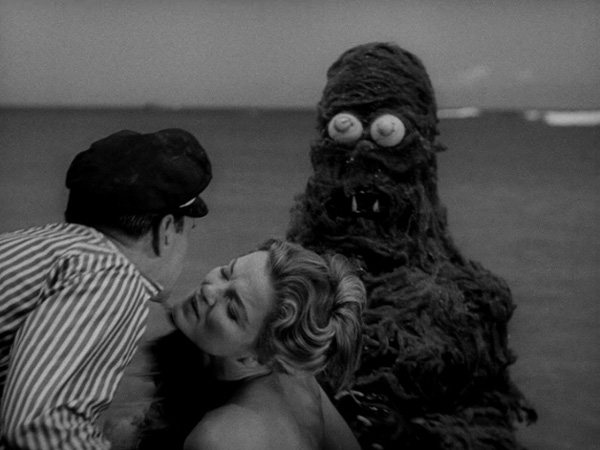
Renzo Capetto and Mary-Belle Monahan kiss as the Creature rises behind them.

According to Beach Dickerson, the creature was made from "a wetsuit, some moss, lots of Brillo pads[...]tennis balls for the eyes, ping-pong balls for the pupils, and pipecleaners for the claws. Then we cover him with black oilcloth to make him slimy." According to Carbone, the cast "really had to do some deep concentration in order not to laugh when we saw it".

Carbone felt that Corman should have filmed the scenes featuring the creature from its point-of-view, so that the audience would never see the creature. "That would at least keep a semblance of some fear. Because when you see this creature, you gotta laugh! Not that the laughter isn't good, but the laughter should not be about the creature, it should be about the actions of the creature. For example, when the creature kills, you should take the action from the actor to make it funny—his eyes pop out, or he puts his finger in his mouth like a child, or some humorous little bit that the person being killed could do. Therefore you sustain both the secrecy of this thing and bring out the comedy. Then I think it would have been at least plausible, in a way." Despite Carbone's feelings about Corman's moviemaking, he stated that the movie was "very funny" and he "had a lot of fun doing it".

When the cast and crew had difficulty getting out of the country, the cinematographer hid the movie from Corman until the cast and crew got paid for the production. Actress Betsy Jones-Moreland stated of the production that "the only problem with that movie is that it started out to be a takeoff on everything Roger had ever done before. It was to be a comedy, a laugh a minute. Then all of a sudden, somewhere in the middle of it, that got lost and it got to be serious." Moreland continued to state that she "just assumed that nobody would ever see it. In the beginning, because it was going to be a 'sophisticated' spoof and it was going to be an inside joke, I was not ashamed of it. Later, when it didn't turn out to be that way, when it got off the track and got dumb, then I wished that I'd never heard of it."

Robert Towne later said "I didn’t really see myself as an actor. And that movie confirmed my suspicions. It underlined that I most definitely did not have a career as an actor."

=== Post Production ===
The movie's musical score, written by Fred Katz, was originally written for A Bucket of Blood. According to Mark Thomas McGee, author of Roger Corman: The Best of the Cheap Acts, each time Katz was asked to write music for Corman, Katz sold the same score as if it were new music.

== Release ==
Creature from the Haunted Sea was released in 1961, often paired with another Filmgroup title Devil's Partner (1961) The theatrical running time was 60 minutes. The movie's marketing campaign did not advertise it as a comedy, and instead promoted it as a serious thriller film. The movie's poster asks "What was the unspeakable secret of the sea of lost ships?" and requests that audiences "do not give away the answer to the secret". Many audiences found the advertising to be misleading, which harmed the movie's success.

Corman said "The film had a mild success. I couldn’t believe you could do such insane stuff on film and get a little tiny profit. As I’ve said, it should have been a big success or a big failure. I stopped at that point. I'd done three of these. It was time to move on and do other things."

=== Additional footage ===
The extended cut of Creature from the Haunted Sea

In March 1963, Corman reassembled the cast in Santa Monica to appear in new scenes directed by Monte Hellman for television showings of the movie, expanding the length to 74 minutes. A title song, sung by Betsy Jones-Moreland, was added by Hellman on the assumption that a movie named Creature from the Haunted Sea should have a title song. Hellman also filmed footage for television versions of Beast From Haunted Cave, Ski-Troop Attack, and The Last Woman On Earth. According to Hellman, "That was probably the most fun I've ever had because I was the producer, writer, and director, and I had absolute control over the crew and how the money was spent and everything. It was really fantastic, plus the fact that it was totally off the wall stuff—it was like Saturday Night Fever."

== Reception and legacy ==
Dave Sindelar on his website Fantastic Movie Musings and Ramblings criticized the movie's script as being "an unfocused mess" due to its poor structure and pacing. Sindelar also criticized the poor design of the monster. TV Guide awarded the movie two out of four stars, terming the movie "entertaining". Dennis Schwartz from Ozus' World Movie Reviews gave the movie a grade D, terming it "rotten", panning the movie's "juvenile" comedy, and monster design.

== See also ==
- List of American films of 1961
- List of films in the public domain in the United States
- The Haunted Sea, a 1997 Corman production
