= The Filmgroup =

Film production company (1959–1968)

- Type: Private
- Predecessor: Palo Alto Productions
- Founded: 1959; 67 years ago
- Founder: Roger Corman; Gene Corman
- Defunct: 1968; 58 years ago
- Fate: Dissolved
- Successor: New World Pictures
- Headquarters: United States
- Products: Motion pictures

The Filmgroup was an American film production and distribution company founded by Roger and Gene Corman in 1959. Roger Corman used it to make and distribute his own movies, as opposed to ones he was making for American International Pictures. (The reason is that AIP required films to be shot using union crews; working on his own, Corman could save money by going non-union.) The company ultimately folded in 1968, however, lessons from running the company helped Corman make a success later of New World Pictures. Filmgroup also produced early feature work of Francis Ford Coppola, Peter Bogdanovich, Charles B. Griffith, Curtis Harrington, Jack Hill, Monte Hellman, Robert Towne and Jack Nicholson.

== History ==
Corman established his own company, Palo Alto Productions, in 1954, which was responsible for his first two movies. Filmgroup came out of a desire for Corman to move into distribution.

In February 1959, Filmgroup announced they would release ten films. Their first movies were High School Big Shot (1959) and T-Bird Gang (1959) produced by Stanley Bickman. Corman would also buy films made by independent distributors, in addition to several films from the Soviet Union, which he would re-dub and have additional scenes shot and added to.

Gene Corman left the company in 1963 to join 20th Century-Fox and Corman handed over distribution of his films to American International Pictures. The company soon wound up.

Because Roger Corman often neglected to copyright his movies, most of these films are in the public domain.

== Filmography ==
- High School Big Shot (1959) – directed by Joel Rapp
- T-Bird Gang (1959) – directed by Richard Harbinger
- Beast from Haunted Cave (1959) – written by Charles B. Griffith, produced by Gene Corman, directed by Monte Hellman
- The Wasp Woman (1959) – directed by Roger Corman
- The Girl in Lovers Lane (1960) – directed by Charles R. Rondeau
- Battle of Blood Island (1960) – directed by Joel Rapp. First film adaption of a book by Philip Roth.
- Ski Troop Attack (1960) – written by Charles B. Griffith, directed by Roger Corman
- The Wild Ride (1960) – starring Jack Nicholson
- Last Woman on Earth (1960) – written by Robert Towne, directed by Roger Corman
- The Little Shop of Horrors (1960) – written by Charles B. Griffith, directed by Roger Corman
- Date Bait (1960) – directed by O'Dale Ireland
- High School Caesar (1960) – starring John Ashley
- Atlas (1961) – written by Charles B. Griffith, directed by Roger Corman
- Creature from the Haunted Sea (1961) – written by Charles B. Griffith, directed by Roger Corman
- Devil's Partner (1961) – a pick up, originally made in 1958
- Pirate of the Black Hawk (1961) – directed by Sergio Grieco
- The Magic Voyage of Sinbad (1962) – acquired from the Soviet company Mosfilm
- The Intruder (1962) – produced by Gene Corman, directed by Roger Corman
- Mermaids of Tiburon (1962) – acquired from Pacific Productions
- Battle Beyond the Sun (1962) – US sequences directed by Francis Ford Coppola
- Night Tide (1963) – directed by Curtis Harrington
- The Terror (1963) – directed by Roger Corman
- Dementia 13 (1963) – directed by Francis Ford Coppola
- Voyage to the Prehistoric Planet (1965) – US sequences directed by Curtis Harrington
- Queen of Blood (1966) – directed by Curtis Harrington
- Voyage to the Planet of Prehistoric Women (1968) – US sequences directed by Peter Bogdanovich

=== Unmade projects ===
The following films were among those which Corman announced would be produced by Filmgroup but which were never made:

- Cop Killer and Sob Sisters Don't Cry – based on original scripts by Malden Harms
- Wedding Night – from script by Robert Roark
- I Flew a Spy Plane Over Russia – based on a script by Robert Towne
- Murder at the Convention – a political mystery satire from a script by Arthur Sandys starring Dick Miller and Jonathan Haze
- Pan and the Satyrs
- The Man Who Sold the Earth (1962)
- Women in War (1962)
- Haunted Dream (1962)
- Juliet (1962)
- The Story of Robert E. Lee by Robert Adams
- Fun and Profit by Joel Rapp and Sam Locke
- The Wild Surfers by John Lamb
