= James Dean (1976 film) =

- Written by: William Bast
- Directed by: Robert Butler
- Starring: Stephen McHattie; Michael Brandon; Brooke Adams; Julian Burton; Candy Clark; Amy Irving; Katherine Helmond; Meg Foster; Dane Clark; Jayne Meadows; Heather Menzies
- Music by: Billy Goldenberg
- Country of origin: United States
- Original language: English

Original release
- Release: 1976

James Dean (also known as James Dean: Portrait of a Friend) is a 1976 NBC television film about actor James Dean and starring Stephen McHattie in the title role.

The role of screenwriter William Bast, Dean's best friend, is played by Michael Brandon. This portrayal is based on the 1956 biography by Bast, which recounts the early acting career and rise of Dean. The film paints a clear picture of James Dean's pursuit for authenticity, depth and artistic meaning. Bast claimed that Dean's inspiration as an actor was inspired by what he learned from Antoine de Saint-Exupéry's 1943 novella The Little Prince.

The 1976 made-for-TV movie James Dean (also known as James Dean: Portrait of a Friend) includes scenes that depict a gay story, as it portrays James Dean through the eyes of his friend and roommate, William Bast. The film includes a scene where Dean encourages Bast to be more sexually adventurous, leading Bast to go to a gay bar,

== Cast ==
- Stephen McHattie as James Dean
- Michael Brandon as William Bast
- Brooke Adams as Beverly
- Julian Burton as Ray
- Candy Clark as Chris White
- Dane Clark as James Whitmore
- Meg Foster as Dizzy Shelton
- Katherine Helmond as Claire Folger
- Amy Irving as Norma Jean
- Jayne Meadows as Reva Randall
- Heather Menzies-Urich as Jan (credited as Heather Menzies)
- James O'Connell as Mr. Robbins
- Leland Palmer as Arlene
- Jack Murdock as Judge
- Christine White as Secretary (credited as Chris White)
- Robert Foxworth as Psychologist (uncredited)
- Bob Harks as The Bartender (uncredited)
