= Edge of Fury =

1958 film

- Theatrical release poster
- Directed by: Robert J. Gurney Jr. Irving Lerner
- Screenplay by: Robert J. Gurney Jr.
- Story by: Ted Berkman; Raphael Blau
- Based on: Wisteria Cottage by Robert M. Coates
- Produced by: Robert J. Gurney Jr.
- Starring: Michael Higgins; Lois Holmes; Jean Allison; Doris Fesette; Malcolm Lee Beggs
- Cinematography: Jack Couffer; Conrad Hall; Marvin R. Weinstein
- Edited by: Sidney Meyers
- Music by: Robert Sydney
- Production company: Wisteria Productions
- Distributed by: United Artists
- Release date: May 1958
- Running time: 78 minutes
- Country: United States
- Language: English

Edge of Fury is a 1958 American drama film directed by Robert J. Gurney Jr. and Irving Lerner and written by Robert J. Gurney Jr., based on the novel Wisteria Cottage by Robert M. Coates. The film stars Michael Higgins, Lois Holmes, Jean Allison, Doris Fesette and Malcolm Lee Beggs. The film was released in May 1958, by United Artists.

The film was summarized in TV Guide as "sick low-budget grossness about a psychopathic young beachcomber, Higgins, who pretends to befriend a mother and two daughters living at their summer home. He talks the family into letting him rent the adjacent guest cottage, then he slaughters the whole family."

== Plot ==
The film begins with a voice over by a psychiatrist discussing his patient: a young war veteran and struggling artist, Richard Barrie, who had asked to be confined but said that "society acts only after a crime has been committed." The opening scene shows Richard painting on the beach as police officers approach to arrest him.

In flashback, a beachcombing Richard comes across a beach cottage for rent. He reserves it on behalf of three women he refers to as "family", Florence Hackett and her two daughters, Eleanor and Louisa. The four met in a grocery store and Florence was struck by his manners and clean-cut charm. Eleanor develops a crush on Richard, who is instead drawn to the stand-offish, sexy Louisa, who has a steady boyfriend. Richard's co-worker at the local bookstore works knows that he is a disturbed individual who isolates himself; she feels he is too focused on the Hacketts and encourages him to take his doctor's advice to make some new friends.

At the cottage, Richard sets himself up to stay each weekend in a shed on the property, after Louisa complains about him using the guest room she wants kept free for her boyfriend when he comes for visits. For the first few weekends, in spite of the women - in Richard's view - being messy, things are pleasant; he feels he is shaping a home for the four of them. He becomes jealous and agitated, though, when Louisa and her boyfriend openly express their attraction for each other. She also often taunts Richard and makes him feel like he is a "nobody".

During a walk on the beach, Eleanor kisses Richard, who reacts violently before explaining that he thinks of her as platonic family. Louisa invites an acquaintance out as a date for Eleanor, suggesting that Richard may see that he is letting someone good slip by him. Richard throws a dinner party in his shed, which is not a complete success. Later, he sees Eleanor and her date embrace and kiss on the beach, and reacts by trashing the rooms in the cottage. Eleanor tells him she understands he acted out of jealousy, but that she does not care for the man. She makes a gentle, amorous move toward Richard and he physically abuses her.

Louisa confronts Richard for taking advantage of her sister; he calls her a "tramp" and accuses the women of setting him up all along. Florence demands that Richard apologize or leave. His paranoia and psychosis out of control, he leaves the shed but not the cottage. He mutilates the portrait he painted of Florence and leaves it for her and Eleanor to find. Frightened, Florence phones Louisa, who has had to return to the city; she tells her mother to get a neighbor boy to stay overnight with them. Though she was planning to go back to the cottage likely the next day, a worried Louisa and her boyfriend drive back right away.

When the neighbor boy arrives, Richard stabs and kills him, then murders Florence. Louisa and her boyfriend arrive just as Eleanor runs from the cottage. As Louisa goes to comfort her sister, the boyfriend enters the house to find that Richard has fled, leaving behind Florence's dead body. The final scene returns to the beginning where Richard is peacefully painting on the beach as the police arrive to take him away.

== Cast ==
- Michael Higgins as Richard Barrie
- Lois Holmes as Florence Hackett
- Jean Allison as Eleanor Hackett
- Doris Fesette as Louisa Hackett
- Malcolm Lee Beggs
- Craig Kelly
- John Harvey
- Beatrice Furdeaux
- Mary Boylan

== Production ==
Edge of Fury was one of Conrad Hall's first films as a principal cinematographer. In 2003, he was included in a listing of history's ten most influential cinematographers by the International Cinematographers Guild.
