= Last Woman on Earth =

1960 American science-fiction film directed by Roger Corman

The Last Woman on Earth
- Theatrical release poster
- Directed by: Roger Corman
- Screenplay by: Robert Towne
- Produced by: Roger Corman; Charles Hannawalt
- Starring: Betsy Jones-Moreland; Antony Carbone; Robert Towne
- Cinematography: Jacques R. Marquette
- Edited by: Anthony Carras
- Music by: Ronald Stein
- Distributed by: Filmgroup
- Release date: October 1960 (United States)
- Running time: 71 minutes
- Country: United States
- Language: English

The Last Woman on Earth (also referred to as Last Woman on Earth, as The does not appear in the film's title card) is a 1960 American science fiction film that was produced and directed by Roger Corman. It tells the story of three survivors of a mysterious apocalypse, which appears to have wiped out all human life on earth.

The screenplay is by Robert Towne, who also acted in the film under the pseudonym Edward Wain. The music was composed and conducted by Ronald Stein. The film was originally released in October 1960 by Filmgroup as a double feature with The Little Shop of Horrors (1960).

== Plot ==
The full film

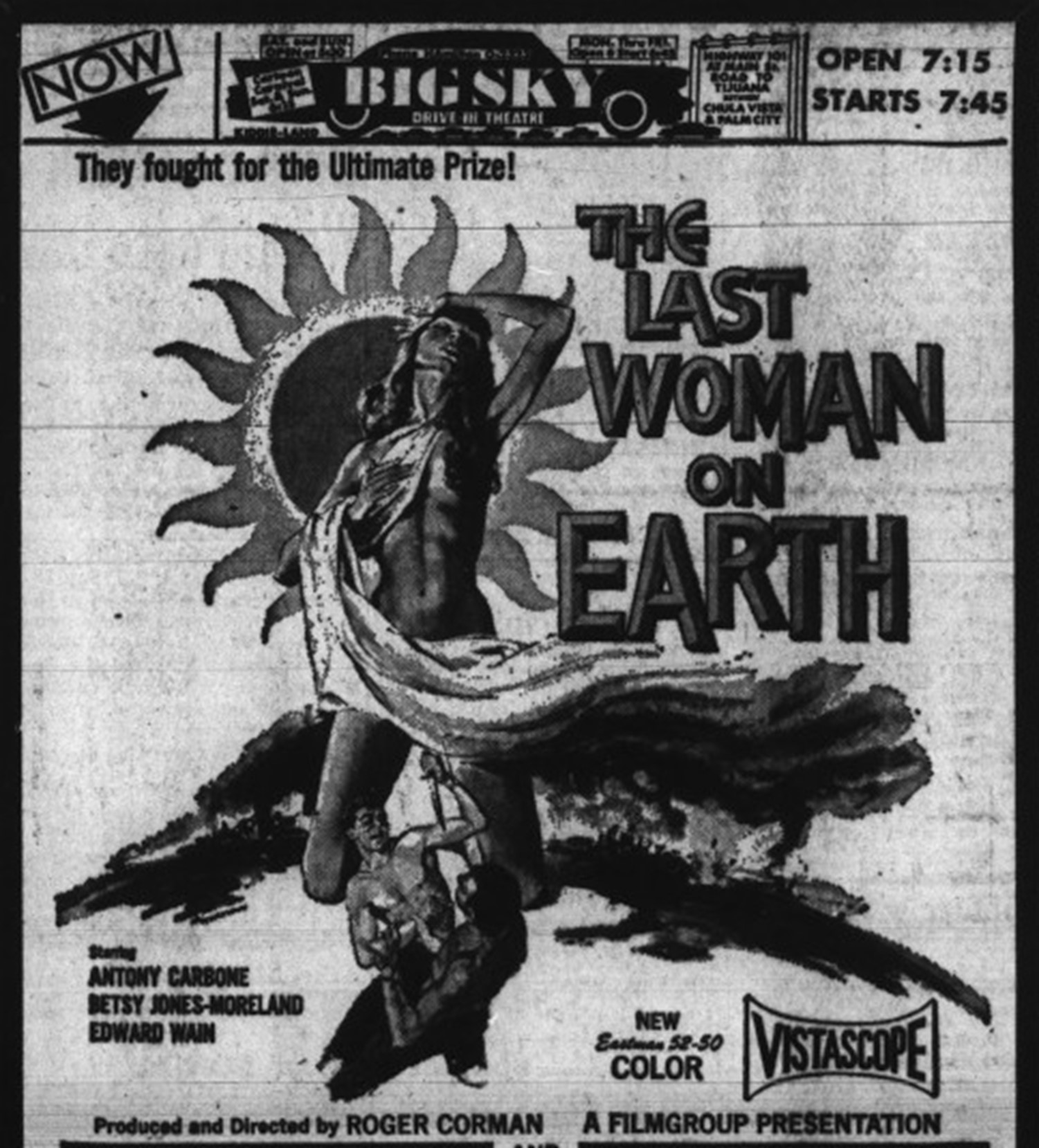
Drive-in advertisement from 1960

Harold Gern, a successful businessman from New York who constantly has legal problems, is spending a holiday in Puerto Rico with his wife, Evelyn, "between trials", as she describes it. They are joined by Martin Joyce, Harold's lawyer, who has come to discuss the latest indictment.

Harold invites him along on a boat trip during which all three try out some newly bought scuba diving equipment. When they resurface, they have difficulty breathing without using their scuba tanks. They climb back into their boat and find Manuel, the crewman, dead, apparently of asphyxiation. Upon rowing ashore, they enter the jungle to return to town. With the air in their tanks running out, they discover that the foliage gives off oxygen that they can breathe.

When they reach town, they find nobody left alive and there is no news on the radio. It dawns upon the three that they might be the only survivors in the area, maybe in the world. Harold takes charge, and they concentrate on becoming self-sufficient, with the two men fishing, as marine creatures have survived. Later, they also find living insects and baby chicks. Harold suggests that in the long run, they will have to move north to a colder climate to avoid problems with insects and food preservation and to increase their chances of meeting other survivors.

When Harold chances upon Martin and Eve kissing, he asserts ownership of Eve as her husband. Martin argues that the rules have changed. Ev tells him that she has never felt love from Harold and was treated only as a possession. Harold and Martin have a physical fight after Martin and Ev have sex, and she tells Harold she was not raped. Harold gives Martin two hours to leave the island, and warns him not to take Harold's boat. Ev wants Martin to ask her to go with him and he does, stealing the keys for the truck so that Harold cannot follow. The two leave together and Harold eventually follows in a chase to the harbour. Martin, injured in the fight with Harold, crashes the car and the two continue on foot. Harold catches up with Martin as he searches for a boat and they fight again. Harold again beats up Martin, who dies from his injuries. Harold holds out his hand to Ev and the two go together.

== Cast ==
- Betsy Jones-Moreland as Evelyn Gern
- Antony Carbone as Harold Gern
- Robert Towne as Martin Joyce

== Home media ==
The film is in the public domain, and several DVD editions exist, including one by Alpha Video. Most are copies of black and white 16 mm prints, struck for television, but a faded colour print is carried by the Internet Archive. The Retromedia release is transferred from a color-corrected 35 mm print and was released on DVD through Image Entertainment, featuring introductions by Corman, with commentary tracks by Jones-Moreland and Carbone. The release also features the other two films in Corman's "Puerto Rico Trilogy," Creature from the Haunted Sea and Battle of Blood Island, shot back to back with Last Woman.

== See also ==
- List of American films of 1960
- Five, 1951 film directed by Arch Oboler
- List of films in the public domain in the United States
- The World, the Flesh and the Devil, 1959 film directed by Ranald MacDougall
