= Jean Allison =

American actress (1929–2024)

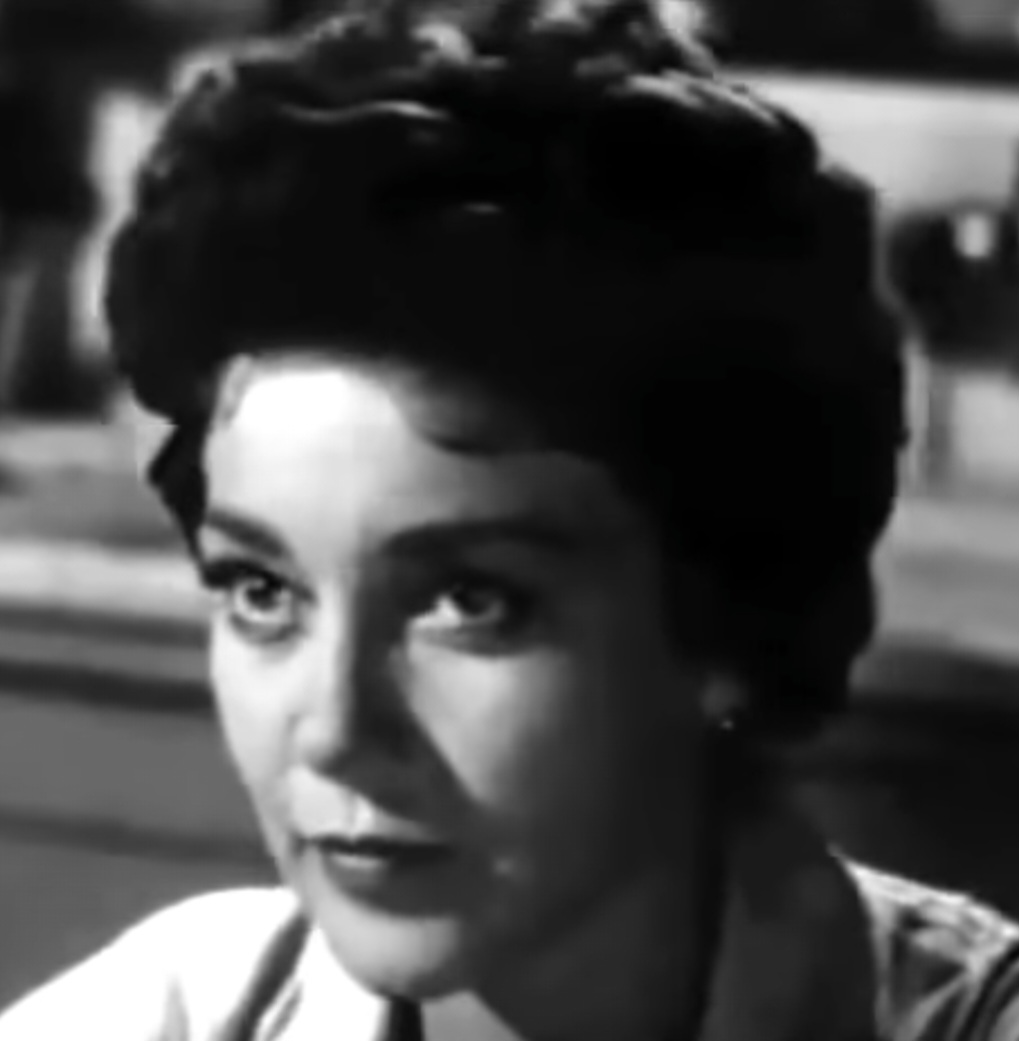
- Allison in an episode of One Step Beyond (1960)
- Born: October 24, 1929; New York City, New York, U.S.
- Died: February 28, 2024 (aged 94); Rancho Palos Verdes, California, U.S.
- Occupation: Actress
- Years active: 1957–1984
- Spouse(s): Lee Philips (divorced); Jerry Boyd (divorced); Phil Toorvald (1961-1994) (his death)
- Children: Erin; Sven; Tina

Jean Allison (October 24, 1929 – February 28, 2024) was an American actress. She appeared in numerous films and television series throughout the 1950s to the 1980s.

== Biography ==
Jean Allison was born in New York City, on October 24, 1929. She made her debut on television in the mid-1950s and was credited with a host of minor roles and appearances as guest star in dozens of episodes of television series.

Allison appeared in one episode of The Rifleman, The Whirleybirds; two episodes each of The Californians, Schlitz Playhouse of Stars, One Step Beyond, Mickey Spillane's Mike Hammer, Law of the Plainsman, The Alaskans, Hawaiian Eye, Wanted: Dead or Alive, The Detectives, Laramie, Dr. Kildare, Bonanza, Gunsmoke,Owen Marshall: Counselor at Law, Charlie's Angels; three episodes of The Sheriff of Cochise, and 77 Sunset Strip; and four episodes of Emergency!. She played Nora Borden, whose legs were broken when thrown from a horse, on "Have Gun, Will Travel" Season 1 Episode 20 "The Last Laugh" which aired on 1/24/1958. In 1959 she appeared on Wagon Train S3 E8 "The Felizia Kingdom Story" as Angela Kingdom. On Adam-12, she played a woman involved in a 415 (domestic dispute) in an episode that aired on March 7, 1973. She was on Starsky & Hutch for a double episode as Helen Yeager in 1977.

Allison also appeared in secondary roles in several films - as Eleanor Hackett in Edge of Fury, as Nell Lucas in Devil's Partner, as Florence Maguire in The Steagle, as Mrs. Dixon in Bad Company, and as Mrs. Steensma in Hardcore. In 1971 and 1974, Allison had minor roles in ABC movies of the week: first in Aaron Spelling's The Death of Me Yet, then in The Elevator. She also had a support role in the 1977 NBC made-for-television movie The Strange Possession of Mrs. Oliver.

Her last appearance on television was in 1984 on the series Highway to Heaven.

Allison died in Rancho Palos Verdes, California, on February 28, 2024, at the age of 94.

== Selected filmography ==
=== Film ===
- Edge of Fury (1958)
- Devil's Partner (1961)
- The Steagle (1971)
- Bad Company (1972)
- Hardcore (1979)

=== Television ===
- General Electric Theater (1957)
- Schlitz Playhouse of Stars (1959) Episode: Shotgun Slade-The Salted Mine
- The Californians (1958-1959)
- Mickey Spillane's Mike Hammer (1958-1959)
- Whirlybirds (1958-1959)
- Have Gun – Will Travel (1958)
- Letter to Loretta (1958)
- The Restless Gun (1958) in Episode "Jebediah Bonner"
- M Squad (1958)
- Maverick (1958)
- The Rough Riders (1958)
- Trackdown (1958)
- Wanted Dead or Alive (1959–1961) S2 E10 "Reckless" 11/6/1959 - Madge Nelson
- One Step Beyond (1959) Episode: "Twelve Hours to Live"
- Sugarfoot (1959)
- Bourbon Street Beat (1959)
- Lawman (1959) Episode: "The Posse"
- Rawhide (1959)
- Bronco (1960) Episode: "Death of an Outlaw"
- One Step Beyond (1960) Episode: "Tidalwave"
- Johnny Ringo (1960)
- Bonanza (1960) Episode: "The Avenger"
- Perry Mason (1961)
- Hennesey (1961) Episode: "Hennesey vs. Crandall"
- The Rifleman (1961)
- Bat Masterson (1961)
- Wanted Dead or Alive (1961) season 3 episode 17 (Bounty on Josh) : Carol Frazer
- The Dick Van Dyke Show (1963)
- Gunsmoke (1970–1974)
- Bewitched (1970)
- Adam-12 (1973)
- Emergency! (1976)
- The Bionic Woman (1976) Episode: "Angel of Mercy"
