= The Strange Possession of Mrs. Oliver =

1977 film

- Original newspaper advertisement
- Written by: Richard Matheson
- Directed by: Gordon Hessler
- Starring: Karen Black; George Hamilton; Robert F. Lyons; Lucille Benson; Jean Allison
- Composer: Morton Stevens
- Country of origin: United States
- Original language: English

Production
- Producer: Stanley Shpetner
- Cinematography: Frank Stanley
- Editors: Jerry Garcia; Frank Morriss
- Running time: 78 minutes
- Production company: The Shpetner Company

Original release
- Network: NBC
- Release: February 28, 1977

The Strange Possession of Mrs. Oliver is a 1977 American made-for-television horror film directed by Gordon Hessler and starring Karen Black, George Hamilton, Robert F. Lyons, Lucille Benson, and Jean Allison. The teleplay was written by Richard Matheson. The film first aired on NBC in 1977.

== Plot ==
Its plot follows a bored housewife who takes on an alternate persona that starts wreaking havoc on her life. Karen Black plays the title role, a dowdy, downtrodden housewife plagued by recurring nightmares of funerals, black flowers, fires, and a woman called Sandy. Seeking an escape from her stifling lifestyle and dull husband, who only wishes her to have a baby, Black dons a low-cut red blouse, blonde wig, garish makeup, and a new identity. She is also compelled to buy a house in a beach community where it would appear a woman who looks just like her once resided - before her tragic demise.

== Critical reception ==
According to John Stanley, "Director Gordon Hessler builds the mystery with a deft camera, creating ambiguities to intrigue us: Is Black undergoing possession, reincarnation or what? Supernatural mood blends with psychological thrills."

== Cast ==
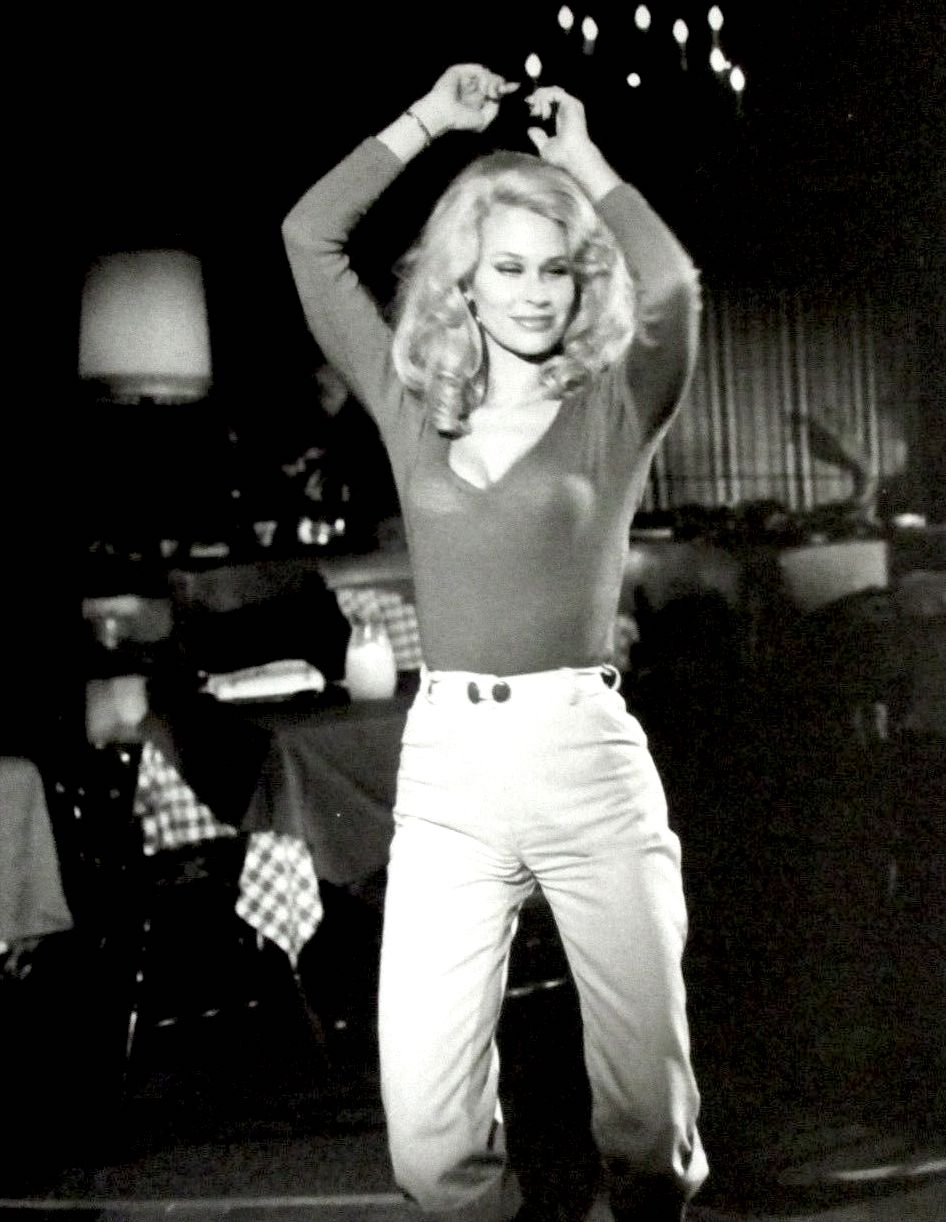
Black as the titular Mrs. Oliver.

- Karen Black as Miriam Oliver / Sandy
- George Hamilton as Greg Oliver
- Robert F. Lyons as Mark
- Lucille Benson as Housekeeper
- Jean Allison as Mrs. Dempsey
- Gloria LeRoy as Saleslady

== Critical response ==
Hal Erickson of AllMovie awarded the film four out of five stars, but noted that Hessler's direction "muddles" Matheson's "perfectly coherent script."
