= High School Big Shot =

- One-sheet for High School Big Shot
- Directed by: Joel Rapp
- Written by: Joel Rapp
- Produced by: Stanley Bickman
- Starring: Tom Pittman; Virginia Aldridge; Howard Veit; Malcolm Atterbury
- Cinematography: John M. Nickolaus Jr.
- Edited by: Carlo Lodato
- Music by: Gerald Fried
- Distributed by: Sparta Productions; Filmgroup
- Release date: June 21, 1959
- Running time: 69 minutes
- Country: United States
- Language: English

High School Big Shot is a 1959 film directed and written by Joel Rapp and starring Tom Pittman, in his final film role, as Marv Grant, a smart high school student whose plans for getting a college scholarship are threatened by his alcoholic father played by Malcolm Atterbury, and his relationship with the most popular girl in school. Filmed in 1958 under the title Blood Money, it was released by executive producer Roger Corman as a double feature with T-Bird Gang in his first Filmgroup release.

High School Big Shot was featured in an episode (#618) of the comedy series Mystery Science Theater 3000.

== Plot ==
High School Big Shot

Marv Grant (Tom Pittman) is a high school student who lives with his deadbeat, alcoholic father. At school he begins dating the attractive Betty Alexander (Virginia Aldridge), who eventually manipulates him into writing her English class term paper for her. Their teacher figures out that Betty cheated on the paper and fails her, and also withdraws his recommendation from Marv's college application, leaving him with no chance of earning a scholarship. In anger, Betty dumps Marv and returns to her old boyfriend, Vince, revealing that she had only been using Marv from the beginning.

At his part-time job at the docks, Marv overhears his boss plotting a drug deal for $1 million worth of heroin. The money will be kept in the office safe prior to the deal. In despair, Marv plots to steal the money, with the help of local safecracker Harry March and his brother-in-law Sam Tallman. Marv intends to use the money to help his father and possibly win Betty back. He tells her about the pending robbery to entice her to marry him, and she shows interest, but secretly tasks her boyfriend, Vince, to steal all the money from Marv.

Marv and his two accomplices successfully steal the money, but while attempting to escape, Vince and his gang attempt to take it from them. Sam resists and is shot by Vince, which horrifies his accomplices, who flee from the scene. Betty arrives soon afterwards, but Vince blames her for getting him into the situation, and he kills her too. The drug dealers arrive, shooting and killing Vince while he attempts to leave with the cash, which is accidentally spilled off the dock and into the water. The police arrive and shoot one of the dealers before arresting the others along with Marv.

== Cast ==
- Tom Pittman as Marv Grant
- Virginia Aldridge as Betty Alexander
- Howard Veit as Vince Rumbo
- Malcolm Atterbury as Mr. Grant
- Stanley Adams as Harry March
- Louis Quinn as Samuel Tallman
- Peter Leeds as Mr. Carter

== Production ==
The film was financed by Roger Corman, who was particularly impressed by the performance of Tom Pittman in the lead.

In February 1959, Filmgroup announced they would release ten films. Their first movies were High School Big Shot (1959) and T-Bird Gang (1959), also produced by Stanley Bickman.

== Reception and legacy ==
In 1994, the film was featured in a sixth-season episode (#618) of the movie-parody series Mystery Science Theater 3000 alongside the 1954 short film Out of This World.

The episode was available on DVD by Shout Factory on March 28, 2017; the original unriffed film was included as a special feature.

== See also ==
- List of American films of 1959
