= Julian Burton =

American film and television actor

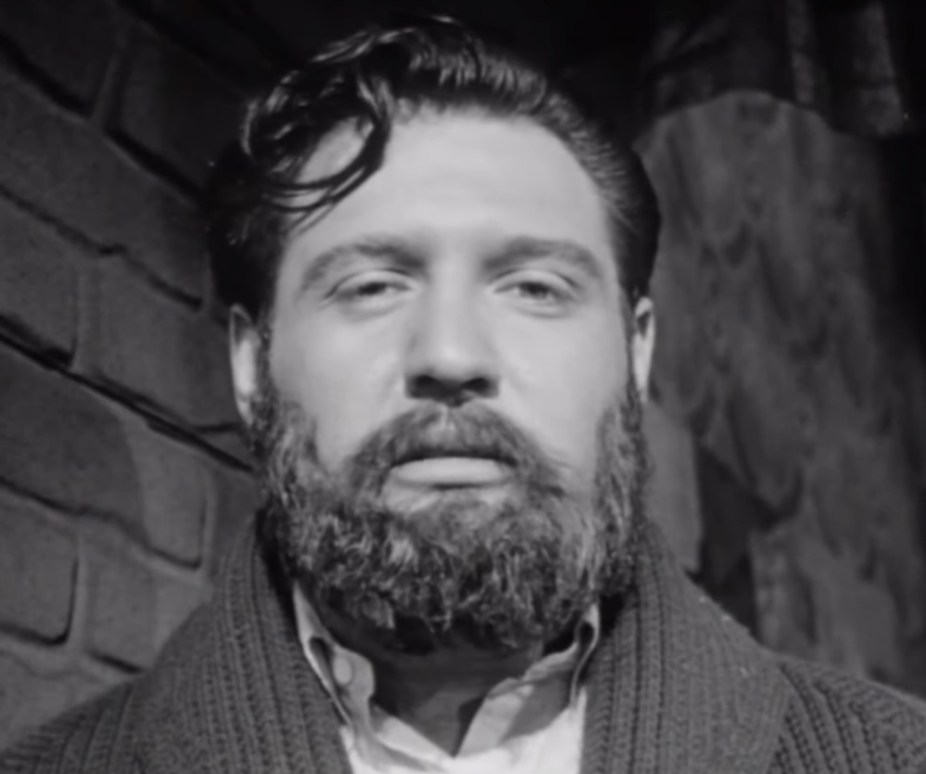
- Burton in A Bucket of Blood, 1959
- Born: Julian Edward Burton; June 24, 1932; Detroit, Michigan, U.S.
- Died: March 27, 2006 (aged 73); Palm Springs, California, U.S.
- Education: University of California, Los Angeles
- Occupations: Film and television actor

Julian Edward Burton (June 24, 1932 – March 27, 2006) was an American film and television actor. He was best known for playing poet Maxwell H. Brock in the 1959 film A Bucket of Blood.

== Life and career ==
Burton was born in Detroit, Michigan. At an early age, he moved to Los Angeles, California. He attended the University of California, Los Angeles, earning his BA degree in theatre. He began his screen career in 1956, appearing in the syndicated anthology television series Science Fiction Theatre. In 1958, he played an uncredited role in the film The Young Lions, and played Billy Corley in the film Man or Gun.

In 1959, Burton starred as poet Maxwell H. Brock in the Roger Corman film A Bucket of Blood, starring along with Dick Miller, Barboura Morris, Antony Carbone, Ed Nelson and Bert Convy. He guest-starred in television programs including Tales of Wells Fargo, Mannix, Rawhide, Mission: Impossible, Get Smart and Two Faces West. He also appeared in films such as Man in the Middle and The Masque of the Red Death.

Burton retired from acting in 1990, last appearing in the film Down the Drain.

== Death ==
Burton died on March 27, 2006, in Palm Springs, California, at the age of 73.
