= Dementia 13 =

1963 film by Francis Ford Coppola

- Theatrical release poster
- Directed by: Francis Ford Coppola
- Written by: Francis Ford Coppola
- Produced by: Roger Corman
- Starring: William Campbell; Luana Anders; Bart Patton; Mary Mitchel; Patrick Magee; Eithne Dunne
- Cinematography: Charles Hannawalt
- Edited by: Stuart O'Brien; Morton Tubor
- Music by: Ronald Stein
- Production companies: The Filmgroup; Garrick Ltd.
- Distributed by: American International Pictures (U.S.)
- Release date: September 25, 1963 (U.S.)
- Running time: 81 minutes (restored); 80 minutes (original w/ prologue); 75 minutes (w/o prologue)
- Countries: United States; Ireland
- Language: English
- Budget: $42,000

Dementia 13 (released in the United Kingdom as The Haunted and the Hunted) is a 1963 horror thriller film written and directed by Francis Ford Coppola in his feature film directorial debut, and starring William Campbell, Luana Anders, Bart Patton, Mary Mitchel, Eithne Dunne, and Patrick Magee. The film was produced by Roger Corman for his company The Filmgroup, and released in the United States by American International Pictures during the fall of 1963, as the bottom half of a double feature with Corman's X: The Man with the X-ray Eyes.

Although Coppola had been involved in at least two sexploitation films previously, Dementia 13 served as his first mainstream "legitimate" directorial effort. Corman offered Coppola the chance to direct a low-budget horror film in Ireland using funds left over from Corman's recently completed The Young Racers, on which Coppola had worked as a sound technician. The producer wanted a cheap Psycho copy, complete with gothic atmosphere and brutal killings, and Coppola quickly wrote a screenplay with Corman's requirements. Although given total directorial freedom during production, Coppola found himself at odds with Corman after completion. The producer declared it unreleasable and demanded several changes, including added scenes by directors Jack Hill and Monte Hellman.

In 2017, Coppola's company, American Zoetrope, restored the director's cut under the supervision of James T. Mockoski, with editing by Robert Schafer, sound restoration by Jim McKee of Earwax Productions, and color supervision by Chris Martin of Mission Film and Design. The film is in the public domain.

== Plot ==
A copy of the film without the prologue

While out rowing in the middle of a lake after dark, John Haloran and his young wife Louise argue about his rich mother's will. Louise is upset that everything is designated to go to charity in the name of a mysterious "Kathleen". The argument, combined with the exertion of rowing the boat, causes John to have a heart attack. He informs Louise that, should he die before his mother, Louise will receive none of the inheritance, after which he dies. Louise dumps his corpse over the boat's side, where it sinks to the bottom of the lake. Her plan is to pretend that he is still alive so that she can ingratiate her way into the will. She types up a letter to her mother-in-law, Lady Haloran, inviting herself to the family's castle in Ireland while her husband is "away on business".

At the castle, John's two brothers, Billy and Richard, take part in a bizarre ceremony with their mother, part of a yearly tribute to their deceased younger sister Kathleen, who drowned years before in a freak accident. Lady Haloran still mourns for her daughter, and during the ceremony, she faints dead away as she does every year. As Louise helps her mother-in-law into the castle, Lady Haloran tells her that she fainted because one of the fresh flowers she had thrown died as it touched Kathleen's grave.

Louise, realizing that Lady Haloran is emotionally overwrought and superstitious, devises a plan to convince the old woman that Kathleen is trying to communicate with her from beyond the grave. She steals some of Kathleen's old toys and places them at the bottom of the estate's pond, where they will float to the surface in a ghostly way during the middle of the day. She swims and sees what appears to be Kathleen's perfectly preserved corpse at the bottom of the pond. Horrified, she surfaces and is attacked with an axe by an unknown assailant. Louise's killer drags her corpse away.

Concerned family doctor Justin Caleb arrives and is determined to solve the mystery. He questions the family. The murderer decapitates a man named Simon, who has been poaching on the estate. Dr. Caleb has the pond drained, revealing a shrine with a headstone, engraved with the words "Forgive Me, Kathleen." The following night, Lady Haloran is attacked by a shadowy figure, but she eludes him and collapses in the castle's courtyard.

Dr. Caleb uses an obscure nursery rhyme ("Fishy, fishy, in a brook, Daddy caught you on a hook"), recited by Billy under hypnosis, to help him discover Louise's frozen corpse hidden away in a meat locker. Next to the bloody body is a wax figure of Kathleen. Dr. Caleb places the figure in a public square to lure out the killer. Taking the bait, a gibbering Billy, who has gone insane with guilt over inadvertently causing Kathleen's death years ago, attempts to kill Richard's fiancée Kane with an axe. Dr. Caleb saves her life by shooting Billy to death with a pistol he was carrying in his pocket.

== Cast ==
- William Campbell as Richard Haloran
- Luana Anders as Louise Haloran
- Bart Patton as Billy Haloran
- Mary Mitchel as Kane
- Patrick Magee as Dr. Justin Caleb
- Eithne Dunne as Lady Haloran
- Peter Read as John Haloran
- Bairbre Dowling as Kathleen Haloran
- Karl Schnazer as Simon
- Ron Perry as Arthur
- Derry O'Donovan as Lillian

== Production ==
=== Development ===
Francis Ford Coppola worked as a sound man on Corman's The Young Racers (1963), a racing film which starred Campbell and Magee. That film was shot in several different countries; and, after production was completed in Ireland, Corman still had $22,000 (equivalent to $231,000 in 2025) of the film's allocated $165,000 (equivalent to $1,735,000 in 2025) budget remaining. Corman originally thought of using the funds to direct a "quickie" film himself, but his schedule made this impractical. Instead, Corman suggested that Coppola remain in Ireland with a small crew and direct a low-budget horror film, to be produced by Corman. Coppola later recalled, "Roger wanted to make Dementia 13 cheaply. He wanted it to be homicidal, sort of a copy of Psycho. You know, gothic and psychological, with some kind of terrible knife-killing scene thrown in. So I wrote the script to order".

Coppola wrote a brief draft story idea in one night. The next morning, he described to Corman the most vividly detailed sequence: a half-naked woman ties several dolls to the bottom of a lake, then surfaces to find herself at the feet of an axe murder: "axed to death!", Coppola exclaimed. Corman was impressed enough to immediately provide Coppola with the $22,000 for the film. The young director was able to arrange an additional $20,000 (equivalent to $210,000 in 2025) in financing himself by pre-selling the European rights to a producer named Raymond Stross. Coppola did not inform Corman of the production's additional funding ... and quickly moved the initial $22,000 into a bank account in case an angry Corman ever attempted to reclaim his original investment.

Coppola's friend Al Locatelli served as the film's art director and helped Coppola write the final script in three days, uncredited. The speed at which the screenplay was completed resulted in unrealistic, "stilted" dialogue that Campbell recalled as being very difficult for the actors to speak.

The majority of the American actors in the cast were friends of Coppola's from UCLA, and many of them paid their own way to Ireland for the opportunity to appear in a film. Most of the Irish cast members were from the Abbey Theatre and were paid strictly minimum wage salaries. Eithne Dunne received approximately $600 (equivalent to $6,300 in 2025) for her performance. The cast and crew lived together in a farm house located outside of Dublin.

=== Casting ===
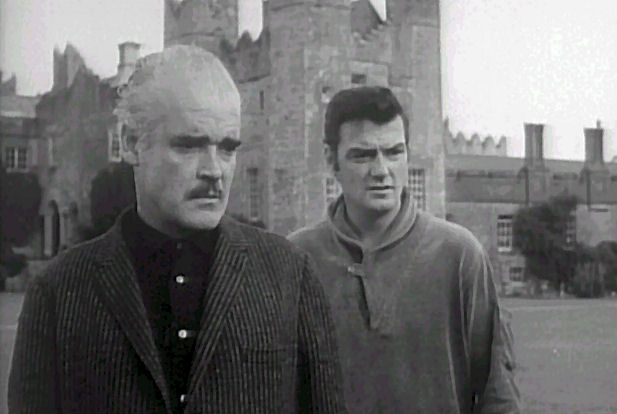
Patrick Magee as Dr. Caleb (left) and William Campbell as Richard Haloran (right).

Dementia 13 was one of several Roger Corman productions veteran B-movie character actor Campbell appeared in, but it was the first that was completed on such a small budget. Coppola had convinced Campbell (and his The Young Racers co-star Patrick Magee) to appear in the film. The actor originally felt that it would turn out to be a strictly "amateur endeavor", but he soon became impressed by Coppola's leadership abilities, talent, and energy on the set. Campbell recalled years later, "There were all kinds of promises as to what he [Coppola] would do for me later. It was one of those 'I-owe-you-one' things, but he never did anything! I tried to get to him when he was doing The Godfather, thinking that a cop or gangster part might be good for about 17 weeks, but after Dementia 13, I was never able to get through to him again!"

Anders' role as the scheming wife of a rich but prematurely dead heir to a fortune is one of the actress's most notable screen roles. Dementia 13 was one of several appearances that she made in AIP productions. Most of these films had been directed by Roger Corman, including a major role co-starring with Vincent Price in The Pit and the Pendulum (1961). Like Campbell and Patrick Magee, Anders had been borrowed by Coppola from the cast of Corman's just-completed film The Young Racers. After Dementia 13, Anders never had such a sizable role again, appearing in numerous small parts in both television and film until her death from breast cancer in 1996.

Magee's role as the family doctor who manages to solve the mystery in Dementia 13 was one of many horror film parts the Tony Award-winning actor accepted during the course of his distinguished career. He had just finished shooting Corman's The Young Racers when Coppola convinced him, along with his Racers co-stars Campbell and Anders, to appear in Coppola's debut feature. Years later, Campbell warmly remembered Magee as being a brilliant performer although a little prone to overacting.

=== Filming ===
Principal photography on Dementia 13 began on September 10, 1962 at Ardmore Studios in Bray, Ireland, under the working title "Dementia". Howth Castle, located in the Dublin suburb of Howth, depicted the fictitious "Castle Haloran" in the film.

During filming, Coppola kept Corman updated on the status of the production in letters that promised much sex and violence would appear in the film, "enough to make people sick". Coppola was left entirely on his own while directing the film, without interference of any kind from Corman. When the completed film was shown to him, Corman stormed out of the screening room and demanded that several changes be made, changes that Coppola did not agree with. According to Coppola, Corman "insisted on dubbing the picture the way he wanted it, adding voiceovers to simplify some of the scenes. Worse, he wanted extra violence added, another axe murder at least..." Jack Hill (credited as "second unit director") was later hired by Corman to shoot some brief sequences featuring actor Karl Schanzer as a comical poacher, who is beheaded by the murderer.

Corman also complained the film was too short and insisted that it be padded out with at least another five minutes of footage. Gary Kurtz, one of Corman's assistants at the time, recalled, "So we shot this stupid prologue that had nothing to do with the rest of the film. It was some guy who was supposed to be a psychiatrist, sitting in his office and giving the audience a test to see if they were mentally fit to see the picture. The film was actually released with that prologue". The prologue was directed by Monte Hellman. This cheap William Castle-style gimmick also included a "D-13 Test" handout that was given to theater patrons. It was devised by a supposed "medical expert" to weed out psychologically unfit people from viewing the film. The test consisted of such questions as, "The most effective way of settling a dispute is with one quick stroke of an axe to your adversary's head?" and "Have you ever been hospitalized in a locked mental ward, sanitarium, rest home or other facility for the treatment of mental illness?" "Yes" and "No" were the only possible answers.

== Release ==
Dementia 13 was released in the fall of 1963 as the bottom half of a double bill with Corman's X: The Man with the X-ray Eyes.

=== Home media ===
The Roan Group released the film on LaserDisc and DVD, both of which included an audio commentary by Campbell. The DVD also featured the original "D-13 Test" in digital form as an extra; the film's five-minute added prologue, which featured the test, has not been included on any of the film's numerous home video releases. Dementia 13 was released on Blu-ray April 26, 2011.

Dementia 13 was restored to a director's cut in 2017 that was released to 1080p Blu-ray Disc and Digital 4k UHD on September 21, 2021. The Blu-ray from Lionsgate/Zoetrope includes an introduction and audio commentary by Francis Ford Coppola, and "Prologue (Dementia 13 Test)".

== Reception ==
Because of its rushed production and a somewhat incomprehensible screenplay, reviews of Dementia 13 have been mixed:

The reviewer for The New York Times, "H. T.", dismissed the film, writing, "Under the stolid direction of Francis Coppola, who also wrote the script, the picture stresses gore rather than atmosphere and all but buries a fairly workable plot". Michael Weldon, in The Psychotronic Encyclopedia of Film, noted it had "[A] great trick ending, some truly shocking, gory axe murders, and lots of inventive photography". Tom Raynes, in the Time Out Film Guide, said "The location (an Irish castle) is used imaginatively; the Gothic atmosphere is suitably potent, and there's a wonderfully sharp cameo from Patrick Magee". Danny Peary, in his Guide for the Film Fanatic, stated that "despite the hopelessly confusing storyline ... the horror sequences are very exciting". Phil Hardy's The Aurum Film Encyclopedia: Horror opined, "[O]ne senses the presence of a director right from the moody opening sequence ... A piece of high gothic melodrama ... The weakness of the film is in the script, which gives every indication of having been bundled together at the last minute"... John Charles, in Video Watchdog, wrote that the film was "a remarkably confident and proficient thriller. Several of its components hint at the creativity that was still to come from Coppola ... and the finished product is a testament to his ingenuity". Kim Newman opined, "Coppola ... works fast and creative in Dementia 13... making memorable, shocking little sequences out of the killings and the implied haunting, using his locations well and highlighting unexpected eeriness like a transistor radio burbling distorted pop music as it sinks into a lake, along with a just-murdered corpse".

On the review aggregator website Rotten Tomatoes, 69% of 29 critics' reviews are positive, with an average rating of 5.7/10.

== In popular culture ==
The film's title appears on a theater marquee in the Coppola-produced film American Graffiti (1973), even though the film was set in 1962, before the theatrical release of Dementia 13.

The 1976 song "American Girl" from the debut album by Tom Petty and the Heartbreakers opens with a lyrical reference to the line in the movie when Louise Haloran says, "…especially an American Girl. You can tell she's been raised on promises."

In the HBO series, The Sopranos, Meadow goes with her first college boyfriend to see the film in a revival house in the 6th episode of Season 3 entitled “University”.

== Remake ==
A remake of the same title, directed by Richard LeMay, was released on October 6, 2017.

== See also ==
- List of American films of 1963
- List of films in the public domain in the United States
- List of Orion Pictures films
