= Tom Pittman (actor) =

American actor (1932–1958)

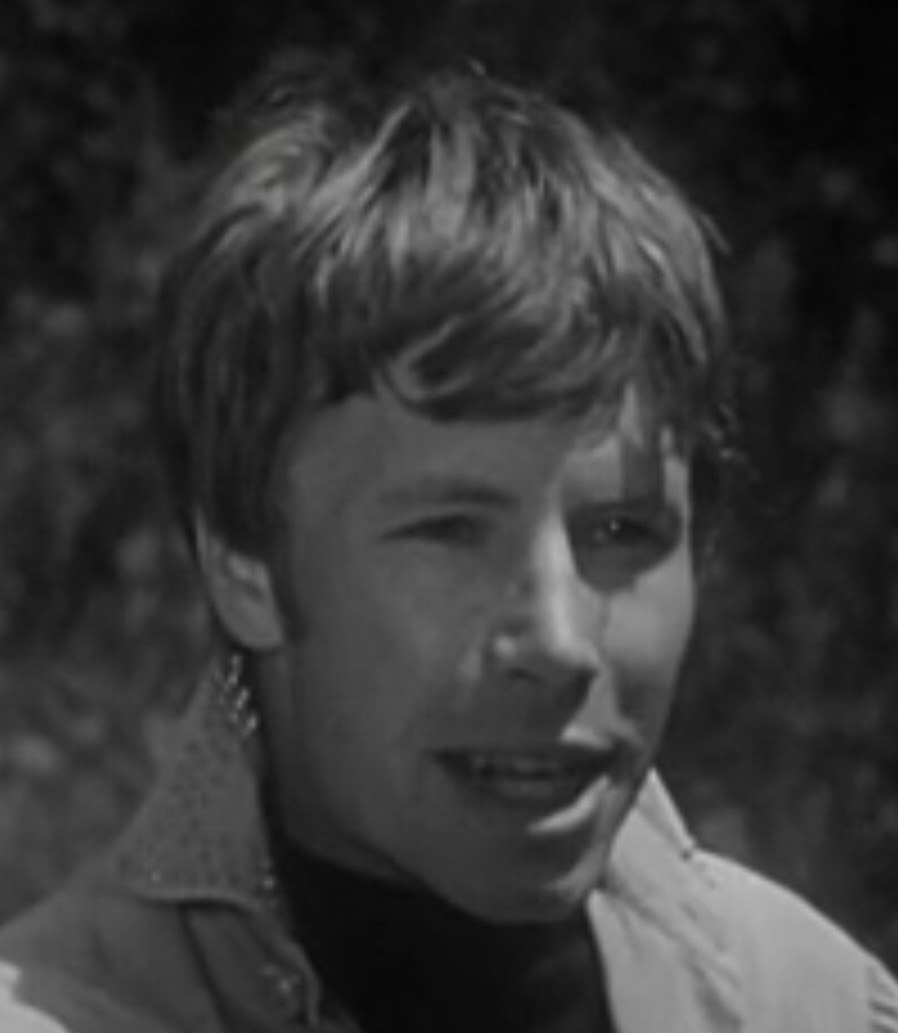
- Pittman in Man with a Camera (1958)
- Born: Jerry Lee Alten; March 16, 1932; Phoenix, Arizona, U.S.
- Died: October 31, 1958 (aged 26); Hollywood Hills, California, U.S.
- Other names: Geoff Parish; Thomas Pittman
- Occupation: Actor
- Years active: 1956-1958

Tom Pittman (March 16, 1932 – October 31, 1958) was an American film and television actor. After his death at the age of 26, the Los Angeles Times called him "one of Hollywood's most promising young actors."

== Career ==
Pittman was born Jerry Lee Alten in Phoenix, Arizona. His father was television and radio actor Frank Alten. Pittman began his career in acting in 1956 with a guest starring role on Science Fiction Theatre. He made his film debut that same year in D-Day the Sixth of June.

Pittman went on to roles in numerous television Westerns including Gunsmoke (playing “Jimmy McQueen” a young affable yet smart herder who seeks revenge on a career horse-thief in the 1956 S1E32 entitled “Dutch George” and in 1957 as “Budge Grilk”, a psychotic step-son in S3E5’s “Potato Road”), Cheyenne, Have Gun – Will Travel, The Restless Gun, and Cimarron City.

In films, Pittman appeared in the 1957 drama The Young Stranger (1957) and the musical comedy Bernardine (1957). He had a prominent supporting role in the western The Proud Rebel, playing the son of the villain (portrayed by Dean Jagger) who eventually gives up revenge. His final two roles were in the films Verboten! and High School Big Shot, both released in 1959, the year following his death.

== Death ==
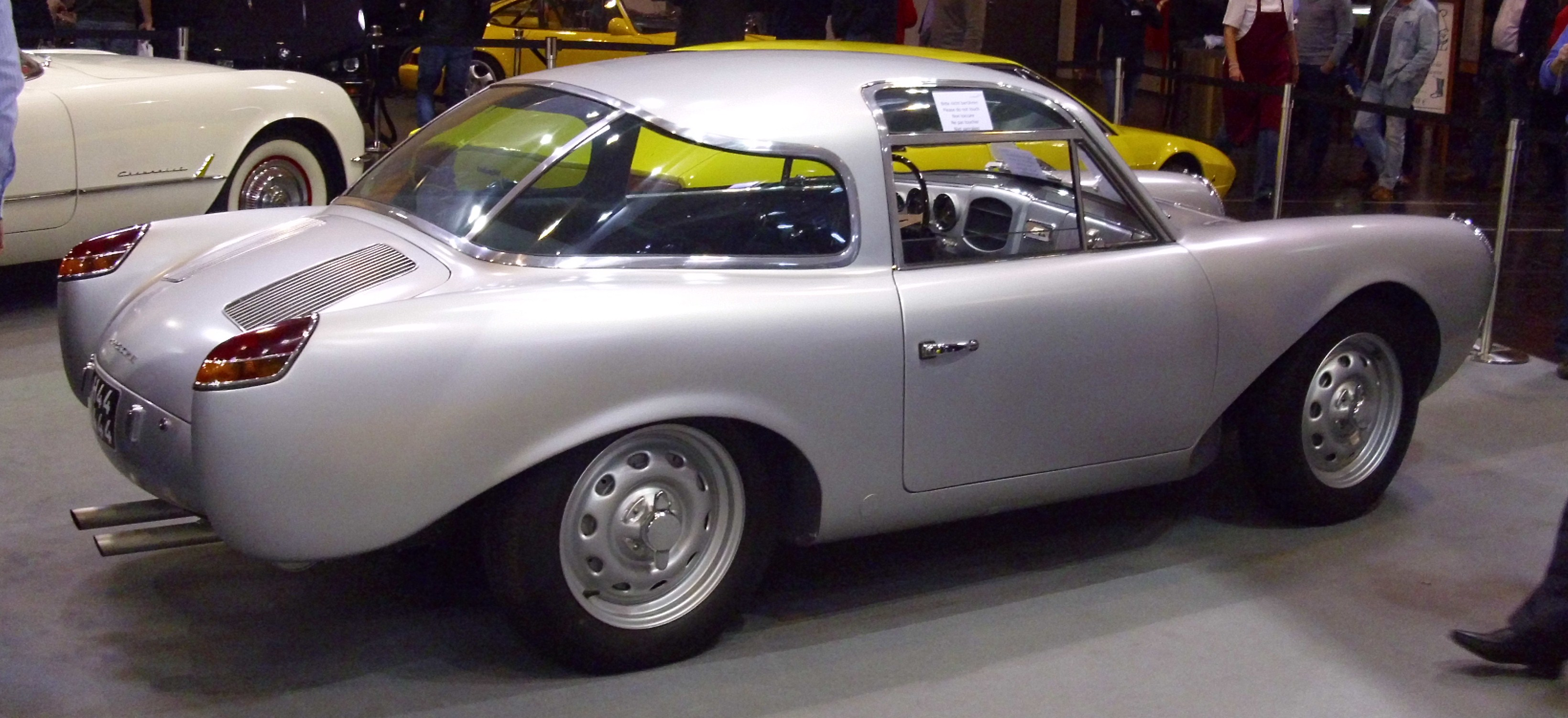
1954 Glöckler-Porsche 356 Coupé

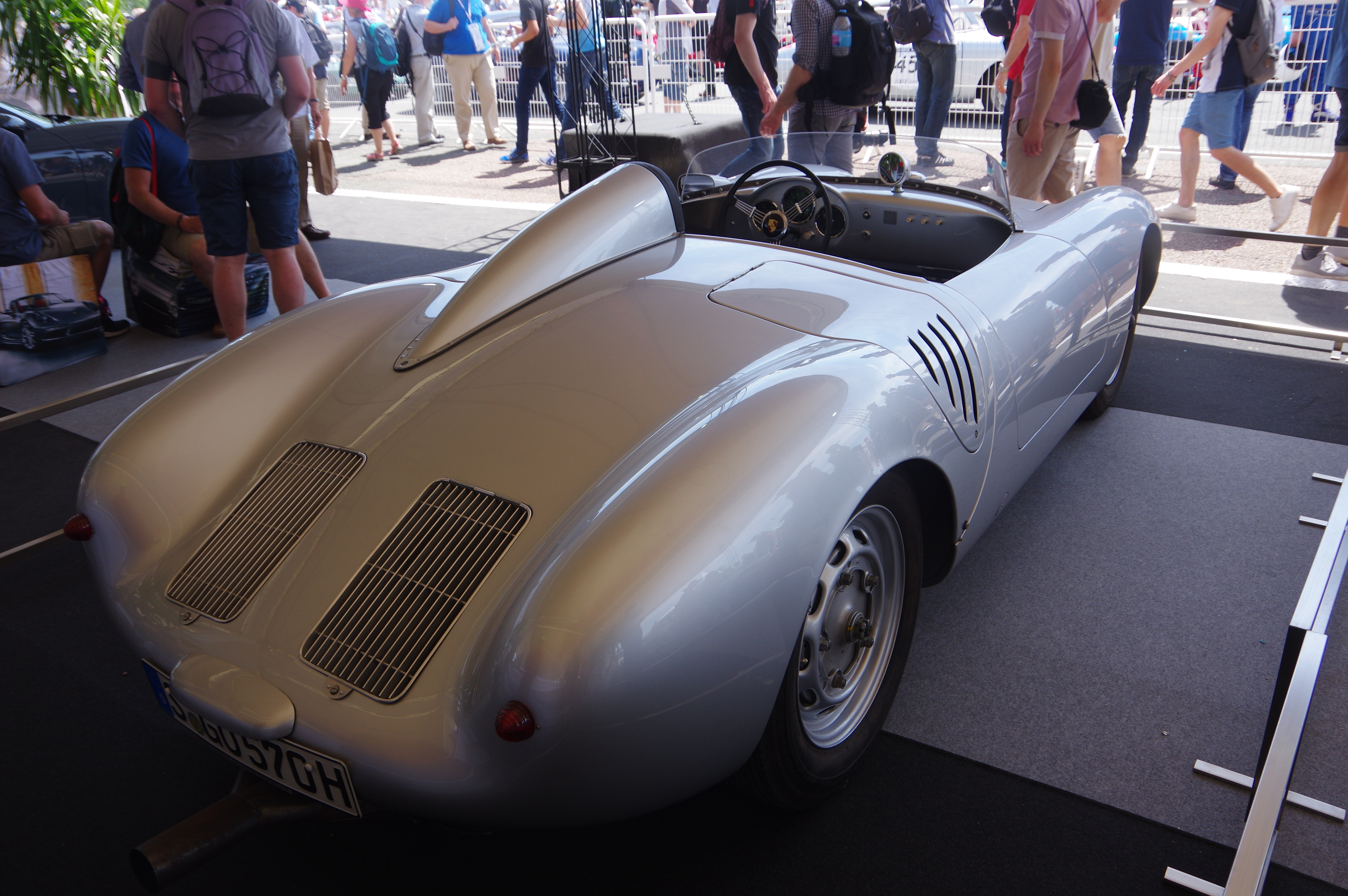
1955 Porsche 550 Spyder

In the early 1950s, Porsche dealer and racer Walter and Helm Glöckler in Frankfurt, Germany privately modified the rear-engine Porsche 356 for racing purposes, mostly with open top. By 1953, the factory decided to offer a race-ready car with similar styling, with mid-rear engine layout, the Porsche 550 Spyder. In 1955, actor James Dean crashed and died in a 550. Already in 1957 Porsche upgraded to the Porsche 718. Pittman not only had one of the few Glöckler-Porsche, but also one similar to the one that had been fitted in early 1954 with a significantly modified closed top, which did not race in the 1954 Mille Miglia, only in the Liège–Rome–Liège. The car was with Pittman in the USA in 1957, still carrying the distinctive German oval-shaped export licence plate.

On October 31, 1958, Pittman was driving home after a Halloween party when his Porsche went off the road at a sharp curve in the Hollywood Hills. After he failed to return home, his father filed a missing persons report. Weeks later, on November 19, Los Angeles police officer Roy Kerton retraced the roads Pittman's father said his son liked to drive and found the wreckage of Pittman's Porsche at the bottom of a 150-foot ravine. Pittman died after crashing through the guard rail, his car landing at the bottom of the ravine where it remained out of sight.

== Filmography ==
Film
Year	Title	Role	Notes
1956	D-Day the Sixth of June	Air Force Officer	Uncredited
1956	Between Heaven and Hell	Replacement	Uncredited
1957	The Young Stranger	Lynn Spears	
1957	The True Story of Jesse James	Hughie	Uncredited
1957	The Way to the Gold	Sid Songster, Jr.	
1957	Bernardine	George Olsen	Uncredited
1957	No Time to Be Young	Stu Bradley	
1957	Black Patch	Flytrap (Carl)	
1958	The Proud Rebel	Tom Burleigh	Credited as Thomas Pittman
1958	Apache Territory	Lonnie Foreman	Credited as Thomas Pittman
1959	Verboten!	Bruno Eckart	Released posthumously
1959	High School Big Shot	Marvin "Marv" Grant	Filmed in 1958. Released posthumously (final film role)

Television
Year	Title	Role	Notes
1956	Science Fiction Theatre	Willis	Episode: "Who Is This Man?"
1956	Climax!		Episode: "Sit Down With Death"
1956	Highway Patrol	Carjack Victim	Episode: "Taxi"
1956	Gunsmoke	Jimmy McQueen	Episode: "Dutch George"
1956	Cheyenne	Bushrod	Episode: "The Long Winter"
1956	West Point		Episode: "The Mystery of Cadet Layton"
1956	The Man Called X		Episode: "Underground"
1956	The Ford Television Theatre		Episode: "The Women Who Dared"
1957	Navy Log	Lieutenant Cal Radin	Episode: "Operation Golden Rule"
1957	Suspicion	Joe	Episode: "Four O'Clock"
1957	Dick Powell's Zane Grey Theatre	John Harris	Episode: "The Deserters"
1957	Trackdown	Tom Sladen	Episode: "The Marple Brothers"
1957	The Restless Gun	Lex Harcourt	Episode: "Revenge at Harness Creek"
1957	Gunsmoke	Budge Grilk	Episode: "Potato Road"
1957	Wagon Train	Tom "Tommy" Nichols	Episode: "The Mary Halstead Story"
1957	General Electric Theater		Episode: "The Trail to Christmas"
1958	Have Gun – Will Travel	Grady Stewart	Episode: "The Reasonable Man"; Credited as Geoff Parish
1958	Studio 57		2 episodes
1958	The Walter Winchell File	Woody	2 episodes
1958	Telephone Time	Wes Sheek	Episode: "Trail Blazer"
1958	Trackdown	Red Bolton	Episode: "The Winter Boys"
1958	Jane Wyman Presents The Fireside Theatre	Hank	Episode: "The Last Test"
1958	M Squad	Burt Kennedy	Episode: "Day of Terror"
1958	Tombstone Territory	Billy Clanton	Episode: "Pick Up the Gun"; Credited as Thomas Pittman
1958	The Restless Gun	Jason Leaf	Episode: "The Manhunters"
1958	Buckskin	Dan Pruitt	Episode: "The Ballad of Gabe Pruitt"
1958	Tales of Wells Fargo	Bill Dowd	Episode: "The Gambler"
1958	M Squad	Alvin Jessop	Episode: "Dead or Alive"
1958	Westinghouse Desilu Playhouse	Herold	Episode: "The Case of Dr. Mudd"
1958	Man with a Camera	Terry Killeen	Episode: "Profile of a Killer"
1959	Zorro	Romualdo	Episode: "The Runaways"
1959	Cimarron City	Jesse Stainback	Episode: "Child of Fear"
