= Eithne Dunne =

Irish actress (1919–1988)

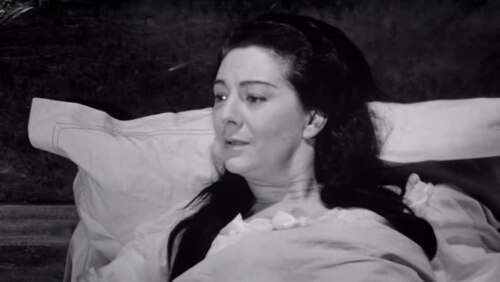
- Eithne Dunne as Lady Haloran in Dementia 13 (1963)
- Born: 30 October 1919; Belfast, Northern Ireland
- Died: 21 December 1988 (aged 69); London, England

Eithne Dunne (30 October 1919 – 21 December 1988) was an Irish stage and screen actress.

== Career ==
She was born in Belfast, Northern Ireland. She first started acting in Dublin and made her first appearances at the Abbey Theatre in 1939. She remained there for most of the 1940s. In the 1950s she performed at the Gate Theatre, after which she made her first appearance on Broadway.

In 1960 she took part in the highly successful Abbey touring production of The Playboy of the Western World. In the mid-1960s she was resident and performed in a number of plays at the Bristol Old Vic, including Henry V, Othello, All In Good Time and The Rivals.

Although primarily a stage actress, she appeared in a number of TV series and motion pictures, including Shake Hands with the Devil, Dementia 13, and others.

== Later life and death ==
In 1942, she married the actor-playwright Gerard Healy, who died on the 9 March 1963 in London. After playing in front of an enthusiastic audience in Hugh Leonard's Stephen D, her husband Healy collapsed in theatre and died. He was then buried in Mount Jerome Cemetery, Harold's Cross. In 1971, Dunne signed her last contract with the Abbey Theatre, she played the role as the Mother in Jack White's Today The Bullfinch, and in Tom Murphy's The Morning After Optimism.

Dunne died 21 December 1988, in a London Hospital aged 69. Dunne's funeral mass was celebrated in Donnybrook church, Dublin, and she was buried in Mount Jerome Cemetery, alongside her husband. Dunne is remembered for her career in acting, especially performing for many years in the Abbey Theatre, where her career began. She is remembered by many Irish and English companies, including the Radio Éireann Repertory Company, as she was a well-known member.

== Legacy ==
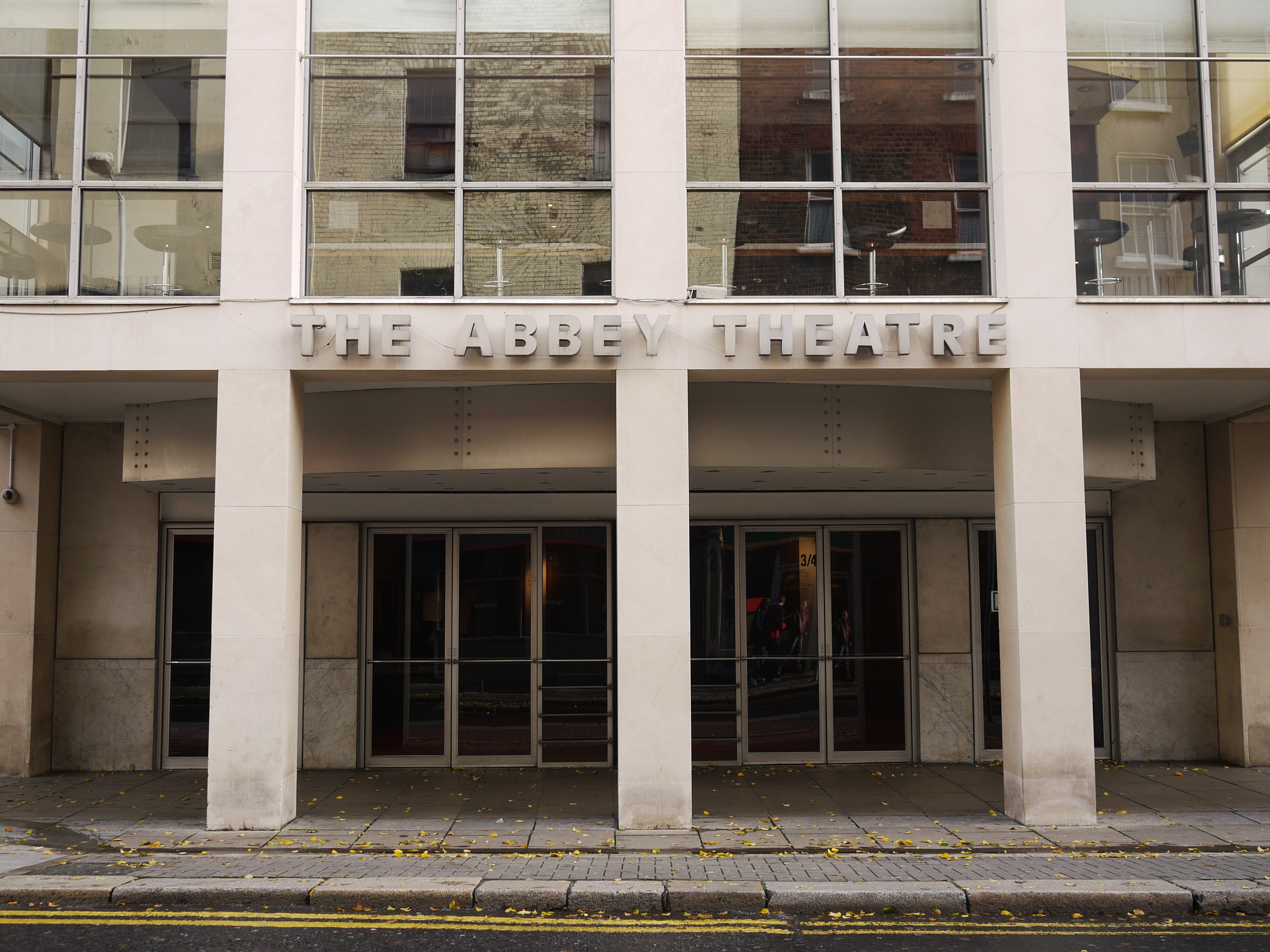
Eithne Dunne had many roles in the Abbey Theatre. She had a strong connection to the theatre

Dunne's daughter, Anne, was a cosmetologist in Switzerland. Dunne performed in The Playboy Of the Western World a number of times and went to New York with the play. Her work was also experienced in the Dublin Film Festival in September 1961 when she performed as Mrs. Warren in Mrs. Warrens Profession by George Bernard Shaw. Her work also was experienced on the screen in the movie 8 o'clock walk directed by Lance Comfort where she played Mrs. Evans, this was a big opportunity which caused her to leave Ireland for Britain. She travelled to New York which paved the way for other actresses to also go to the United States. Dunne was featured in many famous Irish playwrights work both in New York and in Ireland. Her work has been highly commended by fellow playwrights as well as within well regarded news articles.

Dunne expressed a keen interest in having other actresses have the same opportunities she had as she was one of few actresses who was able to make a living from her work in plays and films at the time. She explained how acting is a precarious career and how she found that her work in both the Gate Theatre and the Abbey Theatre allowed her to build up her repertoire and therefore pass her experiences onto other actresses. Dunne's association with Michael MacLiammoir in plays such as Wuthering Heights and her involvement with Longford Production since their establishment in 1944 have further cemented her place in Irish theatrical history. Fellow actors and actresses often praised her work, and many of them travelled to Ireland to attend her memorial mass and commemorate her life.

== Partial filmography ==
- No Resting Place (1951) – Meg Kyle
- Eight O'Clock Walk (1954) – Mrs. Evans
- She Didn't Say No! (1958) – Miss Hogan
- Shake Hands with the Devil (1959) – Eileen O'Leary
- Dementia 13 (1963) – Lady Haloran
- The Mutations (1974) – Nurse (final film role)
