= Battle of Blood Island =

1960 film

- Theatrical release poster
- Directed by: Joel Rapp
- Written by: Joel Rapp
- Based on: Expect the Vandals by Philip Roth
- Produced by: Stanley Bickman
- Starring: Richard Devon; Ron Kennedy
- Cinematography: Jacques R. Marquette
- Edited by: Carlo Lodato
- Music by: Fred Katz
- Production companies: Bickman/Rapp Productions; San Juan Productions
- Distributed by: Filmgroup
- Release date: April 8, 1960 (United States)
- Running time: 71 minutes
- Country: United States
- Language: English
- Budget: $51,579.31
- Box office: $28,828.12

Battle of Blood Island is a 1960 American World War II war film filmed in Puerto Rico and directed by Joel Rapp. It was based on the 1958 short story Expect the Vandals by Philip Roth. Filmgroup released the film, as a double feature with Ski Troop Attack.

Roger Corman appears at the end of the movie as an American soldier.

== Cast ==
- Richard Devon as Moe
- Ron Kennedy as Ken

== Production ==
Corman put up $31,129.31 of the budget with $14,000 provided by Stan Bickman and Joel Rapp. The movie was shot in Puerto Rico at the same time as two other Corman productions: Last Woman on Earth and Creature from the Haunted Sea.

Corman later said that "it turned out very nicely; it was a good little picture."

== See also ==
- Beach Red (1967)
