= T-Bird Gang =

- Directed by: Richard Harbinger
- Screenplay by: Tony Miller and John Brinkley
- Produced by: Stanley Bickman
- Starring: John Brinkley; Edwin Nelson; Tony Miller
- Cinematography: Larry Raimond
- Edited by: Marvin Walowitz
- Music by: Original score by Shelly Manne and His Men: Monty Budwig; Russ Freeman; Charley Mariano; Stu Williamson
- Production company: Sparta Productions
- Distributed by: The Filmgroup
- Release dates: June 21, 1959 (Fargo); October 16, 1959 (nationwide, official)
- Running time: 66 minutes
- Country: United States
- Language: English

T-Bird Gang is a 1959 American movie directed by Richard Harbinger in his first and only film. It was co-written by and starring John Brinkley and Tony Miller with Edwin Nelson; all of them had appeared in several of Roger Corman's films.

== Plot ==
A group of criminals rob a warehouse where they cosh the elderly night watchman. The watchman's ex-G.I. son Frank finds his barely conscious father who soon dies from the injury; his last words being that the group drove a white T-Bird. Frank tracks the gang down with the idea of vengeance, but the police apprehend him and force him into getting his revenge by infiltrating the gang of robbin' hoods.

== Production ==
Shot in 1958 under the title of Cry Out in Vengeance, it was released by executive producer Roger Corman as a double feature with High School Big Shot as the first release of his Filmgroup company.

Corman financed the film.

In February 1959 Filmgroup announced they would release ten films. Their first movies were High School Big Shot (1959) and T-Bird Gang (1959) produced by Stanley Bickman.

== Cast ==
- John Brinkley as Frank Simmons, alias Frank Minor
- Edwin Nelson as Alex Hendricks
- Tony Miller as Raymond Gunderson
- Patricia George as Marla Stanosky, alias Marla Stanley
- Coleman Francis as Capt. R. M. Prell
- Nola Thorp as Kay
- Beach Dickerson as Barney Adams
- Trent Dollar as Boy
- Gene Walker
- Steve Harris
- Robert Wendell
- Henry Randolph
- Vic Tayback as a policeman
- Glenn Campbell
- Earl Miles
