= Malcolm Lee Beggs =

American actor (1907–1956)

- Born: 1907; East Orange, New Jersey, U.S.
- Died: December 10, 1956 (aged 48–49); Chicago, Illinois, U.S.
- Resting place: Kensico Cemetery
- Occupation: Actor
- Years active: 1912–1956

Malcolm Lee Beggs (1907 – December 10, 1956) was an American stage, television and film actor.

== Biography ==
He began performing professionally on the stage at the age of five. He made appearances in two silent films: The Silent Plea (1914) and In Bridal Attire (1915). In 1936 he made his Broadway debut as Don Abacchio in Bitter Stream. He went on to appear in the original Broadway productions of Devils Galore (1945), Metropole (1949), Seventh Heaven (1955), and Mr. Wonderful (1956). He also starred as William M. Tweed in the 1947 Broadway revival of Up in Central Park.

On television, Beggs made guest appearances on Captain Video and His Video Rangers (1949), Lux Video Theatre (1951), Hopalong Cassidy (1952), three episodes of Hallmark Hall of Fame (1952–1953), four episodes of Kraft Theatre (1949–1953), Campbell Summer Soundstage (1954), Robert Montgomery Presents (1954), Ponds Theater (1954), and The Elgin Hour (1955). His film credits include Love Island (1952), It Grows on Trees (1952), Botany Bay (1953), Houdini (1953), and Edge of Fury (1958).

On December 10, 1956, Beggs was beaten to death with whisky and beer bottles at the age of 48 or 49 in his Chicago hotel room by two men, Robert Mitchell, 17 (also known as Melvin Manes) and Haskell Kellems, 18. His interment was in Valhalla, New York's Kensico Cemetery.
