= Ted Berkman =

American author, screenwriter and journalist (1914–2006)

Ted Berkman (January 9, 1914 – May 12, 2006) was an American author, screenwriter and journalist best known for writing the screenplay for Bedtime for Bonzo.

== Early life and career ==
He was born Edward Oscar Berkmann in Brooklyn, New York in 1914. He grew up in a middle-class Jewish family and attended Cornell University, graduating in 1933, and Columbia University. Before World War II, he wrote a couple of film scripts and as a journalist for the New York Daily Mirror. During World War II, he worked as an intelligence officer for the US Army. After the war, Berkman worked as a foreign correspondent giving the first report of the explosion of the King David Hotel in Jerusalem in 1946 on ABC Radio. He later became an informal adviser to Edward Murrow on foreign affairs and appeared regularly on television programs.

== Screenwriter ==
During the 1950s, Berkman worked primarily as a screenwriter. Bedtime for Bonzo was the first film he wrote during that period (with his brother-in-law Raphael Blau). The 1951 film became more famous during the 1980s when its star Ronald Reagan became US President. He also wrote the screen play for the 1957 movie Fear Strikes Out starring Anthony Perkins and based on the book written by professional baseball player Jimmy Piersall about his mental illness. He wrote two more screenplays during the decade including United Artists Edge of Fury in 1958 and Girl in the Night for Warner Brothers in 1960.

== Author ==
Berkman's first book Cast a Giant Shadow was written about Mickey Marcus, a West Point graduate who advised the Israeli military during the 1948 Arab–Israeli War. He also wrote the screenplay for the 1966 film starring Kirk Douglas based on the book.

His next book Sabra was based on the story of a dozen Israeli fighters in the Six-Day War and was published in 1969. He wrote three more books during the 1970s including My Prisoner, cowritten with Janey Jimenez about Patty Hearst. His final book, a memoir, was published in 1998.

Berkman died of cancer in 2006 in Santa Barbara, California.
