= The Proud Rebel =

1958 film by Michael Curtiz

- Theatrical release poster
- Directed by: Michael Curtiz
- Written by: Joseph Petracca; Lillie Hayward
- Based on: Journal of Linnett Moore; 1947 story in The Country Gentleman by James Edward Grant
- Produced by: Samuel Goldwyn Jr
- Starring: Alan Ladd; Olivia de Havilland
- Cinematography: Ted D. McCord
- Edited by: Aaron Stell
- Music by: Jerome Moross
- Production company: Formosa Productions
- Distributed by: Buena Vista Film Distribution Co., Inc. (United States and Canada); Metro-Goldwyn-Mayer (International)
- Release date: May 28, 1958
- Running time: 103 minutes
- Country: United States
- Language: English
- Budget: $1,600,000
- Box office: $1.5 million

The Proud Rebel is a 1958 American Technicolor Western film directed by Michael Curtiz, with a screenplay by Joseph Petracca and Lillie Hayward that was based on a story by James Edward Grant. It is the story of a widowed Confederate veteran and his mute son who struggle to make a new life among sometimes hostile neighbors in the Midwest. Despite the implications of the title, the main character in "The Proud Rebel" does not dwell much on his Southern past, but finds his life complicated by sectional prejudice. Many of the Yankee male town folk refer to him disdainfully, however, as 'Reb', while noting his proud refusal to compromise his values for any price.

The film stars Alan Ladd, Olivia de Havilland, Dean Jagger, David Ladd and Cecil Kellaway and features Harry Dean Stanton (credited as Dean Stanton) in an early film appearance.

== Plot ==
A former Confederate soldier, John Chandler has come to an Illinois town with his 10-year-old son David to see Dr. Enos Davis. The boy was struck mute after witnessing his mother burned to death when Union soldiers set fire to their homestead, and has not spoken a word since. Dr. Davis recommends an operation by a doctor he knows in Minnesota.

In the street outside Dr. Davis' office, Chandler tells his expert sheepdog, Lance, to clear the road of a flock of sheep being herded through town. The sheep belong to rancher Harry Burleigh and his sons, Jeb and Tom; trained dogs are extremely valuable and they try to steal it. Chandler fights them while a passing stranger, Linnett Moore, keeps David safe and out of the way. Harry knocks out Chandler, pours whiskey on him, then tells the sheriff about being attacked by a drunk.

Chandler must pay $30 or serve 30 days in jail. Linnett intervenes, suggesting to the sheriff that Chandler can work off the debt on her farm. In exchange she offers to cover the fine, so that he will be released. Chandler disagrees at first, but is won over by her decency. Over time, he discovers that Linnett is being pressured by the overbearing Burleigh to sell her land, which blocks the easy passage of his sheep to pasture and the railroad. Gradually, Chandler and Linnett grow closer, despite Chandler being determined to remain aloof, knowing he and his son will leave soon.

A trip to Minnesota for treatment is expensive but Chandler will not accept offers for the dog, as David loves the animal. But Chandler decides to sell Lance after all, for a high price, to finance the trip and operation. He asks Linnett to accompany the boy up north while he harvests her crops and rebuilds the barn burned down by the Burleighs' men in an attempt to pressure Linnett to sell.

The operation does not work. After returning home David is devastated to find their dog Lance gone. The dog will not herd for his new owner, and the Burleighs manage to acquire it to use to pressure Chandler and Linnett. When Chandler goes to their farm to try to buy the dog back, Harry tells Chandler he can have the dog as a gift, but has already told his two sons to help murder him, as an apparent thief, as he leaves their property. David arrives at the farm just when gunshots start and it is clear that the Burleighs did not intend to let his father leave. Seeing one of the sons preparing to shoot from a new hiding spot, David shouts out a warning to his father. Hearing the warning, Chandler is able to turn and shoot that son first, then Burleigh. The other son puts down his rifle instead of shooting. Chandler walks with David and Lance, while leading his horse, back to Linnett's farm, with David beginning to re-learn how to speak.

== Cast ==
- Alan Ladd as John Chandler
- Olivia de Havilland as Linnett Moore
- Dean Jagger as Harry Burleigh
- David Ladd as David Chandler
- Cecil Kellaway as Dr. Enos Davis (Quaker)
- James Westerfield as Birm Bates
- Dean Stanton as Jeb Burleigh
- Thomas Pittman as Tom Burleigh
- Henry Hull as Judge Morley
- Eli Mintz as Mr. Gorman
- John Carradine as Traveling Salesman
- King as Lance, David's Dog

Uncredited

- Percy Helton as Photographer
- Dan White as Court Clerk
- Mary Wickes as Mrs. Ainsley

== Production ==
The film was based on a 1947 short story by James Edward Grant. Film rights were bought by Sam Goldwyn who gave them to his son in 1950. Goldwyn Jr. said the film would be about his favorite kind of story, "the theme of the undefeated man." He announced the project would be filmed in 1955 based on a script by Joseph Petracca. However it ended up taking him a few years to source financing.

Goldwyn Jr. had budgeted the project at $1.6 million but had trouble securing financing over $1 million. He decided not to compromise and go for the larger budget without having sold it to a distributor. Goldwyn Jr.:

I really had no other choice. To me it was very important that this story be filmed as I thought it should be done or not at all. I suddenly realized that if I couldn't do it the way I saw it, I wouldn't be an independent producer. I was able to borrow $1,200,000 from the Bank of America – my father signed the loan with me – and I put up the rest of the money.

Alan Ladd signed to co-star with his son David under the direction of Michael Curtiz. Goldwyn Jr said "Michael Curtiz has drawn fine performances from both of them. The boy, when I first spoke to him, was stiff and frightened, but when I started talking to him about his father, his face lighted up and I knew he was right for the part."

Adolphe Menjou was meant to play a supporting role but pulled out.

The movie was shot in Cedar City, Utah. Parts of the film were shot in Cedar Mountain, Rush Valley, and Johnson Canyon in Utah. Its external scenes depicting the U.S.Midwest—a flat and well-vegetated landscape, are a bit jarring to compare to Utah's arid, hilly and mountainous backdrop.

Once the movie was completed, Goldwyn Jr. showed it to distributors and succeeded in securing deals with Buena Vista for the U.S. and Loews internationally.

== Critical reception ==
A contemporary review in Variety described the film as a "suspenseful and fast-action post-Civil War yarn" with "characterizations that hold forth most strongly, topped perhaps by the very appealing performance of David Ladd." Critic A.H. Weiler wrote in The New York Times that the film was "a genuinely sentimental but often moving drama" and an "honestly heartwarming drama" that "is more concerned with exposing character than mayhem." While praising the performances, the review also notes that "A viewer might justifiably observe that the tale is spun somewhat unevenly, that it slows down on a few occasions and that the 'happy ending' is telegraphed. But these [...] are minor matters." A review in TV Guide described the film as a "warm-hearted story" with "[b]rilliant performances (especially David Ladd's) and the unusual characterization of de Havilland's hardened, loner widow" and "fine color photography of the Utah landscape."

== Influence ==
The Proud Rebel influenced Indian actor Kishore Kumar, to remake it as Door Gagan Ki Chhaon Mein in 1964, with his real-life son Amit Kumar playing the role of the mute son.

== See also ==
- List of American films of 1958
