= Devil's Partner =

1961 film

- Theatrical release poster
- Directed by: Charles R. Rondeau
- Written by: Stanley Clements; Laura Jean Mathews
- Produced by: Hugh Hooker
- Starring: Ed Nelson; Edgar Buchanan; Jean Allison; Richard Crane
- Cinematography: Edward Cronjager
- Edited by: Howard Epstein
- Music by: Ronald Stein
- Distributed by: Filmgroup
- Release dates: 1961 (St. Louis, Missouri)
- Running time: 60 minutes
- Country: United States
- Language: English

Devil's Partner, also known as The Devil's Partner, (Note: The opening title credits read "Devil's Partner". However, several sources, including the AFI, refer to the film as The Devil's Partner.) is a 1961 black-and-white American supernatural horror film starring Ed Nelson, Edgar Buchanan, Richard Crane and Byron Foulger. It was directed by Charles R. Rondeau and produced by Hugh Hooker (an actor and stuntman who had previously made the 1958 film The Littlest Hobo).

The film was completed in 1958, but it was not released until it was acquired by Roger and Gene Corman's Filmgroup and released in 1961, often paired with another Filmgroup title Creature from the Haunted Sea, according to Bill Warren.

== Plot summary ==
Set in rural Furnace Flats, New Mexico, the film opens with a hunched old man, Pete Jensen, slaughtering a goat and daubing its blood within a hexagon drawn on the floor of his shack, and asking for "two more years". Days later, a young man, Nick Richards, arrives in town, asking about Pete, claiming he was his uncle. The town's sheriff informs Nick that Pete is dead. Nick decides to set up residence in Pete's shack. While there, he engages in a series of demonic rituals designed to drive a wedge between Nell Lucas and her fiancé, auto-mechanic David Simpson. One evening, after a date with Nell, David is mysteriously attacked and disfigured by his pet dog. Nick offers to substitute for David at his gas station while he recovers. Those alerted to Nick's presence notice that even though it is incredibly hot, the immaculately dressed Nick fails to perspire. Yet with the exception of the sheriff's dog, the town's inhabitants feel comfortable in his presence.

Meanwhile, further animal-related incidents occur. A plastic surgeon, called to help David, dies when a steer lies down in the road in front of his speeding car, causing him to crash. A local drunk is trampled by a horse. A rattlesnake threatens David in his bedroom, but he shoots it before it escapes. Eventually, the town doctor finally guesses that Nick, the victim of demonic possession, is behind the hostile animal incidents. He correctly theorize that the old man, Pete, and his nephew Nick are actually one and the same. In the film's climax, the doctor and the sheriff, along with Nell and David, witness Nick transforming into a stallion. As he gallops away, however, the sheriff brings him down with several gunshots, and he transforms first into Nick, and finally into Pete, before dying. At this point, David's facial wounds miraculously disappear, David and Nell hold hands, and the townsfolk stand over Nick's body.

== Cast ==
- Ed Nelson as Nick Richards / Pete Jensen
- Edgar Buchanan as Doc Lucas
- Jean Allison as Nell Lucas
- Richard Crane as David Simpson
- Spencer Carlisle as Sheriff Tom Fuller
- Byron Foulger as Papers
- Claire Carleton as Ida
- Brian O'Hara as Harry Matthews
- Harry Fleer as John Winters
- Joe Hooker as Deputy Joe
- Hugh Hooker as Mr. Johnson
- Riley Hill as Frank
- Laura Jean Mathews as Martha Winters

== Release ==
Several months after editing the film, the Los Angeles Times announced that Charles R. Rondeau was being sued for divorce by his wife, Marlys E. Rondeau. In their divorce, she sought interest in Devil's Partner as part of her settlement. Distribution rights were later sold to Roger Corman's Filmgroup, Inc. The first release to be reported in Variety took place the week of June 27, 1961 at the Fox Theatre in St. Louis, Missouri.

== Critical reaction ==
Author/critic Bryan Senn wrote that director Charles R. Rondeau "cuts through the bull to deliver an atmospheric, intimate little supernatural thriller." Praising the "earnest" cast members, including Jean Allison and Edgar Buchanan, Senn continues that even if the film is "perhaps predictable...you could do far worse than to shake hands with The Devil's Partner.

Horror-film scholar Eric Michael Mazur has identified Devil's Partner as part of a scary subgenre that took advantage of the early 1960s' obsession with "hysteria over juvenile delinquency and the accessibility of strange new religions." As a result of these social concerns, an environment resulted where "the Devil film became nearly ubiquitous."

Commenting on Devil's Partner, critic David Goldweber was delighted by the film's blending of "sweet 1950s' small-town ambience with shape-shifting devil worship." While admitting that he "might be overrating it because I like this kind of thing...the acting, directing, script, and dialogue are all above average."
