= Verboten! =

1959 film by Samuel Fuller

- Directed by: Samuel Fuller
- Written by: Samuel Fuller
- Produced by: Samuel Fuller
- Starring: James Best; Susan Cummings; Tom Pittman; Harold Daye
- Cinematography: Joseph Biroc
- Edited by: Philip Cahn
- Music by: Harry Sukman
- Production companies: RKO Radio Pictures; Globe Enterprises
- Distributed by: Columbia Pictures
- Release date: March 25, 1959 (US)
- Running time: 93 minutes 87 minutes (TCM print)
- Country: United States
- Language: English

Verboten! is a 1959 American romantic war drama film written, produced, and directed by Samuel Fuller and starring James Best, Susan Cummings, Tom Pittman, and Harold Daye. It was the last film of the influential but troubled RKO Radio Pictures studio, which co-produced it with Fuller's own Globe Enterprises. It was filmed at the RKO Forty Acres backlot. Distribution was handled by Columbia Pictures.

Verboten! was the first of Samuel Fuller's films to be set during World War II, of which he was a veteran. He had previously drawn on his war experience to make movies about the Korean War and the French Indochina War. Raymond Harvey was the film's technical adviser; he had previously worked with Fuller on his Fixed Bayonets! (1951).

== Plot ==
Near the end of World War II in Europe, American Sergeant David Brent loses two men and is himself wounded while hunting down and killing a sniper in an unnamed German city. He falls unconscious in front of a young German woman, Helga Schiller. When he awakes, he finds that she has tended his wound rather than killing him. She also protects him from her bitter younger brother, Franz. When the Waffen-SS set up an artillery observation post in Helga's building, she hides David to prove she is not a Nazi. Later, the Americans capture the city, and David is sent to a hospital.

After Germany surrenders, David returns to the city and marries Helga, despite being warned by his commanding officer. Because American soldiers are verboten (forbidden) to fraternize with German women, he resigns from the Army and goes to work as a civilian administrator in the Food Office of the Military Government.

One day, Helga spots a friend, returning German soldier Bruno Eckhart. She breaks the news to him that his parents were killed by Allied bombing and his girlfriend committed suicide because she mistakenly believed the Russians were coming. Bruno congratulates her on landing someone she herself calls her "American goldmine". She persuades David to vouch for him, which enables Bruno to get one of the scarce good jobs, as a policeman. What neither Helga nor David know is that Bruno is a member of Werwolf, a Nazi underground organization bent on regaining control of Germany, beginning with sabotage and sneak attacks. Bruno uses his position to infiltrate other Werwolf members into the government and becomes their leader. Franz also joins the organization.

When a food shipment is hijacked by Werwolf, the German civilians blame the Americans and demonstrate in front of the building where David works. David is fired after he foolishly attacks their spokesman and is pummeled by the mob. Bruno turns David against Helga, even though she is pregnant, by telling the American that she married him only for the food and shelter he could provide. When David confronts Helga, she admits that it was true to begin with, but that she eventually fell in love with him; he does not believe her and storms out.

Meanwhile, Franz's conscience begins troubling him after he witnesses an incident at Bruno's secret Werwolf headquarters in a railroad boxcar. After a Werwolf member bitterly protests against the theft of medicine intended for the German people, Bruno stabs him to death. When Franz has a nightmare about the murder, Helga discovers that he is part of Werwolf. Determined to show him the error of his ways, she takes him to the first session of the Nuremberg Trials. Horrified by what he learns, he reveals what he knows, enabling the American authorities to smash the Werwolf operation in the area. Upon learning what Helga did, David reconciles with her. Franz goes to the boxcar to retrieve an invaluable list of Werwolf members, but is caught in the act by Bruno. In the ensuing struggle, Franz manages to knock Bruno out, but is trapped inside when the boxcar catches fire. David rushes in and rescues his brother-in-law.

== Cast ==
- James Best as Sgt. David Brent
- Susan Cummings as Helga Schiller / Brent
- Tom Pittman as Bruno Eckart
- Paul Dubov as Capt. R. Harvey
- Harold Daye as Franz Schiller
- Dick Kallman as Helmuth Strasser
- Stuart Randall as Colonel
- Steven Gerayas Mayor (Burghermeister) of Rothbach
- Anna Hope as Frau Schiller
- Robert Boon as SS officer
- Sasha Harden as Eric Heiden
- Paul Busch as Gunther Dietrich
- Neyle Morrow as Sfc. Kellogg
- Joe Turkel as Infantryman

== Production ==
In January 1950, the Los Angeles Times reported that the film would be made on location in Germany by Solar Productions, a newly formed company consisting of Dane Clark, Sam Fuller, and James Wong Howe; Clark would star, Fuller would write and direct, and Howe would shoot it (Howe and Fuller had just made Baron of Arizona together). However Fuller went on to make two Korean War movies for 20th Century Fox instead. In August 1951, he announced he wanted to make Verboten in Germany with Gene Evans.

However the movie was not made for a number of years. In 1954, the Los Angeles Times reported that Terry Moore wanted to star in the film for Fuller with Howard Hughes to produce. In September 1957, Hedda Hopper announced Fuller would make the film for RKO.

One of the cast, Tom Pittman, died in a car crash in November 1958.

== Critical reception ==
The Los Angeles Times called it "rather potent." The New York Times called it "a fast, unpretentious melodrama... that may lack subtlety but conveys a sharp, uncluttered impression of contemporary European attitudes towards Americans."

Verboten! is held in fairly high esteem by contemporary critics. In his short review for the Chicago Reader, Dave Kehr referred to the film as "sleazy masterwork," describing it as "sweaty, claustrophobic, occasionally frenzied, and often brilliant."

The Time Out Film Guide summarizes the movie as "the great Fuller at his punchy, unsubtle best," adding that "Fuller's methods may not be sophisticated, but they are complex; as such, his own inimitably brash brand of didactism makes for riveting and powerful cinema."

== Home media ==
Warner Archives released Verboten! on DVD in the United States on June 22, 2010.

== See also ==
- List of American films of 1959
