= Betsy Jones-Moreland =

American actress (1930–2006)

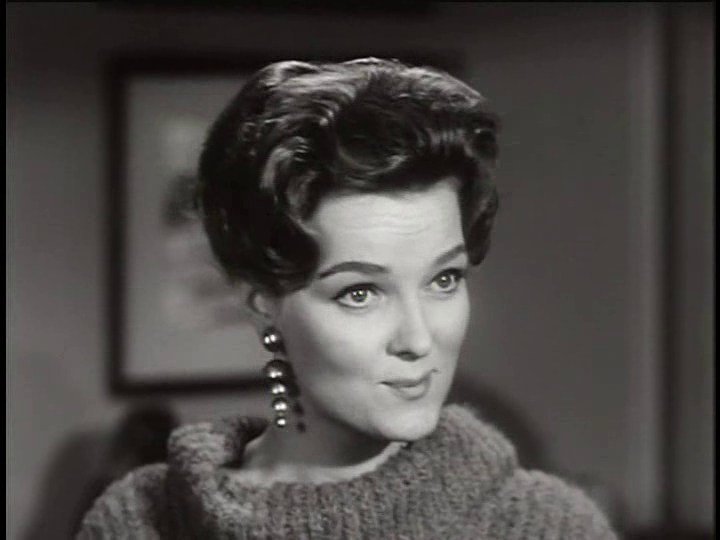
- Jones-Moreland in Murder Is A Grave Affair
- Born: April 1, 1930
- Died: May 1, 2006 (aged 76); El Monte, California, U.S.
- Occupation: Actress
- Years active: 1956–1993

Betsy Jones-Moreland (April 1, 1930 – May 1, 2006) was an American actress.

== Early life ==
Jones-Moreland worked in secretarial jobs before she became an entertainer.

== Career ==
Jones-Moreland acted on stage, including as a member of the newly formed Valley Playhouse in Woodland Hills, California, in 1958 and the Players Ring Theater in Los Angeles in 1960. She also appeared in The Solid Gold Cadillac on Broadway and in the touring company that presented that play across the United States.

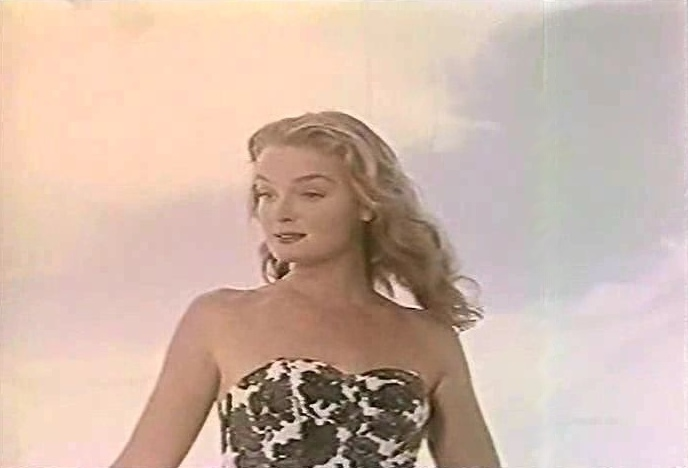
Betsy Jones-Moreland in Last Woman on Earth (1960)

She began her film career in small roles in the mid-1950s, appearing in several Roger Corman films, including a lead role in Last Woman on Earth (1960). Subsequently, she appeared mostly on television through 1975.

Jones-Moreland guest-starred in an episode of the television series Ironside starring Raymond Burr, and in the early 1990s appeared in a recurring role as a judge in a series of his Perry Mason television films. Her first Perry Mason appearance was in 1959 as Lorrie Garvin in "The Case of the Dubious Bridegroom." In Have Gun - Will Travel, Jones-Moreland guest-starred as Topaz, a saloon hostess who befriended Paladin in the episode "Brother's Keeper" that aired May 6, 1961. In 1962, she appeared as Nurse Brown in McHale's Navy.

== Filmography ==
=== Film ===
Year	Title	Role	Notes
1956	The Eddy Duchin Story	Minor Role	Uncredited
1956	The Best Things in Life Are Free	Secretary	Uncredited
1956	Full of Life	Bit Role	Uncredited
1957	The Garment Jungle	Secretary	Uncredited
1957	Operation Mad Ball	Lt. Bushey	Uncredited
1957	The Brothers Rico	Additional Character (voice)	Uncredited
1957	The Viking Women and the Sea Serpent	Thyra	
1958	The True Story of Lynn Stuart	Ginger - Carhop	Uncredited
1958	Screaming Mimi	Jan - Raoul's Assistant	Uncredited
1959	Day of the Outlaw	Mrs. Preston	
1960	Strangers When We Meet	Mrs. Gerandi	Uncredited
1960	Last Woman on Earth	Evelyn Gern	
1961	Creature from the Haunted Sea	Mary-Belle Monahan	
1967	The St. Valentine's Day Massacre	Poolside Interviewer	Uncredited
1975	The Hindenburg	Stewardess Imhoff	
1976	Gable and Lombard	Party Guest	
1976	The Last Tycoon	Lady Writer	
1979	Joni	Mrs. Barber	

=== Television ===
Year	Title	Role	Notes
1958	Studio One	Kitty O'Donoghue	Episode: "Birthday Present"
1958	Dick Powell's Zane Grey Theatre	Lucy Parney	Episode: "To Sit in Judgment"
1959	M Squad	Carla Kinross	Episode: "The Harpies"
1959	Markham	Diana Rogers	Episode: "A Princely Sum"
1959	Perry Mason	Lorrie Garvin	Episode: "The Case of the Dubious Bridegroom"
1959	Alcoa Theatre	Harriet MacLore	Episode: "Small Bouquet"
1959	General Electric Theater	Woman Taking Off Ring; Rita	Episode: "Night Club"; Episode: "Platinum on the Rocks"
1959, 1960	The Danny Thomas Show	Gloria; Doris Henshaw	Episode: "Kathy Crashes TV"; Episode: "Kathy, the Matchmaker"
1960	Philip Marlowe	Marian	Episode: "Murder Is a Grave Affair"
1960	Bachelor Father	Melanie Bannister	Episode: "Kelly: The Career Woman"
1960	The Man from Blackhawk	Mrs. Thornton	Episode: "Incident at Tupelo"
1960	Michael Shayne	Ellen	Episode: "The Poison Pen Club"
1960, 1961	Have Gun – Will Travel	Mrs. Neal; Topaz	Episode: "The Poker Fiend"; Episode: "Brother's Keeper"
1960–1962	The Donna Reed Show	Mrs. Pratt; Janet Palmer; Geri	Episode: "Someone Is Watching"; Episode: "Aloha, Kimi"; Episode: "Big Star"
1961	My Three Sons	Flo Afton	Episode: "The Horseless Saddle"
1961, 1962	Route 66	Bea Webster; Lila Bain	Episode: "The Quick and the Dead"; Episode: "Lizard's Leg and Owlet's Wing"
1962	The New Breed	Claire Arnet	Episode: "The Deadlier Sex"
1962	McHale's Navy	Lt. Casey Brown	Episode: "McHale and His Seven Cupids"
1962	It's a Man's World	Miss Dugan	Episode: "Chicago Gains a Number"
1963	Dr. Kildare	Ruth Jonah	Episode: "A Trip to Niagra"
1963	Bonanza	Nora Whitley	Episode: "Five into the Wind"
1963	Gunsmoke	Tess	Episode: "Kate Heller"
1963	My Favorite Martian	Miss Weaver	Episode: "MAn or Amoeba"
1963–1965	Ben Casey	Dr. Doris Kane; Claire; Elly Galanos	Episode: "Justice to a Microbe; Episode: "The Lonely Ones"; Episode: "Run for Your Lives, Dr. Galanos Practices Here"
1964	The Outer Limits	Julie Griffith	Episode: "The Mutant"
1964	The Greatest Show on Earth	Louella Grant	Episode: "You're All Right, Ivy"
1964	R. B. & Myrnalene	Cara	Sitcom pilot, filmed in 1961
1964	My Three Sons	Congresswoman Barbara Maitland	Episode: "Lady President"
1964	Profiles in Courage	Sally	Episode: "Governor John M. Slaton"
1965	Flipper	Lynn Borden	Episode: "Lifeguard"
1965	The Donna Reed Show	Dorothy Evans	Episode: "Never Look a Gift Horse in the Mouth"
1966	Morning Star	Dana Manning	Episode: "#1.118"
1967, 1969	Judd for the Defense	Miss Davis; Mrs. Tiffin	Episode: "Shadow of a Killer"; Episode: "Epitaph on a Computer Card"
1969	Ironside	Karen Martin	Episode: "A Drug on the Market"
1969	The Ghost & Mrs. Muir	Mrs. Post	Episode: "The Great Power Failure"
1970	Bright Promise	Elizabeth Walker	Episodes: "#1.127" and "#1.129"
1970	The Young Lawyers	Mrs. Harris	Episode: "A Simple Thing Called Justice"
1971	The Bold Ones: The Lawyers	Hazel Abbott	Episode: "The Search for Leslie Grey"
1972	The Bold Ones: The New Doctors	Miss Walker	Episode: "A Substitute Womb"
1972, 1975, 1977	Days of Our Lives	Mrs. Collins; Mrs. Chambers; Mrs. Abbott	8 episodes 1 episode 11 episodes
1973	Bridget Loves Bernie	Mrs. O'Shay	Episode: "To Teach or Not to Teach"
1973	Toma	Woman Manager	Episode: "Blockhouse Breakdown"
1974	Police Story	Motel Owner #2	Episode: "Wyatt Earp Syndrome"
1976	Gibbsville	(unknown)	Episode: "Afternoon Waltz"
1977	The Feather & Father Gang	Secretary	Episode: "The Golden Fleece"
1978	Police Woman	Karen	Episode: "Murder with Pretty People"
1990–1993	Perry Mason	Judge Elinor Harrelson	7 television films
