= Raphael Blau =

American screenwriter

Raphael David Blau (August 11, 1912 – March 31, 1996) was an American screenwriter who co-wrote the story for Bedtime for Bonzo (1951), among other film productions.

Blau was raised in New York City and London. His first film credit was for Mother Is a Freshman (1949). Based on seeing research speculation that a chimpanzee might be able to be raised like a human child, he conceived of the Bedtime for Bonzo story. He shared a script with his brother-in-law, Ted Berkman, and becoming partners on this and other projects, both received a story credit for the film. Fear Strikes Out (1957) about the baseball player Jimmy Piersall brought Blau and Berkman their greatest acclaim.

In 1962, Blau and his wife Helen moved to Nova Scotia. Their son Joel Blau is a professor at Stony Brook University School of Social Welfare in New York. Their daughter Deborah Blau is a graphic artist and tour guide who lives in New York City.
