= Charles Hannawalt =

American film producer

- Born: January 15, 1910; Los Angeles, California
- Died: June 7, 1973 (aged 63); Los Angeles, California
- Occupations: Key grip Producer; Cinematographer

Charles Hannawalt (January 15, 1910 – June 7, 1973) was an American film producer.

== Career ==
He worked in the film industry from 1956 to 1971, most frequently as a key grip for low-budget films directed and/or produced by Roger Corman and released by American International Pictures, and also produced a handful of exploitation films.

He is probably best known as the cinematographer for Francis Ford Coppola's Dementia 13, the only film in which he worked in that capacity.

== Filmography ==
=== As producer and associate producer ===
- The Beast with a Million Eyes (1955)
- Beast from Haunted Cave (1959)
- Last Woman on Earth (1960)
- Dementia 13 (1963)
- How to Make It (1969)
- The Hard Ride (1971)
