= Joel Rapp =

American writer and director (1934–2021)

- Born: Joel Malcolm Rapp; May 22, 1934; New York, New York, U.S.
- Died: September 15, 2021 (aged 87); Beverly Hills, California, U.S.
- Occupation(s): Film director, screenwriter
- Spouse: Susan Stoller
- Children: 2
- Parent: Philip Rapp (father)

Joel Malcolm Rapp (May 22, 1934 – September 15, 2021) was an American writer and director who worked extensively in film and television.

== Life and career ==
Rapp was born in New York, and grew up in Beverly Hills, California. He was the son of Philip Rapp, and was the older brother of Paul Rapp, a production manager for film and television.

In the late 1950s, Rapp worked with producer Roger Corman as a director on the films High School Big Shot and Battle of Blood Island. He also wrote for numerous sitcoms including McHale's Navy, Bewitched, and Green Acres.

Rapp was a passionate gardener, and was nicknamed "Mr. Mother Earth, Plant Man to the Stars". He authored 14 books on gardening, and was the gardener for Live with Regis and Kathie Lee.

He died in Beverly Hills on September 15, 2021, at the age of 87. He was survived by his wife, brother and two children.

== Selected credits ==
=== Film ===
- High School Big Shot (1959)
- Battle of Blood Island (1960)

=== Television ===
- Topper
- Highway Patrol
- Lassie
- Peter Loves Mary
- The Donna Reed Show
- McHale's Navy
- The Patty Duke Show
- Bewitched
- Gilligan's Island
