= Antony Carbone =

American actor (1925–2020)

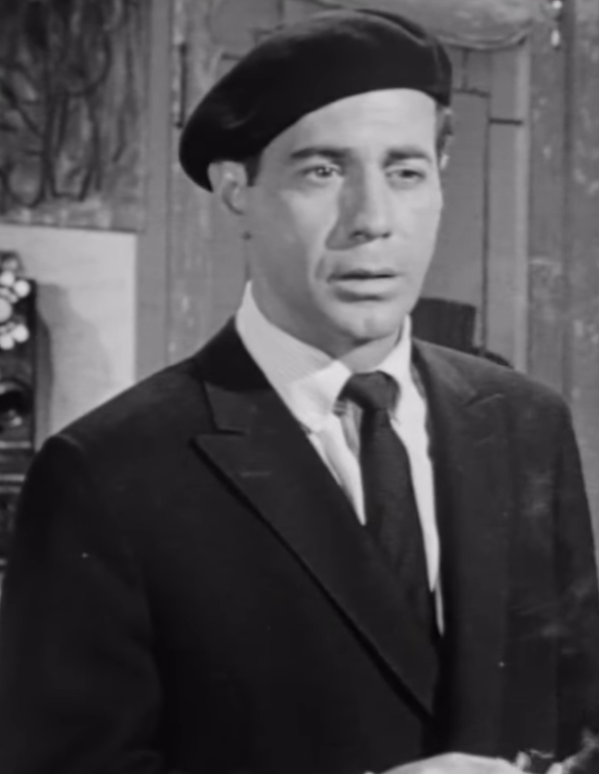
- Carbone in A Bucket of Blood, 1959
- Born: July 15, 1925; Calabria, Italy
- Died: October 7, 2020 (aged 95); Long Beach, California, U.S.
- Occupations: Actor, theatre director, teacher
- Years active: 1957–1991

Antony Carbone (July 15, 1925 – October 7, 2020) was an Italian-American film and television actor.

== Life and career ==
Carbone was born in Calabria, Italy on July 15, 1925. At an early age, he and his family relocated to Syracuse, New York. He attended and graduated from Los Angeles State College, and relocated to New York City to study drama.

He was probably known best for his acting roles in several low-budget horror movies by Roger Corman during the late 1950s and early 1960s. From the mid-1980s, he worked as a stage director in Los Angeles, California.

== Death ==
Carbone died in Long Beach, California on October 7, 2020, at the age of 95.
