= Frank Wolff =

American actor (1928–1971)

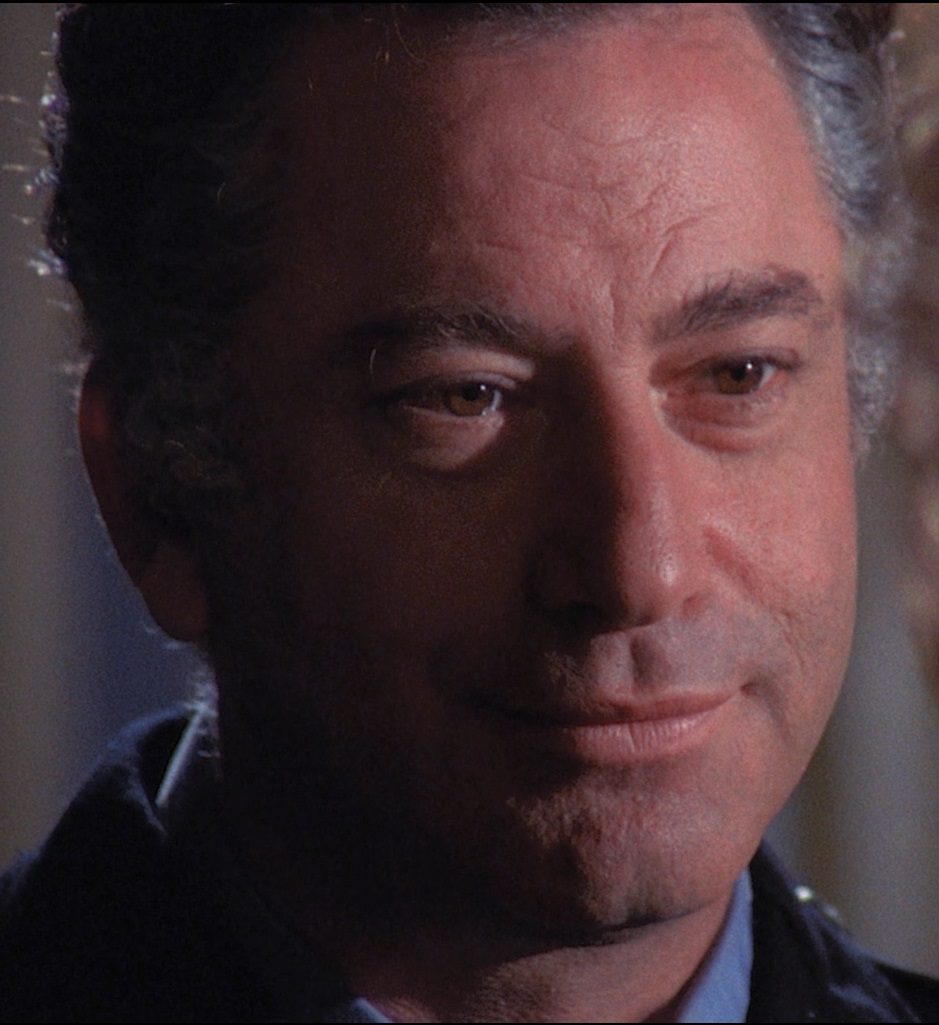
- Wolff in Cold Eyes of Fear (1971)
- Born: Walter Frank Hermann Wolff; May 11, 1928; San Francisco, California, U.S.
- Died: December 12, 1971 (aged 43); Rome, Italy
- Years active: 1958–1971

Walter Frank Hermann Wolff (May 11, 1928 – December 12, 1971) was an American actor whose film career began with roles in five 1958–61 Roger Corman productions and ended a decade later in Rome, after many appearances in European-made films, most of which were lensed in Italy.

== Early life ==
Wolff was born in San Francisco, California, the son of a Bay Area physician. Both parents were of German descent. The elder Wolff, a political and social maverick, encouraged young Frank to follow an unconventional path. He attended the University of California, Los Angeles, where he studied acting and stagecraft, wrote and directed plays and befriended another actor/director, Monte Hellman. Between 1957 and 1961, he appeared in nearly 20 episodes of TV series and feature films, a few of which fit into the horror/science fiction genre.

== Career ==
=== With Roger Corman ===
Wolff had bit roles in his first two films, Roger Corman's I Mobster and The Wasp Woman. The former, a 1958 black-and-white gangster melodrama in which Wolff does not receive billing, was presented as a first-person narrative by the title character, Murder, Inc. (fictional) boss Joe Sante (Steve Cochran). The latter, Wolff's first genre film, was a typically campy horror, filmed in 1959, in which the owner of a cosmetics business (Susan Cabot) becomes the titular monster after using one of her own experimental rejuvenating formulas. Wolff has a single, memorable scene.

Later in the year, however, Wolff's billing dramatically increased to co-lead status in his next two Corman productions, scripted by Charles B. Griffith, Beast from Haunted Cave and Ski Troop Attack. Shot back-to-back in the snowy wilderness outside Deadwood, South Dakota, the films used the same crew and cast, which, in addition to Wolff, included Michael Forest, Wally Campo, Richard Sinatra (Frank's nephew) and Sheila Carol. The first of the two, Beast, directed for Corman by Wolff's UCLA friend, Monte Hellman, remains a well-remembered low-budget horror title, with a spider-like creature menacing a trio of robbers, led by Wolff, trapped in a ski lodge. Beast was first shown in October 1959, but eventually paired on a double bill with The Wasp Woman which, in line with the other films' Dakota link, premiered in Bismarck, North Dakota, on February 12, 1960. In the equally low-budgeted Attack (not to be confused with the 1956 film by Attack by Robert Aldrich), a little-noticed World War II quickie on which Corman himself took over the directorial reins, a quartet of GIs on skis slog through a snowbound landscape.

Wolff was seen in three TV appearances in January of 1960, The Untouchables (January 7), The Lawless Years (January 19) and Rawhide (January 29). He also had the third-billed role of Baron, a nightclub owner who refuses to give another chance to alcoholic trumpet player Jack Klugman in The Twilight Zone episode "A Passage for Trumpet", broadcast on May 20.

In 1958, he appeared with another guest star, Strother Martin, in the episode "Pete Henke" of the NBC western series, Jefferson Drum, starring Jeff Richards as a crusading newspaper editor.

=== In Europe ===
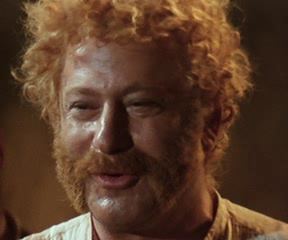
Wolff in God Forgives... I Don't! (1967)

In autumn 1960, Wolff traveled to Greece to co-star in another Roger Corman-directed, Charles B. Griffith-scripted low-budgeter, Atlas (released in May 1961). The title role was again assigned to the brawny Corman regular, Michael Forest, while the female lead went to Barboura Morris who, between 1957 and 1967, worked exclusively for Corman, appearing in thirteen of his films, including The Wasp Woman. In Atlas, Wolff was cast as the treacherous King Praximedes, a scene-stealing lead villain who was singled out by the few critics who reviewed the film. Sporting a short beard, Praximedes was alternately charming, witty, overbearing and menacing.

On Corman's advice, Wolff remained in Europe and became a well-known character actor in over fifty, mostly Italian-made, films of the 1960s, including crime/suspense "gialli" and Spaghetti Westerns. Early in his European career, he returned to Greece to essay a major, second-billed role in a more prestigious movie, the 1963 "Best Picture" Oscar nominee America, America, which producer-director-writer Elia Kazan filmed on location. As Vartan Damadian, the Armenian friend of the central character, played by Stathis Giallelis, a heavily mustached Wolff assayed a complex, multi-layered personality.

Wolff's numerous Italian films of the 1960s included The Four Days of Naples, Salvatore Giuliano, The Demon, Death Occurred Last Night, The Great Silence, God Forgives... I Don't!, One Dollar Too Many and Once Upon a Time in the West. He was also seen in a few episodes of British-produced TV series, such as The Saint and The Baron.

His final two Italian-made films, Milan Caliber 9 and When Women Lost Their Tails were released posthumously in 1972. His voice in the English-language version of Milan Caliber 9 was dubbed in by his frequent co-star and roommate at the time of his death Michael Forest.

== Death ==
Wolff committed suicide by cutting his throat in the bathroom of a residence in his Rome hotel room at the age of 43 on December 12, 1971. The victim of a long deep depressive crisis, the actor was separated from his wife Alice Campbell, who also lived in Rome. It was speculated that the unrequited love for the young woman might have contributed to Wolff's death, already suffering from a nervous breakdown for some time, after his wife had left him for another man.

== Selected filmography ==
- Kathy O' (1958) – Man (uncredited)
- I Mobster (1959) – Man (uncredited)
- The Wild and the Innocent (1959) – Henchman
- The Wasp Woman (1959) – First Delivery Man
- Beast from Haunted Cave (1959) – Alexander Ward
- Ski Troop Attack (1960) – Sgt. Potter
- Twilight Zone (1960) – Baron
- The Subterraneans (1960) – Bearded Man (uncredited)
- The Runaway (1961) – Wetback Vagrant (uncredited)
- Atlas (1961) – Proximates the Tyrant
- Salvatore Giuliano (1962) – Gaspare Pisciotta
- The Four Days of Naples (1962) – Salvatore (uncredited)
- The Verona Trial (1963) – Count Galeazzo Ciano
- The Demon (1963) – Antonio
- America America (1963) – Vartan Damadian
- Un commerce tranquille (1964) – Ginger
- Via Veneto (1964)
- Amori pericolosi (1964) – Il marito (segments "Il passo" and "La ronda")
- Situation Hopeless... But Not Serious (1965) – Quartermaster Master Sergeant
- Judith (1966) – Eli
- Agent 3S3, Massacre in the Sun (1966) – Ivan Mikhailovic
- Ringo, the Mark of Vengeance (1966) – Trikie Ferguson
- A Few Dollars for Django (1966) – Jim / Trevor Norton
- Treasure of San Gennaro (1966) – Joe
- Non faccio la guerra, faccio l'amore (1966) – Charlie Morgan
- A Stranger in Town (1967) – Aguilar
- The Million Dollar Countdown (1967) – Paul Lefèvre
- Il tempo degli avvoltoi (1967) – Joshua Tracy
- The Stranger Returns (1967) – El Plein (English version, voice, uncredited)
- God Forgives... I Don't! (1967) – Bill San Antonio
- Anyone Can Play (1967) – Cesare, Paola's husband
- Sardinia Kidnapped (1968) – Osilo
- Villa Rides (1968) – Ramirez
- One Dollar Too Many (1968) – Edwin Kean
- The Great Silence (1968) – Sheriff Gideon Burnett
- Once Upon a Time in the West (1968) – Brett McBain
- The Libertine (1968) – Dr. Giulio, the dentist
- Kill Them All and Come Back Alone (1968) – Captain Lynch
- Ecce Homo (1968) – Quentin
- Eat It (1968) – Commendatore / Mister Eat it
- I dannati della Terra (1969) – Fausto
- La battaglia del deserto (1969) – Red Wiley
- Carnal Circuit (1969) – Frank Donovan
- The Tough and the Mighty (1969) – Spina
- Sartana the Gravedigger (1969) – Buddy Ben
- L'amica (1969) – Guido Nervi
- L'amore breve (1969) – Vallauri
- Metello (1970) – Betto
- Death Occurred Last Night (1970) – Duca Lamberti
- Corbari (1970) – Ulianov
- The Lickerish Quartet (1970) – Castle owner
- When Women Had Tails (1970) – Grr
- Trasplante de un cerebro (1970) – Dr. Chambers
- The Beloved (1971) – Hector
- Cold Eyes of Fear (1971) – Arthur Welt
- Death Walks on High Heels (1971) – Dr. Robert Matthews
- Milan Caliber 9 (1972) – Commissioner
- When Women Lost Their Tails (1972) – Grr (final film role)

== Television ==
Year	Title	Role	Notes
1959	Rawhide	Holzman	S2:E15, "Incident of the Wanted Painter"

== See also ==
- Franklin Merrell-Wolff (1887–1985), American mystical philosopher
- Francis Wolff (1907–1971), record producer
- Wolff
