= Biancini =

Biancini is an Italian surname. Notable people with the surname include:

- Angelo Biancini (1911–1988), Italian sculptor
- Ferruccio Biancini (1890–1955), Italian film actor, producer, screenwriter and director.
- Isabella Biancini (born 1942), stage name of Thea Fleming, Dutch film actress
