= The Million Dollar Countdown =

1967 film

- Directed by: Mario Caiano
- Written by: Sandro Continenza; Arturo Marcos
- Starring: Frank Wolff; Rossella Como
- Cinematography: Julio Ortas
- Music by: Ángel Oliver
- Release date: 1967

The Million Dollar Countdown (Spanish: El gran golpe de Niza, Italian: Per favore... non sparate col cannone, also known as L'assalto al centro nucleare) is a 1967 Spanish-Italian criminal comedy film directed by Mario Caiano and starring Frank Wolff.

== Cast ==
- Frank Wolff as Brian Kervin
- Rossella Como as Claudine
- Giampiero Albertini as Joe
- Claudio Gora as Proprietario del Yacht
- Gérard Landry as Colonel
- Toni Ucci as Theo
- Thea Fleming as Huguette
- Jesús Puente as Talbol
- Josyane Gibert as Fiamma
- Pippo Starnazza as Zero
- Aldo Bufi Landi
- Amedeo Trilli
