= Cold Eyes of Fear =

- Italian film poster for Cold Eyes of Fear
- Directed by: Enzo G. Castellari
- Screenplay by: Tito Carpi; Enzo G. Castellari
- Story by: Tito Carpi; Enzo G. Castellari
- Produced by: José Frade
- Starring: Giovanna Ralli; Frank Wolff; Fernando Rey; Gianni Garko
- Cinematography: Antonio Lopez Ballesteros
- Edited by: Vincenzo Tomassi
- Music by: Ennio Morricone
- Production companies: Cinemar; Atlántida Films
- Distributed by: Cineraid
- Release dates: 6 April 1971 (Italy); 21 May 1972 (Madrid)
- Running time: 91 minutes
- Countries: Italy; Spain
- Language: Italian
- Box office: ₤197 million

Cold Eyes of Fear (Italian: Gli occhi freddi della paura) is a 1971 Italian Giallo film directed by Enzo G. Castellari, starring Fernando Rey, Giovanna Ralli, Frank Wolff, and Gianni Garko.

== Plot ==
A young playboy (Gianni Garko) picks up an Italian prostitute (Giovanna Ralli) and brings her to his uncle's house for sex. He does not know is that a dangerous convict is lying in wait at the house. He is joined by another criminal trying to avenge himself on the young man's uncle (Fernando Rey), who was the judge who caused him to go to jail. The characters are all trapped together in the house for a very tense night, with Garko trying to figure out how to save himself, while his uncle must avoid a bomb planted at his workplace.

== Cast ==
- Giovanna Ralli as Anna
- Frank Wolff as Arthur Welt
- Fernando Rey as Juez Flower
- Gianni Garko as Peter Flower
- Julián Mateos as Quill
- Karin Schubert as A Nightclub Actress

== Production ==
The film was written by Enzo G. Castellari and Tito Carpi. Although Leo Anchóriz of Spain is credited as a co-writer, he was not in actuality; his name appears solely for co-production laws that were required to establish the film as a dual-nationality production. Capri and Castellari wrote a film based on the idea of the entire film being set in an apartment, an idea influenced by the film Wait Until Dark. Casterllari was also influenced by William Friedkin's The Boys in the Band (1970) and borrowed plot elements from William Wyler's The Desperate Hours (1955). The film was originally intended for foreign audiences so Castellari and Carpi had their script translated into English by actor Frank Wolff's wife Alice.

The film was shot at Cinecittà in Rome and on location in London. Castellari shot the film in sequence. During filming, Alice left Wolff. Wolff committed suicide a few months after production in December 1971 in his hotel room in Rome.

== Release ==
Cold Eyes of Fear was released in Italy on 6 April 1971, where it was distributed by Cineraid. It grossed a total of 197,089,000 lira domestically. It was released in Madrid on 21 May 1972. It was also released as Desperate Moments.

== Reception ==
AllMovie described the film as a "cleverly crafted giallo-thriller", noting that the film appropriates "some of the form's penchant for cool production design and bizarre cinematography (one scene is shot through ice cubes in a glass)" and that a "kinky S&M stage show which, despite occurring at the start of the film, remains its most memorable sequence." The review concluded that "The rest of this loopy Italian-Spanish co-production isn't bad, however, crisply edited by Vincenzo Tomassi (who went on to edit many of Lucio Fulci's most popular horror films) and well scored by Ennio Morricone" Danny Shipka, author of Perverse Titilation a book about European exploitation films stated that the film appeared to be "designed to be a thriller that incorporated some giallo constructs when the subgenre became lucrative." The review concluded that audiences of either thrillers or gialli were probably disappointed with Cold Eyes of Fear and that "there are plenty of action-packed, gore-soaked gialli to watch, but this is not one of them."

== See also ==
- List of Italian films of 1971
- List of Spanish films of 1971
