= Ski Troop Attack =

- Theatrical release poster
- Directed by: Roger Corman
- Written by: Charles B. Griffith
- Produced by: Roger Corman
- Starring: Frank Wolff; Michael Forest
- Cinematography: Andrew M. Costikyan
- Edited by: Anthony Carras
- Music by: Fred Katz
- Distributed by: Filmgroup
- Release date: April 8, 1960
- Running time: 63 minutes
- Country: United States
- Languages: English; German

Ski Troop Attack is a 1960 American war film directed by Roger Corman and starring Michael Forest, Frank Wolff, Richard Sinatra and Wally Campo. Filmgroup released the film as a double feature with Battle of Blood Island (1960).

== Plot ==
In 1944, five American soldiers led by Lt. Factor are skiing on a reconnaissance mission behind enemy lines in Germany's Hürtgen Forest during World War II. Sgt. Potter has ordered the Americans to attack the Germans, to the annoyance of Lt. Factor, who wants the patrol to be for reconnaissance only.

The next morning, the troops see a large German unit with tanks. Factor radios the information and is informed that the Allies are under attack. The patrol encounters some Germans and a fight ensues in which an American is killed. The group find a cabin and order a young woman named Ilse to cook for them. She tries to poison the men's coffee, but Factor stops her. Ilse tries to shoot the soldiers and they kill her.

Factor orders the men to make camp at a nearby cave, where they celebrate Christmas. Factor decides to destroy a railroad trestle vital to the Germans. The men meet resistance from the Germans and a fight begins. The men succeed in destroying the rail line, but Jocko and Herman die.

== Cast ==
- Michael Forest as Lt. Factor
- Frank Wolff as Sgt. Potter
- Wally Campo as Pvt. Ed Ciccola
- Richard Sinatra as Pvt. Herman Grammelsbacher
- Roger Corman appears in an uncredited role as a German soldier entering the cabin
- James Hoffman as German Ski Patrol
- Chan Biggs as German Ski Patrol
- Tom Staley as German Ski Patrol
- David Markie as German Ski Patrol
- Skeeter Boyer as German Ski Patrol
- Wayne Lasher as German Ski Patrol
- Sheila Carol as Ilse Heinsdorf

== Production ==
The script was written by Charles B. Griffith, who had previously worked for Corman. Griffth was inspired in part by the Battle of the Hurtgen Forest.

The film was shot in Deadwood, South Dakota in the Black Hills over ten days. Corman selected the location because he could hire a crew from Chicago for lower rates than he would have paid a Los Angeles-based crew. To consolidate costs, Corman's brother Gene produced another film titled Beast from Haunted Cave at the same time on the same location, and with the same screenwriter and lead actors. The two films took five weeks to shoot, with one day off between films, and Beast from Haunted Cave was shot first.

Michael Forest was paid $500 a week and later recalled that "what was taking place was tough on us physically."

Corman hired ski teams from high schools in Deadwood and Lead but could only film them on weekends and after school. One played the Germans and the other played the Americans. He cast a German ski instructor to play the head of the German ski troop, but the instructor broke his leg two days before the shoot, so Corman played the role himself. He had skied occasionally at college and took a one-day skiing lesson prior to filming. Corman recalled the shoot as "a very tough challenge. It was unbelievably cold and snowed all the time.

The film's musical score, written by cellist Fred Katz, was originally written for A Bucket of Blood. According to Mark Thomas McGee, author of Roger Corman: The Best of the Cheap Acts, each time that Katz was asked to write music for Corman, Katz sold the same score as if it were new music. The score was used in a total of seven films, including The Wasp Woman and Creature from the Haunted Sea.

== Reception ==
Variety liked the action sequences but found the characterization clichéd and the lack of establishing shots to be a weakness.

Monthly Film Bulletin called it "a crude war film which just about gets by when it sticks to action. But the attempts at deeper meaning and characterisaton ends in cliches flying thick and fast."
