= Linné Ahlstrand =

American model and actress (1936–1967)

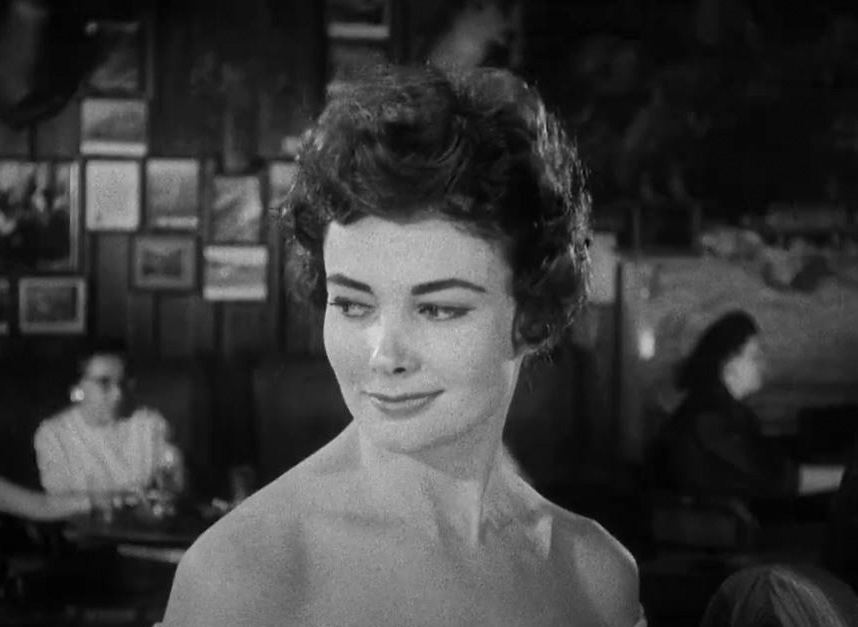
- From Beast from Haunted Cave (1959)

Playboy centerfold appearance
- July 1958
- Preceded by: Judy Lee Tomerlin
- Succeeded by: Myrna Weber

Personal details
- Born: July 1, 1936 Chicago, Illinois, U.S.
- Died: January 18, 1967 (aged 30) Pasadena, California, U.S.
- Height: 5 ft 2 in (1.57 m)

Linné Nanette Ahlstrand (July 1, 1936 – January 18, 1967) was an American model and actress. She was Playboy magazine's Playmate of the Month for its July 1958 issue. Her centerfold was photographed by Frank Bez.

Ahlstrand moved to New York City from Hollywood, California to pursue an acting and modeling career. She appeared in such movies as Living Venus, Beast from Haunted Cave, and in such TV Shows as Highway Patrol, and Johnny Stacatto. She returned to the Los Angeles area in September, 1965, when she got married. Ahlstrand continued to pursue an acting and modeling career before her death to cancer at age 30 in Pasadena, California in 1967.

== Filmography ==
- Senior Prom (1958)
- Living Venus (1961)
- Staccato (1959) as Anona
- Beast from Haunted Cave (1959) as Natalie, the barmaid
- Highway Patrol - "Temptation" (1957), "Slain Cabby" (1957), "Deaf Mute" (1958), "Insulin" (1958), "Mother's March" (1958) as Dispatcher

== See also ==
- List of people in Playboy 1953–1959

Elizabeth Ann Roberts	Cheryl Kubert	Zahra Norbo	Felicia Atkins	Lari Laine	Judy Lee Tomerlin
Linné Ahlstrand	Myrna Weber	Teri Hope	Mara Corday, Pat Sheehan	Joan Staley	Joyce Nizzari
