= Daliah Lavi =

Israeli actress, singer and model (1942–2017)

- דליה לביא
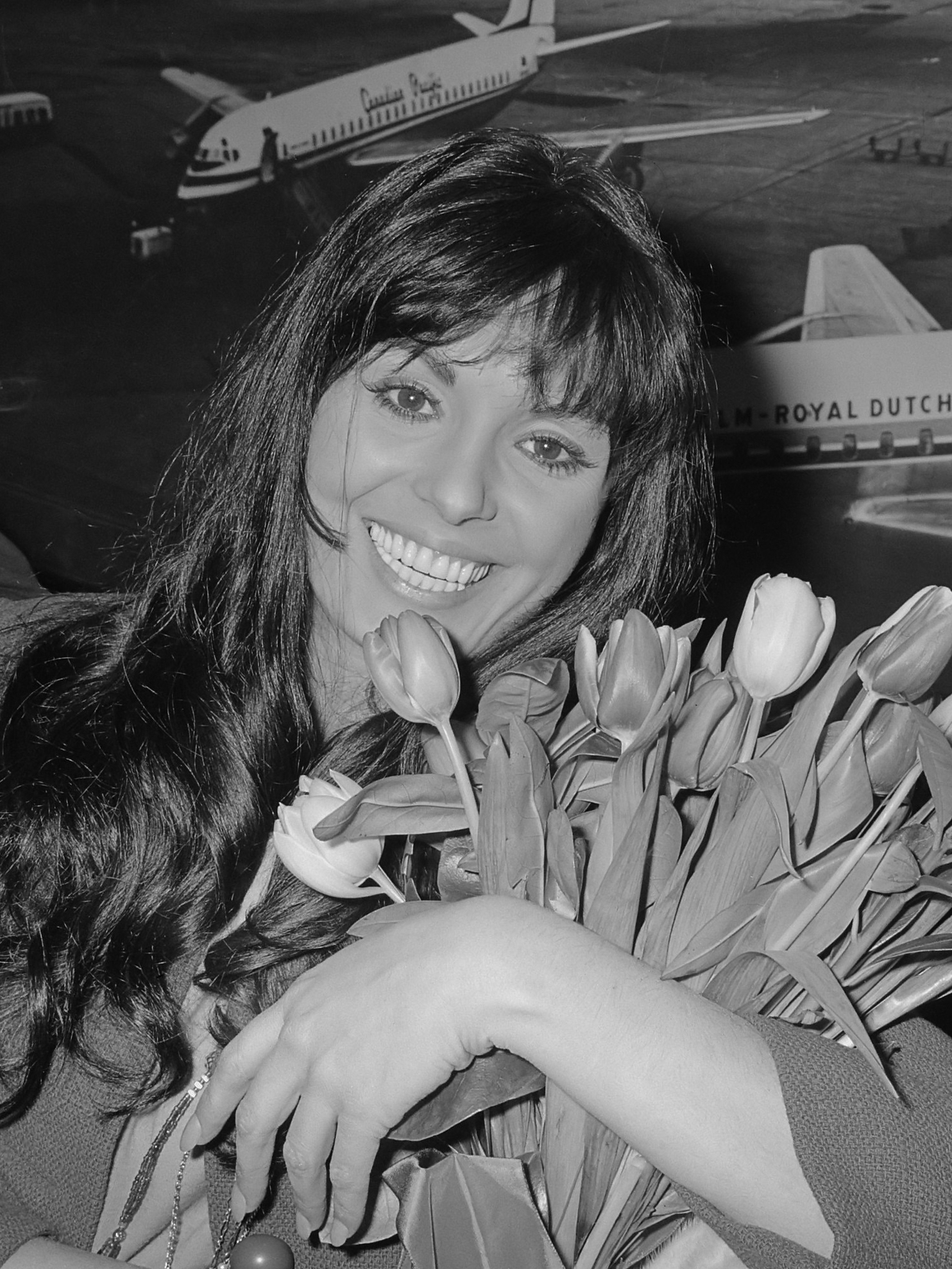
- Lavi in 1966
- Born: Daliah Lewinbuk (or Levenbuch); 12 October 1942; Haifa, Mandatory Palestine
- Died: 3 May 2017 (aged 74); Asheville, North Carolina, U.S.
- Occupations: Actress, singer, model
- Years active: 1955–1994 and 2008–2009
- Spouse: 4; last marriage to Charles Gans (m. 1977)
- Children: 4
- Website: Official website

Daliah Lavi (born Daliah Lewinbuk or Levenbuch, Hebrew: דליה לביא [ˌdalja laˈvi]; 12 October 1942 – 3 May 2017) was an Israeli actress, singer, and model.

== Early life ==
Daliah Lewinbuk (or Levenbuch) was born in Haifa, British Mandate of Palestine (now Israel). Her mother Ruth Klammer was born in Breslau, Germany (now Wrocław, Poland) to Theodor Hermann Klammer and Gertrud Klammer and was German-Jewish. Her father Reuben was born in Belarus to Yosef Lewinbuk and Michla Levine of Russian-Jewish descent. The family surname is Lewinbuk (or Levenbuch).

Daliah met Kirk Douglas when she was 10 years old. Kirk Douglas was in Israel in order to film The Juggler. Daliah told him that she would like to be a dancer. Douglas helped persuade her parents to send her to Stockholm, Sweden to study ballet. Daliah was not suited to the climate. Daliah gave up dancing, and she returned to Israel in order to be a model. A cheesecake photo of Daliah Lavi, while she was adjusting her bikini after it broke while at a Rio de Janeiro swimming pool, was circulated widely by the Associated Press in 1959.

She performed her national service as a goodwill ambassador. Daliah appeared in several more films, Daliah was spotted on a beach during a trip to Rome. Daliah was offered a role in Two Weeks in Another Town, reuniting her with Douglas.

== Career ==
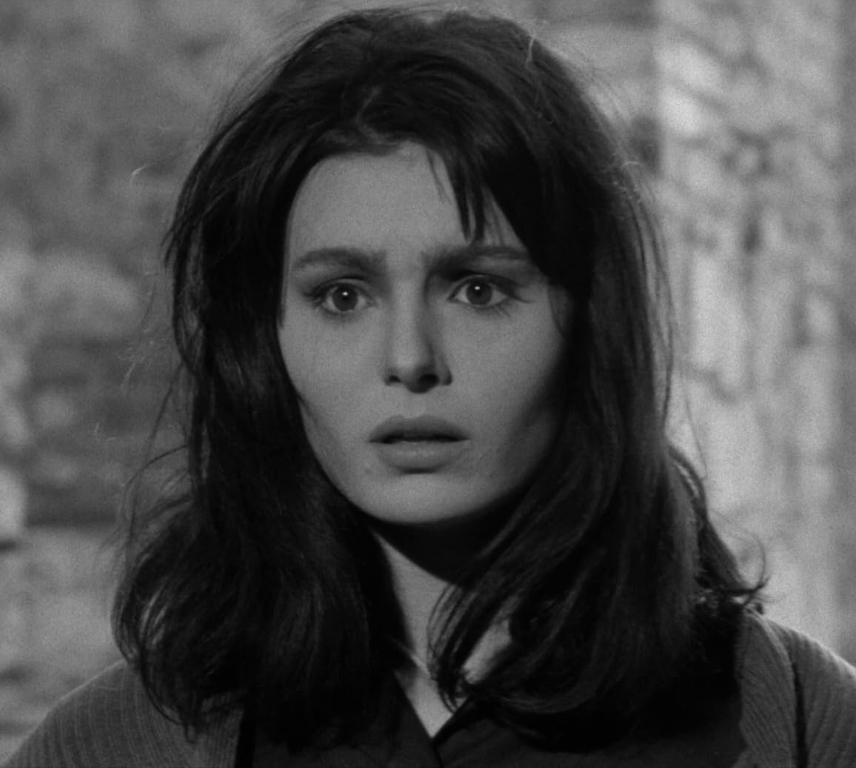
Lavi in The Demon, 1963

In 1955, Lavi appeared in her first film, Hemsöborna, a Swedish adaptation of August Strindberg's 1887 novel The People of Hemsö. She eventually returned to Israel. Her career took off in 1960 when she started appearing in numerous European and American productions. Daliah was fluent in several languages; she acted in German, French, Italian, Spanish and English. Lavi was reunited with Douglas in her first American film, Vincente Minnelli's Two Weeks in Another Town (1962).

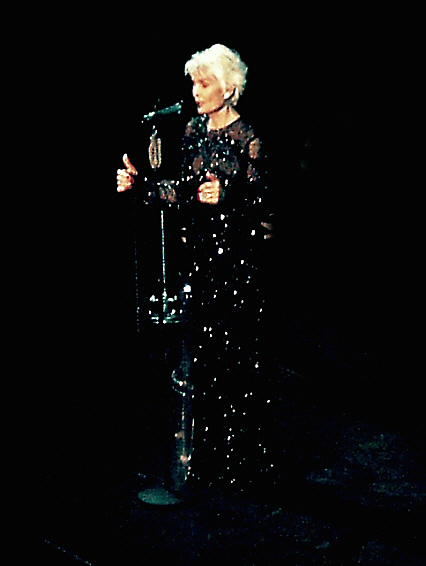
Lavi in Leipzig, Germany in 2009

She appeared in Brunello Rondi's witch hunt-themed movie The Demon (1963), which she considered her best performance. She also appeared in Mario Bava's Gothic classic La Frusta e il corpo (1963), and the first Matt Helm film, The Silencers (1966) opposite Dean Martin. Her portrayal of The Girl, Peter O'Toole's love interest, in 1965's Lord Jim, was to have been her breakout American role. However, the tepid reaction of audiences prompted Lavi to accept a new career path.

Lavi frequently played a scantily clad or partly nude femme fatale, but one nude scene was mainly done by a body double. In 1964, the French comedy The Troops of St. Tropez had recently opened; this featured nudism and also premiered in Croatia where the Western Old Shatterhand (film) was made by West German producers at the Krka National Park waterfalls. The second part of a skinny-dipping scene at the falls was made with Lavi during the summer, but the initial jump from the falls (filmed later in the year at low water levels for safety) used a local look-alike when Lavi became ill. The stand-in, Gordana Ceko, climbed over slippery rocks and jumped into the cold water.

Lavi played European entertainer Ilona Bergen in the 1965 mystery Ten Little Indians, an adaptation of Agatha Christie's thriller. She also acted as "The Detainer/007" in Casino Royale (1967).

In 1970, she was discovered by record producer Jimmy Bowien and began a successful schlager singing career in Germany. Some of her biggest hits were "Oh Wann Kommst Du" (composed by John Kongos), "Willst Du Mit Mir Gehn" (Kongos), and "C'est ça, la vie (So ist das Leben)". In August 1971, Daliah's single "Jerusalem" peaked at number 98 in Australia.

== Death ==
Lavi died on 3 May 2017, aged 74, from undisclosed causes in Asheville, North Carolina, US. Her funeral and burial were in Israel.

== Filmography ==
- The People of Hemsö (1955) as Professor's Daughter
- Burning Sands (1960)
- Candide ou l'optimisme au XXe siècle (1960) as Cunégonde
- Un soir sur la plage (1961) as Marie
- La Fête espagnole (1961) as Nathalie Conrad
- Three Faces of Sin (1961) (uncredited)
- The Return of Doctor Mabuse (1961) as Maria Sabrehm
- The Game of Truth (1961) as Gisèle
- Two Weeks in Another Town (1962) as Veronica
- Black-White-Red Four Poster (1962) as Germaine
- The Demon (1963) as Purif
- The Whip and the Body (1963) as Nevenka Menliff
- And So to Bed (1963) as Secretary
- Old Shatterhand (1964) as Paloma
- Cyrano and d'Artagnan (1964) as Marion de l'Orme
- DM-Killer (1965) as Lolita, Charlys Stiefschwester
- Lord Jim (1965) as The Girl
- La Celestina P... R... (1965) as Daniela
- Shots in Threequarter Time (1965) as Irina Badoni
- Ten Little Indians (1965) as Ilona Bergen
- The Silencers (1966) as Tina
- The Spy with a Cold Nose (1966) as Princess Natasha Romanova
- Casino Royale (1967) as The Detainer / James Bond
- Jules Verne's Rocket to the Moon (1967) as Madelaine
- Nobody Runs Forever (1968) as Maria Cholon
- Some Girls Do (1969) as Helga
- Catlow (1971) as Rosita
- Mrs. Harris und der Heiratsschwindler (1991) as Jill Howard

== Discography ==
- Liebeslied Jener Sommernacht (1970) German / English
- Daliah (1970) English
- Daliah Lavi / In Liebe (1971) German
- Sympathy (1971) English
- Willst Du Mit Mir Geh'n (1971) German
- Would You Follow Me (1971) English
- Ich Bin Dein Freund (1972) German
- Jerusalem (1972) English
- Meine Art Liebe Zu Zeigen (1972) German / English
- Let The Love Grow (1973) English
- I'm Israeli, I'm A Sabra (1974) Hebrew
- Für Große Und Kleine Kinder (1975) German
- Cafe Decadence (1975) German
- Neuer Wind (1976) German
- Bei Dir Bin Ich Immer Noch Zuhaus (1978) German
- ... Wenn Schon, Dann Intensiv (1983) German
- Herzblut (1985) German
