= The Demon (1963 film) =

- Italian film poster
- Directed by: Brunello Rondi
- Screenplay by: Ugo Guerra; Luciano Martino; Brunello Rondi
- Story by: Brunello Rondi
- Produced by: Ugo Guerra; Federico Magnaghi; Luciano Martino
- Starring: Daliah Lavi; Frank Wolff
- Cinematography: Carlo Bellero
- Edited by: Mario Serandrei
- Music by: Piero Piccioni
- Production companies: Titanus; Vox Film; Les Films Marceau; Cocinor
- Distributed by: Titanus (Italy); Cocinor (France)
- Release date: 27 August 1963 (Venice)
- Countries: Italy; France
- Language: Italian

The Demon (Italian: Il demonio, lit. 'The devil') is a 1963 Italian drama-horror film co-written and directed by Brunello Rondi. The film premiered at the 24th Venice International Film Festival.

== Plot ==
Purificazione, commonly known as "Purif", is a lonely, uninhibited young woman and folk magic practitioner living in a small village of Lucania, where she is treated as a pariah by the locals. Purif has an unhealthy obsession with Antonio, an engaged man, and makes desperate, inappropriate attempts to court him. Though attracted to Purif, Antonio denies her. On one occasion, she tricks Antonio into drinking wine laced with her blood, and then claims he is cursed to die. She continues to stalk Antonio, and watches his wedding procession from a distance, but goes into a rage outside the cathedral.

While Antonio and his wife prepare to consummate the marriage, Purif attempts to place another curse outside the house using a dead cat, but is chased away by villagers who are monitoring at Antonio's behest. She flees outside of the town, and is met by a sheep herder who binds her arms and legs before raping her. The following morning, while bathing in a creek, Purif is greeted by Salvatore, an adolescent boy who has apparently recovered from a long illness. Shortly after having this encounter, she learns that Salvatore is on his deathbed, and that a priest has read him his last rites.

Purif goes to Salvatore's home, where she finds the boy has just died, surrounded by family members. They accuse her of being a witch, and she is taken away by Father Tommaso. Purif, claiming she has spoken to Satan and is cursed due to her practice of witchcraft, is subsequently placed in the care of Zio Giuseppe, a local charlatan whom Purif's family believes can cleanse her soul; however, Giuseppe merely exploits the situation, using it as an opportunity to sexually violate Purif. After leaving Giuseppe's, she encounters Antonio plowing a field. She pleads with him, but he aggressively denies her, pushing her onto the ground and threatening her.

That night, Purif awakens in her bed with no control of her body, experiencing apparent demonic possession. The local parish attempts to identify the demon and exorcise her, to no success. The villagers begin to harass Purif, attempting to burn her alive. Her parents dig a hole on their property and create a makeshift bedroom for her, which they cover with wood planks and soil to keep her hidden from the locals. However, when Antonio arrives and calls out her name, Purif begins to respond, leading to the villagers discovering her hiding place.

Purif flees, and begins walking aimlessly near a convent, where nuns witness her hugging a tree. The nuns decide to help her, but Purif attempts to strangle one of them when she recites the trinitarian formula. Meanwhile, Antonio begins to exhibit welts on his body, apparently from her curse. He seeks help from Giuseppe, who instructs him to create a bonfire in the center of town using old-growth wood, which Giuseppe claims will rid the village of Purif. In the midst of the bonfire, in which the other villagers are participating, Antonio is met by Purif, who leads him away. The two fall to the ground and engage in sex. At dawn, Antonio awakens and stabs Purif to death.

== Cast ==
- Daliah Lavi as Purif
- Frank Wolff as Antonio
- Dario Dolci as Father Don Tommaso
- Nicola Tagliacozzo as Uncle Giuseppe
- Anna María Aveta as Sister Angela
- Rossana Rovere as Antonio's Wife

== Production ==
The film was shot in Matera, Montescaglioso and Miglionico in the Italian region of Basilicata (also known as Lucania). It was Rondi's first solo directorial feature film. Anthropologist Ernesto De Martino, who documented the rural customs and beliefs of Southern Italy, served as a script consultant. De Martino's contribution is acknowledged in the opening credits.

== Reception ==
The film was panned by critics upon its release, accused of blasphemy and obscenity. An exception was Edoardo Bruno who praised the film for its criticism against social conformity and cited it as the first example of surrealist cinema in Italy. Despite its showing at the Venice Film Festival, the Italian censor banned the film and described it as "the most offensive film to have been made in recent times."

It has been re-evaluated, receiving positive reviews over the years.

== Legacy ==
Film scholars Keith McDonald and Wayne Johnson cite The Demon as an early progenitor of the folk horror genre due to its themes of superstition and curses, occurring in a pastoral setting.

An emblematic scene where Purif drops into a face-up crawl during an exorcism is often compared to the "spider walk" by a possessed Regan MacNeil in The Exorcist by William Friedkin, released ten years later.

== Accolades ==
Award	Category	Result	Year	Ref
Boston Society of Film Critics Awards	Best Rediscoveries	Won	2015	

== Sources ==
- McDonald, Keith; Johnson, Wayne (2021). Contemporary Gothic and Horror Film: Transnational Perspectives. London, England: Anthem. ISBN 978-1-785-27774-0.
