= Beast from Haunted Cave =

1959 film

- Theatrical release poster
- Directed by: Monte Hellman
- Written by: Charles B. Griffith
- Produced by: Gene Corman
- Starring: Michael Forest; Sheila Noonan; Frank Wolff
- Cinematography: Andrew M. Costikyan
- Edited by: Anthony Carras
- Music by: Alexander Laszlo
- Production companies: Filmgroup; Northern Pictures
- Distributed by: Allied Artists Pictures
- Release date: June 10, 1959
- Running time: 75 minutes
- Country: United States
- Language: English
- Budget: $33,000

Beast from Haunted Cave is a 1959 horror heist film directed by Monte Hellman and starring Michael Forest, Frank Wolff and Richard Sinatra. It was produced by Gene Corman, Roger Corman's brother. Filmed in South Dakota at the same time as Ski Troop Attack, it tells the story of bank robbers fleeing in the snow who run afoul of a giant spider-like monster in a cave that feeds on humans. The film was released on June 10, 1959 in a double feature with The Wasp Woman (1959).

The movie began an association between Roger Corman and Monte Hellman that lasted for fifteen years. Hellman would work on several of Corman's films and he would finance several movies that Hellman would direct.

== Plot ==
A group of criminals, led by ruthless Alexander Ward, hatch a plan to steal gold bars from a bank vault in Deadwood, South Dakota. Ward sends one of his henchmen, Marty Jones, to plant a time bomb in a nearby gold mine. The detonation will occur the next morning and act as a diversion for their heist. Although Marty, accompanied by local barmaid Natalie, succeeds in setting the device, he encounters a huge, hairy beast. It captures Natalie, but Marty escapes. It is later revealed that the beast survives off of the blood of his captives, who eventually experience a slow death. Natalie is only the latest of its many victims.

The next morning, the explosive goes off as planned, and Alex and his gang succeed in stealing gold bars from the bank's vault. Then, led by a local guide named Gil Jackson, they make the trek to a remote cabin, where they hope to be picked up by a plane bound for Canada. Gil is initially unaware of their plans, but he becomes suspicious when he hears reports of the robbery on the radio and then discovers his clients are toting handguns. They reach the cabin without incident but, once there, a violent snowstorm delays the plane's arrival. Alex's "secretary" Gypsy is taken with the young Gil and tells him that Alex plans to kill him once the plane arrives. Thus, Gil and Gypsy split for town.

Marty carries unpleasant memories of the beast. He perpetually senses someone (or something) is watching him. Thus when he reports encountering the beast again, his companions suspect he's becoming delusional. Eventually, however, they are convinced of the beast's existence when they see it attack Alexander's other henchman, Byron. Despite their fear of further attacks, the gang attempt to track down Gil and Gypsy before they reach town. But with the snowstorm approaching, they head for a nearby cave. The weather also forces Gil and Gypsy to take shelter in the same cave. That shelter turns out to be the lair of the beast. In the final struggle, the beast kills the remaining gang members; but before dying, Marty shoots it with a flare gun. Gil and Gypsy are left to watch as the monster burns to death.

== Cast ==
- Michael Forest as Gil Jackson
- Sheila Noonan as Gypsy Boulet
- Frank Wolff as Alexander Ward
- Richard Sinatra as Marty Jones
- Wally Campo as Byron Smith
- Linné Ahlstrand as Natalie, the barmaid
- Chris Robinson as The Beast / The Bartender
- Jaclyn Hellman as Jill Jackson
- Kay Jennings as Small Dove

== Production ==
"I first met Roger through my wife, Barboura Morris, who had acted in some of his movies. I got him to invest $1,000 in a theater company that we put together. Eventually, we were shut down, and Roger said, 'You should take this as a sign to do something else.' He hired me on the spot to direct Beast from Haunted Cave. [and] He paid me $1,000. We didn't have a contract or anything. Just a handshake. And Roger's handshake was better than most people's contracts".

— Monte Hellman about his experience on being hired to direct the film.

=== Development ===
In the mid-1950s, film producer and director Roger Corman, along with his brother and fellow producer Gene Corman, hired then theatre director Hellman to direct a film from a screenplay by Roger Corman regular Griffith.

According to Griffith, Corman was motived by the success of Naked Paradise. He said "Roger said "I want NAKED PARADISE using a gold mine instead of a pineapple plantation. Put it in South Dakota and add a monster." I didn't know how to add a monster to that script, so I had it all wrapped up in a cocoon in a cave just threatening to break loose all the time. I don't know how it happened That became BEAST FROM HAUNTED CAVE. "

Monte Hellman said "what interested me about it was that it really wasn't a monster movie. Roger liked Key Largo very much. I think that was one of his favorite movies. He kept making Key Largo just different versions of it. In this case he added a monster to it."

Both of the Cormans had grown tired of filming in Bronson Canyon and the Los Angeles Arboretum, and wanted to film in new locations in future films. This would also enable them to hire crews out of Chicago at a cheaper rate than in Los Angeles.

After getting information from the Chamber of Commerce in South Dakota, they decided to film in South Dakota's Black Hills The Black Hills themselves turned out to be too difficult to film. Gene Corman considered a mine in Lead, South Dakota, then found a disused mine in Deadwood.

To amortize costs, Roger Corman produced another film, Ski Troop Attack at the same time on the same location, utilising the same screenwriter and lead actors. The two films took five weeks in all the shoot, with one day off between films, and Beast was shot first. The unit was based at the Franklin Hotel.

=== Casting ===
The film's cast was mostly composed of Corman regulars Wolff, Campo, Forest, Sinatra (cousin to famous actor and singer Frank Sinatra) and Noonan. Ahlstrand, Playboy's Playmate of the Month for July 1958, also played a minor role in the film as Nathalie the barmaid. Michael Forest says he was paid $500 a week and recalls "what was taking place was tough on us physically."

=== Shooting ===
Shooting took 13 days. Gene Corman said "this was the first time I had tried to shoot in snow and it was very difficult. But the picture had a whole new look."

Hellman says "it wasn’t fun to make at all. It was my first film and we had 13 days to shoot, and by noon of the first day we hadn’t gotten a shot because the equipment was all frozen – it was 10 degrees below zero and we couldn’t get anything to run... Roger Corman, who was the executive producer, was screaming on the phone that if we didn’t get our first day's quota he was gonna be on a plane the next day and take over the picture. We managed to get it [working]; the sound was a little bit off-speed but we were able to correct it."

Scenes in the cave were filmed in an abandoned mine in Deadwood, where the crew was allowed to film. While shooting scenes in the cave that required the actors to use guns, the sounds reverberating from the fired ammunition would sometimes cause parts of the cave's ceiling to break off, which made some of the cast and crew members nervous while working on location.

Other problems arose while filming in the mine, as the air became very stale to the point where the crew had to pump air into the cave; the problem was never completely solved due to improper equipment.

Special effects maestro Paul Blaisdell claimed in interviews that Roger Corman pleaded with him to design and create the film's monster, but the film's budget was so minuscule, Blaisdell turned him down immediately, saying that Corman didn't even offer him enough money to cover the cost of the materials he would need to build the creature. Blaisdell said he never worked for Roger Corman after that.

The monster in the film was eventually designed and portrayed by actor Chris Robinson, who would later star in General Hospital. Robinson offered to do the job for free if he received on-screen credit for special effects, and even pay for the materials himself.

According to Robinson, the design of the beast, which he nicknamed "Humphrass", was based on a wingless hangingfly. In order to create the creature's skeletal form, Robinson added aluminum stripping to a plywood base, then covered the frame with chicken wire before wrapping it in sheets and muslin. He then soaked the frame in vinyl paint in order to waterproof the design, since it had to be used in the snow. The creature's head was fashioned out of quarter-inch aluminum wire, which was then encased in steel wire and wrapped in muslin. The creature's fangs and teeth were also constructed with aluminum wire. Robinson then placed putty and patches of crepe hair onto the design before adding spun glass and Christmas tree tinsel in order to give it a cobwebby appearance.

"They literally spent two dollars at the dime store", said Hellman. "It was mostly angel hair and paper machie monster."

Forest said, "I kept lookin’ at it and thinking, "This doesn’t scare me at all!" [Laughs] But it was supposed to, I guess Chris was doing the best he could under the circumstances, trying to make this thing walk when he could hardly move in it."

Roger Corman recalls the shoot "as a very tough challenge. It was unbelievably cold and snowed all the time.

Hellman says he was paid to write, edit and direct, but he was unable to edit since he was not in the union, which was IA out of Chicago. He added, "Fools plunge in .. . I just did it, and I probably made more mistakes than the average person who makes a first film. I didn’t really have any help and I wouldn’t take any help. I had to do it on my own. Once I made my first film I considered myself a film-maker. I lost all interest in the theatre and never went back."

=== Proposed sequel ===
A sequel for the film was planned, which would have resolved the fate of the surviving characters, but it was soon canceled, resulting in the film's open ending.

== Release ==
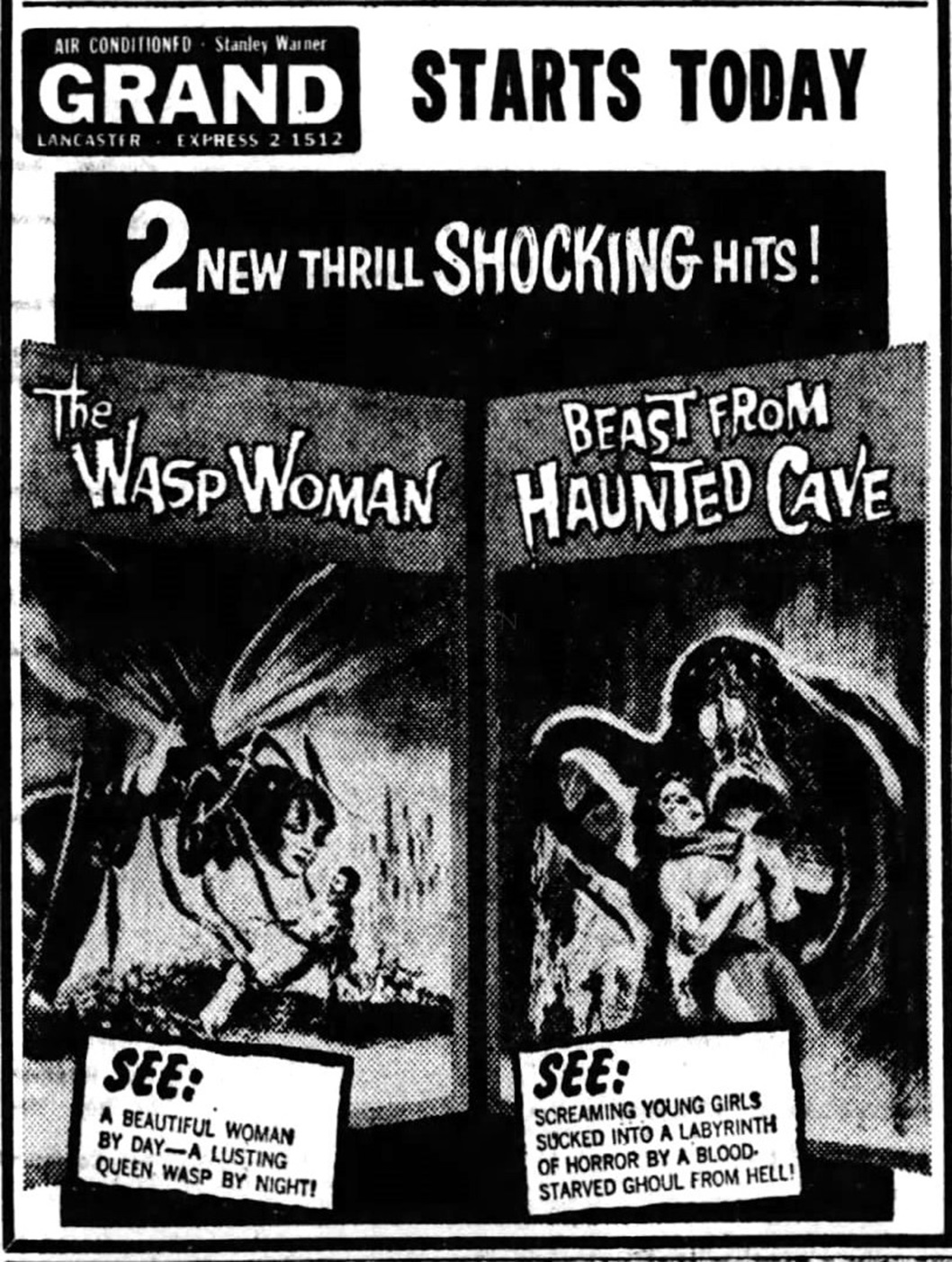
Advertisement from June 10, 1959 for Beast from Haunted Cave and co-feature, The Wasp Woman

The film was released through Filmgroup on June 10, 1959 on a double bill with The Wasp Woman (1959).

=== Box office ===
Hellman claimed to have received 2% of the profits – which he said came to $400 over the next five years.

=== Critical ===
In a contemporary review, the Monthly Film Bulletin noted that despite being "substantially dissimilar to most monster pieces", the film had "few positive virtues". The review also commented on "uneven acting and direction".

Time Out gave the film a negative review, calling it "routine" with "nothing to distinguish it from any other grade Z horror pic of the '50s".

Alan Jones of The Radio Times rated the film two out of five stars, noting what he called the film's "flair and imagination by director Monte Hellman", while also stating that it was "a painless, cost-conscious effort typical of producer Roger Corman". Leonard Maltin awarded the film a mixed 2 out of 4 stars, calling it a remake of Naked Paradise with a monster added in.

Gene Corman would work with Hellman a number of times later on in his career.

== TV version ==
Three years later, Roger Corman asked Hellman to edit four pictures for TV; they had been a little over 60 minutes and he needed them to be 80 minutes for a sale to Allied Artists’ TV. He shot extra scenes for Beast from Haunted Cave, Creature from the Haunted Sea, Last Woman on Earth, and Ski Troop Attack.

"I had fun, I was autonomous, and Corman didn’t care what I shot", Hellman says. "The stock was different; I used whatever actors were still available."

== Home media ==
On March 20, 2001, Beast from Haunted Cave was released for the first time on DVD by Madacy as a part of its "Killer Creatures" double-feature pack alongside The Brain That Wouldn't Die. Madacy would later re-release the film in 2004 as a part of another multi-feature pack. In 2002, a "Special Extended Version" of the film was released by Synapse Video on March 26, followed by an additional release from Alpha Video on October 22. Alpha Video would re-release the film twice in 2003 as a part of multi-feature film packs. The film was re-released on four separate occasions by Platinum Disc in 2005 for various multi-feature film packs, with its final release on September 13 distributed by Genius Entertainment. Over the next several years, the film was re-released several times by different distributors until its final release as a part of a three-disk multi-feature film pack by Echo Bridge Home Entertainment on September 1, 2015.

== Notes ==
- Weaver, Tom (2006). Interviews with B Science Fiction and Horror Movie Makers: Writers, Producers, Directors, Actors, Moguls and Makeup. McFarland. ISBN 9780786428588.
- Albright, Brian (2015). Wild Beyond Belief!: Interviews with Exploitation Filmmakers of the 1960s and 1970s. McFarland. ISBN 9780786482504.
