= Atlas (1961 film) =

1961 film

- Original film poster
- Directed by: Roger Corman
- Written by: Charles B. Griffith
- Produced by: Roger Corman
- Starring: Michael Forest
- Cinematography: Basil Maros
- Edited by: Michael Luciano
- Music by: Ronald Stein
- Production company: Beacon Productions
- Distributed by: The Filmgroup
- Release date: May 1961
- Running time: 79 minutes
- Countries: United States; Greece
- Language: English
- Budget: $108,804.75

Atlas is a 1961 peplum film directed by Roger Corman and starring Michael Forest and Frank Wolff. It was filmed in Greece. Corman called it "my last attempt to do a big picture on a low budget." Writer Charles B. Griffith said "Atlas was a mess. It was a doomed project."

== Plot ==
In the ancient Greek era, King Proximates, a ruthless tyrant, besieges a city for months but struggles to secure victory. Seeking a resolution, he meets Telektos, the besieged city's king, who proposes settling the conflict through a duel between champions. Proximates agrees, demanding ten days to choose his fighter.

Accompanied by the priestess Candia and philosopher Garnis, Proximates travels to the Olympic games to recruit a local champion, Atlas. Unsuccessful in convincing Atlas, he instructs Candia to manipulate the young man. Despite Garnis' jealousy, they secure Atlas for the duel.

The duel takes place in the besieged city's stadium, and Atlas easily defeats the opposing champion. In a strategic move, Proximates orchestrates a fake attack during a banquet, leading to Telektos' unjust execution for alleged involvement. Atlas and Candia attempt to escape to Egypt but are unsuccessful.

A battle ensues between Proximates' army and the rebels, with Atlas leading the charge. Proximates flees on horseback after his forces are decimated. Atlas and the rebels realize the need to eliminate Proximates. In a retaliatory act, Proximates kills Garnis, prompting Atlas to strategize an ambush in a valley.

The rebels successfully ambush Proximates' army, leading to a final battle where Atlas kills the tyrant. In the aftermath, Atlas and Candia depart for Egypt, leaving the conquered city behind.

== Cast ==
- Michael Forest as Atlas
- Barboura Morris as Candia
- Frank Wolff as Praximedes the Tyrant
- Walter Maslow as Garnis
- Andreas Filippides as King Telektos
- Christos Exarchos as Prince Indros
- Theodoros Dimitriou as Gen. Gallus
- Miranda Kounelaki as Arione

== Production ==
=== Development ===
Griffith talks about the origins of the project:

I was involved in an Israeli war picture about helicopters, which never got finished, when Roger decided to make Atlas. This was after Little Shop, and I wanted to make it as Atlas, the Guided Muscle, but Roger wanted to make a Hercules, Italian-type thing. Roger had a deal to shoot it in Puerto Rico, so it was going to be a jungle picture about Atlas and Zeus. Ancient Greece could have jungles, so why not? But I was on my way to Israel because of the helicopter picture that collapsed in the desert. So Roger and I flew to New York together, and we worked on the details of Atlas. Then I boarded a ship going to Israel... I was stranded in Israel for two years, and Roger wouldn't send me the fare to get out. I wound up doing some pictures in Israel.

According to Corman, he was going to England to make a film about Gary Powers' U2 crash called I Flew a Spy Plane Over Russia based on a script by Robert Towne, but says Towne got writer's block after twenty pages. "I decided to leave London because I looked like an idiot," says Corman.

He decided since he was in Europe he might as well make a movie. With the massive international popularity of Hercules, Corman thought he would make his own entry in the sword and sandal genre with a film shot in Greece instead of Italy.

Corman's original plan was for an epic film in wide screen and colour to be released initially on a roadshow circuit by his Filmgroup organisation instead of Filmgroup's usual black and white double features.

Independent producer Vion Papamichelis agreed to put up half the budget, around $40,000. Corman hired Charles Griffith, who was living in Tel Aviv, and gave him four weeks to write the script. Griffith recalls:

Roger called me up from Athens and said he was going to do Atlas there instead of Puerto Rico after all, but I had to rewrite the script completely. So I went to Athens, and he paid me $200 to rewrite it and $50 a week to be associate producer, production manager, action director, do first-aid duty and everything else. He picked up a girl [Barbara Comeau] who did all the other work. She was wardrobe, script girl, and makeup, and she had no experience at all. "Women know how to do makeup," Roger says, "and anybody can do scriptwriting."

Griffith wrote the script in only a few days and said he used the same structure he had employed on Naked Paradise, Beast from the Haunted Cave and Creature from the Haunted Sea. Corman arranged three actors he had made several films with, Barbara Mouris, Michael Forest and Frank Wolff, to come from the US.

Corman's schemes changed when his Greek partner did not come through with the promised funds, a week before filming. Corman says he had invested $20,000 in the project to date. "I decided that, rather than lose the money I'd already invested, I'd compromise," he said. "I'd raise a little more money and shoot the film like I did the old, low-budget westerns. I rememberéd that I had done The Gunslinger in only six days. So, I decided to film Atlas as if it was a low-budget western."

He raised $75,000 and shot it in fifteen days. "The best thing about the film probably was the revisions we did on the script," said Corman. "We felt when we rewrote the script that it would be a great picture. But we ran into problems in shooting around Greece, because of all the ruins."

Corman said they constantly had to add lines explaining the ruins. "At one point, we had Atlas turn to the film's villain, Praximedes, and say ‘Tell me, Praximedes, why is it that your part of the country is in ruins?’ Praximedes smiles and says. ‘We've had constant warfare around here for six hundred years. We've destroyed all our buildings!’"

=== Shooting ===
Corman was led to believe a donation in the right place would ensure 500 Greek soldiers fully costumed and equipped as extras for his massive army. Only 50 turned up, leading Corman to rapidly change his original screenplay to use a smaller group of soldiers.

Griffith said filming "was terrible" and "Frank Wolff and a couple of other actors... were very rebellious. Roger was in a towering rage throughout. There was a Greek cameraman and a Greek crew. Nobody knew left from right. The army couldn't march. They tore the noseguards off their papier-mache helmets, so that their relatives could recognize them in the picture, and there was paper hanging down from their helmets. The tips of their spears were hanging down because they were made out of rubber, which I had to have done at a tire shop around the corner of the set. It was a lot of fun.... Roger broke his sunglasses in half and had a temper tantrum. He went a little mad during that picture. We went off afterwards and got shipwrecked."

Griffith adds, "the Greeks froze the money we brought in, so we couldn't use the cash to shoot the picture. We all had to share hotel rooms, but nobody did any sleeping. They got me cheap at fifty dollars a week."

Corman managed to complete his film, shot in ruins around Athens such as the Parthenon with sequences shot at UCLA with Dick Miller and Roger Corman himself as soldiers. Corman was able to use stock footage from Universal's Sign of the Pagan. Despite these problems, Corman was able to complete the film for US $108,000 rather than the planned $100,000 budget.

== Release ==
In December 1960, Filmgroup announced that they would attempt to book the film into 9,000 theaters, and referred to it as Filmgroup's "first $1,000,000 film."

== Reception ==
Pauline Kael called the film "a yawner. It's hard to believe that Hercules with Steve Reeves could have inspired imitations, but here’s Roger Corman’s quickie version, with earnest, scrawny Michael Forest trying to save the Grecian city of Thenis from the power-mad Praximedes (Frank Wolff, who is occasionally amusing)."

According to Corman, the film "actually made a little money, but it was the same old story of inefficiently doing a giant film. "

== Citation ==
- Corman, Roger (1979). The Movie World of Roger Corman. Chelsea House.
