= Wally Campo =

American actor (1923–2023)

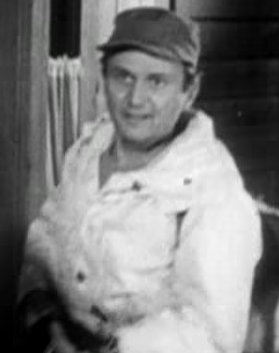
- Campo in Ski Troop Attack (1960)
- Born: Wallace Joseph Campodonico; April 23, 1923; Stockton, California, U.S.
- Died: January 14, 2023 (aged 99); Los Angeles, California, U.S.
- Occupation: Actor
- Years active: 1956–2011 (film and television)
- Spouse: Geraldine Matthews
- Children: 1

Wallace Joseph Campodonico (April 23, 1923 – January 14, 2023), better known as Wally Campo, was an American actor. He was known for his appearances in Roger Corman and Burt Topper films, as well as for narrating The Little Shop of Horrors (1960).

== Life and career ==
Wallace Campodonico was born in Stockton, California on April 23, 1923. He attended Stockton High School, and played the title role in the 1941 senior class production of Tom Cobb or, Fortune's Toy. During World War II, Campodonico served in the U.S. Army, enlisting in June 1942. After the war, he worked as a stage actor. He appeared in a 1948 production of Ah, Wilderness! as part of The Stockton Community Players.

Campo's best known appearance on screen was playing Joe Fink in The Little Shop of Horrors (1960), a detective who visits the shop after catching wind of recent disappearances. The character's persona has been described as a parody of the type of detectives featured in Dragnet. Campo also narrated the film.

In 1969, Campo, then working as an acting coach, made his debut as a director on the film Mark of the Gun, starring Ross Hagen.

Campo and his wife, Geraldine Matthews, had one son, Tony Campodonico, a musician who appeared as a child actor on General Hospital. He later lived in Valley Village, Los Angeles, and died in the Studio City neighborhood of Los Angeles on January 14, 2023, at the age of 99.

== Filmography ==
Year	Title	Role	Reference
1956	Inside Detroit	Recreation Hall Manager	
1958	Machine-Gun Kelly	Maize	
1958	Hell Squad	Private Russo	
1959	Tank Commando	Pvt. Sonny Lazzotti	
1959	Warlock	Barber	
1959	Beast from Haunted Cave	Byron Smith	
1960	Ski Troop Attack	Pvt. Ed Ciccola	
1960	The Little Shop of Horrors	Sgt. Joe Fink / Narrator	
1961	Master of the World	First Mate Turner	
1961	War Is Hell	Laney	
1962	Tales of Terror	Barman Wilkins	
1963	Shock Corridor		
1964	The Strangler	Eggerton	
1967	Devil's Angels	Grog	
