= Michael Forest =

American actor (1929–2026)

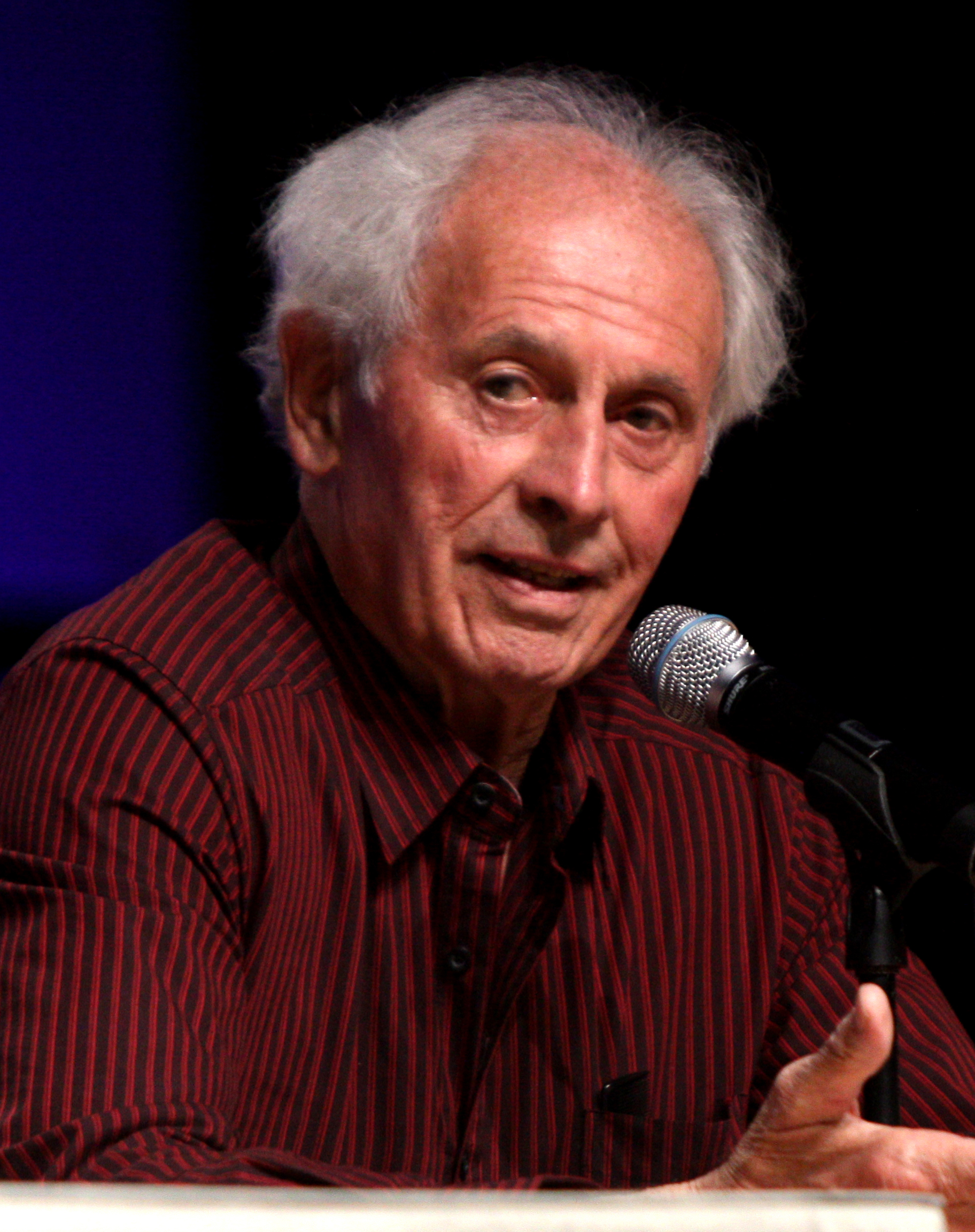
- Forest in 2013
- Born: Gerald Michael Charlebois; April 17, 1929; Harvey, North Dakota, U.S.
- Died: October 14, 2026 (aged 97); Sparks, Nevada, U.S.
- Other names: Mike Forest; Alfred Thor; Russell Thor
- Education: San Jose State University B.A
- Occupation: Actor
- Years active: 1953–2020
- Spouse: Diana Hale (m. 1970; died 2022)
- Website: www.timem.com/starwebs/michaelforest/

Gerald Michael Charlebois (April 17, 1929 – October 14, 2026), better known as Michael Forest, was an American actor who provided the voices for many animated titles, and played the god Apollo on Star Trek.

== Early life ==
Forest was born in Harvey, North Dakota, on April 17, 1929, to Ernest Francis Charlebois (1894–1948) and Mary Elizabeth Charlebois (née Duffy, 1903–1971). He moved with his family at a very early age to Seattle, Washington. He graduated with a B.A. in English and Drama from San Jose State University.

== Career ==
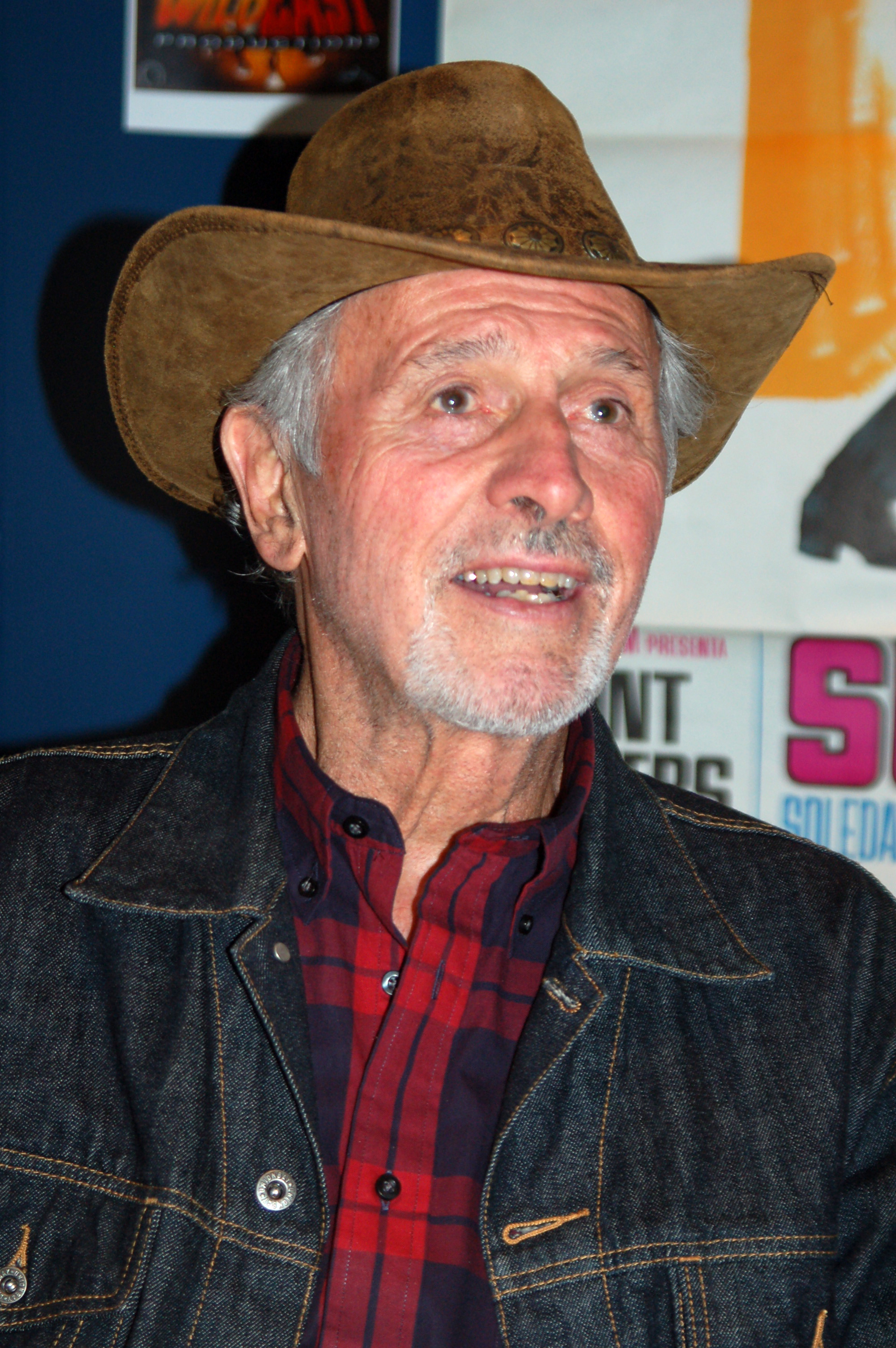
Forest in March 2011

At age 71, Forest voiced Prince Olympius in Power Rangers Lightspeed Rescue. In his earlier years, he was a film and television actor, notably playing in the "Black Leather Jackets" episode of Twilight Zone, and Apollo in the 1967 Star Trek episode "Who Mourns for Adonais?" He again played that role in the Star Trek Continues episode "Pilgrim of Eternity", almost 46 years later, with his wife, actress Diana Hale. He also appeared as a priest in a case of mistaken identity on a 1964 episode of The Dick Van Dyke Show and as one of three alien brothers from another planet in the 1964 Twilight Zone episode, "Black Leather Jackets".

== Personal life and death ==
Forest was married to Diana Hale, an actress, acting coach, and theatre teacher, for over fifty years. The couple married in 1970 and remained together until Hale's death in 2022.

Forest died at a seniors facility in Sparks, Nevada, on October 14, 2026, at the age of 97.

== Filmography ==
=== Anime ===
- Aika R-16: Virgin Mission – Gozo Aida, Tsukino (Ep. 2)
- Armitage III – Vice-Minister Jessup
- The Big O – Alex Rosewater
- Black Jack – Dr. Stanfield, Ernesto
- Blade of the Immortal – Asana, Takayuki Asano
- Carried by the Wind: Tsukikage Ran – Sneaky Spider Saizo
- Casshan: Robot Hunter – Adm. Rudolph
- Crying Freeman – Don Carleone, Shudo Shimazaki
- Cybuster – Ryuzo
- Daphne in the Brilliant Blue – Ishiyama (Ep. 1), Martin, Sho Mizuki
- Dirty Pair Flight 005 Conspiracy – Dietrch (Streamline Dub)
- Doomed Megalopolis – Eiichi Subasawa (Streamline Dub)
- El-Hazard – Yuba Yarius
- Eureka Seven – Braya
- Gad Guard – Dorgel, Dove, Editor
- Gatchaman – Chief
- Ghost in the Shell: Stand Alone Complex – Kubota
- Ghost Slayers Ayashi – Doi-Oiokami-Toshitsura, Master (Ep. 21)
- Giant Robo – Narrator (Animaze Dub)
- Gungrave – Sid Galarde
- Gun Sword – Jose
- Heat Guy J – Valter Yulgence
- Immortal Grand Prix – Hans
- I'll CKBC – Mr. Hiiragi
- Kamichu! – Mr. Gen (Ep. 9)
- Last Exile – Emperor of Anatoray
- Mars Daybreak – EF Commander
- Megazone 23 – Eigen Yumekanou (Part 1, Streamline Dub)
- The Melancholy of Haruhi Suzumiya – Arakawa
- Mermaid Forest – Dr. Shiina (Ep. 4–5), Kohakura
- Mirage of Blaze – Kojyuro Katakura
- Mobile Suit Gundam – The Movie Trilogy – Captain Paolo
- Mobile Suit Gundam 0080: War in the Pocket – Charlie
- Mobile Suit Gundam 0083: Stardust Memory – Captain Dry
- Mobile Suit Gundam: The 08th MS Team – Lt. Col. Kojima
- Moribito: Guardian of the Spirit – Blacksmith
- Nadia: The Secret of Blue Water – Cpt. Mayville
- Orguss 02 – Zante
- Planetes – Clifford, Harry Roland, Norman
- R.O.D the TV – Bookstore Owner B
- Samurai Champloo – Inuyama
- Scrapped Princess – King Balteric
- Serial Experiments Lain – Dr. Hodgeson
- Someday's Dreamers – Councilor Rikiya Furusaki, Kazuki
- Street Fighter II V – Captain Dorai (Animaze Dub)
- Teknoman – Commander Jamison
- Trigun – Lurald
- The Twelve Kingdoms – King Hou Chuutatsu
- Witch Hunter Robin – Inquisitor Cortion
- Zillion – Gord

=== Film ===
- 100 Rifles – Humara
- A House is Not a Home – Bernie
- Akira – Council Member (Pioneer Dub)
- Appleseed – Elder (Animaze Dub)
- Armitage III – Dual Matrix – Ohara
- Atlas – Atlas
- Beast from Haunted Cave – Gil Jackson
- Black Jack the Movie – Roger Siegel
- Body of Evidence – Andrew Marsh
- Cast Away – Pilot Jack
- Catnapped! – Suttoboke
- The Castle of Cagliostro – Additional Voices
- Cowboy Bebop: The Movie – Ticket
- The Glory Guys – Fred Cushman
- Deathwatch – Greeneyes
- Golgo 13: The Professional – E. Young
- King Kong Lives – Vance
- Lensman – Adm. Haines
- The Mystery of Mamo – Agent Gordon (Streamline Dub)
- Mobile Suit Gundam F91 – Theo Fairchild
- The Message – Khalid bin Walid
- Naruto the Movie: Guardians of the Crescent Moon Kingdom – Kakeru Tsuki
- Paprika – Doctor Seijiro Inui
- Redline – Inuki
- Royal Space Force: The Wings of Honneamise – Dr. Gnomm
- Saga of the Viking Women
- Unbelievable!!!!! – Himself
- The Shark – Don
- The Shark Hunter – Donavan
- Ski Troop Attack – Lt. Factor
- The Scarlet Worm – Judge Hanchett
- X-Men: Apocalypse – Apollo (footage from Who Mourns for Adonais?)
- WXIII: Patlabor the Movie 3 – Detective Takeshi Kusumi (as Alfred Thor)

=== Video games ===
- Dynasty Warriors 4 – Huang Gai
- Jade Cocoon: Story of the Tamamayu – Gi
- Seven Samurai 20XX – Yagyu

=== Live-action ===
- Adventures in Voice Acting - Himself
- Masked Rider - Lavasect (voice; credited as Alfred Thor)
- Power Rangers Lightspeed Rescue – Olympius (voice)

=== Television ===
- Laramie – Cobey
- Death Valley Days – Larry Brooks
- Tombstone Territory – Floyd Rank
- The Adventures of Rin Tin Tin – A Brave
- The Adventures of Wild Bill Hickok – Strong Eagle
- Zorro – Anastacio
- Bat Masterson – "The Desert Ship" as Les Wilkins
- Have Gun – Will Travel – Peter Keystone
- Yancy Derringer – Pierre (E15, "The Fair Freebooter")
- The Rifleman – Chaqua
- Wagon Train – Dallas
- The Dick Van Dyke Show – Father Joe Coogan
- The Outer Limits – "It Crawled Out of the Woodwork" – Stuart Peters
- The Man from U.N.C.L.E. – Lt. Fest (S01E14, "The Terbuf Affair")
- Gilligan's Island – Ugundi
- Perry Mason – Pierre Dubois
- Star Trek – Apollo (S02E02 – "Who Mourns for Adonais?")
- It Takes a Thief pilot episode, "A Thief is a Thief" – Courier
- Get Smart – Basil
- One Step Beyond – "Encounter" – Jacques Boutier
- The Twilight Zone – "Black Leather Jackets" – Steve
- Gunsmoke "The Cousin" – Chance; "Innocence" – Bob Sullins; "The Lady" – Ray Pate
- Combat! "Hills Are for Heroes" – Captain, Company Commander
- As the World Turns – Nick Andropoulos
- Cheyenne "Renegades" – Yellow Lance & "Wagon-Tongue North" – Lariat Sanga
- Cross Purpose – Captain Robert Holman
- The Virginian (S04E10, airdate November 24, 1965, "Beyond the Border")
- Rawhide – Yuma
- Bonanza – Young Wolf / Frank Shirmer / Wabuska (3 episodes, 1959–1967)
- Gomer Pyle USMC "The Star Witness" – Fred Cummins

=== Web series ===
- Star Trek Continues – Apollo ("Pilgrim of Eternity")
