= Thea Fleming =

Dutch film actress

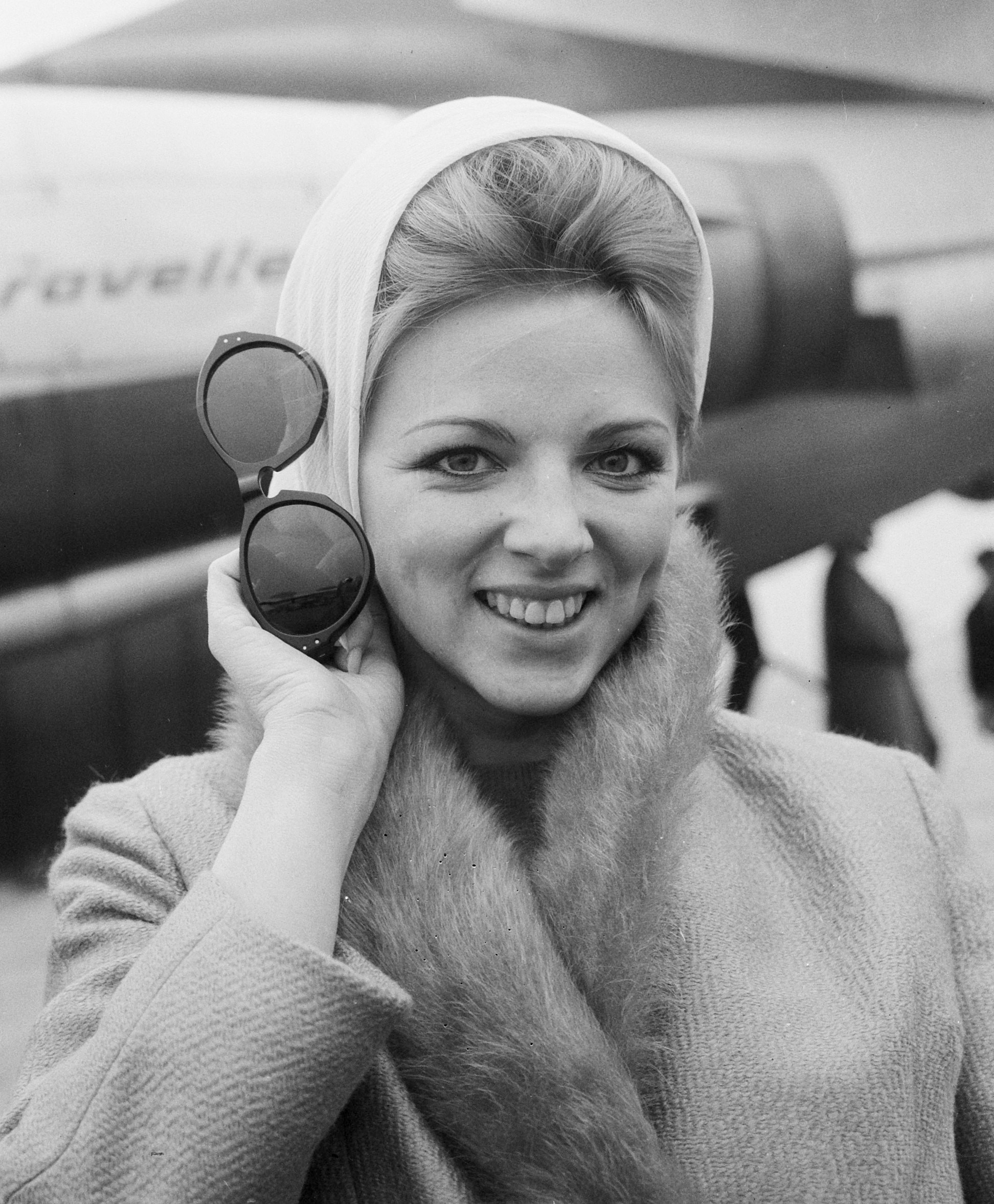
- Flemming in 1965
- Born: Thea Catharina Wihelmina Gemma Pfennings; 1942 (age 83–84); Sittard, the Netherlands
- Occupations: Actress, model

Thea Fleming (also Flemming; born 1942 in Sittard) is a Dutch film actress who spent much of her career in Italy, sometimes credited as Isabella Biancini. She started her career in 1960 as the Dutch Brigitte Bardot. Besides her career as an actress and photo model she also starred in and directed several fotonovelas.

Fleming has a brother in the Netherlands.

== Selected filmography ==
- 1960 From a Roman Balcony (uncredited)
- 1961 Letto a tre piazze – Thea (uncredited)
- 1961 Mariti a congresso
- 1963 I mostri – Marilina street walker (segment "Vernissage", uncredited)
- 1963 Il Successo
- 1963 Taur, il re della forza bruta – Illa
- 1964 I marziani hanno 12 mani
- 1965 Operation Counterspy
- 1965 Salome '73
- 1966 Our Man in Casablanca – Ingrid van Heufen
- 1966 Mondo pazzo... gente matta! – Anna (Maurizio's fiancée)
- 1967 The Million Dollar Countdown – Huguette
- 1969 Kill Rommel! -Woman auxiliary
- 1972 Come fu che Masuccio Salernitano, fuggendo con le brache in mano, riuscì a conservarlo sano

== External sources ==
- Thea Fleming at IMDb
