= List of Showtime original programming =

Showtime (also branded as Paramount+ with Showtime) is an American premium cable and satellite television network. Showtime's programming primarily includes theatrically released motion pictures and original television series, along with boxing and mixed martial arts matches, occasional stand-up comedy specials and made-for-TV movies.

== Current programming ==
=== Drama ===
Title	Genre	Premiere	Seasons	Runtime	Status
Yellowjackets	Drama	November 14, 2021	4 seasons, 39 episodes	52–61 min	Final season ongoing
Dexter: Resurrection	Crime drama	July 13, 2025	2 seasons, 20 episodes	47–66 min	Season 2 ongoing

=== Unscripted ===
==== Docuseries ====
Title	Subject	Premiere	Seasons	Runtime	Status
Couples Therapy	Romantic relationships	September 6, 2019	5 seasons, 64 episodes	25–59 min	Pending

=== Co-productions ===
These shows have been commissioned by Showtime in cooperation with a partner from another country.

Title	Genre	Partner/Country	Premiere	Seasons	Length	Status
Dreaming Whilst Black	Comedy	BBC Three/United Kingdom	September 10, 2023	2 seasons, 12 episodes	22–27 min	Pending

=== SkyShowtime regional original programming ===
These shows are originals because Showtime commissioned or acquired them and had their premiere on the SkyShowtime service, but they are not available worldwide.

Title	Genre	Premiere	Seasons	Runtime	Exclusive region(s)	Language	Status
Veronika	Crime drama	March 22, 2024	3 seasons, 20 episodes	37–48 min	Nordic countries	Swedish	Pending
Shades	Psychological thriller	June 5, 2025	1 season, 8 episodes	33–49 min	Europe	Spanish	Pending
Nails	Comedy	October 6, 2025	1 season, 8 episodes	26–33 min	Europe	Spanish	Pending
Where the Sun Always Shines	Comedy drama	November 10, 2025	1 season, 6 episodes	30–38 min	Europe	Swedish	Renewed
The Tribute	Crime thriller	April 23, 2026	1 season, 8 episodes	33–43 min	Europe	Spanish	Pending
Morpheus	Crime thriller	June 2, 2026	1 season, 7 episodes	46–63 min	Europe	Polish	Pending
Pionek	Crime drama	September 10, 2026	1 season, 6 episodes	41–48 min	Europe	Polish	Pending

=== Adult ===
- AVN Awards (2009)

== Upcoming programming ==
=== SkyShowtime regional original programming ===
These shows are originals because Showtime commissioned or acquired them and will have their premiere on the SkyShowtime service, but they will not be available worldwide.

Title	Genre	Premiere	Seasons	Runtime	Exclusive region(s)	Language	Status
Genialna M. (Note: Co-production with Polsat.)	Crime comedy drama	December 2026	TBA	TBA	Polish	Post-production	
Hidden Islands	Animated children's adventure	2026	1 season, 20 episodes	7 min	Europe	English	In production
Death in Llanes	Crime drama miniseries	TBA	6 episodes	TBA	Europe	Spanish	Filming
National Homicide Unit	Crime drama	TBA	1 season, 8 episodes	TBA	Europe	Swedish	Filming

=== In development ===
- Moneyland

== Former programming ==
The following is a list of Showtime original programs that have appeared on the channel in the past.

=== Drama ===
Title	First broadcast	Last broadcast	Seasons
A New Day in Eden	1982	1983	1 season, 66 episodes
The Paper Chase	1983	1986	4 seasons, 59 episodes
Bedtime	1996	1996	1 season, 13 episodes
Poltergeist: The Legacy	1996	1998 (Note: Moved to Sci-Fi Channel)	4 seasons, 87 episodes
Fast Track	1997	1998	1 season, 22 episodes
Stargate SG-1	1997	2002	10 seasons, 214 episodes
The Hoop Life	1999	2000	1 season, 22 episodes
Queer as Folk	2000	2005	5 seasons, 83 episodes
Resurrection Blvd.	2000	2002	3 seasons, 53 episodes
Soul Food	2000	2004	5 seasons, 74 episodes
Leap Years	2001	2002	1 season, 20 episodes
Jeremiah	2002	2004	2 seasons, 35 episodes
Street Time	2002	2003	2 seasons, 33 episodes
The L Word	2004	2009	6 seasons, 71 episodes
Sleeper Cell	2005	2006	2 seasons, 18 episodes
Brotherhood	2006	2008	3 seasons, 29 episodes
Dexter	2006	2013	8 seasons, 96 episodes
Look: The Series	2010	2010	1 season, 11 episodes
Homeland	2011	2020	8 seasons, 96 episodes
Shameless	2011	2021	11 seasons, 134 episodes
Masters of Sex	2013	2016	4 seasons, 46 episodes
Ray Donovan	2013	2022	7 seasons, 82 episodes
The Affair	2014	2019	5 seasons, 53 episodes
Billions	2016	2023	7 seasons, 84 episodes
Roadies	2016	2016	1 season, 10 episodes
I'm Dying Up Here	2017	2018	2 seasons, 20 episodes
The Chi	2018	2026	8 seasons, 88 episodes
City on a Hill	2019	2022	3 seasons, 26 episodes
The L Word: Generation Q	2019	2023	3 seasons, 28 episodes
Penny Dreadful: City of Angels	2020	2020	1 season, 10 episodes
Your Honor	2020	2023	2 seasons, 20 episodes
American Rust	2021	2021 (Note: Moved to Amazon Freevee)	1 season, 9 episodes
The First Lady	2022	2022	1 season, 10 episodes
The Man Who Fell to Earth	2022	2022	1 season, 10 episodes
American Gigolo	2022	2022	1 season, 8 episodes
Let the Right One In	2022	2022	1 season, 10 episodes
Dexter: Original Sin	2024	2025	1 season, 10 episodes
The Agency: Central Intelligence	2024	2025 (Note: Moved to Paramount+)	1 season, 10 episodes

=== Comedy ===
Title	First broadcast	Last broadcast
Steambath	1983	1983
Brothers	1984	1989
The Frantics: 4 on the Floor	1986	1986
It's Garry Shandling's Show	1986	1990
Hard Knocks	1987	1987
Kids-TV	1990	1993
Mrs. Piggle-Wiggle	1994	2000
Sherman Oaks	1995	1997
Twisted Puppet Theatre	1996	1996
Linc's	1998	2000
Rude Awakening	1998	2001
Beggars and Choosers	1999	2000
The Chris Isaak Show	2001	2004
Engine Trouble	2001	2001
Going to California	2001	2002
Dead Like Me	2003	2004
Huff	2004	2006
Barbershop: The Series	2005	2005
Fat Actress	2005	2005
Weeds	2005	2012
The Underground	2006	2006
Californication	2007	2014
Tracey Ullman's State of the Union	2008	2010
Nurse Jackie	2009	2015
United States of Tara	2009	2011
The Big C	2010	2013
Web Therapy	2011	2015
House of Lies	2012	2016
Reality Show	2012	2012
Happyish	2015	2015
Dice	2016	2017
SMILF	2017	2019
White Famous	2017	2017
Kidding	2018	2020
Who Is America?	2018	2018
Black Monday	2019	2021
On Becoming a God in Central Florida	2019	2019
Work in Progress	2019	2021
Moonbase 8	2020	2020
Flatbush Misdemeanors	2021	2022
I Love That for You	2022	2022
The Curse	2023	2024

=== Miniseries ===
Title	Broadcast
Out of Order	2003
Twin Peaks: The Return	2017
Escape at Dannemora	2018
The Loudest Voice	2019
The Comey Rule	2020
The Good Lord Bird	2020
Dexter: New Blood	2021–2022
George & Tammy	2022–2023
Waco: The Aftermath	2023
Ghosts of Beirut	2023
Fellow Travelers	2023

=== Anthology ===
Title	First broadcast	Last broadcast
Faerie Tale Theatre	1982	1988
Fractured Flickers	1982	1983
Tall Tales & Legends	1985	1988
Nightmare Classics	1989	1989
The Outer Limits	1995	2000
Picture Windows	1995	1995
Dead Man's Gun	1997	1999
Masters of Horror	2005	2007
Cinema Toast	2021	2021
Super Pumped	2022	2022

=== Animation ===
Title	First broadcast	Last broadcast
Shelley Duvall's Bedtime Stories	1992	1994
Queer Duck	2002	2004
Free for All	2003	2003
Our Cartoon President	2018	2020

=== Unscripted ===
==== Docuseries ====
Title	First broadcast	Last broadcast
Family Business	2003	2006
Freshman Diaries	2003	2003
Interscope Presents: The Next Episode	2003	2003
Penn & Teller: Bullshit!	2003	2010
This American Life	2007	2009
Full Color Football: The History of the American Football League	2009	2009
Gigolos	2011	2016
All Access	2012	2023
The Untold History of the United States	2012	2013
Dark Net	2016	2017
The Circus: Inside the Greatest Political Show on Earth	2016	2023
The Putin Interviews	2017	2017
The Fourth Estate	2018	2018
Just Another Immigrant	2018	2018
The Trade	2018	2020
Murder in the Bayou	2019	2019
Shangri-La	2019	2019
Wu-Tang Clan: Of Mics and Men	2019	2019
The Comedy Store	2020	2020
Love Fraud	2020	2020
Outcry	2020	2020
Vice (Note: Originally on HBO)	2020	2023
Gossip	2021	2021
UFO	2021	2021
Everything's Gonna Be All White	2022	2022
Supreme Team	2022	2022
The Lincoln Project	2022	2022
Spector	2022	2022
Boys in Blue	2023	2023
Murder in Big Horn	2023	2023
The 12th Victim	2023	2023
Catching Lightning	2023	2023
Goliath	2023	2023
Deadlocked: How America Shaped the Supreme Court	2023	2023
The World According to Football	2023	2023

==== Reality ====
Title	First broadcast	Last broadcast
American Candidate	2004	2004
Big Brother: After Dark	2007	2012
Lock 'n Load	2009	2009
The Real L Word	2010	2012
Polyamory: Married & Dating	2012	2013
Time of Death	2013	2013
3AM	2015	2015

==== Variety ====
Title	First broadcast	Last broadcast
Motown on Showtime	1987	1989
Showtime Comedy Club Network	1987	1994
Steven Banks Home Entertainment Center	1989	1989
Jamie Foxx Presents: Laffapalooza	2003	2006
The Green Room with Paul Provenza	2010	2011
Inside Comedy	2012	2015
Desus & Mero	2019	2022
Ziwe	2021	2022
Headliners with Rachel Nichols	2023	2023

==== Sports ====
Title	First broadcast	Last broadcast
Showtime Championship Boxing	1986	2023
ShoBox: The New Generation	2001	2023
Elite Xtreme Combat	2007	2008
ShoXC	2007	2008
Inside the NFL	2008	2021
ShoMMA	2009	2012
Inside NASCAR	2010	2012
The Franchise	2011	2012
Jim Rome on Showtime	2012	2015
60 Minutes Sports	2013	2017
Bellator MMA	2021	2023

==== Stand-up comedy ====
Title	Premiere
Gary Owen: I Agree with Myself	January 16, 2015
Jay Mohr: Happy. And a Lot.	March 14, 2015
Tig Notaro: Knock Knock, It's Tig Notaro	April 17, 2015
Brad Williams: Fun Size	May 8, 2015
Jay Pharoah: Can I Be Me?	August 1, 2015
Margaret Cho: PsyCHO	September 26, 2015
Jermaine Fowler: Give'em Hell Kid	December 11, 2015
Alonzo Bodden: Historically Incorrect	February 19, 2016
Steve-O: Guilty as Charged	March 18, 2016
W. Kamau Bell: Semi-Prominent Negro	April 29, 2016
Brad Williams: Daddy Issues	May 20, 2016
Ben Gleib: Neurotic Gangster	June 3, 2016
Godfrey: Regular Black	August 12, 2016
Martin Lawrence: Doin' Time: Uncut	September 9, 2016
Sebastian Maniscalco: Why Would You Do That?	October 1, 2016
Bert Kreischer: The Machine	November 11, 2016
Tony Roberts: Motorcity Motormouth	December 2, 2016
Nick Cannon: Stand Up Don't Shoot!	February 10, 2017
Steve Byrne: Tell the Damn Joke	April 7, 2017
Al Madrigal: Shrimpin' Ain't East	May 5, 2017
Andrew Santino: Home Field Advantage	June 2, 2017
Erik Griffin: The Ugly Truth	July 7, 2017
Lavell Crawford: Home for the Holidays	November 2, 2017
Rob Gronkowski: Unsportsmanlike Comedy	January 5, 2018

=== Co-productions ===
Title	Partner/Country	First broadcast	Last broadcast
Bizarre	CTV/Canada	1980	1985
33 Brompton Place	Global/Canada	1982	1982
Super Dave	Global/Canada	1987	1994
A Bunch of Munsch	CTV/Canada	1991	1999
The Busy World of Richard Scarry	Family Channel/Canada; France 3/France	1994	1999
Chris Cross	CITV/United Kingdom	1994	1998
Total Recall 2070	OnTV/Canada	1999	1999
Odyssey 5	Space/Canada	2002	2002
Meadowlands	Channel 4/United Kingdom	2007	2007
The Tudors	BBC Two/United Kingdom; CBC/Canada; TV3/Ireland	2007	2010
Secret Diary of a Call Girl	ITV2/United Kingdom	2008	2011
La La Land	BBC Three/United Kingdom	2010	2010
The Borgias	Bravo/Canada	2011	2013
Episodes	BBC Two/United Kingdom	2011	2017
Penny Dreadful	Sky Atlantic/United Kingdom	2014	2016
Guerrilla	Sky Atlantic/United Kingdom	2017	2017
Patrick Melrose	Sky Atlantic/United Kingdom	2018	2018
Back to Life	BBC Three (season 1)/United Kingdom; BBC One (season 2)/United Kingdom	2019	2021
The Woman in the Wall	BBC One/United Kingdom	2024	2024
A Gentleman in Moscow	Paramount+/United Kingdom	2024	2024

=== Adult ===
Title	First broadcast	Last broadcast
Red Shoe Diaries	1992	1999
Love Street	1994	1996
Beverly Hills Bordello	1996	1998
Women: Stories of Passion	1996	1999
Hot Springs Hotel	1998	2000
Kama Sutra	2000	2000
Lady Chatterley's Stories	2000	2001
Sexual Healing	2006	2007
Body Language	2008	2010
Deeper Throat	2009	2009
Beach Heat: Miami	2010	2012
Dave's Old Porn	2011	2012
Submission	2016	2016

=== SkyShowtime ===
Title	Genre	First broadcast	Last broadcast	Exclusive region(s)	Language
One Way or Another (season 2)	Comedy	2023	2023	Europe	Spanish
Still Here	Comedy	2023	2023	Europe	Polish
The Winner	Comedy	2023	2023	Europe	Slovak
Codename: Annika	Crime drama	2023	2023	Europe	Finnish
Fleeting Lies	Comedy thriller	2023	2023	Europe	Spanish
Mamen Mayo	Dark comedy drama mockumentary	2024	2024	Europe	Spanish
Śleboda	Crime drama	2024	2024	Europe	Polish
All In (Note: Co-production with Play.)	Comedy drama	2026	2026	Europe	Dutch
Edyta Górniak	Music docuseries	2026	2026	Europe	Polish
The Trio	Romantic drama	2026	2026	Europe	Swedish

== Original films ==
Showtime has produced original films under two titles: "Showtime Original Pictures" and "Showtime Original Pictures for All Ages" (originally "Showtime Original Pictures for Kids"), the latter of which are made-for-cable films targeted at families:

=== 1980s ===
- Cheaters (September 27, 1980)
- A Case of Libel (1983)
- Frankenstein (June 17, 1984)
- Cat on a Hot Tin Roof (August 19, 1984)
- The Ratings Game (December 15, 1984)
- Elayne Boosler: Party of One (1985)
- Slow Burn (June 29, 1986)
- J. Edgar Hoover (January 11, 1987)
- Broadway Baby (1987)
- Gotham (August 21, 1988)
- Richard Jeni: The Boy from New York City (1989)

=== 1990–1994 ===
- Deceptions (June 10, 1990)
- Rainbow Drive (September 8, 1990)
- Psycho IV: The Beginning (November 10, 1990)
- Fourth Story (January 19, 1991)
- Flight of Black Angel (February 23, 1991)
- Paris Trout (April 20, 1991)
- Payoff (June 22, 1991)
- Deadly Surveillance (September 6, 1991)
- Intimate Stranger (November 15, 1991)
- Richard Jeni: Crazy from the Heat (1991)
- Public Enemy #2 (1991)
- Keeper of the City (January 25, 1992)
- Black Magic (March 21, 1992)
- Boris and Natasha: The Movie (April 17, 1992)
- Red Shoe Diaries (May 16, 1992)
- Sketch Artist (June 27, 1992)
- Nails (July 25, 1992)
- The Fear Inside (August 9, 1992)
- Devlin (September 12, 1992)
- Freddy Speaks (September 19, 1992)
- Mastergate (November 1, 1992)
- Double Jeopardy (November 21, 1992)
- When a Stranger Calls Back (April 4, 1993)
- Scam (May 22, 1993)
- Taking the Heat (June 6, 1993)
- Chantilly Lace (July 18, 1993)
- Body Bags (August 8, 1993)
- Praying Mantis (August 11, 1993)
- Last Light (August 22, 1993)
- The Wrong Man (September 5, 1993)
- Lush Life (October 1993)
- Children of the Mist (November 14, 1993)
- Love, Cheat and Steal (December 5, 1993)
- Heads (January 29, 1994)
- Assault at West Point: The Court-Martial of Johnson Whittaker (February 27, 1994)
- The Birds II: Land's End (March 14, 1994)
- But... Seriously (March 26, 1994)
- Royce (April 3, 1994)
- Past Tense (June 12, 1994)
- Sodbusters (July 17, 1994)
- Roadracers (July 22, 1994)
- Confessions of a Sorority Girl (July 29, 1994)
- Roswell (July 31, 1994)
- Motorcycle Gang (August 5, 1994)
- Runaway Daughters (August 12, 1994)
- Parallel Lives (August 14, 1994)
- Girls in Prison (August 19, 1994)
- Attack of the 5 Ft. 2 In. Women (August 21, 1994)
- Shake, Rattle and Rock! (August 26, 1994)
- Dragstrip Girl (September 2, 1994)
- Next Door (September 4, 1994)
- Jailbreakers (September 9, 1994)
- Cool and the Crazy (September 16, 1994)
- Reform School Girl (September 23, 1994)
- Dead Air (October 6, 1994)
- Probable Cause (November 20, 1994)

=== 1995 ===
- Sketch Artist II: Hands That See (January 28, 1995)
- Solomon & Sheba (February 26, 1995)
- Zooman (March 19, 1995)
- Sahara (April 25, 1995)
- Trade-Off (April 29, 1995)
- The Tin Soldier (May 27, 1995)
- Triplecross (May 28, 1995)
- Young Ivanhoe (July 3, 1995)
- Suspect Device (July 11, 1995)
- Convict Cowboy (July 16, 1995)
- The Alien Within (July 18, 1995)
- The Set-Up (July 23, 1995)
- Sawbones (July 25, 1995)
- Virtual Seduction (August 1, 1995)
- Hiroshima (August 6, 1995)
- Burial of the Rats (August 8, 1995)
- Harrison Bergeron (August 13, 1995)
- Not Like Us (August 15, 1995)
- Amanda and the Alien (August 20, 1995)
- Black Scorpion (August 22, 1995)
- The Wasp Woman (August 29, 1995)
- The Wharf Rat (September 3, 1995)
- Not of This Earth (September 5, 1995)
- Where Evil Lies (September 5, 1995)
- Bloodknot (September 7, 1995)
- A Bucket of Blood (September 12, 1995)
- The Courtyard (September 24, 1995)
- Max Is Missing (September 24, 1995)
- Hellfire (September 26, 1995)
- The Man in the Attic (September 27, 1995)
- Piranha (October 1, 1995)
- Terminal Virus (October 3, 1995)
- Dead Weekend (October 8, 1995)
- Down Came a Blackbird (October 22, 1995)
- Annie O (October 29, 1995)
- Full Body Massage (November 5, 1995)
- Favorite Deadly Sins (November 12, 1995)
- The Song Spinner (November 19, 1995)
- Out There (November 19, 1995)
- Silver Strand (November 26, 1995)
- Daisies in December (December 3, 1995)
- Slave of Dreams (December 10, 1995)

=== 1996 ===
- The Right to Remain Silent (January 7, 1996)
- The Halfback of Notre Dame (January 21, 1996)
- Woman Undone (February 4, 1996)
- Robin of Locksley (February 26, 1996)
- Conundrum (March 3, 1996)
- Heck's Way Home (March 8, 1996)
- Undertow (March 24, 1996)
- Mr. and Mrs. Loving (March 31, 1996)
- Sabrina the Teenage Witch (April 7, 1996)
- Homecoming (April 14, 1996)
- Yesterday's Target (April 28, 1996)
- Moonshine Highway (May 5, 1996)
- Salt Water Moose (June 2, 1996)
- Lily Dale (June 9, 1996)
- Run for the Dream: The Gail Devers Story (June 16, 1996)
- Beyond the Call (June 23, 1996)
- The Limbic Region (June 30, 1996)
- Spectre (July 13, 1996)
- Escape Clause (July 14, 1996)
- Inhumanoid (July 20, 1996)
- Miami Hustle (July 21, 1996)
- Alien Avengers (August 3, 1996)
- Shadow of a Scream (August 10, 1996)
- Subliminal Seduction (August 10, 1996)
- Ruby Jean and Joe (August 11, 1996)
- Last Exit to Earth (August 17, 1996)
- Losing Chase (August 18, 1996)
- Inside (August 25, 1996)
- The Prisoner of Zenda, Inc. (September 1, 1996)
- Gang in Blue (September 8, 1996)
- Humanoids from the Deep (September 14, 1996)
- Death Game (September 21, 1996)
- September (September 25, 1996)
- Vampirella (September 28, 1996)
- Scene of the Crime (October 5, 1996)
- When the Bullet Hits the Bone (October 12, 1996)
- Marquis de Sade (October 19, 1996)
- Shadow Zone: The Undead Express (October 27, 1996)
- Hidden in America (December 1, 1996)
- Critical Choices (December 8, 1996)
- Marshal Law (December 16, 1996)

=== 1997–1999 ===
- Whiskers (January 5, 1997)
- Mercenary (January 17, 1997)
- Mandela and de Klerk (February 16, 1997)
- Dad's Week Off (March 27, 1997)
- Ronnie & Julie (March 30, 1997)
- In the Presence of Mine Enemies (April 20, 1997)
- Riot (April 27, 1997)
- When Time Expires (May 10, 1997)
- Black Scorpion II (May 13, 1997)
- Legend of the Lost Tomb (May 18, 1997)
- The Garden of Redemption (May 25, 1997)
- In His Father's Shoes (June 15, 1997)
- Desert's Edge (June 25, 1997)
- North Shore Fish (June 29, 1997)
- Business for Pleasure (July 2, 1997)
- The Unspeakable (1997)
- Elvis Meets Nixon (August 10, 1997)
- 12 Angry Men (August 17, 1997)
- The Don's Analyst (September 6, 1997)
- Color of Justice (September 7, 1997)
- Get a Clue (September 14, 1997)
- Lolita (September 25, 1997)
- Gold Coast (September 28, 1997)
- Rescuers: Stories of Courage: Two Women (October 5, 1997)
- Shadow Zone: My Teacher Ate My Homework (October 8, 1997)
- Joe Torre: Curveballs Along the Way (October 17, 1997)
- Alien Avengers II (October 25, 1997)
- Spacejacked (November 8, 1997)
- The Haunted Sea (November 17, 1997)
- Alone (December 21, 1997)
- Woman Undone (December 22, 1997)
- Tricks (December 22, 1997)
- The Tiger Woods Story (April 12, 1998)
- The Tale of Sweeney Todd (April 19, 1998)
- Rescuers: Stories of Courage: Two Couples (May 10, 1998)
- Running Wild (July 26, 1998)
- The Baby Dance (August 23, 1998)
- Rescuers: Stories of Courage: Two Families (September 21, 1998)
- Twists of Terror (October 17, 1998)
- The Devil's Arithmetic (March 28, 1999)
- Freak City (April 1999)
- Inherit the Wind (May 29, 1999)
- The Passion of Ayn Rand (May 30, 1999)
- A Cooler Climate (August 22, 1999)
- Strange Justice (August 29, 1999)
- The Apartment Complex (October 31, 1999)
- Brotherhood of Murder (December 12, 1999)

=== 2000s ===
- Death of a Salesman (January 9, 2000)
- Enslavement: The True Story of Fanny Kemble (April 2000)
- Rated X (May 13, 2000)
- Dirty Pictures (May 20, 2000)
- Ratz (July 9, 2000)
- Bash: Latter-Day Plays (August 28, 2000)
- Possessed (October 22, 2000)
- Seventeen Again (November 12, 2000)
- A Girl Thing (January 20, 2001)
- Things Behind the Sun (January 24, 2001)
- Bojangles (February 2, 2001)
- Things You Can Tell Just by Looking at Her (March 11, 2001)
- My Horrible Year! (July 4, 2001)
- Keep the Faith, Baby (February 2002)
- 10,000 Black Men Named George (February 2002)
- Last Call (May 25, 2002)
- Women vs. Men (August 4, 2002)
- Bang Bang You're Dead (October 13, 2002)
- Sightings: Heartland Ghost (October 27, 2002)
- Soldier's Girl (January 20, 2003)
- Carry Me Home (February 3, 2003)
- The Roman Spring of Mrs. Stone (May 4, 2003)
- Jasper, Texas (June 8, 2003)
- The Maldonado Miracle (October 12, 2003)
- The Reagans (November 30, 2003)
- The Lion in Winter (December 12, 2003)
- Parasite (2004)
- Sucker Free City (September 16, 2004)
- Reversal of Fortune (2005)
- Reefer Madness: The Movie Musical (April 16, 2005)
- An American Crime (May 5, 2008)
- Our Fathers (May 21, 2005)

=== 2020s ===
- Ray Donovan: The Movie (January 14, 2022)
- Meet Me in the Bathroom (November 25, 2022)
- Heist 88 (September 29, 2023)
- The Caine Mutiny Court-Martial (October 6, 2023)
