= Daniel Sousa =

Daniel Sousa may refer to:

- Daniel Sousa (director) (born 1974), Portuguese short film director
- Daniel Sousa (football manager) (born 1984), Portuguese football manager
- Daniel Sousa (Marvel Cinematic Universe), fictional character from the Marvel Television series Agent Carter and Agents of S.H.I.E.L.D.
