= Dan Golden =

Dan Golden may refer to:

- Daniel Golden, American journalist
- Dan Golden (filmmaker), American composer and film maker
