= Gabriella Hall =

American actress (born 1966)

- Born: Laura Rosa Saldivar; November 11, 1966 (age 59); Los Angeles, California U.S.
- Other names: Laura Saldivar, Gabriella Skye
- Modeling information
- Height: 5 ft 8.5 in (1.74 m)
- Hair color: brown
- Eye color: brown

Gabriella Hall (born Laura Rosa Saldivar November 11, 1966) is a model and former softcore pornography actress from Los Angeles best known for her appearances in Cinemax TV shows and movies such as Erotic Confessions and Beverly Hills Bordello. She appeared in 62 TV shows, movies and direct-to-video productions. She has posed for Playboy magazine and appeared in one of their videos, Playboy: Girls of the Internet (as Gabriella Skye).

== Biography ==
Hall was born in Los Angeles but grew up in Northern California. She auditioned for fashion print work as a way to pay for veterinarian school. Her fashion print work led to runway modeling in Europe before she returned to California.

Her first major acting role was in a movie called Centerfold (later renamed Naked Ambition). After that, she would go on to appear in 18 features over the next two years. She gained recognition in the Nicolas Roeg drama, Full Body Massage, as the younger flashback of Mimi Rogers' character, Nina.

Her final appearance, in the 2005 direct-to-video release Jacqueline Hyde, also marked her second (of two) credit as producer.

== Selected filmography ==
- Jacqueline Hyde (2005), as Jackie Hyde
- Deviant Obsession (2002), as Evelyn Hathaway
- Sex Files: Alien Erotica II (2000), as Nurse Swanson
- Virgins of Sherwood Forest (2000), as Roberta O'Sullivan
- Sex Files: Alien Erotica (1999), as Anne Gallo
- The Exotic Time Machine (1998), as Daria
- The Erotic Misadventures of the Invisible Man (1998) as Kelly Parkinson
- Centerfold (1996), as Gail
- Love Me Twice (1996), as Andrea
- Full Body Massage (1995) (credited as Laura Saldivar), as Young Nina

== Selected TV appearances ==
- Lady Chatterly's Stories playing "Joy" in episode: "Fantasy" 2001
- Kama Sutra playing "Paula" in episode: "Love Quarrels"
- Kama Sutra playing "Shannon" in episode: "Women of the Royal Harem"
- Beverly Hills Bordello (9 episodes)
- Women: Stories of Passion playing "Young Eileen" in episode: "Motel Magic" (episode # 31) 1997
- Erotic Confessions playing "Laura" in episode: "Boss's Orders" (episode # 9) 1995
- Erotic Confessions playing "Angela" in episode: "The Bad Boy" (episode # 2) 1996
- Erotic Confessions playing "Madelyn Reed" in episode: "Madelyn's Laundry" (episode #4) 1996 (3 episodes)
