= Feral (2012 film) =

- Film poster
- Directed by: Daniel Sousa
- Written by: Daniel Sousa
- Produced by: Daniel Sousa
- Music by: Dan Golden
- Distributed by: Creative Capital
- Release date: August 2012 (Russia)
- Running time: 13 minutes
- Country: United States
- Language: English

Feral is a 2012 American animated short film by Daniel Sousa.

== Plot ==
A feral boy is found in the woods and brought back to live in society. Uncomfortable in this new environment, the boy tries to adapt by using the same strategies and tactics that kept him safe in the wild.

== Release ==
Feral premiered January 19, 2013 at the Sundance Film Festival in Park City, Utah.

== Accolades ==
Awards
Award	Date of ceremony	Category	Recipients and nominees	Result
Academy Awards	March 2, 2014	Best Animated Short Film	Daniel Sousa and Dan Golden	Nominated
