= Roger Corman =

American film director and producer (1926–2024)

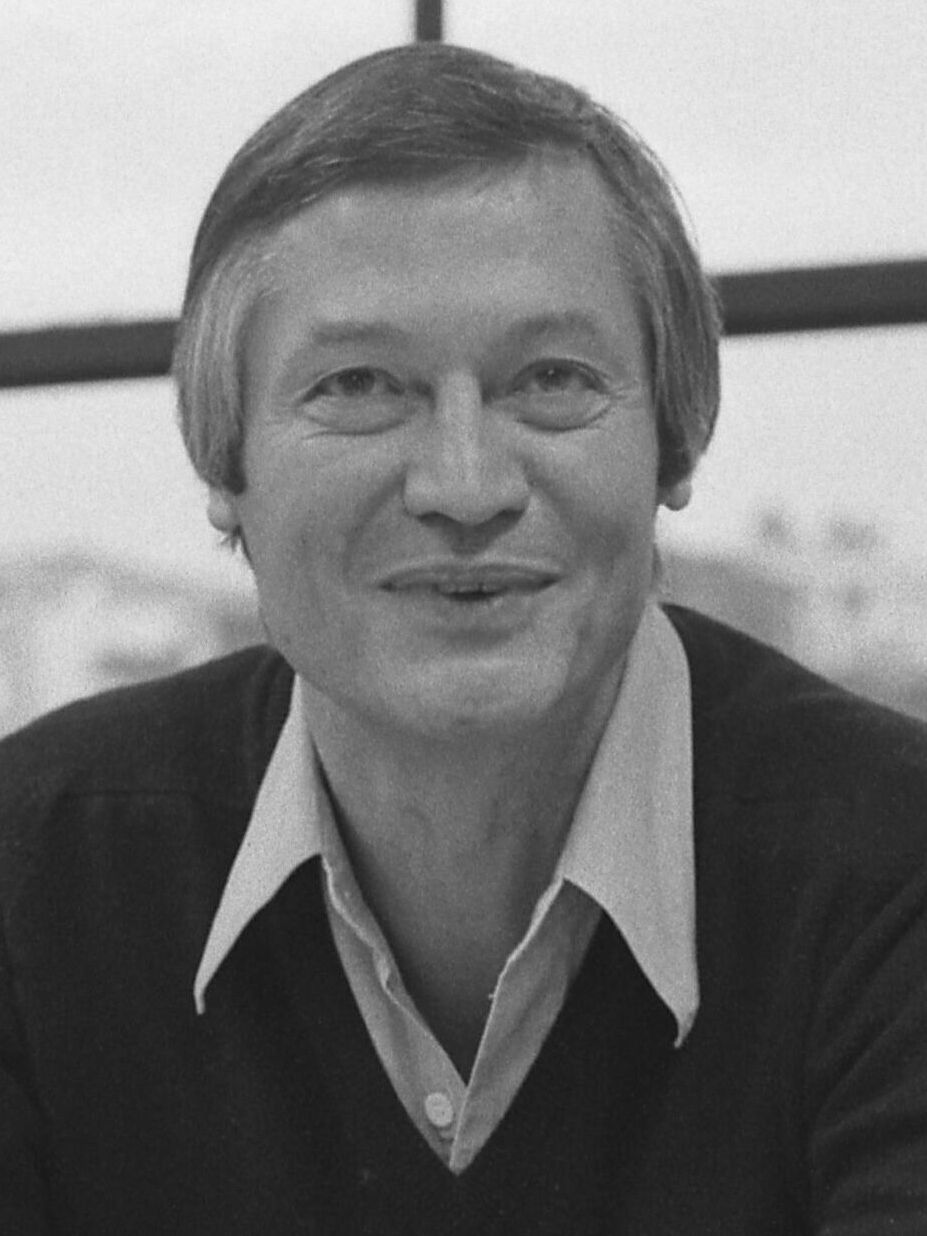
- Corman in 1978
- Born: Roger William Corman; April 5, 1926; Detroit, Michigan, U.S.
- Died: May 9, 2024 (aged 98); Santa Monica, California, U.S.
- Education: Stanford University (BS)
- Occupations: Film director; producer
- Years active: 1954–2024
- Spouse: Julie Halloran (m. 1970)
- Children: 4
- Relatives: Gene Corman (brother)
- Military career
- Allegiance: United States
- Branch: United States Navy
- Service years: 1944–1946
- Conflicts: World War II

Roger William Corman (April 5, 1926 – May 9, 2024) was an American film director and producer. Known under various monikers such as "The Pope of Pop Cinema", “King of the Beatnik Movies”, "The Spiritual Godfather of the New Hollywood", and "The King of Cult", he was known as a trailblazer in the world of independent film.

Many of the more than 500 features directed or produced by Corman were low-budget films that later attracted a cult following, such as A Bucket of Blood (1959), The Little Shop of Horrors (1960), The Intruder (1962), X: The Man with the X-ray Eyes (1963), and the counterculture films The Wild Angels (1966) and The Trip (1967). House of Usher (1960) became the first of eight films directed by Corman that were adapted from the tales of Edgar Allan Poe, and which collectively came to be known as the "Poe Cycle".

In 1964, Corman became the youngest filmmaker to have a retrospective at the Cinémathèque française, as well as in the British Film Institute and the Museum of Modern Art. He was the co-founder of New World Pictures, the founder of New Concorde and was a longtime member of the Academy of Motion Picture Arts and Sciences. In 2009, he was awarded an Academy Honorary Award "for his rich engendering of films and filmmakers".

Corman was also famous for handling the American distribution of many films by noted foreign directors, including Federico Fellini (Italy), Ingmar Bergman (Sweden), François Truffaut (France) and Akira Kurosawa (Japan). He mentored and gave a start to many young film directors such as Francis Ford Coppola, Ron Howard, Martin Scorsese, Jonathan Demme, Peter Bogdanovich, Joe Dante, John Sayles, and James Cameron, and was highly influential in the New Hollywood filmmaking movement of the 1960s and 1970s. He also helped to launch the careers of actors including Peter Fonda, Jack Nicholson, Dennis Hopper, Bruce Dern, Diane Ladd, and William Shatner.

Corman occasionally acted in films by directors who started with him, including The Godfather Part II (1974), The Silence of the Lambs (1991), Philadelphia (1993), Apollo 13 (1995), and The Manchurian Candidate (2004). A documentary about Corman's life and career titled Corman's World: Exploits of a Hollywood Rebel, directed by Alex Stapleton, premiered at Sundance and also screened at Cannes in 2011; the film's TV rights were picked up by A&E IndieFilms.

== Early life and education ==
Corman was born in Detroit, Michigan, to Anne (née High) and William Corman, a civil engineer of Russian Jewish descent. His younger brother, Gene, produced numerous films, sometimes in collaboration with Roger. Corman was raised in his mother's Catholic faith.

Corman went to Beverly Hills High School and then to Stanford University to study industrial engineering. While at Stanford, Corman realized he did not want to be an engineer. He enlisted in the V-12 Navy College Training Program when he still had six months of study to complete. After serving in the United States Navy from 1944 to 1946, he returned to Stanford to finish his degree, receiving a Bachelor of Science degree in industrial engineering in 1947. While at Stanford University, Corman was initiated in the fraternity Sigma Alpha Epsilon.

In 1948, he worked briefly at U.S. Electrical Motors on Slauson Avenue in Los Angeles, but his career in engineering lasted only four days; he began work on Monday and quit on Thursday, telling his boss "I've made a terrible mistake." Soon after that he found work at 20th Century Fox as a messenger in the mailroom, earning $32.50 per week, following his brother, who worked in the mailroom, at MCA Inc.

== Career ==
=== 1950–1959: Early film career ===
Corman worked his way up to a story reader. The one property that he liked the most and provided ideas for was filmed as The Gunfighter with Gregory Peck. When Corman received no credit at all, he left Fox and decided he would work in film by himself. Under the G.I. Bill, Corman studied English literature at the University of Oxford and lived in Paris for a time.

Corman then returned to Los Angeles and tried to re-establish himself in the film industry. He took various jobs, including television stagehand at KLAC-TV and a messenger at Fox. He worked as an assistant to literary agent Dick Hyland.

Corman wrote a script in his spare time and sold it to William F. Broidy at Allied Artists for US$2,000 (equivalent to $23,978 in 2025). "Dick thought it was funny and let me pay myself a commission," said Corman. Originally called House in the Sea, it was retitled Highway Dragnet (1954) and starred Richard Conte and Joan Bennett. Corman also worked without pay as associate producer on the film, to gain experience.

Corman used his script fee and personal contacts to raise US$12,000 (equivalent to $143,866 in 2025) to produce his first feature, a science-fiction film, Monster from the Ocean Floor (1954). It was produced by Corman's own company, Palo Alto, and released by Robert L. Lippert.

The film did well enough to encourage Corman to produce another film, the racing-car thriller The Fast and the Furious (1954), directed by its star, John Ireland, and co-starring Dorothy Malone. (Decades later, the title would be licensed from Corman for a blockbuster film of the same name.) Corman sold the movie to a new independent company, the American Releasing Company (ARC), run by James H. Nicholson and Samuel Z. Arkoff. Although Corman had a number of offers for the film from Republic and Columbia, he elected to go with ARC because they offered him a monetary advance which would enable him to produce two more movies.

Corman's second film for ARC was one he decided to direct, Five Guns West (1955), a Western, made in color for around $60,000, with Malone and John Lund. The script was written by Robert Wright Campbell, who worked with Corman on several more occasions. Corman announced he would make four more projects for ARC: High Steel, Cobra, Fortress Beneath the Sea, and an untitled film from Campbell. Instead, Corman did some uncredited directing on The Beast with a Million Eyes (1955), then made another Western, Apache Woman (1955), starring Lloyd Bridges, written by Lou Rusoff. Rusoff and Corman reunited on Day the World Ended (1955), a postapocalyptic science-fiction film, which was popular.

Corman was to make The Devil on Horseback by Charles B. Griffith about the Brownsville Raid, but it was too expensive. The Woolner Brothers, Louisiana drive-in owners, financed Corman's Swamp Women (1956), a girls-on-the-lam saga. He returned to ARC for two Westerns, The Oklahoma Woman (1956) and Gunslinger (1956) (with Ireland); Gunslinger was co-written by Griffith, who became a crucial collaborator with Corman over the next five years. He bought a script from Curtis Harrington, The Girl from Beneath the Sea, which Harrington made for Corman years later, as Night Tide (1961).

Beverly Garland, one of Corman's early regular stock players, recalled working with him:

Roger made us work hard and long, I remember that! He was always fascinating to me, a fascinating man – and a good businessman! He had such incredible energy, it was tremendous – he was a dynamo to be around. I always knew he was going to be a huge success because there was no stopping him. He just made up his mind that he was going to be a success and that was it.

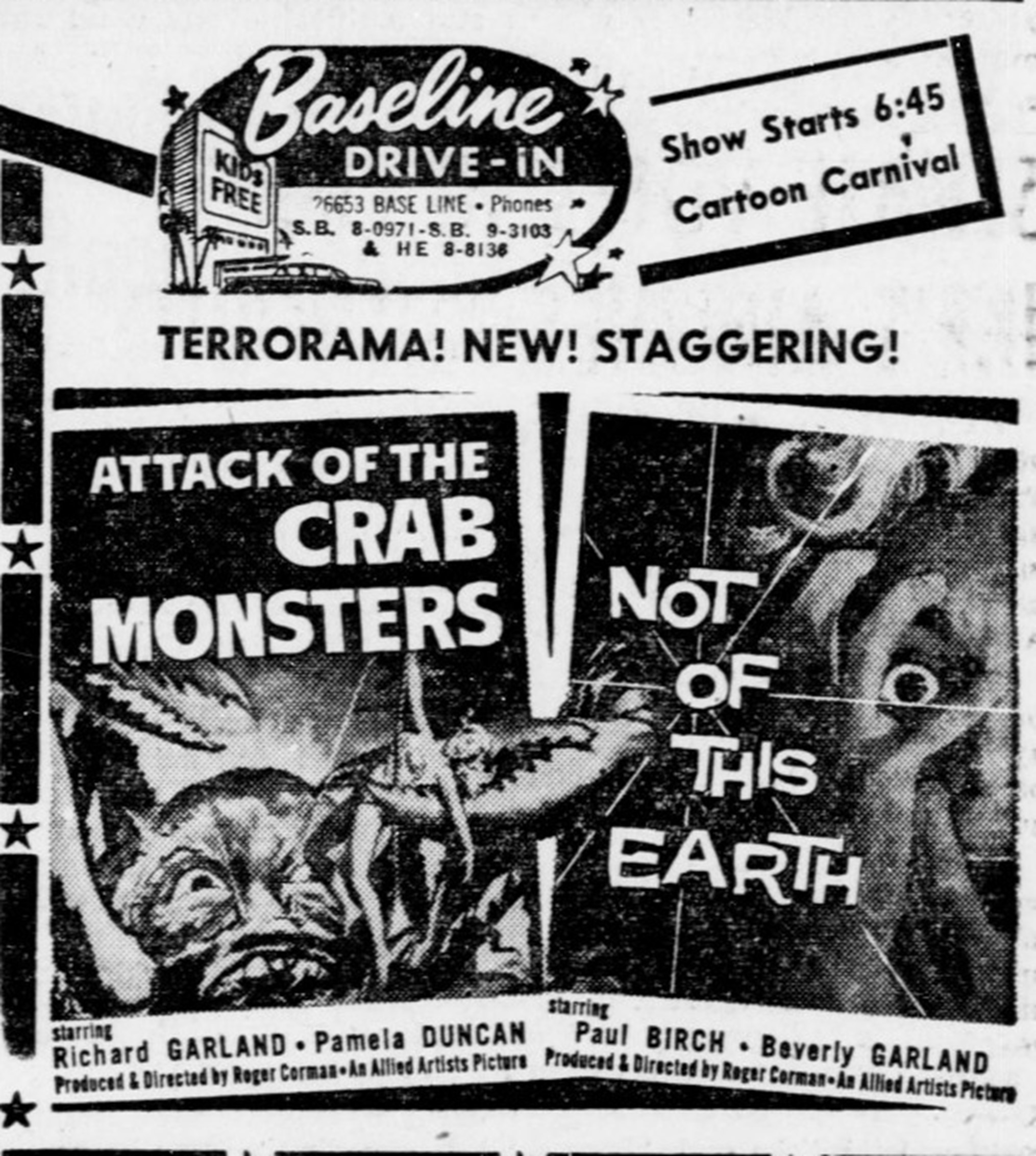
Drive-in advertisement from 1957 for the double feature, Attack of the Crab Monsters and Not of This Earth. Corman films were popular on the drive-in circuit, and generally marketed towards a teenage audience.

ARC changed its name to American International Pictures. Corman was established as their leading filmmaker. They financed Corman's next film as director, the science-fiction story It Conquered the World (1956). Co-written by Griffith, it was a follow-up to The Day the World Ended and became a big hit.

He optioned a TV play, The Stake, and hoped to get Dana Andrews to star. It was never made. Instead, Walter Mirisch of Allied Artists hired Corman to make The Undead (1957), inspired by The Search for Bridey Murphy. Griffith wrote the script. In June, Corman made a science-fiction film for Allied Artists, Not of this Earth (1957), also written by Griffith. In August 1956, AIP (American International Pictures) financed a Corman heist movie shot in Hawaii, Naked Paradise (1957), co-written by Griffith. Corman shot it back-to-back with a movie made using his own money, She Gods of Shark Reef (1958). Corman wound up selling the movie to AIP. Corman and Griffith reunited in Attack of the Crab Monsters (1957) for Allied, which became one of his most successful early films.

For his own production company, Corman made a rock-and-roll "quickle", Carnival Rock (1957), released by Howco. Rock All Night (1957) was a heist film written by Griffith expanded from a TV play, "The Little Guy", with musical acts inserted. It was planned for him to make Rock'n'Roll Girl for AIP in December 1957. In April 1957, Corman announced he would try to make two films back-to-back from then on to save costs.

Corman made two "teen girl noirs", Teenage Doll (1957) for the Woolner Brothers and Sorority Girl (1957), starring Susan Cabot for AIP. For AIP, he made The Saga of the Viking Women and Their Voyage to the Waters of the Great Sea Serpent (1957), shot in August 1957. He was set to follow this with Teenage Jungle by Tony Miller. The success of Not of this Earth and Crab Monsters led to Allied offering Corman a four-picture deal for 1958.

Corman received his first serious critical praise for Machine-Gun Kelly (1958), an AIP biopic of the famous gangster, which gave Charles Bronson his first leading role and co-starred Cabot. Campbell wrote the script. Also for AIP, he did Teenage Caveman (1958), with Robert Vaughn, originally titled Prehistoric World. He helped produce two films for Allied Artists, both from scripts by Leo Gordon: Hot Car Girl (1958), directed by Bernard Kowalski and produced by his brother Gene (the first film they made together) from a script by Gordon; and The Cry Baby Killer (1958), which gave Jack Nicholson his first starring role.

He was given his biggest budget yet in 1958 for I Mobster, a gangster story, co-produced by Edward L. Alperson and Corman's brother Gene for 20th Century Fox. In September 1958, he was reported scouting locations in Australia to do a remake of H. Rider Haggard's She. War of the Satellites (1958) was conceived and shot in record time to take advantage of the Sputnik launch; it was his first collaboration with art director Daniel Haller. Corman also produced, but did not direct, Stakeout on Dope Street (1958), directed by Irvin Kershner, Night of the Blood Beast (1958), directed by Kowalski for AIP, using leftover costumes from Teenage Caveman, and Crime and Punishment U.S.A. (1959), directed by Dennis Sanders with George Hamilton in his first lead role.

=== The Filmgroup ===
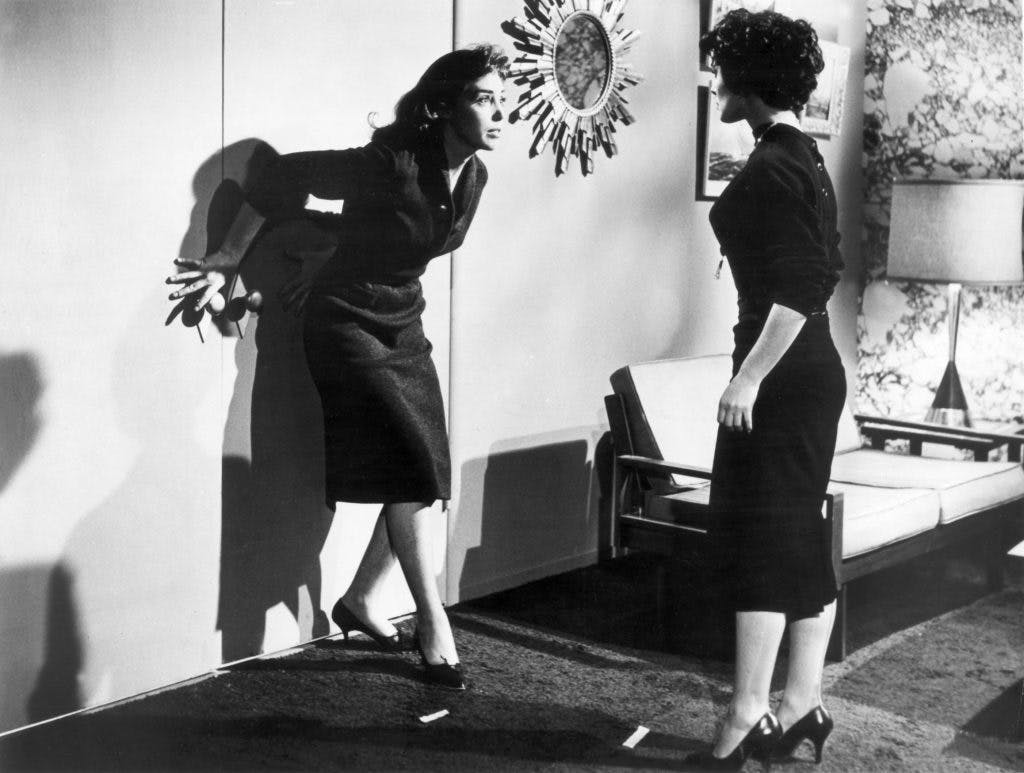
Barboura Morris and Susan Cabot in a scene from The Wasp Woman (1959)

In January 1959, Corman announced he would be moving into distribution.

In 1959, Corman founded The Filmgroup with his brother Gene, a company producing or releasing low-budget black-and-white films as double features for drive-ins and action houses. In February 1959, Filmgroup announced they would release 10 films. Their first movies were High School Big Shot (1959) and T-Bird Gang (1959), produced by Stanley Bickman.

Roger seemed a driven man. Roger wanted to accomplish a lot, he had to have a lot of drive to do it, and he pushed through. He not only pushed through, he punched through! With a lot of energy, and a lot of disregard at times... What we did for Roger Corman – I mean, things that you could never do in a real studio, but you did for this guy! Everything seemed unreal with him.
– Susan Cabot

For AIP, Corman and Griffith made a black comedy, A Bucket of Blood (1959). Corman announced he would follow it with a similar comedy, The Bloodshot Private Eye. Apparently, it was never made. Instead, Griffith reused the same script structure and Corman employed many of the same cast in The Little Shop of Horrors (1960). This film was reputedly shot in two days and one night.

For Filmgroup, Corman directed The Wasp Woman (1959), starring Cabot from a script by Gordon. With his brother, he made two films back-to-back in South Dakota: Ski Troop Attack (1960), a war movie written by Griffith and directed by Corman, and Beast from Haunted Cave (1959), the first film directed by Monte Hellman.

Corman went to Puerto Rico and produced another two films back-to-back: Battle of Blood Island (1960), directed by Joel Rapp, and Last Woman on Earth (1960), directed by Corman from a script by Robert Towne. These two films were made very quickly and, incentivized by the tax breaks available for filming in Puerto Rico, Corman commissioned Griffith to write a third, which he shot at the same time: Creature from the Haunted Sea (1961).

Corman was going to make Part Time Mother from a script by Griffith but it appears to have never been made.

=== 1960–1969: Adaptations and studio work ===
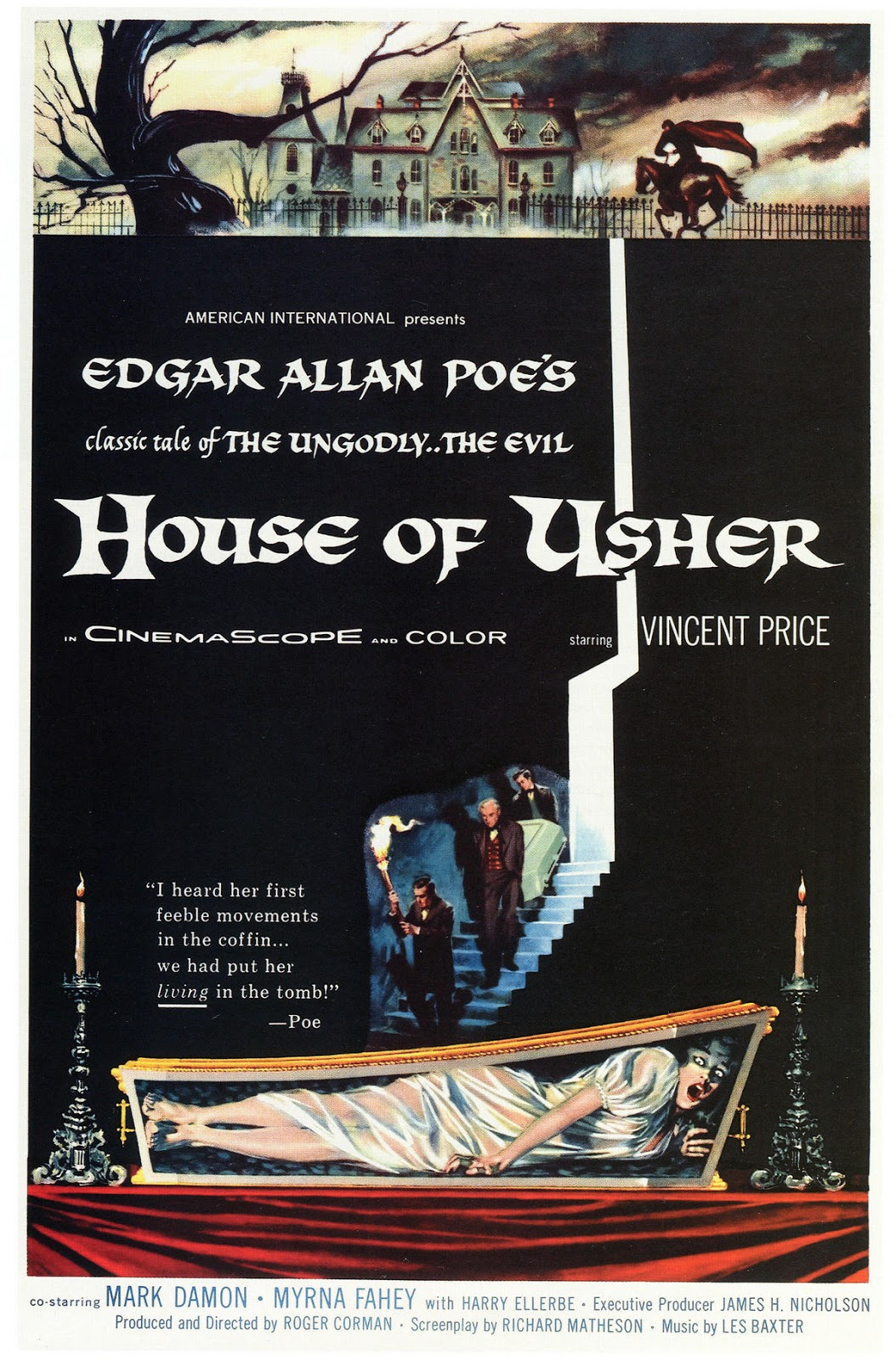
House of Usher (1960), Corman's first Edgar Allan Poe adaptation

AIP wanted Corman to make two horror films for them, in black and white, at under $100,000 each on a 10-day shooting schedule. Corman, however, was tired of making films on this sort of budget and was worried the market for them was in decline. He proposed making a film in color for $200,000, shot over 15 days. Corman proposed an adaptation of "The Fall of the House of Usher" by Edgar Allan Poe and AIP agreed. The film was announced in May 1959.

Richard Matheson was hired to do the adaptation and Vincent Price was brought in to star; Haller did the art direction. The resulting film, House of Usher (1960), shot in early 1960, was a critical and commercial hit.

Following this, Corman bought two scripts, Sob Sisters Don't Cry and Cop Killer. In March 1960, Corman announced that Filmgroup would be part of an international production group, Compass Productions. He directed a peplum in Greece, Atlas, (1961) in August.

He was going to direct a thriller from a script by Robert Towne, I Flew a Spy Plane Over Russia. It was not made; neither were two comedies he was to make with Dick Miller and Jon Haze, Murder at the Convention and Pan and the Satyrs.

House of Usher had been so successful that AIP wanted a follow-up, and Corman, Haller, Matheson and Price reunited on The Pit and the Pendulum (1961). It was another sizable hit, and the "Poe cycle" of films was underway.

Corman hired Charles Beaumont to write Masque of the Red Death and announced two films, Captain Nemo and the Floating City and House of Secrets.

=== The Intruder ===
Following The Pit and the Pendulum, Corman directed one of William Shatner's earliest appearances in a lead role with The Intruder (a.k.a. The Stranger, 1962). Based on a novel by Charles Beaumont, the film was co-produced by Gene Corman and was shot in July and August 1961. It took a while for the film to be released and it lost money.

Corman was unhappy with his profit participation on the first two Poe films, so he made a third adaptation for different producers, The Premature Burial (1962), written by Charles Beaumont and starring Ray Milland. The film was co-financed by Pathe labs; AIP put pressure on Pathe by threatening to withdraw lab work from them and ended up buying out their interest.

For producer Edward Small, Corman made a historical horror piece about Richard III, Tower of London (1962), starring Vincent Price. It was meant to be the first in a three-picture deal with Small, but Corman did not enjoy working with the producer.

For Filmgroup, he also bought the rights to a Soviet science-fiction film, Nebo Zovyot (1959) and had some additional footage shot for it by his then-assistant, Francis Ford Coppola; the result was Battle Beyond the Sun (1962). He also released The Magic Voyage of Sinbad (1962), dubbed from a Soviet film.

The fourth Poe was an anthology, Tales of Terror (1962), shot in late 1961. One of the installments, "The Black Cat", was a comedy, inspiring Corman to do a whole Poe story comedically next: The Raven (1963). Later, Corman used the sets for that film for The Terror (1963), made for Filmgroup but released by AIP, and starring Boris Karloff (whose scenes were all shot in two days) and Jack Nicholson. Corman did not direct all of this film; additional scenes were shot by Monte Hellman, Coppola, and Jack Hill, among others.

The Young Racers (1963) was produced and directed by Corman in Europe for AIP, starring and written by Campbell. Working on the film was Francis Ford Coppola, whom Corman financed to make his directorial debut, Dementia 13 (1963).

Back in the U.S., Corman made X: The Man with the X-ray Eyes (1963), a contemporary science-fiction film for AIP starring Ray Milland. He followed it with The Haunted Palace (1963), ostensibly part of the Poe cycle—it featured Price and was made for AIP, written by Beaumont—but was actually based on a story by H. P. Lovecraft.

Corman directed a war film in Yugoslavia with his brother, The Secret Invasion (1964), with Stewart Granger and Mickey Rooney, from a script by Campbell. Following this, he announced he would make The Life of Robert E. Lee as part of a four-picture deal with Filmgroup worth $3.75 million. Other movies were Fun and Profit by Joel Rapp, The Wild Surfers by John Lamb, and Planet of Storms by Jack Hill. None of these films were made; neither was The Gold Bug, a Poe adaptation written by Griffith.

=== End of the Poe cycle and filming in Europe ===
Corman made two Poes in England starring Price, the much-delayed The Masque of the Red Death (1964), with Campbell rewriting Beaumont's scripts, and The Tomb of Ligeia (1965), from a script by Robert Towne. Corman made no further Poes; AIP started up a fresh Poe cycle in the late 1960s, but Corman was not part of it.

Corman got Towne to write a script called The Red Baron. He bought the rights to another Soviet science-fiction film, Planeta Bur (1962), and had some additional footage added to it by Curtis Harrington. The result was Voyage to the Prehistoric Planet (1965). Harrington used footage from Planeta Bur in another film financed by Corman, Queen of Blood (1966).

He also bought the rights to a Yugoslavian film, Operation Titan (1963), and financed additional shooting by Jack Hill and Stephanie Rothman. The result was Blood Bath (1966). He also had an investment in the beach party films Beach Ball (1965) and It's a Bikini World (1967).

=== Working for major studios ===
Corman said, "For ten years as an independent I could get financing for $100–$200–$300,000 pictures. Everything had been interesting, artistically satisfying, economically satisfying. But I decided I was going nowhere and wanted to move directly into the business. So I accepted a contract with Columbia."

In August 1965, Corman announced he had signed a contract with United Artists to make two films over three years. He also signed with Columbia to make a Western, The Long Ride Home, based on a script by Robert Towne.

He was announced for a number of other projects at Columbia: the biopic of Robert E. Lee, an adaptation of Portrait of the Artist as a Young Man, an adaptation of Kafka's The Penal Colony, and a script by novelist Richard Yates about the Battle of Iwo Jima. He intended to make The Deserters for UA, from a script by Wright, but that was not made either.

He later reflected, "Every idea I submitted was considered too strange, too weird; every idea they had seemed too ordinary to me. Ordinary pictures don't make money."

=== The Wild Angels ===
After a year of not directing, Corman took a leave of absence under his contract with Columbia to make a film for AIP, the first biker movie, The Wild Angels. It starred Peter Fonda and Nancy Sinatra, from a script by Griffith; Peter Bogdanovich worked as Corman's assistant. The film opened the 1966 Venice Film Festival and was hugely successful at the box office, making over $6 million on a $350,000 budget and kicking off the "biker movie" cycle.

He wanted to make a film about the Red Baron, but Columbia turned it down because of The Blue Max (1966). He proposed a movie about the St Valentine's Day Massacre and also an adaptation of the novel Only Lovers Left Alive. Nick Ray was meant to be making Only Lovers in Britain.

Corman did begin directing Long Ride Home with Glenn Ford at Columbia. However, Corman left production a few weeks into the shoot in June 1966 and was replaced by Phil Karlson. The film was retitled A Time for Killing (1967).

Corman received an offer to direct a studio film, The St. Valentine's Day Massacre (1967), for 20th Century Fox, starring Jason Robards and George Segal. He did not enjoy the restrictions of working for a major studio. He was given a $2.5 million budget and made it for $400,000 less. Corman, an independent director, was most comfortable in his own style: shoestring budgets and shooting schedules measured in days, rather than weeks. Nonetheless, it is generally considered one of his best films as a director.

Corman was meant to follow this with Robert E. Lee for United Artists at a budget of $4.5 million. It was not made. Neither was a story Corman optioned, The Spy in the Vatican.

=== 1965–1971: Return to independent films ===
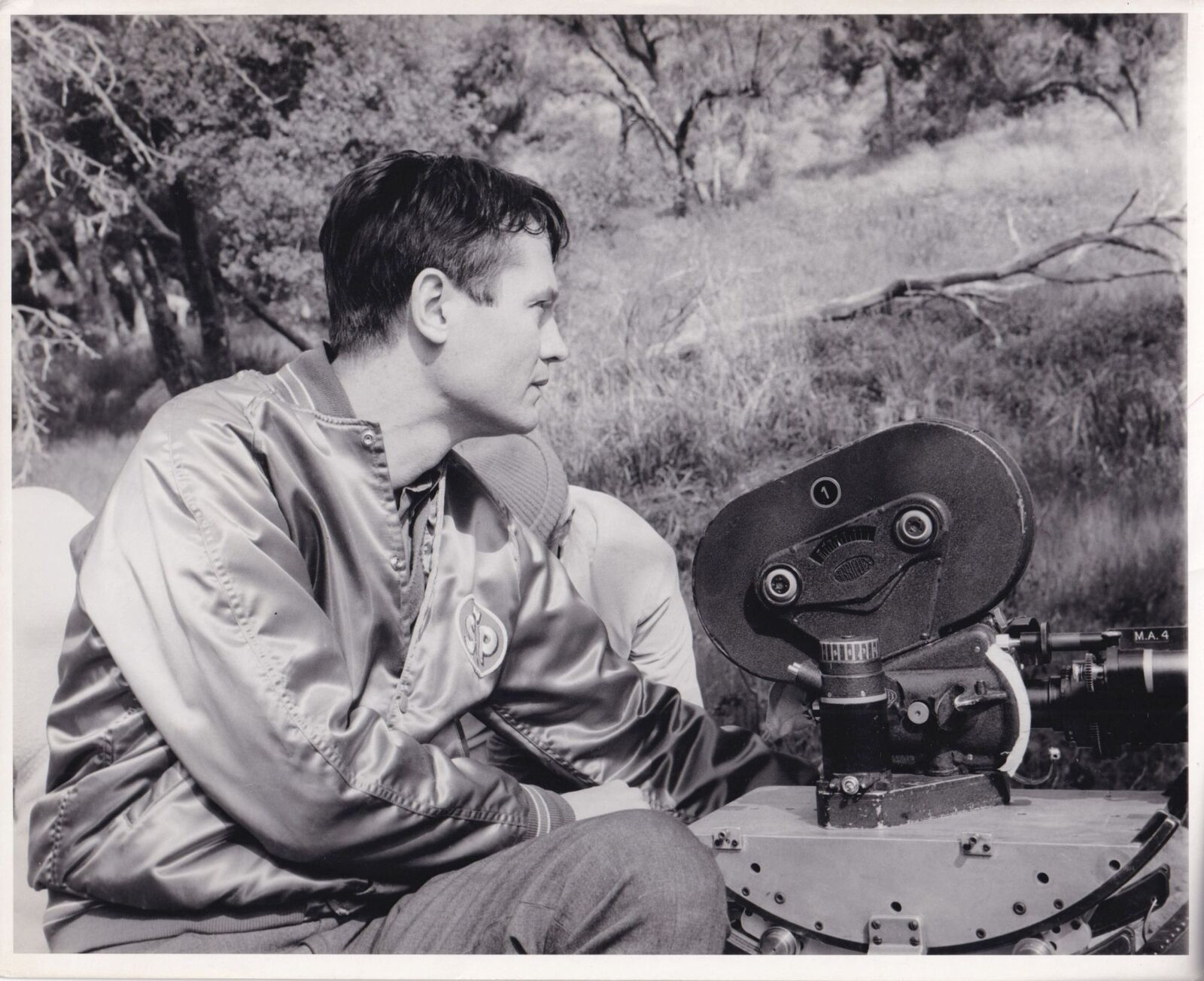
Corman on the set of The Trip (1967)

Corman continued to finance films for Filmgroup: Voyage to the Prehistoric Planet (1965), dubbing a Soviet movie Planeta Bur into English with some additional footage shot by Curtis Harrington, Queen of Blood (1966), using some Soviet footage but a mostly new film, directed by Harrington, Blood Bath (1966), an adapted Yugoslavian film with additional footage shot by Stephanie Rothman and Jack Hill, and Voyage to the Planet of Prehistoric Women (1967), yet another dubbed version of Planeta Bur with some additional footage shot by Corman's then-assistant Peter Bogdanovich.

He financed two Westerns shot back to back in Utah, directed by Monte Hellman and written and co-produced by Jack Nicholson, The Shooting (1966) and Ride in the Whirlwind (1966), which were never released theatrically in the US but became cult successes several years later. Corman had money in Navy vs. the Night Monsters (1967). He also financed two films directed by Dan Haller, Devil's Angels (1967), a follow-up to Wild Angels written by Griffith, and a car racing film shot in Europe, The Wild Racers (1968). He announced a comedy about the population explosion, There Just Isn't Any Room, but it appears to have never been made.

== End of tenure with AIP ==
Corman directed The Trip for AIP, written by Jack Nicholson and starring Peter Fonda, Dennis Hopper, and Bruce Dern. This began the psychedelic film craze of the late 1960s and was the American entry at Cannes that year. Corman took LSD and used the experience to shape the film. AIP made some changes to the film in post-production, which made Corman unhappy.

Corman made a film for American TV, Target: Harry (1968), shot in Europe with his brother producing. He did some uncredited directing on AIP's De Sade (1969) when director Cy Endfield fell ill. He financed Bogdanovich's first feature, Targets (1968), which incorporated footage from The Terror. He also produced The Dunwich Horror (1970) for AIP, directed by Haller and co-written by Curtis Hanson, and financed Haller's Paddy.

For AIP, Corman returned to the director's chair for a gangster film, Bloody Mama (1970), based on the true-crime exploits of Ma Barker and starring Shelley Winters and a young Robert de Niro. It was a big hit at the box office.

After directing 33 pictures for American International, Corman left the company when his latest features had all been re-edited without his knowledge. The most extreme case was the black comedy Gas-s-s-s (1970), written by George Armitage. Corman reflected, "I was going against Establishment taste and sensibility in my films of the late 1960s. AIP was losing its nerve, maybe shaken by the controversy around the biker and acid movies. But Jim Nicholson, AIP's president, had grown conservative and it was his objections to my work that led to the cuts. Jim had done this on four films in a row."

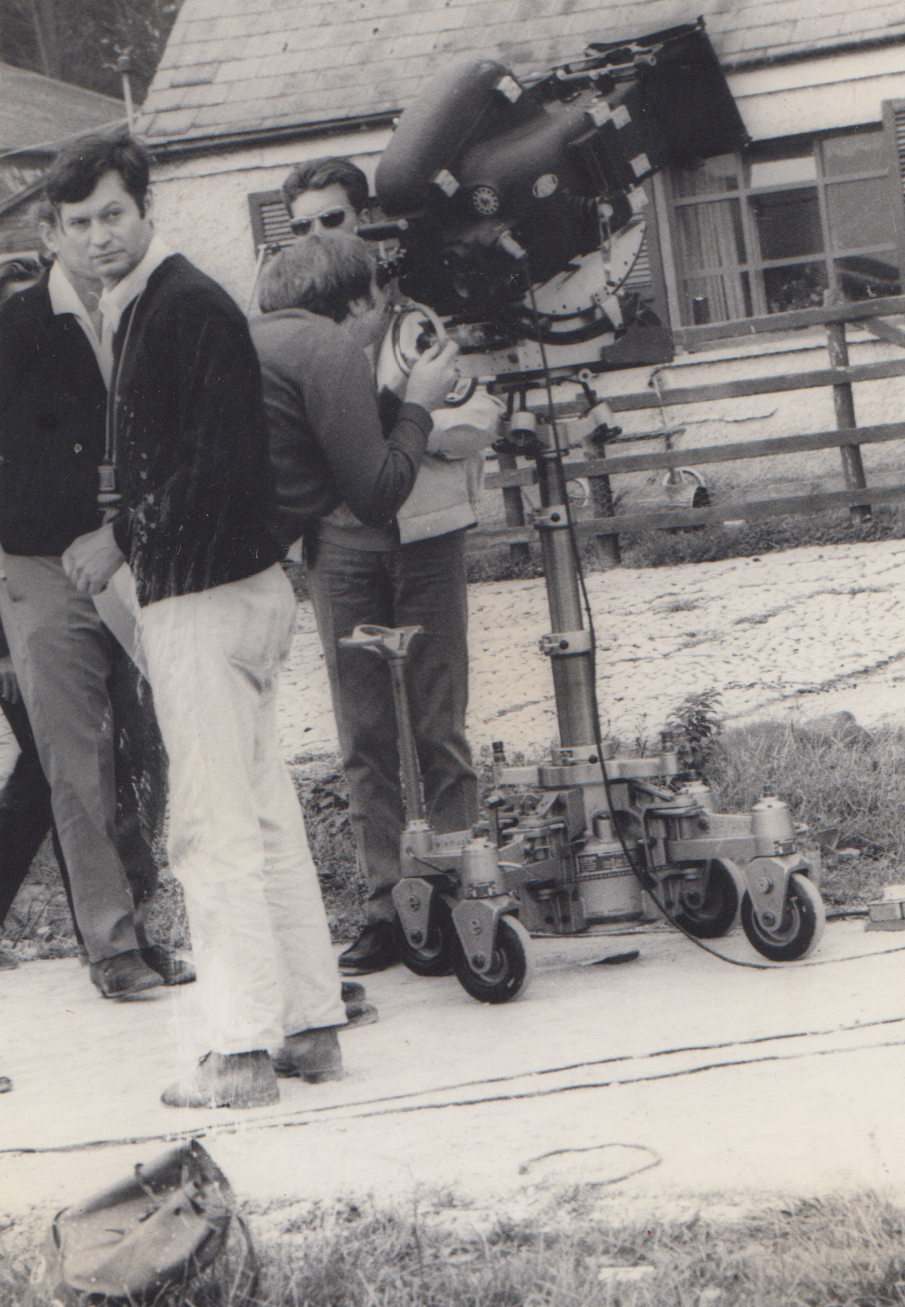
Roger Corman, Von Richthofen and Brown (1970)

== New opportunities ==
United Artists agreed to finance Corman's Red Baron project, although they asked that it emphasize American characters. Accordingly, it was filmed as Von Richthofen and Brown (1971), shot in Ireland in July 1970. There were several plane crashes during filming and one person died. Corman was going to make a film of Couples, a novel by John Updike for United Artists, and In from a script by Richard Schupe, but decided to take a break from directing. "Directing is very hard and very painful," he said in 1971. "Producing is easy. I can do it without really thinking about it."

== New World Pictures ==
In May 1970, Corman founded New World Pictures, which became a small independently owned production/distribution studio, immediately successful with Angels Die Hard (1970), a biker film, and The Student Nurses (1971), directed by Rothman. The Big Doll House (1971), directed by Jack Hill in the Philippines, was a big hit, making a star of Pam Grier. The company made a profit of $3.2 million in its first financial year, and Corman said all of his first eleven films were successful. Angels Die Hard led to a series of biker films, including Angels Hard as They Come (1971), produced by Jonathan Demme with Jack Fisk working as art director. Bury Me an Angel (1971) was the first biker movie directed by a woman, Barbara Peeters. Corman financed the directorial debuts of Curtis Hanson, Sweet Kill (1973), produced by Corman protégée Tamara Asseyev. Student Nurses led to a "cycle" of nurse pictures, including Private Duty Nurses (the first film directed by George Armitage), Night Call Nurses (1972) (the first feature directed by Jonathan Kaplan), The Young Nurses and Candy Stripe Nurses (1975). In the same vein were The Student Teachers (1973) and Summer School Teachers (1974). Big Doll House was followed by a series of women in prison pictures, such as Women in Cages (1972), The Hot Box (1972), Black Mama, White Mama (1973), The Arena (1974) (the first film directed by Steve Carver) and Caged Heat (1974) (the first film directed by Demme). Of New World's second year, Corman said 11 of the 12 releases were successful. Corman produced one more film for AIP, Boxcar Bertha (1972), the second feature directed by Martin Scorsese, starring David Carradine. He was executive producer for Unholy Rollers (1972) for AIP. A proposed political satire, The Wild Political Prank, was not made. He made I Escaped from Devil's Island (1973) with his brother.

One of Roger Corman's rare financial failures for New World was Cockfighter (1974), co-produced with Monte Hellman. "I thought it was an interesting, commercial film about the dark side of rural America," wrote Corman in his memoir. "To my knowledge, no one had ever made a picture about cockfighting. Now I know why. No one wants to see a picture about cockfighting." Corman's winning streak resumed with Big Bad Mama (1974), a gangster film directed by Carver and starring Angie Dickinson. It led to a follow-up, Crazy Mama (1975), produced by his wife and directed by Demme. In 1975, Corman said New World was "the most successful independent film company in the country...if you count AIP as a major". He said they were "the best of the cheap acts".

=== Distributing foreign films ===
In the 1970s, the major Hollywood studios were moving away from distributing foreign arthouse pictures, New World moved into the market and became the American distributor for Cries and Whispers (1972), directed by Ingmar Bergman. Corman bought it for $75,000 and it earned over $2 million at the U.S. box office. and Corman's distribution side of New World brought many foreign films to mass audiences in the U.S. for the first time – reportedly some played at drive-ins and grindhouses – including the works of François Truffaut (The Story of Adele H., Small Change), Peter Weir (The Cars That Ate Paris), Federico Fellini (Amarcord), Joseph Losey (The Romantic Englishwoman), Volker Schlöndorff (The Lost Honour of Katharina Blum, The Tin Drum) and Akira Kurosawa (Dersu Uzala). New World also released Fantastic Planet (1974).

In a 10-year period, New World Pictures won more Academy Awards for Best Foreign Film than all other studios combined.

=== 20th Century Fox ===
Corman had a four-picture deal with 20th Century Fox, making Capone (1975), Fighting Mad (1976) (directed by Demme), Moving Violation (1976) and Thunder and Lightning (1977). According to Filmink, "most of his Fox movies may as well have been made for Corman's own company, as I'm sure he himself realised."

=== Peak of New World ===
Death Race 2000 (1975), written by Robert Thom and directed by Paul Bartel, was a big hit, earning $4 million. It helped inspire a series of car chase movies: Cannonball (1976), directed by Bartel; Eat My Dust! (1976), directed by Griffith starring Ron Howard, which led to a follow-up, Grand Theft Auto (1977), Howard's directorial debut. Other films from the same period included The Great Texas Dynamite Chase (1976), Deathsport (1978), and Smokey Bites the Dust (1981).

New World's trailers were cut by Joe Dante and Alan Arkush. Corman gave them the chance to direct together, with Hollywood Boulevard (1976), which used outtakes from other New World films. It was successful enough for Corman to give both men jobs directing features on their own: Dante with Piranha (1978) and Arkush with Rock 'n' Roll High School (1979).

Piranha was written by John Sayles, who had been discovered by Corman's story editor, Frances Doel. Sayles later wrote The Lady in Red (1979) for Corman, which was directed by Lewis Teague and featured the first score by James Horner.

Other popular films around this time included Tidal Wave (1975), a Japanese film to which Corman added some extra footage, and Jackson County Jail (1976). He also financed I Never Promised You a Rose Garden. Less popular was Avalanche (1979), a disaster film directed by Corey Allen, which only grossed $87,000 on a budget of $6.5 million.

For Universal, he made Fast Charlie... the Moonbeam Rider (1979), directed by Carver. He produced Bogdanovich's Saint Jack (1979).

Corman was criticized when he insisted on the addition of footage featuring a rape for Humanoids from the Deep (1980). Similarly, in Galaxy of Terror, as noted on Schlock and Awe...some, "Corman promised the investors that the film would feature a Taaffe O'Connell sex-scene and a gruesome death-scene as-well. To save time, Corman put the two together. The actress agreed to a nude scene, but NOT a rape scene. Corman isn't the kind of man who takes no for an answer, and after some contract renegotiation, O'Connell agreed to being raped to death by a giant worm-monster. Money... it does amazing things."

The success of Star Wars inspired New World's most expensive film yet, Battle Beyond the Stars (1981). This film required extensive special effects, prompting Corman to buy a movie studio in Main Street Venice for $1.5 million. Corman made a TV film for CBS, The Georgia Peaches (1980).

Battle Beyond the Stars was so successful Corman had its footage and music score reused in other films such as Galaxy of Terror (1981) and Forbidden World (1982).

Corman picked up a film called The Personals (1983) that enjoyed success.

=== Millennium Films ===
Corman sold New World Pictures in January 1983 to a consortium of three lawyers for $16.9 million.

Under the terms of the contract, he agreed to stay on as a consultant for two years and to provide New World with at least five films they could release. New World agreed to distribute all of Corman's films until March 1984. He set up a new production company, Millennium – the title of which was taken from the name of a 1981 retrospective of Corman's work at the National Film Theatre in London. He announced plans to make films budgeted between $2–5 million using cash from his sale of New World to finance personally. He announced an intention to make fewer commercial films, movies more like I Never Promised You a Rose Garden and Cries and Whispers.

Millennium's films included Space Raiders (1983), a science fiction epic using footage and music from Battle Beyond the Stars; Love Letters (1983), a serious drama from Amy Holden Jones; Screwballs (1984), a sex comedy in the vein of Porky's; Suburbia (1984), directed by Penelope Spheeris, which he acquired, Deathstalker; and Kain of Dark Planet (which became The Warrior and the Sorceress). Deathstalker was made through Corman's old company, Palo Alto Productions; it was the first in a series of sword and sorcery films he did in Argentina. Corman would ultimately make nine co-productions in Argentina with a local production company, Aries.

== New Horizons ==
Corman says people struggled with the name "Millennium" – "nobody could spell it, nobody knew what it meant" – so he changed it to New Horizons by early 1984.

Corman and the new owners of New World ended up suing each other in March 1985. Corman claimed that New World failed to honor their guarantee to distribute his movies at a fee of 15%. He sought $400 million in damages and the return of the company. He said they refused to distribute School Spirit (1985) and Wheels of Fire. He also claimed that New World cheated him distributing Space Raiders, Screwballs and Slumber Party Massacre. New World sued Corman in return, claiming he was seeking to return to distribution, and was discrediting New World to potential investors. They said Corman bypassed New World for some of his films, such as Columbia's Hardbodies (1984). Corman argued, "My whole point in selling was to free myself of the burden of running the company and to get guaranteed distribution. If I can't get my guaranteed distribution, I'm forced to go back to running the company."

=== Concorde Pictures ===
The case with New World settled out of court. In March 1985 Corman announced he would establish a new distribution "cooperative", Concorde Pictures, where producers could get relatively cheap distribution from Concorde in exchange for contributing to the company's overhead. Their first releases were Corman productions School Spirit, Wheels of Fire and Barbarian Queen. Concorde later merged with a low-budget production company, Cinema Group, and announced plans to make 15–20 films a year. The first release between Cinema Release and Concorde was Streetwalkin', a more serious drama from Joan Freeman.

Early Concorde releases also include Loose Screws (1985), a sequel to Screwballs; Cocaine Wars (1986), the first in a series of movies Corman would finance in South America; Hour of the Assassin (1987), shot in Peru and the first film directed by Luis Llosa; and Munchies (1987), a spoof of Gremlins directed by Tina Hirsch.

Corman also remade Not of this Earth (1988) and released Big Bad Mama II (1987), and Transylvania Twist (1989); all three were directed by Jim Wynorski. He produced another version of Masque of the Red Death (1989), directed by Larry Brand. He produced Sweet Revenge (1987), Slumber Party Massacre II (1988), directed by Deborah Brock, Andy Colby's Incredible Adventure (1988), also directed by Brock, and The Terror Within (1989), directed by Thierry Notz. Corman financed the early directorial efforts of Carl Franklin (Nowhere to Run (1989)), Vargas Llosa and Katt Shea (Stripped to Kill (1988), Stripped to Kill II (1989)). More experimental was Nightfall (1988). After Hour of the Assassin, he made a series of films in Peru, including Crime Zone (1989), also directed by Luis Llosa, and Full Fathom Five (1990), directed by Carl Franklin. Concorde had a big hit with Bloodfist (1989), starring Don "the Dragon" Wilson which cost $1 million and earned over $6 million. Concorde signed Wilson to a long-term contract and he made a number of sequels for the company, including Bloodfist II and Fighting to Win.

=== Return to directing ===
Corman returned to directing once more with Frankenstein Unbound (1990). In 1990, Concorde sued MGM for $6 million. Concorde's films included Overexposed (1990), The Unborn (1991), and In the Heat of Passion (1992). They had a big hit with Carnosaur (1993), which led to several sequels. He financed Fire on the Amazon (1991, directed Luis Llosa) which had Sandra Bullock and Craig Sheffer in early roles.

Corman had to deal with the decline of the drive-in market and studio competition through the 1990s, but Concorde-New Horizons still made 15–24 pictures a year. This included The Fantastic Four (1994), based on the Marvel Comics superhero team of the same name. Fantastic Four co-creator Stan Lee claimed that the film was made solely for the producer, Bernd Eichinger, and his production company, Constantin Films, to retain the film rights. Avi Arad, a Marvel executive at the time, disputes this and contends that he offered Corman & Eichinger "a couple million dollars" to never release the film in order to protect the image of the characters; this version was supported by both Corman & Eichinger. The Fantastic Four was never officially released, though bootleg recordings have made the rounds over the years, and the film is available for free on YouTube and DailyMotion. The film's troubled production was the subject of a feature documentary, Doomed!: The Untold Story of Roger Corman's The Fantastic Four, released in 2015.

=== Roger Corman Presents ===
In 1995, Corman was executive producer on Roger Corman Presents, a special series of 13 movies for Showtime with budgets of around $1.5 million each. "I think the Corman name means action, humor and some titillation," says Mike Elliott, the producer of the series. "It's going to deliver the goods – and it will have a little moral statement in there as well." Corman ended up doing a second season of 11 movies. The films were Bram Stoker's Burial of the Rats, Hellfire, Virtual Seduction, Suspect Device, Unknown Origin, Terminal Virus, Where Evil Lies, Vampirella, Shadow of a Scream, Subliminal Seduction, House of the Damned (a.k.a. Spectre), The Haunted Sea, Alien Avengers (a.k.a. Aliens Among Us) and its sequel, Inhumanoid, Sawbones, Not Like Us, and Last Exit to Earth. He created his own comic book franchise, Black Scorpion, which led to a sequel and later a TV series. Corman also executive-produced remakes of The Wasp Woman, Humanoids from the Deep, A Bucket of Blood (a.k.a. The Death Artist), Piranha and Not of this Earth.

Concorde set up operations in Ireland as Concorde Anois, building studios in Connemara, County Galway. He received some support from the Irish government, a decision which became controversial when the content of some Corman productions such as Criminal Affairs was criticized in the press.

Later Concorde-New Horizons films included Overdrive (1997). "The genres still hold", said Corman in 1997, "action adventure, the suspense thriller, science fiction and horror. The difference is that they are bigger and better now. " Corman also produced the film Moving Target which was filmed in County Galway. It was his last film produced with Concorde-New Horizons.

== Other ventures ==
=== Roger Corman's Cosmic Comics ===
Corman operated a short-lived comic book imprint in 1995–1996 called Roger Corman's Cosmic Comics. It produced comics based on his films, written and drawn in a similar no-holds-barred style. Titles included Bram Stoker's Burial of the Rats, Caged Heat 3000, Death Race 2020, Welcome to The Little Shop of Horrors, and Rock & Roll High School — the latter featuring the Melvins (instead of the Ramones). Notable creators published by Cosmic Comics included Trevor Goring, James Kochalka, Jason Lutes, Pat Mills, Shane Oakley, Jerry Prosser, and J. R. Williams. The longest-running title was Death Race 2020, which lasted eight issues — but was left unfinished when the company closed down.

=== Syfy channel ===
Corman continued to produce creature films, such as Raptor (2001, dir Jim Wynorski). Dinocroc (2004), which aired on the Syfy cable television channel and was popular enough for two sequels, Supergator and Dinocroc vs. Supergator (2010), as well as a spin-off film, Dinoshark (2010). Supergator (2007) was turned down by the Syfy channel, but Corman made it anyway.

Corman also continued to make action films: Escape from Afghanistan (2001) was a Russian film, Peshavar Waltz plus some additional footage; The Hunt for Eagle One (2006) and The Hunt for Eagle One: Crash Point (2006) were shot in the Philippines; Roger Corman's Operation Rogue (2014); Fist of the Dragon (2015).

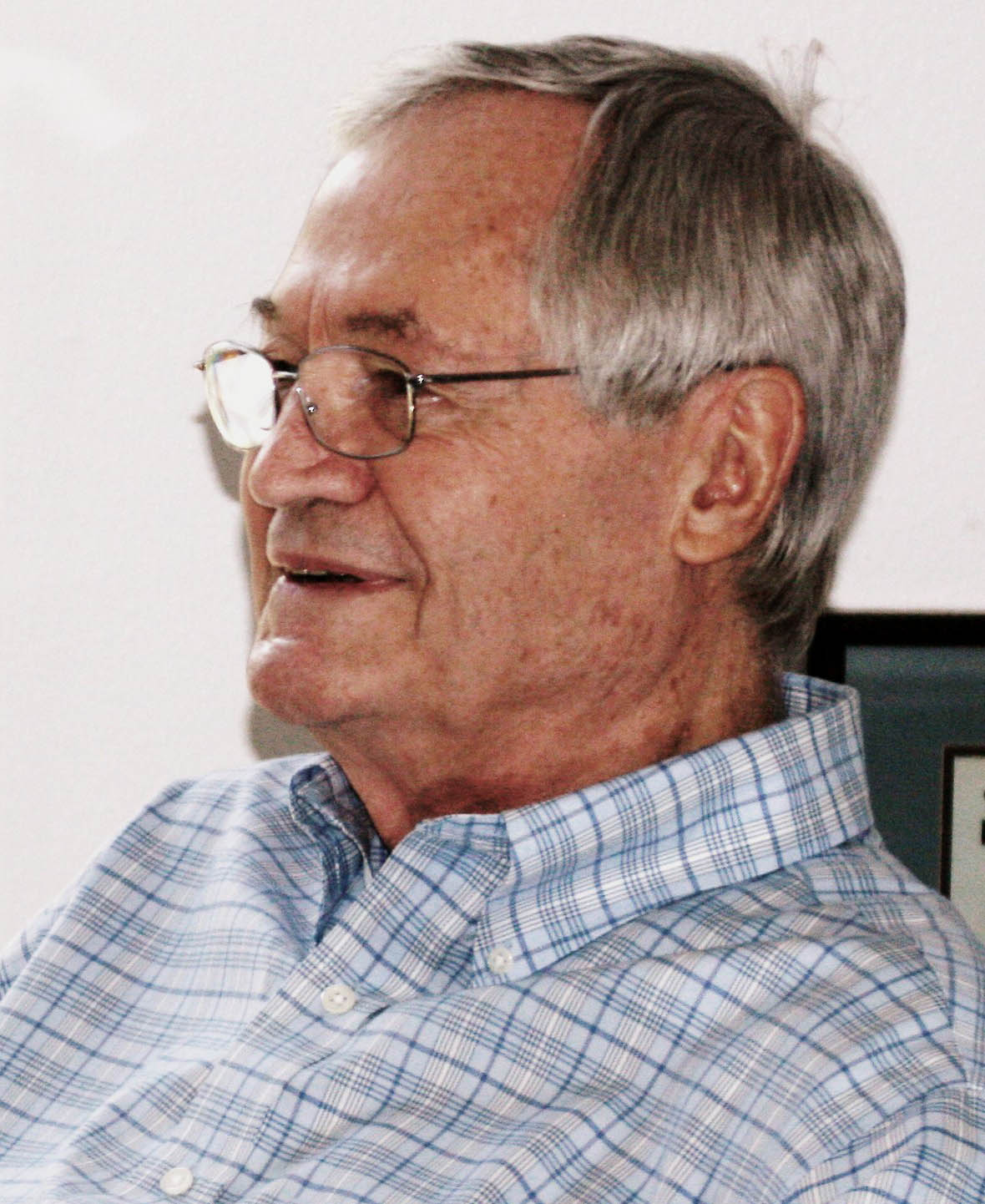
Corman in 2006

In 2006, Corman said he made 60% of his films overseas. "These foreign countries are offering subsidies that are so great that not only I but many independent producers are moving overseas", he said. He sold the remake rights of Death Race 2000 to Universal, who made Death Race (2008) with Jason Statham, with Corman credited as executive producer. It led to two direct-to-video prequels and one direct-to-video sequel.

In 2009, Corman produced and directed alongside director Joe Dante the web series Splatter for Netflix. The protagonist of the film is portrayed by Corey Feldman, and the story talks of the haunting tale of rock-and-roll legend Johnny Splatter. He also started contributing trailer commentaries to Dante's web series Trailers from Hell. In 2011, Corman cited James Cameron's Avatar (2009) and Christopher Nolan's Inception (2010) as examples of "great imagination and originality".

By now, the SyFy channel was Corman's leading market. For them, he made Sharktopus (2010) and Piranhaconda (2012). Corman produced the 2017 film Death Race 2050, a sequel to the 1975 film Death Race 2000. It was made with Universal, Corman's first film with a major studio in more than two decades.

== Filmography ==
Selected credits:

- It Conquered the World
- A Bucket of Blood
- The Little Shop of Horrors
- The Corman-Poe Cycle
- X: The Man with the X-ray Eyes
- The Wild Angels
- The Trip (1967 film)
- The St. Valentine's Day Massacre
- Death Race 2000
- Death Race (2008 film)
- Death Race 2
- Death Race 3: Inferno
- Death Race 2050
- Death Race: Beyond Anarchy
- Piranha 3D
- CobraGator

=== Roger Corman's Cult Classics ===
In 2010, Roger Corman teamed up New Horizons Pictures with Shout! Factory to release new DVD and Blu-ray editions of Corman productions under the name Roger Corman's Cult Classics. The releases have concentrated on 1970–1980s films he produced through New World rather than directed. These titles include Rock 'n' Roll High School, Death Race 2000, Galaxy of Terror, Forbidden World, Big Bad Mama, Big Bad Mama II, The Terror Within, Deathsport, Time Walker, The Unborn and Piranha, with additional titles continuing to be released.

== Favorite films ==
In 2022, Corman participated in the Sight & Sound film polls of that year. It is held every ten years to select the greatest films of all time, by asking contemporary directors to select ten films of their choice.

Corman's selections were:

- Chinatown (1974)
- Citizen Kane (1941)
- Dr. Strangelove (1964)
- The Godfather (1972)
- La dolce vita (1960)
- Lawrence of Arabia (1962)
- Rashomon (1950)
- The Seventh Seal (1957)
- The Tin Drum (1979)
- War and Peace (1967)

== Personal life and death ==
Corman was married to Julie Halloran from 1970 until his death. They had four children. Corman died at his home in Santa Monica, California, on May 9, 2024, at the age of 98.

When Corman's death was announced by his family on Corman's official Instagram account, his sons were not mentioned in the announcement: "He is survived by his wife Julie and his daughters Catherine and Mary.... A devoted and selfless father, he was deeply loved by his daughters."

=== Legal issues ===
In 2009, Corman was sued by his sons, who claimed they had been unfairly fired from the family production business after raising questions about the family trust.

In 2016, Corman alleged in litigation he was owed $170 million against a financial planner.

In 2018, Corman and his wife were sued by their sons over the sale of Corman's film library. This case was reportedly settled in February 2020. "It's settled and over," said Corman at the time.

== Awards, recognition, and legacy ==
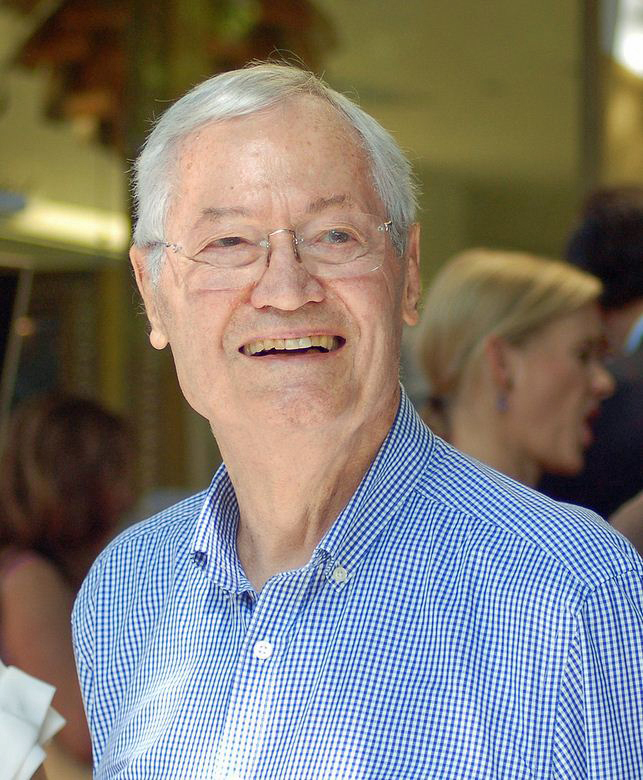
Corman in 2012

In 1964, Corman was the youngest producer/director to be given a retrospective at the Cinémathèque Française, as well as retrospectives at the British Film Institute and the Museum of Modern Art. Corman won the Lifetime Achievement Award at Stockholm International Film Festival in 1990. Corman was the subject of the 1978 documentary Roger Corman: Hollywood's Wild Angel, produced and directed by Christian Blackwood. Portions of the film reappeared in 2011's Corman's World. He won the first Producer's Award ever given by the Cannes Film Festival in 1998.

Corman received the David O. Selznick Award from the Producers Guild of America in 2006. That same year, his film Fall of the House of Usher was among the twenty-five movies selected for the National Film Registry, a compilation of significant films being preserved by the Library of Congress. The Academy of Motion Picture Arts and Sciences awarded Corman with an Academy Honorary Award at the inaugural Governors Awards, on November 14, 2009.

In 2010, writer and actor Mark Gatiss interviewed Corman for his BBC documentary series A History of Horror, of which the second half of the second episode focuses on Corman.

In 2010, Corman was inducted into the Beverly Hills High School Hall of Fame. In 2012, he was honored with the Filmmaker on the Edge Award at the Provincetown International Film Festival. He received the Extraordinary Contribution to Film Award at the Austin Film Festival in 2018. In 2019, he received the Lifetime Achievement Award at Fantaspoa Festival in Porto Alegre, Brazil.

Corman was a member of numerous organizations such as the Academy of Motion Picture Arts and Sciences, and the Producers Guild of America as well as New World Pictures, New Concorde, and American International Pictures. Film elements and prints for many movies directed, produced, and/or distributed by Corman are held at the Academy Film Archive as part of the New Horizons Collection. The Academy Film Archive restored Corman's film The Masque of the Red Death in 2019.

=== The Corman Film School ===
A number of noted filmmakers (including directors, producers, writers, and cinematographers) have worked with Corman, usually early in their careers, including Francis Ford Coppola, Martin Scorsese, Ron Howard, Polly Platt, Peter Bogdanovich, Declan O'Brien, Armondo Linus Acosta, Paul Bartel, Jonathan Demme, Donald G. Jackson, Gale Anne Hurd, Carl Colpaert, Joe Dante, James Cameron, John Sayles, Monte Hellman, Carl Franklin, George Armitage, Jonathan Kaplan, George Hickenlooper, Curtis Hanson, Jack Hill, Robert Towne, Menahem Golan, James Horner, and Timur Bekmambetov. Many have said that Corman's influence taught them some of the ins and outs of filmmaking. In the extras for the DVD of The Terminator, director James Cameron asserts, "I trained at the Roger Corman Film School." The British director Nicolas Roeg served as the cinematographer on The Masque of the Red Death. Cameron, Coppola, Demme, Hanson, Howard and Scorsese have all gone on to win Academy Awards. Howard was reportedly told by Corman, "If you do a good job on this film, you'll never have to work for me again."

Actors who obtained their career breaks working for Corman include Jack Nicholson, Peter Fonda, Bruce Dern, Charles Bronson, Todd Field, Michael McDonald, Dennis Hopper, Tommy Lee Jones, Talia Shire, Sandra Bullock, Robert De Niro, and David Carradine, who received one of his first starring film roles in the Corman-produced Boxcar Bertha (1972) and went on to star in Death Race 2000 (along with Sylvester Stallone). Many of Corman's protegés have paid their mentor homage by awarding him cameos in films, such as in The Godfather Part II, The Silence of the Lambs, Apollo 13, and as recently as the Demme film Rachel Getting Married (2008).

| Name | First Corman film | Year | Credited as |
|---|---|---|---|
| Allan Arkush | Hollywood Boulevard (1976 film) | 1976 | director, producer |
| George Armitage | Gas-s-s-s | 1970 | writer, associate producer, cast member |
| Paul Bartel | Death Race 2000 | 1975 | director |
| Timur Bekmambetov | The Arena | 2001 | director |
| Peter Bogdanovich | Voyage to the Planet of Prehistoric Women | 1968 | director, cast member |
| James Cameron | Battle Beyond the Stars | 1980 | art direction, visual effects |
| Francis Ford Coppola | Battle Beyond the Sun | 1962 | director (scenes in American version) |
| Joe Dante | Hollywood Boulevard | 1976 | co-director, editor |
| Jon Davison | Night Call Nurses | 1972 | assistant to director |
| Jonathan Demme | Angels Hard as They Come | 1971 | writer, producer |
| Todd Field | Eye of the Eagle 2: Inside the Enemy | 1989 | actor |
| Carl Franklin | Eye of the Eagle 2: Inside the Enemy | 1989 | actor, writer, director |
| Mark Goldblatt | Eat My Dust! | 1976 | production assistant, associate editor |
| Curtis Hanson | The Dunwich Horror | 1970 | co-writer |
| Monte Hellman | Beast from Haunted Cave | 1959 | director |
| Jack Hill | The Terror | 1963 | writer |
| James Horner | The Lady in Red | 1979 | composer |
| Ron Howard | Grand Theft Auto | 1977 | director, co-writer |
| Gale Anne Hurd | Humanoids from the Deep | 1980 | production assistant |
| Janusz Kamiński | Saturday the 14th Strikes Back | 1988 | gaffer, chief lighting technician, cinematographer |
| Jonathan Kaplan | Night Call Nurses | 1972 | director, editor |
| Dick Miller | Apache Woman | 1955 | actor |
| Jack Nicholson | The Little Shop of Horrors | 1960 | actor |
| Phedon Papamichael | Dance of the Damned | 1988 | cinematographer |
| Nicolas Roeg | The Masque of the Red Death | 1964 | cinematographer |
| John Sayles | Piranha | 1978 | writer |
| Martin Scorsese | Boxcar Bertha | 1972 | director |
| Katt Shea | Stripped to Kill | 1987 | writer, director, cast member |
| Robert Towne | Last Woman on Earth | 1960 | writer, cast member |
| Irvin Kershner | Stakeout on Dope Street | 1958 | director, writer |

== Written works ==
- Corman, Roger; Jerome, Jim (1990). How I Made a Hundred Movies in Hollywood and Never Lost a Dime. Random House. ISBN 978-0-394-56974-1. OCLC 840687965. His autobiography, which documents his experiences in the film industry.

== Documentaries ==
- Corman's World: Exploits of a Hollywood Rebel (2011), directed by Alex Stapleton, with the participation of Roger Corman, Martin Scorsese, Robert De Niro, Jack Nicholson, and William Shatner, distributed by Anchor Bay Films. Premiered at the Sundance Film Festival.
- Roger Corman: The Pope of Pop Cinema (2020), directed by Bertrand Tessier, with the participation of Roger Corman, Ron Howard, Joe Dante, and Peter Bogdanovich, produced by California Prod. Best documentary at Beverly Hills Film Festival.

== Bibliography ==
- Di Franco, J. Philip, The Movie World of Roger Corman (New York: Chelsea House, 1979)
- Laroni, Giulio, Il cinema secondo Corman. Intervista allo scopritore di Francis Ford Coppola, Martin Scorsese, James Cameron (Milano: Biblion Edizioni, 2016)
- Nasr, Constantine (ed.), Roger Corman: Interviews (Jackson: University Press of Mississippi, 2011)
- Price, Robert M., "Cormanghast: The Poe Films of Roger Corman". Parts 14 (November 1997), 3–14, 20.
- Routt, William D. (1994). O'Regan, Tom; Miller, Toby (eds.). "Art, popular art". Continuum: The Australian Journal of Media & Culture. 7 (2). "In 1990 Corman published an autobiography, written in collaboration with Jim Jerome, How I Made a Hundred Movies in Hollywood and Never Lost a Dime and thereby, unwittingly, joined my act."
- Silver, Alain (2006). Roger Corman: Metaphysics on a Shoestring. Los Angeles: Silman-James Press.
- Will, David and Willemen, Paul, Roger Corman: The Millennic Vision (Edinburgh: Edinburgh Film Festival, 1970)
