= Joanna Pacuła =

Polish–American actress (born 1957)

- Born: 30 December 1957 (age 68); Tomaszów Lubelski, Poland
- Education: Aleksander Zelwerowicz State Theatre Academy
- Occupations: Actress; model
- Years active: 1977–present
- Known for: Gorky Park
- Height: 175 cm (5 ft 9 in)

Joanna Pacuła (Polish: [jɔˈanna paˈt͡suwa]; born 30 December 1957) is a Polish actress and model. Born in Tomaszów Lubelski, she immigrated to the United States in the early 1980s, and first gained prominence through her modeling work for Vogue. Her breakthrough performance in the 1983 film Gorky Park earned her a Golden Globe nomination for Best Supporting Actress. In the years since, she established herself as a character actress, appearing in numerous high-profile films and television series.

== Early life ==
Pacuła was born in Tomaszów Lubelski, Poland, to a pharmacist mother and an engineer father. She has a sister, Ewa Pacuła, a model and TV personality who has also worked in the United States. In addition to her native Polish, Pacuła is also fluent in Russian and English.

== Career ==
In 1979, Pacuła graduated from the Aleksander Zelwerowicz State Theatre Academy. After graduation, she joined the Warsaw Dramatic Theatre, where she acted until 1981. She began her career playing in productions of Shakespeare's Romeo and Juliet, Othello, and As You Like It. She also found work in a few films, including Krzysztof Zanussi's Camouflage (Barwy ochronne, 1977) and Sergiu Nicolaescu's Last Night of Love (Ultima noapte de dragoste, 1980) in Romania.

In 1981, Pacuła was in Paris when the communist authorities in Poland declared martial law. She did not return to her homeland, and in 1982 immigrated to the United States, first settling in New York City, where she began studying and eventually became fluent in English. She subsequently relocated to Los Angeles to establish a career in English-speaking films. Her feature debut came in appearing opposite William Hurt in Gorky Park (1983). She was praised by Roman Polanski for that role. She played in numerous American TV series and movies, including the Holocaust drama Escape From Sobibor (CBS, 1987), The Kiss (1988), E.A.R.T.H. Force (CBS, 1990), and the TV series, The Colony (ABC, 1996). She also starred in Lewis Gilbert's Not Quite Paradise released in 1985.

She was featured in Marked for Death (1990) as an expert on Jamaican voodoo and gangs; in the Italian erotic thriller Husband and Lovers (1992) as a free-spirited adultress; Tombstone (1993) as Doc Holliday's lover, Kate; in The Haunted Sea (1997); and in the film Virus (1999), playing a Russian scientist. She currently resides in Southern California.

== Personal life ==
Pacula began dating film producer Hawk Koch in 1983, after he cast her in Gorky Park on the recommendation of Roman Polanski. They later separated.

== Recognition ==
In 1984 she was nominated for a Golden Globe for Best Supporting Actress for her performance in Gorky Park.

She was listed as one of 12 "Promising New Actors of 1984" in John Willis's Screen World, volume 36.

== Filmography ==
Film

- Ultima noapte de dragoste (1980) – Lena Gheorghiu
- Czułe miejsca (1981) – Nurse
- Gorky Park (1983) – Irina Asanova
- Not Quite Paradise (1985) – Gila
- Escape from Sobibor (1987) – Luka
- Death Before Dishonor (1987) – Elli Gellar
- The Kiss (1988) – Felice
- Sweet Lies (1988) – Joelle
- Options (1989) – Princess Nicole
- Breaking Point (1989) – Anna/Diana
- Marked for Death (1990) – Professor Leslie
- Husband and Lovers (1991) – Alina
- Eyes of the Beholder (1992) – Diana Carlyle
- Body Puzzle (1992) – Tracy Marella
- Black Ice (1992) – Vanessa
- Warlock: The Armageddon (1993) – Paula Dare
- Under Investigation (1993) – Abbey Jane Strong
- Tombstone (1993) – Kate Elder
- Private Lessons II (1993) – Sophie Morgan
- The Silence of the Hams (1994) – Lily Wine
- Every Breath (1994) – Lauren
- Not Like Us (1995) – Anita Clark
- Timemaster (1995) – Evelyn Adams
- Last Gasp (1995) – Nora Weeks
- Captain Nuke and the Bomberboys (1995) – Brenda Franelli
- The Haunted Sea (1997) – Bergen
- Heaven Before I Die (1997) – Selma
- In Praise of Older Women (1997) – Marta
- The White Raven (1998) – Julie Konnenman
- My Giant (1998) – Lilliana Rotaru
- The Art of Murder (1999) – Elizabeth Sheridan
- Virus (1999) – Nadia
- Error in Judgement (1999) – Liz
- Crash and Byrnes (2000) – Lissette
- The Hit (2001) – Sonia
- Crusade of Vengeance (2002) – Elizabeth
- No Place Like Home (2002) – Gretchen Klein
- Cupid's Prey (2003) – Iris Wharton
- El Padrino (2004) – Jessica Lancaster
- Moscow Heat (2004) – Sasha
- Dead Easy (2004) – Teresa Storm
- The Cutter (2005) – Elizabeth Teller
- Honor (2006) – Rose Tyrell
- Forget About It (2006) – Talia Nitti
- When Nietzsche Wept (2007) – Mathilda
- Shannon's Rainbow (2009) – Emily Blair
- Black Widow (2010) – Olivia
- ICE Agent (2013) – Sheila Hayman
- Break Even (2020) – Agent Crowe
- Buckle Up (2023) – Evelyn Elger

Television

- Deep Red (1994, television film) – Monica Quik
- Business for Pleasure (1997, television film) – Anna
- Sweet Deception (1998, television film) – Risa Gallagher
- Dead Man's Gun (1999, 1 episode) – Yvotte Ballinger
- Brutally Normal (2000, 7 episodes) – Gogi
- Night Visions (2001, 1 episode) – Head Immigrant
- Robbery Homicide Division (2002, 1 episode) – Trisha Sandifer
- Lightning Bolts of Destruction (2003, television film) – Dr. Valery Landis
- Dinocroc (2004, television film)
- Jake in Progress (2005, 1 episode) – Elsa Winters
- Monk (2008, 1 episode) – Leyla Zlatavich
- Stolen Child (2012, television film) – Tatiana
- Bones (2014, 1 episode) – Drina Mirga

== Awards and nominations ==
Awards
Year	Award	Category	Production	Result
1983	Golden Globe Awards	Golden Globe Award for Best Supporting Actress - Motion Picture	Gorky Park	Nominated
1988	Saturn Awards	Saturn Award for Best Actress	The Kiss	Nominated
