= Death Game (1996 film) =

1996 film

- Home video cover art
- Genre: Action; Adventure; Science Fiction
- Written by: Blain Brown
- Directed by: Randy Cheveldave
- Starring: Timothy Bottoms
- Music by: Daryl Bennett; Jim Guttridge
- Country of origin: United States
- Original language: English

Production
- Executive producer: Roger Corman
- Producer: Maurice Smith
- Production location: Vancouver
- Cinematography: Henry Chan
- Editors: Melinda Friedman; Robert L. Goodman
- Running time: 93 min.
- Production companies: Concorde-New Horizons; Maurice Smith Productions

Original release
- Release: September 21, 1996

Death Game is a 1996 American film which was part of the Roger Corman Presents series.

It was also known as Mortal Challenge.

== Plot ==
In the near future, teenagers are kidnapped and forced to fight cyborgs for the entertainment of the wealthy.

== Cast ==
- Timothy Bottoms as Jack
- David McCallum as Malius
- Evan Lurie as Grepp
- Alfonso Quijada as Freeze
- Vince Murdocco as Alex
- Nicholas Hill as Hawk
- Jody Thompson
- Kristina Copeland as Sheena
- Darren Choo as Kado
- Kim Calderone as Becca
- Douglas Smith as Tristan
