= UFO (American TV series) =

Television documentary series

- Genre: Documentary
- Country of origin: United States
- Original language: English
- No. of episodes: 4

Production
- Cinematography: Wolfgang Held
- Editors: Giacomo Ambrosini; Paul Crowder
- Production companies: Bad Robot; Sutter Road Picture Company; Zipper Bros Films

Original release
- Network: Showtime

UFO is a four-part television documentary series about unidentified flying objects, produced by J.J. Abrams' production company, Bad Robot. The series aired on Showtime in 2021.

== See also ==
- List of Showtime original programming
