= The Haunted Sea =

- Directed by: Dan Golden
- Written by: Thomas McKelvey Cleaver
- Produced by: Roger Corman
- Starring: Krista Allen; James Brolin; Joanna Pacula; Don Stroud
- Cinematography: John B. Aronson
- Edited by: Robert Berman
- Music by: Nigel Holton; David Wurst; Eric Wurst
- Production company: Concorde Pictures
- Distributed by: New Horizons Home Video
- Release date: November 17, 1997
- Running time: 73 minutes
- Country: United States
- Language: English

The Haunted Sea is a 1997 American horror film directed by Dan Golden, starring Krista Allen, James Brolin, Joanna Pacula and Don Stroud. It was originally intended as an installment of the television anthology Roger Corman Presents, but was rejected by the series' broadcaster and instead premiered on home video on November 11, 1997. It shares part of its title with Corman's 1961 film Creature from the Haunted Sea, but similarities are limited to the supernatural marine theme.

== Plot ==
Near the Yucatan Peninsula, Captain Ramsey's freighter finds the ship "Hades" drifting in the ocean, showing no apparent sign of life on board. Ramsey and his crew explore the Hades, while they are being observed by an unseen entity. In the cargo hold, they discover an ancient Aztec treasure, which gives second mate Medina flashbacks to a violent ritual. They also learn from the diary of the Hades' captain, Jameson, that the artefacts were retrieved from Montezuma's temple. Two of Ramsey's men, Delgado and Lane, attempt to plunder some of the treasure, but Delgado becomes possessed as a result. He transforms into a reptilian monster, mauls Lane to death, and sets about killing the rest of the crew.

In the kitchen, Medina discovers Jameson, traumatized but alive. The Hades' captain hints that he, too, fell under the treasure's evil influence and, while possessed, turned against his crew mates. To escape his predicament, he flees and commits suicide. Eventually, human presence on the Hades is whittled down to just Johnson and first mate Bergren. They rig the cursed ship with explosives. The monster kills Bergren, and Johnson jumps overboard just as the Hades is blown apart. She's rescued by the freighter, but is revealed to be possessed herself.

== Cast ==
- Krista Allen as 2nd Mate Johnson
- Don Stroud as Chief Foster
- Duane Whitaker as Andy Delgado
- Jeff Phillips as Charlie Lane
- James Brolin as Captain Ramsey
- Joanna Pacula as 1st Mate Bergren
- Ronald William Lawrence as Marcus Talbot
- Eb Lottimer as Doug Ward
- Leonard Donato as Chief Engineer Anderson

== Production ==
The film was pitched internally as "Alien on water" and had the working title of Ghost Ship. It was eventually rebranded as Haunted Sea, a loose callback to the vintage Corman film Creature from the Haunted Sea. It was originally intended for inclusion in the television anthology Roger Corman Presents, which included several reimaginings of the B-movie mogul's classics, but had a troubled production. Glamour photographer-turned-director Dan Golden, who was responsible for two prior Presents installments, was brought onboard after another helmer departed the project. He was hesitant due to the script's poor quality. Corman allowed Golden to work on it with his usual story editor Frances Dole, but insisted the shoot start within ten days as planned. Filming took place in December 1996. That date coincided with a state of flux at Corman's studios, following the ousting of several staff members by the producer, which did not help matters.

Despite the film taking place at sea, there was no budget to actually shoot the actors in such surroundings. Corman demanded that ship sets from Carnosaur 3 be recycled, although Golden felt they were too limited for some scenes. They were later complemented with stock footage for exteriors. To link the sets with the story's supposed mesoamerican setting, the director tried to buy B-roll from the government of Mexico, but even that proved too expensive for the thrifty Corman. Since he had planned a holiday in Cancun, Golden simply brought a 16 mm camera and captured some establishing shots himself.

The creature was a dinosaur left from Carnosaur 2, outfitted with a different head by John Carl Buechler. Its mobility was severely limited, including the opening and closing of the mouth. Golden tried to film around it, but Corman insisted that the effects were satisfactory and that the creature should be shown more. Following her appearances as Emmanuelle, Krista Allen was not enthusiastic about the film's instances of nudity, and Golden acknowledged that the first such scene was not gracefully integrated into the picture. In the finished film, the director was credited as "Daniel Patrick", while effects man Buechler was credited only through the name of his company Magical Media Industries.

== Release ==
While the film was supposed to premiere on Showtime as part of the Roger Corman Presents collection, the channel's executives deemed its quality unacceptable and rejected it. Although this has not been acknowledged by either party, genre publication Psychotronic Video later posited that the third-party production When the Bullet Hits the Bone had been inserted into the series to help Corman satisfy his remaining television commitments.

The Haunted Sea therefore debuted on a VHS from Corman's own New Horizons Home Video on November 17, 1997. It eventually made its U.S. television debut on August 5, 1998, on The Movie Channel, a sister channel of Showtime. New Horizons re-issued The Haunted Sea on DVD on July 20, 2004.

== Reception ==
Writing for News Publications' TV Guide and Motion Picture Annual, Michael Gingold awarded the film one and a half star on a scale of one to five, and dismissed it as "a slackly directed pastiche of genre cliches, stock footage, and dialogue like 'It was like a nightmare, only I wasn't sleeping'", whose creature was reused from a prior film "with an especially new bogus head attached". Nathan Rabin of The A.V. Club derided the "less-than-horrifying monster, which resembles a midget trapped inside a cheap, store-bought dinosaur costume" but acknowledged that "the film is remarkably competent, aided by a relatively strong cast, professional if unremarkable direction by Dan Golden", adding that "it's at least a lasting testament to the remarkable thrift and monetary ingenuity of the folks over at the New Horizons stable."

Charles Tatum of eFilmCritic gave the film a single star on a scale of one to five, writing that the special effects "suck", the direction is "pretty bland, something to be expected when you are limited to three sets and reels of 1960s [sic] Mexico travelogue footage", and "not a whole lot makes sense". Ballantine Books' Video Movie Guide gave the film two stars on a scale of one to five, and summed up the film as "silliness on the high seas". VideoHound's Golden Movie Retriever, a Thomson Gale reference book, rated it a two on a scale of zero to four.
