= Terminal Virus =

- Directed by: Dan Golden
- Produced by: Roger Corman Cirio H. Santiago
- Starring: James Brolin
- Distributed by: Concorde Pictures
- Release date: October 3, 1995
- Country: United States
- Language: English

Terminal Virus is a 1995 American post-apocalyptic film directed by Dan Golden, produced by Roger Corman and Cirio H. Santiago and starring James Brolin. It is part of the Roger Corman Presents series. The movie was partly filmed in the Philippines and contains stock footage from other Cirio H. Santiago productions including The Sisterhood.
