= Last Exit to Earth =

1996 American television film

- Screenplay by: Katherine Martin; Katt Shea
- Story by: Rachel Samuels
- Directed by: Katt Shea
- Music by: Danny B. Harvey
- Country of origin: United States
- Original language: English

Production
- Producers: Darin Spillman; Roger Corman
- Cinematography: Hubert Taczanowski

Original release
- Release: 1996

Last Exit to Earth is a 1996 American television film directed by Katt Shea for Roger Corman. It stars Kim Greist and Costas Mandylor.

It aired as part of the Roger Corman Presents series on Showtime.

== Cast ==
- Kim Greist as Eve (credited as Kimberly Griest)
- Costas Mandylor as Jaid
- Amy Hathaway as Kali
- David Groh as Bendix
- Hilary Shepard as Lilith
- Michael Cudlitz as Hardester
- Lisa Banes as Elder
- JoNell Kennedy as Hera (credited as Jonell Kennedy)
- Zoe Trilling as Goldfinger
- Cedrick Terrell as Yost
- Rosemary Dunsmore as Delivery Room Doctor
- Lily Knight as Eppe
- Gregory Millar as Moorhouse
- Robert Peters as First Mate
- Katt Shea as Surgeon Athena

== Production ==
Shea had made a number of films for Roger Corman then had a hit with Poison Ivy. She said she received no offers after that movie so went back to work for Corman with this film.
