= Where Evil Lies =

- Directed by: Kevin Alber
- Produced by: Roger Corman
- Distributed by: Concorde Pictures
- Release date: 1995
- Country: United States
- Language: English

Where Evil Lies is a 1995 American erotic thriller film directed by Kevin Alber. It was part of the Roger Corman Presents series.

== Cast ==
- Nikki Fritz
- Melissa Park
- Emile Levisetti
- Mark Kinsey Stephenson
- Roma Court
- Ingrid Sthare
- Anna Lee
