= The Alien Within =

1995 film

- Home video cover art
- Directed by: Scott P. Levy
- Written by: Alex Simon
- Story by: Rob Kerchner
- Produced by: Mike Elliott executive Roger Corman
- Starring: Roddy McDowall; Alex Hyde-White; Melanie Shatner; Don Stroud
- Cinematography: Mike Mickens
- Edited by: John Bergstrasser
- Music by: Christopher Lennertz
- Release date: July 18, 1995 (US)
- Running time: 75 minutes
- Country: United States
- Language: English
- Budget: $4 million

The Alien Within is a 1995 horror science fiction film directed by Scott P. Levy and starring Roddy McDowall, Alex Hyde-White, Melanie Shatner, Don Stroud, and Richard Biggs. It was also known as Unknown Origin.

== Plot ==
At a future (2020) underwater mining platform, an alien parasite, dubbed the "vampire bug," plagues the crew of the platform.

== Production ==
Produced by Roger Corman as part of Roger Corman Presents.

== Reception ==
Creature Feature gave the movie 3 out of 5 stars. It found the movie to be a mixture of Trancers, Alien (film), The Abyss and The Thing (1982 film). It praised the script by Alex Simon for keeping the movie interesting. It was not as enamored with Scott Levy's direction.
