= Humanoids from the Deep (1996 film) =

- Home video cover art
- Directed by: Jeff Yonis
- Written by: Jeff Yonis
- Produced by: Roger Corman
- Starring: Emma Samms; Robert Carradine
- Music by: Christopher Lennertz; Ben McCain
- Production company: Concorde-New Horizons
- Distributed by: Concorde Pictures; Showtime (TV)
- Release date: September 14, 1996
- Running time: 86 minutes
- Country: United States
- Language: English

Humanoids from the Deep is a 1996 American science fiction horror film. It was a remake of Humanoids from the Deep and was part of Roger Corman Presents.

== Plot ==
The United States Army conducts experiments on death row inmates in an attempt to create the perfect amphibious soldier and the resulting man/fish hybrids escape to the open ocean. Over the next few days, several people are killed by being pulled into the sea and drowned.

In the nearby town of Harbor Shores, canning company Canco Industries is under fire from local environmentalists for dumping toxic chemicals into the harbor. When a Canco employee dies in an explosion, Kim Parker, whose father Wade works for Canco, alerts the Coast Guard. That night, Kim goes skinny-dipping with her friends and all but one are pulled under, where the humanoids keep the female victims in giant cocoons to use for mating purposes.

Wade heads to the Police Station to bail out Matt, the lone survivor who insists they were attacked by a monster. After Canco operatives attempt to kill Matt, he and Wade meet with genetic scientist Dr. Drake who tells them the truth about the Army program. Several more attacks follow and a local woman gives birth to a humanoid, which escapes into a storm drain.

When the Humanoids attack a fair at the docks, a group tracks it back to the underwater cave where the Humanoids have their nest. After a long fight, the lair is blown up with explosives. The next day, all the victims are given pregnancy tests. All come out negative, except for Dr. Drake, who goes into labor while in her car, suggesting the threat is not over.

== Cast ==
- Emma Samms as Dr. Drake
- Robert Carradine as Wade Parker
- Justin Walker as Matt
- Mark Rolston as Bill Taylor
- Danielle Weeks as Kim Parker
- Clint Howard as Deputy
- Kaz Garas as Sheriff Barnes
- Warren Burton as Major Knapp
- Bert Remsen as Duffy the Coroner
- Barry Nolan as Male Reporter #1
- Barabra Niven as Fran Taylor
- Season Hubley as Timmy's mother
- Greg Travis as Porter
- Walton Goggins as Rod
