= Hellfire (1995 film) =

- VHS cover art
- Screenplay by: Beverly Gray; David Hartwell; Tara McCann
- Story by: Louis Morneau
- Directed by: David Tausik
- Starring: Ben Cross
- Music by: Vladimir Komarov; Bruno Louchouarn
- Country of origin: United States
- Original language: English

Production
- Producers: Roger Corman; Anatoly Fradis
- Cinematography: Evgeniy Korzhenkov
- Editors: Brian L. Chambers; Mike Jackson
- Running time: 85 minutes
- Production companies: Concorde-New Horizons; Mosfilm; Etalon Film; Showtime Networks; The Pacific Trust

Original release
- Network: Showtime
- Release: January 23, 1995

Hellfire, also known as Blood Song, is a 1995 American made-for-television horror film directed by David Tausik and starring Ben Cross, Jennifer Burns and Beverly Garland. It was originally released as part of the Roger Corman Presents series. It was filmed in Russia.

== Plot ==
In XVIII century France, aristocratic composer Octave Barron writes a symphony for the Devil as part of a satanic pact. During his work Barron is "inspired" by the murders he commits with the help of his lover and maid, Carlotta. For his crimes and devil worshiping Barron is eventually discovered by the authorities and subsequently taken out of his mansion by an angry mob of townsfolk, who torn him apart with horses while Barron screams that his pact with the evil forces will resurrect him through his music.

Several years later, Barron's niece Gabriella (Jennifer Burns) inherits the estate and discovers his late uncle's hidden and unfinished symphony, as well as his piano. Believing that all the stories about her Barron are nothing more than superstition, she hires the church choir director and novice composer Marius (Ben Cross) to finish the symphony. Meanwhile the now old Carlotta, who avoided any suspicion upon her and is a secret practitioner of witchcraft, is contacted by her master's spirit from Hell, who directs Carlotta on how to bring him back in the body of Marius. Marius is possessed by Barron's evil spirit after he plays the latter's music on the piano, and murders two women for "inspiration" to finish the symphony, while Carlotta secretly helps him to escape and create alibis. Things get tense when Gabriella's fiancé Julien arrives, clashing with Marius and showing jealousy. Carlotta poisons Julien to make him extremely angry and as a result he tries to rape Gabriella and challenges Marius to a duel. During the duel, Marius again becomes possessed by Barron's spirit after hearing the symphony being played by Carlotta, and in that state he defeats and kills Julien.

Fearing for the worst, Marius tries to leave Gabriella's mansion, but before he does so Carlotta commits suicide, as instructed by Barron. Later, as Marius finishes the symphony, he's again possessed by Barron, while Gabriella is possessed by Carlotta's spirit. They have sex while their reflections show that they're possessed. Soon after Carlotta's spirit leaves Gabriella's body and she goes to Hell as punishment for her suicide and crimes, as Barron intended from the beginning. Barron plans to live in full control of Marius' body, but Gabriella confronts her uncle while the police and townspeople storm the place, seeking retribution for the third murder committed by Marius/Barron. A fight between the possessed Marius and Gabrielle ensues, and Marius regains consciousness just before the police and the townspeople arrive. Knowing that there is no escape from the mental and physical hold Barron has over him, Marius declares his love to Gabrielle and throws himself into the fireplace, burning alive, thus releasing the spirit of Barron from his body and tragically dying while saving his mind and soul.

Nevertheless, that very same night, when everyone but Gabriella has left the mansion, Barron resurrects his dead body and comes out of the grave. Gabriella realizes she and Marius forgot to destroy the symphony that powers Barron. She then manages to survive by burning the symphony and Barron's piano, while the helpless Barron can only sit and helplessly play a few last moments at the burning piano before finally dying, this time forever. The next day, Gabriella closes all the doors to the estate and travels alone. Briefly looking back, she leaves the place, never to return.

== Cast ==
- Ben Cross as Marius Carnot
- Jennifer Burns as Gabrielle Apollinaire
- Beverly Garland as Carlotta
- Doug Wert as Julien
- Lev Prygunov as Baron Jean Octavie / Octave Barron
- Vladimir Kuleshov as Tristan
- Yekaterina Rednikova as Yvette
- Irina Lachina as Young Carlotta
- Aleksandr Pyatkov as Constable
- Yelena Bardina as Louise
- Elena Kostina as Celeste
- Vasily Rybin as 1st Deputy (as Vasiliy Rybin)
- Gleb Plaksin as Henri (as Gleb Plaxin)
- Vladimir Vozhenikov as The Archbishop
- Pavel Ostroukhov as Young Priest
- Svetlana Andropova as 1st Prostitute
