= Daniel Sousa (director) =

Portuguese short film director

- Occupation: director
- Years active: 2000–present

Daniel Sousa is a Portuguese short film director. Sousa and fellow producer Dan Golden were nominated for a 2014 Academy Award for Best Animated Short Film for the film Feral.

Sousa is an alumnus of the Rhode Island School of Design (RISD), where he teaches animation.
