= Inhumanoid =

- Home video cover art
- Directed by: Victoria Muspratt
- Written by: Victoria Muspratt
- Produced by: Darin Spillman co-producer Marta M Mobley executive Roger Corman; Lance H Robbins
- Starring: Richard Grieco; Lara Harris; Corbin Bernsen; Edie McClurg
- Music by: Marco Beltrami
- Distributed by: Concorde Pictures
- Release date: 1996
- Country: United States
- Language: English
- Budget: $700,000

Inhumanoid (also known as Circuit Breaker) is a 1996 American film, written and directed by Victoria Muspratt. It was part of the Roger Corman Presents series on Showtime.

== Plot ==
A family of three is travelling in space, when they encounter a spaceship with one survivor. They discover the rest of the people on the ship were killed, and the survivor turns out to be an emotionally unstable android programmed without morals.

== Cast ==
- Richard Grieco as Adam
- Lara Harris as Katrina Carver
- Corbin Bernsen as Foster Carver
- Edie McClurg as Dr. Marianne Snow
- Robin Gammell as Dr. Milton
- Brittany Ashton Holmes as Amy Carver

== Production ==
The film was written and directed by Victoria Muspratt, a Canadian short film maker who worked as the assistant to the director of development. She wanted to direct but Corman did not think women would make good action directors. She shot a short film made with an insurance payout and persuaded Corman. The film was shot over 18 days with a budget of US$700,000. It was pitched as Dead Calm in space. Muspratt said, "I hope to make four or five more features with Roger’s `graduate film school,’ then, I plan to be the next Francis Ford Coppola."
