= Sawbones (film) =

- VHS cover art
- Written by: Sam Montgomery
- Directed by: Catherine Cyran
- Starring: Adam Baldwin; Nina Siemaszko; Barbara Carrera
- Music by: The Russel Sprouts
- Country of origin: United States
- Original language: English

Production
- Executive producer: Roger Corman
- Producer: Mike Elliott
- Cinematography: Christopher Baffa
- Running time: 85 minutes
- Production company: New Horizons Picture Corp

Original release
- Network: Showtime
- Release: July 25, 1995

Sawbones (also known as Prescription for Murder) is a 1995 American made for television horror film which was part of the Roger Corman Presents series.

== Plot ==
A horror story about an intern who failed medical school... but never gave up surgery.

== Cast ==
- Adam Baldwin as Detective Burt Miller
- Nina Siemaszko as Jenny Sloan
- Barbara Carrera as Rita Baldwin
- Don Stroud as Captain Mowbray
- Don Harvey as Willy Knapp
- Nicholas Sadler as Brad Fraser

== Reception ==
Fangoria said: "[...] it’s a fairly pedestrian genre expedition, sure, but it certainly accomplishes what it sets out to do and is a super fun way to kill an hour and a half."
