= Spectre (1996 film) =

- Directed by: Scott Levy
- Screenplay by: Brendan Broderick
- Story by: Victoria Muspratt
- Produced by: Mary Ann Fisher; Roger Corman
- Starring: Greg Evigan; Alexandra Paul; Briana Evigan
- Cinematography: Christopher Baffa
- Edited by: John Gilbert
- Music by: Christopher Lennertz
- Production companies: New Concorde; Transpacific Corp.
- Distributed by: Concorde Anois
- Release date: July 13, 1996
- Running time: 83 minutes
- Country: United States
- Language: English

Spectre (also known as House of the Damned and Escape to Nowhere) is a 1996 American horror film directed by Scott Levy and starring Greg Evigan and Alexandra Paul. The film follows an American family who move into an Irish mansion haunted by a multitude of ghosts.

The film screened on Showtime as part of the Roger Corman Presents series.

== Plot ==
Two maids are sent to clean Glen Abbey Manor, a remote estate in Ireland, and encounter several frightening occurrences. One of the maids is attacked by rats and attempts to flee in her car, which inexplicably explodes.

Some time later, married American couple Will and Maura South, along with their daughter, Aubrey, move into Glen Abbey after Maura inherits it from a relative. Their marriage has been in crisis after Will, a writer, was unfaithful to Maura. Almost immediately after moving in, the family are plagued by various odd occurrences, such as disembodied voices, and Will's computer crashing. On their first night, Aubrey is attacked by a monstrous apparition in her room, which vanishes. Terrified, Will and Maura consult Edward Shea, a self-proclaimed clairvoyant, to investigate the home.

During an investigation with his assistant, Amy, Edward has a vision of a woman being sexually assaulted by a disembodied hand. Amy searches public death records on her computer and finds records of the Laundrigans, a family who resided in the home in the late 19th-century. James Laundrigan, the father, died of pneumonia, while his wife Marion committed suicide in the house; no death certificate exists for their daughter, Colleen. Maura is disturbed by this news, as Aubrey has mentioned the name Colleen, which she has attributed to one of her toy dolls.

Edward and Amy investigate the house's cellar, where Will discovered an amulet showing runic symbols. Behind a brick wall, they uncover Colleen's remains, who was apparently murdered by her mother. After Colleen is given a proper burial, Will and Maura invite Edward, Amy, and Father Seamus, the local parish priest, over for dinner. In her bedroom, Aubrey witnesses the apparition of a nun; meanwhile, during the dinner downstairs, Will, Maura, and their guests are violently attacked by a poltergeist, which shatters the windows and throws knives and utensils at them. Edward flees outside, and Will and Maura subsequently find his decapitated body on the ground, his severed head lying on a ledge above the doorway, beneath a gargoyle brandishing a scythe. When Will and Maura attempt to recover Aubrey from her bedroom, they find a bright light emanating from the room, and Aubrey missing.

Father Seamus explains that he placed the amulet in the basement of the home, and their disturbing of it unleashed supernatural energy, which was conjured by James and Marion Laundrigan, whom he claims practised black magic there. After Father Seamus completes a ritual, they discover Aubrey trapped behind the wall where Colleen's remains were found, and break it down to save her. After Father Seamus and Amy leave, Maura confronts Will, accusing him of having affection for Amy, which he denies. That night, Maura has a dream of Will taunting her while having sex with Amy. The following morning, as the family prepares to leave to return to California, Maura has a vision of Will having sex with Amy on the family car. Convinced the encounter actually occurred, she locks him out of the house and seals herself inside with Aubrey.

Apparently possessed, Maura locks Aubrey in her bedroom. Will goes to consult Father Seamus at the church, but finds him dead, kneeling at the altar. Meanwhile, Aubrey witnesses an apparition of Colleen before Maura attacks her with a cleaver. Will returns to the house, armed with a dagger left by Father Seamus, and manages to break inside, where he is attacked by Maura, armed with the cleaver and knives. Will wrestles Maura to the ground before stabbing her in the chest with the dagger. After, a beam of light emanates from the wound, and Maura awakens, healed and restored to her former self. The house suddenly begins to crumble around the three and they flee outside, where they witness it burst into a blazing inferno.

== Cast ==
- Greg Evigan as Will South
- Alexandra Paul as Maura South
- Briana Evigan as Aubrey South
- Éamonn Draper as Father Seamus
- Dick Donaghue as Dr. Edward Shea
- Mary Kate Ryan as Amy Wolfe
- Columba Heneghan as Plumber
- Helena Walsh as Charwoman #1
- Triona Ui Chonsdale as Charwoman #2
- Marie Stafford as Marion
- Aoife O'Grady as Colleen
- Elizabeth Costello as woman in bed
- Celine Curtin as bus driver

== Reception ==
Caryn James of The New York Times said the film has "a few effectively scary moments, but it's more like a cut-rate version of The Exorcist than a real Roger Corman film. It's not for the fainthearted or the children." TV Guide awarded it two out of five stars, noting it as "an efficient shocker that should please fans of the genre, despite the fact that it offers nothing that hasn't been seen in dozens of similar films. The element of marital tension is just enough to unsettle the predictability of the family-in-peril mechanics (not to mention providing an excuse for some supernatural sexual shenanigans to spice up the proceedings)."
