= Full Body Massage =

1995 American television film by Nicolas Roeg

- 1996 VHS cover
- Genre: Drama
- Written by: Dan Gurskis
- Directed by: Nicolas Roeg
- Starring: Mimi Rogers; Bryan Brown
- Music by: Harry Gregson-Williams
- Country of origin: United States
- Original language: English

Production
- Executive producer: Robert Littman
- Producers: Julie Bilson Ahlberg; Michael Nolin
- Cinematography: Anthony B. Richmond
- Editor: Louise Rubacky
- Running time: 93 minutes
- Production company: Littman-Gurskis-Nolin Productions

Original release
- Network: Showtime
- Release: November 5, 1995

Full Body Massage is a 1995 American drama television film directed by Nicolas Roeg, written by Dan Gurskis, starring Mimi Rogers and Bryan Brown. In the film, an art dealer talks about relationships and philosophy with her masseur. It premiered on Showtime on November 5, 1995.

== Plot ==
Nina, an art dealer, has her weekly massage appointment and is surprised to find out her usual masseur, Douglas, has sent a replacement named Fitch. The pair develop an easy rapport during the session, with talk about past relationships. As Nina lies on the massage table, Fitch also takes time to explain various massage techniques, including those used by Hopi medicine men.

== Cast ==
- Mimi Rogers as Nina
- Bryan Brown as Fitch
- Christopher Burgard as Douglas
- Elizabeth Barondes as Alice
- Gareth Williams as Harry Willis
- Patrick Neil Quinn as Andy
- Heather Gunn as DeeDee
- Gabriella Hall as Young Nina (credited as Laura Saldivar)
- Brian McLane as young Fitch
- William Fuller as Fitch's Father
- Lynette Bennett as Fitch's Mother
- Rachel Nolin as Fitch's Sister
- Michael Edmonds as Hopi Medicine Man
- Ross McKerras as Rancher 1
- Michael Robert Nyman as Rancher 2

== Production ==
Mimi Rogers said Nicolas Roeg waited for her to have her baby, so they shot four-and-a-half months after she gave birth. "My body was not what it usually is", she said.

== Reception ==
The film has been ironically called an American version of the French film La Belle Noiseuse (1991), which starred Emmanuelle Béart as an artist's model who spends much of the 240-minute feature nude, discussing relationships with the artist.
