= Alien Avengers =

1996 television film

- Home video cover art
- Genre: Comedy; Sci-Fi
- Written by: Michael MacDonald; Michael McDonald (as Michael James McDonald)
- Directed by: Lev L. Spiro
- Starring: George Wendt
- Music by: Tyler Bates
- Country of origin: United States
- Original language: English

Production
- Executive producer: Roger Corman
- Producers: Michael Amato; Frances Doel; Darin Spillman
- Cinematography: Christopher Baffa
- Editor: Daniel H. Holland
- Running time: 81 min.
- Production companies: Concorde-New Horizons; Showtime Networks

Original release
- Release: August 3, 1996

Alien Avengers is a 1996 American television film directed by Lev L. Spiro and starring George Wendt. It was part of the Roger Corman Presents series. It was also known as Welcome to Planet Earth. The film led to a sequel, Alien Avengers II, the following year.

== Plot ==
Joseph Collins, an ex-con, (Christopher Brown) inherits an abandoned and dilapidated boarding house from his deceased mother, and before he even gets a chance to clean the place, Charlie (Wendt), Rhonda (Reed) and their teenage daughter, Daphne (Sakelaris), who are really aliens hiding their true identities, arrive for a vacation. Charlie forks over a bundle of cash, and the alien family settles in. The family's idea of a good time is going out on the town and killing criminals and thugs they encounter on the streets, and bringing the body parts back to the boarding house to snack on.

== Cast ==
- George Wendt
- Shanna Reed
- Anthony Anderson
- Anastasia Sakelaris
- Christopher M. Brown – Joseph Collins

== Reception ==
Tony Scott wrote in Variety Magazine that the film "depends too much on pre-adolescent gags, and the humor's obvious, the lingo crude, the situations mostly lame, the script bogs down among the excesses, and the windups a letdown."

== Alien Avengers II ==
Alien Avengers
- Genre: Comedy; Sci-Fi
- Written by: Michael McDonald (as Michael James McDonald)
- Directed by: David Payne
- Starring: George Wendt; Julie Brown
- Music by: Tyler Bates
- Country of origin: United States
- Original language: English

Production
- Executive producer: Roger Corman
- Producers: Darin Spillman; Marta M. Mobley
- Production locations: Melody Ranch – 24715 Oak Creek Avenue, Newhall, California; Santa Clarita, California
- Cinematography: Mike Mickens
- Editor: JJ Jackson
- Running time: 89 min.
- Production companies: Concorde Pictures; Showtime Networks; Transpacific Corp.

Original release
- Release: October 25, 1997

=== Plot ===
Aliens become sheriffs of a small town.
