= Virtual Seduction =

- VHS cover art
- Genre: Thriller
- Written by: Michelle Gamble-Risley; William Widmaier; Paul Ziller
- Directed by: Paul Ziller
- Starring: Jeff Fahey; Ami Dolenz
- Music by: David Wurst; Eric Wurst
- Country of origin: United States
- Original language: English

Production
- Executive producer: Roger Corman
- Producer: Mike Elliott
- Cinematography: Kurt Brabbee
- Editors: Roderick Davis; Gwyneth Gibby
- Running time: 85 minutes
- Production company: New Concorde

Original release
- Network: Showtime
- Release: August 1, 1995

Virtual Seduction is a 1995 American made-for-television thriller film directed by Paul Ziller and starring Jeff Fahey and Ami Dolenz. It was part of the Roger Corman Presents series and originally aired on Showtime on August 1, 1995.

The film was shot in Vancouver.

== Cast ==
- Jeff Fahey as Liam Bass
- Ami Dolenz as Laura
- Carrie Genzel as Paris
- Meshach Taylor as Anderson
- Frank Novak as Dr. Grant
- Kevin Alber as Reynolds
