= Shadow of a Scream =

- Directed by: Howard McCain
- Written by: Christopher Wood
- Produced by: Mary Ann Fisher 'executive Lance H Robbins; Roger Corman co-producer Cheryl Parnell; Edward G Reilly
- Starring: Timothy Busfield; Athena Massey; David Chokachi
- Cinematography: Edward Talavera
- Release date: 10 August 1996
- Countries: United States; Ireland
- Language: English

Shadow of a Scream, also known as The Unspeakable and Criminal Pursuit, is a 1996 American-Irish film directed by Howard McCain and starring Timothy Busfield, Athena Massey and David Chokachi. It was part of the Roger Corman Presents series on Showtime.

== Cast ==
- David Chokachi
- Cyril O'Reilly
- Athena Massey
- Timothy Busfield

== Production ==
The film was known as Search then The Unspeakable. It was shot in Ireland.
