= Roger Corman Presents =

Film series made for Showtime

Roger Corman Presents is a series of films made for Showtime by film producer Roger Corman.

== Production ==
Showtime approached Corman with the idea of doing a series of science fiction and horror feature films. They started filming in January 1995 and finished shooting 13 films in mid June with a budget of approximately $1.5 million each.

Corman said, "I don't think a day went by that we weren't shooting. We were shooting on weekends, we were shooting at our studio here. We were shooting at local locations, and we shot one film in Moscow and one film in Manila. So we were all over the world with this thing."

Corman ended up re-making two more films in the first season. According to Corman, "They were actually chosen by Showtime who did a lot of market research. I had said I didn't want to remake the Edgar Allan Poe pictures, because I didn't want to do those without Vincent, and also the period style of the pictures means that they're as new now as they were when they were made. Because the 19th century is the 19th century. Whereas the other pictures... being contemporary films could easily be remade, brought up to date, re-written for the '90s."

The other nine were originals. Corman said, "One of them, we purchased a screenplay because we couldn't develop enough. We had three of the thirteen shot before this year, and I shot the other ten in five and a half months. We couldn't develop all the scripts so a picture called Terminal Virus was the script that we bought and it will be the last one to go on, and all the rest were scripts that we developed ourselves."

Movies were still sporadically released under the Roger Corman Presents banner through 1999.

=== Rejected film ===
The 1997 film The Haunted Sea was originally intended as an episode of this anthology. However, it had a troubled production and was rejected by broadcaster Showtime, which determined that it did not meet its quality standards. It premiered on home video instead.

== Filmography ==
=== Season 1 ===
- Ep. 1 - Suspect Device – aired 11 July 1995
- Ep. 2 - The Alien Within a.k.a. Unknown Origin – 18 July 1995
- Ep. 3 - Sawbones – 25 July 1995
- Ep. 4 - Virtual Seduction – 1 August 1995
- Ep. 5 - Bram Stoker's Burial of the Rats – 8 August 1995
- Ep. 6 - Not Like Us – 15 August 1995: Noting that this is a comedy-horror movie with its tongue firmly in its cheek, TV Guide thought the movie failed to be funny; Creature Feature gave the movie 3.5 out of 5 stars. Cast included Joanna Pacula as Anita Clark and Peter Onorati as Sam Clark. Plot: Soon after the Joneses move in, residents of the town of Tranquility begin dropping dead. Unbeknownst to the neighbors, they are two alien scientists who came to Earth to use experimental plastic surgery techniques on humans.
- Ep. 7 - Black Scorpion – 22 August 1995 (USA)
- Ep. 8 - The Wasp Woman – 29 August 1995
- Ep. 9 - Not of This Earth – 5 September 1995
- Ep. 10 - A Bucket of Blood a.k.a. Dark Secrets and The Death Artist – 12 September 1995
- Ep. 11 - Hellfire a.k.a. Blood Song – 26 September 1995
- Ep. 12 - Piranha – 1 October 1995
- Ep. 13 - Terminal Virus – 3 October 1995
- Ep. 14 - Where Evil Lies

=== Season 2 ===
- Ep. 15 - Spectre a.k.a. House of the Damned – 13 July 1996
- Ep. 16 - Inhumanoid a.k.a. Circuit Breaker – 20 July 1996
- Ep. 17 - Alien Avengers a.k.a. Welcome to Planet Earth – 3 August 1996
- Ep. 18 - Shadow of a Scream – 10 August 1996
- Ep. 19 - Subliminal Seduction – 10 August 1996
- Ep. 20 - Last Exit to Earth – 17 August 1996
- Ep. 21 - Humanoids from the Deep – 14 September 1996
- Ep. 22 - Death Game – 21 September 1996
- Ep. 23 - Vampirella – 28 September 1996
- Ep. 24 - Scene of the Crime a.k.a. Ladykiller – 5 October 1996
- Ep. 25 - When the Bullet Hits the Bone – 12 October 1996
- Ep. 26 - Marquis de Sade a.k.a. Dark Prince: Intimate Tales of Marquis de Sade – 19 October 1996
- Ep. 27 - Black Scorpion II – 13 May 1997
- Ep. 28 - Alien Avengers II – 25 October 1997
- Ep. 29 - Spacejacked – 8 November 1997
- Ep. 30 - The Haunted Sea – 17 November 1997
