= Kama Sutra (TV series) =

American TV series shown in 2000

- Starring: Tamara Landry - Dalia
- Country of origin: United States
- No. of episodes: 15

Original release
- Network: Showtime
- Release: June 24 – October 7, 2000

Kama Sutra is an erotic television show on Showtime.

== Episode list ==
1. "Love Quarrels" – June 24, 2000
2. "Nirvana" – July 1, 2000
3. "The Art of Personal Adornment" – July 8, 2000
4. "Menage a Trois" – July 22, 2000
5. "Conduct of a Wife" – July 29, 2000
6. "Carnal Heat" – August 5, 2000
7. "The Art of Biting" – August 12, 2000
8. "Women of the Royal Harem" – August 19, 2000
9. "For the Wives of Others" – August 26, 2000
10. "The Acquisition of the Girl" – September 2, 2000
11. "Transition to Lovemaking" – September 9, 2000
12. "Special Tastes" – September 16, 2000
13. "On the Means of Exciting Desire" – September 23, 2000
14. "The Kiss That Awakens" – September 30, 2000
15. "Master and Servant" – October 7, 2000
