= Subliminal Seduction =

1996 film by Andrew Stevens

- Australian home video cover art
- Written by: Karen Kelly
- Directed by: Andrew Stevens
- Starring: Ian Ziering; Katherine Kelly Lang; Dee Wallace; Andrew Stevens
- Music by: Terry Plumeri
- Country of origin: United States
- Original language: English

Production
- Producer: Andrew Stevens
- Cinematography: Gary Graver
- Editor: Peter Basinski
- Running time: 81 minutes
- Production companies: Concorde-New Horizons; Royal Oaks Entertainment Inc. Showtime Networks

Original release
- Network: Showtime
- Release: August 3, 1996

Subliminal Seduction (released as Mind Storm in Australia) is a 1996 American drama science fiction film produced and directed by Andrew Stevens and starring Ian Ziering, Katherine Kelly Lang, Dee Wallace and Andrew Stevens. It was part of the Roger Corman Presents series premiering on August 3, 1996 at 10:15 PM, airing on Showtime as a television film.

== Plot ==
One of the top computer game designers in the country, Darrin Danver decides to move, with his lovely wife, Bev to Las Vegas and work for Compucom, the leading developer and distributor of computer games worldwide. More than eager to woo their newest arrival, Compucom showers the Danvers, with many luxuries and spoils. Both Darrin and Deb have worked long and hard, and a taste of the "good" life is something they both would not mind savoring for a while.

Operated like an old "ivy league" fraternity, the corporation encourages its male executives to marry decent home-makers. Uneasy with the corporation's expectations, Deb decides to finish up her Ph.D.. Becoming increasingly suspicious of the company's constraints, Deb's curiosity grows in this CD-ROM company her husband has formed a strong loyalty to. Therefore, a mounting tension between the couple surmounts.

Well Darrin and Deb continue, with their daily routines, two top executives with Compucom, Meg and Jimmy Eicher, dangerously test the effects of cerebral brain lobe stimulus on unsuspecting volunteers. These "guinea pigs" are made to perform certain tasks and then have no recollection of any occurrence the next morning.

During a company dinner, one of the executives' wives babbles hysterically about this game they are all in, a moment later her husband Larry decides to finish it by leaping off the roof of the building. Of course, Larry's secretary Angie turns to Darrin to console her grief, and to carry out her plans of seduction.

Darrin begins poking around at Compucom and discovers the company's prize CD-ROM game "Mouse Maze" is encoded with subliminal information formulated to each executive and contains directives aimed at the consumer. Directives that are considered highly illegal and virtually undetectable. Stumbling across a set of CD's hidden in their house, by the previous deceased, Compucom executive, Debb and Darrin take them to a computer wizard friend of theirs. With Angie's help, they re-encode the game "Mouse Maze", before it goes into mass production.

"Pan or Pleasure" becomes the name of the game when Darrin further discovers a flash frame of light that, acts as an undetectable visual catalyst to Compucom volunteers. The game has made sight, sound and touch seem so real that, it can actually induce bodily sensations, such as sex, orgasm, pain and even death.

The tension and excitement escalates, when Darrin discovers that, his friend, Doug was reduced to a lifeless heap after experiencing the game at full warp and Bev has been given "directives" to jump off the Hoover Dam. Every second counting, Darrin barely pulls his wife, Deb to safety from the treacherous fall as Angie holds the culprits at gunpoint for the authorities to deal, with.

== Cast ==
- Ian Ziering as Darrin Danver
- Katherine Kelly Lang as Deb Danver
- Andrew Stevens as Tom Moore
- Dee Wallace Stone as Sissy Bonner
- Stella Stevens as Mrs. Beecham
- Larry Manetti as Larry Bonner
- Kim Morgan Greene as Meg
- Kin Shriner as Jimmy
- Marc Riffon as Doug
- Rainer Grant as Angie
- Griffin Drew as Kim

== Release ==
=== Video distribution ===
The television film was subsequently distributed and marketed under multiple titles (Flash Frame, The Corporation and Mind Storm) as VHS, DVD and streaming video movies.
