= Dan Golden (filmmaker) =

American filmmaker

- Occupations: Producer and composer
- Years active: 2000-present

Dan Golden is a composer and film maker. Golden and fellow producer Daniel Sousa were nominated for an Academy Award for Best Animated Short Film for the film Feral at the 2014 Academy Awards. Golden is a 1994 alumnus of the Rhode Island School of Design.
