= Streetwalkin' =

- Theatrical poster
- Directed by: Joan Freeman
- Written by: Robert Alden; Joan Freeman
- Produced by: Robert Alden executive Roger Corman
- Starring: Melissa Leo; Dale Midkiff; Julie Newmar
- Cinematography: Steven Fierberg
- Edited by: John K. Adams; Patrick Rand
- Music by: Matthew Ender; Doug Timm
- Production company: Rodeo
- Distributed by: Concorde Pictures
- Release date: 20 September 1985
- Country: United States
- Language: English

Streetwalkin' is a 1985 American thriller film starring Melissa Leo in her film debut. It was an early film from Concorde Pictures.

A remake was made in 1991 called Uncaged starring Jeffrey Dean Morgan. This movie is a virtual scene for scene remake of "Streetwalkin' and it also includes some of the cast from the original one.

== Plot ==
Cookie and her brother run away from their loveless mother and their abusive stepfather in Upstate New York and arrive in New York City. At the train station, Cookie meets a pimp named Duke. With his charm, he makes her fall in love with him and soon has her working as a prostitute. However, his brutality against her colleagues disgusts her.

== Cast ==
- Melissa Leo as Cookie
- Dale Midkiff as Duke
- Leon Robinson as Jason
- Antonio Fargas as Finesse
- Julie Newmar as Queen Bee
- Randall Batinkoff as Tim
- Annie Golden as Phoebe
- Deborah Offner as Heather
- Khandi Alexander as Star
- Greg Germann as Creepy
- Kirk Taylor as Spade"
- Samantha Fox as Topless Dancer
- Conrad Roberts as Seller
- Tom Wright as Henchman #1
- Daniel Jordano as Henchman #2
- Gary Howard Klar as Bouncer
- Kim Chan as Desk Clerk

== Production ==
Freeman was a documentary filmmaker who wanted to move into dramatic features. She approached Roger Corman seeking finance for a film she wanted to make about vice. Corman was reluctant so she and her husband wrote a short film for Freeman to direct: Brainwash, about a girl kidnapped by a cult. Corman was impressed and agreed to make Streetwalkin.

Corman agreed to let Freeman shoot the film on location in New York - this was the first time he had done so. He called the movie "an honest look at prostitution. It's wrong, it's not glamorous. It's a dirty, dangerous business."

The film was shot over 24 nights in June 1984.

== Reception ==
It was one of the first eight films distributed by Corman's new company, Concorde Pictures, along with The Devastator, Naked Vengeance, Wheels of Fire, Loose Screws (Screwballs II), School Spirit, Barbarian Queen, and Wizards of the Lost Kingdom. It was the first film released by Concorde in collaboration with Cinema Group.

=== Critical ===
The film screened out of competition at the Berlin Film Festival.

The Los Angeles Times said, "a feature debut could scarcely be more cynical."
