= Wizards of the Lost Kingdom =

1985 Argentinian-American film

- Theatrical release poster
- Directed by: Héctor Olivera
- Written by: Ed Naha (as Tom Edwards)
- Produced by: Frank Isaac; Alex Sessa
- Starring: Bo Svenson; Vidal Peterson; Thom Christopher; Barbara Stock; María Socas
- Cinematography: Leonardo Rodríguez Solís
- Edited by: Silvia Ripoll
- Music by: Christopher Young; James Horner (from Battle Beyond the Stars)
- Production company: Trinity Productions
- Distributed by: Concorde Pictures
- Release date: April 1985
- Countries: United States; Argentina
- Language: English

Wizards of the Lost Kingdom is a 1985 Argentinian-American sword and sorcery film written by Ed Naha and directed by Héctor Olivera. It stars Bo Svenson as Kor the Conqueror, Vidal Peterson as Simon, and Thom Christopher as Shurka. The film is one of ten that Roger Corman produced in Argentina during the 1980s, beginning with Deathstalker in 1983.

The sequel Wizards of the Lost Kingdom II followed in 1989.

It was one of the first eight films distributed by Corman's new company, Concorde Pictures, along with The Devastator, Naked Vengeance, Wheels of Fire, Loose Screws (Screwballs II), School Spirit, Barbarian Queen, and Streetwalkin’.

== Plot ==
In the peaceful kingdom of Axeholme lives the teenage boy Simon, son of Wulfrik, the king's court wizard. The evil sorcerer Shurka starts a coup d'état, aided by the King's wife, killing the king, and imprisoning the princess, Aura. Before he is slain by Shurka, Wulfrik teleports Simon and his friend Gulfax to safety and gifts him his powerful magic ring. However, unbeknownst to all, Simon loses the ring during his escape.

Simon teams up with the warrior Kor to free the kingdom and rescue the princess. After narrowly escaping one of Shurka’s insectoid creatures, they make camp for the night. Seeking help to defeat the evil wizard, Simon summons long-dead legendary warriors from their resting place, using his powers to resurrect them, but only provokes the reanimated corpses into attacking him before they return to their graves. Kor and Simon stumble upon the cottage of the hobgoblin Hurla, which is attacked by lizard men. Simon uses magic to defeat them. The hobgoblin afterward joins forces with Simon on his quest.

On the way to the castle, Kor is then captured by cyclopses to be wed against his will or eaten, though he is rescued by Simon. The next day, while at a waterfall, they notice a woman drowning. After attempting a rescue, Kor discovers she is a Naiad and the river guardian. They have passed her test of heroism, allowing them to go further and reach the castle. Meanwhile, Shurka has imprisoned the queen, usurped the kingdom, and hypnotized the princess into becoming his bride.

Returning to the castle after exile, they release a group of townsfolk from prison, leading to a huge battle outside. Simon, having retrieved the ring, and Shurka face each other on the towers using white and black magic, where the latter is slain. Simon and Aura are crowned the new King and Queen of Axeholme. Kor departs, looking for more adventure.

== Cast ==
- Bo Svenson as Kor
- Vidal Peterson as Simon
- Thom Christopher as Shurka
- Barbara Stock as Queen Udea
- María Socas as Acrasia, the insectoid
- Dolores Michaels as Aura
- Edgardo Moreira as Wulfrik, Old Simon, and Gulfax
- Augusto Larreta as King Tylor
- Michael Fontaine as Hurla
- Marcos Woinsky as Rongar
- Marina Mangalli as Linnea, the Naiad
- Norton Freeman as Sipra
- Arch Gallo as Bobino
- Mark Peters as Timmon
- Rick Gallo as Malkon

== Production ==
The film re-used a large amount of stock footage from Sorceress (1982) and Deathstalker (1983). Ed Naha, who wrote the script, later recalled:

I don't think this movie was so much shot as it was beaten to death. When they whittled it down to what was useful from the footage, it only ran 58 minutes. Now Roger had done a lot of sword-and-sorcery films, and so he told a couple of the editors to pull all they could from them and edit that footage in. So now the finished movie has a 15 or 20-minute prologue that has nothing to do with rest of the film!

== Legacy ==
=== Sequel ===
In 1989, Wizards of the Lost Kingdom was followed by a sequel (featuring none of the cast or crew of the original film), Wizards of the Lost Kingdom II. Ed Naha stated:

Three years later I'm at a wedding reception for a friend who still works for Roger. And Roger's there. So we're chatting and kidding around, and I said, 'Ah, man, remember that "Wizards of the Lost Kingdom" movie?' And he said, 'Oh, y'know, that did very well in video. We filmed a sequel!'

=== Mystery Science Theater 3000 ===
In April 2017 Wizards of the Lost Kingdom and its sequel were both featured on the eleventh season of Mystery Science Theater 3000.
