= The Devastator (film) =

- Directed by: Cirio H. Santiago
- Written by: Joseph Zucchero
- Distributed by: Concorde Pictures
- Release date: 1986
- Running time: 78 minutes
- Countries: United States; Philippines
- Language: English

The Devastator is a 1986 American-Philippine film starring Rick Hill and Katt Shea directed by Cirio H. Santiago. The film was also known as The Destroyers and Kings Ransom.

== Premise ==
A Vietnam veteran investigates the death of his former commanding officer in a small Californian town. He soon discovers his old friend was involved in a local crime syndicate who dominate the down. The gangsters attack the veteran, who then returns with some of his former comrades to take revenge.

== Cast ==
- Rick Hill as Deacon Porter
- Katt Shea as Audrey
- Crofton Hardester as Carey
- Terrence O'Hara as Spencer
- Bill McLaughlin as Bartlett
- Kaz Garas as Sheriff
- Jack S. Daniels as Ox
- Steve Rogers as Reese
- Debbie Brooks as Elaine

== Production ==
Rick Hill had previously appeared in Deathstalker. The film was shot on location in Los Angeles.

== Release ==
It was one of the first eight films distributed by Roger Corman's new company, Concorde Pictures, along with Wizards of the Lost Kingdom, Naked Vengeance, Wheels of Fire, Loose Screws (Screwballs II), School Spirit, Barbarian Queen, and Streetwalkin’.

== Reception ==
The film has been described as follows: "The Lousy acting and writing ravage this movie about an evil marijuana plantation owner." A review on the German website Action Freunde stated that the film "remains solid standard action with a run-of-the-mill plot and stereotypical standard characters, which, after a somewhat bumpy start, escalates with the hero's attempted solo revenge campaign when he and his Vietnam buddy give the villains a hard time. The action is in the middle range in terms of staging, but there is plenty of it and after less than 80 minutes the horror is over..." A similar appraisal can be found on the specialised website The Action Elite: "The Devastator is a fun low budget 80’s actioner but there are better movies with similar stories and bigger budgets."
