= The Expendables (1988 film) =

Vietnam film directed by Cirio H. Santiago

- Directed by: Cirio H. Santiago
- Written by: Philip Alderton
- Produced by: Anna Hays; Christopher R. Santiago
- Starring: Anthony Finetti; Peter Nelson
- Cinematography: Ricardo Remias
- Edited by: Edgardo Vinarao
- Music by: Jaime Fabregas
- Production company: Premiere Productions
- Distributed by: Premiere Productions (Philippines); Concorde Pictures (US)
- Release dates: July 1988 (US); March 30, 1989 (Philippines)
- Countries: United States; Philippines
- Language: English

The Expendables (released in the Philippines as Full Battle Gear) is a 1988 Filipino-American action film directed by Cirio H. Santiago and written by Philip Alderton. It stars Anthony Finetti, Peter Nelson, Loren Haynes and Kevin Duffis.

== Plot ==
The film is a Vietnam exploitation film where a commando makes an elite team out of rebels. The men are trouble makers and rebels, but are able to perform well. The men are sent out to blow up a bridge and manage to destroy the North Vietnamese Army (NVA) guards. However, another NVA force arrives and an all out battle commences. During the battle, two of the men are killed, but the team kills off all of the NVA reinforcements and captures their leader.

The team is next sent on another mission to capture two village women, and then another to destroy an enemy base where another member is killed. They kill all of the NVA forces in the base, but their mission gets tougher when a prisoner escapes and captures American women and holds them hostage. The NVA splits up into two forces: one at an old fort and the other to ambush the team as it arrives.

Despite the NVA plan of ambush, the NVA are wiped out, but they manage to kill two of the women and one of the special squad. Realizing that there is little time, the squad goes on with their mission and finds the fort. Their squad leader goes inside the fort to recon and is captured. The squad decides to go in and rescue him, the POW girls, and kill the NVA leader.

== Cast ==
- Anthony Finetti as Captain Rosello
- Peter Nelson as Sterling
- Loren Haynes as Lord
- Kevin Duffis as Jackson
- William Steis as Colonel
- Vic Diaz as Tranh Um Phu
- Lea Navarro as Phu Ling
- David Light as Cabrini
- Jeff Griffith as Richter
- Eric Hahn as Navarro
- Don "The Dragon" Wilson as Wilson
- Jim Moss as Moss
- Don Holtz as Holtz
- Greg Rocero as Lopez
- Corwin Sperry as Strzalkowski
- Janet Price as Nurse
- Vicky Suba as Prostitute (uncredited)

== Release ==
The Expendables was released as Full Battle Gear by Jadestar Films in the Philippines on March 30, 1989.

== Reception ==
From contemporary reviews, "Lor." of Variety referred to the film as "well-made but ho-hum Vietnam War saga" and that the film "is enjoyable on a mindless action level, but bogs down in some rather pretentious verbal exchanges as Philip Alderton's script tries lamely for significance." as well as noting that the "Glum ending is overly downbeat".
