= Dance with Death (film) =

1992 film

- Directed by: Charles Philip Moore
- Written by: Daryl Haney
- Story by: Katt Shea; Andy Ruben
- Produced by: Mike Elliott executive Roger Corman
- Starring: Maxwell Caulfield; Barbara Alyn Woods; Martin Mull
- Cinematography: William H. Molina
- Production company: Concorde Pictures
- Release date: 1992
- Country: United States
- Language: English

Dance with Death is an American film starring Barbara Alyn Woods and Maxwell Caulfield. It is a reworking of Stripped to Kill, a previous film from 1987 produced by Roger Corman's Concorde Pictures studio. It is notable for featuring an early acting role for Lisa Kudrow.

== Plot ==
Kelly Crosby is a reporter for a Los Angeles newspaper who finds out that strippers at a club called Bottoms Up are getting brutally murdered. She convinces Hopper, her editor and ex-boyfriend, to let her go undercover by winning an amateur night contest to get a job at the club. Once embedded, Kelly gets to know the other employees, particularly the snide owner Art, the hapless DJ Dermot, and mercurial dancer Jodie. She also discovers a regular patron, Shaughnessy, is an undercover detective investigating the murders. He soon discovers her true identity as a reporter, and they team up to investigate. As she continues working at the club, she is made aware of several suspects in the murders: Henry, a shy regular who is fixated on lingerie, Art, who has a connection to one of the dead women, and even Hopper, whom she learns covered a string of similar stripper murders in Atlanta and was interrogated by police. As they share their information, Kelly and Shaughnessy become infatuated with each other.

After one night spent together, Kelly looks in on Jodie, who had not reported to work the previous evening, and discovers her murdered. Shaughnessy follows Henry to a park he regularly visits, and after confronting him, causes him to be shot dead by backup police. That night at the club, after a performance, Kelly hears noises from Art's office, and discovers him dead; Hopper seizes her, insisting he killed Art by accident, in a dispute over blackmail involving him and another of the club dancers. She escapes him, and Shaughnessy intercepts her and shoots Hopper dead. She is relieved at first, but as he holds her, she notices the stone from his ring is missing, and remembers that she found a stone in Jodie's hand; she realizes Shaughnessy is the murderer. She tries to escape him, but is followed by him into a next door warehouse. After repeated attempts to kill him which he recovers from, she finally sets a trap with gasoline and sets him on fire.

Sometime later at the newspaper office, Kelly begins typing her story on the murders, called "Dance with Death."

== Cast ==
- Maxwell Caulfield as Shaughnessy
- Barbara Alyn Woods as Kelly
- Martin Mull as Art
- Catya Sassoon as Jodie
- Tracey Burch as Whitney
- Jill Pierce as Lola
- Alretha Baker as Sunny
- Michael McDonald as Henry
- Drew Snyder as Hopper
- Lisa Kudrow as Millie
- Maria Ford as Stripper (uncredited)

== Production ==
Katt Shea wrote the original story for the 1987 with her husband. She later recalled:

I just didn't get paid for it. It was weird. Basically my script from Stripped to Kill was re-worked and re-used by Roger Corman and a very bad movie was the result of that. That’s my opinion and I just don’t think that film was well done. I don’t like that Roger Corman does that. I love Roger, but I just didn’t like that.

Maxwell Caulfield recalled, "I met Corman very briefly, he didn't give me the time of day, even though I was stripping down to the short and curlies for him. That was a real sleeze bucket of a movie. I've done one even lower than that, but hopefully you won't have turned it up in your research. You know, Corman has some funny ideas about what you can skimp on to save money on a picture, things like a roof on the soundstage (laughs)."
