= Bloodfist III: Forced to Fight =

- DVD cover
- Directed by: Oley Sassone
- Written by: Allison Burnett
- Produced by: New Concorde (Roger Corman)
- Starring: Don "The Dragon" Wilson; Richard Roundtree; Laura Stockman; Richard Paul; Rick Dean; Stan Longinidis; Pete "Sugarfoot" Cunningham
- Cinematography: Rick Bota
- Edited by: Eric L. Beason
- Music by: Nigel Holton
- Production company: Hollywood Road Films
- Distributed by: Concorde Films
- Release date: January 3, 1992
- Running time: 88 minutes
- Country: United States
- Language: English

Bloodfist III: Forced to Fight (also known as Forced to Fight and Forced to Fight: Bloodfist III) is a 1992 American martial arts crime action film directed by Oley Sassone and starring Don "The Dragon" Wilson, Richard Roundtree, and Gregory McKinney. It was written by Allison Burnett. It was the final film in the series to be released theatrically, as the other five sequels went straight-to-video. A sequel to Bloodfist II (1990), it is the third installment in the Bloodfist film series.

== Plot ==
Jimmy Boland (Don Wilson) has been sentenced to a California maximum-security prison for a murder that he didn't commit. When he sees some black prison inmates sodomizing his friend, he flies into a rage and kills the gang leader. The prison warden, in an effort to do Jimmy in, transfers him to the black wing of the prison, where he is sure the black prisoners will dispatch him quickly. This looks to be a safe bet, since the gang member Jimmy had killed was a drug supplier to Blue, the leader of the black prison gang. Wheelhead, a white inmate and leader of a group of white supremacists, takes Jimmy under his wing and offers Jimmy support if he joins the gang. Jimmy refuses, preferring to stay neutral. Meanwhile, Jimmy warms up to his cellmate Stark (Richard Roundtree), and Stark invites Jimmy to join a multi-racial group of prisoners who tend the rooftop prison garden. Jimmy has managed to maintain his neutrality, but at a price. Now both Blue and Wheelhead want to see him dead.

== Cast ==
- Don "The Dragon" Wilson as Jimmy Boland
- Richard Roundtree as Samuel Stark
- Stan Longinidis as Leadbottom
- Gregory McKinney as "Blue"
- Rick Dean as "Wheelhead"
- Richard Paul as Goddard
- Charles Boswell as Taylor
- John Cardone as Diddler
- Brad Blaisdell as Pisani
- Tony DiBenedetto as Tony "Tony D"
- Andre Rosey Brown as Clint
- J.W. Smith as "Sporty" Black
- Laura Stockman as Connie
- Kevin N. Davis as Stewart
- Pete "Sugarfoot" Cunningham as "Champ"
- Bob Schott as Willy "Weird Willy"
- Joe Garcia as "Chicago"
- Angelo Callahan as "French Fry"
- Jon Freedman as Guard
- Max Hunter as Inmate Palmer
- J.C. Motes as Prison Guard

== Release ==
Bloodfist III received a limited release theatrically from Concorde Films in January 1992. It ended up grossing $35,154 at the box office.

New Concorde Home Entertainment released the film on DVD in 2000 along with Bloodfist, Bloodfist II, and Bloodfist IV: Die Trying. The DVD is currently out-of-print.
