= Hugh G. Rection =

Hugh G. Rection may refer to:

- a fictional character in Screwballs II
- a fictional reference in "Sign here", an episode of Beavis and Butt-Head
- a ring name of wrestler Bill DeMott

== See also ==
- Gag name
