= New Concorde =

American film distribution company

- Formerly: Concorde-New Horizons (1983–2000)
- Industry: Subsidiary
- Founded: 1983; 43 years ago
- Founder: Roger Corman
- Headquarters: Los Angeles, California, U.S.
- Products: Motion pictures; Television broadcasting
- Parent: Shout! Studios (2018–present)

New Concorde (NC) is an American film distribution company founded by Roger Corman. NC got its start in 1983 when Corman formed the production and distribution Concorde-New Horizons (CNH) as one of the first production companies to develop and take advantage of video as a distribution tool.

The company was originally Concorde-New Horizons, which was itself created when Corman combined his two new companies Concorde Pictures (CP) and New Horizons Pictures in 1983. The company is now officially known as New Horizons Picture Corp.

== History ==
=== New World Pictures ===
Corman founded New World Productions (NWP) in 1970, and had been making low budget genre films until 1982. When larger studios began producing the same genres with larger budgets that his company could not meet, and after being approached by a consortium of attorneys wishing to buy the company, he opted in 1982 to sell his interests.

=== Millennium Films ===
Corman sold New World Pictures in January 1983 for $16.9 million. He retained all rights to his large back catalogue of films and took most members of his creative team with him. As he wrote "they had bought the dinosaur of distribution, leaving me with the film library and production staff."

Under the terms of the contract, he agreed to stay on as consultant for two years and that New World would guarantee to distribute any movies he made until February 1984, at a bargain rate fee of 15%. Corman agreed to provide the company with a minimum of five films they could release. He also undertook not to return to the distribution business.

Corman set up a new production company, Millennium - the title of which was taken from the name of a 1981 retrospective of Corman's work at the National Film Theatre of London. As the new owners of New World had taken over the old offices, Corman established offices for Millennium across the road from them in Brentwood. He announced plans to make films budgeted between $2–5 million a picture, using cash from his sale of New World.

Corman claimed he wanted to make less commercial films, and the first film from Millennium (and the last from old New World) was a character drama Love Letters. Another early, more arthouse effort from Millennium was Wild Side which became Suburbia. Millennium's other films were more standard exploitation fare such as Space Raiders and Screwballs.

Corman found he disliked working in Brentwood so eventually shifted the offices to Corman's Venice studio. He was having trouble with the name "Millennium" - "‘Nobody could spell it, nobody knew what it meant" so in October of 1983, Millennium was renamed "New Horizons."

=== Formation of Concorde Pictures ===
Some Corman films were released through the "new" New World, such as Love Letters, Deathstalker, Screwballs, and Space Raiders but Corman was unhappy with the results. "They never gave my pictures a full release, and they never paid me the money the pictures earned," he claimed.

In turn, the new owners of New World were unhappy with the advantageous deal given to Corman, and wanted to take the company public. Corman felt he had to go back into distribution, which was contrary to his agreement with New World. He later wrote, "The last thing I wanted to do was get back into distribution, but I had no choice. My pictures needed distribution and I needed the revenues."

In early 1985, Corman sued New World for breach of its obligations to him. In particular, he claimed that New World refused to distribute two of his films, School Spirit and Wheels of Fire, and that New World owed him money from Screwballs, Space Raiders and Slumber Party Massacre. In turn New World sued him claiming Corman had been discrediting the company against new investors and clients, and had bypassed New World in seeking distribution for some of Corman's films, notably Hardbodies which had been partly financed by Corman but which had been sold to Columbia Pictures.

The matter went to court but only a few days into the trial both parties agreed to settle. Corman called this "an unhappy experience. I was forced back into distribution, a business I did not want to be in. I was so dead-set against it that I proposed a formula to a group of four well-financed independent producers to jointly start a distribution company."

The company would be called Concorde Pictures. Corman said "I had read a book this time that said hard C's were the most significant sound to sell products — like Kodak, or Coca-Cola. Concorde not only had two hard C's; for extra measure the dictionary described it as a harmonious grouping of similar entities with similar goals".

The company would be a "co-operative" that would distribute films from Corman (including his back catalogue of over 100 films) and other producers. The formation of this company was announced in March 1985. Corman announced Concorde's first few films would include School Spirit, Wheels of Fire and Barbarian Queen; he also declared an intention to distribute foreign films, as he had done with New World.

The first eight films distributed by Concorde would be Wizards of the Lost Kingdom, Naked Vengeance, Wheels of Fire, Loose Screws (Screwballs II), School Spirit, Barbarian Queen, The Devastator and Streetwalkin’.

In July 1985, it was announced Concorde would team with Cinema Group to distribute films. Their first releases would include Club Sandwich and Cocaine Wars from Concorde and Born American and Hollywood Vice Squad from Cinema Group. Other early releases included Loose Screws and Streetwalkin. Harper Paul Williams then ran Concorde. Corman called it "the first co-op distribution company."

He added, "I'm not that happy about being a businessman in distribution again but it's something I have to deal with for at least another year. Then I hope to return to directing. Our goal is to make eight to nine pictures a year and eventually start picking up foreign films and independent features."

However Corman had trouble finding other companies to distribute with parties. He said others who proposed to join the distribution company pulled out as they lacked the requisite money. The arrangement with Cinema Group ended and Concorde wound up being a distributor on its own.

=== Concorde ===
CNH came into existence during the beginnings of the home video boom. Corman found he was in an ideal position to capitalize on the new market. Using his extensive back catalogue and his creative team he was able to take full advantage of the new and growing video market and created films specifically targeted toward home video. This made Concorde-New Horizons one of the first production companies to fully develop and capitalize on video as a distribution tool.

This allowed Corman's Concorde-New Horizons to be more prolific than his former New World Productions, but that productivity resulted in a lowering of standards. The new New World films were themselves seen as producers of low quality products, but their films were seen as having an energy and charm that Corman's films seemed to lack. However, his goal to create films for a direct-to-video market has been financially successful. According to his biographer, "At Concorde-New Horizons in the mid-1980s, the key to profitability seemed to lie in volume: more movies meant more money. Corman, of course, was heartened when this theorem proved to be true. What he didn’t foresee, however, is that he was creating his very own Frankenstein monster—a company that grew so large so fast that it threatened to overwhelm him."

Last Resort (1986) was an attempt at a broad appeal comedy. Corman had more success with Stripped to Kill.

Beverly Gray, Corman's biographer, wrote "many Concorde veterans remember the late 1980s as the company’s golden age, in which there was plenty of room for new ideas and new talent. This was a time when exciting young directors put their personal stamp on conventional genre-film assignment."

Filminl argued the overall quality of Corman's output dropped around this time and "Most discussions of Corman’s output skim over the post New World Pictures, and I can’t really say they’re wrong to do so."

== New Concorde ==
In early 2000, Corman renamed the firm 'New Concorde', sold the New Horizons Pictures (NHP) branch, and reorganized to form New Concorde Home Entertainment.

In 2005, Concorde signed a 12-year deal with Buena Vista Home Entertainment giving BVHE distribution rights to the more than 400 Roger Corman produced films. Buena Vista ended the deal with New Horizons early in 2008, largely due to poor sales and poor masters for many of the titles.

In 2010, Shout! Factory signed a large package deal with New Horizons Pictures for nearly all the Concorde-New Horizon and pre-1984 New World Pictures catalog, including those that were previously put out by Buena Vista Home Entertainment. In March 2018, Shout! Factory acquired New Horizons from Roger Corman, giving them complete ownership of all the Concorde-New Horizon and pre-1984 New World Pictures libraries. Shout! Factory controls distribution rights in North America, Europe, Australia, and Russia, while Chinese company Ace Film HK Company signed distribution deals with Shout for China, most of Asia, Africa, and South America. Soon after the contract, Roger Corman and his wife, Julie Corman were sued by their sons, Roger and Brian, for ownership of the film library.

== Production and distribution ==
Concorde-New Horizons has produced over 122 films, including Bloodfist, Shadow Dancer, The Sea Wolf, Munchie Strikes Back, and Summer Camp Nightmare, and has distributed over 39 films, including Supergator, Slaughter Studios, Dragon Fire, and Eye of the Eagle. The New Concorde Home Entertainment concentrates on distribution, and has released over 90 films, including Dinocroc, Avalanche Alley, Humanoids from the Deep, Munchies, and The Slumber Party Massacre. Concorde Pictures, has produced 9 films, including Killer Instinct, Watchers II, Time Trackers, and The Drifter, and has distributed over 144 films, including Avalanche Alley, The Sea Wolf, Humanoids from the Deep, Star Hunter, and Wizards of the Lost Kingdom.

== Partial filmography ==
=== Millennium Films era ===
- Space Raiders (1983) - Millennium Film distributed by New World
- Screwballs (1983) - Maurice Smith, distributed by New World
- Suburbia (1983) - distributed by New World
- Deathstalker (1983) - Corman's Palo Alto company /Aries - distributed by New World
- The Warrior and the Sorceress (1984) - New Horizons/Aries - distributed by New World
- Love Letters (1984) - Millennium Film (shot in 1982) distributed by New World

=== Early Concorde Pictures releases ===
- School Spirit (1985) - from Chroma III (who also made Hardbodies)
- Wheels of Fire (1985) - Rodeo Productions
- Barbarian Queen (1985) - Rodeo Productions/Aries
- Wizards of the Lost Kingdom (1985) - Trinity Pictures/Aries
- The Devastator (1985) - Rodeo Productions
- Naked Vengeance (1985)
- Loose Screws (1985) (Screwballs II) - Maurice Smith

=== Concorde/Cinema Group releases ===
- KGB The Secret War (1985) - Cinema Group
- Streetwalkin' (1985) - Rodeo Productions
- Cocaine Wars (1985) - New Horizons/Aries
- The Dirt Bike Kid (1985) - produced by Julie Corman
- Born American (1986) aka Arctic Heat- from Cinema Group
- Killbots (1986) aka Chopping Mall - produced by Julie Corman for Trinity Productions
- Last Resort (1986) ala Club Sandwich - produced by Julie Corman for Trinity Pictures
- Hollywood Vice Squad (1986) - Cinema Group
- Starship Redwing (1987) aka Starship - a pick up from Australia
- Willy/Milly (1986) aka Something Special

=== Distributed by Concorde Pictures alone ===
- Vendetta (1986) - Chroma III
- Amazons (1986) - Aries/Concorde
- Recruits (1986) - Maurice Smith
- Sorority House Massacre (1986) - Concorde
- Hunter's Blood (1986) - Cineventure Inc.
- Stripped to Kill (1987)
- Equalizer 2000 (1987)
- Sweet Revenge (1987) - Motion Picture Corporation of America
- Purple People Eater (1988) - Motion Picture Corporation of America

=== Roger Corman Presents series ===
Films made for screening on Showtime as part of the series Roger Corman Presents.

- Suspect Device (1995)
- The Alien Within a.k.a. Unknown Origin (1995)
- Sawbones (1995)
- Virtual Seduction (1995)
- Bram Stoker's Burial of the Rats (1995)
- Not Like Us (1995)
- Black Scorpion (1995)
- The Wasp Woman (1995)
- Not of This Earth (1995)
- A Bucket of Blood a.k.a. Dark Secrets and The Death Artist (1995)
- Hellfire a.k.a. Blood Song (1995)
- Spectre a.k.a. House of the Damned (1996)
- Inhumanoid a.k.a. Circuit Breaker (1996)
- Alien Avengers a.k.a. Welcome to Planet Earth (1996)
- Shadow of a Scream (1996)
- Subliminal Seduction (1996)
- Last Exit to Earth (1996)
- Humanoids from the Deep (1996)
- Death Game (1996)
- Vampirella (1996)
- Scene of the Crime a.k.a. Ladykiller (1996)
- When the Bullet Hits the Bone (1996)
- Marquis de Sade a.k.a. Dark Prince: Intimate Tales of Marquis de Sade (1996)
- Black Scorpion II (1997)
- Alien Avengers II (1997)
- Spacejacked (1997)

=== Bloodfist series ===
- Bloodfist (1989)
- Bloodfist II (1990) (with Concord Production Inc.)
- Bloodfist III: Forced to Fight (1992)
- Bloodfist IV: Die Trying (1992)
- Bloodfist V: Human Target (1994)
- Bloodfist VI: Ground Zero (1995)
- Bloodfist VII: Manhunt (1995)
- Bloodfist VIII: Trained to Kill (1996)
- Bloodfist 2050 (2005)

=== Deathstalker series ===
- Deathstalker (1983)
- Deathstalker II (1987)
- Deathstalker and the Warriors from Hell (1988)
- Deathstalker IV: Match of Titans (1989)

=== Munchies series ===
- Munchies (1987)
- Munchie (1992)
- Munchie Strikes Back (1994)

=== Watchers series ===
- Watchers (1988) - with Carolco Pictures, distributed by Universal Pictures
- Watchers II (1990)
- Watchers III (1994)

=== Films shot in Peru ===
- Hour of the Assassin (1987)
- Crime Zone (1988)
- Heroes Stand Alone (1989)
- Full Fathom Five (1990)
- Ultra Warrior (1990)
- Crackdown (1991)
- Fire on the Amazon (1993)
- Eight Hundred Leagues Down the Amazon (1993)
- New Crime City (1994)
- Watchers III (1994)
- Eruption (1997)

=== Films shot in Argentina ===
- Deathstalker (1983)
- The Warrior and the Sorceress (1984)
- Wizards of the Lost Kingdom (1985)
- Barbarian Queen (1985)
- Cocaine Wars (1985)
- Amazons (1986)
- Deathstalker II (1987)
- Stormquest (1987)
- Two to Tango (1988)
- Play Murder for Me (1990)

=== Death Race series ===
- Death Race 2000 (1975)
- Death Race (2008)
- Death Race 2 (2010)
- Death Race 3: Inferno (2013)
- Death Race 2050 (2017)
- Death Race 4: Beyond Anarchy (2018)

=== Creature series ===
- Carnosaur (1993)
- Carnosaur 2 (1995)
- Carnosaur 3: Primal Species (1996)
- Raptor (2001)
- Dinocroc (2004)
- The Eden Formula (2006)
- Scorpius Gigantus (2006)
- Cry of the Winged Serpent (2006)
- Supergator (2007)
- Dinoshark (2010)
- Sharktopus (2010)
- Camel Spiders (2010)
- Dinocroc vs. Supergator (2010)
- Piranhaconda (2011)
- Sharktopus vs. Pteracuda (2014)
- Sharktopus vs. Whalewolf (2015)
- CobraGator (2018)

=== Production ===
- The Jungle Demon (2021)
- Abduction (2019)
- Fist of the Dragon (2015)
- Operation Rogue (2014)
- Water Wars (2014)
- Palace of the Damned (2013)
- Virtually Heroes (2013)
- Attack of the 50 Foot Cheerleader (2012)
- Stealing Las Vegas (2012)
- When Life Gives You Lemons (2010)
- Searchers 2.0 (2007)
- The Hunt for Eagle One: Crash Point (2006)
- Saurian (2006)
- The Hunt for Eagle One (2006)
- Asphalt Wars (2005)
- Rage and Discipline (2004)
- Ice Crawkers (2003)
- Barbarian (2003) (V)
- Slaughter Studios (2002)
- The Arena (2001/I)
- Kyoko (2000)
- Nightfall (2000)
- Moving Target (2000)
- The Prophet (1999)
- Future Fear (1998)
- Detonator (1997)
- Inferno (1997)
- Overdrive (1997)
- Shadow Dancer (1997)
- The Sea Wolf (1997)
- One Night Stand (1995)
- Stripteaser (1995)
- Baby Face Nelson (1995)
- Star Hunter (1995)
- White Wolves II: Legend of the Wild (1995)
- Stranglehold (1994)
- One Man Army (1994)
- Saturday Night Special (1994)
- The Crazysitter (1994)
- Angel of Destruction (1994)
- Firehawk (1993)
- Dragon Fire (1993)
- Kill Zone (film) (1993)
- Little Miss Millions (1993)
- Final Judgement (1992)
- The Unborn (1991)
- Field of Fire (1991)
- Uncaged (film) (1991)
- Killer Instinct (1991)
- The Haunting of Morella (1990)
- A Cry in the Wild (1990)
- Ultra Warrior (1990)
- Masque of the Red Death (1989)
- Nowhere to Run (1989)
- Time Trackers (1989)
- Crime Zone (1989)
- The Drifter (1988)
- Fast Gun (1988)
- The New Gladiators (1988)
- Summer Camp Nightmare (1987)
- Iris (1987)
- Eye of the Eagle (1987)
- Sorority House Massacre (1986)

==== Distribution ====
- The Interrogation of Muscular POW (2014; cancelled)
- The Erotic Misadventures of the Invisible Man (2003)
- Flyin' Ryan (2003)
- Book of Days (2003)
- Barbarian (2003)
- Firefight (2003)
- Slaughter Studios (2002)
- Shakedown (2002)
- Hope Ranch (2002) (TV)
- Mary Christmas (2002) (TV)
- Escape from Afghanistan (2002)
- Second to Die (2002)
- Disappearance (2002) (TV)
- Love Thy Neighbor (2002/I)
- Raptor (2001)
- Avalanche Alley (2001) (TV)
- A Girl, Three Guys, and a Gun (2001)
- The Arena (2001/I)
- Nightfall (2000)
- Take It to the Limit (2000)
- The Suicide Club (2000)
- Dangerous Curves (2000)
- Love 101 (2000)
- White Wolves III: Cry of the White Wolf (2000)
- The Doorway (2000)
- Watchers Reborn (1998)
- The Protector (1998/II)
- The Prophet (1999)
- Black Thunder (1998/II)
- The Sea Wolf (1997)
- Shadow Dancer (1997)
- Vampirella (1996) (V)
- House of the Damned (1996)
- Ladykiller (1996)
- Shadow Warriors (1996)
- Star Hunter (1995)
- Saturday Night Special (1994)
- Terminal Voyage (1994)
- The Unborn II (1994)
- Little Miss Millions (1993)
- Dragon Fire (1993)
- Stepmonster (1993)
- Voor een verloren soldaat (1992)
- Dance with Death (1991)
- Curse of the Crystal Eye (1991)
- Killer Instinct (1991)
- Corporate Affairs (1990)
- Watchers II (1990)
- A Cry in the Wild (1990)
- Full Fathom Five (1990)
- Slumber Party Massacre III (1990)
- A Cry in the Wild (1990)
- Schweitzer (1990)
- Ultra Warrior (1990)
- Brain Dead (1990)
- Flesh Gordon Meets the Cosmic Cheerleaders (1989)
- Think Big (1989)
- Transylvania Twist (1989)
- Food of the Gods II (1989)
- The Terror Within (1989)
- Barbarian Queen II: The Empress Strikes Back (1989)
- Lords of the Deep (1989)
- Nowhere to Run (1989)
- Time Trackers (1989)
- Saturday the 14th Strikes Back (1988)
- The Drifter (1988)
- Not of This Earth (1988)
- Nightfall (1988)
- Slumber Party Massacre II (1987)
- Summer Camp Nightmare (1987)
- Sweet Revenge (1987)
- Eye of the Eagle (1987)
- Ciske de Rat (1984)
- Emmanuelle IV (1984)

== Notes ==
- Corman, Roger; Jerome, Jim (1998). How I made a hundred movies in Hollywood and never lost a dime.
- Gray, Beverly (2004). Roger Corman : blood-sucking vampires, flesh-eating cockroaches, and driller killers.
- Koetting, Christopher T (2013). Mind warp! : the fantastic true story of Roger Corman's New World Pictures.
