= Renata Flores =

Peruvian singer

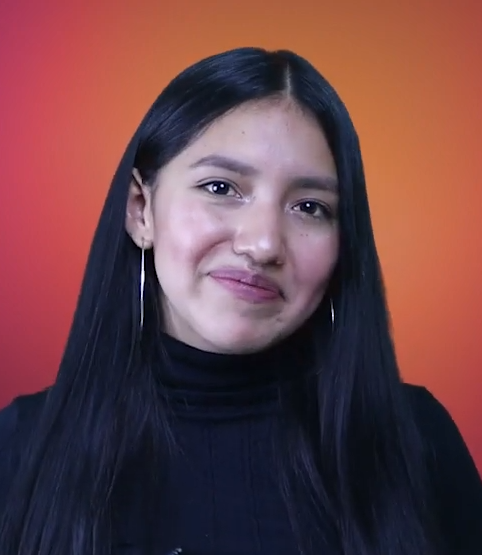
- Renata Flores in 2019
- Born: March 20, 2001 (age 25); Huamanga, Peru
- Education: San Cristóbal National University
- Occupation: Singer-Songwriter
- Known for: Quechua-language trap songs, indigenous activism, song covers translated to Quechua

Renata Flores Rivera (born March 20, 2001) is a Peruvian singer, made famous in South America by a viral Quechua cover of Michael Jackson's "The Way You Make Me Feel", released in 2015.

== Career ==
Flores began studying Quechua at the age of 13, and, growing in fluency, continued to do so at university. She translated "The Way You Make Me Feel" with help from Ada, her 72-year-old grandmother. In 2014, she participated in "The Voice Kids Peru", a Peruvian talent show. She went on to release several original trap songs in her ancestral language of Quechua, the lyrics often addressing issues faced by indigenous communities in Peru.

In March 2021, Flores released her first album, Isqun, largely in Quechua. She also appeared (again speaking Quechua) in adverts for a perfume brand. In 2024, she acted in the drama film Tattoos in Memory directed by Luis Llosa. In August 2024, she presented a quechua version of "Aguita del Equilibiro" with Alejandro y María Laura.

== Singles ==
=== As lead artist ===
Title	Year	Album
Mirando la Misma Luna	2018	Single
Miradas	2018	Single
Tijeras	2018	Single
Qam Hina	2019	Single
