= The Terror Within II =

1991 film directed by Andrew Stevens

- Directed by: Andrew Stevens
- Written by: Andrew Stevens
- Produced by: Mike Elliott
- Starring: Andrew Stevens; Stella Stevens; Chick Vennera; R. Lee Ermey; Burton Gilliam; Clare Hoak
- Cinematography: Janusz Kaminski
- Edited by: Brent Schoenfeld
- Music by: Terry Plumeri
- Distributed by: New Concorde
- Release date: January 18, 1991
- Running time: 85 minutes
- Country: United States
- Language: English

The Terror Within II is a 1991 American science fiction horror film and a sequel to the 1989 film The Terror Within. It is written and directed by star Andrew Stevens (reprising his role from the first film), and also stars R. Lee Ermey, Chick Vennera, Barbara Alyn Woods, Gordon Currie, and Stella Stevens.

It was executive produced by Roger Corman, and is one of the early films of future Academy Award-winning cinematographer Janusz Kamiński.

In the film, most of humanity has already died due to a plague pandemic. The last surviving humans have fortified themselves in the Rocky Mountains, but hostile mutants invade their stronghold.

== Premise ==
A plague has wiped out most of humanity. The last human colony struggles to survive in a bunker under the Rocky Mountains, while the surface has become a land of nightmarish mutants who seek to destroy the colony. A vaccine has been developed for a disease spread by the mutants, but gathering the components to make it requires returning to the surface.

Scientist David Pennington (Stevens) is dispatched to the surface to obtain the needed materials. Pennington meets a pregnant woman on the surface. While trying to get her and the needed materials back to the colony, they are attacked.

The mutants break inside humanity's final stronghold, the battle for survival pits the human colonists against their deadly invaders miles below the Earth's surface.

== Cast ==
- Andrew Stevens as David
- Chick Vennera as Kyle
- R. Lee Ermey as Von Demming
- Stella Stevens as Kara
- Burton Gilliam as Dewitt
- Clare Hoak as Ariel
- Barbara Alyn Woods as Sharon
- Gordon Currie as Aaron
- Renée Jones as Robin
- Pete Koch as the Mutant

== Release ==
=== Home media ===
The film was released for the first time on DVD by Code Red on October 10, 2017.

== Reception ==
TV Guide awarded the film two out of four stars, calling the film "dull" and criticized the film's characters and special effects. Film critic Leonard Maltin gave the film one and a half out of four stars, writing, "Debuting director (and star) Stephens, looking like Rambo, fogs the cheap sets and shows a few good ideas, but his own absurd story sinks it all."

Creature Feature gave the film two out of five stars, finding the actor-director Stevens performs well in the role. It stated that fans of the genre will find it worth the time.
