= The Drifter (1988 film) =

1988 film

- DVD release cover
- Directed by: Larry Brand
- Written by: Larry Brand
- Produced by: Roger Corman
- Starring: Kim Delaney; Timothy Bottoms; Al Shannon; Miles O'Keeffe
- Cinematography: David Sperling
- Edited by: Stephen Mark
- Music by: Rick Conrad
- Distributed by: Concorde Pictures; MGM/UA Home Entertainment
- Release date: June 3, 1988
- Running time: 89 minutes
- Country: United States
- Language: English

The Drifter is a 1988 thriller movie starring Kim Delaney, Timothy Bottoms, Al Shannon, Miles O'Keeffe and Anna Garduno. The film is about a successful single woman who picks up a mysterious hitchhiker on a deserted road.

The film was directed and written by Larry Brand.

== Plot ==
Julia Robbins (Kim Delaney) is an emerging fashion designer returning home to Los Angeles after a sales trip in San Francisco. She passes a hitchhiker or a drifter (Miles O'Keeffe) on her way back to the 5. They lock eyes but she drives on. During lunch at the Hillside diner, she notices a mysterious man eating by himself. The hitchhiker enters the diner, and they make eye contact. Outside, he asks her for a ride, but Julia declines. As she drives off, she notices she has a flat tire. The drifter, who gives his name as Trey fixes it for her, and she decides to give him a ride.

At a motel that night, she offers him a ride into L.A. in the morning. That night it is raining heavily outside and Trey asks to sleep in her car. Instead, she ushers him into her room, and Julia says “no words it will be like it never happened” and they have passionate sex. The next morning she wakes up in his arms. As they are dressing for the day, Trey notices an old gold pocket watch Julia is wearing and she explains her grandfather gifting it to her as a child, explaining it will protect her through life. They drive back to Los Angeles and Trey drops Julia off At Oki Dog in West Hollywood. Julia at this point indicates that she wants to leave things at a one-night stand. They then embrace and she gives Trey her pocket watch as a souvenir of the night before, before driving off. She reaches her apartment, and her boyfriend Arthur (Timothy Bottoms) is waiting for her inside, as well as her cat Steve. Arthur, not knowing about Julia’s affair the night before, waits while she showers and they then have sex. While making love, the phone rings. They ignore it but Julia is uneasy. The next day at her work, Julia’s good friend Matty (Anna Garduno) drops by and they go out to lunch on her lunch break. Matty tells Julia she is pregnant by her boyfriend and they are planning a wedding. The two celebrate. Later that night Julia returns home from work and gets a mysterious call which turns out to be Trey. He wants to see her and Julia declines but he tells her “I can wait” before they hang up. Next day at work Julia gets a call from Trey and he still wants to meet her. Julia goes to meet him at the Oki Dog again and tells him to leave her alone moving forward and to stop calling as she just wanted a one night stand with him. They part, and as Julia leaves she notices a mysterious man in a car watching her.

Julia is guilt-ridden over the affair, confessing what happened to Matty. Matty asks what Trey is like, Julia says he is different. Julia also reveals to Matty he could be dangerous. Eventually, Trey meets Julia again, this time in her office, in front of all her coworkers. He again asks for her to be with him, in another attempt to win her back which unnerves her. He leaves and Julia gets so nervous she goes to throw up. Julia and Arthur go out to dinner that night and he is suspicious of Julia’s actions lately. Julia says nothing. Later that night she tries to call the cops for help but because her boyfriend Arthur is a criminal lawyer she doesn’t report what’s been happening for fear he will find out. Arthur and Julia go on a date the next day and Arthur questions why she isn’t wearing her grandfather’s watch. Julia explains it stopped but this doesn’t satisfy Arthur. Arthur later meets with a private investigator, who turns out to be the mysterious man from the diner and who saw Julia at Oki Dog. He has been trailing Julia, and he breaks the news of her affair to Arthur. The detective makes some cryptic remarks to Arthur about killing women. Later that night after going grocery shopping, Julia sees she has a flat tire again, this time with a knife in it. She finally goes to a private investigator named Morrison for help and she tells her story and looks at criminal photos. After this she heads to Arthur’s house for casual sex and wine drinking and she spends the night there afterwards. Julia isn’t aware Arthur knows of her affair. Next morning, Matty calls Julia to meet up and she tearfully tells her that her boyfriend isn’t ready for marriage and taking care of their baby. Julia tells Matty it will blow over and they arrange a sleepover at her place.

Later, at Julia's apartment, Matty is found dead in her bed. She has been brutally murdered and a shocked/terrified Julia goes to Morrison again, begging for help. She reveals to Morrison she slept with the drifter and believes him to be the murderer although Morrison doesn’t think so. Arthur, who finds out, collects her from the police station and takes her and her cat to stay at his house. Morrison has been interviewing different inmates who have dealt with Arthur and gathering more evidence. Meanwhile, Julia and Arthur’s relationship has become more and more tense and Arthur reveals to Julia he found out about her affair but forgives her. Later that night as Julia gets ready for bed she hears noises and in the climax to the film, Julia finds Arthur dead in his study from a gunshot to the head. While Julia stands there, numb and shocked, The mysterious detective that had been trailing her emerges from hiding and attacks her, binding her hands. He then drags Julia to Arthur’s bed and ties her hands together in back of her and sits her upright. He eventually explains that he was snooping on Julia at her apartment when Matty showed up, and he had to kill her to cover his tracks. Arthur was not comfortable with the murder, and the detective killed him to prevent him from going to the police. He viciously taunts and emotionally abuses Julia and says she is dirty for cheating on Arthur even though Arthur had been a cheating boyfriend. Julia is punched to the floor but gets up with her hands freed pointing her revolver at the detective who then hits her and drags her down the stairs. He shoots a man who has entered the home. Then he ties Julia up to a living room chair. Intent on kiling her to complete his cover up, they are surprised by Trey, the man he shot before. (The detective had shot him, but did not kill him). Trey subdues the detective. Julia becomes free from being tied and Morrison arrives at the house and kicks in the front door, with his gun drawn. Thinking that he will shoot Trey, Julia cries out to stop him. A shot rings out, but Morrison has killed the detective, who had drawn a hidden pistol and was about to kill Julia. With the detective dead, Trey goes to Julia and he reveals that the pocket watch she gave him was what saved him from the detective’s bullet. He embraces her, and she realizes she found her true love. The ending of the movie sees Julia and Trey, together on a beach, with her cat at their feet, happily ever after. (The last scene is sometimes edited out in some versions of this film).

== Production notes ==
The cook in the diner at the beginning of the film is played by Bruce Vilanch. The script perpetually refers to 'The War'. At one point, Julia asks Trey if he served in 'the War'. In Morrison's office, there is a portrait of Richard Nixon. Even in the late 1980s, Vietnam was a powerful theme for Brand, who cast himself as Morrison. One of the central characters in Backfire, which he co-wrote in 1987 is also a Vietnam veteran.

There are several editing errors in The Drifter. Most notably, during the final confrontation between Julia and the detective, a boom mike is visible at the top of the shot.

(The boom mike is visible in that shot because on the VHS, where the film's original 1.85:1 aspect ratio is compromised and cropped to a TV ratio of 1.33:1, the viewer sees more vertical information than the director intended.)

== Reviews ==
Derek Winnert in 2022 reviewed it as a "tense, eerie, credible thriller". But Kevin Thomas from the LA Times notes that the director "tries so hard to avoid the predictable lady-in-distress formula that he ends up overreaching disastrously".
