= Anthony Peck =

American actor (1947–1996)

- Born: Carmen Anthony Pecchio; March 20, 1947; Youngstown, Ohio, U.S.
- Died: July 30, 1996 (aged 49); Beverly Hills, California, U.S.
- Occupation: Actor
- Years active: 1979–1996
- Spouse: Fran Tolstonog (1982–1996) (his death) 1 child

Anthony Peck (born Carmen Anthony Pecchio; March 20, 1947 – July 20, 1996) was an American actor. He was born in Youngstown, Ohio.

He earned his Bachelor of Arts degree at the University of Toledo and his Master of Fine Arts degree in Acting from Temple University.

He appeared in several of John McTiernan's films, such as Die Hard, The Hunt for Red October, Last Action Hero, and Die Hard with a Vengeance. Other appearances include Creator, Unbecoming Age, In the Line of Fire, The Enemy Within, and Carnosaur 3: Primal Species.

He also appeared in many television show such as Knots Landing, Knight Rider, Dallas, Beauty and the Beast, and Quantum Leap.

Anthony Peck died of cancer on July 30, 1996, at the age of 49.

== Partial filmography ==
Year	Title	Role	Notes
1985	Knight Rider	Jorge	
1985	Creator	Norman	
1986	Hunter	Ray Ramon	3 Episodes
1986	The Young & The Restless	Mike	30 Episodes
1987	Hill Street Blues	Fratelli	
1987	Beauty & The Beast	Red	
1987	Who's The Boss	Jack Smith	
1988	The Bronx Zoo	Mr. Barris	
1988	Knot's Landing	Dr. James Miller	2 Episodes
1988	Die Hard	Officer	Credited as Young Cop
1989	Dallas	Mike	
1990	Days of Our Lives	Porter Rollins	28 Episodes
1990	The Hunt for Red October	Lieutenant Commander Thompson - USS Dallas	
1992	Quantum Leap	Judge	
1992	P.S.I. Luv U	Malone	
1992	Unbecoming Age	Jake	
1993	Last Action Hero	Cop At Ex-Wife's House	
1993	In the Line of Fire	FBI Official	
1994	The Enemy Within	Treasury Secretary Tom Monroe	
1995	Die Hard with a Vengeance	NYPD Detective Ricky Walsh	
1996	Carnosaur 3: Primal Species	General Pete Mercer	(final film role)
