= Liz Adams =

- Dallas character
- Barbara Stock as Liz Adams
- Portrayed by: Barbara Stock
- Duration: 1990–91
- First appearance: April 27, 1990; The Southfork Wedding Jinx
- Last appearance: March 29, 1991; When the Wind Blows
- Created by: Leonard Katzman
In-universe information
- Occupation: Owner of oil company; Government Agent
- Siblings: Ace Adams

Elizabeth Adams is a fictional character that appeared in the later seasons of the popular American television series Dallas, played by actress Barbara Stock from 1990 to 1991. She first appeared in the season 13 episode "The Southfork Wedding Jinx" and remained in the series during the final season.

== Storylines ==
Liz arrives in Dallas as an old friend of Bobby Ewing's and meets Cliff Barnes. Liz's recently deceased brother left her an oil company and she wishes to sell it. Cliff tries to convince her to stay in Dallas and has her meet with WestStar boss Carter McKay. Liz and Carter instantly recognize each other and Liz tells Cliff she knew Carter when she lived in New York but his name wasn't Carter McKay. Later, McKay and Liz mutually agree to not discuss their past now that they are both in Dallas. It transpires that Liz and Carter knew a dangerous criminal known as Johnny Dancer. Liz was a government agent and acting as his girlfriend in order to turn him in. Liz is pressured by her former employer to continue their plan. Liz obeys but Johnny is murdered and Liz, Carter and Cliff become suspects. When Carter is arrested and charged with Johnny's murder, Cliff admits he killed Johnny in self-defense. Later, Liz sells her oil company to J.R. Ewing in exchange for getting Cliff the Energy Czar job in Washington. However, when Cliff discovers this he breaks up with Liz and she disappears from Dallas.

== Trivia ==
Barbara Stock previously appeared in Dallas playing Heather Wilson in season 5 for 2 episodes.
