= Katt Shea =

American actress and producer (born 1959)

- Born: Kathleen Ann Shea; October 9, 1959 (age 66); Detroit, Michigan, US
- Other name: Katt Shea Ruben
- Education: University of Michigan
- Occupations: Actress; director
- Spouse: Andy Ruben (m. 1979; div. 1992)
- Website: kattshea.com

Kathleen Ann Shea (born October 9, 1959) is an American actress, film director, and acting teacher. She is best known for directing the erotic thriller Poison Ivy, which was nominated for the 1992 Sundance Grand Jury Prize.

== Early life ==
Kathleen Ann Shea was born on October 9, 1959, in Detroit, Michigan to an artist father and nurse mother. She studied teaching at the University of Michigan from which she graduated with honors. After graduating, she spent six months teaching blind children, before taking off at age 19 to Hollywood, California where she started her early modeling career and for a short time attended University of California, Los Angeles.

"I was directing plays I'd written in my back yard when I was twelve", she said later. "I was a total misfit and didn't have any friends, so that's what I did instead. I recruited younger kids from the neighborhood, and their parents paid me to put them in my productions. I made some pretty good money, actually. Helped put me through college. Yay for being a misfit! Yay for not having friends!"

=== Acting career ===
Shea worked as an actor and model for a number of years, including appearing in a small role in Scarface and Psycho III.

"I was never comfortable being an actress", she said in a 1992 interview. "It was the most ridiculous thing; I am like the antithesis of that. I really, truly am very shy. ... I did it for seven years, and I can't believe I lived through that".

=== Writing and directing career ===
In 1986, she was on location in the Philippines when she struck up a friendship with Andy Ruben. The two of them started writing scripts together, and succeeded in getting The Patriot (1986) made for Roger Corman. Corman agreed to finance another Ruben-Shea script with Shea directing, Stripped to Kill. The resulting movie was successful and launched her directorial career.

Shea made a number of films for Corman based on scripts by herself and Ruben. Corman later described her as a "talented director. She's particularly good with actors, having been an actress herself. She's taught herself about the camera and has gotten better with each picture."

In a 1990 review of Streets, the Los Angeles Times said Shea "continues to show that she is a first-rate talent, as terrific at handling hard action with style and dispatch as a drawing the best from her casts."

According to Corman, the films she made for him cost less than $500,000 on average and made between $5–10 million. She was then hired by New Line to make Poison Ivy which was a critical and popular hit.

In 1992, her films were honoured with a four-day retrospective at the Museum of Modern Art including the New York premiere of Poison Ivy. According to Larry Karidish, a curator of film at the museum:

Katt's work is distinctive for its style, rhythm, the progression of its narrative. Her movies touch something deep in the psyche. They have a consistent and coherent sensibility and I thought it would make sense to show her work as a body.

In 2019, she directed Sophia Lillis and Linda Lavin in the feature film Nancy Drew and The Hidden Staircase for Warner Bros. In 2022, she directed Rescued By Ruby for Netflix.

Between directing jobs, she works as an acting coach, where her past clients have included Christina Applegate, Alison Lohman, Sophia Lillis, and Drew Barrymore.

== Personal life ==
Katt Shea married collaborator Andy Ruben. They divorced in 1992 after 13 years of marriage.

== Select credits ==
As actor
Year	Title	Role	Notes
1980	The Asphalt Cowboy	Rita	
1983	My Tutor	Mud Wrestler	
1983	Scarface	Woman at Babylon Club	
1984	Preppies	Margot	
1984	Hollywood Hot Tubs	Dee-Dee	
1984	R.S.V.P.	Rhonda Rivers	Television film
1985	Barbarian Queen	Estrild	
1986	Psycho III	Patsy Boyle	
1986	The Devastator	Audrey	Also 2nd unit photography
1996	Last Exit to Earth	Surgeon Athena	Television film
1999	The Rage: Carrie 2	Deputy D.A.	Cameo
2022	Rescued by Ruby	Clicker Trainer	

As Director/Writer
Year	Title	Role	Notes
1986	The Patriot	Writer	
1987	Stripped to Kill	Director and writer	
1989	Dance of the Damned	Director and writer	
1989	Stripped to Kill II: Live Girls	Director and writer	
1990	Streets	Director and writer	
1992	Poison Ivy	Director and writer	Nominated for Grand Jury Prize at Sundance
1992	Dance with Death	Story	
1994	Joe Bob's Drive-In Theater	Director	
1996	Last Exit to Earth	Director and writer	Television film
1999	The Rage: Carrie 2	Director and writer	
2000	Sharing the Secret	Director	Television film
2001	Sanctuary	Director and writer	Television film
2019	Nancy Drew and the Hidden Staircase	Director	
2022	Rescued by Ruby	Director	

=== Unmade projects ===
- Prince Ombra (c 1993) from novel by Roderick MacLeish for producer Sydney Pollack
- Dance of the Damned (c. 2011) – proposed remake of her earlier film
- The Tutor – adapted from the novel by Peter Abrahams
- The List – a teen drama based on her own script
- Hystere, Imps of Perversity – horror anthology TV series developed with Mary Lambert
