= Star Hunter =

- Directed by: Cole S. McKay; Fred Olen Ray
- Screenplay by: M.B. Dick; Mark Litton; R.J. Robertson
- Produced by: Sam Newfield; Raymond Reynolds
- Starring: Roddy McDowall; Stella Stevens
- Cinematography: Gary Graver; Mark Melville
- Edited by: Robert L. Goodman; Vaniak Monadian
- Production company: Concorde-New Horizons
- Release dates: 1996 (Spain); February 17, 1998 (U.S.)
- Running time: 89 minutes
- Country: United States
- Language: English

Star Hunter is a 1996 science fiction film directed by Cole S. McKay and Fred Olen Ray, and starring Roddy McDowall and Stella Stevens. The eponymous character is an alien who travels through space seeking species to hunt for pleasure. He arrives on Earth, landing in Los Angeles, and is soon in pursuit of a teacher and her students, whose bus broke down on the way home from a football game.

== Plot ==
Two aliens escape from prison and begin traveling throughout the galaxy, hunting species on different planets for fun. The hunters set up on Earth, and begin terrorizing a group of high school students whose bus has broken down after a school football game. The aliens set up a force field around the area to prevent the teens and their chaperone from receiving any outside aid.

The students seek safety in the house of a blind man who, unknown to them, is actually one of the hunters. The aliens force the teens to fight a robot, named Star Hunter. The students improvise weapons, but these prove ineffective against Star Hunter.

Officers from the alien prison arrive; known as trackers, they are in pursuit of the escapees. They attempt to help the teens. One tracker takes control of a student, but the alien is hindered by his unfamiliarity with human emotions.

== Cast ==
- Roddy McDowall as Riecher
- Stella Stevens as Mrs. March
- Rebecca Budig as Carrie
- Kenn Scott as Pichel
- Zack Ward as Cooper
- Sean P. Donahue as Spivak (credited as Sean Donahue)
- Alexander Keith as Leslie (credited as Wendy Schumacher)
- Gregg Brazzel as Star Hunter
- Fred Olen Ray as Tracker
- Steve Barkett as Street Bum
- Tripp Reed as Junkie
- Ted Monte as Kyle
- Bob Bragg as Cop
- John Brandon as John Taylor
- Hoke Howell as Jack Turner

== Production ==
Fred Olen Ray reshot half an hour of the film for $11,000.

Stella Stevens was proud of having worked with Roddy McDowall.

== Reception ==
This movie has no score on Rotten Tomatoes. It also received one star from Creature Feature, which liked the movie’s premise, but called its execution hokey and amateurish. Moria gave the movie a rating of zero.

== Home release ==
As of November 2020, the movie as available on Amazon Prime.
