= Barbara Stock =

American actress

- Born: May 26, 1956 (age 70); Downers Grove, Illinois, U.S.
- Education: Indiana University
- Occupation: Actress
- Years active: 1980–2001
- Spouse: Bill Dunn (m. 1988)

Barbara Stock (born May 26, 1956) is an American former actress, best known for roles as Susan Silverman in ABC crime drama series Spenser: For Hire (1985–1988), and as Liz Adams in CBS primetime soap opera Dallas (1990–1991); she also appeared in the role of Heather Wilson in two episodes in season five of the series.

== Early years ==
Born in Downers Grove, Illinois, Stock earned a bachelor's degree in telecommunications from Indiana University (IU). Broadcasting and singing were her main interests before she became an actress. During her time at IU she sang with the university's vocal group, The Singing Hoosiers, and for one year she hosted a morning talk program on WTTV television. Following her college graduation she attended the Musical Theater Workshop in Los Angeles.

== Career ==
She played Claudia in the Tommy Tune-directed, Tony Award-winning musical Nine on Broadway, replacing Shelley Burch in the original cast in 1983. She is best known for her appearances in the prime-time drama Spenser: For Hire for two non-consecutive seasons (1985–1986; 1987–1988) as Susan Silverman, the love interest of Spenser (Robert Urich).

Stock starred in the final season of CBS primetime soap opera Dallas from 1990 to 1991 as Liz Adams, the fiancée of Cliff Barnes (Ken Kercheval). She later starred in the ABC primetime soap opera miniseries Trade Winds as Grace Sommers. She also appeared in "The Subway", an episode of Seinfeld, where she enticed George Costanza (Jason Alexander) off a subway, took him to a hotel, then handcuffed him to a bed and robbed him of eight dollars and all of his clothes. In 1997, Stock had a recurring role on the now-defunct ABC daytime soap opera Port Charles as Nicole Devlin.

Stock appeared in more than 100 hours of television and made over 30 guest appearances on television shows, including CHiPs; The Facts of Life; Fantasy Island; Remington Steele; Knight Rider; The A-Team ; Moonlighting; Murder, She Wrote; The Twilight Zone; MacGyver; Touched by an Angel; and Charmed. Her final screen appearance was in the 2001 television film The Princess & the Marine alongside Mark-Paul Gosselaar.

After she left acting, Stock started an interior design firm whose clientele were generally in Los Angeles and the San Fernando Valley.

== Personal life ==
Stock married producer Bill Dunn in 1988. They met when she was working on the film Verne Miller and he was its executive producer.

== Filmography ==
Year	Title	Role	Notes
1980	Fantasy Island	Pru	Episode: "The Love Doctor/Pleasure Palace/Possessed"
1981	CHiPs	Officer Paula Woods	Episodes: "Ponch's Angels: Part 1" and "Ponch's Angels: Part 2"
1981–1991	Dallas	Heather Wilson / Liz Adams	Episodes: "The Split" and "Head of the Family" (season 5) and 17 episodes in seasons 13–14
1982	I, Desire	Mona	
1982	The Facts of Life	Nurse Barbara Burton	Episode: "The Big Fight"
1983	Bring 'Em Back Alive		Episode: "To Kill a Princess"
1983	T. J. Hooker	Amy Robbins	Episode: "Too Late for Love"
1983	Fantasy Island	Abby Poutreau	Episode: "King of Burlesque/Death Games"
1983	Remington Steele	Kitty Curtain	Episode: "Steele's Gold"
1984	The A-Team	Girl in Red Ferrari	Episode: "Deadly Maneuvers"
1984	The Yellow Rose	Lila Devereaux	Episode: "Chains of Fear"
1984	Knight Rider	Margo Sheridan	Episode: "Knight of the Drones"
1984	Mike Hammer	Lenore Wiggin	Episode: "24 Karat Dead"
1985	Otherworld	Scarla Raye	TV Mini-Series
1985	Berrenger's	Debbie	Episodes: "Dangerous Ground" and "Roll Tape"
1985	Moonlighting	Laura Boyd	Episode: "The Next Murder You Hear"
1985	Street Hawk	Elizabeth Morgan	Episode: "The Arabian"
1985	Scene of the Crime	Sharon Bryce	Episode: "A Vote for Murder"
1985	Wizards of the Lost Kingdom	Udea	
1986	Long Time Gone	Georgia Diablo	
1986	Murder, She Wrote	Daniella Morgana Carmody	Episodes: "Death Stalks the Big Top: Part 1" and "Death Stalks the Big Top: Part 2"
1986	Sidekicks	Catherine Sable	Episode: "Catherine the Not-So-Great"
1987	Mike Hammer	Marie Riviere	Episode: "Mike Gets Married"
1987	The Verne Miller Story	Vi Miles	
1985–1986, 1987–1988	Spenser: For Hire	Susan Silverman	Series regular, 43 episodes
1988	The Twilight Zone	Mary McNeal	Episode: "Memories"
1988	In the Heat of the Night	Jacqueline 'Jackie' Holt	Episode: "Hot Nights"
1989	Father Dowling Mysteries	Jessica Ford	Episode: "The Missing Body Mystery"
1989	MacGyver	Dr. Laura Sand	Episode: "The Ten Percent Solution"
1990–1991	Dallas	Liz Adams	Series regular, 26 episodes
1991	Pacific Station	Cary Fiedler	Episode: "Bob's Son"
1992	Seinfeld	Scam Woman	Episode: "The Subway"
1993	Hearts Afire	Jan Lindsay	Episode: "Class Reunion"
1993	Trade Winds	Grace Sommers	TV Mini-Series
1995	Touched by an Angel	Jill Bennett	Episode: "Trust"
1996	Hijacked: Flight 285	Veronica Mitchell	
1997	Port Charles	Nicole Devlin	Recurring role
1997	Baywatch	Dr. Meyers	Episode: "Eel Nino"
1998	Charmed	Mrs. Grace Spencer	Episode: "The Wedding from Hell"
2001	The Princess & the Marine	Susan	
