= Barbara Alyn Woods =

American actress

- Occupation: Actress
- Years active: 1988–present
- Spouse: John Lind (m. 1999; div. 2021)
- Children: Natalie; Emily; Alyvia

Barbara Alyn Woods is an American actress. She is known for her roles in television series One Tree Hill and Honey, I Shrunk the Kids. She is the mother of actors Natalie Alyn Lind, Emily Alyn Lind, and Alyvia Alyn Lind.

== Career ==
Woods has acted professionally since 1988. She is known for portraying Deborah "Deb" Scott on the WB/CW teen drama series One Tree Hill. She starred in the show from 2003 to 2009 and appeared on the final season in 2012. She started out recurring in season 1 and was upgraded to full series regular status in November sweeps. Due to the format change of the show she only appeared in four episodes of season 5 but returned as a series regular in season 6.

Woods played the lead role in the 1993 USA Network prime-time soap opera Eden, which was canceled after 26 episodes. Woods posed nude for the June 1993 issue of Playboy as part of a promotion for the television series Eden. She is also known for the role as Diane Szalinski on Honey, I Shrunk the Kids: The TV Show which ran from 1997 to 2000.

In the early 1990s, Woods starred in several films such as Circuitry Man (1990), The Terror Within II (1991), Delusion (1991), The Waterdance (1992), Flesh and Bone (1993), Ghoulies IV (1994) and Frankie Starlight (1995). She also appeared in Demi Moore's film Striptease in 1996.

Woods also has appeared in guest roles on numerous television series, including Star Trek: The Next Generation, Married... with Children, The Golden Girls, Picket Fences, Seinfeld, Murder, She Wrote, Touched by an Angel, Dream On, Desperate Housewives and was recurring on ABC's The Gates in 2010.

== Personal life ==
Woods attended Hinsdale South High School in Darien, Illinois and Northern Illinois University. She was married to John Lind (an assistant director), whom she met on the set of Honey, I Shrunk the Kids: The TV Show. They were married in 1999 and divorced in 2021. They have three daughters, Natalie, Emily and Alyvia, who are all film and television actresses.

== Filmography ==
=== Film ===
Year	Title	Role	Notes
1990	Circuitry Man	Yoyo	
1990	Repossessed	Woman in Elevator	
1991	The Terror Within II	Sharon	
1991	Inside Out	Terri	Segment: "Brush Strokes"
1991	Delusion	Julie	
1992	The Waterdance	Annabelle Lee	
1992	Dance with Death	Kelly	
1992	We're Talking Serious Money	Baggage Claim Agent	
1993	Flesh and Bone	Cindy	
1994	Ghoulies IV	Kate	Direct-to-video film
1995	Frankie Starlight	Marcia	
1996	Striptease	Lorelei	
1996	Just Friends	Danielle	
2001	The Confidence Man	Hillary	
2004	The Wild Card	Kathleen Flanagan	Direct-to-video film
2009	Port City	Hannah	
2012	Taste It: A Comedy About the Recession	Mrs. Rosen	
2019	Walk. Ride. Rodeo.	Jenna Walters	

=== Television ===
Year	Title	Role	Notes
1988	Sable	Cheri	Episode 1.07 "Mob"
1989	Star Trek: The Next Generation	Kareen Brianon	Episode 2.06 "The Schizoid Man"
1989	Married... with Children	Vicky	Episode 3.08 "The Gypsy Cried"
1989	Open House	Noreen	Episode 1.07 "Let's Get Physicals"
1990	Mr. Belvedere	Paula	Episode 6.20 "Mumsy"
1990	Equal Justice	Lisa Cummings / Heidi Peckle	Episode 1.05 "Start of the Fire"
1991	The Golden Girls	Woman	Episode 7.03 "Beauty and the Beast"
1991	Empty Nest	Stewardess	Episode 4.12 "My Nurse Is Back and There's Gonna Be Trouble..."
1992	Vinnie & Bobby	Miss O'Seasons	Episode 1.02 "It's in the Bag"
1992	Herman's Head	Danielle	Episode 2.01 "Stop Me Before I Help Again"
1992	A House of Secrets and Lies	Kim	Television film
1992, 1995	Dream On	Phoebe / Linda	Episodes 3.21 "It Came from Beneath the Sink" and 6.05 "9 1/2 Days"
1993	Sweating Bullets	Tess	Episode 3.30 "Tess"
1993	Wings	Sheila	Episode 5.10 "Come Fly with Me"
1993	Eden	Eve Sinclair	Main role, 26 episodes
1994	One West Waikiki	Heather Randall	Episode 1.03 "Terminal Island"
1994	Picket Fences	Stacey Halford	Episodes 2.14 "Supreme Courting" and 3.08 "May It Please the Court"
1995	Seinfeld	Debby	Episode 6.13 "The Scofflaw"
1995	Dead Weekend	Amelia	Television film
1996	Murder, She Wrote	Dyan Emery	Episode 12.16 "Murder Among Friends"
1996	Touched by an Angel	Penny Russell	Episode: "Birthmarks"
1999	Ally McBeal	Kelly Philbrick	Episode 2.22 "Love's Illusions"
1997–2000	Honey, I Shrunk the Kids	Diane Szalinski	Main role, 66 episodes
2002	Providence	Heidi	Episode 5.05 "Things That Go Bump in the Night"
2003	American Dreams	Mrs. Mason	Episodes 1.12 "Great Expectations" and 2.02 "R-E-S-P-E-C-T"
2003–2009, 2012	One Tree Hill	Deborah "Deb" Scott	Main role (seasons 1–4, 6); Guest role (seasons 5, 9) —106 episodes
2004	I Downloaded a Ghost	Catherine Blackstone	Television film
2009	Desperate Housewives	Laura Miller	Episode 6.05 "Everybody Ought to Have a Maid"
2010	The Gates	Barbara Jansen	Episodes 1.04–1.06 "The Monster Within", "Repercussions", "Jurisdiction"
2014	The Goldbergs	Mrs. Caldwell	Episodes 1.12 "You're Under Foot" and 1.14 "You Opened the Door"
2014	Death Clique	Lana	Television film
2021–2022	Chucky	Michelle Cross	Recurring role
