= Rescued by Ruby =

2022 film by Katt Shea

- Official release poster
- Directed by: Katt Shea
- Written by: Karen Janszen
- Based on: The Dogwink Ruby short story from the book Dogwinks by Squire Rushnell and Louise DuArt
- Produced by: Dan Angel; Jane Charles; Brian Gott
- Starring: Grant Gustin; Scott Wolf; Kaylah Zander
- Cinematography: David Bercovici-Artieda
- Edited by: Richard Nord
- Music by: Joy Ngiaw
- Production company: Fezziwig Studios
- Distributed by: Netflix
- Release date: March 17, 2022
- Running time: 90 minutes
- Country: United States
- Language: English

Rescued by Ruby is a 2022 American biographical drama film directed by Katt Shea. Based on a true story, it follows State Trooper Daniel O'Neil (Grant Gustin), who dreams of joining the K-9 search and rescue team. He is unsuccessful in doing so until he adopts and befriends a shelter dog named Ruby. The film was released on March 17, 2022, by Netflix.

== Plot ==
Ruby is an extremely active half-border collie that has been adopted seven times from the shelter she has been in over the last six months, but always later returned due to an inability to train or control her. Rhode Island state trooper Daniel O'Neil has dreamed of joining the K-9 search and rescue team. However, he has been rejected seven times, and he only has one last chance.

Daniel learns that the K-9 unit has no funds to import any more German Shepherds, the breed usually used in search and rescue teams, and therefore he would not be able to join the program. He finds out his wife, Melissa, is pregnant with their second child, making him even more determined to go for it because the promotion would also improve his pay and benefits. Pat, an advocate at the shelter, begs her workmate Rick to give Ruby a little more time. He announces that in the evening that they will put her down. Dan discovers a K-9 dog does not have to be a German Shepherd, as long as it is curious, agile, and spirited. Then he visits the shelter, and Pat convinces him to adopt Ruby to train her and join the program. The story then follows Dan's attempts to train Ruby, their failures, and their successes. They both are high-energy, enthusiastic, and have to discover how to work together effectively.

Sergeant Zarella explains that after an entry exam, those accepted do six weeks of intensive training. To enter, the dog and the owner must have the right temperament, focus, calmness, and compassion. Ruby does well until finally, impatient, she wiggles free, disturbing a bee's nest. Out of the official training, Mel reminds Dan that he got through the police academy with dyslexia and hyperactivity, so maybe he should try homeschooling Ruby.

At the exam at six weeks, Ruby passes. They wait for months on their junior team until finally they are needed. Sent to a home where a murder victim is meant to be, Ruby senses human remains, but Dan can't find them. Disappointed, he ignores her, dejected. She runs off during the night, only to have Zarella tell him the remains were found at the scene where Ruby indicated, but buried beneath concrete. Zarella tells Dan it was amazing that Ruby caught the scent, and he should have trusted his K9 partner. Dan frantically searches for Ruby, finally finding her.

Dan and Ruby join the search teams seeking Michael, a boy who got lost while hiking. They find him in the rain and dark, and the boy turns out to be Pat's son. Pat thanks Dan and Ruby and Dan is promoted to full K-9 officer.

== Cast ==
- Grant Gustin as Daniel O'Neil
- Bear as Ruby
- Scott Wolf as Sergeant Matt Zarrella
- Kaylah Zander as Melissa O'Neil
- Camille Sullivan as Pat Inman
- Tom McBeath as Seamus Brady
- Sharon Taylor as Sam
- Eileen Pedde as Sergeant Amanda Grinnell
- Jude Culham-Keays as Michael
- Giacomo Baessato as Rick McGuinness

== Production ==
In February 2021, it was announced that Grant Gustin would star in the film.

== Release ==
The film was released on Netflix on March 17, 2022.

== Reception ==
On review aggregator website Rotten Tomatoes, the film has an approval rating of 88% based on 8 reviews, with an average rating of 6.9/10.

On the week from 21 to 28 of March, the film had 311 million viewing minutes, ranking fourth on Nielsen's top movie chart of that week, and it placed second on Netflix's Top 10 English-language films.
