= R.S.V.P. (1984 film) =

- Genre: Comedy
- Written by: Joel Bender; Larue Watts
- Directed by: Lem Amero
- Starring: Adam Mills; Lynda Wiesmeier; Veronica Hart; Ray Colbert; Harry Reems
- Music by: Ian Shaw
- Country of origin: United States
- Original language: English

Production
- Executive producer: Chuck Vincent
- Producer: Lem Amero
- Production location: Los Angeles
- Cinematography: Larry Revene
- Running time: 87 minutes
- Production company: Chuck Vincent Production

Original release
- Release: December 1984

R.S.V.P. is a 1984 American television film starring Harry Reems and Veronica Hart. It features future director Katt Shea in a small role.
