= The Terror Within =

1989 American science fiction/horror film

- VHS cover
- Directed by: Thierry Notz
- Written by: Thomas M. Cleaver
- Produced by: Roger Corman
- Starring: George Kennedy; Andrew Stevens; Starr Andreeff; Terri Treas
- Cinematography: Rohn Schmidt
- Edited by: Brent Schoenfeld
- Music by: Rick Conrad
- Distributed by: Concorde Pictures
- Release date: March 13, 1989
- Running time: 90 minutes
- Country: United States
- Language: English
- Box office: $858,591

The Terror Within is a 1989 American science fiction horror film directed by Thierry Notz and starring George Kennedy, Andrew Stevens, Starr Andreeff and Terri Treas. It was followed by a sequel in 1991, The Terror Within II, with Stevens reprising his starring role while also handling the film's writing and directing duties.

== Plot ==
In a post-apocalyptic future, human survivors are fighting a group of mutant monsters they refer to as "gargoyles".

Two of these survivors Michael and John are out surveying the world after a chemical or biological attack which left a large portion of the population mutated or dead. The survivors are part of the Mojave Lab and have lost contact with their sister Rocky Mountain Lab.

Over the radio, their colleagues, Hal, Andre, Neil, Sue, Linda and David hear John and Michael fall under attack from the gargoyles while investigating a large group of buzzards. In order to find John and Michael, David and Sue go out of the bunker, only to find John and Michael dead. They also find an injured girl named Karen who they bring back to their bunker.

David and Sue learn that Karen is the last remaining member of a group of survivors who were attempting to seek asylum at the Rocky Mountain Lab. Complications arise when the scientists discover that Karen is pregnant. Karen then explains that she was recently raped by a gargoyle. Linda and David explains to Karen that the gargoyles reproduce by raping human women and impregnating them. They tell Karen that she is most likely pregnant with a gargoyle's offspring.

The group of scientists debate on whether to abort the fetus inside of Karen. The scientist wish to perform an abortion as gargoyles have a shorter gestation period and they are afraid of a gargoyle rampage. Karen expresses reluctance as she was sexually active with her deceased boyfriend and thinks that the fetus could have been fathered by him instead. The scientists' dilemma concerning the handling of Karen's pregnancy is further complicated when Karen suddenly goes into labor. They decide to give anesthesia to Karen while attempting to come up with a plan to handle her soon to be born gargoyle offspring.

Karen gives birth to a gargoyle (and losing her life in the process) which gets loose in the bunker. Hal develops a failed plan to kill the mutant which leads to the death of himself, Andre and Neil at the gargoyle. The gargoyle then proceeds to wound David and injure his dog Butch, while also kidnapping Sue with the intentions to reproducing with her. Sue is successfully impregnated by the gargoyle, and she later accidentally kills herself while trying to abort the fetus herself.

Linda and David find out that the gargoyles are vulnerable to high-pitched frequency after the gargoyle retreats when David accidentally blows a dog whistle in his possession.

The duo then hatch a plan to kill the gargoyle using David's dog whistle to manipulate the gargoyle's movements. The two surviving humans are able to lure the gargoyle into the ventilation system, where he becomes trapped and falls into a running exhaust fan, dismembering him.

David and Linda re-establishes radio contact with the Rocky Mountain Lab and along with a healed Butch leave the bunker with a high frequency megaphone to brave the outside world. Before leaving, they lie in wait for a number of gargoyles to enter the open bunker and implode it with remote controlled explosives.

== Cast ==
- George Kennedy as Hal
- Andrew Stevens as David
- Starr Andreeff as Sue
- Terri Treas as Linda
- John LaFayette as Andre
- Tommy Hinkley as Neil
- Yvonne Saa as Karen
- Joseph Hardin as Michael
- Al Guarino as John
- Roren Sumner as Gargoyle
- Joal Corso as Gargoyle #2
- Butch Stevens as Butch

== Production ==
The movie launched a long-running collaboration between Corman and Andy Stevens.

== Release ==
The Terror Within was given a limited release theatrically in the United States by Concorde Pictures in January 1989. It grossed $858,591 at the box office. The film was released on VHS the same year by MGM Home Entertainment. In 2010, Shout! Factory released the film on DVD, packaged as a double feature with Dead Space, as part of the Roger Corman's Cult Classics collection.

During a screening of the film in Austin, Texas, a teenager brought a gun to the theater and shot her friend in the head as an April Fools' Day joke.

== Critical response ==
Joe Bob Briggs called The Terror Within "a pretty decent new flick ... . This movie should be required viewing for every member of the Supreme Court. We're talking 17 dead bodies. No breasts. Snake-eating. Bloody fetus monster. Multiple throat-slashing. Giant gargoyle rape. One self-abortion. Exploding sheds. Exploding gargoyles. Gratuitous monster abortion scene, the best one since It's Alive. Buzzard Fu. Crossbow Fu."

The Los Angeles Times said the film "comes out emphatically in support of a woman's right to terminate a pregnancy, if not in all instances, at least in cases of rape by a gooey 9-foot-tall mutant ... the only way to enjoy this [film] ... is to savor star George Kennedy's badly synced post-production dialogue and think back to his role in the sci-fi cheapie movie-within-the-movie in Albert Brooks' Modern Romance, which was full of hilarious bits about the perils of film dubbing. Nine years later, thanks to producer Roger Corman, Kennedy really is in that movie."

Variety called it "no frills" and "lacks freshness".

== See also ==
- Reproduction and pregnancy in speculative fiction
