= Purple Haze (film) =

- British theatrical release poster
- Directed by: David Burton Morris
- Written by: David Burton Morris; Victoria Wozniak
- Produced by: Thomas A. Fucci (producer) (as Thomas Anthony Fucci)
- Starring: Peter Nelson; Chuck McQuary; Bernard Baldan; Susanna Lack; Bob Breuler
- Cinematography: Richard Gibb
- Edited by: Dusty Dennison
- Production company: Triumph Films
- Distributed by: Purple Haze
- Release date: October 1982
- Running time: 97 minutes
- Country: United States
- Language: English

Purple Haze is a 1982 dramedy film about Matt Caulfield, a college student who is expelled for smoking cannabis and is subsequently drafted to serve in the Vietnam War in the summer of 1968.

== Background ==
David Burton Morris said Purple Haze was inspired by growing conservative sentiment during the Reagan presidency and young people's fears that the US would enter into another war. He told the Walker Art Center that his intent was to warn people about "more undeclared wars" and "to stop believing in our leaders, to not take what they say at face value, but to do research, to seek the truth." The film was produced on a low budget and cast with non-SAG actors; Morris recalled putting out a call for people in "hippie" clothing.

Purple Haze is named after The Jimi Hendrix Experience's song "Purple Haze," which appears in the film. Matt Caulfield's name is a reference to Holden Caulfield from J. D. Salinger's The Catcher in the Rye. This caused some critics to interpret the film as an update of Salinger's novel, though Morris denied that was his intent. Some elements of the story are autographical; Morris told the St. Paul Pioneer Press that like Caulfield, he had been "kicked out of" college, that he and his friends hung out around the Ford Bridge like the characters in the movie do, and that the character of Caulfield's father was based on his own father.

== Plot summary ==
The film opens at Princeton University, 1968, where Matt Caulfield and his friends are watching television. There, they witness President Lyndon B. Johnson state his plans not to rerun in the upcoming election. Upon hearing of his plans, Matt and the rest of the students celebrate by smoking marijuana. An "uncool" student from next door is disturbed by the boys' racket, and upon being pelted with junk food by the boys for telling them to be quiet, he calls the police. Within minutes, Matt and his roommates are caught smoking and are banned from college campus. Matt returns home to his family, where he is faced with various issues before being shipped off to Vietnam.

== Reception ==
Purple Haze received reviews in some mainstream publications including The New York Times, which panned it. The film won awards including the Grand Jury prize at Sundance Film Festival in 1983, where it was championed by judge Roger Ebert. Though Purple Haze faded into obscurity shortly after, it has since been called a "cult classic."

== Soundtrack ==
Purple Haze featured many pieces of music, mainly period rock tracks from the mid- to late 1960s.

- "When I Was Young" by the Animals
- "For What It's Worth" by Buffalo Springfield
- "Expecting to Fly" by Buffalo Springfield
- "I Feel Free" by Cream
- "So You Want to Be a Rock 'n' Roll Star" by the Byrds
- "I-Feel-Like-I'm-Fixin'-to-Die Rag" by Country Joe and the Fish
- "Eight Miles High" by the Byrds
- "Magic Carpet Ride" by Steppenwolf
- "White Rabbit" by Jefferson Airplane
- "Embryonic Journey" by Jefferson Airplane
- "A Whiter Shade of Pale" by Procol Harum
- "A Salty Dog" by Procol Harum
- "Runaway" by Del Shannon
- "Everyday People" by Sly and the Family Stone
- "Darkness, Darkness" by the Youngbloods
- "Get Together" by the Youngbloods
- "Purple Haze" by the Jimi Hendrix Experience
- "Foxy Lady" by the Jimi Hendrix Experience
- "Are You Experienced?" by the Jimi Hendrix Experience
- "The Star-Spangled Banner" by the Jimi Hendrix Experience
