= Circuitry Man =

- Directed by: Steven Lovy
- Written by: Steven Lovy; Robert Lovy
- Produced by: Steven Reich; John Schouweiler
- Starring: Jim Metzler; Dana Wheeler-Nicholson; Lu Leonard; Vernon Wells; Barbara Alyn Woods; Dennis Christopher
- Cinematography: Jamie Thompson
- Edited by: Gregory Neri; Jonas Thaler
- Music by: Deborah Holland
- Production companies: IRS Media; Synthetic Productions
- Distributed by: Skouras Pictures
- Release dates: May 25, 1990; (Seattle International Film Festival); October 31, 1990
- Running time: 93 minutes
- Country: United States
- Language: English

Circuitry Man is a 1990 American post apocalyptic science fiction film directed by Steven Lovy and starring Jim Metzler, Dana Wheeler-Nicholson and Vernon Wells. It was followed by a sequel, Plughead Rewired: Circuitry Man II, in 1994.

== Synopsis ==
In post-apocalyptic 2020, pollution has killed off the natural world and the population is forced to live underground. A woman attempts to smuggle a suitcase of contraband drug/chips from Los Angeles to the underground remnants of New York City, while eluding both police and gangsters. Along the way, she is aided by a romantic bio-mechanical pony-tailed android and pursued by Plughead, a villain with the ability to tap into people's minds.

== Cast ==
- Jim Metzler as Danner
- Dana Wheeler-Nicholson as Lori
- Lu Leonard as Juice
- Vernon Wells as Plughead
- Barbara Alyn Woods as Yoyo
- Dennis Christopher as Leech
- Steven Bottomley as Bartender
- Barney Burman as Cheater
- Andy Goldberg as Squid
- Garry Goodrow as Jugs
- Darren Lott as Jackie

== Production ==
Circuitry Man was adapted from a student film Steven Lovy made while attending UCLA. Shooting began in July 1989 and took place in Los Angeles and Antelope Valley, California.

== Reception ==
Kevin Thomas of the Los Angeles Times called it "nothing if not derivative" but "consistently distinctive and funny". In The Psychotronic Video Guide, Michael Weldon described it as "a clever, sometimes funny, well-made science fiction adventure" that is more fun than Hardware or Total Recall, two science fiction films that were also released in 1990. Tech Noir author Paul Meehan, discussing film noir in science fiction, wrote that the film attempts to overcome its low budget with gratuitous violence but called Wells "memorably nasty".
