= Peter Nelson (actor) =

American actor (born 1959)

- Born: September 10, 1959 (age 65); Los Angeles, California
- Occupation(s): Film, television actor

Peter Nelson (born September 10, 1959) (sometimes credited as Calvin Persson) is an American actor, producer, and writer. He is perhaps best known for his role as the evil visitor youth leader Brian in the 1983 NBC miniseries V and the 1984 sequel, V: The Final Battle.

His film credits range include Purple Haze (1983), The Last Starfighter (1984), The Expendables (1989), Crime Zone (1989), Sounds of Silence (1989), Silk 2 (1989), Curfew (1989), Last Stand at Lang Mei (1989), and Die Hard 2 (1990), Final Vendetta (1996) and Double Team (1997). In 2001 he appeared in the film Delivering Milo. His most recent film appearance was in the Syfy movie Sharktopus as Commander Cox (credited under his alternate name Calvin Persson). Nelson has made guest appearances on TV shows such as The Facts of Life, Miami Vice and Kindred: The Embraced.

== Filmography ==
=== Actor ===
==== Film ====
Year	Title	Role	Notes
1982	Purple Haze	Matt Caulfield	
1984	The Last Starfighter	Jack Blake	
1988	The Expendables	Sterling	
1988	Crime Zone	'Bone'	
1989	Sounds of Silence	Peter Mitchell	
1989	Curfew	John	
1989	Silk 2	Tony	
1989	Last Stand at Lang Mei	Captain Wheeler	
1990	Die Hard 2	Thompson	
1996	Sweet Evil	Larry	
1997	Double Team	CIA Agent	
1998	Knock Off	Biff	
2001	Delivering Milo	Reporter	
2021	The Apprentice	Museum Curator	

==== Television ====
Year	Title	Role	Notes
1983	V	Brian	2 episodes
1983	The Facts of Life	William Ogden Smith IV	Episode: "Just My Bill"
1984	Newhart	Marshall Coleman	Episode: "Kirk Pops the Question"
1984	Celebrity	Jeffie Crawford	2 episodes
1984	V The Final Battle	Brian	3 episodes
1985	Space	Millard Mott	3 episodes
1985–1986	The Paper Chase	Tom Ford	17 episodes
1986	Dress Gray	Barnes	2 episodes
1987	Eight Is Enough: A Family Reunion	Mark	Television film
1989	Miami Vice	Dan Shaw	Episode: "Miami Squeeze"
1989	An Eight Is Enough Wedding	Mark	Television film
1996	Kindred: The Embraced	Doctor	Episode: "Romeo and Juliet"
2010	Sharktopus	Commander Cox	Television film
2014–2016	TripTank	Karl / Ryan / Barista Ben	8 episodes; also creator, composer, and writer
2017	Man Seeking Woman	Mark	Episode: "Blood"
2020	The Boys	Maeve's Dad	Episode: "Over the Hill with the Swords of a Thousand Men"

=== Producer ===
Year	Title	Notes
1992	The Harvest	Associate producer
1997	Double Team	Associate producer; uncredited
1998	Knock Off	Associate producer
1999	Simon Sez	Associate producer
2001	Metropolis	Executive producer
2008	The Shepherd: Border Patrol	Associate producer
2020	The Postcard Killings	Producer
2020	Middleton Christmas	Executive producer
