= Bloodfist II =

1990 film directed by Andy Blumenthal

- DVD cover
- Directed by: Andy Blumenthal
- Written by: Catherine Cyran
- Produced by: Roger Corman; Catherine Cyran; Cirio H. Santiago
- Starring: Don Wilson; Maurice Smith; James Warring; Timothy Baker; Richard Hill
- Cinematography: Bruce Dorfman
- Edited by: Karen D. Joseph
- Music by: Nigel Holton
- Production companies: Hollywood Road Films; New Horizons
- Distributed by: Concorde Pictures
- Release date: October 12, 1990
- Running time: 85 minutes
- Country: United States
- Language: English
- Box office: $1,292,323

Bloodfist II is a 1990 American martial arts action film directed by Andy Blumenthal and starring Don "The Dragon" Wilson, Kris Aguilar, and Ronald Asinas. It was written by Catherine Cyran. A sequel to Bloodfist (1989), it is the second installment in the Bloodfist film series.

== Plot ==
The film opens with kickboxer Jake Raye fighting Mickey Sheehan for the Lightweight Championship. Jake kicks Mickey in the throat, instantly killing him. Jake decides to give up kickboxing.

A year later, friend and manager Vinny Petrello (Maurice Smith) asks him to travel to Manila and bail him out of trouble with a guy named Su. Jake Raye travels to Manila, and meets up with local fighters John Jones (James Warring), Sal Taylor (Timothy D. Baker), Manny Rivera (Manny Samson), and Tobo Casenerra (Monsour Del Rosario). He also meets up with Dieter (Robert Marius), the head of the Dojo. Dieter drugs Raye and puts him on a ship with the other fighters. Raye is reacquainted with his friend Bobby Rose (Richard Hill) and meets another fighter named Ernesto (Steve Rogers). Su (Joe Mari Avellana) is the one bringing fighters to his island home called Paradise, and Vinny is helping him.

The fighters briefly revolt giving Jake Raye time to escape, but he has a change of heart and decides to free the other fighters. He makes it back undetected by Su. Jake takes out some guards before Dieter discovers him and Vinny knocks him out. Jake is taken to the challenger’s box of the arena, where Su, Vinny, and his guests are awaiting the match's beginning. Both John and Ernest die in the arena while battling their opponents while Manny is killed trying to escape. Ernest wins his fight, but Su orders Vinny to kill him. Jake fights and kills Vinny while the others defeat the guards and the elite fighters. Bobby shoots Dieter, and the film ends with Jake kicking Su with off a balcony.

== Cast ==
- Don "The Dragon" Wilson as Jake Raye
- Rina Reyes as Mariella
- Jose Mari Avellana as Su
- Robert Marius as Dieter
- Maurice Smith as Vinny Petrello
- Timothy D. Baker as Sal Taylor
- James Warring as John Jones

== Release ==
Bloodfist II received a limited release theatrically from Concorde Films in October 1990. It grossed $1,292,323 at the box office.

New Concorde Home Entertainment released the film on DVD in 2000 along with Bloodfist, Bloodfist III: Forced to Fight, and Bloodfist IV: Die Trying. The DVD is currently out-of-print.
