= Bloodfist =

- Theatrical release poster
- Directed by: Terence H. Winkless
- Written by: Robert King
- Produced by: Roger Corman; Sally Mattison
- Starring: Don "The Dragon" Wilson; Rob Kaman; Billy Blanks; Cris Aguilar
- Cinematography: Ricardo Jacques Gale
- Edited by: Karen Horn
- Music by: Sasha Matson
- Production company: Concorde–New Horizons
- Distributed by: Concorde Pictures
- Release date: September 22, 1989
- Running time: 85 minutes
- Country: United States
- Language: English
- Budget: $200,000–300,000
- Box office: $1.7 million (U.S.)

Bloodfist is a 1989 American martial arts film directed by Terence H. Winkless, starring Don "The Dragon" Wilson in his first feature starring role, Rob Kaman, Billy Blanks and Cris Aguilar. The plot sees an American former kickboxer travel to Manila, where he re-enters competition to avenge the murder of his brother and fellow fighter.

The film adds a whodunnit element to the template established by previous tournament fighting films, especially the then-recent Bloodsport. While negatively received, it generated record profits for Concorde Pictures, and kickstarted a long-running franchise of increasingly unrelated sequels and spinoffs. To bolster its credibility, Bloodfist listed the real-life martial arts credentials of its stars, not only on the poster but in the credits as well, a gimmick that carried over to other Concorde films and was copied by some competitors. It is the first installment in the Bloodfist film series.

== Plot ==
A man who loses a rigged fight kills his opponent and is announced as the winner. On his way back home, another man kills him.

In the United States, retired boxer Jake Raye and co-owner of Hal and Jake's self-defense class receives a call from the Philippines police department. He is told his half-brother Michael is dead, and he must pick up the body in Manila. Raye decides to stay there and find his brother's killer himself. Raye gets training help from a man named Kwong, who tells Raye that his brother's killer will likely be at a gladiatorial competition known as the Ta-Chang, or Red Fist tournament, where only the winner comes out alive.

Kwong trains Raye for the tournament. He wins all the fights and proceeds to the final match with Chin Woo. Kwong tells him that Chin Woo is his brother's killer. Hal, who has come to watch Raye's final bout, informs Raye that Kwong is the real killer. Raye defeats Woo and sets off after Kwong. They fight in the same alley where Michael died. Raye is badly wounded but impales Kwong on a fence. Raye walks off into the night.

== Cast ==
- Don "The Dragon" Wilson as Jake Raye
- Rob Kaman as Raton
- Billy Blanks as Black Rose
- Cris Aguilar as Chin Woo
- Joe Mari Avellana as Kwong
- Michael Shaner as "Baby" Davies
- Riley Bowman as Nancy
- Marilyn Bautista as Angela
- Kenneth Peerless as Hal
- Félix Pascual as Beggar Lee
- Ned Hourani as Michael Raye
- Edgardo Castañeda as Tung Pin

== Production ==
=== Development and writing ===
The worldwide success of 1988's Bloodsport generated a resurgence in martial arts films. Bloodfist was exploitation mogul Roger Corman's entry into the genre. To find his next star, the producer instructed his staff to survey martial arts publications' fighter rankings, where the name of Don "The Dragon" Wilson came up. Corman left a message on one Don Wilson's answering machine that said "Hi, my name is Roger Corman. If you're the Don Wilson that's the kickboxing champ, I'd like you to come in and read for my film." Wilson had no idea who Corman was, but he did and after only reciting a handful of lines, the producer informed him he was hired. Wilson's contract was initially for two pictures, and stipulated that he would work on the first for a weekly salary of $1000 or $1200, depending on sources. However, another article says Wilson made between $80,000 and 90,000 from the film. According to Jean-Claude Van Damme, Corman tried to sign him after Bloodsport, but he felt that Concorde productions were not up to his standards.

Although he had no directorial experience in the genre, Terence H. Winkless had co-written a script for Roger Corman's brother Gene in the 1970s, in which kickboxer Joe Lewis would have played a cyborg engineered by Chinese radicals to kill a Nixon-like U.S. president during a martial arts demonstration. That film was cancelled due to Lewis' other commitments. Winkless was offered the directing job on Bloodfist after other Corman prospects bailed on him, and was given just one day to sign on. Upon learning that it would be shot in the Philippines, he consulted with fellow Concorde director Carl Franklin, who had already worked there. Franklin warned him that it would be tough, but encouraged him to go. The film was originally set in Hong Kong, and Robert King's screenplay went barely untouched after its original draft. Even though Winkless was due to leave for Manilla just ten days after being introduced to the project, the script he received still mentioned Hong Kong locations, including a scene where the hero climbed a long flight of stairs to a mountain temple.

While Billy Blanks did possess the requisite martial arts credentials, his casting was coincidental. He was the bodyguard to actress Catherine Bach, who had been contracted for a film in the Philippines. At their hotel's disco, Blanks struck a conversation with Winkless, who informed him that he was in town to direct a martial arts film and still had one fighter left to cast. Blanks landed the role on the spot, much to his excitement, and promptly made arrangements to free himself of his remaining obligations. According to the director, Blanks harbored doubts as to whether the job was real until the moment he walked onto the set.

=== Filming ===
Don Wilson departed the U.S. for Manila on November 7, 1988. The principal actors were only available for about twenty days, however filming lasted thirty-two days in total, which was longer than average by Corman's standards.

The schedule allowed Winkless time to sort out some issues, such as replacing the Hong Kong mountain temple from the original script with the Taal Volcano, which Wilson is seen climbing in the final version. However, the helicopter required for aerial photography of the actor's ascent was only available for about one hour. The shoot was generally difficult, due to low-quality gear and limited communication with his Filipino peers. The crew was on a six-day week, as with most U.S. productions shot in developing countries, but worked shorter days than those in Los Angeles. The director's request to have cameras equipped with crystal sync motors, which were needed to offset the limitations of HMI lights, was initially approved, but the equipment was never provided, leading to visible flicker in late arena scenes. Some cameras dated back to local producer Cirio Santiago's father, most notably a Mitchell from 1946. Its outdated viewfinder prevented him from seeing exactly what was being captured, and it was so unwieldy that a "camera lifter" received mention in the credits for carrying it. Winkless vowed to never again work in the Philippines after that experience.

=== Post-production ===
Roger Corman was a mostly hands-off producer, but he did show up in the editing booth and suggested a few changes. Even though they were often limited to trimming a few frames, Winkless found that they all improved the scene, which was a testament to Corman's experience. The late-blooming director, who was still learning the tricks of the trade, found how to piece together several smaller locations into a larger on-screen locale by masking cuts with vegetation.

While contemporary publications pegged the budget at $1,000,000, Wilson said he had been told by Winkless that the film may have actually been made for under $200,000. In another interview, Wilson quoted the budget as $250,000. Other sources put the film's cost at closer to $300,000.

== Release ==
=== Challenge to Jean-Claude Van Damme ===
To hype Bloodfist's release, Concorde printed a disparaging quote from World Kickboxing Association president Howard Hanson—whose light heavyweight title was held by Wilson—on the film's poster, reading "Don Wilson would kick Van Damme's a-- in one round!" Corman also challenged the Belgian to a fight with Wilson for $100,000. Wilson conceded that this was a publicity stunt orchestrated by his producer, but nonetheless accused Van Damme of misrepresenting himself as a former world champion, and asserted that the Belgian would be no match for him in real life. According to Wilson, Van Damme jokingly replied that instead of fighting him, he would rather settle the score with Corman himself. In a retort published in Black Belt magazine, Van Damme scoffed at the low purse in comparison to what he stood to make on his upcoming films, and argued that the challenge was unfair as he had stopped competing in 1980 to focus on his cinematic pursuits.

=== Theatrical ===
Bloodfist was originally intended for release in June 1989, but Concorde had problems securing theater bookings due to an oversaturation of blockbusters such as Indiana Jones and the Last Crusade, Ghostbusters II and Batman, so the film was delayed by a few months.

For its U.S. release, Bloodfist used a touring regional release model, debuting on 54 screens in the Southeast on September 22, 1989, and later expanding to 77 screens as it reached major markets. The film maintained a respectable per-screen average of around $2500 for several weekends, and went on to gross $1,770,082 domestically.

=== Home video ===
The film was released on home video through MGM/UA Home Video, with whom Concorde had a distribution deal at the time, on February 20, 1990. According to early 1990s press, the film shipped some 80,000 units and generated total revenue of $11 million. Wilson himself quoted more conservative figures of 60,000 to 70,000 tapes sold, and about $10,000,000 in overall revenue.

New Concorde Home Entertainment released Bloodfist on DVD, along with its first three sequels, on May 30, 2000. The DVD is currently out-of-print. The film was re-issued on Blu-ray by Shout! Factory on December 20, 2022.

== Reception ==
Bloodfist has received predominantly negative reviews. In a contemporary piece, the New York Daily News unfavorably compared the film to Jean-Claude Van Damme's then-current output, writing that "Blood Fist [sic] limps through increasingly predictable paces sans so much as a soupçon of the mindless charm of Kickboxer. And while real-life chopsocky champ Don Wilson may be capable of kicking 'Van Damme's a-- in one round' (as one of the pic's bloodthirsty blurbs contends), he lacks Jean-Claude's clumsy but genuine charisma." The Variety reviewer credited as Lor. also noted the "formula script, utilizing virtually the same premise as [the] recent Van Damme vehicle Kickboxer". He conceded that the picture "has a couple of plot twists plus a statuesque blonde leading lady (Riley Bowman) to distinguish it from others in the genre. Unfortunately, the editing is ragged and photography hit-and-miss, while the fighters-turned thesps show little acting ability."

TV Guide was similarly dismissive, pointing to "the screenplay being recycled from at least five other kung fu films", and "further hampered by bad acting and obvious budget restraints." AllMovie rated the film a two on a scale of zero to five. VideoHound's Golden Movie Retriever, a Thomson Gale reference book, rated it a two on a scale of zero to four. However, VideoHound's Complete Guide to Cult Flicks and Trash Pics, an exploitation-centric spinoff of the prior publication, rated it a three, finding that "the killer is not easy to spot until the final reel" and "on a purely visceral level the film delivers, though it will remain strictly viewing for the martial arts fan."

== Legacy ==
Bill Wallace wrote in Black Belt that "maybe it wasn't the best karate film in the world, but at least people could see what different martial artists look like doing their fight scenes." Bloodfist kickstarted the career of Don Wilson, who became a staple of the independent action film market in the 1990s. Co-star Billy Blanks also graduated to leading roles within a few years, most notably for Shapiro-Glickenhaus Entertainment.

The film received a direct sequel the next year, Bloodfist II, where Wilson reprised his role as Jake Raye. After that, Bloodfist became a brand name used by Concorde for a number of unrelated action vehicles starring Don "The Dragon" Wilson. Those were branded as Bloodfist in some markets but not in others. The original film's storyline was also re-used in two spinoffs, the female-fronted Angelfist (1993) and the futuristic Bloodfist 2050 (2005).

In addition, the Bloodfist premise became the go-to for Concorde martial arts vehicles. It was re-used two more times in 1993 alone, for the company debuts of Jerry Trimble in Full Contact and Dominic Labanca in Dragon Fire, although these films were not marketed as official remakes.
