= Carnosaur 3: Primal Species =

- U.K. DVD cover
- Directed by: Jonathan Winfrey
- Screenplay by: Scott Sandin
- Story by: Rob Kerchner
- Produced by: Roger Corman
- Starring: Scott Valentine; Janet Gunn; Rick Dean; Rodger Halston; Anthony Peck
- Cinematography: Andrea V. Rossotto
- Edited by: Louis Cioffi
- Music by: Kevin Kiner
- Production company: New Horizons
- Release date: November 5, 1996
- Running time: 80 minutes
- Country: United States
- Language: English

Carnosaur 3: Primal Species is a 1996 direct-to-video science fiction horror film. It is the sequel to the 1995 film Carnosaur 2, and is the final installment of the Carnosaur trilogy. It stars Scott Valentine, Janet Gunn, Rick Dean, Rodger Halston and Anthony Peck. The film follows a military team as they try to capture several genetically reconstructed dinosaurs. It received negative reviews.

It was remade as Scorpius Gigantus.

== Plot ==
An army convoy is attacked by terrorists who think that they are stealing uranium. But they soon discover that they stole a truckload of living frozen biological material instead of uranium. Once in a dockside warehouse, two frozen Velociraptors and a Tyrannosaurus rex escape and kill terrorists before the police arrive, expecting to find drug dealers. After finding the sole survivor, the police are killed inside the warehouse by the dinosaurs. A special counter-terrorism force led by Colonel Rance Higgins is called in by General Mercer where they find body parts and a refrigerated truck rather than uranium. They maneuver through the warehouse boxes until two of them are killed.

The survivors learn from Dr. Hodges that these dinosaurs have been genetically rebuilt and are now the last three "carnosaurs" still in existence. The dinosaurs were on their way to a government research facility, and it is clearly stated that they must be captured alive, due to the potential to cure major diseases. A huge shipment of meat is on the dock, so the three remaining soldiers hunt in this area, encountering a unit of Marine who have come as reinforcements. Private Polchek is given tranquilizer to shoot the dinosaurs while the group sets up a decoy and net trap with meat. One of the Velociraptor attacks and almost succeeds in dragging Polchek away, but is shot down.

The raptor is taken to the base for examination. Hodges soon theorizes the regeneration of Velociraptor and asexual reproduction of T. rex. Once recovered, the injured Velociraptor wakes up and begins to attack. The T. rex also appears and kills a soldier before escaping with the Velociraptor to an agricultural transport ship. With Marines member Rossi as captain, the team decides to move the ship out to sea and use its coolant to freeze the dinosaurs.

When it comes time to explore the lower decks of the ship, the raptors kill a few more soldiers. The survivors make it to an elevator, but a Velociraptor gnaws through the cable and they crash on the lower level. There, the team discovers a nest of eggs and begins to shoot it, angering T. rex, who kills Polchek. The survivors eventually decide to kill the dinosaurs by blowing up the ship with dynamite.

The T. rex bursts through the ceiling and drags Rossi through before killing him. The two Velociraptors are shot after one of them kills Marine member Proudfoot. Hodges feels the T. rex is near. She and Rance hide behind lockers that the T. rex headbutts. Rance throws an explosive into the dinosaur's mouth, killing it. The two race against time to jump into the ocean before the ship explodes. Back in a police cruiser at the port, the lone surviving terrorist is still bound and gagged in the back seat when a Velociraptor soon appears outside the vehicle and attacks him.

== Cast ==
- Scott Valentine as Colonel Rance Higgins
- Janet Gunn as Dr. Hodges
- Rick Dean as Polchek
- Rodger Halston as Sanders
- Anthony Peck as General Pete Mercer
- Terri J. Vaughn as B.T. Coolidge
- Billy Burnette as Lieutenant Furguson
- Morgan Englund as Rossi
- Stephen Lee as Sergeant
- David Roberson as Johnson
- Justina Vail as Proudfoot
- Cyril O'Reilly as Dolan
- Abraham Gordon as Officer Billings
- Michael James McDonald as Officer Wilson
- Jonathan Winfrey as Bob

== Production and release ==
Carnosaur 3: Primal Species was made on a smaller budget than its predecessors. A 60-pound rubber creature suit was utilized to portray some of the dinosaurs. Cast member Justina Vail said about the production: "A lot of it made me laugh. It looked like there was a guy in a dinosaur costume running across the room. So it was a challenge to get to the real reality part of it, but ultimately it was a blast". The cast includes actor Rick Dean, who had previously played a different character in Carnosaur 2. Roger Corman's longtime story editor Frances Doel said that when they were thinking of new ways to approach the Carnosaur series with the third installment, the idea was to make the monster similar to Grendel from Beowulf.

The film premiered on video in November 5, 1996. It was released on DVD on April 18, 2000.

== Reception ==
Fangoria was critical of the film and stated that it was lacking in "originality, taste, logic" and realism, but wrote about the dinosaurs: "Seen in quick cuts or by the light of flickering bulbs, the Carnosaurs themselves are still somewhat effective; in fact, they're the only good thing in Carnosaur 3". Randy Myers, writing for Knight-Ridder Newspapers, was critical of the dinosaur effects and the casting of Valentine in the lead role. J.R. Taylor of Entertainment Weekly rated it a "D" and wrote that "the rambling story doesn't show half the wit of the closing credits, in which a disclaimer assures that no dinosaurs were harmed during the making of this film".

TV Guide wrote that director Jonathan Winfrey "does demonstrate some aptitude for creative camerawork and editing transitions", but still called the film a "slack, unscary exercise", rating it one star out of four. TV Guide was critical of the script, the dinosaur effects, and the "one-dimensional" characters and acting. Brian J. Dillard of AllMovie found the film to be boring and repetitive, rating it one and a half stars out of five. Dillard wrote that the film reduced the Carnosaur series to "its most basic elements -- interchangeable soldiers being chased by interchangeable rubber dinosaurs".

Riley Black, writing for Smithsonian in 2009, included Carnosaur 3 on her list of the five worst dinosaur films ever made. Regarding the premise of dinosaurs against the military, Black wrote that the filmmakers "somehow managed to make it boring". Critic Mike Mayo wrote in 2013: "Even though the setting is your basic empty-warehouse industrial park, the whole film is arguably no sillier or more poorly plotted than Jurassic Park: The Lost World, but with much less impressive effects".

== See also ==
- List of films featuring dinosaurs
