= Scorpius Gigantus =

- Directed by: Tommy Withrow
- Written by: Terence H. Winkless; Raly Radouloff
- Produced by: executive Roger Corman
- Starring: Jeff Fahey
- Production company: Concorde-New Horizons
- Release date: 2006
- Running time: 91 minutes
- Country: United States
- Language: English

Scorpius Gigantus is a 2006 American science-fiction film from producer Roger Corman directed by Tommy Withrow. It is a remake of Carnosaur 3.

Reel Film called it "an effort that's pretty much a wash on every level, and it hardly seems likely that Roger Corman himself would be able to muster up a convincing recommendation."

Dread Central said the film "doesn’t bring anything new to the formula, nor does it even aspire to do so. That would be acceptable if it at least did a good job being a retread. It doesn’t."

== Plot ==
A geneticist seeks to make a name for herself by saving the planet from diseases by using eons-old antibodies, harvested from enlarged six legged creatures. The creatures don't like being big and escape. Now a Delta Force team must contain this threat before it's too late.

== Cast ==
- Jeff Fahey as Major Nick Reynolds
- Jo Bourne-Taylor as Dr. Jane Preston
- Hristo Mitzkov as Lieutenant Yager
- Evgenia Vasileva as Specialist Dokic
- Jonas Talkington as Burke
- Stefan Ivanov as Klotchkov
- Dejan Angelov as Timov
- Ray Hartbarger as General Miller
- Nencho Balabanov as Captain Ivan Novak
- George Angelov as Captain Velchevski
