= Starr Andreeff =

Canadian actress

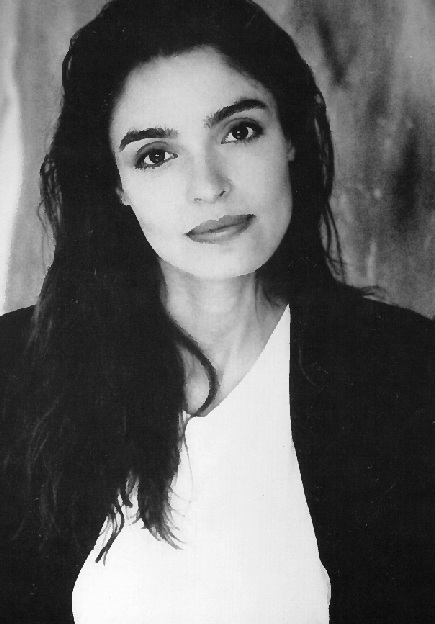
- Andreeff in 2012
- Born: Hamilton, Ontario, Canada

Starr Andreeff is a Canadian producer and former actress from Hamilton, Ontario. She was Miss Teen Hamilton and a semi-finalist in the 1980 Miss Teen Canada pageant. She is best known for her roles in B-movies such as Dance of the Damned, Nightfall, The Terror Within, Out of the Dark, and Amityville Dollhouse. Andreeff appeared as lawyer Jessica Holmes on General Hospital and as Sabrina Cross on Falcon Crest. She also appeared as a guest star on The Golden Girls (S3E2), The Facts of Life, Mike Hammer, Private Eye, and TekWar.

She created, produced, and starred in the 2014 four-part series Child Star, which aired on Slice Network in Canada.
