= Hour of the Assassin =

1987 US-Peru action-drama film by Luis Llosa

- Theatrical poster
- Directed by: Luis Llosa Urquidi
- Written by: Matt Leipzig
- Produced by: Roger Corman (Executive producer); Mary Ann Fisher (Associate producer); Luis Llosa Urquidi (Producer); Rolando Ore (Associate producer); Fernando Vasquez de Velasco (Associate producer)
- Starring: Erik Estrada; Robert Vaughn; Alfredo Álvarez Calderón; Orlando Sacha; Reynaldo Arenas; Lourdes Berninzon
- Cinematography: Cusi Barrio
- Edited by: William Flicker
- Music by: Fred Myrow
- Production company: Iguana Productions
- Distributed by: Concorde Pictures
- Release date: January 23, 1987
- Running time: 96 minutes
- Countries: United States; Peru
- Language: English

Hour of the Assassin (also known as Spanish: Misión en los Andes) is a 1987 action–drama film starring Erik Estrada, Robert Vaughn, Alfredo Álvarez Calderón, Orlando Sacha, Reynaldo Arenas, and Lourdes Berninzon. The film was directed by Luis Llosa Urquidi and written by Matt Leipzig. Hour of the Assassin was executive produced by Roger Corman.

== Plot ==
Employed by a group of generals, Martin Fiero (Estrada), a former Green Beret, is hired to assassinate the newly elected President of San Pedro de Tacna, Peru. They feel threatened by the liberal sympathies of the new president-elect. The generals, having killed Fiero's father years ago, trick Fiero into thinking he is working for the leftist People's Party. Meanwhile, a CIA agent, Sam Merrick (Vaughn), is sent to stop to the assassination. It is a race against time as the agent must stop Fiero before it is too late.

== Cast ==
- Erik Estrada as Martin Fierro
- Robert Vaughn as Sam Merrick
- Alfredo Álvarez Calderón as Ortiz
- Orlando Sacha as Folco
- Reynaldo Arenas as Paladoro
- Lourdes Berninzon as Adriana
- Ramón García as Navarro
- Oswaldo Fernández as Casals
- Ramón García Ribeyro as Andujar
- Gustavo MacLennan as Doc
- Alberto Montalva as Costa
- Francisco Giraldo as Roberto Villaverde
- Estela Paredes as Paladoro's Wife
- Javier Solís as Marcelo
- Franjo Antich as Tough Kid Motorbike
- Baldomero Cáceres as Tough Kid Castilla (credited as Baldomero Caceres)
- Maria Teresa Gagodorca as Luisa
- German Paredes as Santiago (credited as German Gonzales)

== Production ==
=== Filming ===
Hour of the Assassin was filmed in Peru.

== Release ==
Hour of the Assassin was released in theatres on January 23, 1987. During its theatrical release in Peru, the film surpassed one million viewers at the box office.

The film was released on VHS by Warner Home Video on May 26, 1987. Hour of the Assassin was released on DVD.

== See also ==
- List of American films of 1987
