= Tattoos in Memory =

- Theatrical release poster
- Directed by: Luis Llosa
- Screenplay by: Mario Vargas Llosa
- Based on: Memorias de un soldado desconocido by Lurgio Gavilán Sánchez
- Starring: Gianfranco Bustios
- Production company: Iguana Films
- Distributed by: Venus Films
- Release date: August 29, 2024
- Running time: 122 minutes
- Country: Peru
- Language: Spanish

Tattoos in Memory (Spanish: Tatuajes en la memoria) is a 2024 Peruvian drama film directed by Luis Llosa from a screenplay written by Mario Vargas Llosa, based on the autobiographical book Memorias de un soldado desconocido by Lurgio Gavilán Sánchez. It is about a former terrorist and soldier seeking redemption by becoming a Franciscan priest. It premiered on August 29, 2024, in Peruvian theaters.

== Synopsis ==
An orphaned boy from Ayacucho joins the Shining Path, but after experiencing violence, he seeks redemption as a soldier, Franciscan priest, and anthropologist.

== Cast ==
- Gianfranco Bustios
- Reynaldo Arenas
- Milene Vazquez
- Renata Flores
- Christian Esquivel as Lieutenant Shogun
- Kenyi Nizama
- Josué Cohello

== Production ==
Principal photography began on October 24, 2022, and ended on November 25, 2022, in Huanta, Ayacucho in Peru.
