= Crime Zone =

- Theatrical release poster
- Directed by: Luis Llosa
- Screenplay by: Daryl Haney
- Produced by: Luis Llosa
- Starring: David Carradine; Peter Nelson; Sherilyn Fenn; Michael Shaner
- Cinematography: Cusi Barrio
- Edited by: William Flicker
- Music by: Rick Conrad
- Production companies: New Concorde; Iguana Films
- Distributed by: New Concorde
- Release date: December 13, 1988
- Running time: 96 minutes
- Countries: United States; Peru
- Language: English

Crime Zone (also known as Calles Peligrossas in Peru) is a 1988 American-Peruvian science fiction action film directed by Luis Llosa, written by Daryl Haney and starring David Carradine, Peter Nelson, Sherilyn Fenn, and Michael Shaner. Carradine plays a mysterious stranger who recruits young lovers in an illicit romance (Nelson and Fenn) to commit a crime spree in a futuristic police state, while promising them an avenue for escape. The film was executive produced by Roger Corman, who came up with the original concept.

Due to a perceived lack of Peruvian qualities, it was better received by American than Peruvian critics. Corman's New Concorde co-produced and distributed it. After its Los Angeles premiere, it was released on VHS by MGM/UA.

== Plot ==
In the futuristic police state of Soleil, the government sets up a criminal, Hector, who walks into a police trap. Hector is captured alive at the behest of the police chief and is executed live on television after a brief show trial. Bone, a former security guard who has recently lost his job at a cryogenics facility for not showing the proper respect to authority, meets Helen, a woman forced into prostitution at the government-sanctioned brothel. They are immediately attracted to each other and begin a secret relationship, as unauthorized romantic and sexual activity is illegal for lower-class "subgrade" citizens like themselves. Bone's friend Creon becomes jealous of their relationship and demands that Bone share Helen with him; disgusted, Bone refuses, and they eventually come to blows over Creon's behavior.

One day, Bone and Helen, both disillusioned with Soleil's repressive society, steal some money from a supermarket. They are observed by a mysterious man named Jason, who offers them passage to Frodan, another nation at war with Soleil, in exchange for stealing records from a secure facility disguised as a hospital. Although suspicious of his offer, they accept and successfully deliver the information to Jason, who attempts to delay their reward and talk them into further criminal acts. Frustrated and short on money, Bone and Helen rob a bank, quickly becoming the most wanted criminals in Soleil. Creon attempts to blackmail Helen, but she dismisses his threats; before Creon can attack her, Bone saves her and tells Creon that he would kill him if he weren't leaving Soleil so soon. After losing faith in Jason's promises, Bone and Helen recruit their friends, J.D. and Alexi, to help them escape.

While on the run, Helen and Bone hide out in the so-called "plague zone", where they encounter Jason, who is revealed to be a government agent. Jason explains that the government long ago ended any major crime in Soleil, and it is his job to recruit citizens to go on government-sponsored crime sprees that validate the powers of the police state. Helen and Bone briefly take Jason hostage, then flee to a safer location, where they discuss plans to rob wealthy citizens stored in the cryogenics facility and hijack a military helicopter that Alexi can pilot to Frodan. Creon bullies J.D. into betraying Bone and Helen to the police, with whom he has made a deal. Bone kills his former boss at the facility, and Creon tries to take Helen hostage. However, the police arrive and betray Creon, as Helen warned him they would. Creon takes J.D. and Alexi hostage; when J.D. mocks him, Creon murders J.D.

At the military base, Helen and Bone, who managed to escape the facility, set Alexi free and use Creon as a distraction while they steal a helicopter. Creon begs to be taken with them, but they leave him behind for Jason to kill. Alexi flies Helen and Bone to Frodan, where they triumphantly land and celebrate their freedom. However, they discover the area to be a deserted wasteland, and Jason is waiting for them in a nearby aircraft hangar with a police escort.

The police escort kills Alexi, and is then killed by Jason. Jason reveals that the war with Frodan has been over for twenty years; the "plague zone" is, in fact, radioactive fallout from the destroyed Frodan that has drifted to Soleil. Due to Jason's knowledge of the truth, his position within the government is under threat, and the information stolen from the facility by Bone and Helen is his insurance, since the state can only sustain itself so long as the perceived threat of crime and war still exists. He thanks them for fulfilling his plan and allows them to escape, returning to Soleil alone. Bone and Helen, now free, walk off along the Frodan coast, their future uncertain.

== Cast ==
- David Carradine as Jason
- Peter Nelson as Bone
- Sherilyn Fenn as Helen
- Michael Shaner as Creon
- Orlando Sacha as Alexi
- Don Manor as J.D.
- Jorge Bustamante as Hector Beeko
- Diana Quijano as Policewoman

== Production ==
Executive producer Roger Corman, who came up with the film's concept, recruited Peruvian director Luis Llosa to make a futuristic thriller; Jeffrey Middents recounts what he calls an apocryphal story in which Corman signed a deal with Llosa while Corman was briefly delayed in a stopover in Peru. The film was shot in Peru and used postmodern architecture to affect a futuristic style. The extras were students and instructors from The American School of Lima. Llosa said he focused more on art direction than dialogue, and he shot at night to disguise the low budget. The film was a co-production between Corman's New Concorde and Llosa's Iguana Films.

== Release ==
Crime Zone was released in the United States by New Concorde in March 1989. MGM/UA released it on home video in May 1989. It was included in "Corman's Drive In", a subscription YouTube channel, in 2013.

== Reception ==
Academic Jeffrey Middents wrote that Crime Zone was better received in the United States than in its native Peru, whose critics rejected it as a Peruvian film. Middents states that the film was not rejected for being a genre film but instead because it did not have any uniquely Peruvian aspects, especially with its cast of American actors. Michael Wilmington of the Los Angeles Times criticized the film as humorless and grim, but he wrote that it rises above its low budget roots to become a competent Blade Runner clone. Drive-in movie critic Joe Bob Briggs wrote, "Sure, we've all seen this story before, but have we seen it with 1,000 Peruvian extras in shiny silver space suits? I think not."
