= Luis Llosa =

Peruvian film director (born 1951)

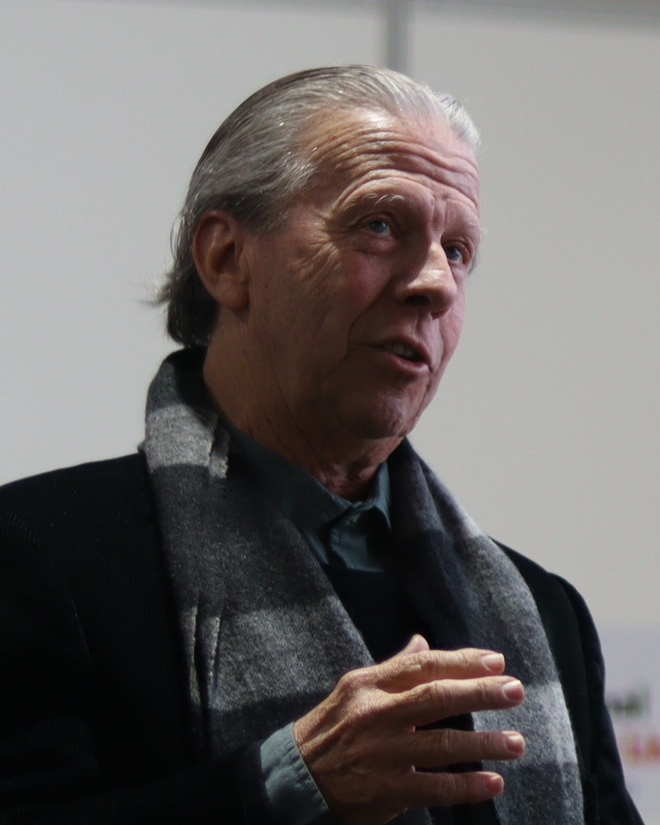
- Llosa at the FIL LIMA in 2024
- Born: 1951 (age 73–74); Lima, Peru
- Occupation(s): Film director and producer
- Notable work: Sniper; The Specialist; Anaconda

Luis Llosa Urquidi (born 1951) is a Peruvian film director. He is best known for his feature films Sniper (1993), The Specialist (1994), and Anaconda (1997).

== Career ==
Luis Llosa was originally a film critic. He is known for his early Peruvian work, English-language exploitation films made for producer Roger Corman, and bigger-budget American films. His best-known film, Anaconda, stars Jennifer Lopez, Ice Cube, Jon Voight, and Eric Stoltz. Anaconda was nominated for multiple Razzie Awards, including worst director, but grossed $136 million worldwide and became a cult film.

He founded Iguana Productions, which produces Peruvian films and telenovelas such as Escándalo, Torbellino and Latin Lover.

== Personal life ==
Llosa was born in 1951 in Lima, Peru. He is a cousin of Peruvian novelist Mario Vargas Llosa, and his niece is film director Claudia Llosa.

== Filmography ==
Year	Title	Director	Producer	Writer
1987	Hour of the Assassin	Yes	Yes	No
1989	Crime Zone	Yes	Yes	No
1993	Sniper	Yes	No	No
1993	Eight Hundred Leagues Down the Amazon	Yes	Yes	No
1993	Fire on the Amazon	Yes	Yes	No
1994	The Specialist	Yes	No	No
1997	Anaconda	Yes	No	No
2005	The Feast of the Goat	Yes	No	Yes
2020	Dueños del Tiempo	Yes	Yes	Yes
2024	Tattoos in Memory	Yes	No	No
