= Stripped to Kill =

- Theatrical release poster
- Directed by: Katt Shea
- Written by: Andy Ruben; Katt Shea
- Produced by: Mark Byers
- Starring: Kay Lenz; Greg Evigan; Norman Fell; Tracy Crowder; Debbie Nassar; Pia Kamakahi
- Cinematography: John LeBlanc
- Edited by: Zach Staenberg; Bruce Stubblefield
- Music by: John O'Kennedy
- Production company: Concorde Pictures
- Distributed by: Concorde Pictures
- Release date: March 20, 1987
- Running time: 88 minutes
- Country: United States
- Language: English

Stripped to Kill is a 1987 American erotic thriller/sexploitation film directed by Katt Shea and starring Greg Evigan, Kay Lenz and Norman Fell. Its plot follows a female Los Angeles police detective who goes undercover posing as a stripper to investigate a series of slayings connected to a strip club near Skid Row.

== Plot ==
While working undercover in Skid Row, Los Angeles, police officer Cody and her partner, Sergeant Heineman, witness a stripper named Angel being thrown off a bridge and set on fire. Their investigation leads to Cody posing undercover as a stripper at Rock Bottom, the club where the murdered woman was employed. Despite not being much of a dancer, Cody manages to win an amateur night, after which the club's owner, Ray, offers her a job.

Cody slowly befriends the other dancers, winning their trust. Meanwhile, another one of the dancers, Cinnamon, who's been let go by Ray due to her being addicted to pills, is strangled to death by the assailant with a metal cord.

When Cody and Heineman's superiors discover that she has been dancing at the club, they order her to stop. But Cody defies them. Tensions arise between her and Heineman, who has romantic feelings toward her. The two of them have sex, only to argue the following morning.

Heineman investigates a series of potential suspects, including Roxanne, a stripper who happened to be Angel's lover. He believes, however, that the killer is Pocket, a young man who's always at the club. Heineman confronts Pocket, only to discover that the man is missing his hand and his genitals from a war injury.

Cody pays a visit to Roxanne, encountering instead the woman's younger brother, Eric. When Eric's behavior reminds her of Roxanne's, Cody searches the apartment, discovering in the process a neighbor's corpse. Roxanne reveals herself to be Eric, dressed in drag; he has been posing and performing as his dead sister at the club, wearing fake latex breasts.

Eric explains that he killed Roxanne because he feared that she was going to leave him for her lover, Angel. Heineman arrives at the apartment and Eric shoots him. Cody flees, with Eric in pursuit. Their chase eventually leads them back to the Rock Bottom, where Eric begins indiscriminately shooting people. Cody douses Eric in gasoline, and when he tries to shoot her, he accidentally sets himself on fire. The fire spreads to Cody, but Heineman arrives and tamps it out. He reveals that he survived the gunshots thanks to a bulletproof vest. Cody, who realizes she's been shot in the leg, embraces Heineman.

== Cast ==
- Kay Lenz as Cody / Sunny
- Greg Evigan as Sergeant Heineman
- Norman Fell as Ray
- Tracy Crowder as Fanny
- Athena Worthey as Zeena
- Carlye Byron as Cinnamon
- Debbie Nassar as Dazzle
- Lucia Nagy Lexington as Brandy
- Michelle Foreman as Angel
- Pia Kamakahi as Eric / Roxanne
- Tom Ruben as Mobile Entrepreneur
- Diana Bellamy as Shirl

== Production ==
=== Development ===
The film was inspired by a visit Katt Shea and her husband and writing partner Andy Ruben made to a strip club.

Shea recalled: "I didn't want to go because I felt it was humiliating to women". But I finally got myself there. I sat down and began watching these acts and they're performing as if they really cared".

Shea later elaborated:

Before I did STRIPPED TO KILL you had never seen a girl dancing on a pole, no one had ever seen that in a movie, to my knowledge. Girls swinging around on a pole--that had not been done yet. So I think that was spectacular; it was crazy, it was wild. This is how it happened. I went to a strip club for the first time in my life and I saw a girl swinging around on a pole and I thought, 'Oh my god this has got to be in a movie!' I mean, nobody knows this goes on except a bunch of guys with dollar bills, so it just had to be exploited, I guess. I thought they were very artistic and I just loved the girls, they were real artists and they were just using this particular venue to explore their art.

She took the idea to Roger Corman for whom she had made a number of movies as an actor. Corman liked the basic idea but questioned the believability of a scene in which a man went undercover as a stripper. Shea brought in a female impersonator to see Corman and had him describe having done exactly that: "He [Corman] turned every shade. He was purple by the end. But then he said yes".

Lenz was worried about playing a stripper at age 34 until she found out in research many of the strippers had college student children.

== Criticism ==
Kay Lenz complained publicly about the film's editing and "exploitative" ad campaign aimed at the print media. The film was also controversial among transgender rights activists who felt that the film portrayed transgender people in a negative light.

== Reception ==
The Los Angeles Times said the film "fulfills its sex and violence quota-actually, it's fairly tame in these departments-but also has some style and substance as well".

The film was a hit and led to a sequel, shot on the same set as Dance of the Damned. The sequel was also directed by Shea who took her name off because of Corman's editing interference.
