= Killer Instinct (1992 David Tausik film) =

- Directed by: David Tausik
- Written by: David Tausik
- Produced by: Roger Corman; Mike Elliott
- Starring: Scott Valentine; Vanessa Angel
- Cinematography: Jennifer Stoltz
- Edited by: Richard Gentner; Lorne Morris
- Music by: Nigel Holton
- Production company: Concorde Pictures
- Release date: November 1992
- Running time: 92 minutes
- Country: United States
- Language: English

Killer Instinct, also called Homicidal Impulse, is a 1992 film written and directed by David Tausik.

== Plot ==
A young lawyer has problems with a case that he's been working on for over a year. The district attorney's niece helps him by first blackmailing, then plotting the murder of the D.A., while having a sexual relationship with the young lawyer, who eventually discovers the truth about her.

== Principal cast ==
- Scott Valentine as Tim Casey
- Vanessa Angel as Deborah Walker
- Talia Balsam as Emma
- Brian Cousins as Kent
- Kevin West as Egghead

== Reception ==
The film received a B− grade from Dennis Schwartz whereas the Roanoke Times called it "well worth watching".

In Germany, Frank Trebbin-Ecke called the film "nonsense" and the director David Tausik a "dwarf brain".
