= Dragon Fire (film) =

- Directed by: Rick Jacobson
- Written by: Robert King; Beverly Gray; Kevin Ingram
- Produced by: Mike Elliott
- Starring: Dominic La Banca; Pamela Pond; Kisu; Harold Hazeldine
- Cinematography: Michael Gallagher
- Edited by: John Gilbert
- Music by: John R. Graham
- Distributed by: NCA Pictures, New Horizon Picture Corp, Starlight
- Release date: 1993
- Running time: 90 minutes
- Country: United States
- Language: English

Dragon Fire is a 1993 martial arts film set in a dystopian Los Angeles in the year 2050. It is notable for heavily using actual kickboxing champions for the actors.

== Cast ==
- Dominick LaBanca as Laker Powers
- Pamela Pond as Marta
- Kisu as Slick
- Harold Hazeldine as Eddie
- Charles Philip Moore as Low-Ball
- Michael Blanks as Ahmed Mustafa
- Dennis Keiffer as Johnny Powers
- Roy Boesch as Official
- Manuel Luben as Manolo
- Randall Shiro Ideishi as Li (as Randy Ideishi)
- Richard Fuller as Hulk
- John Arthur as Black Ice
- Val Mijailovic as Morales
- Rae Manzon as Kemal
- Laura Neustedter as Woman Fighter
- Carolyn Raimondi as Woman Fighter
- Marc Wilder as Waheed
- Deon Edwards as Rankin
