= Wheels of Fire (film) =

- Theatrical poster
- Directed by: Cirio H. Santiago
- Written by: Frederick Bailey
- Story by: Ellen Collett
- Produced by: Cirio H. Santiago; Armida Reynolds
- Starring: Gary Watkins; Laura Banks; Lynda Wiesmeier; Linda Grovenor
- Cinematography: Ricardo Remias
- Edited by: Gervacio Santos (as George Saint)
- Music by: Christopher Young
- Production company: Rodeo
- Distributed by: Concorde Pictures
- Release date: September 1985
- Running time: 81 minutes
- Countries: United States; Philippines
- Language: English

Wheels of Fire (Also known as Vindicator and Desert Warrior ) is a 1985 American-Philippines film directed by Cirio H. Santiago. It was partly financed by Roger Corman and was one of the first movies distributed by Corman's new company, Concorde Pictures.

== Plot ==
In a post-apocalyptic future, the only semblance of order is an organized militia called "The Ownership" which seeks to peacefully convert scattered settlements to stable governments loyal to them, Trace is a wanderer who once worked for The Ownership, who is joined by his sister Arlie and her boyfriend, Bo; having saved them from a confrontation with a local gang.

Trace, Arlie and Bo soon encounter a band led by a man called "Scourge" and split up, Trace defeats the bandits following him, but Bo and Arlie are captured by Scourge's men. Bo is allowed to join the bandits, Arlie is taken by Scourge to be his sex slave. Back on the road, Trace saves a Mercenary called 'Stinger' from Scourge's men and the two join forces and continue on. Stinger and Trace find a group of 'Sand People' and rescue a psychic captive called 'Spike' who also joins them.

Stinger, Spike, and Trace leave together and find an Ownership fuel convoy that was attacked. They return the sole survivor to his community of 'True believers', Trace leave Stinger and Spike with the True Believers and continues on to find his sister. Scourge's men attack and destroy the True Believer camp, and when Trace returns he finds Stinger and the Ownership forces plotting a retaliatory strike. Trace notices his sisters locket around the neck of one of Scourge's dead men, In a rage, Trace ignores Stinger's requests for him to wait for the Ownership forces and a joint strike and goes alone.

Trace goes to Scourge's fortress and finds Arlie, while escaping Trace realizes that the Ownership is advancing into a trap set by Scourge. Arlie dies while disarming the trap before it destroys the Ownership forces. Outnumbered, Scourge runs away but Trace catches up with him and kills him with Arlie's car. Stinger leads the Ownership troops in claiming the fortress and is killed by Scourge's second in command.

== Cast ==
- Gary Watkins as Trace
- Laura Banks as Stinger
- Lynda Wiesmeier as Arlie
- Linda Grovenor as Spike
- Joseph Anderson as Scourge
- Joseph Zucchero as Whiz
- Jack S. Daniels as Scag
- Steve Parvin as Bo
- Nigel Hogge as Ambassador
- Dennis Cole as Harlan
- Don Gordon Bell as Robot

== Production ==
Wheels of Fire was filmed in part in the island of Corregidor in the Philippines.

Roger Corman invested money in the film. He had previously invested in a similar movie from Santiago, Styker (1983) which was distributed by Corman's former company, New World Pictures. However that company refused to distribute Wheels of Fire, contributing to Corman suing New World and setting up his own distribution arm again, Concorde Pictures. That company distributed Wheels of Fire.

Footage from the movie was reused in another post apocalpytic story shot in the Philippines directed by Santiago, Raiders of the Sun.

== Critical reception ==
Variety called Wheels of Fire a 'Bargain-Basement rip-off of The Road Warrior series'

The Los Angeles Times said "the script is not just bad it's unspeakably bad, soaked through with grungy, low life sadism."

One critic called it "this limp entry into the mid-’80s post-apocalyptic adventure genre" which "may have the undesirable triple honor of being the suckiest, sleaziest and dullest of the many Road Warrior rip-offs."
