= Screwballs II =

1985 film by Rafal Zielinski

Loose Screws
- DVD cover
- Directed by: Rafal Zielinski
- Written by: Michael Cory; Linda Shayne; Jim Wynorski
- Produced by: Maurice Edward Smith
- Starring: Bryan Genesse; Lance Van Der Kolk
- Cinematography: Robin Miller
- Edited by: Stephan Fanfara
- Music by: Fred Mollin
- Production company: Crazy Wheels Film Corporation
- Distributed by: Concorde Pictures
- Release date: August 1985
- Running time: 92 minutes
- Country: Canada
- Language: English

Screwballs II, also known as Loose Screws, is a 1985 Canadian teen sex comedy film. It is a sequel to Screwballs and was one of the first releases from Roger Corman's Concorde Pictures.

== Synopsis ==
Brad Lovett, Steve Hardman, Hugh G. Rection, and Marvin Eatmore are four get-nowhere boys who are forced into summer school, ending up at Coxville Academy under the supervision of Principal Arsenault. The boys play a game where they earn points for every girl with whom they score. On misadventures of their own, they decide to go for the ultimate 100-point score, Mona Lott, the new French teacher, but when they are unable to get a shot at her, they end up in the unforgiving clutches of the principal. After all is lost, they take one final chance during the school's anniversary celebration.

== Cast ==
- Bryan Genesse as Brad Lovett
- Lance Van Der Kolk as Steve Hardman
- Alan Deveau as Hugh G. Rection
- Jason Warren as Marvin Eatmore
- Annie McAuley as Nikki Nystroke
- Karen Wood as Gail Poulet
- Liz Green as Tracey Gratehead
- Mike MacDonald as Mr. Arsenault
- Cynthia Belliveau as Mona Lott (credited as Cyd Belliveau)
- Deborah Lobban as Hilda Von Blow
- Carolyn Tweedle as Female Teacher
- Stephanie Sulik as Claudia Arsenault
- Terrea Smith as Wendy, The Waitress (credited as Terrea Oster)
- Wayne Fleming as Pigpen M.C.
- Lisa Maggiore as Student

== Soundtrack ==
The soundtrack was handled by Fred Mollin; it includes songs by The Nu Kats:

1. "Changing" (Demi Moore - Freddy Moore) - The Nu Kats
2. "Circular Impressions" - (Denis Keldie - L. Stevenson) - The Extras
3. "Summer Fun" - (Bill King) - Bill King Quartet
4. "Jump For Joy" - (Tim Ryan - Jonathan Goldsmith - Kerry Crawford) - Tim Ryan
5. "Dance The Screw" - (Errol Francis - Susan Francis) - Errol Francis and the Francis Factor
6. "Dance Tonight" - (Errol Francis) - Errol Francis and the Francis Factor
7. "Do The Screw" - (Fred Mollin) - Meyer and Kronke
8. "School Break" - (Errol Francis - Susan Francis - Mark Francis) - Errol Francis and the Francis Factor
9. "Screw It" - (Denis Keldie - L. Stevenson) - Denis Keldie

== Reception ==
The Los Angeles Times said the film was "the formula in excelsis. The only real difference is that it's been pushed further than usual, one of the hallmarks of Roger Corman, whose Concorde Pictures released it (you expect more from Corman). The movie is single-mindedly prurient, and scenarist Michael Cory has come up with the lewdest language this side of Hustler. Almost every line in the movie is either unprintable or a double entendre".
