= Brussaard =

Brussard is a surname.Some notable people with the name include:

- Corina Brussaard, viral ecology scientist
- Jan Brussaard (1875–1940), Dutch sport shooter
- Jan Hendrik Brussaard (1899–1969), Dutch sport shooter

== See also ==
- Broussard, surname
- Bussard, surname
