= Broussard =

Broussard is a surname of French origin.

People with the surname include:

- Aaron Broussard (born 1949), American politician
- Allen Broussard (1929–1996), American jurist
- Alley Broussard (born 1983), American football player
- Ben Broussard (born 1976), American baseball player
- Bruce D. Broussard, American businessman
- Carroll Broussard, American basketball player
- Chris Broussard (born 1968), American sports analyst and commentator
- Edwin S. Broussard (1874–1934), American politician
- Émile Broussard (born 1895), French cyclist
- Fred Broussard (born 1933), American football player
- George Broussard, American video game producer
- Hugues Broussard (1934–2019), French swimmer
- Israel Broussard (born 1994), American actor
- Jamall Broussard (born 1981), American football player
- Joseph Broussard (1702–1765), Acadian leader
- Joseph Eloi Broussard (1866–1956), American miller
- Marc Broussard (born 1982), American singer
- Meredith Broussard, American academic
- Paul Broussard (1964–1991), American murder victim
- Philippe Broussard (born 1963), French journalist
- Ray Broussard (1937–1993), American jockey
- Rebecca Broussard (born 1963), American actress and model
- Robert F. Broussard (1864–1918), American politician
- Steve Broussard (born 1967), American football player and coach
- Steve Broussard (punter) (1949–2021), American football player
- Tess Broussard (born 1972), American actress and model

== Fictional characters ==
- Eric Broussard, in the television series Colony

== See also ==
- Boussard, surname
- Brussaard, surname
