= Broussard (disambiguation) =

Broussard is a surname.

Broussard may also refer to:

- Broussard, Louisiana, a city in the United States
- Broussard's, a restaurant in New Orleans, Louisiana
- Max Holste Broussard, a utility aircraft
