= Stone Cold Steve Austin =

American wrestler & actor (born 1964)

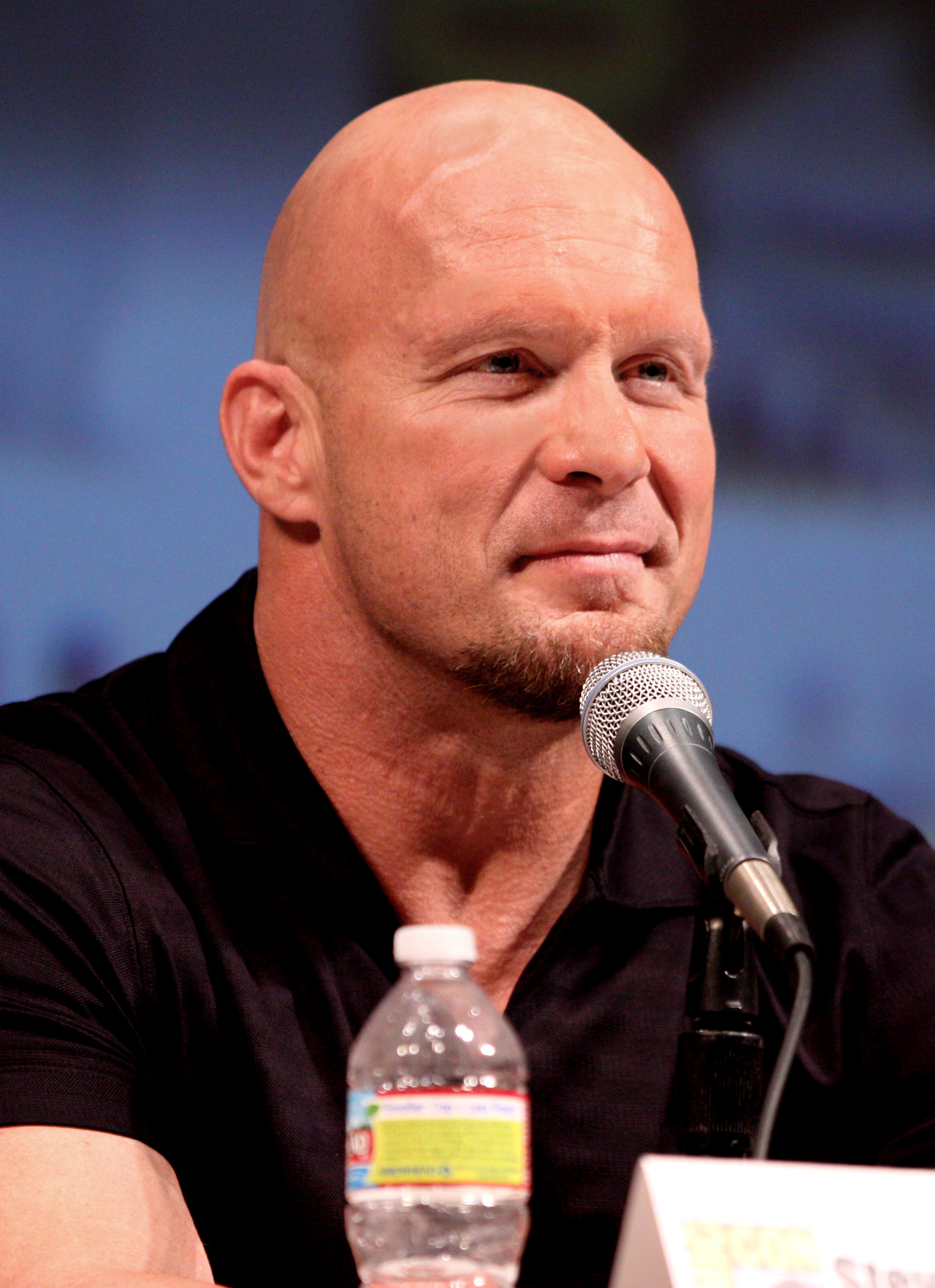
- Austin in 2010
- Born: Steven James Anderson; December 18, 1964 (age 61); Austin, Texas, U.S.
- Occupations: Media personality; actor; professional wrestler
- Years active: 1986–2003, 2022 (wrestling); 1999–present (media)
- Spouses: Kathryn Burrhus (m. 1990; div. 1992); Jeanie Clarke (m. 1992; div. 1999); Debra Marshall (m. 2000; div. 2003); Kristin Feres (m. 2009)
- Children: 3
- Professional wrestling career
- Ring name(s): The Ringmaster "Stone Cold" Steve Austin "Stunning" Steve Austin "Superstar" Steve Austin; Steve Williams
- Billed height: 6 ft 2 in (188 cm)
- Billed weight: 252 lb (114 kg)
- Billed from: Victoria, Texas; Hollywood, California (as "Stunning" Steve Austin)
- Trained by: Chris Adams
- Debut: 1986
- Retired: March 30, 2003

Signature
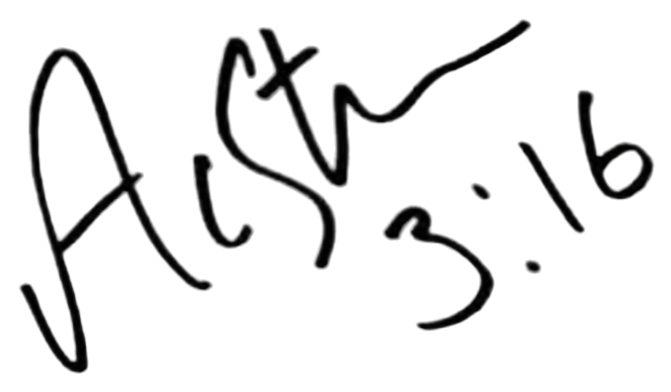
- Website: brokenskullranch.com

Steve Austin (born Steven James Anderson and formerly Steven James Williams; December 18, 1964), also known by his ring name Stone Cold Steve Austin, is an American media personality, actor, and retired professional wrestler. He is signed to WWE, as an ambassador. Widely regarded as one of the greatest professional wrestlers of all time, he was integral to the development and success of the World Wrestling Federation (WWF, now WWE) during the Attitude Era, an industry boom period in the late 1990s and early 2000s where wrestling reached the peak of its mainstream popularity.

Austin began his professional wrestling career in 1989, after playing college football at the University of North Texas. He signed with World Championship Wrestling (WCW) in 1991 and adopted the persona of "Stunning" Steve Austin, a villainous in-ring technician, and he won the WCW World Television Championship and the WCW United States Heavyweight Championship twice each, alongside one reign with a double crown of the WCW World Tag Team Championship and NWA World Tag Team Championship, with Brian Pillman (as the Hollywood Blondes). After a brief stint in Extreme Championship Wrestling (ECW), Austin signed with the World Wrestling Federation (WWF, now WWE) in 1995.

In the WWF's New Generation Era, Austin initially debuted under the short-lived gimmick of The Ringmaster, an in-ring technician character. He was then repackaged as a short-tempered, brash and brazen anti-establishment antihero named "Stone Cold" Steve Austin, rising to popularity with the King of the Ring (1996), Austin 3:16 promo, and feud with Bret Hart. From 1997 to 2001, Austin became the most popular wrestler of the Attitude Era via his feuds with The Rock and company chairman Vince McMahon. He won the WWF Championship six times, and the Royal Rumble a record of 3 times, in 1997, 1998 and 2001, as well as becoming the fifth WWF Triple Crown Champion. He was forced to retire from in-ring competition in 2003 after multiple knee injuries and a serious neck injury at the 1997 SummerSlam event, making sporadic appearances ever since including one final match against Kevin Owens at WrestleMania 38. He has been inducted into the WWE Hall of Fame on two separate occasions: individually in 2009 and in 2025 with Bret Hart in the "Immortal Moment" category for their match at WrestleMania 13.

Austin hosts the podcast The Steve Austin Show (2013–present), and the video podcast Broken Skull Sessions (2019–2022) available on the WWE Network and Peacock. He collaborates with El Segundo Brewing on Broken Skull IPA and Broken Skull American Lager. He also hosted the reality competition series Steve Austin's Broken Skull Challenge (2014–2017) and Straight Up Steve Austin (2019–2021). Since 2023, Austin has competed in desert racing with a UTV.

== Early life ==
Steve Austin was born Steven James Anderson on December 18, 1964, in Austin, Texas. After his parents divorced, his mother moved the family to Victoria, Texas, raising Austin and his two brothers, Scott and Kevin, as a single parent. She later married Ken Williams, who adopted the children; Austin's name was legally changed to Steven James Williams. The family eventually settled in Edna, Texas. Austin also has a third brother, Jeff, and a sister, Jennifer.

He attended Edna High School where he was a running back for the schools football team all 4 years. Following his graduation he then attended Wharton County Junior College for one year where he played linebacker. After a successful season with the team he was offered a full scholarship and transferred to the University of North Texas. He continued playing as a linebacker but switched to defensive end after a knee injury. Austin's father also played football at Rice University. Austin later reflected on his football career stating "It was a fun experience," "I had dreams of being a pro football player but just couldn't quite make the grade by a long-shot on that. I was a good player at the local or regional level. Beyond that, those guys had too much talent." He ultimately dropped out of college just a few credits short of graduating.

Austin developed an early interest in professional wrestling, regularly watching Houston Wrestling promoted by Paul Boesch. While in college, he lived near the Dallas Sportatorium, where World Class Championship Wrestling (WCCW) held events. He legally changed his name to Steve Austin in December 2007.

== Professional wrestling career ==
=== Early career (1986–1991) ===
Steve Austin began his wrestling training in 1986 under Chris Adams at the Dallas Sportatorium, when Adams was affiliated with World Class Wrestling Association (WCWA, formerly WCCW). Although the training emphasized technical skills, Austin later expressed dissatisfaction with the lack of instruction on the business side of wrestling.

Austin made his in-ring debut later that year in a televised WCWA match using his real name at the time, Steve Williams. During the merger of WCWA and the Memphis-based Continental Wrestling Association into the United States Wrestling Association (USWA), he began wrestling under the name "Steve Austin", a change made to avoid confusion with "Dr. Death" Steve Williams. He competed primarily in Dallas and was managed by Percy Pringle (later known as Paul Bearer in WWF) during this period. One of his early storylines involved a feud with his trainer, Chris Adams.

=== World Championship Wrestling (1991–1995) ===
I was by no means an overnight success. What success I eventually did attain was the result of hard work. I always had a competitive nature. I learned the mechanics of wrestling really well and really fast. I learned how to have a good match, but I didn't have the right gimmick.

— Austin discussing the lack of success he attained early in his career

==== Dangerous Alliance (1991–1992) ====
Austin debuted in World Championship Wrestling in May 1991. He was nicknamed "Stunning" Steve Austin, a name and gimmick he later said he could not commit to. Austin was originally paired with a valet named Vivacious Veronica but was later joined by Jeannie Adams, known as "Lady Blossom". Just weeks after his debut, Austin defeated Bobby Eaton for his first WCW World Television Championship on June 3, and later that year joined Paul E. Dangerously's Dangerous Alliance. Austin lost the WCW World Television Championship to Barry Windham in a two-out-of-three-falls match on April 27, but regained the championship from Windham the following month. He enjoyed a second lengthy reign as champion, before losing the championship to Ricky Steamboat at Clash of the Champions XX in September 1992, while the Dangerous Alliance disbanded shortly thereafter.

In August and September 1992, as part of a working agreement between WCW and New Japan Pro-Wrestling (NJPW), Austin wrestled four matches in Japan. He took part in the 1992 G1 Climax, defeating Arn Anderson in the first round before losing to Keiji Muto in the second round. He and Arn Anderson then defeated Raging Staff (Super Strong Machine and Tatsutoshi Goto) in a tag team bout held in the Ryōgoku Kokugikan in Tokyo. In his final bout, Austin challenged Masahiro Chono for the NWA World Heavyweight Championship in the main event of the "Battle Hold Arena" event at the Yokohama Arena, losing by submission after Chono applied an STF. During the match, Chono suffered a legitimate broken neck from a botched tombstone piledriver by Austin.

==== Hollywood Blonds; Stud Stable (1992–1993) ====
In September 1992, Austin formed a tag team known as the Hollywood Blonds with Brian Pillman, at the behest of lead booker Dusty Rhodes. Austin would later say that he was not excited about being placed into a tag team, as he was earmarked for a run with the WCW United States Heavyweight Championship with Harley Race as his manager. Initially billed under their individual personas, Pillman decided the pair needed their own finishing move, ring gear and team name, with traveling partner Scott Levy proposing the Hollywood Blonds, used in the 1970s by Buddy Roberts and Jerry Brown. At Halloween Havoc in October 1992, Austin (substituting for Terry Gordy) teamed with "Dr. Death" Steve Williams to wrestle Dustin Rhodes and Windham for the unified WCW and NWA World Tag Team Championship, wrestling to a 30-minute time limit draw.

On March 27, 1993, the Hollywood Blonds won the unified NWA and WCW World Tag Team Championship by defeating Ricky Steamboat and Shane Douglas, and held the championship for five months. In the main event of Clash of the Champions XXIII in June 1993, the Blondes defended their championship against Ric Flair and Arn Anderson in a two-out-of-three-falls, where despite losing the first two falls, retained the championship as the second fall had been determined by a disqualification caused by Barry Windham. At Clash of the Champions XXIV In August 1993, Austin and Pillman were scheduled to defend their championship against Anderson and Paul Roma but a legitimately injured Pillman was replaced by Steven Regal, with whom Austin lost to Anderson and Roma.

With Pillman injured, Austin joined Colonel Robert Parker's Stud Stable. After Pillman returned, the team was broken up when Austin turned on him, a decision Austin describes as a "mystery". Austin defeated Pillman in a singles match at Clash of the Champions XXV in November 1993.

==== United States Champion; departure (1993–1994) ====
At Starrcade '93: 10th Anniversary in December 1993, Austin defeated Dustin Rhodes 2–0 in a two-out-of-three-falls match to win the WCW United States Championship. At Clash of the Champions XXVIII in August 1994, Austin lost the Championship to Ricky Steamboat. He was scheduled to face Steamboat in a rematch at Fall Brawl '94: War Games in September 1994; however, Steamboat was unable to wrestle due to a legitimate back injury and Austin was awarded the championship by forfeit. His second reign with the championship ended just five minutes later when he lost to Steamboat's replacement, Jim Duggan, in a match that lasted 35 seconds. Austin unsuccessfully challenged Duggan for the championship at both Halloween Havoc in October 1994 and Clash of the Champions XXIX in November 1994. The influence of Hulk Hogan and the Hulkamania era was beginning to take hold in WCW, with vice president Eric Bischoff saying this was likely the reason Austin lost to Duggan, who had been a popular figure during that period of time. Around this time, Austin pitched a storyline idea to Bischoff in which it would be revealed that Austin was a family member of Hogan. The proposal was quickly turned down on account of Bischoff's belief that Hogan would not work with somebody such as Austin, who was not a proven name.

Following Clash of the Champions XXIX, Austin was inactive while rehabilitating a knee injury, returning in February 1995. In April 1995, Austin took part in a tournament for the vacant United States Championship, defeating Jim Duggan via countout in the first round but losing to Randy Savage in the quarter-final. He wrestled what would be his final match with WCW on May 21, 1995, defeating Eddie Jackie in a bout that aired on WCW Main Event. In late May and June 1995, Austin again appeared with New Japan Pro-Wrestling as part of its "Fighting Spirit Legend" series, primarily teaming with Arn Anderson and Ron Simmons. At the "Super Power Group Declaration VI" event in the Nippon Budokan in Tokyo, Austin, Anderson, and Mike Enos lost to J-J-Jacks (Akira Nogami and Takayuki Iizuka) and Junji Hirata in a six-man tag team match.

During the NJPW tour, Austin suffered a torn triceps. While rehabilitating, Austin was fired by WCW President Eric Bischoff on September 15, 1995. Bischoff did not see Austin as a marketable wrestler, and additionally thought Austin was hard to work with.

=== Extreme Championship Wrestling (1995) ===
Paul E. gives me a call and gives me a free platform to start venting and cutting the promos and putting a microphone in front of my face. I get a chance to speak what's on my mind and from my heart, and I find that is where the best promos come from, the ones that come from your gut and your heart — and from your brain, because you've got to feel them. Words don't mean anything if you don't mean them. So that was the basis for everything that Stone Cold was to become.

— Austin discussing his time in ECW

Austin was contacted by Paul Heyman of Extreme Championship Wrestling (ECW), who had previously managed him in WCW. Heyman hired him to do promos and in-ring interviews as he had not adequately recovered from his injury, paying Austin $500 (equivalent to $1,056 in 2025) a night. Changing his nickname to "Superstar", Austin debuted in ECW at Gangstas Paradise on September 18, 1995.

While in ECW, Austin used the platform to develop his future "Stone Cold" persona as well as a series of vignettes running down WCW in general and Bischoff in particular, most memorably in several promos that mocked his then-status as Nitro host by introducing Monday NyQuil, where he was joined by "Bongo" (a set of drums, meant to represent Steve "Mongo" McMichael) in promoting the show "where the big boys play with each other." Several wrestlers have credited ECW as the place where Austin developed his microphone skills. Austin has credited Heyman as the man who taught him how to cut a promo.

Whipwreck, who was the ECW World Heavyweight Champion at the time, defeated Austin in an upset to retain the championship at November to Remember on November 18. At December to Dismember on December 9, Whipwreck defended the title against Austin and The Sandman in a three way dance. Austin eliminated Whipwreck from the match by pinning him following a Stun Gun, but was pinned himself after The Sandman punched him using brass knuckles.

=== World Wrestling Federation/World Wrestling Entertainment/WWE ===
==== The Ringmaster and birth of "Stone Cold" (1996) ====
Austin joined the WWE at the end of 1995 after Diesel and Jim Ross helped convince WWF's owner Vince McMahon to hire him. He debuted in WWF on December 18, 1995, which was broadcast on the January 8, 1996, episode of Raw, using the moniker "The Ringmaster" and was awarded the Million Dollar Championship by his manager, Ted DiBiase. In his debut match on Raw he defeated Matt Hardy. While making his first pay-per-view (PPV) appearance at the Royal Rumble, he was scripted to be among the final four wrestlers in the ring, which could have given him an early push; however, The Ringmaster failed to hang onto the ropes after Fatu clotheslined him over and slipped out of the ring early.

Austin soon thought the Ringmaster gimmick was weak and asked for a change. Having battled thinning hair for a few years, he decided to shave his head in early 1996. He later said in a 2017 interview, "After watching the Pulp Fiction movie with Bruce Willis, that's the haircut that inspired me. I was traveling on the road to Pittsburgh with Dustin Rhodes and before I went to the show, I said fuck it. I went into the bathroom with a razor blade and shaved all my hair off. Then I grew the goatee and everything came full circle." By March 11, having thankfully missed out on the "opportunity" to be renamed Fang McFrost, among others, his Ringmaster moniker (now merely a prefix to his ring name) would be discarded in favor of his most famous ring name, "Stone Cold" Steve Austin, in a match against Savio Vega. The new name was prompted by his English wife at the time, Jeanie, who told him to drink a cup of tea she had made for him before it became "stone cold". His new persona was partially inspired by serial killer Richard "the Iceman" Kuklinski.

Austin wrestled Vega on Raw to a double countout, before defeating him in his first WrestleMania appearance at WrestleMania XII. At In Your House: Beware of Dog, Austin lost a Caribbean strap match to Vega, with the added stipulation that DiBiase was forced to leave the WWF as a result, leading Austin to quietly vacate the Million Dollar title. DiBiase would later say that nobody foresaw the success Austin would have, and had advised him to ignore the advice given to him by producers and continue what he was doing as success required patience.

==== Austin 3:16 and rise to superstardom (1996–1997) ====
"You sit there and you thump your Bible, and you say your prayers, and it didn't get you anywhere! Talk about your Psalms, talk about John 3:16... Austin 3:16 says I just whipped your ass!"

— Austin addressing Jake "The Snake" Roberts in his coronation promo at King of the Ring 1996

After several months of competing as a mid-card talent and doing little of note, Austin's rise in popularity began at the 1996 King of the Ring, where he won the tournament by defeating Jake "The Snake" Roberts. The win would prove to be an unexpected stroke of luck as Hunter Hearst Helmsley was originally scheduled to win the tournament, but he was legitimately punished for taking part in the Curtain Call incident before the tournament. At the time, Roberts was portraying a born-again Christian, which inspired Austin to ad-lib a famous promo during his post-win coronation, kayfabe mocking Roberts' religious faith and proclaiming the now-iconic catchphrase "Austin 3:16" as derision of the Bible verse John 3:16. At the conclusion of this same promo, he further ad-libbed the line, "And that's the bottom line, cuz Stone Cold said so." This was his first-ever usage of the "Austin 3:16" tagline, and his most prominent usage thus far of "that's the bottom line", both of which would eventually figure among the most iconic catchphrases in wrestling history and feature on one of the best-selling T-shirts in WWE merchandise history. Years later, Austin would say of this moment, "It's like I got two at-bats and hit two grand slams."

"Stone Cold" Steve Austin on King of the Ring (1996), on his right side Dok Hendrix and pointing to Jake "The Snake" Roberts

His raw speech, which included the word "ass" and the unintentional sacrilegious reference, sparked the gradual cultivation of his persona as a foul-mouthed, sadistic and antihero character. After defeating Yokozuna on the SummerSlam Free For All pre-show, Austin would speak about Bret Hart, challenging him constantly and taunting him relentlessly throughout August and September before Hart finally returned on Raw after a six-month hiatus on October 21 to challenge Austin to a match at Survivor Series, which he accepted. This would mark the start of the long Austin-Hart rivalry.

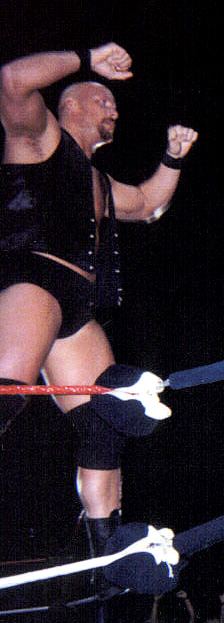
Austin in 1996.

During an episode of Superstars, old friend Brian Pillman conducted an interview with Austin regarding his upcoming match. After Pillman inadvertently complimented Hart, Austin grew angry and attacked him. He then proceeded to wedge Pillman's ankle in between a steel chair and stomp on it, breaking his ankle in storyline. It would lead to the infamous "Pillman's got a gun" segment on Raw wherein Austin broke into Pillman's home while he was nursing his injury. At Survivor Series, Austin met Hart as expected in a match to determine the number-one contender for the WWF Championship, in what would be Austin's first major PPV match in his WWF career. Hart defeated Austin by using a turnbuckle to push himself backward while locked in the Million Dollar Dream, in a match that lasted almost half an hour. Despite the loss and his status as a heel character, Austin received significant cheers from the crowd.

During the 1997 Royal Rumble match, Austin was originally eliminated by Hart but the officials did not see it; he snuck back into the ring and eliminated Hart by throwing him over the ropes, winning the match. This led to the first-ever PPV main event of Austin's WWF career at In Your House 13: Final Four, where he competed in a four corners elimination match against Hart, The Undertaker, and Vader for the vacant WWF Championship. Austin was eliminated early from the match after injuring his knee; Hart would win the match and the championship. Hart lost the championship the next night on Raw to Sycho Sid due to Austin's interference, continuing their feud. At WrestleMania 13, Hart defeated Austin in a highly acclaimed submission match with Ken Shamrock as a special referee. During the match, Hart and Austin made a double turn, changing Austin to babyface. Austin portrayed an anti-hero instead of a traditional babyface. Austin's public popularity surged following the Wrestlemania clash, and Austin 3:16 merchandise t-shirts were reported in May 1997 to have become the best-selling WWF t-shirts since Hulkamania. Austin eventually got his revenge on Hart in the main event of In Your House 14: Revenge of the 'Taker, defeating him in a match to determine the next contender to The Undertaker's WWF Championship. Austin won when Hart was disqualified due to assistance from The British Bulldog. At In Your House 15: A Cold Day in Hell, Austin had The Undertaker down with the Stone Cold Stunner but was distracted by Pillman, allowing The Undertaker to recover and perform a Tombstone Piledriver for the victory.

Austin won the WWF Tag Team Championship twice: first with Shawn Michaels, who vacated the title due to an injury, and with Dude Love. Austin also feuded with Owen Hart, facing him during a ten-man Tag Team match at In Your House 16: Canadian Stampede. At SummerSlam 1997, Austin defeated Owen for the Intercontinental Championship. During the match, Owen botched a Sit-out Piledriver and dropped Austin on his head, resulting in a legitimate bruised spinal cord and temporary paralysis for Austin. Due to the severity of his neck injury, Austin was forced to relinquish both championships. On September 22, on the first-ever Raw to be broadcast from Madison Square Garden, McMahon told Austin he wasn't physically cleared to compete, and after several weeks of build-up, Austin delivered his Stone Cold Stunner to McMahon, causing the fans in attendance to go ballistic. Austin was then arrested as part of the storyline, and was sidelined until Survivor Series. However, in the interim, he made several appearances, one being at Badd Blood where he was involved in the finish of a match between Owen and Faarooq for the vacant Intercontinental Championship. Austin hit Faarooq with the Intercontinental Championship belt while the referee's back was turned, causing Hart to win the match and the title. Austin's motive was to keep Owen as champion, as demonstrated when he interfered in Hart's matches on Raw. Austin regained the Intercontinental Championship from Hart at Survivor Series.

With Owen Hart out of the way, Austin set his sights on The Rock, who stole Austin's championship belt after Austin suffered a beating by his Nation of Domination stablemates. In the weeks to come, The Rock began declaring himself to be "the best damn Intercontinental Champion ever." The Rock kept possession of the championship belt until D-Generation X: In Your House, when Austin defeated him to retain the championship and regain the belt. As Austin had used his pickup truck to aid his victory, McMahon ordered him to defend the championship against The Rock the next night on Raw. In an act of defiance, Austin forfeited the championship to The Rock before tossing the belt into the Piscataqua River.

==== Feud with Vince McMahon (1998–1999) ====
After Bret Hart's controversial departure for WCW, Austin and Michaels were the top stars in the company. Austin won the 1998 Royal Rumble, lastly eliminating The Rock. The next night on Raw, Austin interrupted Vince McMahon in his presentation of Mike Tyson, who was making a special appearance, over the objection of McMahon referring to Tyson as "the baddest man on the planet". Austin insulted Tyson by flipping him off, which led to Tyson shoving Austin much to McMahon's embarrassment, who began publicly to disapprove of the prospect of Austin as his champion. Tyson was later announced as "the special enforcer" for the main event at WrestleMania XIV, and aligned himself with Michaels's stable D-Generation X (DX). This led to Austin's WWF Championship match against Michaels at WrestleMania XIV, which he won with help from Tyson, who turned on DX by making the deciding three-count against Michaels and later hit him with his knock-out punch. This was Michaels's last match until 2002 as he had suffered two legitimate herniated discs and another completely crushed at the hands of The Undertaker in a casket match at the Royal Rumble. With Michaels's absence and Austin winning the WWF Championship, the "Austin Era" was ushered in.

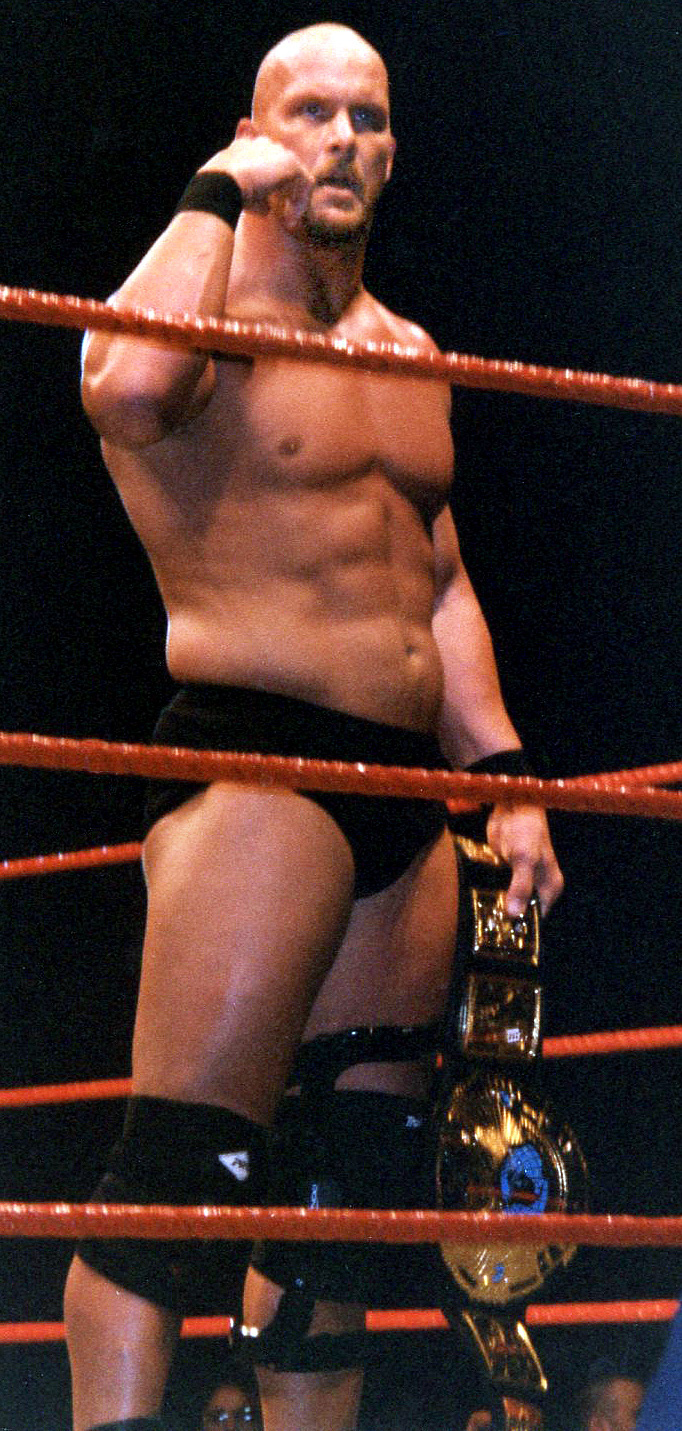
Austin as WWF Champion

On Raw the following night, McMahon presented Austin with a new championship belt and warned him that he did not approve of his rebellious nature, desiring a "corporate champion"; Austin responded by defeating McMahon's wrestler, Dude Love, at Unforgiven: In Your House, and Over the Edge: In Your House. Austin lost the WWF Championship to Kane in a First Blood match. Austin regained the title the next night on Raw. After defeating The Undertaker at SummerSlam, the title was vacated after a controversial finish during a Triple Threat match at Breakdown: In Your House between The Undertaker, Kane and Austin. At Rock Bottom: In Your House, Austin defeated The Undertaker in a Buried Alive match after Kane performed a Tombstone Piledriver on The Undertaker which sent him into the grave. With this victory, Austin qualified for the 1999 Royal Rumble. Austin's next appearance after this would be the January 4, 1999, edition of Raw, where he would come out to help Mankind defeat The Rock to become the WWF Champion by striking The Rock in the face with a steel chair and draping Mankind's body over him.

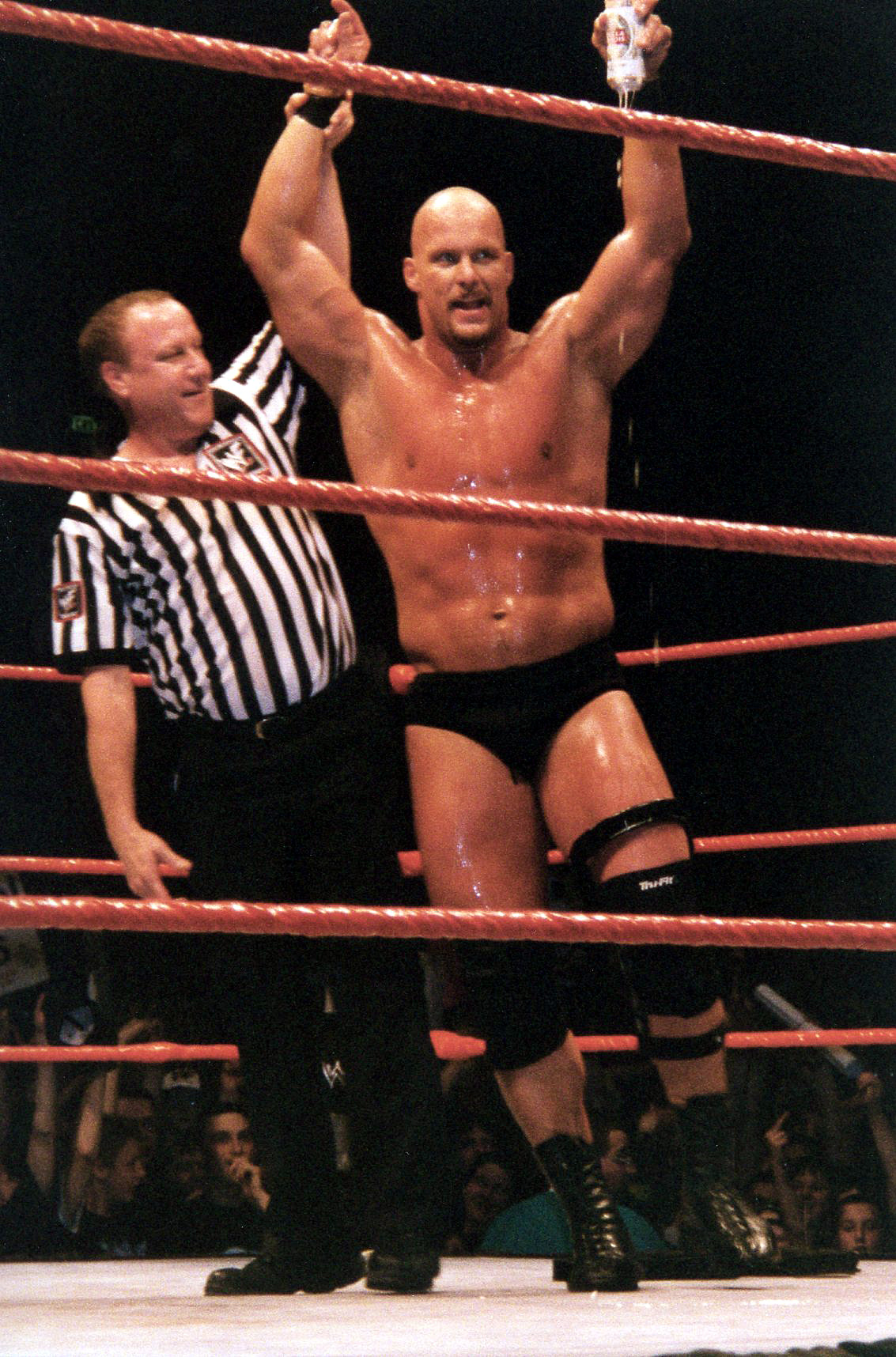
Austin celebrates with referee Earl Hebner.

Austin participated in the Royal Rumble match, where he was the last wrestler eliminated by the winner Mr. McMahon. Austin defeated McMahon St. Valentine's Day Massacre in a steel cage match, winning the championship opportunity at WrestleMania XV, where he defeated The Rock to win his third WWF Championship. Austin faced The Rock in a rematch the following month at Backlash. Austin would lose the championship to The Undertaker at Over the Edge. Due to events revolving around Vince, Stephanie and Linda McMahon made Austin the chief executive officer (CEO) of the company as part of the storyline. Vince and Shane challenged Austin to a handicap ladder match at King of the Ring with the title of CEO on the line, which the McMahons won. The next night on Raw, Austin challenged and defeated The Undertaker to win his fourth WWF Championship. The two would compete in a "First Blood" match at Fully Loaded, with the stipulation that if Austin lost he would never compete for the WWF Championship again, but if Austin won, Vince would depart the company; Austin won after interference from X-Pac.

==== Championship reigns and The Alliance (1999–2001) ====
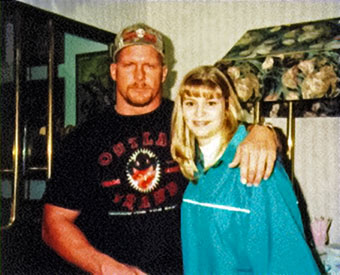
Austin with a fan

Austin held on to the WWF Championship until SummerSlam on August 22 when he lost it to Mankind in a triple threat match also featuring Triple H. in the two months that followed, Triple H would gain possession of the title. Austin would get his rematch at No Mercy on October 17 against Triple H, but Austin lost after The Rock accidentally struck him with a sledgehammer shot meant for Triple H. The three were advertised for a triple-threat match at Survivor Series on November 14, where Austin was run down by a car. The segment was to write him off television, with the neck injury suffered two years prior posing a real threat of early retirement, and was advised to undergo surgery. Austin would later describe this as "the worst storyline I was ever involved in".

Austin made a one-off appearance at Backlash on April 30, 2000, attacking Triple H and Vince McMahon to help The Rock reclaim the WWF Championship. After Austin's official return at Unforgiven on September 24, Commissioner Mick Foley led an investigation to find out who ran Austin over, with the culprit revealed to be Rikishi. At No Mercy on October 22, Austin faced Rikishi in a No Holds Barred match, during which Austin attempted to run Rikishi down in a truck, but was prevented from doing so by officials, and the match was deemed a no contest; Austin was subsequently arrested. During a handicap match against Rikishi and Kurt Angle, Triple H came down with the apparent intention of teaming with Austin, only to hit Austin with a sledgehammer and reveal he had instructed Rikishi to run him over. At Survivor Series on November 19, Triple H aimed to run Austin down again during their match but his plot failed when Austin lifted Triple H's car with a forklift, then let it drop 20 feet. Austin won his third Royal Rumble match on January 21, 2001, last eliminating Kane. His rivalry against Triple H ended at No Way Out on February 25 in a Three Stages of Hell match, with Triple H defeating Austin two falls to one.

With The Rock defeating Angle for the WWF Championship at No Way Out, Austin was again set to face him at WrestleMania X-Seven on April 1. In the weeks leading up to WrestleMania, animosity grew between Austin and The Rock, stemming from Austin's wife, Debra, being assigned to be The Rock's manager by McMahon. The match at WrestleMania was made a no disqualification match. During the match, McMahon came to the ring, preventing The Rock from pinning Austin on two separate occasions and giving Austin a steel chair. Austin then hit The Rock several times with the chair before pinning him to win the WWF Championship for the fifth time. After the match, Austin shook hands with McMahon, turning heel for the first time since 1997. During a steel cage match with The Rock in a rematch for the WWF Championship the following night on Raw is War, Triple H came down to the ring with a sledgehammer. After teasing siding with The Rock, Triple H instead aligned himself with Austin and McMahon, attacking The Rock and put him out of action. Austin further cemented his heel turn the following Thursday on SmackDown!, when, during an interview with Jim Ross about his actions at WrestleMania, he thought Ross was denouncing their friendship and then assaulted Ross. Austin and Triple H became a team known as The Two-Man Power Trip. Austin altered his character considerably over the next few months by becoming a whiny, temperamental prima donna who complained incessantly when he felt he was not getting respect. He also developed a strange infatuation with McMahon, going to great lengths to impress him, even going so far as to hug him and bring him presents.

Austin and Triple H ran roughshod over all their opponents, until coming up against The Undertaker and Kane. After defeating them for the WWF Tag Team Championship at Backlash on April 29, they held the tag team titles, the WWF Championship (Austin) and the Intercontinental Championship (Triple H) all at once. On the May 21 episode of Raw is War, Austin and Triple H defended the WWF Tag Team Championship against Chris Benoit and Chris Jericho; during the match, Triple H legitimately tore his quadriceps, and the team lost the match and the tag team championship. Austin officially broke up The Power Trip on that week's SmackDown!, criticizing Triple H for his injury and for hitting him with the sledgehammer. He continued to align himself with McMahon and began feuding with Jericho and Benoit by himself, leading to a triple-threat match at King of the Ring on June 24; despite interference from the debuting Booker T, Austin retained the championship.

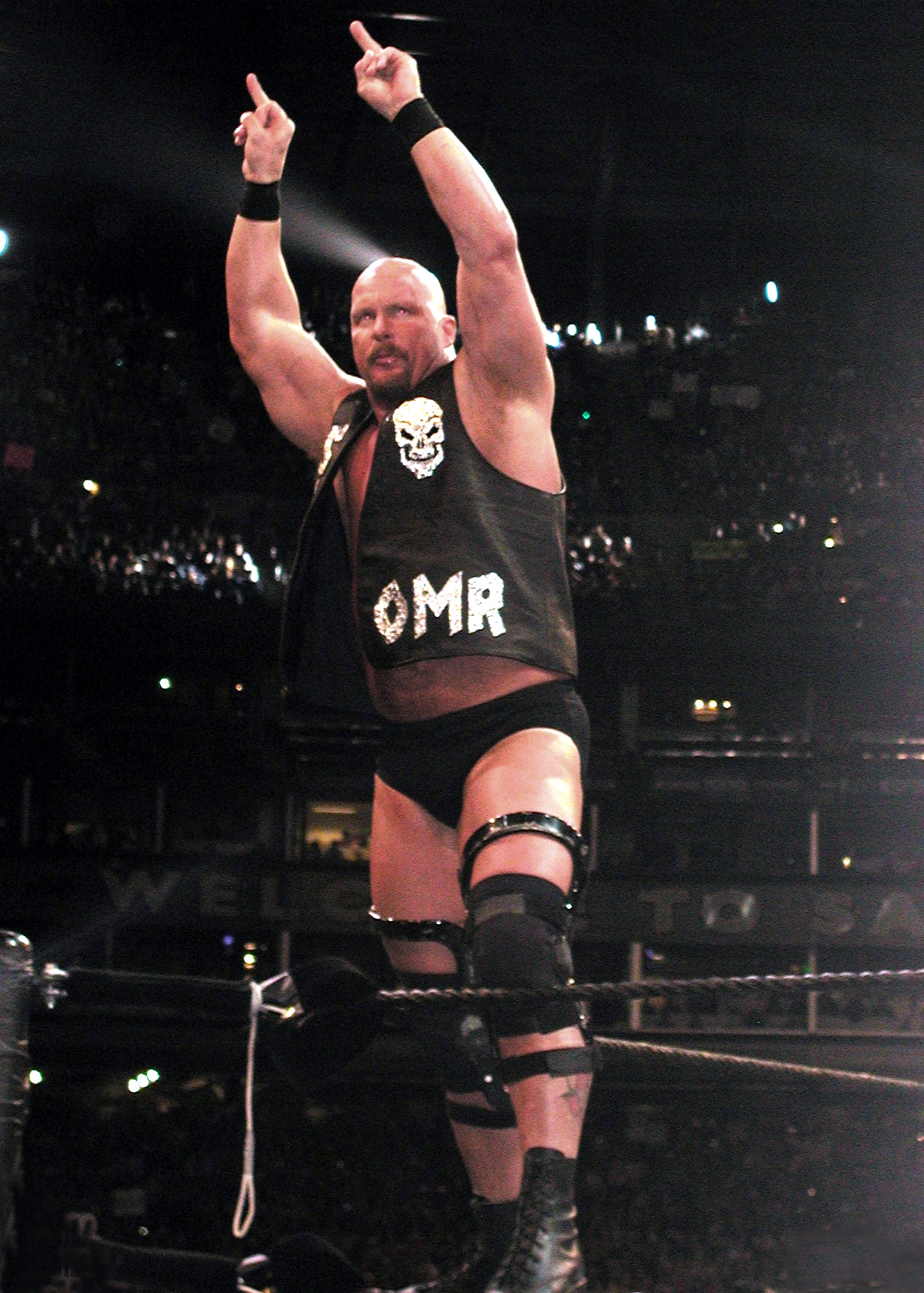
Austin's signature "flipping off" the crowd pose

Meanwhile, the purchase of WCW by Vince McMahon began to bear fruit as The Invasion began. Invading WCW wrestlers formed an alliance with a group of ECW wrestlers, with the group led by Shane and Stephanie McMahon. Vince called Austin out and demanded that he bring "the old Stone Cold" back so he could effectively captain a team of WWF wrestlers in a ten-man tag team match at Invasion on July 22. Austin initially refused, but on the following episode of Raw is War, he returned to his old ways and hit Stunners on every member of the Alliance, turning face once again. At Invasion, Austin captained the WWF team consisting of himself, Angle, Jericho, and The Undertaker and Kane against the team of WCW's Booker T and Diamond Dallas Page and ECW's Rhyno and The Dudley Boyz. Austin turned heel once again by hitting a Stunner on Angle and helping Team WCW/ECW win the match. Austin subsequently joined the Alliance as their leader.

Austin lost the WWF Championship to Angle at Unforgiven on September 23 by submitting to the ankle lock, ending Austin's reign at 175 days, the longest reign since 1996. He would regain the title on the October 8 episode of Raw, when WWF Commissioner William Regal betrayed Angle and joined the Alliance. Austin then began feuding with Alliance member Rob Van Dam, who was the only member of the Alliance to be cheered by the fans, despite the villainous tactics of the group. Austin faced Angle and Van Dam at No Mercy on October 21 and retained the title by pinning Van Dam. For Survivor Series on November 18, a "winner takes all" 10-man tag team match was announced; Austin captained a team consisting Angle, Shane McMahon, Van Dam, and Booker T, against Team WWF; captained by The Rock, the team also included Jericho, Kane, The Undertaker and Big Show. At Survivor Series, Angle sided with the WWF, helping The Rock to hit the Rock Bottom and pin Austin to win the match, marking the end of the Invasion storyline.

The following night on Raw, Vince McMahon decided he was going to strip Austin of the championship and award it to Angle, before Ric Flair returned and announced he was now co-owner of the WWF. Austin returned moments after this announcement and attacked Angle and McMahon for their actions. He was then handed his championship belt by Flair and celebrated with him in the ring, turning him face once again. At Vengeance on December 9, a tournament was held to unify the WWF Championship and the WCW World Heavyweight Championship, held by The Rock; also involving Angle and Jericho. Austin would defeat Angle, before losing the unification match to Jericho following interference by McMahon and Booker T.

==== Final feuds and retirement (2002–2003) ====
Starting 2002, Austin feuded with the New World Order (nWo), who cost him a match for the Undisputed Championship at No Way Out. Problems were beginning to surface backstage, however, as Austin was unhappy regarding Hulk Hogan's return to the WWF. He was reported as refusing to lose to Hogan in a proposed match between the two at WrestleMania X8 on March 17, while Hogan reportedly told McMahon the same regarding losing to Austin. Austin has also claimed he didn't want the match as he didn't want to wrestle at a slower pace, and that he "didn't think we could deliver". Consequently, Austin faced and defeated Scott Hall at WrestleMania.

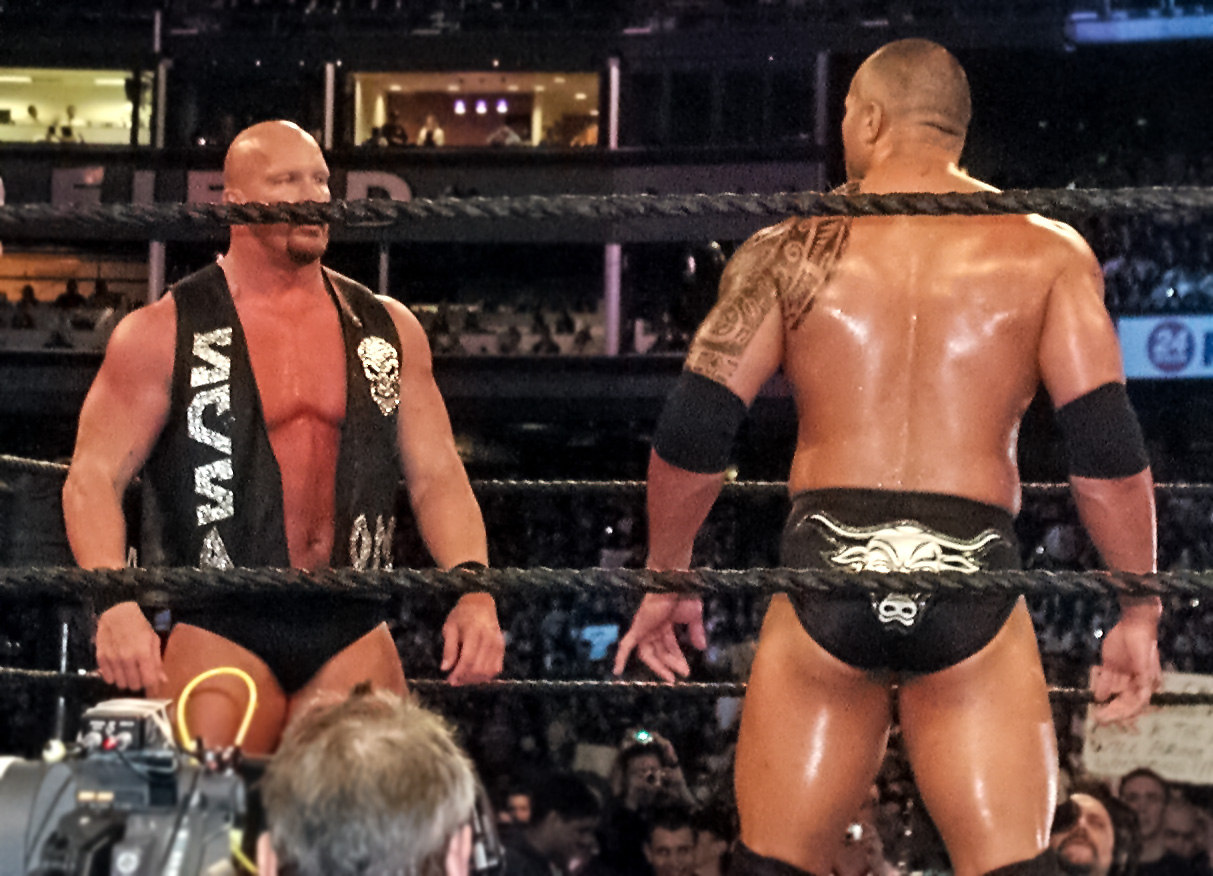
Austin (left) faces off against The Rock at WrestleMania XIX, which was Austin's last match until 2022.

Austin no-showed the Raw after WrestleMania and took a week-long break without the company's consent, citing exhaustion. Austin returned on the April 1 episode of Raw, the first of the new "brand extension" era. The show was centered around which show he would sign with, and he ultimately chose Raw. Austin entered a feud with The Undertaker that resulted in a number-one contender's match for the Undisputed WWF Championship at Backlash on April 21, which Austin lost. In a May interview on WWE's internet program, Byte This!, Austin stunned the company and fans by launching a verbal attack on the direction the company was heading in and slated the creative team for not using him the way he felt they previously did. The WWE rehired Eddie Guerrero for Austin to feud with, while also prepping Austin for a feud with Brock Lesnar. However, Austin balked at the proposition that he lose a King of the Ring qualifying match on Raw to Lesnar, and ultimately walked out of the company. Austin later explained that he thought hot-shotting a rookie made Austin look weak, and airing the match on free television with no build-up did not give Lesnar a proper stage for such a big win over a star of Austin's magnitude. Further fanning the flames among Austin's growing number of detractors was a well-publicized domestic dispute incident between Austin and his wife Debra (see below).

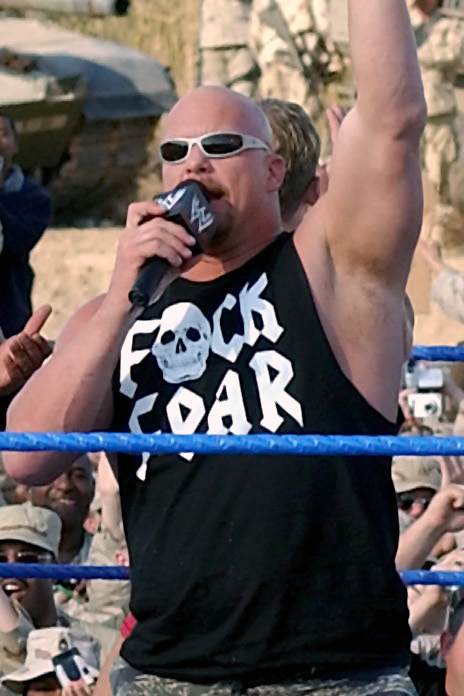
Austin in Iraq, 2003

After Austin again no-showed the June 10 episode of Raw, his storylines were immediately dropped. Austin had walked out of the company again, publicly stating he felt underwhelming storylines were presented to him by the creative team.

For the remainder of 2002, Austin kept a low profile and did not make any public appearances. It was reported, however, by the end of the year, that Austin and McMahon met and resolved their differences. He then agreed to return to the company in early 2003. In an interview with WWE Raw Magazine, he announced deep regret over the situation that led to his departure and the manner in which he had left, and deeper regret over inaccurate speculation regarding his alleged grudges held against other WWE wrestlers, claiming he had no problem with Hall rejoining the company. However, he admitted he still held strong reservations about his singles match with Hall at WrestleMania only lasting seven minutes and felt the build-up to the match did not live up to the expectations of his fans or Hall's, and was angered by speculation suggesting he disagreed with Kevin Nash re-joining the company, insisting he and Nash have always been good friends. He did, however, maintain his displeasure with the storylines and creative changes the WWE had imposed around the time of his departure. In an interview with Vince McMahon on his podcast in 2014, Austin publicly revealed for the first time that McMahon had fined him $650,000 upon his return, but he was able to lower the amount to $250,000.

Austin confessed he had a major rift with Triple H's role in the company upon his return in 2002 but insisted as of 2003, they resolved their issues. Also, he claimed a brief dispute with The Rock was resolved quickly upon his return, and that none of his disputes with the talent roster continued or played the major part in his departure. In February, Austin returned at No Way Out on February 23 by defeating Eric Bischoff. Austin would wrestle only one match between then and WrestleMania, in another short match against Bischoff on Raw. He entered a feud with The Rock, who returned around the same time as a smug, Hollywood sell-out heel. The Rock was offended that the WWE fans voted for Austin in a WWE Magazine poll to determine the 'Superstar of the Decade'. He expressed his frustration at having never defeated Austin at WrestleMania, and challenged Austin to a match at WrestleMania XIX on March 30. Austin was then defeated by The Rock at WrestleMania XIX, in what would be Austin's final match for 19 years.

==== On-screen authority figure (2003–2004) ====
The following month, Linda McMahon brought Austin back to be the co-general manager of the Raw brand, a role he played for the remainder of the year, often getting into physical altercations with talent and personnel. Austin and Bischoff continued to feud over control of the brand. On the July 21 episode of Raw, McMahon informed Austin he could not get physical with anyone unless provoked. At Survivor Series on November 16, Austin's hand-picked team of Booker T, Bubba Ray Dudley, D-Von Dudley, Rob Van Dam and Shawn Michaels faced Bischoff's team of Chris Jericho, Christian, Mark Henry, Randy Orton and Scott Steiner in a 5-on-5 Survivor Series elimination match. Austin's team lost after Batista interfered on behalf of Bischoff. After the match Jonathan Coachman came out to gloat and got beat up by Austin. As a result, Austin was "fired" from his position as co-general manager. Mick Foley took over Austin's former role and began petitioning to have Austin re-instated. Austin returned before the end of 2003, appearing at Tribute to the Troops. He posed as Santa Claus before delivering a "Stone Cold Stunner" to both Vince McMahon and John Cena. Austin returned to Raw on December 29 as its "Sheriff", giving a Stone Cold Stunner to Bischoff and rehiring Michaels, who had just been "fired" by Bischoff. Austin appeared on-and-off as 2004 began, culminating in him being the special guest referee for the Brock Lesnar vs. Goldberg match at WrestleMania XX on March 14. Following the match, Austin attacked both Lesnar and Goldberg with Stone Cold Stunners.

==== Part-time appearances (2005–present) ====
During the following decades, Austin made appearances on WWE programming. He appeared on non-wrestling roles at WrestleMania, WrestleMania 21, 23 (where he was the special guest referee for the match between Bobby Lashley and Umaga known as the Battle of the Billionaries), 25, XXX, 32, 38, and 41. Austin also appeared on the Hall of Fame ceremonies, being inducted in 2009 as singles wrestler and inducting Bret Hart in 2006 and Jim Ross in 2007.

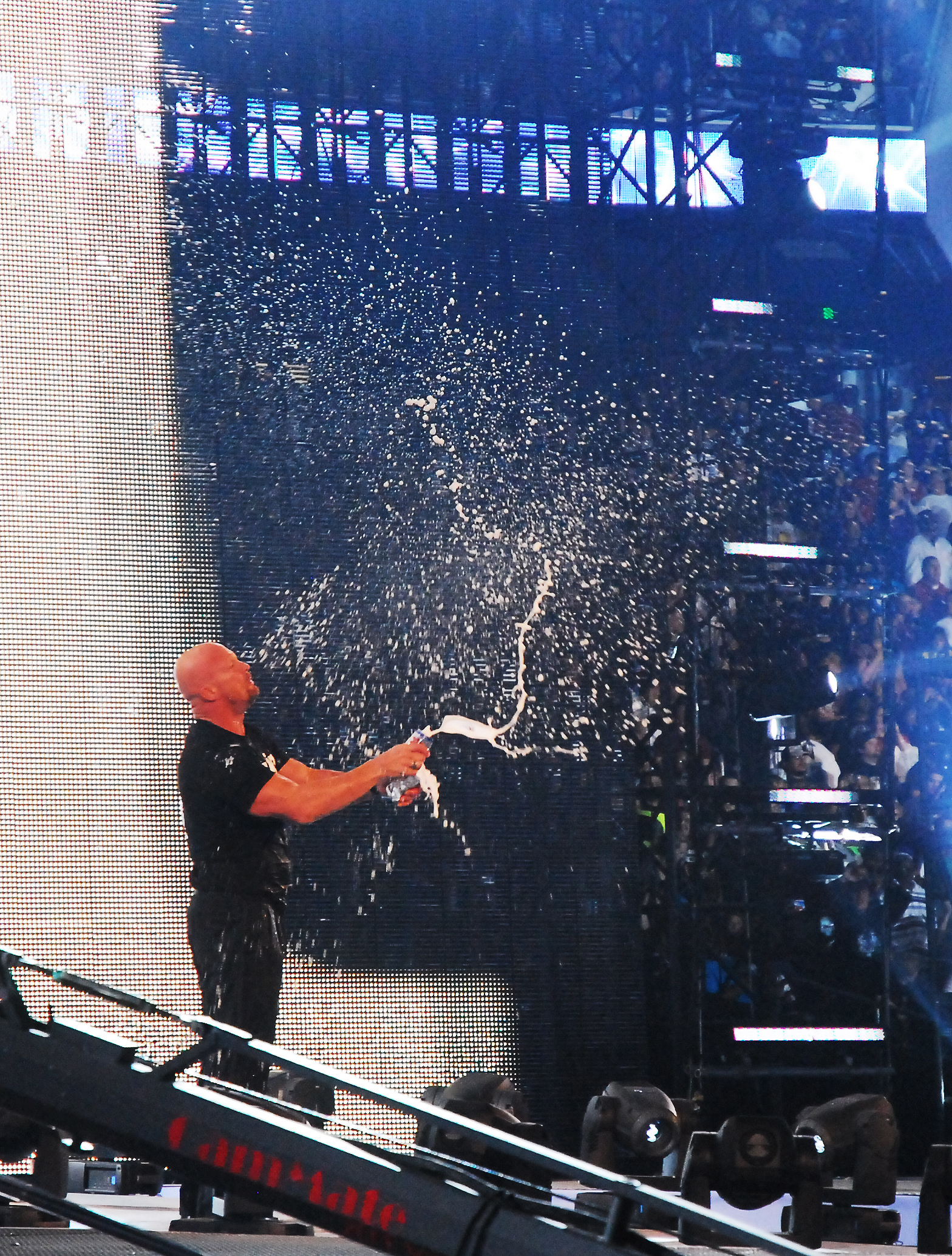
Austin is noted for his signature "beer smash", seen here at WrestleMania 25.

Austin was involved in the concluding segment at ECW One Night Stand on June 12 in which he had a beer bash with the ECW locker room. He also appeared on the internet themed event Cyber Sunday in 2007 and 2008. Austin also made appearances to promote WWE material, like the WWE Films' production The Condemned, the revival of Tough Enough in 2011.

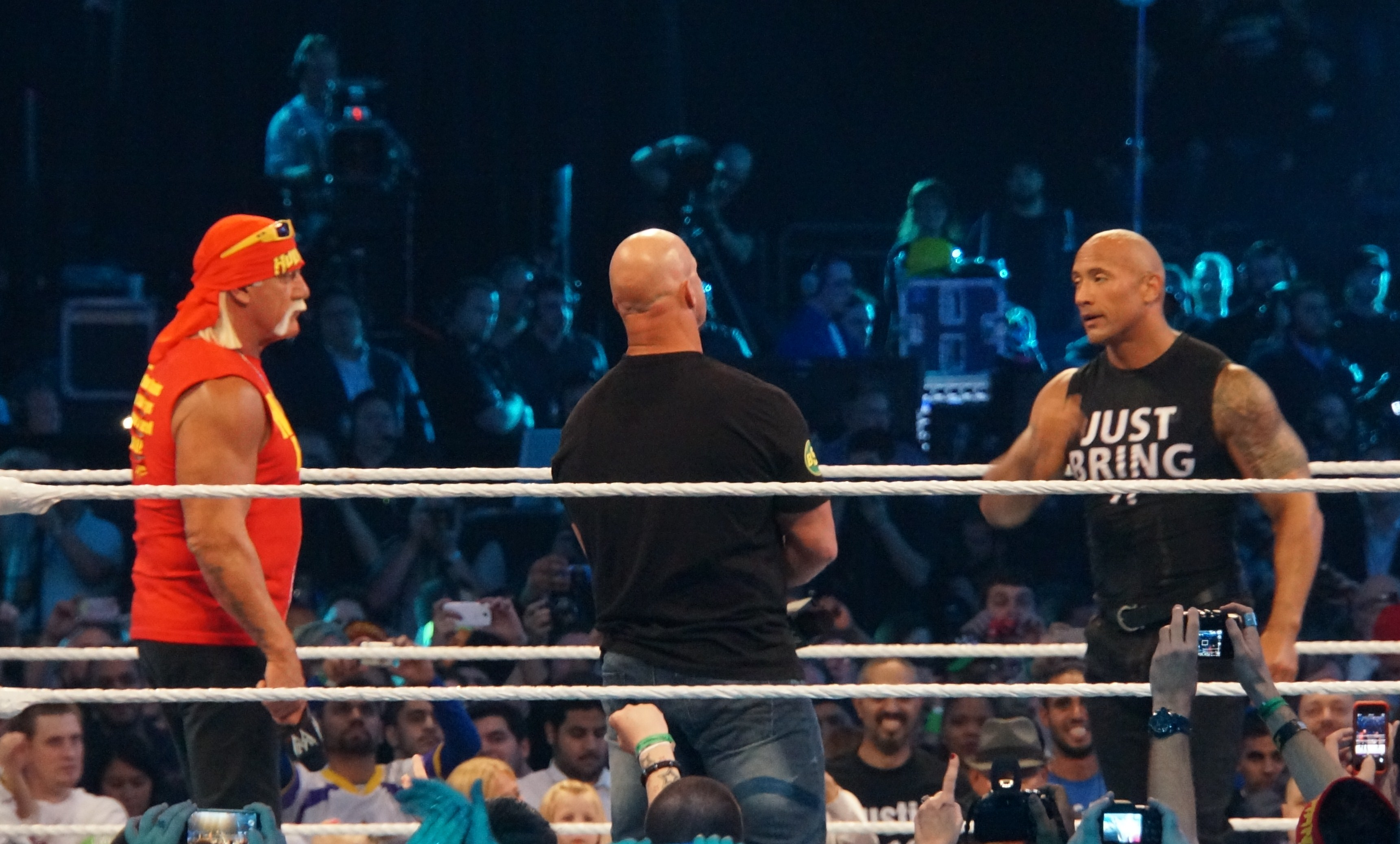
Austin (center) with Hulk Hogan (left) and The Rock at WrestleMania XXX

He also appeared on special episodes, like Raw's 25th anniversary episode and Raw Reunion.

In 2022, Austin had his first feud since his retirement with Kevin Owens. At WrestleMania 38, Austin defeated Owens in a No Holds Barred match, his first match in 19 years.

== Legacy ==
Since his retirement in 2003, Austin has been widely regarded and cited as one of the greatest and most influential professional wrestlers of all time. Sports Illustrated ranked him third on their top 101 greatest wrestlers of all-time list. In 2020, SPORTbible ranked Austin as the greatest wrestler of all time, and the following year in 2021 Bleacher Report also named him the greatest WWE wrestler of all time. He has been described as the most influential wrestler in Raw history, and the poster boy for the Attitude Era. Several former world champions have named Austin as part of their "Mount Rushmore" of wrestling, including The Rock, The Undertaker, Hulk Hogan, Ric Flair, and John Cena, and a 2012 poll conducted by WWE saw Austin picked second on a fan voted version of the concept. When Vince McMahon inducted Austin into the WWE Hall of Fame in 2009, he referred to Austin as "the greatest WWE superstar of all time".

Austin was the biggest box office draw in WWE since Hulk Hogan. His contributions in saving the WWF and winning the Monday Night Wars against WCW helped future superstars like John Cena, who would go onto establish WWE as a global brand. He headlined WrestleMania X-Seven, the first WrestleMania to achieve over 1 million buys. The event was universally acclaimed and is often regarded as the greatest pay-per-view in professional wrestling history. It is also noted as the pinnacle of the Attitude Era, occurring just a week after the WWF bought out their competition, WCW.

During his early years as a wrestler, Austin was a technical wrestler. However, after Owen Hart accidentally injured Austin's neck in 1997, Austin changed his style from technical to brawler. His most famous finishing move is the Stone Cold Stunner, and he credits Michael Hayes with introducing the move to him. Following his retirement, he gave permission to Kevin Owens to use the move as his own finisher, but both have downplayed comparisons between the two. During his time as The Ringmaster, he used the Million Dollar Dream as a finishing move since it was Ted DiBiase's finisher. During his time in WCW, Austin used the Stun Gun (a move innovated by Eddie Gilbert as the Hot Shot) and the Hollywood & Vine (a standing modified figure-four leglock) as his finishers.

Sporting a bald head and goatee, coupled with his ring attire which consisted of plain black trunks and boots, Austin relied solely on his personality to become popular. As "Stone Cold", Austin was portrayed on-screen as an anti-authority rebel who would consistently cuss and defy the company rules and guidelines of WWE Chairman Vince McMahon. One of Austin's taunts during the Attitude Era was to show the middle finger. To complement his persona, Austin was the recipient of two additional nicknames, commentator and real life friend Jim Ross dubbed him "The Texas Rattlesnake" due to the character's "...mannerisms, the motivation, the mindset, you can't trust this son of a bitch", while Austin later named himself "The Bionic Redneck" on account of the injuries he had suffered to his arms, neck and knees. Austin has said he is "eternally indebted" to Ross for helping his character become popular.

On both his podcasts, Austin credited Bret Hart as the wrestler who got him over the most, had most influence on his early wrestling style, and who he had his best matches with. Austin would later go on to induct Bret Hart into the WWE Hall of Fame. The match between Austin and Bret Hart at WrestleMania 13 has been widely regarded as one of the greatest professional wrestling matches of all time, and has been voted by IGN as the greatest match in WrestleMania history, and was number 1 among their list of top 20 WrestleMania matches of all time. The match would later receive the inaugural "Immortal Moment" Award at the 2025 WWE Hall of Fame ceremony.

A 12-minute match between Undertaker and Stone Cold Steve Austin drew a 9.5 rating on June 28, 1999. It stands as the highest-rated segment in Raw history.

According to the data collected by American-bookies, Stone Cold Steve Austin is still WWE's best merchandise seller earning an estimated $3,600,000 from merchandise on WWE Shop site. John Cena takes the #2 spot, earning almost $2,700,000 from WWE Shop. The 'Austin 3:16' T-shirt is among the best selling T-shirts in wrestling history.

In August 2001, Austin began frequently shouting "What?" to interrupt wrestlers who were trying to speak and to initiate fan participation chants. Audiences at WWE shows have since widely chanted the question during performer promos, and Austin has expressed his surprise at the staying power of the chant, stating in a 2011 interview: "it's been interesting!" Austin's entrance theme was composed by Jim Johnston, who said that in composing the song, he looked upon Austin's persona as an "ass-kicker guy who did not enter a room with subtlety. He needed something that reflected that." Looking to capture the unpredictable nature of the character, Johnston thought of using the sounds of a car crash and smashing glass, and recalled that he instantly felt the theme fit the character and that "it felt like it had already been his theme for years". Austin says the song was inspired by Rage Against the Machine's song "Bulls on Parade". The theme song was revamped in 2000, with the rock band Disturbed recording the new version, used for the first time at the Unforgiven PPV event in September. Austin reverted to the 1998 version of his theme song in December 2001, which he still uses to date. Austin's entrance theme is regarded as one of the greatest of all time, and one which defined the Attitude Era.

== Other media ==
=== Video games ===
In April 2026, Austin was revealed to be added to Fortnite. He is the sixth WWE outfit added to the game following -- John Cena, Becky Lynch, Bianca Belair, Cody Rhodes and The Undertaker. Dwayne Johnson appears in the game but not as himself or The Rock but in an acting role using his likeness for the character The Foundation.

=== Acting and hosting ===
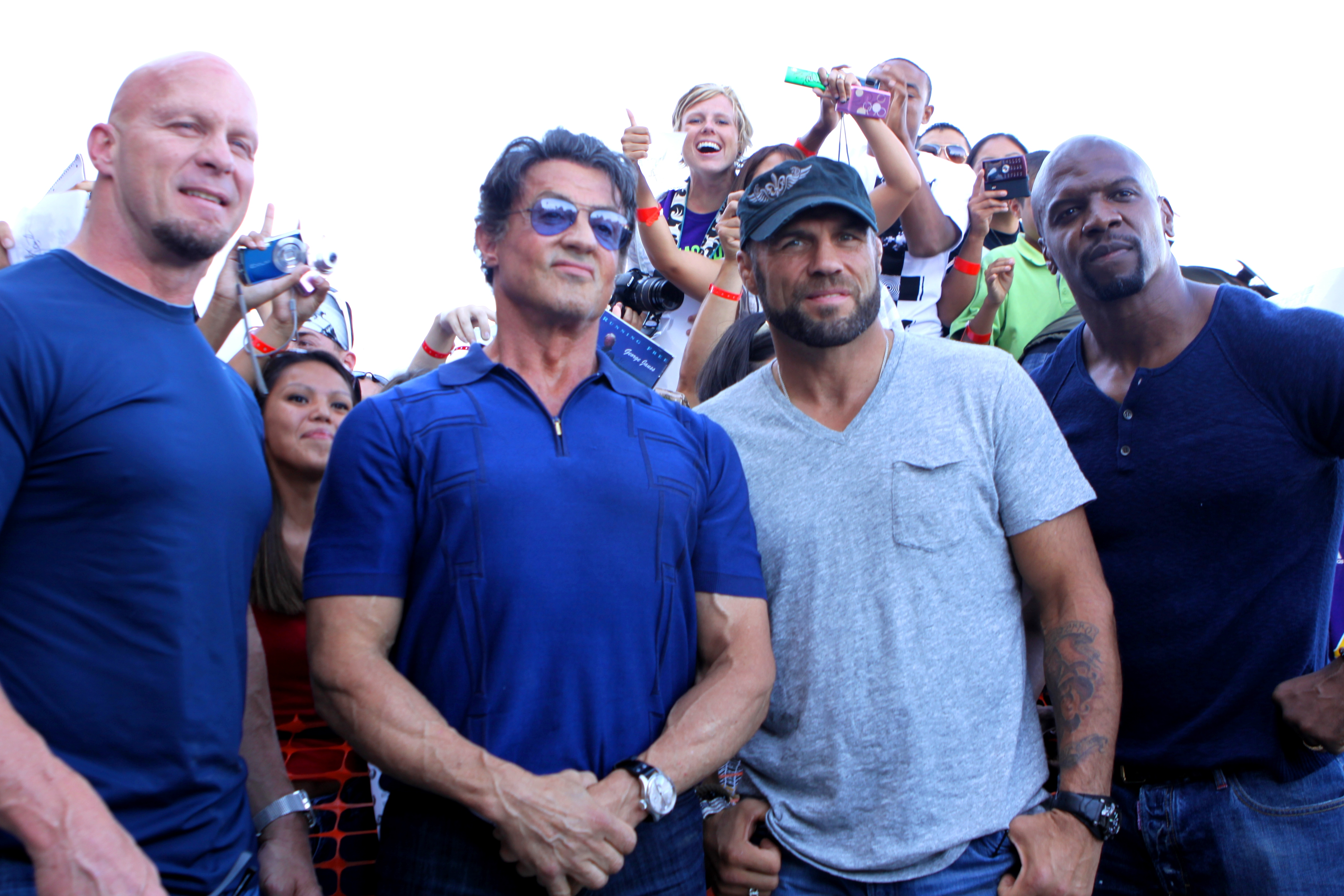
Austin with Sylvester Stallone, Randy Couture and Terry Crews in 2010 at the premiere of The Expendables

Austin had guest roles on Celebrity Deathmatch and Seasons 4 and 5 of CBS's Nash Bridges, where he played San Francisco Police Department Inspector Jake Cage. He has appeared on V.I.P and Dilbert. His motion picture debut was in a supporting role as Guard Dunham in the 2005 remake of The Longest Yard. Austin had his first starring film role, as Jack Conrad, a dangerous convict awaiting execution in a Salvadoran prison, who takes part in an illegal deathmatch game that is being broadcast to the public in the 2007 action film The Condemned. In 2010, Austin appeared in The Expendables as Dan Paine, the right-hand man for the primary antagonist of the film James Munroe, played by Eric Roberts, and bodyguard with Gary Daniels who plays The Brit. Shortly after Austin re-teamed with Eric Roberts and Gary Daniels in Hunt to Kill. It was his last American theatrical release film until 2013. Austin appeared as Hugo Panzer on television series Chuck. He has also starred in Damage, The Stranger, Tactical Force, Knockout, Recoil, Maximum Conviction, and The Package. He made an appearance in Grown Ups 2 and his most recent acting role came in Smosh: The Movie.

In 2011, a documentary was released about Austin's career titled Stone Cold Steve Austin: The Bottom Line on the Most Popular Superstar of All Time. It included interviews with Austin and his and his rivals while covering his most famous matches, promos, and behind-the-scenes moments.

In April 2013, Austin started a weekly podcast named The Steve Austin Show which is family-friendly, while his second podcast The Steve Austin Show – Unleashed! is more adult-oriented. As of May 2015, the podcasts averaged 793,000 downloads a week and had nearly 200 million overall downloads. In February 2018, Austin announced that the "Unleashed" version of the podcast had been dropped and merged with the family-friendly version in order to appeal to more sponsors. The podcast has also transitioned to a live broadcast for the WWE Network (podcasted after a short exclusivity period) with monthly specials since 2014. In November 2019, Austin began an interview segment on the WWE Network called the Broken Skull Sessions, taking its name from the ranch owned by Austin. The premiere episode featured The Undertaker.

Austin hosted the reality competition show Redneck Island on CMT, which began in June 2012 the show would strand a group of contestants, stereotyped as "rednecks", on a deserted island and they compete for food and immunity. It concluded with its fifth season in April 2016. In July 2014, his reality competition show Steve Austin's Broken Skull Challenge premiered on CMT. The show entered into its fifth season in September 2017. Every episode seen a group of eight contestants, either all men or all women, get taken the "Broken Skull Ranch" to compete in a series of physical challenges for a chance at $10,000. Austin later revealed in an interview that it was not filmed at the real Broken Skull Ranch, but an area just outside of Los Angeles designed to represent his ranch.

From 2019 to 2021, Austin hosted Straight Up Steve Austin, the show followed Austin along with celebrity guest travel across the country, swapping stories about their lives and careers the show aired on the USA Network. In 2023, Austin started in another television show titled Stone Cold Takes on America which aired on A&E. The show follows Austin hitting the road, to accept challenges from fans that will push him out of his comfort zone.

In 2024, Austin was the subject of the season 4 episode 7 of Biography: WWE Legends.

=== Publications ===
In 2003, Austin released his autobiography The Stone Cold Truth which was co written alongside Jim Ross. The book goes over his entire life up that point from his childhood in Texas to his to the top of the WWE, while also giving behind the scenes look at Austin what he was going through during his career with him sharing his firsthand experiences.

=== Motorsports career ===
In 2023, Austin began competing in desert racing with a UTV. He co-owns GFI Racing and drives the No. 316 car in reference to his wrestling catchphrase. Austin won the 2024 Valley Off Road Racing Association championship in the Sportsman UTV class before racing the Mint 400 for the first time in 2025, where he was also the grand marshal. On March 26, 2026, Austin won the Stock Mod Pro Class division Prospector 250, which is a six-hour-long race in the Nevada desert.

== Personal life ==
Austin played college football at the University of North Texas. Austin married his high school girlfriend Kathryn Burrhus on November 24, 1990. However, he later pursued a relationship with English wrestling manager Jeanie Clarke, with whom he was working. His marriage to Burrhus was annulled on August 7, 1992, while he was in Japan and he married Clarke on December 18, on his 28th birthday. They had two daughters before divorcing in 1999. Austin also adopted Clarke's daughter from a previous relationship with Chris Adams. Austin's adoptive daughter was married to fellow professional wrestler Adam Bryniarski until his death in 2022.

In 1998, Austin was the recipient of Hamilton, Ontario's "Key to the City", he is one of two people to ever be bestowed the honor, the other being the basketball player Shai Gilgeous-Alexander. That same year on September 1, the city of Lowell, Massachusetts declared that date Stone Cold day along with naming a street after him for the day. The date March 16 is commonly associated with Austin due to the date matching up with his wrestling catchphrase "Austin 3:16".

On September 13, 2000, Austin married wrestling manager Debra Marshall. On June 15, 2002, Marshall called the police to the couple's home. She told officers that Austin had hit her and then stormed out of the house before police arrived. An arrest warrant was issued by the Bexar County district attorney's office on August 12 and Austin turned himself in the following day, at which point he was charged with domestic abuse. He pleaded no contest on November 25, and was given a year's probation, a $1,000 fine, and ordered to carry out 80 hours of community service. In 2007, Marshall told Fox News that WWE knew of the abuse, but worked to keep her from revealing that Austin had hit her as it would cost the company millions of dollars. Austin responded to the incident in 2003 through WWE Raw Magazine, citing his regret over their relationship breaking down and stating his love for Marshall. He also ridiculed allegations that the incident was alcohol-related. He filed for divorce from Marshall on July 22, 2002, which was finalized on February 5, 2003.

In March 2003, during the hours leading up to WrestleMania XIX, Austin was rushed to the hospital for twitchiness and a high heart rate.

In 2003, Austin denied allegations that he was an alcoholic, stating that wrestling fans had mistaken his character's excessive consumption of beer as a real-life trait of his and insisting that he drinks responsibly. In March 2004, he was accused of assaulting his then-girlfriend Tess Broussard during a dispute at his home in San Antonio, Texas, according to a police report. No arrests were made and no charges were filed in the case.

In 2007, the Wrestling Observer newsletter reported that Austin had legally changed his name to Steve Austin.

In late 2009, Austin married his fourth wife, Kristin Feres.

In 2014, Austin voiced support for same-sex marriage on his podcast. Also in 2014, Austin released his first beer, Broken Skull IPA, with El Segundo Brewing Company in California. In March 2022, they released another collaboration, Broken Skull American Lager. The beers are distributed in 39 states with El Segundo brewing over 5,000 barrels of Broken Skull annually.

Austin has owned three ranches: the Broken Skull Ranch was near Tilden, Texas and the Broken Skull Ranch 2.0 in Gardnerville, Nevada. Austin is a fan of the Dallas Cowboys as well as the Alabama Crimson Tide.

== Filmography ==
Film
Year	Title	Role	Notes
1999	Beyond The Mat	Himself	Documentary
2005	The Longest Yard	Guard Dunham	
2007	The Condemned	Jack Conrad / Jack Riley	
2009	Damage	John Brickner	Direct-to-video
2010	The Expendables	Dan Paine	
2010	The Stranger	Tom "The Stranger" Tomashevsky	Direct-to-video
2010	Hunt to Kill	U.S. Border Patrol Agent Jim Rhodes	Direct-to-video
2010	Whoop Ass	Himself	Short film
2011	Recoil	Ryan Varrett	Direct-to-video
2011	Knockout	Dan Barnes	Direct-to-video
2011	Tactical Force	SWAT Captain Frank Tate	Direct-to-video
2012	Maximum Conviction	Manning	Direct-to-video
2013	The Package	Tommy Wick	Direct-to-video
2013	Grown Ups 2	Tommy Cavanaugh	
2014	Chain of Command	Ray Peters	Direct-to-video
2015	Smosh: The Movie	Himself	

Television
Year	Title	Role	Notes
1998	V.I.P.	Himself	
1998–2002	Celebrity Deathmatch	Himself	Voice
1999–2000	Nash Bridges	Inspector Jake Cage	Recurring role, 6 episodes
2000	Dilbert	Himself	Voice; Episode "The Delivery"
2003	Hollywood Squares	Himself	5 Episodes
2005	The Bernie Mac Show	Himself	
2010	Chuck	Hugo Panzer	2 episodes
2011	Tough Enough	Himself	Host and TV wrestling trainer
2012–2016	Redneck Island	Himself	Host
2014–2017	Steve Austin's Broken Skull Challenge	Himself	Host
2019–2021	Straight Up Steve Austin	Himself	Host
2020	Undertaker: The Last Ride	Himself	Documentary series
2023	Stone Cold Takes on America	Himself	Host
2023	WWE's Most Wanted Treasures	Himself	1 Episode

Podcast
Year	Title	Role	Notes
2019–2022	The Broken Skull Sessions	Himself	

== Music videos ==
Music videos
Year	Title	Role	Notes
2019	¿Quién tu eres?	Himself	Music video debut

== Video games ==
Video games
Year	Title	Notes
1994	WCW: The Main Event	Video game debut
1998	WWF War Zone	WWF/E Video game debut; cover athlete
1999	WWF Attitude	Cover athlete
1999	WWF WrestleMania 2000	
2000	WWF SmackDown!	
2000	WWF Royal Rumble	Cover athlete
2000	WWF No Mercy	
2000	WWF SmackDown! 2: Know Your Role	
2001	WWF With Authority!	
2001	WWF Betrayal	
2001	WWF Road to WrestleMania	Cover athlete
2001	WWF SmackDown! Just Bring It	
2002	WWF Raw	
2002	WWE WrestleMania X8	Cover athlete
2002	WWE SmackDown! Shut Your Mouth	
2003	WWE Crush Hour	
2003	WWE WrestleMania XIX	Cover athlete
2003	WWE Raw 2	
2003	WWE SmackDown! Here Comes the Pain	
2005	WWE Day of Reckoning 2	
2005	WWE SmackDown! vs. Raw 2006	
2006	WWE SmackDown vs. Raw 2007	
2007	WWE SmackDown vs. Raw 2008	
2009	WWE SmackDown vs. Raw 2010	DLC
2009	WWE Legends of WrestleMania	Cover athlete
2010	WWE SmackDown vs. Raw 2011	
2011	WWE All Stars	
2011	WWE '12	
2012	WWE WrestleFest	
2012	WWE '13	
2013	WWE 2K14	
2014	WWE SuperCard	
2014	WWE 2K15	
2015	WWE Immortals	
2015	WWE 2K16	Cover athlete
2016	WWE 2K17	
2017	WWE Champions	
2017	WWE Tap Mania	
2017	WWE 2K18	
2017	WWE Mayhem	
2018	WWE 2K19	
2019	WWE 2K20	
2020	WWE 2K Battlegrounds	Cover athlete
2022	WWE 2K22	
2023	WWE 2K23	
2024	WWE 2K24	
2025	WWE 2K25	
2026	WWE 2K26	
2026	Fortnite	

== Championships and accomplishments ==
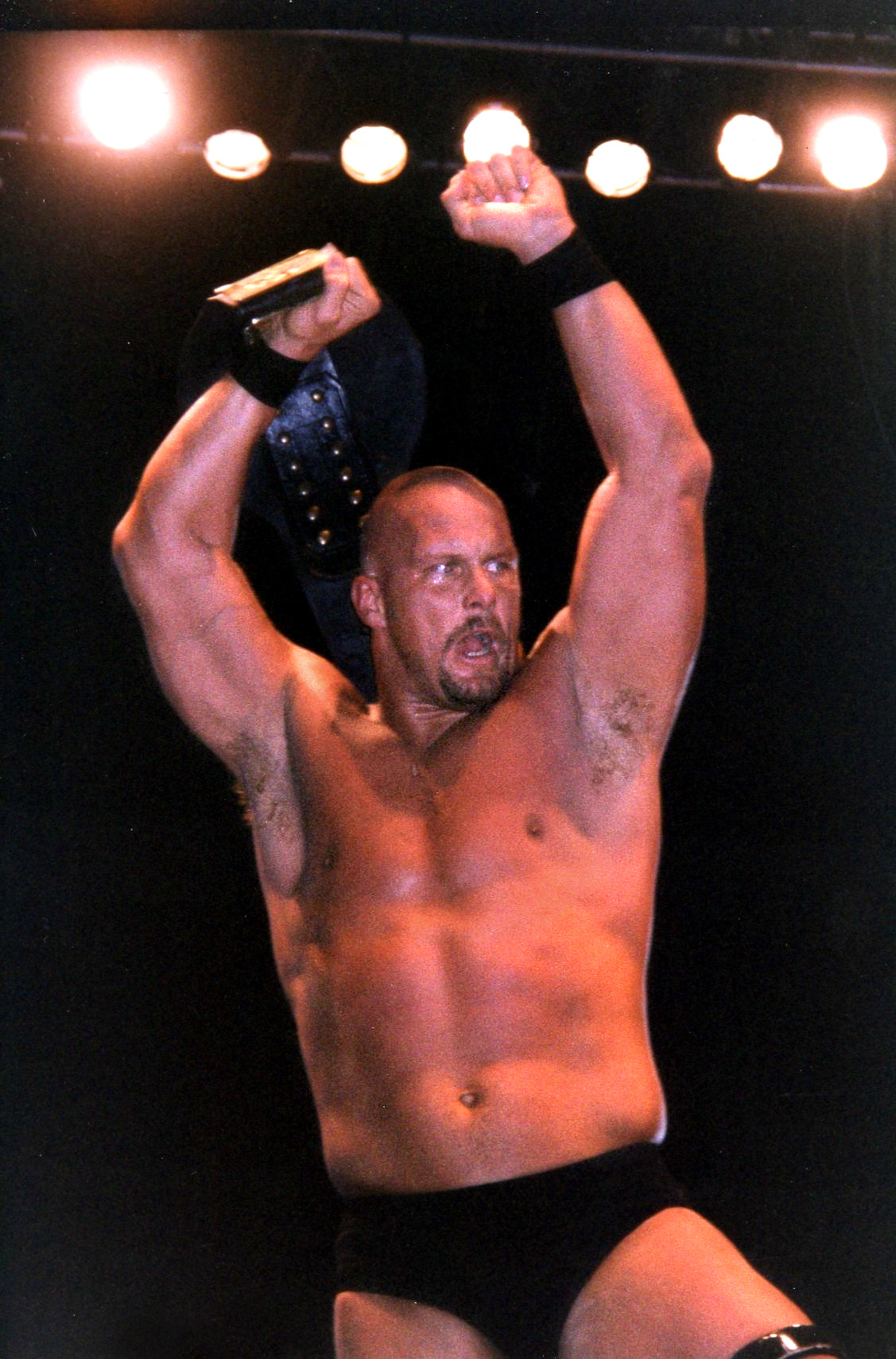
Austin is a six-time WWF Champion

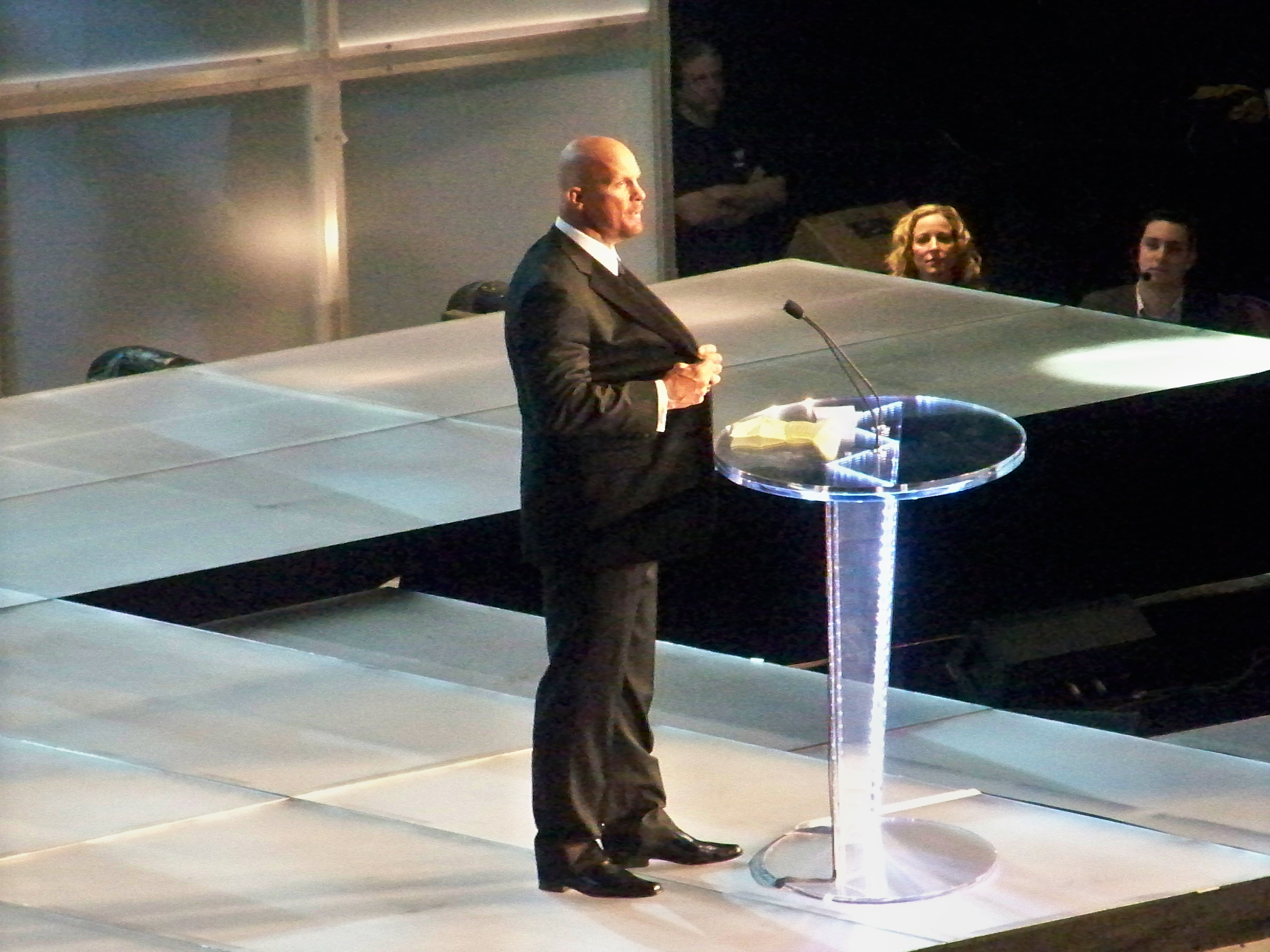
Austin was inducted into the WWE Hall of Fame (class of 2009).

- Cauliflower Alley Club
  - Iron Mike Mazurki Award (2012)
- Guinness World Records
  - World record: Most wins of the WWE Royal Rumble (3 times)
- International Professional Wrestling Hall of Fame
  - Class of 2022
- Teen Choice Awards
  - Won Choice Pro Wrestler (1999)
  - Nominated for Choice Movie: Rumble with Bob Sapp in The Longest Yard (2005)
- Pro Wrestling Illustrated
  - Feud of the Year (1998, 1999) vs. Vince McMahon
  - Match of the Year (1997) vs. Bret Hart in a submission match at WrestleMania 13
  - Most Hated Wrestler of the Year (2001)
  - Most Popular Wrestler of the Year (1998)
  - Rookie of the Year (1990)
  - Wrestler of the Year (1998, 1999, 2001)
  - Ranked No. 1 of the top 500 singles wrestlers in the PWI 500 in 1998 and 1999
  - Ranked No. 19 of the top 500 singles wrestlers of the PWI Years in 2003
  - Ranked No. 50 of the top 100 tag teams of the PWI Years with Brian Pillman in 2003
  - Stanley Weston Award (2019)
- Professional Wrestling Hall of Fame
  - Class of 2016
- Sports Illustrated
  - Ranked No. 1 of the 20 Greatest WWE Wrestlers Of All Time
- Texas Wrestling Alliance
  - TWA Tag Team Championship (1 time) – with Rod Price
- World Championship Wrestling
  - WCW World Television Championship (2 times)
  - WCW United States Heavyweight Championship (2 times)
  - WCW World Tag Team Championship (1 time) – with Brian Pillman
  - NWA World Tag Team Championship (1 time) – with Brian Pillman
- World Wrestling Federation/World Wrestling Entertainment/WWE
  - WWF Championship (6 times)
  - WWF Intercontinental Championship (2 times)
  - WWF Tag Team Championship (4 times) – with Shawn Michaels (1), Dude Love (1), The Undertaker (1), and Triple H (1)
  - Million Dollar Championship (1 time)
  - King of the Ring (1996)
  - Royal Rumble (1997, 1998, 2001)
  - Undisputed WWF Championship #1 Contenders Tournament (2002)
  - Fifth Triple Crown Champion
  - Slammy Award (2 times)
    - Freedom of Speech (1997)
    - Best Original WWE Network Show – Stone Cold Podcast (2015)
  - WWE Hall of Fame (2 times)
    - Class of 2009 – individually
    - Class of 2025 – Immortal Moment vs. Bret Hart at WrestleMania 13
- Wrestling Observer Newsletter
  - Best Box Office Draw (1998, 1999)
  - Best Brawler (2001)
  - Best Gimmick (1997, 1998)
  - Best Heel (1996)
  - Best on Interviews (1996–1998, 2001)
  - Best Non-Wrestler (2003)
  - Feud of the Year (1997) vs. The Hart Foundation
  - Feud of the Year (1998, 1999) vs. Vince McMahon
  - Match of the Year (1997) vs. Bret Hart in a submission match at WrestleMania 13
  - Most Charismatic (1997, 1998)
  - Rookie of the Year (1990)
  - Tag Team of the Year (1993) with Brian Pillman as The Hollywood Blonds
  - Worst Worked Match of the Year (1991) with Terrance Taylor vs. Bobby Eaton and P. N. News in a Scaffold match at The Great American Bash
  - Wrestler of the Year (1998)
  - Wrestling Observer Newsletter Hall of Fame (Class of 2000)
- Other honors
  - Gifted Hamilton, Ontario's "Key to the City", in 1998
  - Stone Cold Steve Austin declared in Lowell, Massachusetts on September 1, 1998
  - Wharton County Junior College Athletics Hall of Fame (class of 2022)

== Bibliography ==
- Sammond, Nicholas (2005). Steel Chair to the Head: The Pleasure and Pain of Professional Wrestling. Duke University Press. ISBN 978-0-8223-3438-5.
- Foley, Mick (2000). Have A Nice Day: A Tale of Blood and Sweat Socks. Harper Collins. ISBN 978-0-06-103101-4.
- PSI Staff (2007). Pro Wrestling Illustrated Presents: 2007 Wrestling Almanac & Book of Facts. Kappa Publishing.
- Austin, Steve; Ross, Jim; Brent, Dennis (2003). The Stone Cold Truth. Pocket Books. ISBN 978-0-7434-7720-8.
