= Boussard =

Boussard is a surname. Notable people with the name include:

- Hervé Boussard (1966–2013), French cyclist
- Vincent Boussard (born 1969), French opera and theatre director

== See also ==
- Boussart, surname
- Broussard, surname
- Bussard, surname
