= Boussart =

Boussart is a surname. Notable people with the surname include:

- André Joseph Boussart (1758–1813), French soldier and general
- Caroline Boussart (1808–1891), Belgian writer

== See also ==
- Boussard, surname
