= Lady Chatterley's Stories =

- Created by: Polly Quennel
- Starring: Shauna O'Brien
- Country of origin: United States
- No. of episodes: 17

Production
- Running time: 0:25
- Production company: MRG Entertainment

Original release
- Network: Showtime
- Release: 2000 – April 21, 2001

Lady Chatterley's Stories is an erotic softcore TV show that aired on Showtime which ran for two seasons.

== Premise ==
The show featured Shauna O'Brien as Lady Constance Chatterley, a land broker by day and at night a sexual psychiatrist to her friends and exclusive clients inside her secluded mansion. Constance is known for her taste for the sexually exotic and the ability to take an unflinching look into the sex lives of her and her clients and friends. Each episode treats the viewer to a provocative and arousing story punctuated by highly charged erotic sequences.

The series featured other notable softcore stars, including Kim Dawson, Holly Sampson, Veronica Hart, Susan Featherly, Tess Broussard, Shannan Leigh and Gabriella Hall.

The show's title is derived from Lady Chatterley's Lover, a classic and controversial romance-erotic novel by D. H. Lawrence, first published in 1928.

== Episode list ==
1. "A Real Man"
2. "Does He Have a Brother?"
3. "Secrets"
4. "Substance of Desire"
5. "Fantasy"
6. "Satisfaction"
7. "The Manuscript"
8. "The Wager"
9. "One Night Stand"
10. "Passion"
11. "Switch"
12. "The Husband"
13. "A Few Moments in Time"
14. "Before and After"
15. "Mystery Lover"
