= Émile Broussard =

French cyclist (born 1895)

Emile Broussard
Personal information
- Born: 5 February 1895

Cycling career
- Sport: Cycling
- Discipline: Road
- Role: Rider

Emile Broussard (born 5 February 1895, date of death unknown) was a French racing cyclist. He rode in the 1924 Tour de France.
