= Joseph Eloi Broussard =

American rice mill owner (1866–1956)

Joseph Eloi Broussard (December 16, 1866 – October 6, 1956) was a pioneer rice grower and miller in southeast Texas. He was born and grew up near Beaumont, Texas. In 1892 he converted a grist mill into the Beaumont Rice Mill, the first commercially successful rice mill in the state of Texas. He also established an irrigation company (later absorbed by the Lower Neches Valley Authority) to create an irrigation system to support rice agriculture.

As a result of his work, the cultivation of rice expanded from 1500 acres locally in 1892 to 400,000 acres in 23 Texas counties by the time of Broussard's death. His leadership and landholdings resulted in rice being cultivated in peak years on some 40,000 acres in the local area.

As the mill processed rice, it helped rice become an important commodity crop of the early residents of Beaumont. Broussard also raised cattle on his property, and harvesting lumber was important in the region.

== Early life and education ==
Joseph Eloi Broussard was born on December 16, 1866, to Eloi and Mary Azema (Hébert) Broussard in Beaumont, Texas, a farming and lumber area. His maternal grandfather was of French Creole descent and had migrated to Texas from Louisiana, and could trace back to exiles from Acadia. He also was related to James Polk through his mother. His father's family was also of French ancestry, and he was raised as Roman Catholic.

After his father died when Joseph was young, his mother remarried to Lovan Hamshire. They lived on his ranch near present-day Hamshire, Texas. Young Joseph studied for three years at an academy in Galveston, then began working with cattle and as a postal rider in Jefferson County, Texas.

== Career ==
In 1885 Broussard was named at the age of 19 as the first postmaster of a local post office. He named it La Belle for his fiancée, Mary Belle Bordages. Broussard and Mary Belle Bordages married in 1889 and had nine children together.

Her father Phillip Bordages (c. 1840 – 1891) was born in France and immigrated to New Orleans at the age of 18. He settled in Jefferson County, Texas, where he became a farmer and merchant. He married Ellen Elliott (1846–1889) and they had six children together. The Bordages parents are buried in the Broussard Cemetery southwest of Beaumont.

A few years later Broussard bought a one-third interest in a gristmill in Beaumont. In 1891 he founded the Beaumont Irrigation Company with a rice irrigation and canal system, the first in the state, to support rice culture in the area. In 1892 he converted his mill to a rice mill, the first commercially successful one in the state of Texas. At that time, farmers in the county had 1500 acres in rice. Broussard was instrumental in establishing the rice industry and this product as a commodity crop in Texas.

Rice cultivation expanded. By 1903, Texas farmers "planted 234,000 acres of rice compared to Louisiana's 376,000 acres. The two states then produced 99 percent of the total rice crop, with production having virtually ceased in South Carolina and Georgia."

In peak years under Broussard's management, local farms had 40,000 acres in rice. The irrigation company became institutionalized in 1933 when established by the state legislature as the Lower Neches Valley Authority.

Broussard also encouraged rice farmers to organize, serving as president of the Rice Millers' and Dealers' Association (the forerunner of the current Rice Millers' Association of America), from 1907 to 1918. During the early years, he traveled with a team to Europe to market his area's rice.

By the time of Broussard's death on October 6, 1956, rice was being cultivated on 400,000 acres in 23 counties in Texas. By the 1980s, his grandson was running the rice mill.

Broussard's daughter, Rita Estelle Broussard (1900–2003), was a pianist and music teacher.

== Legacy and honors ==
- The 1950 International Rice Festival at Crowley, Louisiana, was dedicated to Broussard.
- Broussard was knighted as an exemplary Catholic in 1938 by Pope Pius XI.
