= Jan Hendrik Brussaard =

Dutch sports shooter (1899–1969)

Personal information
- Born: 2 October 1899 Rotterdam, Netherlands
- Died: 4 May 1969 (aged 69) Zeist, Netherlands

Sport
- Sport: Sports shooting

Jan Hendrik Brussaard (2 October 1899 – 4 May 1969) was a Dutch sports shooter. He competed at the 1936 Summer Olympics and 1948 Summer Olympics.
