= Bussard =

Bussard is a surname. Notable people with the surname include:

- Joe Bussard (1936–2022), American collector of 78-rpm records
- Ray Bussard (1928–2010), swimming coach
- Robert W. Bussard (1928–2007), American physicist
- Robin Bussard (born 2002), Swiss ski mountaineer
- Thomas Bussard (born 2002), Swiss ski mountaineer

== See also ==
- Boussard, surname
- Bussard ramjet, a theoretical form of spacecraft propulsion
