= Tess Broussard =

American actress, model, and media personality

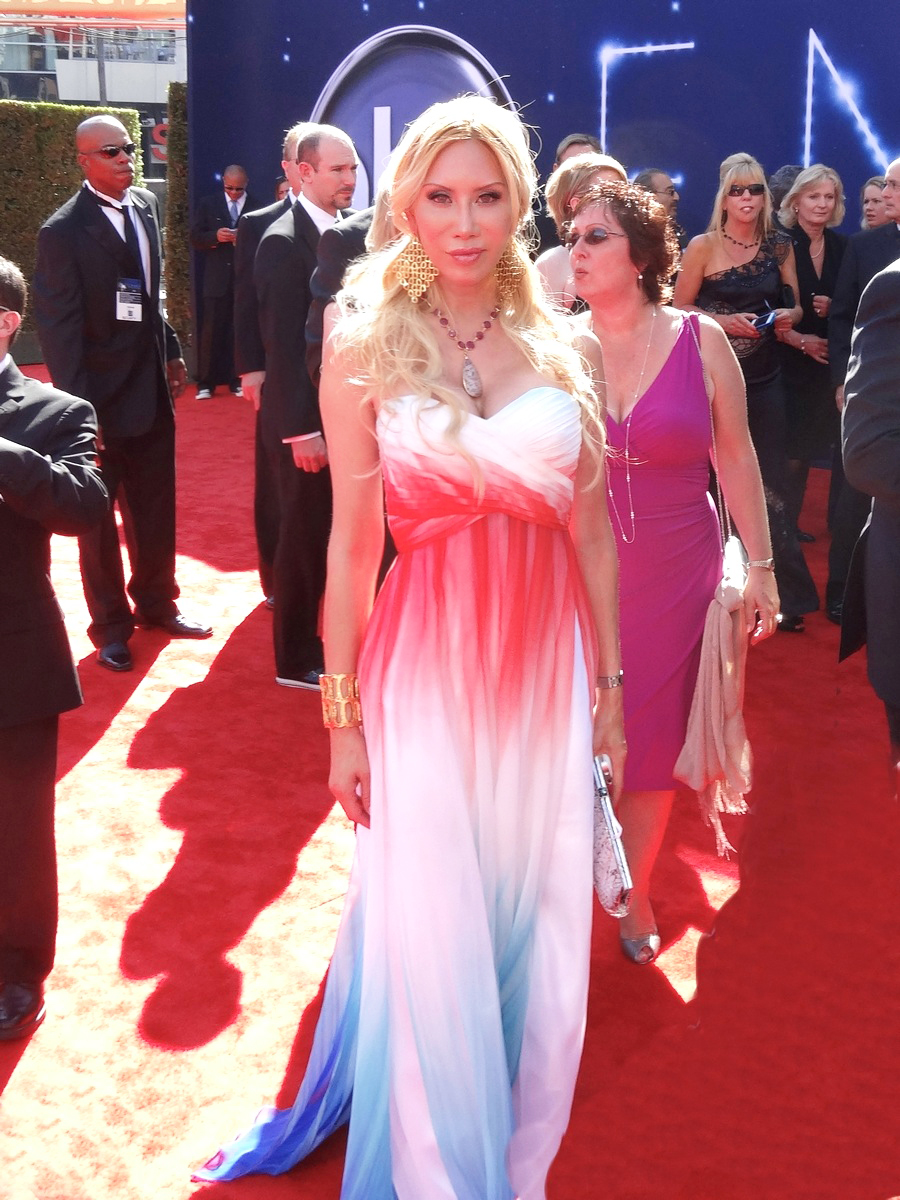
- Broussard at the Emmy Awards 2012
- Born: Dallas, Texas, United States
- Occupation: Actress · Model · Media personality
- Years active: 1995–present

Brenda Tess Broussard is an American actress, glamour model, and media personality.

== Career ==
While attending Pepperdine University, Broussard was acting and modeling. Broussard worked as a spokesmodel, calendar model and poster model for several Fortune 500 companies such as Harley Davidson, Sony, and Budweiser. She booked her first national commercial - a GMC truck commercial during her junior year. She also worked as a spokesmodel for E3 (Electronic Entertainment Expo) video game conventions in Los Angeles for the company THQ from 1997 to 2003 and as a Cadillac spokesmodel from 2001 to 2003. Broussard was also a fitness/swimwear model as well as a Playboy model and FHM model.

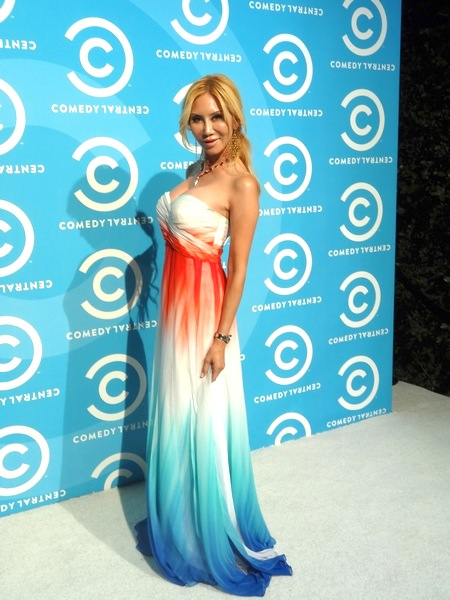
Emmy Awards Comedy Central party 2012

Broussard appeared in many hip hop music videos such as a dancer in Will Smith's "Gettin' Jiggy Wit It" (1997), lead girl in South Park's "Kenny's Dead" by Master P (1999), and a girl wrestler in Warren G and Ron Isley's Smokin' Me Out (1997).

Broussard's first big break in television was being cast in Saban Entertainment's action children show VR Troopers as the Pink Vixen. Besides starring in the action genre, Broussard also co-starred in comedy television shows like The Jamie Foxx Show: Hot Coco on a Cold Night (2000), and has made hosting appearances on the Extreme Gong Show (1999). Another action film Broussard appeared in was Supreme Champion (2010) and she co-starred in the action/comedy movie Secret Agent 420 (2005). She has starred in several HBO and Cinemax movies. In 2012, Broussard was featured in the sketch comedy show The Eric Andre Show. In 2013, Broussard had a recurring TV role in Teens Wanna Know. Parlaying more into comedy, she worked as a returning co-star on Comedy Central's Kroll Show from 2012 to 2015.

Along with acting, Broussard in 2012-2013 became a co-host and celebrity reporter for the weekly radio podcast of The John and Dave Show in LA, an entertainment, sports talk show.

In 2014, Broussard performed in a recurring role in the ABC comedy Irreversible starring David Schwimmer.

== Charity work ==
Broussard is actively involved with charity work ranging from animal rescue to aiding the homeless as well as children in need. From 2003 to the present, she has volunteered at The Bill Foundation animal rescue and adopted her dog Salvador Dalí there. In 2012, she also appeared and spoke at SPCALA celebrity events to help acquire donations, blankets and toys for the rescue animals. She is also involved with the St. Vincent de Paul Society to help the homeless in Los Angeles. In early March, Broussard participated in a celebrity PSA - My Hope For Children. In 2012 to present, Broussard volunteered for California Highway Patrol "Toys for Tots" during the holidays to give out gifts to families in need. 2013 to present, Broussard volunteers at Dogs without Borders, a dog rescue in Los Angeles.

== Filmography ==
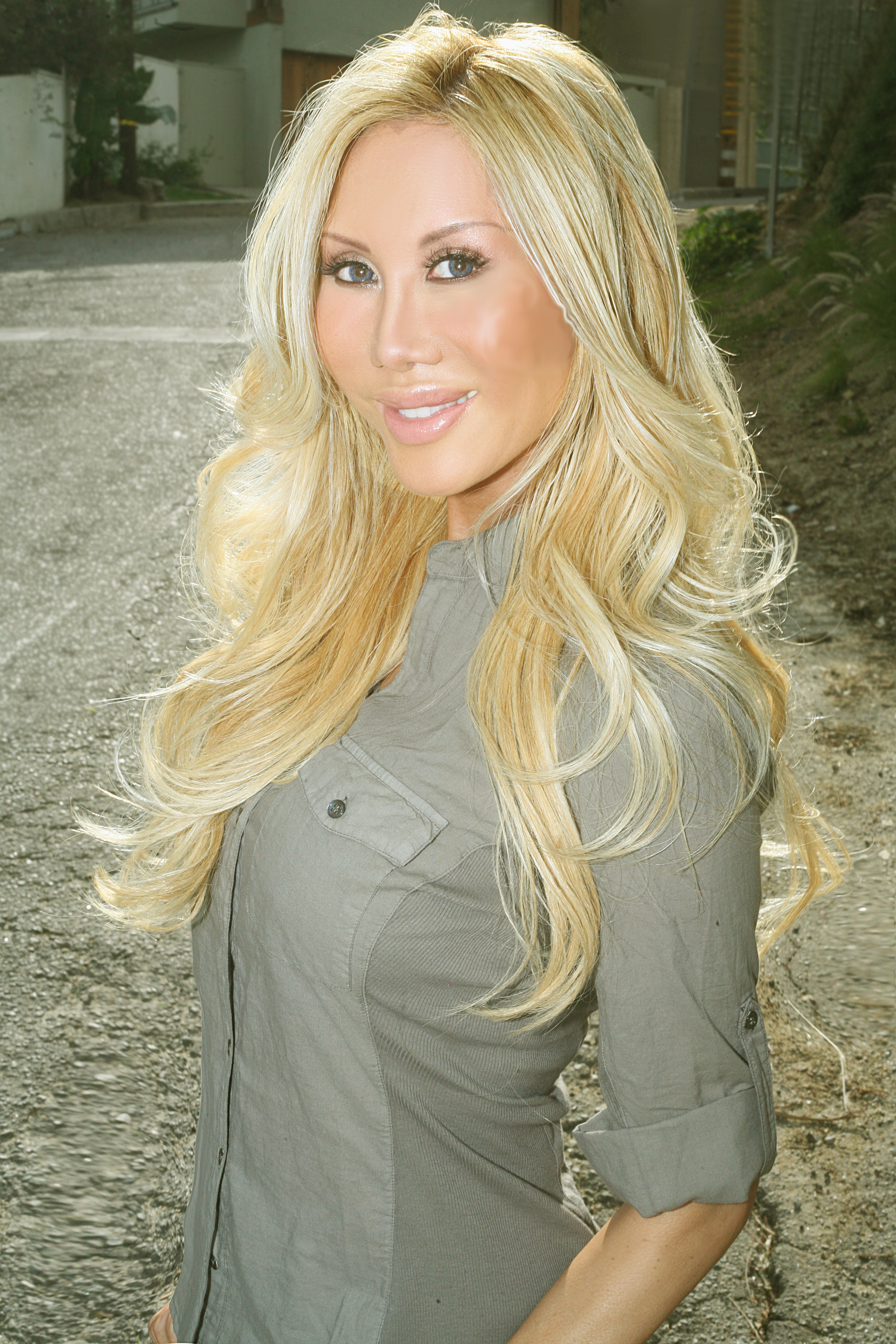
Tess Broussard in Los Angeles, 2010

- Irreversible (2014)
- Teens Wanna Know (2013)
- Kroll Show (2012–2015)
- The Eric Andre Show (2012)
- Supreme Champion (2010)
- Secret Agent 420 (2005)
- Survivors Exposed (2001)
- Sunstorm (2001)
- Dying on the Edge (2001)
- Lady Chatterley's Stories Episode #2.11, "Before and After" (2001)
- Resurrection Blvd. (2000)
- Luck of the Draw (2000)
- The Jamie Foxx Show (2000)
- Extreme Gong Show 1999 Episode #1.88 (1999)
- V.R. Troopers (1995)
