= Roger Corman filmography =

Films directed or produced by Roger Corman

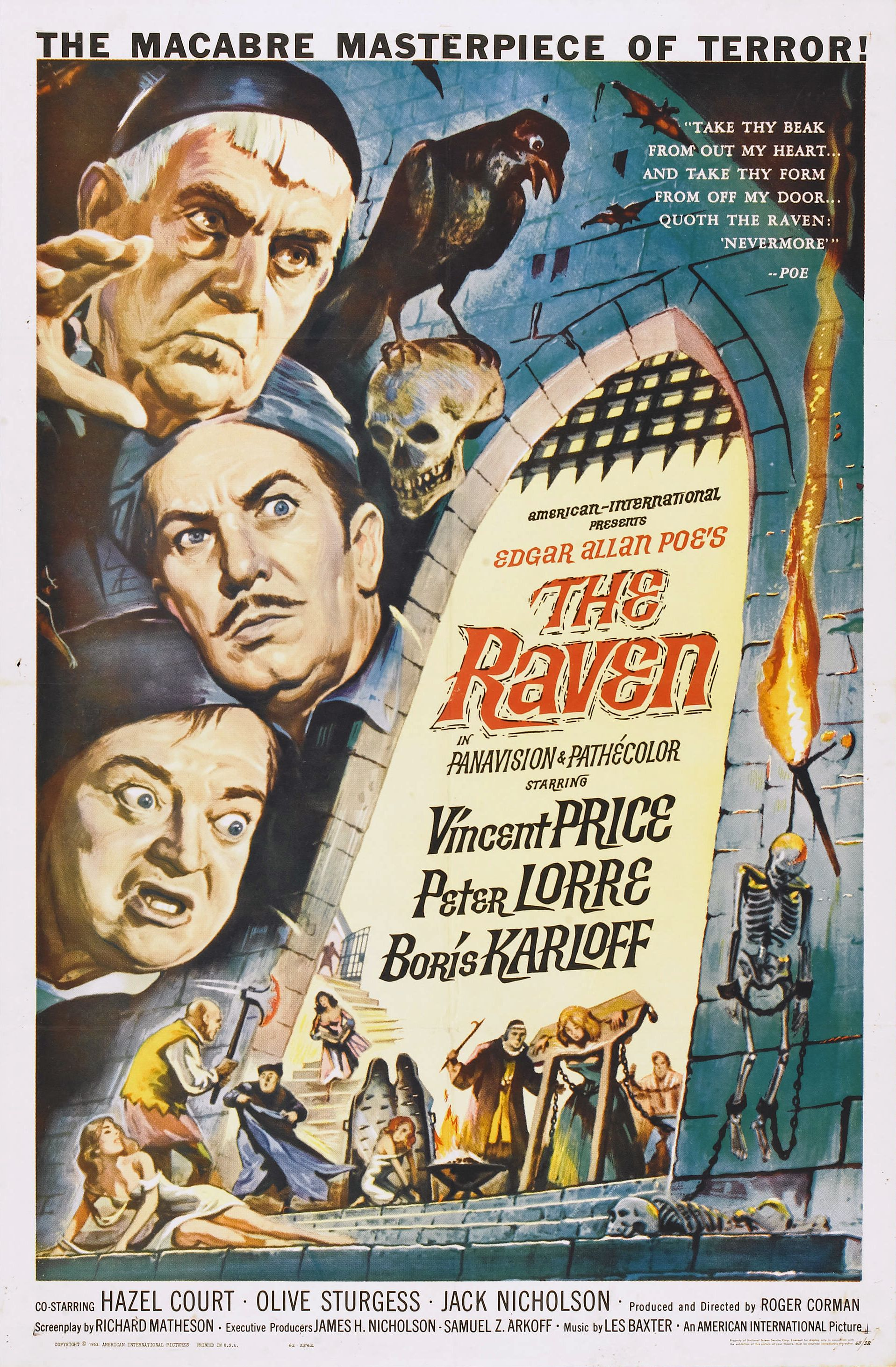
Poster for Corman-directed The Raven, 1963

Roger Corman (April 5, 1926 – May 9, 2024) was an American film director and producer. Known under various monikers such as "The Pope of Pop Cinema", “King of the Beatnik Movies”, "The Spiritual Godfather of the New Hollywood", and "The King of Cult", he was known as a trailblazer in the world of independent film.

Corman was famously prolific, both in his American International Pictures years and afterward. The IMDb credits Corman with 55 directed films and some 385 produced films from 1954 through 2008, many as un-credited producer or executive producer (consistent with his role as head of his own New World Pictures from 1970 through 1983). Many of the features directed or produced by Corman were low-budget films that later attracted a cult following. Corman also has significant credits as writer and actor.

== Film ==
| Year | Title | Director | Producer | Notes |
|---|---|---|---|---|
| 1955 | Five Guns West | Yes | Yes | |
| 1955 | Apache Woman | Yes | Yes | |
| 1955 | Day the World Ended | Yes | Yes | |
| 1956 | Swamp Women | Yes | Yes | |
| 1956 | The Oklahoma Woman | Yes | Yes | |
| 1956 | It Conquered the World | Yes | Yes | |
| 1956 | Gunslinger | Yes | Yes | Original idea |
| 1957 | Naked Paradise | Yes | Yes | |
| 1957 | Not of This Earth | Yes | Yes | |
| 1957 | Attack of the Crab Monsters | Yes | Yes | |
| 1957 | Rock All Night | Yes | Yes | |
| 1957 | The Undead | Yes | Yes | |
| 1957 | Teenage Doll | Yes | Yes | |
| 1957 | Carnival Rock | Yes | Yes | |
| 1957 | Sorority Girl | Yes | Yes | |
| 1958 | The Saga of the Viking Women and Their Voyage to the Waters of the Great Sea Serpent | Yes | Yes | |
| 1958 | War of the Satellites | Yes | Yes | |
| 1958 | Machine-Gun Kelly | Yes | Yes | |
| 1958 | She Gods of Shark Reef | Yes | No | |
| 1958 | Teenage Caveman | Yes | No | |
| 1959 | I Mobster | Yes | Yes | |
| 1959 | A Bucket of Blood | Yes | Yes | |
| 1959 | The Wasp Woman | Yes | No | |
| 1960 | Ski Troop Attack | Yes | Yes | |
| 1960 | House of Usher | Yes | Yes | |
| 1960 | Last Woman on Earth | Yes | Yes | |
| 1960 | The Little Shop of Horrors | Yes | Yes | Also writer |
| 1961 | Atlas | Yes | Yes | |
| 1961 | Creature from the Haunted Sea | Yes | Yes | |
| 1961 | The Pit and the Pendulum | Yes | Yes | |
| 1962 | The Premature Burial | Yes | Yes | |
| 1962 | The Intruder | Yes | Yes | |
| 1962 | Tales of Terror | Yes | Yes | |
| 1962 | Tower of London | Yes | No | |
| 1963 | The Young Racers | Yes | Yes | |
| 1963 | The Raven | Yes | Yes | |
| 1963 | The Terror | Yes | Yes | Also writer |
| 1963 | The Haunted Palace | Yes | Yes | |
| 1963 | X: The Man with the X-Ray Eyes | Yes | Yes | |
| 1964 | The Masque of the Red Death | Yes | Yes | |
| 1964 | The Secret Invasion | Yes | No | |
| 1964 | The Tomb of Ligeia | Yes | Yes | |
| 1966 | The Wild Angels | Yes | Yes | |
| 1967 | A Time for Killing | Uncredited | No | Replaced by Phil Karlson |
| 1967 | The St. Valentine's Day Massacre | Yes | Yes | |
| 1967 | The Trip | Yes | Yes | |
| 1968 | The Wild Racers | Uncredited | Uncredited | |
| 1969 | De Sade | Uncredited | No | Took over directing from Cy Endfield |
| 1969 | Target: Harry | Yes | No | Credited as "Henry Neill" |
| 1970 | Bloody Mama | Yes | Yes | |
| 1970 | Gas-s-s-s | Yes | Yes | |
| 1971 | Von Richthofen and Brown | Yes | Yes | |
| 1978 | Deathsport | Uncredited | Yes | |
| 1990 | Frankenstein Unbound | Yes | No | Also writer |

=== Producer only ===
| Year | Title | Director | Notes |
|---|---|---|---|
| 1954 | Monster from the Ocean Floor | Wyott Ordung | |
| 1954 | The Fast and the Furious | Edward Sampson; John Ireland | Also story writer, stunt driver and 2nd unit director |
| 1958 | Night of the Blood Beast | Bernard L. Kowalski | |
| 1963 | Dementia 13 | Francis Ford Coppola | |
| 1965 | Voyage to the Prehistoric Planet | Curtis Harrington | |
| 1966 | Blood Bath | Jack Hill; Stephanie Rothman | |
| 1967 | Devil's Angels | Daniel Haller | |
| 1968 | Targets | Peter Bogdanovich | |
| 1970 | The Dunwich Horror | Daniel Haller | |
| 1972 | Boxcar Bertha | Martin Scorsese | |
| 1973 | Sweet Kill | Curtis Hanson | |
| 1974 | Caged Heat | Jonathan Demme | |
| 1974 | Cockfighter | Monte Hellman | |
| 1974 | The Arena | Steve Carver; Joe D'Amato | |
| 1975 | Death Race 2000 | Paul Bartel | |
| 1976 | Fighting Mad | Jonathan Demme | |
| 1977 | Grand Theft Auto | Ron Howard | |
| 1977 | I Never Promised You a Rose Garden | Anthony Page | |
| 1978 | Piranha | Joe Dante | |
| 1979 | Rock 'n' Roll High School | Allan Arkush | |
| 1980 | Battle Beyond the Stars | Jimmy T. Murakami | |
| 1981 | Galaxy of Terror | Bruce D. Clark | |
| 1981 | Smokey Bites the Dust | Charles B. Griffith | |
| 1982 | Forbidden World | Allan Holzman | |
| 1983 | Space Raiders | Howard R. Cohen | |
| 1983 | Suburbia | Penelope Spheeris | Also presenter |
| 1986 | Amazons | Alejandro Sessa | |
| 1987 | Sweet Revenge | Mark Sobel | |
| 1987 | Slumber Party Massacre II | Deborah Brock | |
| 1987 | Munchies | Bettina Hirsch | |
| 1988 | Andy Colby's Incredible Adventure | Deborah Brock | |
| 1989 | Masque of the Red Death | Larry Brand | |
| 1989 | The Terror Within | Thierry Notz | |
| 1989 | Watchers II: The Outsider | Thierry Notz | |
| 1990 | Naked Obsession | Dan Golden | |
| 1990 | Slumber Party Massacre III | Sally Mattison | |
| 1991 | The Unborn | Rodman Flender | |
| 1991 | Field of Fire | Cirio H. Santiago | |
| 1992 | Killer Instinct | David Tausik | |
| 1992 | Munchie | Jim Wynorski | |
| 1993 | Carnosaur | Adam Simon | |
| 1993 | Dracula Rising | Fred Gallo | |
| 1993 | The Skateboard Kid | Larry Swerdlove | |
| 1994 | The Unborn 2 | Rick Jacobson | |
| 1994 | Angel of Destruction | Charles Philip Moore | |
| 1994 | Hellfire | Rick Jacobson | |
| 1994 | The Fantastic Four | Oley Sassone | Unreleased |
| 1995 | Carnosaur 2 | Louis Morneau | |
| 1996 | Carnosaur 3: Primal Species | Jonathan Winfrey | |
| 1997 | Eruption | Gwyneth Gibby | |
| 1999 | The Shepherd | Peter Hayman | |
| 2001 | Raptor | Jim Wynorski | |
| 2002 | Escape from Afghanistan | Timur Bekmambetov | |
| 2004 | Dinocroc | Kevin O'Neill | Also presenter |
| 2006 | The Hunt for Eagle One | Brian Clyde | |
| 2006 | The Hunt for Eagle One: Crash Point | Brian Clyde | |
| 2007 | Supergator | Kevin O'Neill | |
| 2012 | Attack of the 50 Foot Cheerleader | Kevin O'Neill | |
| 2014 | Roger Corman's Operation Rogue | Brian Clyde | |
| 2015 | Fist of the Dragon | Antony Szeto | |
| 2017 | Death Race 2050 | G.J. Echternkamp | |

=== Executive producer ===
| Year | Title | Director | Notes |
|---|---|---|---|
| 1955 | The Beast with a Million Eyes | David Kramarsky; Lou Place; Donald Myers | Uncredited; Also directed some scenes |
| 1958 | Hot Car Girl | Bernard L. Kowalski | |
| 1958 | The Cry Baby Killer | Joe Addis | |
| 1959 | Attack of the Giant Leeches | Bernard L. Kowalski | |
| 1960 | Battle of Blood Island | Joel Rapp | |
| 1976 | Eat My Dust! | Charles B. Griffith | |
| 1978 | Avalanche | Corey Allen | |
| 1982 | Sorceress | Jack Hill | Hill credited as Brian Stuart |
| 1983 | Deathstalker | James Sbardellati | Sbardellati credited as John Watson |
| 1985 | Barbarian Queen | Héctor Olivera | |
| 1987 | Deathstalker II | Jim Wynorski | |
| 1995 | Dillinger and Capone | Jon Purdy | |
| 2008 | Death Race | Paul W. S. Anderson | |
| 2011 | Death Race 2 | Roel Reiné | |
| 2013 | Death Race 3: Inferno | Roel Reiné | |
| 2018 | Death Race: Beyond Anarchy | Don Michael Paul | |

== TV movies ==
=== Producer ===
| Year | Title | Director |
|---|---|---|
| 1995 | Hellfire | David Tausik |
| 2006 | Saurian | John Carl Buechler |
| 2010 | Sharktopus | Declan O'Brien |
| 2015 | Sharktopus vs. Pteracuda | Kevin O'Neill |
| 2015 | Sharktopus vs. Whalewolf | Kevin O'Neill |

=== Executive producer ===
| Year | Title | Director | Notes |
|---|---|---|---|
| 1978 | Outside Chance | Michael Miller | |
| 1980 | The Georgia Peaches | Daniel Haller | |
| 1994 | Cheyenne Warrior | Mark Griffiths | |
| 1995 | Suspect Device | Rick Jacobson | Part of the Roger Corman Presents |
| 1995 | The Alien Within | Scott P. Levy | Part of the Roger Corman Presents |
| 1995 | Sawbones | Catherine Cyran | Part of the Roger Corman Presents |
| 1995 | Virtual Seduction | Paul Ziller | Part of the Roger Corman Presents |
| 1995 | Bram Stoker's Burial of the Rats | Dan Golden | Part of the Roger Corman Presents |
| 1995 | The Wasp Woman | Jim Wynorski | Part of the Roger Corman Presents |
| 1995 | A Bucket of Blood | Michael James McDonald | Part of the Roger Corman Presents |
| 1995 | Piranha | Scott P. Levy | Part of the Roger Corman Presents |
| 1995 | Terminal Virus | Dan Golden | Part of the Roger Corman Presents |
| 1996 | Subliminal Seduction | Andrew Stevens | Part of the Roger Corman Presents |
| 1996 | Inhumanoid | Victoria Muspratt | Part of the Roger Corman Presents |
| 1996 | Alien Avengers | Lev L. Spiro | Part of the Roger Corman Presents |
| 1996 | The Unspeakable | Howard McCain | |
| 1996 | Last Exit to Earth | Katt Shea | Part of the Roger Corman Presents |
| 1996 | Humanoids from the Deep | Jeff Yonis | Part of the Roger Corman Presents |
| 1997 | Alien Avengers II | Dave Payne | Part of the Roger Corman Presents |
| 1999 | Velocity | Harvey Berman | |
| 2001 | Avalanche Alley | Paul Ziller | |
| 2005 | Asphalt Wars | Henry Crum | |
| 2005 | Bloodfist 2050 | Cirio H. Santiago | |
| 2007 | Cry of the Winged Serpent | Jim Wynorski | |
| 2010 | Dinoshark | Kevin O'Neill | |
| 2010 | Dinocroc vs. Supergator | Jim Wynorski | |
| 2011 | Camel Spiders | Jim Wynorski | |
| 2012 | Piranhaconda | Jim Wynorski | |

== Acting roles ==
| Year | Title | Role | Notes |
|---|---|---|---|
| 1954 | Monster from the Ocean Floor | Tommy | Uncredited |
| 1954 | The Fast and the Furious | Roadblock State Trooper | Uncredited |
| 1957 | Naked Paradise | Office Worker | |
| 1958 | War of the Satellites | Ground Control | Uncredited |
| 1958 | Hot Car Girl | Cop Who Finds Note | Uncredited |
| 1958 | The Cry Baby Killer | Joe - TV Truck Man | Uncredited |
| 1959 | The Wasp Woman | Doctor in the Hospital | Uncredited |
| 1960 | Ski Troop Attack | German Soldier Entering Cabin | Uncredited |
| 1961 | Atlas | Greek soldier | Uncredited |
| 1974 | The Godfather Part II | Senator #2 | |
| 1976 | Cannonball! | District Attorney | |
| 1981 | The Howling | Man in Phone Booth | Uncredited |
| 1984 | Swing Shift | Mr. MacBride | |
| 1991 | The Silence of the Lambs | F.B.I. Director Hayden Burke | |
| 1993 | Body Bags | Dr. Bregman | Segment "Eye" |
| 1993 | Philadelphia | Mr. Roger Laird | |
| 1995 | Apollo 13 | Congressman | |
| 2000 | Scream 3 | Studio Executive | |
| 2003 | Looney Tunes: Back in Action | Hollywood Director | |

== Documentary appearances ==
- Some Nudity Required (1998)
- Popatopolis (2009)
- Nightmares in Red, White, and Blue (2009)
- Corman's World: Exploits of a Hollywood Rebel (2011)
- Still Screaming: The Ultimate Scary Movie Retrospective (2011)
- Roger Corman: The Pope of Pop Cinema (2020)

== Unmade and unreleased films ==
- High Steel - a "steeplejack story" (1955)
- Cobra - a film to be shot in India in Cinemascope (1955) with Gaby Bruyère
- Fortress Beneath the Sea - shot off Baja California (1955)
- The Kickback by John Robinson and Frank Burt
- an adaptation of She by H. Rider Haggard for American International Pictures (late 1950s) - never made, although Corman got to travel overseas, scouting locations
- Devil on Horseback - a Western based on the Brownsville Raid based on a script by Charles B. Griffith (1955)
- The Stake - a Western by George Leffert to star Dana Andrews
- Part Time Mother - from a script by Charles B. Griffith
- The Haunted Dream (circa 1961) - a biopic of Edgar Allan Poe
- I Flew a Spy Plane Over Russia (early 1960s) - based on the Francis Gary Powers incident with a script written by Robert Towne that Corman claims was not finished in time
- a biopic on Robert E. Lee for United Artists (early 1960s)
- an adaptation of Portrait of the Artist as a Young Man (mid-1960s) based on a script by Hugh Leonard for Columbia, which they did not want to make
- an adaptation of Kafka's The Penal Colony for Columbia, to be shot on the set for King Rat (1965)
- a script by novelist Richard Yates about the Battle of Iwo Jima (circa 1965)
- The Long Ride Home - a Western based on a script by Robert Towne (circa 1965)
- Couples - based on a novel by John Updike for United Artists (circa 1971)
- The Fantastic Four - a film produced by Corman, but never released (1993–94)

== Bibliography ==
- Corman, Roger and Jim Jerome, How I Made a Hundred Movies in Hollywood and Never lost a Dime. New York: Muller, 1990. ISBN 978-0-3945-6974-1.
