= Roger Corman's Operation Rogue =

- DVD cover
- Directed by: Brian Clyde
- Written by: Mike MacLean
- Produced by: Roger Corman; Christopher R. Santiago (Associate producer) Steven Louis Goldenberg (Associate producer)
- Starring: Mark Dacascos; Sofia Pernas; Treat Williams; Joe Suba; Christopher M. Elassad Lance Falcon
- Cinematography: Travis Tips
- Music by: John Carta
- Production company: New Horizons Picture Corporation
- Distributed by: Sony Pictures Home Entertainment
- Release date: September 5, 2014
- Running time: 88 minutes
- Languages: English; Filipino

Roger Corman's Operation Rogue (aka Operation Rogue) is a 2014 direct-to-video action film and, although not the sequel to Corman's The Hunt for Eagle One, and The Hunt for Eagle One: Crash Point, has many similarities to them. Following the same format of the earlier films, the story again takes place in the Philippines and involves international terrorism.

The film was produced by the legendary B-movie producer Roger Corman and stars Mark Dacascos, Sofia Pernas, Treat Williams, Joe Suba and Christopher M. Elassad. Like the earlier action films, there is the inclusion of a major star; Rutger Hauer appeared in The Hunt for Eagle One, while Jeff Fahey was in The Hunt for Eagle One: Crash Point.

== Plot ==
Sayid Nassif leads a group of terrorists in the Philippines. They carry out attacks and other illegal operations to obtain TNT and radioactive caesium-137. The terrorists have the ingredients for a "dirty bomb", which they plan to use to kill delegates at the first Asean Counter-Terrorism Council meeting, in Manila.

At Camp Navarro, a U.S. Marine military base in Mindanao, a rapid deployment force led by Captain Max Randall receives orders from General Hank Wallace to go after the terrorists. The general's daughter (and Randall's girlfriend), Jenna Wallace, works for the security contractor providing security at the Manila conference. Her security and technical skills place her on the Marine operation.

Nassif is collaborating with a local revolutionary, Abdul Malik, son of the 2004 U.S. Embassy bomber Omar Malik. The Marines attack a warehouse where the terrorist and revolutionary groups are meeting. While Sergeant McCray is able to blow up a truck with some of the leaders inside, some civilians are killed by friendly fire, with the act caught on a civilian's camera. Subsequently, Randall is ordered to stand down his unit.

Intent on seeking revenge for their dead in the warehouse attack, the terrorists attempt to abduct Randall, instead capturing Jenna, who is held for a $5 million ransom. General Wallace wants to pay the ransom, but Randall is given a new set of orders to go into the Philippines jungle to track down the terrorists and bring back Jenna. Jenna is freed, but Randall is captured. The Marines also learn that the terrorists are trying to establish a satellite feed to set off their dirty bomb. With the assistance of a U.S. Marine task force flying F/A-18 Hornet jet fighters, Jenna and the Marines storm the terrorist headquarters. Finally cornered, the terrorists are killed.

== Cast ==
- Mark Dacascos as Captain Max Randall
- Sofia Pernas as Jenna Wallace
- Treat Williams as General Hank Wallace
- Joe Suba as Lieutenant Barnes
- Chris Elassad as Sergeant McCray
- Dan Corbe as Sayid Nassif
- Nash Espinosa as Omar Malik
- Henry Strzalkowski as General Castillo
- Benson Jimenez as Abdul Malik
- Nicco Manalo as Eduardo
- Bon Vibar as Secretary Riviera
- Ronald Asinas as Patch
- Rey Comia as Aziz
- Kiel Rodriguez as PFC Galloz
- Ronald Carlton "Tonton" Papa Tan as PFC Reyes
- Ollie (Billy) Campbell as Military Newscaster

== Production ==
Roger Corman's Operation Rogue was produced by Hollywood producer Roger Corman and co-producer Philippine producer Cirio H. Santiago, a collaboration spanning over 20 productions. Cirio's son, Christopher R. Santiago, was the associate producer on the film.

In Roger Corman's Operation Rogue, the setting was again the Philippines, with Corman employing a number of local actors. The actors who played terrorists spoke in Tagalog or Filipino.
