= List of The Young and the Restless characters introduced in 2015 =

The Young and the Restless is an American television soap opera. It was first broadcast on March 26, 1973, and airs on CBS. The following is a list of characters that first appeared on the soap opera in 2015, by order of first appearance. All characters are introduced by executive producer Jill Farren Phelps and co-executive producer/head writer Charles Pratt, Jr.

== Marco Annicelli ==
Marco Annicelli
- The Young and the Restless character
- Portrayed by: Peter Bergman
- Duration: 2015
- First appearance: February 17, 2015
- Last appearance: November 27, 2015
- Created by: Charles Pratt, Jr. and Tracey Thomson
- Introduced by: Jill Farren Phelps and Charles Pratt, Jr.
In-universe information
- Other names: Jack Abbott
- Occupation: Crime Boss

Marco Annicelli was a primary antagonist in Victor Newman's plan to bring down his rival, Jack Abbott. He was portrayed by Peter Bergman, who portrayed Jack at the same time.

Marco's character was introduced in a plot in which Jack Abbott's character would be forcibly swapped out. He acted as a doppelgänger, and took over his life, while Real Jack was held captive in an unknown location. This was revealed in April 2015. On-Air On-Soaps noted that there was much speculation leading up to the reveal, observing that "Many in the audience guessed it". Bergman took on dual roles, the first time he had done this in his career. The actor said that he was "having a ball" playing two characters, saying: "The challenge is to make it entertaining and the best way to do that is to make a lot of it funny, and we do." Luke Kerr of Daytime Confidential wrote: "[Victor] went shopping at Moguls-R-Us and came home with a shiny, new Jack Abbott (Peter Bergman) doppelganger, whom he's unleashed on Genoa City." Little was known about Marco upon his introduction to the soap opera, apart from the fact that he was found by Victor in a Peruvian prison, although Bergman speculated that the character "is quite literally a doppelgänger, that lookalike we all supposedly have walking around on the planet somewhere". The character is described as a "loose cannon". Bergman also told TV Insider that Fake Jack "likes to wear bright stuff. I've been having a ball with the people in the wardrobe department!"

Can you imagine what it feels like to get out of jail and suddenly be Jack Abbott? Life with the beautiful Phyllis. The luxury. The expendable cash. It's a candy store! And he can't get enough of it fast enough. And unlike Jack, who is the ultimate in restraint when it comes to clothes, this guy likes things loud ... Fake Jack [Marco] has a very large appetite for life. He's very careless, but even when he makes a mistake, he's confident he can fix it.

— Bergman on Fake Jack, TV Insider

== Winston Mobley ==
Winston Mobley, played by Ryan Caltagirone, made his first appearance on March 24, 2015. He was introduced as the "ambitious" attorney hired by Christine Blair (Lauralee Bell) in her case Neil Winters (Kristoff St. John), who accidentally caused Christine to get run over. One of the soap's head writers, Charles Pratt Jr., said of the character, "Winning [the case], putting Neil away, will add another feather in [Winston's] cap. He is confident and focused, and as a result is Neil's worst enemy". It was hinted that Neil's ex-wife, Hilary Curtis (Mishael Morgan), would have sex with Winston in order to help protect Neil.

== Marisa Sierras ==
Marisa Sierras
- The Young and the Restless character
- Portrayed by: Sofia Pernas
- Duration: 2015–17
- First appearance: June 2, 2015
- Last appearance: February 24, 2017
- Created by: Charles Pratt, Jr. and Tracey Thomson
- Introduced by: Jill Farren Phelps and Charles Pratt, Jr.
In-universe information
- Occupation: Bartender; Assistant
- Husband: Luca Santori (divorced)
- Daughters: Ava

Marisa Sierras, played by Sofia Pernas, made her first appearance on June 2, 2015. She was introduced as the ex-girlfriend of Marco Annicelli (Peter Bergman) during the storyline where he took of the life of his doppelganger, Jack Abbott (Bergman).

In March 2016, Pernas was dropped to recurring status due to budgetary cuts. It was initially reported that the actress had been let go from the show, but a CBS spokesperson confirming that Pernas would continue to be seen as Marisa. Michael Fairman from Michael Fairman TV reported that fans were annoyed by the apparent news of her "sudden" departure.

== Emma Randall ==
Emma Randall
- The Young and the Restless character
- Portrayed by: Alice Greczyn
- Duration: 2015
- First appearance: September 9, 2015
- Last appearance: December 2, 2015
In-universe information
- Occupation: Nurse
- Sisters: Gwen Randall

Emma Randall, portrayed by Alice Greczyn, was introduced in September 2015 as the sister of Gwen Randall. Greczyn's casting was announced on August 7, 2015, through Soaps In Depth. The role would be recurring. Greczyn's role was diminished, when the soap faced budgetary cuts.

== Luca Santori ==
Luca Santori
- The Young and the Restless character
- Portrayed by: Miles Gaston Villanueva
- Duration: 2015–16
- First appearance: September 16, 2015
- Last appearance: September 9, 2016
- Created by: Charles Pratt, Jr.
- Introduced by: Jill Farren Phelps and Charles Pratt, Jr.
In-universe information
- Wife: Marisa Sierras (divorced)
- Daughters: Ava

Luca Santori, portrayed by Miles Gaston Villanueva, is introduced as the estranged husband of Marisa Sierras (Sofia Pernas). The series had released a casting call for role in July 2015. Villanueva's casting was announced on August 10, 2015. The actor had previously appeared on the series in a bit part of a priest assisting Nikki Newman (Melody Thomas Scott) with locating her long lost son, Dylan McAvoy (Steve Burton).

In 2015, Villanueva was cast in the newly created role of Luca Santori and is revealed to be the estranged husband of Marisa Sierras (Sofia Pernas), the girlfriend of Noah Newman (Robert Adamson). Luca would later grant Marisa a divorce so that she could pursue a serious romantic relationship with Noah. Luca was also briefly engaged to Nicholas Newman (Joshua Morrow) and Phyllis Abbott's (Gina Tognoni) daughter Summer Newman (Hunter King), before the engagement was called off when it was revealed by Victoria Newman's (Amelia Heinle) boyfriend, Travis Crawford (Michael Roark), at Luca and Summer's engagement party that Luca was responsible for the destruction of the oil rigs owned by Newman Enterprises and he was arrested for that crime and sent to prison.

== Christian Newman ==
Christian Newman
- The Young and the Restless character
- Portrayed by: Jamie and Alister Tobias (2015–19); Alex Wilson (2019–present)
- Duration: 2015–present
- First appearance: October 7, 2015
- Created by: Charles Pratt, Jr.
- Introduced by: Charles Pratt, Jr. and Jill Farren Phelps
In-universe information
- Other names: Christian Andrew Newman; Sullivan Collins McAvoy
- Family: Newman
- Father: Adam Newman; Nicholas Newman (legal)
- Mother: Sage Warner
- Half-brothers: Connor Newman; Noah Newman (legal)
- Half-sisters: Cassie Newman (adoptive)(legal); Summer Newman (legal); Faith Newman (legal)
- Grandparents: Victor Newman; Hope Wilson; Nikki Newman (legal)
- Aunts and uncles: Nicholas Newman; Victoria Newman; Abby Newman
- Nieces and nephews: Harrison Locke (adoptive)
- First cousins: Noah Newman; Reed Hellstrom; Johnny Abbott (legal); Eve Howard; Cassie Newman (adoptive); Summer Newman; Faith Newman; Katie Newman; Dominic Abbott Newman Winters Chancellor

Christian Newman is a fictional character from the original CBS Daytime soap opera, The Young and the Restless. He is the son of Sage Warner (Kelly Sullivan) and Adam Newman (Justin Hartley), prematurely delivered by Adam in Chancellor Park on October 7, 2015. Christian was presumed dead on November 8, 2015, as a result of complications from his premature birth. It was previously believed that Nicholas Newman (Joshua Morrow) is his father, however, it was revealed that Adam is Christian's biological father, and Adam doctored the results to avoid suspicion when he was masquerading as the late Gabriel Bingham. Only days later, it was revealed that Christian's death was faked by Dr. Anderson (Elizabeth Bogush), a doctor at Fairview. Dr. Anderson's motives for stealing the baby and faking his death are still unknown at this time, but on November 23, 2015, she handed Christian to Sharon Newman (Sharon Case) and congratulated her on the birth of her new son. Sharon was a patient at Fairview who was severely medicated by Dr. Anderson and kept in a drug-induced state. The doctor convinced Sharon that she was pregnant (she has miscarried) and kept her isolated at the hospital. Sharon and her husband, Dylan McAvoy (Steve Burton) decided to name "their" baby Sullivan "Sully" McAvoy, in honor of Dylan's friend who was killed in Afghanistan.

Sage confronted Nurse Stephens on April 27, 2016, and she admitted to stealing Christian and helping Dr. Anderson pass off Christian as Sharon's son. Sharon had a DNA test run which proved "Sully" was really Christian but decided to hide the truth. Sage confronted Sharon, who admitted the truth, but Sage died in a car wreck on her way to tell Nick that Christian was alive. The secret was exposed a few months later and Nick and Christian were reunited. In 2019, after Christian's biological father Adam returns, he was seeking to reunite with Christian, but was rebuffed by Nick and sued for custody of Christian.

== Simon Neville ==
Simon Neville
- The Young and the Restless character
- Portrayed by: Michael E. Knight
- Duration: 2015–16
- First appearance: October 15, 2015
- Last appearance: July 27, 2016
- Introduced by: Jill Farren Phelps

Simone Neville, portrayed by Daytime Emmy winning actor Michael E. Knight, was introduced as a doctor for hire working on behalf of Neil Winters (Kristoff St. John) in October 2015. Best known for his portrayal of Tad Martin on All My Children, Knight's casting was announced by TV Insider in September 2015. In June 2016, it was announced that Knight had finished taping for the role.

== Elise Moxley ==
Elise Moxley
- The Young and the Restless character
- Portrayed by: Jensen Buchanan
- Duration: 2015–16
- First appearance: November 13, 2015
- Last appearance: March 15, 2016
In-universe information
- Occupation: Judge
- Husband: Jay Moxley

Elise Moxley, portrayed by Jensen Buchanan, made her first appearance on November 13, 2015. Elisa was introduced as a "Genoa City socialite". Buchanan, who had appeared in several other soap operas, was enthusiastic about returning to acting after she was asked by The Young and the Restless about whether she would be interested taking on the role.
