= Crying Freeman (film) =

- International theatrical poster
- Directed by: Christophe Gans
- Screenplay by: Christophe Gans; Thierry Cazals
- Based on: Crying Freeman by Kazuo Koike; Ryoichi Ikegami
- Produced by: Samuel Hadida; Brian Yuzna
- Starring: Mark Dacascos; Julie Condra; Rae Dawn Chong; Byron Mann; Masaya Kato; Yoko Shimada; Mako; Tchéky Karyo
- Cinematography: Thomas Burstyn
- Edited by: Christopher Roth; David Wu
- Music by: Patrick O'Hearn
- Production companies: Toei Video Company; Fuji Television; Tohokushinsha Film Corporation; Davis Films; Ozla Pictures; Yuzna Films; Crying Freeman Productions
- Distributed by: Metropolitan Filmexport (France); Toei Company (Japan); August Entertainment (International)
- Release dates: 14 September 1995 (Toronto); 24 April 1996 (France); 23 November 1996 (Japan)
- Running time: 102 minutes
- Countries: France; Canada; Japan
- Languages: English; Japanese; Mandarin
- Budget: $9 million
- Box office: 627,579 tickets (France)

Crying Freeman is a 1995 action film, based on the manga of the same name by Kazuo Koike and Ryoichi Ikegami. It is directed and co-written by Christophe Gans in his solo directorial debut and stars Mark Dacascos in the title role, a brainwashed assassin for a Triad secret society, who sheds a tear for every victim he kills. Tchéky Karyo, Julie Condra, Byron Mann, Masaya Kato, Yoko Shimada, and Mako play supporting roles.

The film was an international co-production between France, Canada, and Japan, and was filmed on location in British Columbia in October 1994. Despite being heavily promoted by Viz Media in Animerica magazine and reprints of the Crying Freeman graphic novel, the film was not released in the United States until November 2018 on Amazon Prime Video.

== Plot ==
While painting the landscape on a hill in San Francisco, a young woman named Emu O'Hara witnesses the murder of a Japanese Yakuza member. She notices that while the assassin stands emotionless in front of her, his eyes begin to shed tears. The assassin introduces himself to Emu as "Yo".

Days later, after Emu returns to her home in Vancouver, British Columbia, Shido Shimazaki makes his appearance at the local police precinct, announcing a war between his clan, the Hakushin Society, and the "Sons of the Dragons" - a Chinese Triad that ordered the assassination of Shimazaki's son in San Francisco. Interpol detective Netah explains that the Sons of the Dragons are descendants of 108 Buddhist monks who rebelled against the Manchu reign in China centuries ago, and that the "Freeman" is their bringer of death. Shimazaki then tells everyone that Emu is the Freeman's next target, as she was the only witness to his son's assassination, and the assassin's code is that a person who is given Freeman's name becomes his next kill. However, shortly after their meeting is adjourned, Shimazaki and his bodyguards are ambushed outside the precinct by a masked Freeman and his assistant Koh. After dispatching the bodyguards and disabling the nearby police officers, Freeman successfully kills Shimazaki before running off. During his escape, he passes by Emu, who recognizes his eyes through his mask. As Freeman and Koh flee the scene, Emu utters Yo's name to the surprise of Detective Forge, who is assigned to protect her.

Later that night, Emu is interrogated by Netah and Forge over Freeman's identity. Due to a lack of evidence, she is shortly released and escorted back to her mansion. As Netah scouts the mansion's perimeters, he discovers that Forge is knocked unconscious and he encounters Ryuji and Kimie Hanada, who are out to claim the Freeman's head and take over the Hakushin Society. Inside the mansion, Emu discovers that Yo is in her room and begins to accept her fate. However, instead of killing her, Yo makes love to her before members of Ryuji and his gang break in. Yo kills the thugs and wounds Ryuji, but Emu is shot in the process. Against his own code, Yo brings Emu to the nearest hospital. After she recovers, Emu leaves the hospital, tailed by Netah and Forge; however, their car is rammed by a tractor-trailer driven by a Yakuza, and Forge is killed in the ensuing crash and explosion.

Emu travels to Japan and reunites with Yo, who tells her about his origins. Years ago, he was Yo Hinomura, a renowned pottery sculptor who stumbled upon a roll of negatives during his exhibit in New York City. Yo developed the photos in his hotel bathroom, revealing the torture and execution of a man wearing dragon tattoos similar to what he would eventually wear. Before leaving his hotel, he was drugged and abducted by the Sons of the Dragons, who implanted subliminal messages into his mind using acupuncture techniques. During his first mission, where he killed Mafia boss Antonio Rossi, he began to shed tears; hence his name Crying Freeman.

Yo is notified by Koh that Ryuji's gang have attacked a soya factory in Shanghai that was protected by the Sons of the Dragons. As retribution, Yo and Koh travel to Shimazaki's funeral outside Tokyo to kill Ryuji and wipe out the clan. During the funeral, while having sex inside a closet, Kimie reveals to Netah that the Shimazakis were set up by the Hanadas to be assassinated so they could take over the clan. Yo and Koh wipe out the clan, but as Koh prepares to kill Yo for treason, Ryuji guns him down before the entire complex blows up and kills him.

Yo returns to his home, where he prepares the area to self-destruct and arms himself to battle Netah and Kimie, along with her henchmen. Despite being wounded by Netah, Yo kills the henchmen and defeats Netah and Kimie - the latter by stabbing her near the heart. Kimie gives Yo her word of honor that in exchange for saving her life, he and Emu won't be pursued. While Yo and Emu leave the premises, Netah prepares to shoot them from behind, only to be killed by Kimie. Yo and Emu are last seen riding a speedboat into the sunset.

== Cast ==
- Mark Dacascos as Yo Hinomura, the "Crying Freeman", a skilled assassin who sheds tears for every target he kills.
- Julie Condra as Emu O'Hara, a woman who witnesses a murder committed by Freeman and eventually becomes his lover.
  - Condra's voice was dubbed over by Deborah Kara Unger.
- Tchéky Karyo as Detective Netah, an Interpol agent assigned to assist Vancouver police in protecting Emu from the Freeman.
  - Karyo's voice was dubbed over by Ron Perlman.
- Byron Mann as Koh, Freeman's handler.
- Masaya Kato as Ryuji "The Blade" Hanada, Shimazaki's right-hand man until Shimazaki's death makes him leader of the Hakushin Society.
- Yoko Shimada as Kimie Hanada, Ryuji's wife who has an extramarital affair with Netah.
- Rae Dawn Chong as Detective Forge, a Vancouver detective partnered with Netah.
- Mako as Shido Shimazaki, leader of the Hakushin Society until his death at the hands of the Freeman.
- Ivy Ng as Hu Feng-ling, leader of the Sons of the Dragon.
- Jerry Wasserman as Chief of Police Randall
- Alex Diakun as Antonio Rossi, a mobster and Freeman's first victim.
- Kevan Ohtsji as Takeshi Shimizaki, Shido Shimazaki's son.
- Paul McGillion as Detective McClinon

== Production ==
Following producer Brian Yuzna's work on The Guyver, the film's Japanese backers on the film were pleased with the results and asked Yuzna to approach some other anime based properties. Yuzna came across the manga Crying Freeman while negotiating with various Japanese companies for possible rights to manga that could be adapted to features. He thought the series would lend itself well to adaptation not only because of the storyline, but because the series had a very "cinematic" quality in its drawing style that would lend itself well to adaptation. The film draws primarily upon the "Portrait of a Killer" arc.

Jason Scott Lee was originally wanted for the lead role, but he had a three-picture obligation for Universal Pictures and could not commit to the project. Mark Dacascos lobbied for the part and eventually went on to become Christophe Gans' actor of choice for future and upcoming films.

Yuzna then contacted producer Samuel Hadida, with whom he had worked on Necronomicon and The Guyver, and as Hadida was already a fan of the manga, he helped to get the project in motion with a film version of Crying Freeman having been a long sought passion project for Hadida. The duo met with Taka Ichise, president of Ozla Pictures in Tokyo, who had also previously collaborated with the two on Necronomicon. Christophe Gans was hired as director on the basis of the strength of Gans' segment The Drowned from Necronomicon. Prior to working as a director, Gans had previously worked as a film critic in France. As the film was independently financed, the production experienced delays in receiving the budget with the promised budget of US$15 million reduced to US$9 million which truncated the shooting schedule. Principal photography took place in and around Vancouver, British Columbia from October through November of 1994 while the second unit was completed by the following month.

Roger Avary was an uncredited script doctor. Dacascos and his co-star Julie Condra met on the set of this film, and later married in 1998.

Thanks to presales in a number of distribution territories Crying Freeman managed to generate a profit before it was even released.

== Release ==
The film was exhibited at the 1995 Cannes Film Festival in May 1995 and Toronto International Film Festival the following September.

When the film was released in France, it became the highest grossing action film of the year managing to beat out major Hollywood releases such as Executive Decision and Sudden Death. Thanks to the film's success, director Christophe Gans managed to secure support for both a $45 million project centered on Captain Nemo and a live-action film version of Patlabor though neither project ultimately came to fruition.

Despite the film performing well internationally, Crying Freeman was never released in the United States.

In April 1997, Crying Freeman was screened at the Newport Beach Film Festival.

== Reception ==
Reviews for the film have been mixed. Les Inrockuptibles described the film as "An unfortunately overly referential attempt to resurrect a dying genre cinema in France." The magazine criticized the adaptation of the source material, describing the screenplay as weak and the characters as one-dimensional, but praised Gans for his "efficient, occasionally inspired" direction. Leonard Klady of Variety wrote a favorable review of the film, citing it as "one of the few of the recent batch of comic-book adaptations that works, Crying Freeman has the potential to ring up the type of big numbers that would warrant a franchise. It's hoped that those involved with the first will still be aboard." Jake Hamilton of Empire magazine gave the film two out of five stars, commenting: "Adapted from Kazuo Koike's ace comic book, Crying Freeman can claim absolute perfection with its faithfulness to the original text. The script is identical in all but speech bubbles, the acting is paper thin and the action very colourful. There's plenty of occult talk by leather-clad blokes to up the cult appeal, and the nudity should prevent the audience from nodding off, but this $15 million kung fu fantasy really should have been better."

Kung-Fu Cult Cinema gave the film a score of 3.5 out of 5, citing that it "is very well worth its weight in action." Beyond Hollywood, however, wrote in their review that the acting was sub-par and the film's subplot of Yo's relationship with Emu is "not the best story in the world. It's really rather, well, stupid."
