= Livin' for Love: The Natalie Cole Story =

- Based on: Angel on My Shoulder by Natalie Cole and Digby Diehl
- Screenplay by: Cindy Myers
- Directed by: Robert Townsend
- Starring: Natalie Cole; Diahann Carroll; James McDaniel; Randy J. Goodwin; Theresa Randle; Michael Anthony Rawlins; Ted Whittall; Richard Sali
- Composer: Stephen James Taylor
- Country of origin: United States
- Original language: English

Production
- Producer: Carroll Newman
- Cinematography: Denis Lenoir
- Editor: Sabrina Plisco
- Running time: 94 minutes
- Production companies: Pearson Television International; Robert Greenwald Productions

Original release
- Network: NBC
- Release: December 10, 2000

Livin' for Love: The Natalie Cole Story is a 2000 American drama film directed by Robert Townsend and written by Cindy Myers, based on the 2000 book Angel on My Shoulder by Natalie Cole and Digby Diehl. Starring Cole, Diahann Carroll, James McDaniel, Randy J. Goodwin, Theresa Randle, Michael Anthony Rawlins, Ted Whittall, and Richard Sali, the film premiered on NBC on December 10, 2000.

== Cast ==
- Natalie Cole as Herself
- Diahann Carroll as Maria Cole
- James McDaniel as Nat King Cole
- Randy J. Goodwin as Marvin Yancy
- Theresa Randle as Natalie Cole
- Michael Anthony Rawlins as Chuck Jackson
- Ted Whittall
- Richard Sali
- Clé Bennett as Abdullah
- Stephanie Sams as Natalie Cole
- Andrea Lewis as Natalie Cole
- Tyson Fennell as Robbie
- A.J. Saudin as Robbie
- Kaashif Ford as Robbie
- Alisha Morrison as Cookie Cole
- Catherine Burdon as Cookie Cole
- Sandi Ross as Aunt Bay
- Raven Dauda as Janice
- Quancetia Hamilton as Drue
- Megan Fahlenbock as Grace
- Judith Goodwin as Sarah
- Benz Antoine as Natalie's Bodyguard
- Jai Jai Jones as Michael
- Leah Miller Cheryl
- Sean Wayne Doyle as Jack
- Art Hindle as Ralph Goldman
- Larry Schwartz as Bob Krasnow
- Peter Wright as Bruce Lundvall
- Kevin Hare Jerry Griffith
- Peter Tufford Kennedy as David Foster
- Michael Kinney as Henry
- Bazil Williams as Preacher
- Barbara Mamabolo as Pam
- Angelo Celeste as Tommy LiPuma
- Kim Roberts as Preacher's Wife
- Laurie Bower as Johnny Mandel
