= Theresa Randle =

American actress

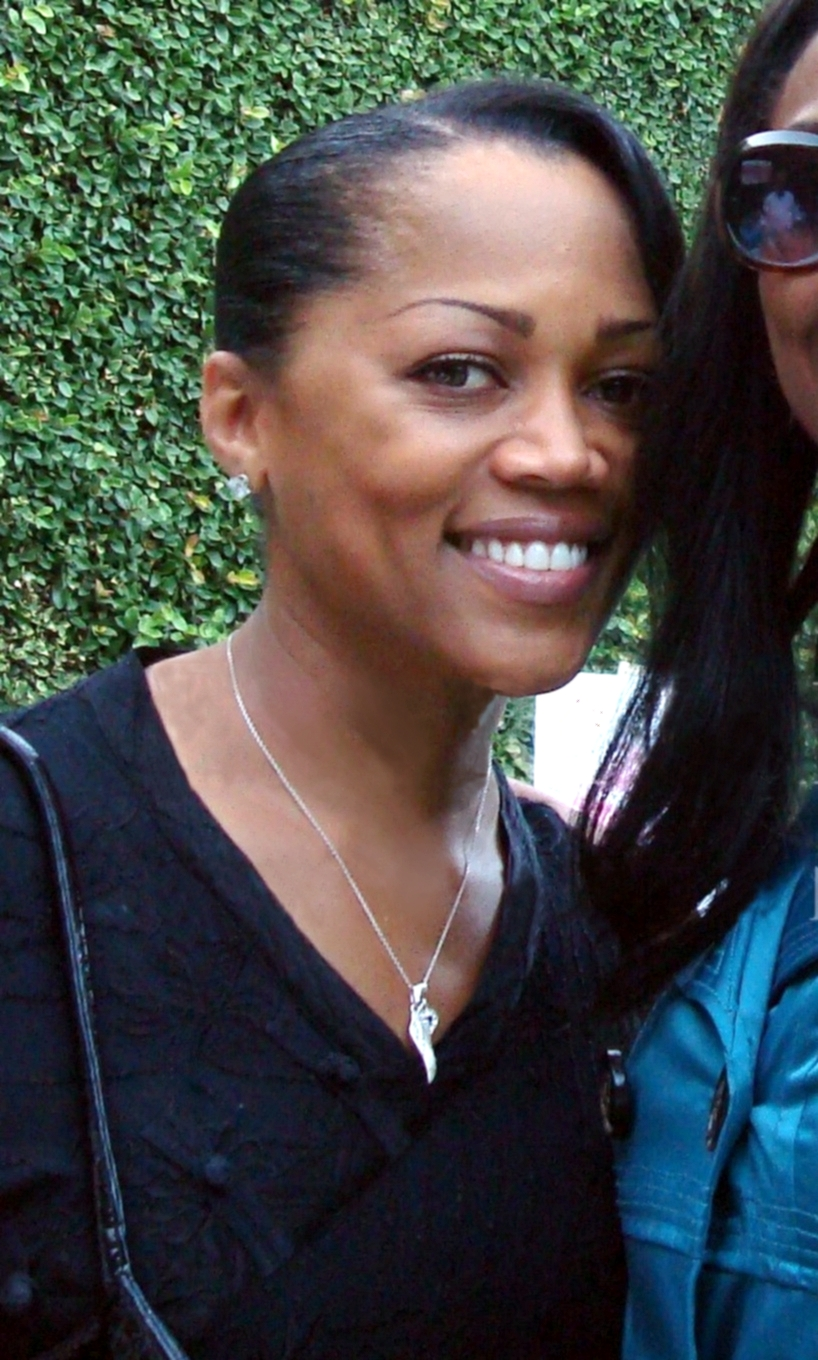
- Randle in 2007
- Born: December 27, 1964 (age 61)
- Occupation: Actress
- Years active: 1987–2010; 2020

Theresa Randle (born December 27, 1964) is an American retired actress. She has appeared in films such as Malcolm X (1992), Beverly Hills Cop III (1994), Space Jam (1996), Spawn (1997) and the Bad Boys franchise (1995–2020).

== Life and career ==
In 1983, Randle appeared in a George Clinton video, "Last Dance". In 1987, she got her first big-screen break with Maid to Order. For the next three years, she appeared in small roles in films such as Easy Wheels and Heart Condition (1990), with Denzel Washington. She continued in small roles by directors like Abel Ferrara King of New York (1990) and Spike Lee Jungle Fever (1991) and Malcolm X (1992). Randle also starred with Wesley Snipes in the film Sugar Hill (1994) and also appeared with Eddie Murphy in Beverly Hills Cop III in the same year. She co-starred in CB4 (1993) with Chris Rock, and Bad Boys (1995) with Will Smith and Martin Lawrence, later reprising in the sequels Bad Boys II and Bad Boys for Life.

In 1996, she earned her first starring role in Spike Lee's film Girl 6, playing a young out-of-work actress who gets caught up in the seductive yet dark world of phone sex, a subject that's far different from what Spike Lee normally explores in his films. It is often regarded as Lee's most maligned and underappreciated film both critically and commercially as it grossed a dismal $4.9 million on a $12 million budget, and is Randle's only leading role to date. Later that year she appeared in Space Jam (1996) with Michael Jordan and the film adaptation of the comic book Spawn in 1997.

After 1997, Randle's career cooled considerably and her roles (mostly television projects) became more sporadic. Her next project was not until the year 2000 when she portrayed singer Natalie Cole in Livin' for Love: The Natalie Cole Story. In 2006, Randle played Marine Capt. Amy Jennings in The Hunt for Eagle One and The Hunt for Eagle One: Crash Point. She later had a role in Shit Year, released in 2010. After 1997's Spawn, Randle's only theatrical releases were 2003's Bad Boys II and 2020's Bad Boys for Life, which was her first project (theatrical or televised) in ten years. In 2023, it was announced that her role in the Bad Boys franchise would be filled by actress Tasha Smith in the fourth film in the series.

During her time making movies, Randle also made guest appearances on various television sitcoms and dramas. In 1989, she had a guest starring role in A Different World, followed by a minor role in "The Apartment", an episode of the hit television sitcom Seinfeld two years later. In 2006, Randle signed on to play Patricia Kent on Law & Order: Criminal Intent, replacing Courtney B. Vance as the assistant district attorney assigned to the Major Case Squad, but only appeared in two episodes. In 2007, Randle was a regular cast member of the Lifetime show State of Mind as Dr. Cordelia Banks. In 2023, a video of her using a walker on Skid Row went viral, with people wondering if she was homeless. However, she was there to help the community, and using a walker because she had a broken femur.

== Filmography ==
=== Film ===
Year	Title	Role	Notes
1987	Maid to Order	Doni	
1987	Near Dark	Lady in Car	
1989	Easy Wheels	Ace	
1990	Heart Condition	Ciao Chow Club Maitre D'	
1990	The Guardian	Arlene Russell	
1990	King of New York	Raye	
1991	The Five Heartbeats	Brenda Williams	
1991	Jungle Fever	Inez	
1992	Malcolm X	Laura	
1993	CB4	Eve	
1994	Sugar Hill	Melissa	
1994	Beverly Hills Cop III	Janice Perkins	
1995	Bad Boys	Theresa Burnett	
1996	Girl 6	Girl 6	
1996	Space Jam	Juanita Jordan	
1997	Spawn	Wanda Blake	
2000	Livin' for Love: The Natalie Cole Story	Natalie Cole	TV movie
2003	Partners and Crime		TV movie
2003	Bad Boys II	Theresa Burnett	
2006	The Hunt for Eagle One	Capt. Amy Jennings	Video
2006	The Hunt for Eagle One: Crash Point	Capt. Amy Jennings	Video
2010	Ink	Nagi	Short
2010	Shit Year	Marion	
2020	Bad Boys for Life	Theresa Burnett	

=== Television ===
Year	Title	Role	Notes
1989	A Different World	Elizabeth James	Episode: "Delusions of Daddyhood"
1991	Seinfeld	Janice	Episode: "The Apartment"
1997	Duckman	Sassy	Voice, episode: "With Friends Like These"
1997	The Twisted Tales of Felix the Cat	Fairly Mother / Voices	Episode: "Comicalamities/Super Felix/Dueling Whiskers"
2006	Law & Order: Criminal Intent	A.D.A. Patricia Kent	2 episodes
2007	State of Mind	Cordelia Banks, PhD	Main cast, 8 episodes

== Awards and nominations ==
Year	Awards	Category	Recipient	Outcome
1998	Blockbuster Entertainment Awards	Blockbuster Entertainment Award for Favorite Supporting Actress - Horror	Spawn	Nominated
