= Sofia Pernas =

American actress (born 1989)

- Born: July 31, 1989 (age 37); Fez, Morocco
- Occupation: Actress
- Years active: 2009–present
- Spouse: Justin Hartley (m. 2021)

Sofia Pernas (born July 31, 1989) is an American actress who currently resides in Los Angeles. She starred in the NBC series The Brave and in the CBS action adventure series Blood & Treasure.

== Early life ==
Sofia Pernas was born July 31, 1989, in Fez, Morocco. Her parents immigrated to the United States when she was five years old and grew up in Orange County, California. Her mother is from Morocco, while her father is from Spain; both are multilingual. As a result, she speaks five languages: Arabic, English, Spanish, French and German. Although she initially planned a career in journalism, she was redirected to a career in modeling and acting after being scouted.

== Career ==
Pernas played Marisa Sierras on The Young and the Restless from 2015 to 2017, and appeared on the telenovela Jane the Virgin from 2016 to 2017. She starred as Hannah Rivera in the NBC series The Brave from 2017 to 2018, and played Lexi Vaziri on the CBS series Blood & Treasure from 2019 until its cancellation in 2022.

== Personal life ==
Pernas began dating her former The Young and the Restless co-star Justin Hartley in May 2020. They married in March 2021.

== Filmography ==
=== Film ===
Year	Title	Role	Notes
2011	Age of the Dragons	Rachel	
2014	Roger Corman's Operation Rogue	Jenna Wallace	
2014	Indigenous	Elena	
2018	Green Ghost and the Masters of the Stone	Karina	
2020	Secret Society of Second-Born Royals	Princess Anna	Disney+
2024	Sonic the Hedgehog 3	Gabriella	

=== Television ===
Year	Title	Role	Notes
2009	The Immortal Voyage of Captain Drake	Isabella Drake	Television film
2011	NCIS	Marine First Lieutenant Gabriela Flores	Episodes: "Engaged (Parts I & II)"
2011	Leverage	Sister Lupe	Episode: "The Boys Night Out Job"
2015–2017	The Young and the Restless	Marisa Sierras	Recurring role
2016	Transylvania	Coriander	Television film
2016–2017	Jane the Virgin	Catalina	Recurring role (season 3), 5 episodes
2017–2018	The Brave	Hannah Rivera	Main role
2018	He Knows Your Every Move	Ramona	TV film
2019–2022	Blood & Treasure	Lexi Vaziri	Season 1 & 2
2022	Quantum Leap	Tammy Jean Jessup / Carla	Episode: "A Decent Proposal"
2024–2025	Tracker	Billie Matalon	3 episodes: S1.E6: "Lexington", S2.E3: "Bloodlines", S2.E15: "The Grey Goose"
2025	Suits LA	Elizabeth Smith	Guest Star (Season 1)
