= Mark Dacascos =

American actor, martial artist, television personality (born 1964)

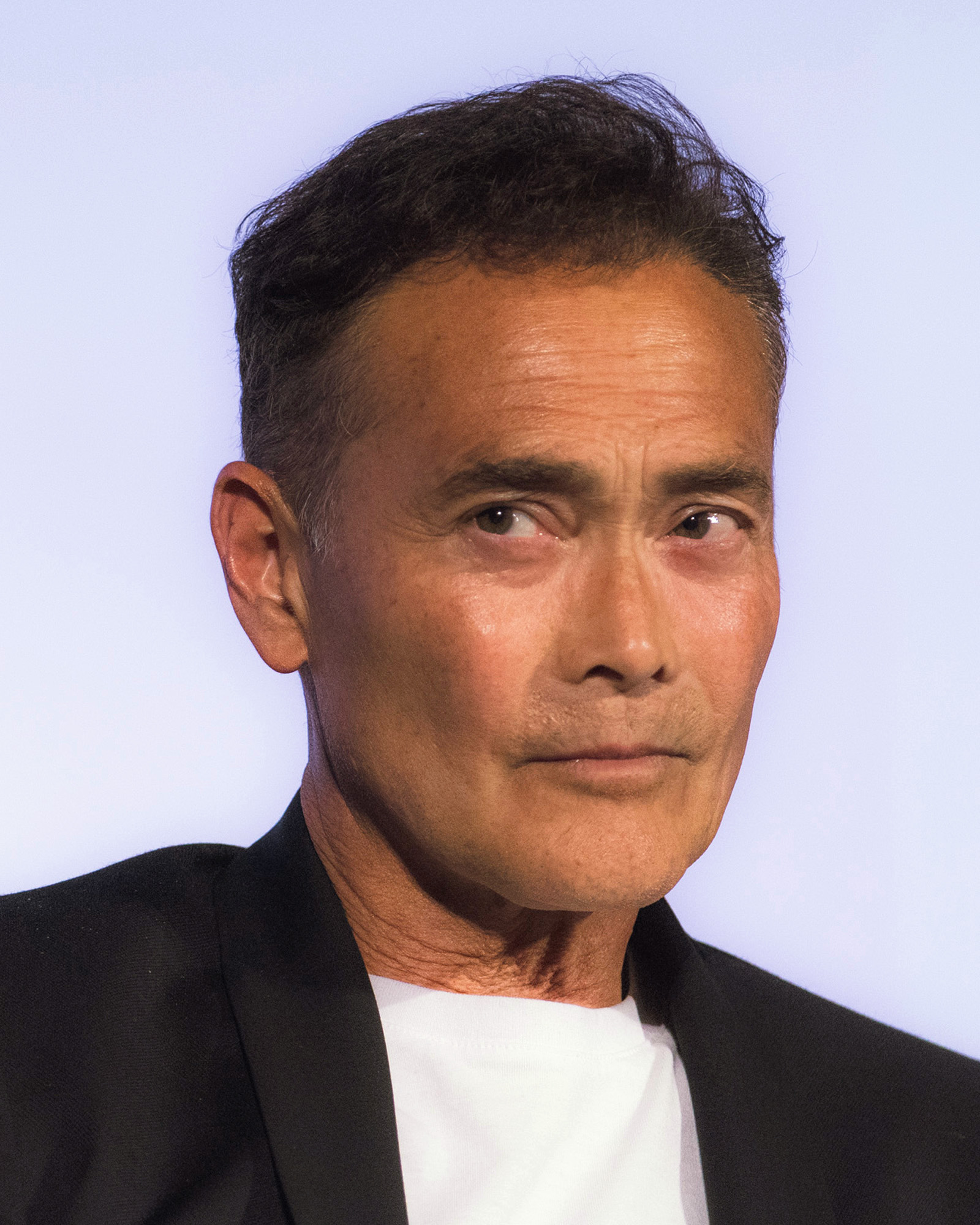
- Dacascos in 2025
- Born: Mark Alan Dacascos; February 26, 1964 (age 62); Honolulu, Hawaii, U.S.
- Other names: Marc Dacascos; The Chairman
- Education: Portland State University
- Occupations: Actor; martial artist; television personality
- Years active: 1985–present
- Spouse: Julie Condra (m. 1998)
- Children: 3
- Website: dacascos.com

Mark Alan Dacascos (born February 26, 1964) is an American actor, martial artist and television personality. A 4th-degree black belt in Wun Hop Kuen Do, he is known for his roles in action films, including as Louis Stevens in Only the Strong (1993), the title role in Crying Freeman (1995), Mani in Brotherhood of the Wolf (2001), for which he was nominated for the Saturn Award for Best Supporting Actor, the antagonist Ling in Cradle 2 the Grave (2003), Sharish in Nomad (2005), and as the assassin Zero in John Wick: Chapter 3 – Parabellum (2019).

On television, Dacascos is known for his portrayal of Wo Fat on Hawaii Five-0 (2010–2020), and for serving as "The Chairman" of Food Network's Iron Chef America series since January 2005, a role he reprised in 2022 on Netflix's Iron Chef: Quest for an Iron Legend. Dacascos' other roles include Kung Lao in the web series Mortal Kombat: Legacy, Eric Draven on The Crow: Stairway to Heaven and Eubulon on Kamen Rider: Dragon Knight. He also competed in the ninth season of Dancing with the Stars.

In 2023, he was inducted into the Martial Arts History Museum Hall of Fame.

== Early life ==
Dacascos was born on February 26, 1964, in Honolulu, Hawaii. His father, Al Dacascos, is of Filipino descent and was born in Hawaii; he is a martial arts instructor and the founder of Wun Hop Kuen Do. He was inducted into the Martial Arts History Museum Hall of Fame in 1999. His mother, Moriko McVey-Murray, is Irish of Japanese descent. In the History Channel presentation Samurai, Dacascos revealed that many members of his mother's family were killed in the bombing of Hiroshima. His stepmother is award-winning martial artist Malia Bernal. He attended Los Angeles Valley College, where he was on the gymnastics team. He also attended Portland State University in Portland, Oregon. He is proficient in his father's style of martial arts, Wun Hop Kuen Do, and holds a 4th degree black belt. He has also extensively studied Muay Thai, capoeira with Amen Santo, and Wushu. Growing up, Dacascos was inspired by Jackie Chan and Bruce Lee.

During his upbringing he lived a time in Hamburg, Germany, where he learned to speak German.

== Career ==
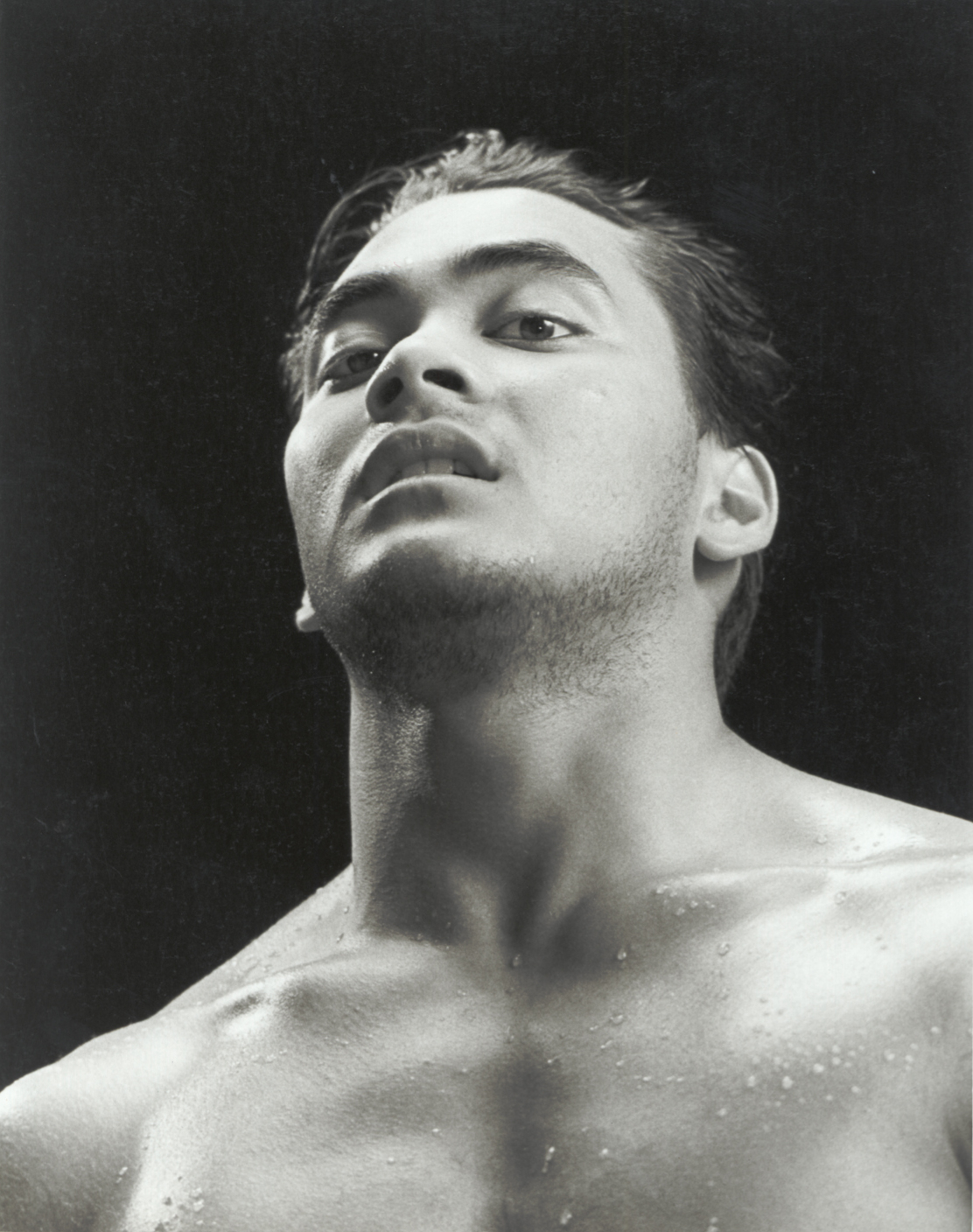
Dacascos in a production still taken during filming of a deleted scene in Wayne Wang's film Dim Sum: A Little Bit of Heart in 1983

Dacascos became an actor after being discovered walking down the street in San Francisco's Chinatown by Chris Lee (assistant director) and Rexall Chinn (hairstylist), who at the time were working for director Wayne Wang. He was cast in Dim Sum: A Little Bit of Heart, and though his scenes were cut from the final film, he went on to establish a film and television career primarily playing martial artists. He was originally set to play as the Red Ranger, Victor Lee, in Bio-Man, an adaptation of Choudenshi Bioman produced by Haim Saban. The show was not picked up at the time, but the concept evolved into Mighty Morphin Power Rangers.

His breakout role was in the 1993 film Only the Strong, in which he played Louis, a capoeira master who takes a high school's struggling students and turns their lives around by teaching them the Brazilian martial art based on the ritual combat technique of Angola. In the following year, Dacascos co-starred with Party of Five's Scott Wolf as Jimmy and Billy Lee, respectively, in the film Double Dragon, based on the video game with the same name.

Dacascos in 2011

He plays the role of the Chairman on Iron Chef America, Iron Chef Australia and Iron Chef: Mexico. In the series' backstory, Dacascos's character is the nephew of the original Iron Chef Chairman, Takeshi Kaga.

He has been featured in many action films such as Drive, Brotherhood of the Wolf, Crying Freeman and Cradle 2 the Grave, in which he squared off against Jet Li. He also performed in three video games: voice acting in Stranglehold, live acting in Wing Commander IV: The Price of Freedom and digitally recreating The Chairman in the Iron Chef America: Supreme Cuisine video game for Wii.

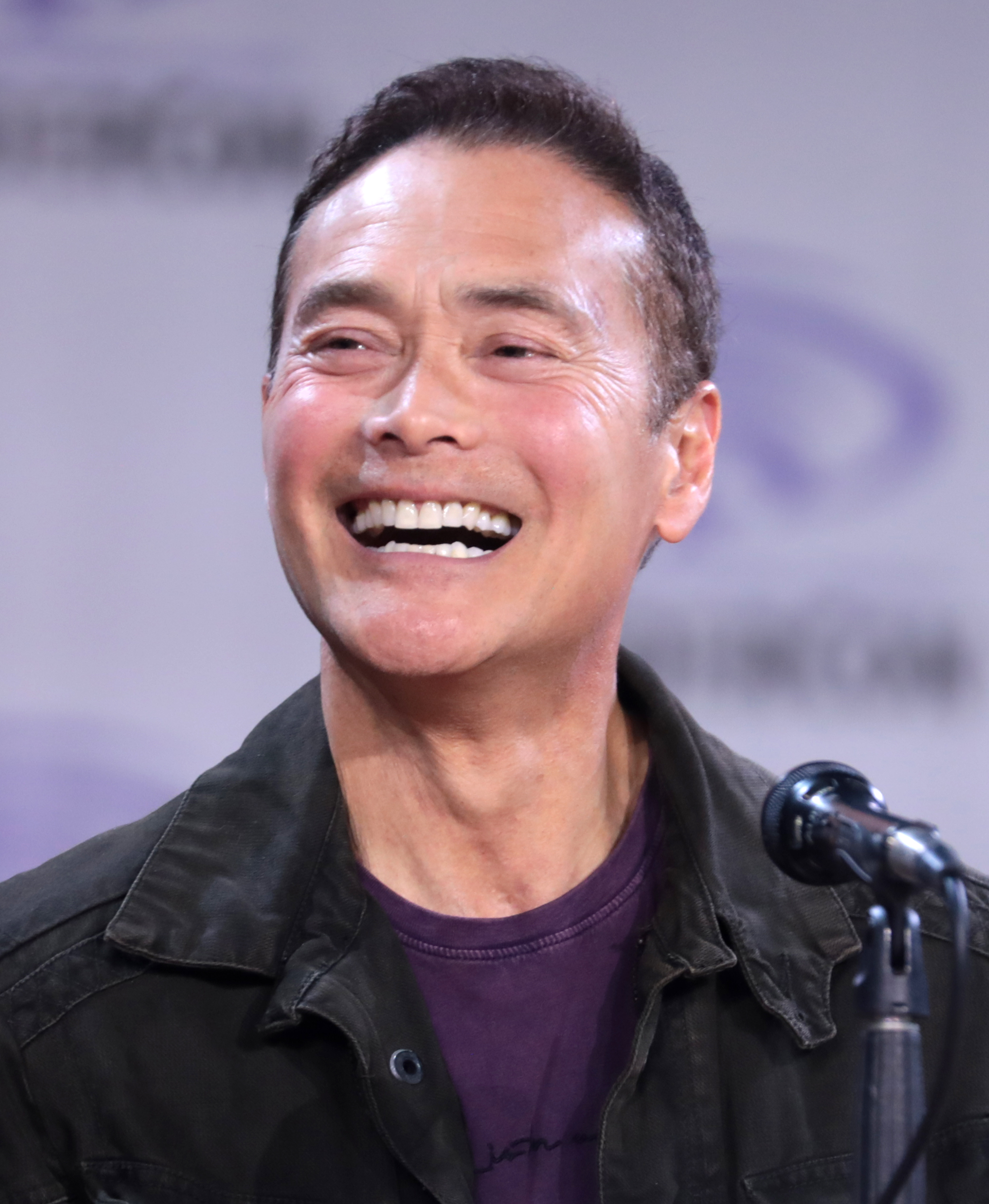
Dacascos in 2023

Dacascos was nominated for the Saturn Award for Best Supporting Actor in 2002 for his role in Brotherhood of the Wolf. He also appeared in the television series The Crow: Stairway to Heaven, which was a follow-up to the 1994 film The Crow. He also appears in the children's television show Kamen Rider: Dragon Knight, where he portrays Eubulon, also known as the Advent Master, mentor of the Kamen Riders and creator of the Advent Decks.

Dacascos played the recurring role of Wo Fat on the CBS series Hawaii Five-0. He portrayed Kung Lao in the second season of the YouTube series Mortal Kombat: Legacy. He had a recurring role in the third season of Agents of S.H.I.E.L.D. as Mr. Giyera, an Inhuman servant of Hydra who can manipulate inanimate objects.

In May 2019, Dacascos played Zero, a lead antagonist in the action thriller film John Wick: Chapter 3 – Parabellum. He starred in a recurring role on the Netflix series Wu Assassins. He has reprised his role as The Chairman of the Iron Chef series in Iron Chef: Quest for an Iron Legend, which was released on Netflix in June 2022.

== Personal life ==
Dacascos is married to actress Julie Condra, who starred with him in the 1995 action film Crying Freeman, and also the 2020 film One Night in Bangkok. They have three children: two sons, Makoalani and Kapono, and a daughter, Noelani.

== Filmography ==
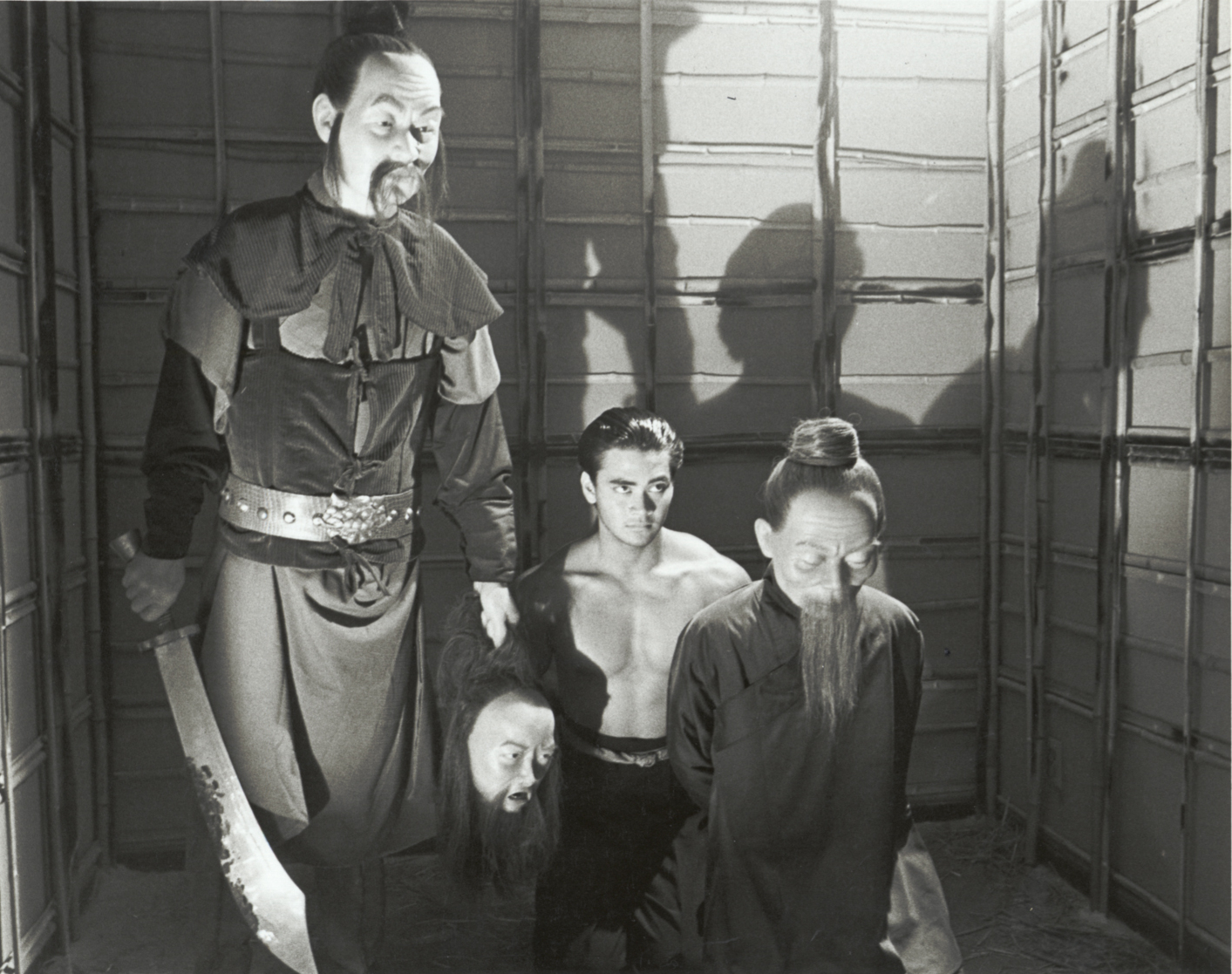
Dacascos (center) in a deleted scene from Dim Sum

=== Film ===
Year	Title	Role	Notes
1985	Dim Sum: A Little Bit of Heart	Fighter	Role deleted
1990	Angel Town	Stoner's Driver	
1992	American Samurai	Kenjiro Sanga	
1993	Only the Strong	Louis Stevens	
1993	Roosters	Filipino's Son	Cameo
1994	Double Dragon	Jimmy Lee	
1995	Deadly Past	Leo	
1995	Redemption: Kickboxer 5	Matt Reeves	Direct-to-video
1995	Crying Freeman	Yo Hinomura / Crying Freeman	
1996	The Island of Dr. Moreau	Lo-Mai	
1996	Sabotage	Michael Bishop	
1996	DNA	Dr. Ash Mattley	
1997	Drive	Toby Wong	
1997	Sanctuary	Luke Kovak	
1997	Deathline	Merrick	
1998	Boogie Boy	Jesse Page	
1998	No Code of Conduct	Paul DeLucca	
1999	The Base	Major John Murphy / Corporal John Dalton	
2000	China Strike Force	Tony Lau	
2001	Brotherhood of the Wolf	Mani	
2001	Instinct To Kill	J.T. Dillon	
2002	Scorcher	Colonel Ryan Beckett	
2003	Cradle 2 the Grave	Ling	
2005	Final Approach	Kato	
2005	Nomad	Sharish	
2006	Only the Brave	Steve "Zaki" Senzaki	
2006	The Hunt for Eagle One	Lieutenant Matt Daniels	
2006	The Hunt for Eagle One: Crash Point	Lieutenant Matt Daniels	
2007	Code Name: The Cleaner	Eric Hauck	
2007	Alien Agent	Rykker	
2007	I Am Omega	Renchard	
2008	Gideon Falls	Set	
2009	Serbian Scars	Peter Olsen Obilich	
2010	Shadows in Paradise	Lieutenant Max Forrester	
2010	Secret of the Sultan		
2013	The Lost Medallion: The Adventures of Billy Stone	"King Cobra"	
2014	Roger Corman's Operation Rogue	Captain Max Randall	
2014	The Extendables	Mark	
2016	Showdown in Manila	Matthew Wells	Also director and producer
2017	Maximum Impact	Tony Lin	
2017	Ultimate Justice	Gus	
2018	The Legend of Hallowaiian	Pono (voice)	
2019	John Wick: Chapter 3 – Parabellum	"Zero"	
2019	The Driver	The Driver	
2019	Lucky Day	Louis	
2020	One Night in Bangkok	Kai Kahale	
2021	Batman: Soul of the Dragon	Richard Dragon (voice)	
2022	The Ray	Brando	
2022	Blade of the 47 Ronin	Lord Shinshiro	
2023	Knights of the Zodiac	Mylock	
2024	Jade	Reese	
2026	Legend of the White Dragon	Xang	

=== Television ===
Year	Title	Role	Notes
1986	Bio-Man	Victor Lee / Biorhythm Red	Failed pilot
1986–97	General Hospital	Police Cadet	4 episodes
1990	Doogie Howser, MD	Julian	Episode: "The Grass Ain't Always Greener"
1990	The Flash	Osaku	Episode: "Child's Play"
1990	New Dragnet	Kevin Chow	Episode: "Queen of Hearts"
1991	Dead on the Money	Martial Arts Teacher	Television film
1994	Dragstrip Girl	Johnny Ramirez	Television film
1994	Tales from the Crypt	Felix Johnson	Episode: "The Pit"
1995	One West Waikiki	Moku	Episode: "Rest in Peace"
1998–99	The Crow: Stairway to Heaven	Eric Draven / The Crow	22 episodes
1999	Martial Law	Steven Garth	Episode: "Ninety Million Reasons to Die"
2002	CSI: Crime Scene Investigation	Ananda	Episode: "Felonious Monk"
2004–18	Iron Chef America	The Chairman	236 episodes
2006	Solar Attack	Lucas Foster	Television film
2007–08	Stargate Atlantis	Tyre	2 episodes
2007–12	The Next Iron Chef	The Chairman	16 episodes
2008	The Legend of Bruce Lee	Thai Boxer King Charles	3 episodes
2008	The Middleman	Sensei Ping	Episode: "The Sino-Mexican Revelation"
2009	Kamen Rider: Dragon Knight	Eubulon / Advent Master	9 episodes
2009	Dancing with the Stars	Himself	7 episodes
2009	Wolvesbayne	Von Griem	Television film
2010–20	Hawaii Five-0	Wo Fat	17 episodes
2014	Chicago P.D.	Jimmy Shi	Episode: "Different Mistakes"
2015–16	Agents of S.H.I.E.L.D.	Giyera	11 episodes
2016	Lucifer	Kimo Vanzandt	Episode: "Weaponizer"
2017	The Perfect Bride	Daniel Counter	Television film
2019	Wu Assassins	Monk/ Kun Zi	Recurring role
2022	Iron Chef: Quest for an Iron Legend	The Chairman	5 episodes
2023	Warrior	Kong Pak	Main Role (Season 3)
2023	SpongeBob SquarePants	Guru Greasetrap	Episode: "Spatula of the Heavens"
2023	Blue Eye Samurai	Bloodsoaked Chiaki (voice)	Recurring cast

=== Video games ===
Year	Title	Role
1996	Wing Commander IV: The Price of Freedom	Troy 'Catscratch' Carter

=== Web series ===
Year	Title	Role	Notes
2013	Mortal Kombat: Legacy	Kung Lao	4 episodes

== Awards and nominations ==
Institution	Year	Category	Work	Result
Asian World Film Festival	2024	Bruce Lee Award	—N/a	Won
Saturn Awards	2002	Best Supporting Actor	Brotherhood of the Wolf	Nominated
