= The Hunt for Eagle One: Crash Point =

- DVD cover
- Directed by: Henry Crum
- Written by: Michael Henry Carter
- Produced by: Roger Corman; Tom Krentzin; Cirio H. Santiago; Amy Searles
- Starring: Mark Dacascos; Theresa Randle; Jeff Fahey; Joe Suba; Zach McGowan
- Cinematography: Andrea V. Rossotto
- Edited by: Matt Clements; Vikram Kale
- Music by: Mel Lewis
- Production company: New Horizons Picture Corporation
- Distributed by: Sony Pictures
- Release date: June 27, 2006
- Running time: 86 minutes
- Country: United States
- Languages: English; Filipino

The Hunt for Eagle One: Crash Point is a 2006 American direct-to-video war film directed by Brian Clyde and produced by Roger Corman, starring Mark Dacascos, Theresa Randle, Jeff Fahey, Joe Suba, and Zach McGowan; Rutger Hauer did not return. The sequel to The Hunt for Eagle One, the story again takes place during Operation Enduring Freedom in the Philippines. It is the second installment in The Hunt for Eagle One film series.

== Plot ==
A group of al-Qaeda-backed local rebels disguised as lab technicians, led by Rasheed (Dick Israel), stage a raid on the Sultan Kudarat Airbase, home of the Joint U.S. Tactical Command in the Philippines. They manage to seize control of a "ground control encoder", an American device that locks out the controls and instruments in an aircraft, allowing it to be remotely controlled from the ground. The encoder was designed to prevent aircraft hijackings in the aftermath of the September 11 attacks, but the rebels intend to use it to cause another aircraft suicide attack.

With three airborne airliners as possible targets, the terrorists send out a warning that they will not hesitate to crash them and kill those on board in their attacks on government facilities. Despite efforts to stop them, the terrorists crash the first airliner into the airbase, destroying most of the aircraft and helicopters in the base and killing the occupants.

Barely escaping the attack on the airbase, pilot Captain Amy Jennings (Theresa Randle) appeals to her commanding officer, Colonel Halloran (Jeff Fahey), to airlift the U.S. Marines Strike Force Team, led by Captain Matt Daniels (Mark Dacascos), to defeat the rebels. The team is flown into the Philippines jungle to track down the rebels outside the airport perimeter. Once within striking distance, Jennings disobeys orders and rappels down to join Daniels and his team. The rebels are defeated, but they are revealed to be a decoy; in retaliation, the rebels crash the second airliner, and plan to use the last one against a nearby city.

Captain Daniels is ordered to return with his team, where they learn the rebels are using a broadcast company building as their headquarters. Captain Jennings airlifts Daniels and his team, but they are intercepted by armed rebels; only Daniels and Jennings, and Simmons (who remains behind and shoots a rebel soldier, possibly one of the wounded to be evacuated later radioed in by Daniels) survive.

Daniels takes out Rasheed's right-hand man and Jennings pursues Rasheed, who flees on a motorcycle. Jennings and Daniels pursue him in a helicopter, manage to catch up to and kill Rasheed, and take the encoder.

== Cast ==
- Mark Dacascos as Captain Matt Daniels
- Theresa Randle as Captain Amy Jennings
- Jeff Fahey as Colonel Halloran
- Joe Suba as Captain Seth Cooper
- Zach McGowan as Specialist Hank Jackson
- Steve Cryin as Simmons
- Jose Mari Avellana as General Santiago
- Dick Israel as Rasheed
- Boy Roque as Farhat
- George Canlas as Sgt. Bangayan
- Renee Rogoff as Field Reporter
- Robert Escutin as Hassin
- Dindo Arroyo as Ismail
- Noel Trinidad as Robert Gomez
- Jerry Corpuzas S Sentry (credited as Jerry Corpus)

== Production ==
The Hunt for Eagle One: Crash Point was produced by Hollywood producer Roger Corman and Philippine producer Cirio H. Santiago as his co-producer. The pair had worked together on over 20 productions, including When Eagles Strike (2003). Legendary for producing films on a shoestring budget and launching the careers of many famous filmmakers and stars, Corman was able to use much of the cast and crew of the earlier The Hunt for Eagle One film.

Much of the principal photography took place in the Philippines with Corman employing a number of local actors. The actors who played terrorists spoke Tagalog or Filipino, with key scenes having English subtitles.

== Reception ==
=== Critical response ===
While not reviewed by critics in mainstream media, The Hunt for Eagle One: Crash Point did garner some interest from internet bloggers and critics. Andy Webb in The Movie Scene said, "'The Hunt for Eagle One: Crash Point' is on par with the original but that is not praise as both movies whilst okay in places are lacking and fail to generate the excitement needed to keep hold of your attention.."

Robert Cetti, in Terrorism in American Cinema: An Analytical Filmography, 1960-2008, described The Hunt for Eagle One: Crash Point as "less a terrorist thriller than a minor war movie in which the enemies happen to be terrorists." He compared it to United 93 in dealing with issues surrounding the September 11 attacks.
