= Supergator =

- DVD cover
- Directed by: Brian Clyde
- Written by: Wayne Gates; Brian Clyde
- Produced by: Roger Corman
- Starring: Brad Johnson; Kelly McGillis
- Cinematography: Robert Shoemaker; Andrea V. Rossotto
- Music by: Damon Ebner
- Production company: New Horizons Picture Corp.
- Distributed by: Rodeo Productions
- Release date: July 14, 2007
- Running time: 92 minutes
- Country: United States
- Language: English

Supergator is a 2007 horror film directed by Brian Clyde, produced by Roger Corman, and starring Brad Johnson and Kelly McGillis. It is the second installment in the Dinocroc film series

== Background ==
After Corman produced Dinocroc in 2004, he wanted to create a sequel to be named Dinocroc 2, but the Sci-Fi Channel turned down the project after claiming that sequels did not do well for them. Corman decided to go ahead with the project, but under the name Supergator.

== Plot ==
Professor Scott Kinney is an American geologist monitoring a local volcano when a Supergator, a Deinosuchus recreated from fossilized preserved DNA, escapes from a secret bio-engineering research center/laboratory. Along the way, it eats 13 people, including two lovers, three drunken teens, three models, two tourists and a fisherman. It also eats Alexandra Stevens and Ryan Houston.

Kinney joins forces with another scientist, Kim Taft, and a Texan alligator hunter named Jake. They pursue the monster as it heads down river intent on destroying a luxurious resort packed with hundreds of tourists. Conventional weapons have no effect on it at all and Kim is eaten. So they, with the help of Carla, plan a trap for it using a fake volcano. They lure him on to it, with Jake using himself as live bait. The Supergator devours him and Kinney kills it by shooting at the fake volcano, which then blows up the beast.

== Cast ==
- Brad Johnson as Professor Scott Kinney
- Kelly McGillis as Kim Taft
- Bianca Lawson as Carla Masters
- Mary Alexandra Stiefvater as Alexandra Stevens
- Josh Kelly as Ryan Houston
- John Colton as Jake Kilpatrick
- Holly Weber as Lorissa
- Tamara Witmer as Gigi
- Nic Nac as Jeremy
- Meg Cionni as Wendy
- Greg Cipes as Shaun
- Matt Clendenin as The Driver
- Gene DeFrancis as Lance
- Sarah DuBois as Betty
- Elizabeth J. Carlisle as Brenda
- Sol Kahn as Jason
- Ikaika Kahoano as Rob
- Justin Loeb as Guy Running From Supergator
- Dave Ruskjer as Max
- Joanna Shewfelt as Tracy
- Charles Solomon as Joe
- Charles Solomon Jr. as Joe
- Jennifer Titus as Zoe
- Traci Toguchi as Melinda
