= The Hunt for Eagle One =

- DVD cover
- Directed by: Brian Clyde
- Written by: Michael Henry Carter
- Based on: The Hunt for Eagle One by Brian Clyde
- Produced by: Roger Corman; Cirio H. Santiago; Amy Searles
- Starring: Mark Dacascos; Theresa Randle; Rutger Hauer; Joe Suba; Zach McGowan
- Narrated by: Theresa Randle
- Cinematography: Andrea V. Rossotto
- Edited by: Matt Clements; Brian Clyde; Vikram Kale; Joshua Rosenfield
- Music by: Mel Lewis
- Production company: New Horizons Picture Corporation
- Distributed by: Sony Pictures
- Release date: January 17, 2006
- Running time: 88 minutes
- Languages: English; Filipino; Spanish

The Hunt for Eagle One is a 2006 direct-to-video war film directed by Brian Clyde and produced by Roger Corman, starring Mark Dacascos, Theresa Randle, Ricardo Cepeda, Rutger Hauer, Joe Suba, and Zach McGowan. Set during Operation Enduring Freedom in the Philippines, the film follows a team of U.S. Marines who attempt to rescue a captured U.S. Marine Corps captain and an Armed Forces of the Philippines major, while tracking down a group of al-Qaeda terrorists intent on launching biological weapons.

The sequel, The Hunt for Eagle One: Crash Point, featuring many of the same production crew and cast, came out on DVD some months later. It is the first installment in The Hunt for Eagle One film series.

== Plot ==
After a successful amphibious insertion, a small group of U.S. Marines prepare for combat against local rebels on the island of Mindanao in the southern Philippines. The U.S. Marine Corps force on the island is commanded by Gen. Frank Lewis (Rutger Hauer). While making a routine fly-by, a UH-1 Huey helicopter carrying Philippine troops and Marines, including USMC Captain Amy Jennings (Theresa Randle) and Philippine Major Aguinaldo (Ricardo Cepeda), is shot down by the rebels. Jennings and Aguinaldo escape the wreckage, and try to flee from the pursuing rebels.

A rescue team is dispatched to save Jennings and Aguinaldo, but is shot down by anti-aircraft fire. The survivors, led by Lt. Daniels (Mark Dacascos), continue onward to search for Jennings and Aguinaldo.

Jennings and Aguinaldo are captured by the rebels and taken to a village. There, Jennings tries to escape, but is caught. The following morning, Aguinaldo is executed by the rebel leader. They take Jennings to their headquarters.

The rescue team approaches the village and, learning that the rebels have moved Jennings to their headquarters, begin following the rebels. The rebels try to force Jennings to tell the U.S. government (through a video camera) that the U.S. Marines must leave the island, but she refuses, and is tortured in retaliation.

After battling several rebels, the rescue team link up with Philippine troops, and battle the remaining rebels in the headquarters. They rescue Jennings, destroy an anthrax lab, and escape from the blast. The rebel leader survives the blast, but Jennings shoots him dead. The film ends with Lt. Daniels and a Filipino soldier attached to him mourning the loss of their soldiers.

== Cast ==
- Mark Dacascos as Lieutenant Matt Daniels USMC, team leader of US Marines assigned to rescue Captain Jennings
- Theresa Randle as Captain Amy Jennings USMC, pilot of a UH-1 Huey whose helicopter crashed and was kidnapped by terrorists
- Rutger Hauer as Brig. General Frank Lewis USMC, Commander of US Marines in Philippines
- Joe Suba as Captain Seth Cooper USMC, platoon leader of Lieutenant Matt Daniels
- Zach McGowan as Specialist Hank Jackson, a grenadier armed with M203
- Joe Fozzy as Spec. Jeff Parker
- Rey Malonzo as Lt. Narcisco Montalvo, team leader of an infantry unit Philippine Army who is attached to Lieutenant Matt Daniels
- Ricardo Cepeda as Maj. Aguinaldo, Philippine Army officer injured later executed by Abubakar
- Jose Mari Avellana as Brig. Gen. Romero Panlilio Philippine Navy (Marines)
- Ronald Asinas as Sgt. Tonito Bangayan, assistant for Lieutenant Narcisco
- Monsour Del Rosario as Lt. Herman Reyes
- Robert Escutin as Cpl. J.P. Daomilas
- Jerry Corpuz as Pvt. Amador Magtuto (as Jerry Corpus)
- Troy de Guzman as Pvt. Marvello Abaya
- Reiven Bulado as vt. Don Tubayan (as Raiven Bulado)
- Joel Giray as Pvt. Benito Duran
- Jorge Canias as Khalil
- Jun Colao as Abdul
- Jojo De Leon as Abubakar

== Production ==
Hollywood producer Roger Corman has some experience in producing films on small budgets, and launching the careers of many later well-known filmmakers and actors. Corman managed to turn a profit on every single one of his films, using the small budgets to the effect and exploiting marketing techniques. For The Hunt for Eagle One. Corman teamed with Philippine producer Cirio H. Santiago as his co-producer. The pair had worked together on over 20 productions, including When Eagles Strike (2003), a similar war action movie filmed in the Philippines.

Much of the principal photography took place in the Philippines with Corman employing a number of local actors. The actors who played terrorists spoke in the Tagalog language or Filipino with key scenes having English subtitles.

== Reception ==
=== Critical response ===
While not reviewed by critics in mainstream media, The Hunt for Eagle One garnered some interest from internet bloggers and critics.

Nix from BeyondHollywood.com said, "For an action film on a budget, 'The Hunt for Eagle One' is more than decent entertainment. A bigger budget and longer shooting schedule, not to mention about 30 extra minutes added to the running time, would have fleshed out the characters and the political situation in the Philippines. To be sure, the script for Eagle One doesn’t show much interest in being substantive on a geopolitical level, not that anyone should notice, as that particular niche is currently filled up by Hollywood ala Syriana and others. Which leaves you to wonder what Brian Clyde and company could have done with Syriana's budget ... Hopefully, we’ll get to find out one day."

Robert Cetti, in Terrorism in American Cinema: An Analytical Filmography, 1960-2008, described The Hunt for Eagle One as mainly a war film with "parallels to the mainstream hit 'Black Hawk Down'." As an allusion to geopolitics, the film was "one of the few films to deal with Al-Qaeda directly."

== Sequel ==
A sequel titled The Hunt for Eagle One: Crash Point was released in 2006.
