= Brian Clyde =

American film director

- Born: August 19, 1977 (age 48); New York City, US
- Occupations: Director, writer, producer
- Years active: 2000–present
- Website: http://www.brianclyde.com

Brian Clyde (born August 19, 1977) is an American film director, screenwriter, and producer.

== Biography ==
Brian Clyde was born and raised in Manhattan. He graduated from New York University's Tisch School of the Arts in 1999 with a BFA in Film Production. His senior thesis, Criminal Obsession, won Best Short Narrative at the Seattle Underground Film Festival in 2000. This caught the eye of filmmaker Roger Corman, who decided to finance Clyde's first feature, Rage and Discipline, which Clyde wrote and directed. Rage and Discipline received a favorable review from Ronnie Scheib of Variety and an Honorable Mention at the African Diaspora Film Festival.

Clyde went on to direct two more feature films for Roger Corman and then completed Growing, a feature-length documentary about small, sustainable farms in the Hudson Valley region of New York State.

== Filmography ==
Year	Title	Role
2000	Criminal Obsession	Writer/Director
2004	Rage & Discipline	Writer/Director
2006	The Hunt for Eagle One	Director
2007	Supergator	Writer/Director
2012	Growing	Writer/Director
2014	Operation Rogue	Writer/Director
2024	SHADOWS : The Movie	Writer/Director

== Awards ==
Year	Film	Award	Awarding Entity
2000	Criminal Obsession	Best Short Narrative	Seattle Underground Film Festival
2004	Rage & Discipline	Honorable Mention	African Diaspora Film Festival
